= 35th AVN Awards =

US adult industry award ceremony in 2018

- Date: January 27, 2018
- Site: The Joint; Hard Rock Hotel and Casino, Paradise, Nevada, USA
- Hosted by: Harli Lotts; Angela White

Highlights
- Best Picture: Half His Age: A Teenage Tragedy
- Most awards: Justice League XXX: An Axel Braun Parody (6); Angela 3 (6)
- Most nominations: Justice League XXX: An Axel Braun Parody (13)

Television coverage
- Network: Showtime

The 35th AVN Awards, presented by Adult Video News (AVN), honored the best pornographic movies and adult entertainment products of between October 1, 2016, and September 30, 2017, and took place on January 27, 2018 at The Joint in Hard Rock Hotel and Casino, Paradise, Nevada. During the ceremony, Adult Video News presented AVN Awards (often referred to as the Oscars of porn) in more than 100 categories. Webcam star Harli Lotts and performer/director Angela White co-hosted the ceremony, each for the first time. Master of ceremonies was comedian Aries Spears.

The show was webcast live on AVN.com originating from Livestream.com. This year also marked the return of GayVN Awards after extended hiatus held at same location a week before AVN awards; both being part of AVN Adult Entertainment Expo also known as AVN Week.

Best Drama winner Half His Age: A Teenage Tragedy earned honors as Best Movie. However, Justice League XXX: An Axel Braun Parody and Angela 3 each won six awards, tied for the most honors at the show. Movie of the Year winner Half His Age: A Teenage Tragedy took four trophies.

== Winners and nominees ==
The nominees for the 35th AVN Awards were announced on November 16, 2017, at the annual AVN Awards Nominations Party at The Edison lounge in downtown Los Angeles.|

The winners were announced during the awards ceremony on January 27, 2018.

The major performer awards went to Angela White, AVN Female Performer of the Year Award; Markus Dupree, Male Performer of the Year and Jill Kassidy, Best New Starlet. In terms of movies, the big winners were Justice League XXX: An Axel Braun Parody and Angela 3, each with six awards.

=== Major awards ===
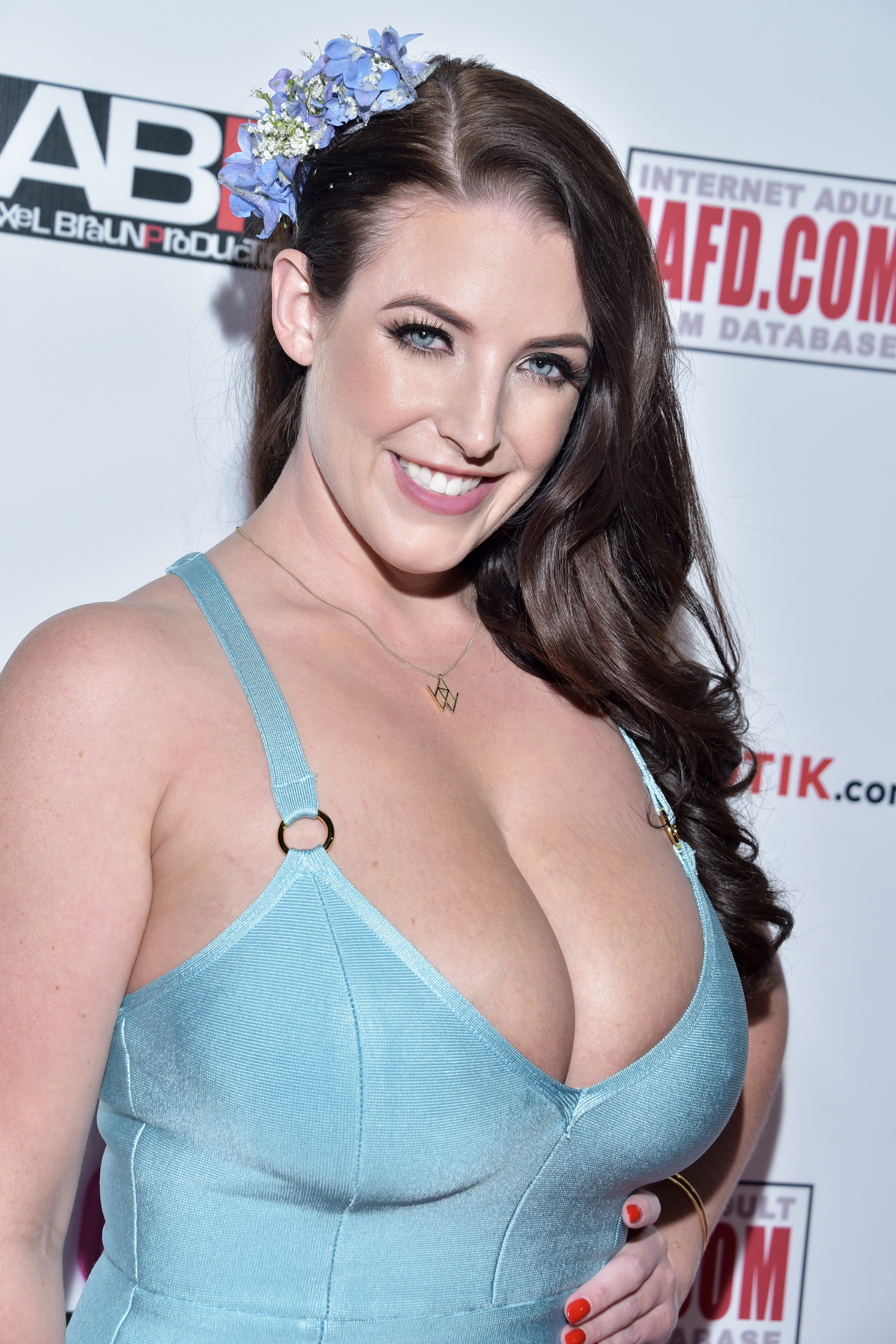
Angela White, winner of the 2018 AVN Female Performer of the Year Award

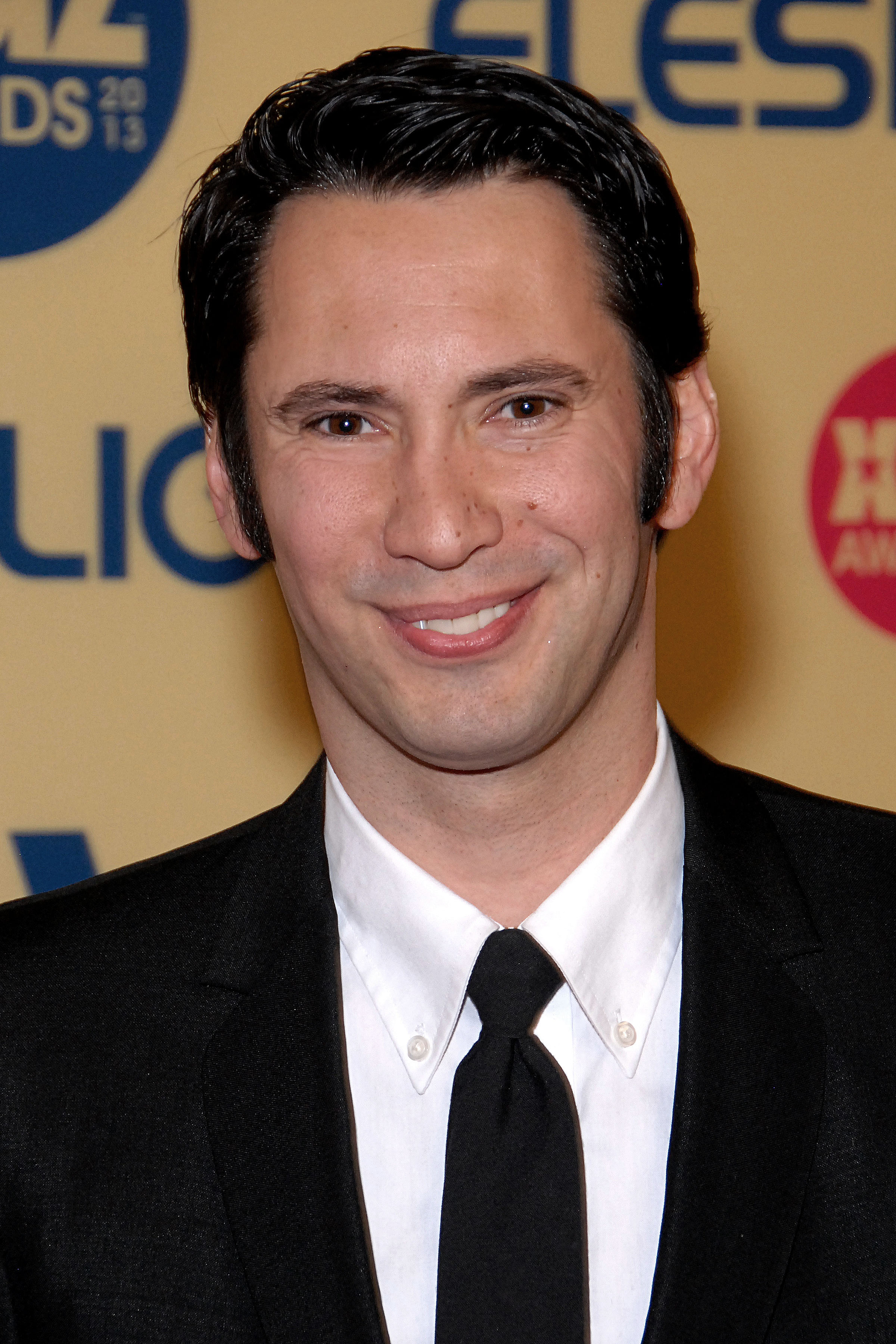
Tommy Pistol, winner of the 2018 Best Actor Award

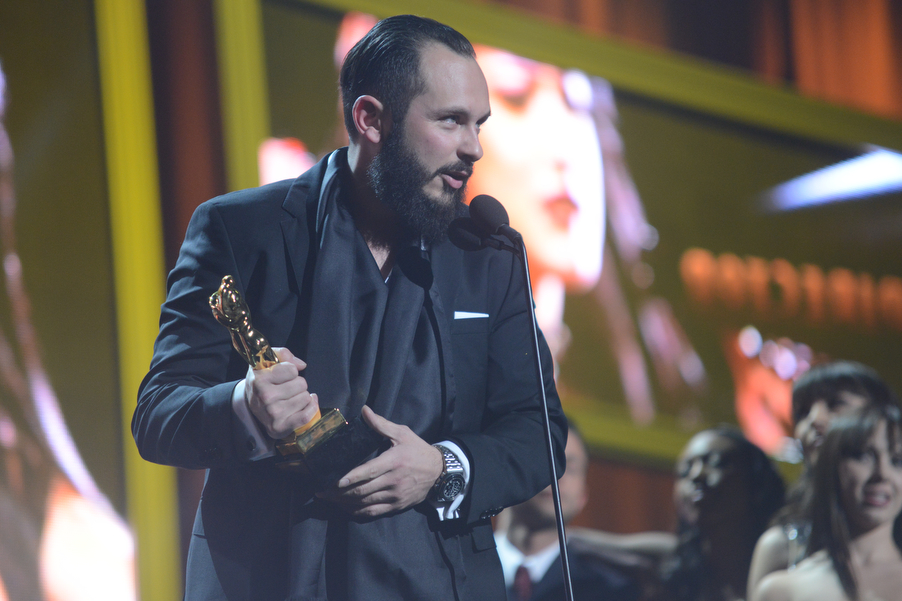
Greg Lansky, Director of the Year for 2018

Winners of categories announced during the awards ceremony January 27, 2018, are highlighted in boldface and indicated with a double dagger (‡).

Movie of the Year	Female Performer of the Year
**Half His Age: A Teenage Tragedy**‡ (Best Drama); Angela 3 (Best Star Showcase); Jews Love Black Cock (Best Comedy); Vampires (Best Action/Thriller); Bulldogs (Best Foreign Feature); Anissa the Tenniswoman (Best Foreign Non-Feature); Justice League XXX: An Axel Braun Parody (Best Parody); Adventures With the Baumgartners (Best Polyamory Movie); Sacrosanct (Best Anthology Movie); Dysfucktional: Blood Is Thicker Than Cum (Best Taboo Relations Movie); (Rather than nominees for this category, contenders are chosen from the winners in the "Best Release" categories. Voting is conducted separately just prior to the awards ceremony.)	**Angela White**‡; August Ames; Adriana Chechik; Abella Danger; Aidra Fox; Keisha Grey; Katrina Jade; Elsa Jean; Eva Lovia; Riley Reid; Lana Rhoades; Jessa Rhodes; Natalia Starr; Gina Valentina
Male Performer of the Year	Best New Starlet
**Markus Dupree**‡; Mick Blue; Xander Corvus; Charles Dera; Manuel Ferrara; Ricky Johnson; Keiran Lee; Mandingo; Ramón Nomar; Tommy Pistol; Toni Ribas; Johnny Sins; Jean Val Jean; Chad White; Prince Yahshua	**Jill Kassidy**‡; Arya Fae; Honey Gold; Eliza Jane; Elena Koshka; Riley Nixon; Giselle Palmer; Lena Paul; Bella Rose; Sofi Ryan; Scarlett Sage; Chloe Scott; Kristen Scott; Violet Starr; Whitney Wright
Transsexual Performer of the Year	Director of the Year
**Aubrey Kate**‡; Foxxy; Dicky Johnson; Casey Kisses; Venus Lux; Natalie Mars; Tori Mayes; Marissa Minx; Mandy Mitchell; Sunshyne Monroe; Chanel Santini; Alexa Scout; Stefani Special; Shiri Trap; Freya Wynn	**Greg Lansky**‡; Joanna Angel; Brad Armstrong; Axel Braun; Stormy Daniels; Jonni Darkko; Manuel Ferrara; Jules Jordan; Ryan Madison; Mason; Bree Mills; Jim Powers; Mike Quasar; Jacky St. James; Stills by Alan
Best Actor	Best Actress
**Tommy Pistol, Ingenue**‡; Brad Armstrong, Takers; Danny D, Bulldogs; Charles Dera, Half His Age: A Teenage Tragedy; Damon Dice, From the First Moment; Ryan Driller, An Inconvenient Mistress; Seth Gamble, Karma; Tyler Knight, Interracial Family Needs; Marcus London, Unbridled; Derrick Pierce, Indirect Relations; Logan Pierce, The Voyeur; Toni Ribas, Blood Sisters; Ryan Ryder, The Altar of Aphrodite; Nacho Vidal, Outland 2: Looking for Freedom; Chad White, Laura	**Sara Luvv, The Faces of Alice**‡; Asa Akira, The Blonde Dahlia; Chloe Amour, Love for Sale 2; Abella Danger, The Obsession; Jessica Drake, An Inconvenient Mistress; Alexis Fawx, Fantasy Factory; Alexa Grace, Crash; Janice Griffith, Ingenue; Jill Kassidy, Half His Age: A Teenage Tragedy; Cassidy Klein, Conflicted; Melissa Moore, The Voyeur; Katie Morgan, Bad Babes Inc.; Ella Nova, Snapshot; Romi Rain, Justice League XXX: An Axel Braun Parody; Angela White, The Altar of Aphrodite
Best Supporting Actress
**Kristen Scott, Half His Age: A Teenage Tragedy**‡; Joanna Angel, My Killer Girlfriend; A.J. Applegate, Adventures With the Baumgartners; Kat Dior, Extradition; Karlee Grey, Ingenue; Nina Hartley, Confessions of a Sinful Nun; Elsa Jean, Nerds; Aaliyah Love, Inner Demons; Kira Noir, Ethni•City; Brett Rossi, Fantasy Factory; Chanel Preston, The Obsession; Layla Sin, Love for Sale 2; Luna Star, Bad Babes Inc.; Violet Starr, The Submission of Emma Marx: Evolved; Charlotte Stokely, Justice League XXX: An Axel Braun Parody
Best Star Showcase	Best Action/Thriller
**Angela 3**‡; Adriana Chechik Is the Squirt Queen; Bombshell Skyla Novea; Cherie; Eva; The Gangbang of Riley Reid; I Am Katrina; The Insatiable Miss Jessa Rhodes; Jasmine Jae No Holds Barred; Jessica Drake Is Wicked; Kendra’s Obsession; Lana; Riley Goes Gonzo 2; Sexxxploitation of Leya Falcon AKA Whorley Quinn; Tori Black Is Back	**Vampires**‡; Agent 69; The Altar of Aphrodite; Blood Sisters; Crash; Extradition; From Beyond; An Inconvenient Mistress; Lay Her Down; My Killer Girlfriend; Pussy or Lead; Quest; Takers; Transmission; Vendetta
Best Comedy	Best Drama
**Jews Love Black Cock**‡; Amish Girls 2; Bad Babes Inc.; The Blonde Dahlia; Conflicted; Consequences of a Kiss; Corrupted by the Evils of Fetish Porn; Don't Screw My Mom; The Faces of Alice; Forked; My Wife’s Hot Sister; Nerds; The Next Big Step; Viking Girls Gone Horny; Women Getting Even	**Half His Age: A Teenage Tragedy**‡; The Artist Within; The Babysitter 11; The Candidate; Confessions of a Sinful Nun; Ethni•City; Exposed; Fantasy Factory; Ingenue; Inner Demons; Love on the Line; The Obsession; Spoiled; Unbridled; The Voyeur
Best Boy/Girl Sex Scene	Best Girl/Girl Sex Scene
**Angela White, Manuel Ferrara; Angela 3**‡; Riley Reid, Ryan Madison; 2:27:48 Real Time Sex; Chanel Preston, Chad White; The Altar of Aphrodite; Kristen Scott, Tommy Pistol; Bound for Sex 2; Melissa Moore, Markus Dupree; Cuties 10; Gia Paige, James Deen; Darker Side of Desire; Katrina Jade, Seth Gamble; Exposed; Jill Kassidy, Charles Dera; Half His Age: A Teenage Tragedy; Karlee Grey, Manuel Ferrara; Karlee Grey Gets Her Pussy Fucked Unscripted; Kendra Sunderland, Jason Brown; Kendra’s Obsession; Kimmy Granger, Chris Strokes; Kimmy Gets Fucked and Abused; Eva Lovia, Xander Corvus; My Wife's Hot Sister; Brett Rossi, James Deen; Oil Explosion 2; Honey Gold, Mick Blue; Sacrosanct; Vicki Chase, Johnny Sins; Young & Beautiful 3	**Katrina Jade, Kissa Sins; I Am Katrina**‡; Violet Starr, Anya Olsen; Cheer Squad Sleepovers 20; Shyla Jennings, Jenna Sativa; Erotic Encounters 2; Alex Grey, Kristen Scott; Hollywood Hills Hijinx; Melissa Moore, Verónica Rodríguez; Kristen Scott’s Skip Day; Lana Rhoades, Olivia Nova; Lana Is Olivia's Dream; Aiden Ashley, Darcie Dolce; Lesbian Performers of the Year 2017; Gina Valentina, Jaye Summers; Lesbian Schoolgirls; Alexa Grace, Christiana Cinn; Lesbian Sex Therapist 2; Gia Paige, Adria Rae; Panty Raid; Nikki Hearts, Leigh Raven; Prison Lesbians 5; Brett Rossi, Megan Rain; Schoolgirl Massacre; Abigail Mac, Olive Glass; Spoiled; Aidra Fox, Tori Black; Tori Black Is Back; Riley Reid, Kendra Sunderland; Unexpected Feelings
Best Anal Sex Scene	Best Oral Sex Scene
**Lana Rhoades, Markus Dupree; Anal Savages 3**‡; Adriana Chechik, James Deen; Adriana Chechik Is the Extreme Anal Queen; Blair Williams, Christian Clay; Anal Beauty 7; Aidra Fox, Erik Everhard; Anal Fuck Dolls 2; Dakota, Sean Michaels; Anal Warriors 3; Angela White, Markus Dupree; Angela Loves Anal; Natalia Starr, James Deen; Back in the Butt; Mia Malkova, Markus Dupree; Big Anal Asses 6; Riley Nixon, Ramón Nomar; Blast My Ass; Abella Danger, Toni Ribas; Curvy Girls 8; Goldie Rush, Mike Adriano; Deep in That Ass 3; Keisha Grey, Dredd; Dredd; Marley Brinx, Prince Yahshua; Interracial & Anal 4; Ariana Marie, Christian Clay; Natural Beauties 2; Casey Calvert, Markus Dupree; Psychotic Behavior	**Aidra Fox, Jason Katana, Donny Sins, Filthy Rich, Hunter, Mark Zane, Brad Hart, Robby Echo, Wrex Oliver, Rob Banks, Chad Alva; Facialized 4**‡; Heather Lexi, Riley Reyes, Eric John; Blow Bar 2; Christiana Cinn, Brad Knight; Brad Knight’s Blow n’ Go Girls; Joseline Kelly, Ricky Johnson; Dirty Girl; Gina Valentina, Codey Steele, Cyrus King, Jake Jace, Robby Echo, Ryan McLane, Small Hands; Fill My Throat; Jill Kassidy, Ike Diezel; I Just Wanna Suck You Dry; Jessica Drake, Ricky Johnson, Rob Piper, Isiah Maxwell, Dirk Huge; Jessica Drake Is Wicked; Karlee Grey, Donny Sins, Filthy Rich, Hunter, Jack Vegas, Jason Katana, Mark Zane, Rob Banks; Karlee Grey's 1st Blow Bang; Kasey Warner, Brad Knight; Kasey Warner Comes Over to Suck My Boyfriend's Dick; Melissa Moore, Chad Alva, Brad Hart, Ryan McLane, Filthy Rich, Eric John; My First Blowbang!; Jessa Rhodes, Mark White; Superstar BJ's; Blair Williams, Sarah Vandella, Mike Adriano; Swallowed.com; Anna de Ville, Anthony Rosano; Throat & Tit Fucking Teen; Veronica Avluv, 15 cocksmen; Veronica vs. Davina: 31 Cumshots – MILF Edition; Vicki Chase, Justin Hunt; Vicki Chase Gives a Therapeutic Suck Job
Favorite Camming Cosplayer	Favorite Cam Girl
**Catjira**‡	**Kati3kat**‡

=== Additional award winners ===
The following is the list of remaining award categories, which were presented apart from the actual awards ceremony.

**CONTENT CATEGORIES**

- All-Girl Performer of the Year: Jenna Sativa
- Best All-Girl Group Sex Scene: Melissa Moore, Elsa Jean, Adria Rae Best New Starlets 2017
- Best All-Girl Movie: Angela Loves Women 3
- Best All-Girl Series: Women Seeking Women
- Best Amateur/Pro-Am Movie: Amateur Introductions 24
- Best Anal Movie: Anal Savages 3
- Best Anal Series: Anal Savages
- Best Anthology Movie: Sacrosanct
- Best Art Direction: Justice League XXX: An Axel Braun Parody
- Best BDSM Movie: Cybill Troy Is Vicious
- Best Cinematography: Winston Henry, Sacrosanct
- Best Continuing Series: Angela Loves ...
- Best Director – Feature: Axel Braun, Justice League XXX: An Axel Braun Parody
- Best Director – Foreign Feature: Hervé Bodilis, Pascal Lucas, Revenge of a Daughter
- Best Director – Foreign Non-Feature: Hervé Bodilis, Megan Escort Deluxe
- Best Director – Non-Feature: Kayden Kross, Sacrosanct
- Best Double-Penetration Sex Scene: Angela White, Markus Dupree, Mick Blue, Angela 3
- Best Editing: Angela White, Angela 3
- Best Ethnic Movie: Asian Anal
- Best Ethnic/Interracial Series: Black & White
- Best Foreign Feature: Bulldogs
- Best Foreign Non-Feature: Anissa the Tenniswoman
- Best Foreign Series: Rocco’s Psycho Teens
- Best Gonzo Movie: Manuel’s Fucking POV 7
- Best Group Sex Scene: Angela White, Mick Blue, Xander Corvus, Markus Dupree, Toni Ribas, John Strong, Angela 3
- Best Ingénue Movie: Young Fantasies 2
- Best Interracial Movie: Interracial Icon 4
- Best Lewd Propositions Movie: Babysitter Auditions
- Best Makeup: Dusty, May Kup, Cammy Ellis, Justice League XXX: An Axel Braun Parody
- Best Male Newcomer: Wes Meadows (Vacated; Given to Juan “El Caballo” Loco)
- Best Marketing Campaign – Individual Project: Justice League XXX: An Axel Braun Parody
- Best Marketing Campaign – Company Image: Vixen
- Best MILF Movie: MILF Performers of the Year 2017
- Best New Imprint: Pure Taboo
- Best New Series: Young & Beautiful
- Best Niche Movie: Cum Inside Me 3
- Best Niche Series: Squirt for Me
- Best Non-Sex Performance: Kyle Stone, Conflicted
- Best Older Woman/Younger Girl Movie: The Art of Older Women
- Best Oral Movie: Facialized 4
- Best Orgy/Gangbang Movie: My First Gangbang
- Best Parody: Justice League XXX: An Axel Braun Parody
- Best Polyamory Movie: Adventures With the Baumgartners
- Best Screenplay: Will Ryder, Bad Babes Inc.
- Best Sex Scene in a Foreign-Shot Production: Claire Castel, Kristof Cale, Math, Ricky Mancini; Claire Desires of Submission
- Best Solo/Tease Performance: Angela White, Angela 3
- Best Soundtrack: The Altar of Aphrodite
- Best Special Effects: Justice League XXX: An Axel Braun Parody

**Content (ctd.)**

- Best Supporting Actor: Small Hands, Half His Age: A Teenage Tragedy
- Best Taboo Relations Movie: Dysfucktional: Blood Is Thicker Than Cum
- Best Three-Way Sex Scene – Boy/Boy/Girl: Kendra Sunderland, Jason Brown, Ricky Johnson; Kendra’s Obsession
- Best Three-Way Sex Scene – Girl/Girl/Boy: Riley Reid, Megan Rain, Mick Blue; Young & Beautiful
- Best Transsexual Movie: All My Mother’s Lovers, Buck Angel Superstar (tie)
- Best Transsexual Series: Hot for Transsexuals
- Best Transsexual Sex Scene: Adriana Chechik, Aubrey Kate, Adriana Chechik Is the Squirt Queen
- Best Virtual Reality Product/Site: BadoinkVR.com
- Best Virtual Reality Sex Scene: Adriana Chechik, Megan Rain, Arya Fae, Tommy Gunn; "Zombie Slayers", WankzVR.com
- Best Web Director: Mike Adriano
- Clever Title of the Year: Black Loads Matter
- Female Foreign Performer of the Year: Jasmine Jae
- Mainstream Star of the Year: Asa Akira
- Male Foreign Performer of the Year: Ryan Ryder
- MILF Performer of the Year: Cherie DeVille
- Most Outrageous Sex Scene: Leya Falcon, Ophelia Rain in “Well There’s ONE Place You Can Put an AVN Award”, Viking Girls Gone Horny
- Niche Performer of the Year: Cybill Troy

**PLEASURE PRODUCTS**

- Best Condom Manufacturer: Paradise Lubricated Condom
- Best Enhancement Manufacturer: Bedroom Products
- Best Fetish Manufacturer: XR Brands
- Best Lingerie or Apparel Manufacturer: Fantasy Lingerie
- Best Lubricant Manufacturer: Wicked Sensual Care
- Best Pleasure Product Manufacturer – Small: Clandestine Devices
- Best Pleasure Product Manufacturer – Medium: We-Vibe
- Best Pleasure Product Manufacturer – Large: Topco Sales

**RETAIL & DISTRIBUTION**

- Best Boutique: Pepper's Parties Too (Hattiesburg, MS)
- Best Retail Chain – Small: Inz & Outz
- Best Retail Chain – Medium: The Pleasure Chest
- Best Retail Chain – Large: Castle Megastore
- Best Web Retail Store: AdultEmpire.com

**FAN AWARDS**

- Favorite BBW Performer: Angelina Castro
- Favorite Cam Guy: Aamir Desire
- Favorite Camming Couple: 19honeysuckle (aka Honey & Tom Christian)
- Favorite Female Porn Star: Angela White
- Favorite Indie Clip Star: Jenny Blighe
- Favorite Membership Site: BrazzersNetwork.com
- Favorite Male Porn Star: Johnny Sins
- Favorite Porn Star Website: Angela White
- Favorite Trans Cam Star: Aubrey Kate
- Favorite Trans Porn Star: Chanel Santini
- Hottest MILF: Kendra Lust
- Hottest Newcomer: Lena Paul
- Most Amazing Sex Toy: Angela White Fleshlight
- Most Epic Ass: Alexis Texas
- Most Spectacular Boobs: Angela White
- Social Media Star: Riley Reid

=== Multiple nominations and awards ===
Justice League XXX: An Axel Braun Parody and Angela 3, each with six, were the movies that won the most awards. Half His Age: A Teenage Tragedy was next with four trophies while Sacrosanct won three. Facialized 4 and Anal Savages 3 won two apiece while the Anal Savages series also won a best series award. Angela Loves Women 3 also won an award in addition to being part of the Angela Loves... series, which also won a best series award.

Justice League XXX: An Axel Braun Parody also had the most nominations, with 13.

== AVN Honorary Awards ==
=== Hall of Fame ===
AVN on January 6, 2018, announced the 2017 inductees into its hall of fame, who were later honored with a January 23 cocktail party and then a video as the awards show opened.

- Video Branch: Alexis Amore, Eva Angelina, William H., Brandon Iron, Jessica Jaymes, Sunny Leone, Nick Orleans, Kirsten Price, Mike Ranger, David Stanley, Celeste Star, Aiden Starr, Devlin Weed, Angela White, Michael Zen
- Executive Branch: Marc Bruder, Mara Epstein, Rondee Kamins
- Founders Branch: Mark Kulkis, David Joseph, Chuck Zane
- Internet Founders Branch: Brad Mitchell

== Presenters and performers ==
AVN announced the 2018 AVN Awards Trophy Girls would be Ayumi Anime and Sofi Ryan.

Hip-hop artist Lil Wayne performed several musical numbers during the show. Comedian and master of ceremonies Aries Spears cracked jokes and appeared in several comedy skits with various adult industry luminaries.

== Ceremony information ==
For the first time, content released exclusively on membership websites was eligible for AVN Awards consideration in any sex scene category. AVN also added two new categories in the Web and Technology area: Best New Website and Best Clip Website. In addition, Best Specialty Movie - Other Genre and Best Specialty Series - Other Genre were renamed Best Niche Movie and Series and a new category, Niche Performer of the Year, was added. At the nominations unveiling, two more new categories, Best Action/Thriller and Best Lewd Propositions Movie were announced. Favorite BBW Performer was added later as a fan-voted category for 2018. Another new fan category for 2018 was Favorite Cosplay Cam Cosplayer.

Porn legend Ron Jeremy was banned from the year's awards show. AVN felt he violated its code of conduct based on a Rolling Stone article published in November 2017, in which he was accused of sexual misconduct.

== In Memoriam ==
As the show was beginning, AVN used a video segment to pay a tribute to adult-industry personalities who had died since the 2017 awards show: James Baes, Sean Barnett, Ron Harris, Hugh Hefner, Morton Hyatt, Sonny Landham, Radley Metzger, Jocalyn Pink, January Seraph, Greg Steel, Michael Zen, Roxy Nicole, Olivia Nova, Olivia Lua, Yurizan Beltran, Shyla Stylez, August Ames.

== See also ==
- AVN Awards
- AVN Award for Male Performer of the Year
- AVN Award for Female Performer of the Year
- AVN Award for Transsexual Performer of the Year
- AVN Award for Male Foreign Performer of the Year
- AVN Award for Female Foreign Performer of the Year
- List of members of the AVN Hall of Fame
