= 37th AVN Awards =

US adult industry award ceremony in 2020

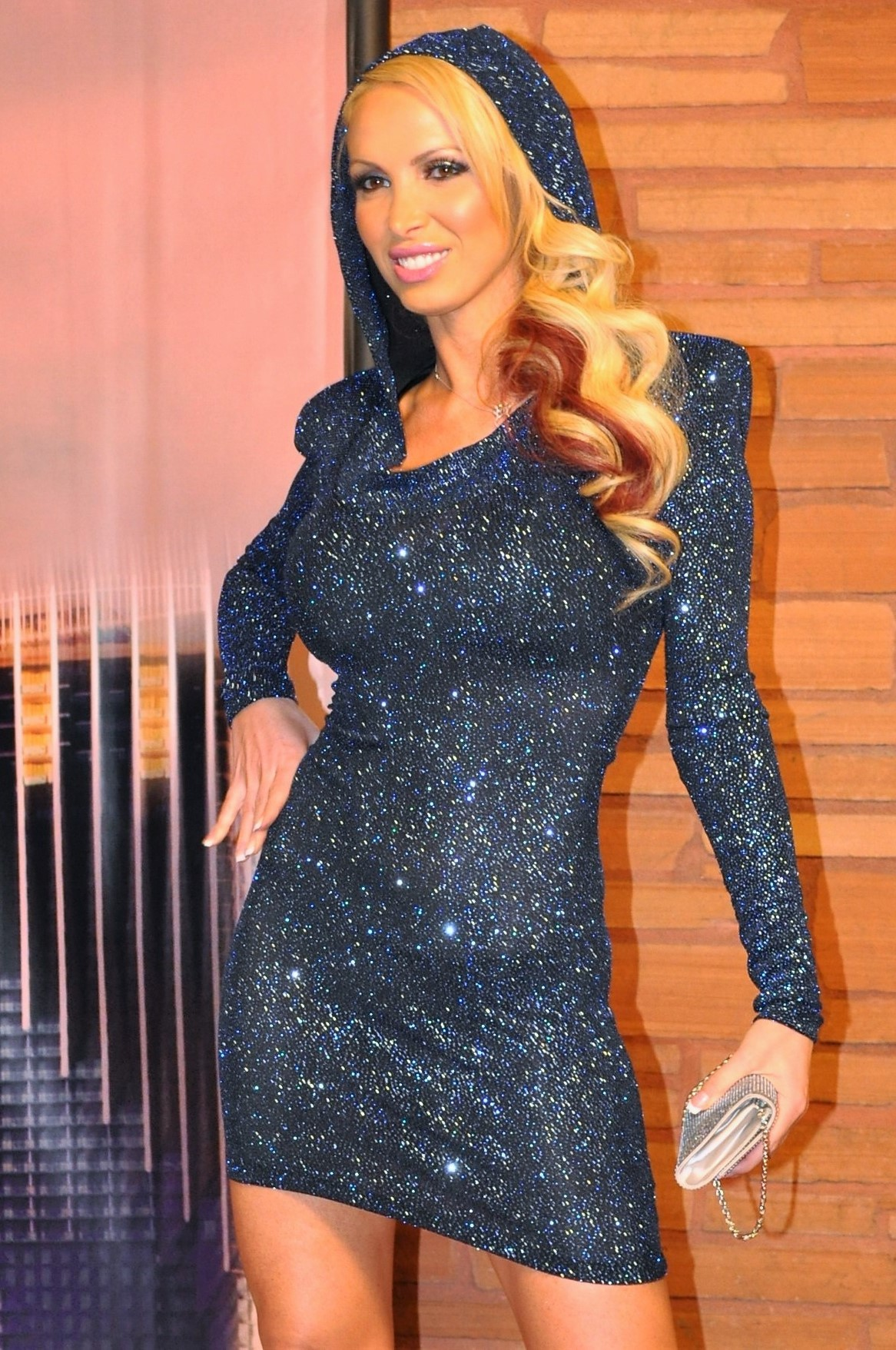
- Nikki Benz hosted the 37th AVN Awards.
- Date: January 25, 2020
- Site: Hard Rock Hotel & Casino; Las Vegas, Nevada
- Hosted by: Nikki Benz and Emily Bloom

Highlights
- Best Film: Teenage Lesbian
- Most awards: Perspective (4); Angela White (11)
- Most nominations: Angela White (16)

Television coverage
- Network: Showtime

The 37th AVN Awards was a pornography award show recognizing the best actresses, actors, directors and films in the adult industry in 2019. Nominations were announced at a ceremony on November 24, 2019, at the Avalon Hollywood.

The show was held on January 25, 2020, at the Hard Rock Hotel and Casino in Las Vegas. It was broadcast on Showtime. The awards show was hosted by adult star Nikki Benz, MyFreeCams celebrity Emily Bloom, along with comedian Aries Spears. The 37th AVN Awards was noteworthy as one of the last events held at the Hard Rock Hotel and Casino in Las Vegas, before the facility's closure on February 3, 2020.

Musical guests featured Beyond Glascow, Doja Cat and DJ Diplo. Doja Cat performed songs off her album Hot Pink, including "Juicy". DJ Diplo featured musician Lil Pump performing his Kanye West collaboration, "I Love It". Actress Angela White won Female Performer of the Year; she became the first actress in history to win the award three times in a row. Maitland Ward, a mainstream actress-turned pornographic actress previously known from Boy Meets World and The Bold and the Beautiful, was recognized with multiple awards after debuting in the adult industry in 2019. The 2020 awards was the first time a film from Greece received a nomination for Best Foreign Production.

== Show overview ==
The event was held inside the Hard Rock Hotel and Casino in Las Vegas at the music venue called The Joint. The 37th AVN Awards was presented by MyFreeCams. Referred to in the media as "the Oscars of porn", the event honors excellence in the adult industry. Las Vegas has hosted the event since 1998. The AVN Awards draws 50,000 to the annual show and surrounding events. In the week leading up to the ceremony, it was preceded by the GayVN Awards, and a trade show. The Hard Rock Hotel and Casino closed on February 3, 2020, to be replaced by the Virgin Hotels Las Vegas. The AVN Awards signed a contract with Virgin Hotels Las Vegas through the year 2023 to continue the event at the new location. The Daily Beast observed of the fact that the 37th AVN Awards was one of the last events held in the establishment, "There is no more fitting end for the rock and roll-themed hotel than the festival of debauchery that is AVN Awards week, a four-day adult entertainment convention that ends with the racy 'Oscars of Porn.'" Parties coinciding with the 37th AVN Awards included the Lair Fetish Party the day before, and the AVN Awards After Party the night of the event at the Vanity Night Club.

=== Presenters ===
Presenting the 37th AVN Awards were Emily Bloom and adult star Nikki Benz. Emily Bloom was known from MyFreeCams, and garnered the award for Favorite Cam Girl. Comedian Aries Spears, who previously co-hosted the 35th AVN Awards in 2018, returned to co-host. The awards event was managed by executive producers AVN chief executive officer Tony Rios along with Gary Miller. Benz and Bloom reprised their roles for a May 2020 live stream of the event; they were joined for the live stream by adult film stars Small Hands, Penny Pax, Vicki Chase, Violet Doll, Maitland Ward, Joanna Angel, Gianna Dior, and Angela White. The live stream event was held on AVN Stars — a social media site started in January 2020 at the AVN Adult Entertainment Expo. AVN Awards executive producer Gary Miller posed questions to the celebrities during the 90-minute live stream event.

=== Performers ===
Musical performances by rapper Doja Cat and DJ Diplo occurred throughout the show. Doja Cat commented to AllHipHop, "I’m honored and excited to be the second woman ever to perform at the AVN Awards." Journalist Rosario Harper noted for SOHH that Doja Cat was following in the footsteps of Kanye West and Cardi B following a trend of hip hop music stars headlining at the AVN Awards. Layla Halabian reviewed Doja Cat's fashion choice favorably for Nylon, "In her latest move, the rapper performed at the 2020 AVN Adult Entertainment Awards in Las Vegas on January 25 in a truly unforgettable nude mesh bodysuit, complete with rhinestone silhouettes highlighting her nipples, butt, and that most maligned of body hair — pubes." Doja Cat performed songs from her 2019 album Hot Pink, including "Juicy", and "Cyber Sex".

DJ Diplo featured musician Lil Pump in his performance. Lil Pump performed from his collaboration with Kanye West, titled, "I Love It". Jed Gregorio of the Inquirer commented favorably of Diplo's outfit at the event, "Thomas Wesley a.k.a Diplo attended 'the only award show that matters this weekend' wearing probably the only outfit that, in fact, mattered this weekend." Gregorio observed, "The event is question is the 2020 Adult Video News Awards in Las Vegas, where the DJ performed wearing a baby pink cowboy hat, a baby pink suit, and brown suede boots. The fit, fabricated by Union Western Clothing, features some delicious iconography, including a guy getting it on with a mermaid, some minotaur action, and anthropomorphic mushrooms." Union Western Clothing worked with Diplo in advance of the AVN Awards specifically to craft an outfit for the event itself.

== Winners and nominees ==
=== Major awards ===
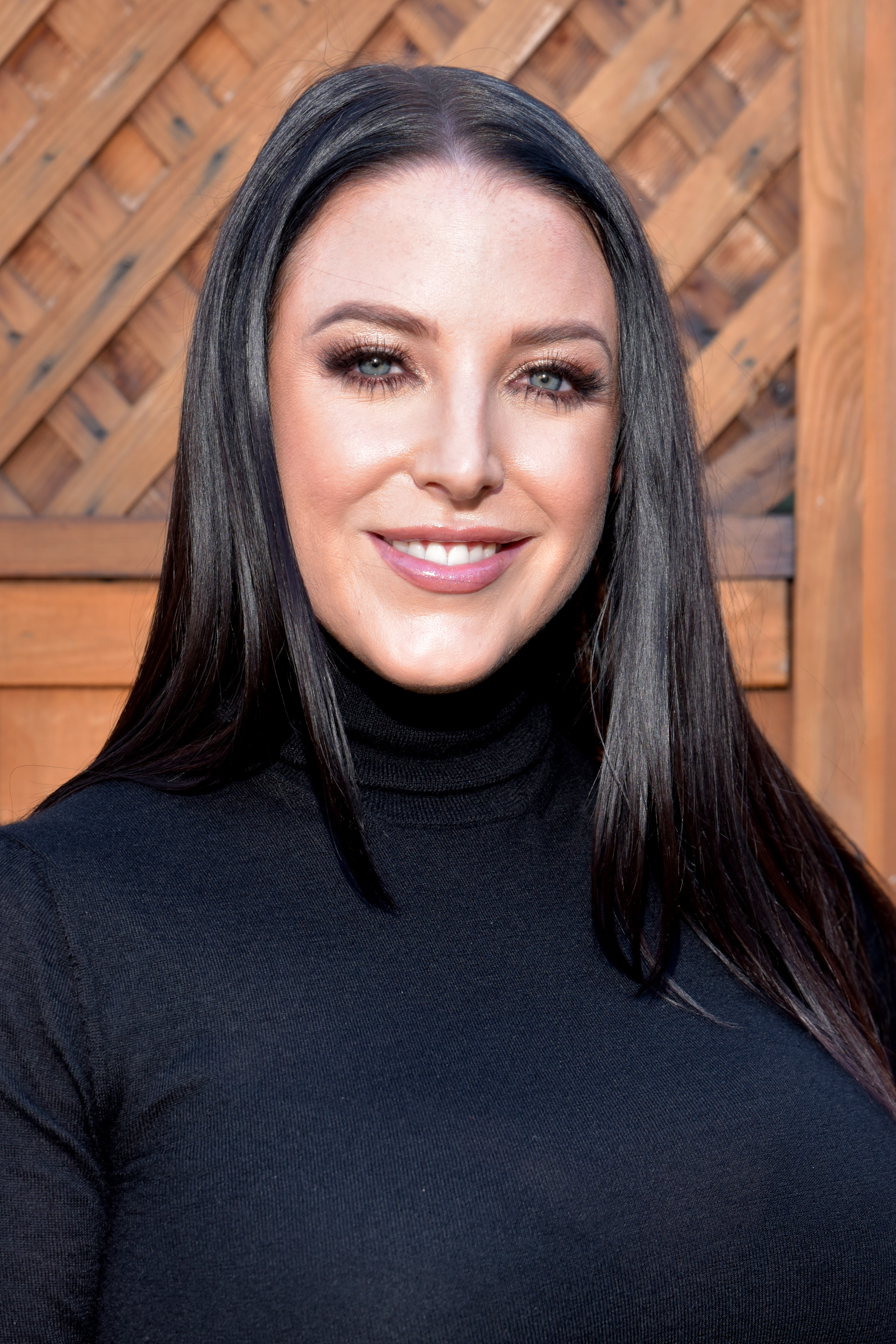
Angela White won the night's main award, for Female Performer of the Year, becoming the first person to win this trophy three times in a row.

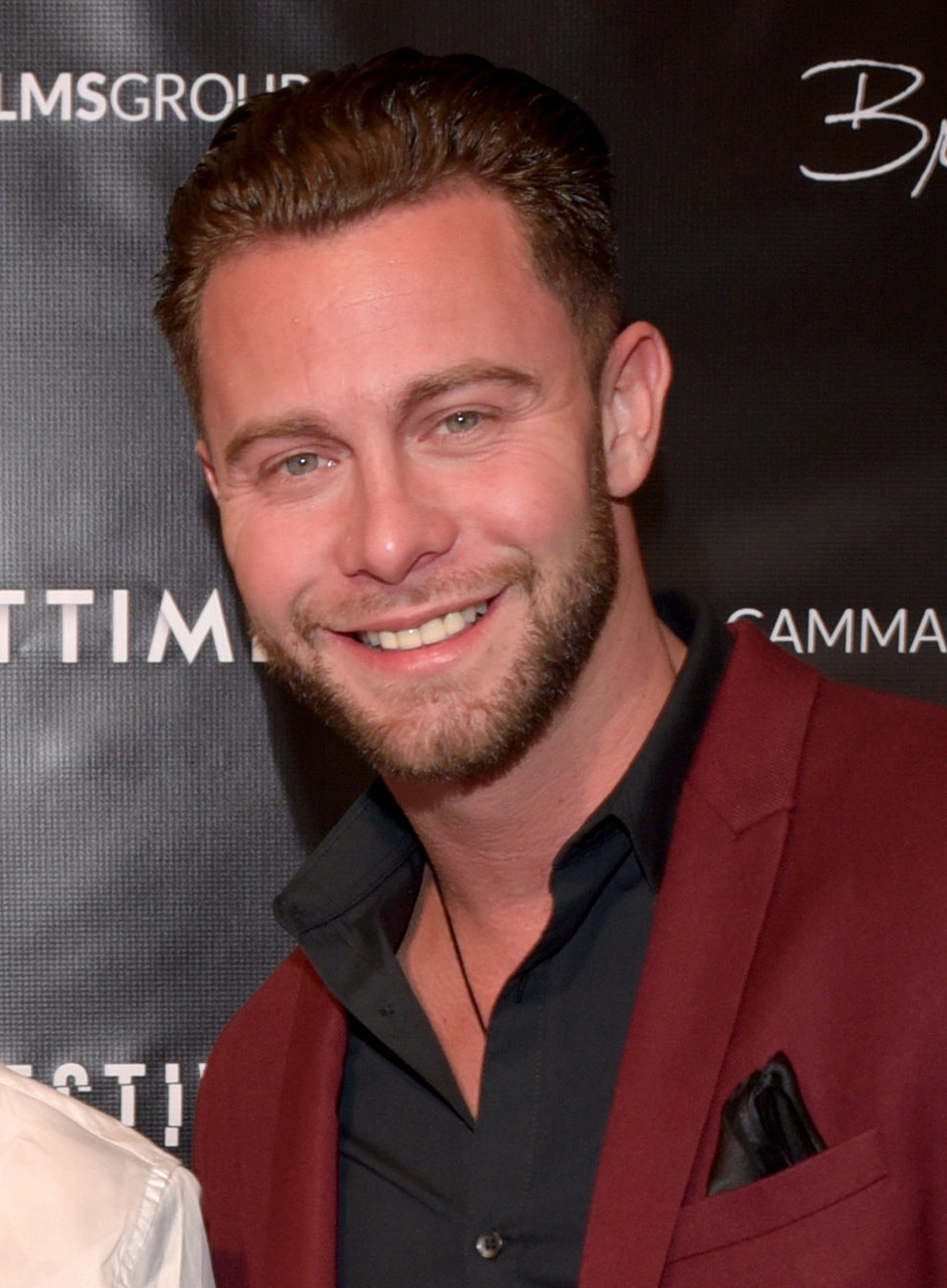
Seth Gamble, winner of the 2020 Best Actor Award

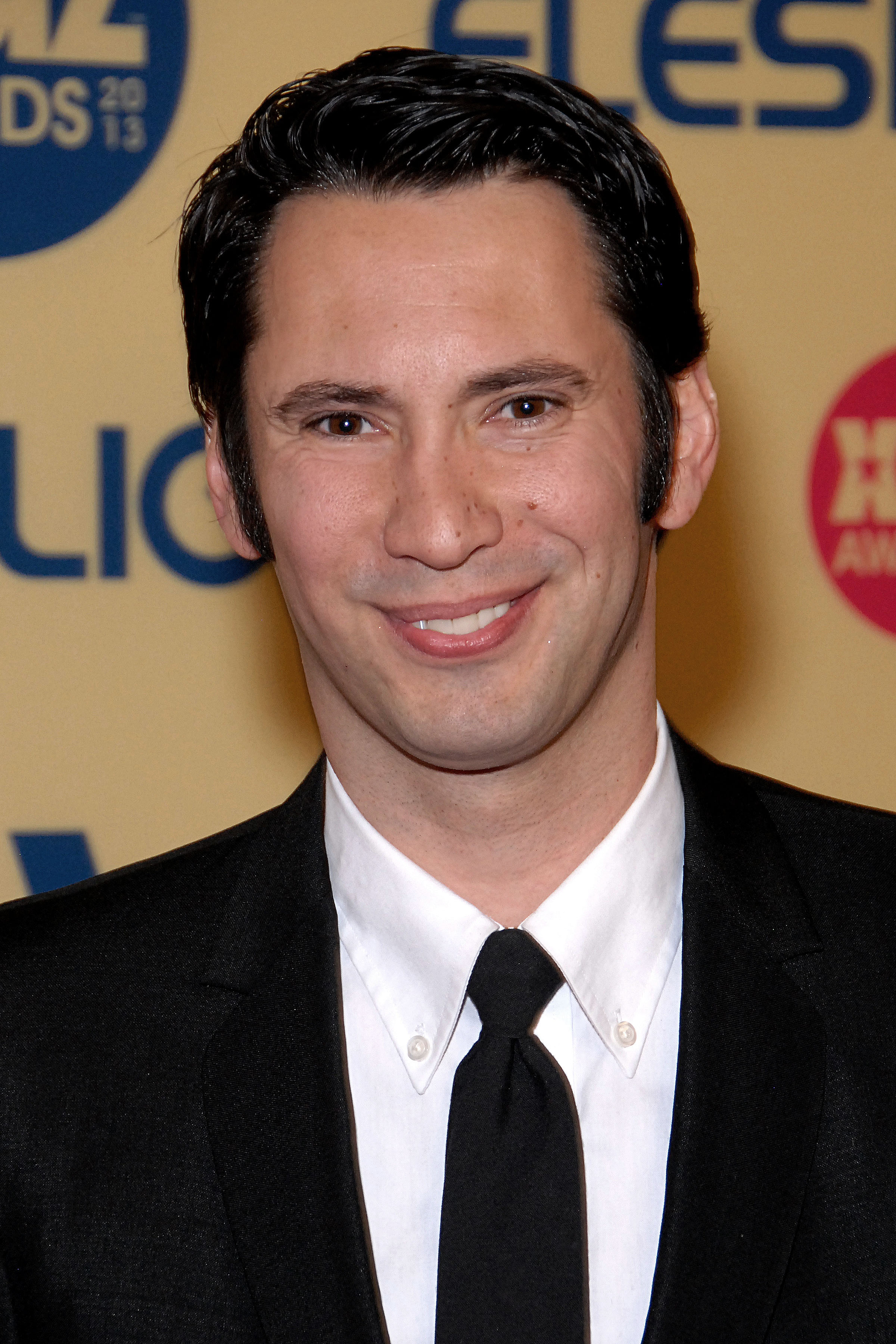
Tommy Pistol, winner of the 2020 Best Supporting Actor Award

Angela White won the night's main award, for Female Performer of the Year, becoming the first person to win this trophy three times in a row. Writing for The Daily Beast columnist Aurora Snow commented of her achievement, "she became the first woman ever to win three consecutive years; an unusual accolade for any female performer to receive".

Maitland Ward, a mainstream actress-turned pornographic actress who previously starred as Rachel McGuire on the sitcom Boy Meets World and Jessica Forrester on the soap opera The Bold and the Beautiful, was recognized with multiple awards at the ceremony. Ward debuted in the adult film industry in 2019 and became the brand ambassador of the adult content creator Deeper. Ward had a starring role in the adult production Drive directed by Kayden Kross. Drive was Ward's first feature film role in the adult industry. Ward took honors for Best Supporting Actress, Best Three-Way Sex Scene, and Favorite Camming Cosplayer. She frequently attends comic book conventions and participates in cosplay. Kayden Cross took Best Director - Dramatic Production for Drive, as well as Director of the Year after a prior win in the same category the year before.

The 37th AVN Awards was the first time a film from Greece was recognized with a nomination for Best Foreign Production. Adult film industry director Dimitris Sirinakis, commonly known within the industry as the Greek King of Porn, and his production company Sirina Productions received the nomination. Sirinakis was nominated for his film, Filthy Rich Games.

Natalie Mars received the award for Transgender Performer of the Year. Additionally, the film starring Mars, Transfixed: Natalie Mars Showcase, won the award for Best Transgender Production. Mars was also voted Favorite Trans Cam Star and Favorite Trans Porn Star. Mars joined the adult industry four and a half years prior, and had previously received nominations for Performer of the Year in the three previous AVN Awards.

Axel Braun, a prior inductee to the AVN Hall of Fame, garnered the award for Best Parody for his film in the Wicked Comix series, Captain Marvel XXX: An Axel Braun Parody. This was his tenth win in the category in a row. The same film also won awards for Best Special Effects and Best Makeup for Dusty Lynn, Best Soundtrack, and Best Transgender One-on-One Sex Scene for Kenzie Taylor and Aubrey Kate.

Bold indicates winner.

Female Performer of the Year	Male Performer of the Year
Joanna Angel; Adriana Chechik; Abella Danger; Ana Foxxx; Alina Lopez; Abigail Mac; Kira Noir; Kenzie Reeves; Riley Reid; Karma Rx; Kristen Scott; **Angela White**; Jane Wilde; Emily Willis; Whitney Wright	Mick Blue; Xander Corvus; Charles Dera; Ryan Driller; Markus Dupree; Manuel Ferrara; Seth Gamble; Small Hands; Steve Holmes; Ricky Johnson; Keiran Lee; Isiah Maxwell; Ramón Nomar; Derrick Pierce; Tommy Pistol
MILF Performer of the Year	Director of the Year
Britney Amber; Bridgette B.; Dana DeArmond; Cherie DeVille; Nina Elle; **Alexis Fawx**; Reagan Foxx; Brandi Love; Kendra Lust; Katie Morgan; London River; Richelle Ryan; Silvia Saige; India Summer; Sarah Vandella	Joanna Angel; Kay Brandt; Axel Braun; François Clousot; Jonni Darkko; Manuel Ferrara; Ricky Greenwood; Jules Jordan; **Kayden Kross**; Mason; Bree Mills; Aiden Riley; Jacky St. James; Chris Streams; Missa X
Best New Starlet	Best Male Newcomer
Vanna Bardot; Gabbie Carter; Kiara Cole; Keira Croft; **Gianna Dior**; Autumn Falls; Athena Faris; Aria Lee; Lacy Lennon; Lexi Lore; Izzy Lush; Paige Owens; Danni Rivers; Vina Sky; Naomi Swann	Billy Boston; Rod Jackson; Alex Jett; Johnny the Kid; Jason Moody; Will Pounder; Pressure the Entertainer; Duncan Saint; Ricky Spanish; Michael Swayze
Best Actress - Featurette	Best Actor - Featurette
Joanna Angel, Maid of Honor (Dysfunctional Marriage | DVD); Evelyn Claire, Dibs on Mom; Kiara Cole, Game of Bones 2: Winter Came Everywhere; Abella Danger, Her & Him; Alexis Fawx, Seen Not Heard: An Alexis Fawx Story; Shyla Jennings, The Bully Episodes 3 & 4; Alina Lopez, Bishop's Interview: An Alina Lopez Story; Cadence Lux, Bad Samaritans; Kristen Scott, For Your Own Good; **Ivy Wolfe, If It Feels Right**	Nathan Bronson, Dibs on Mom; Dick Chibbles, Bishop's Interview: An Alina Lopez Story; Lucas Frost, Father Recall (Future Darkly: The Complete Second Season | DVD); Small Hands, Her & Him; Steve Holmes, The Daughter Deal; Tyler Knight, The Cookie Jar (A Father Unleashed | DVD); **Tommy Pistol, The Aura Doll (Future Darkly: The Complete Second Season | DVD)**; Donnie Rock, Game of Bones 2: Winter Came Everywhere; Michael Vegas, Face to Face (Consequences | DVD); Zac Wild, If It Feels Right
Best Girl/Girl Scene	Best Boy/Girl Scene
Confessions of a Sinful Nun 2: The Rise of Sister Mona — Charlotte Stokely & Kenna James; Endless — Avi Love & Lacy Lennon; Lesbian Encounters — Abella Danger & Jane Wilde; Lesbian Obsessions 3 — Alex Coal & Prinzzess; Lesbian Performers of the Year 2019 — Serena Blair & Milana Ricci; Nerd's Breaking Point (Lesbian Revenge | DVD) — Gianna Dior & Emily Willis; Out With a Bang — Alina Lopez & Cecilia Lion; Sex & Lies — Ana Foxxx & Serene Siren; **Teenage Lesbian — Aidra Fox & Kristen Scott**; When Boys Are Away — Sabina Rouge & Autumn Falls	Angela White — Angela White & Mick Blue; The Hook (Sacrosanct Now | DVD) — Ashley Lane & Mickey Mod; Hotel Hookup (Use Me, Lose Me | DVD) — Kenzie Reeves & James Deen; I'm Cold (No Going Back | DVD) — AJ Applegate & Damon Dice; If It Feels Right — Ivy Wolfe & Zac Wild; Sex Machines — Gabbie Carter & Manuel Ferrara; **Unlocked (Relentless | DVD) — Gianna Dior & Mick Blue**; The Wedding Singer (Black & White 16 | DVD) — Riley Steele & Jason Luv; Wet Pussy Seduction — Autumn Falls & Markus Dupree; Worship Me — Desiree Dulce & Johnny Castle
Favorite Cam Girl	Trans-sexual Performer of the Year
Abbey Rhode; Alexa MFC; Aphia DeMieux; Ariana Gray; Ashlyn Diamond; Asiri Ocean; Abrilee; Bailey Rayne; Bonnie Rabbit; Brielle Day; ChellieDD; Christy Foxx; Christy Love; Cosmic Neko; DaisyDestin; Dani Lynn; Dawn Willow; EliseLaurenne; Ella Silver; **Emily Bloom**; Emily Lynne; Fae Breen; Ginger Banks; GingerMFC; GymBunny; Happylilcamgirl; HelloCourtney; JadeChampagne; Jasper Ahptik; Jenny Blighe; JoleneMarz; Kati3Kat; Kayla Rose; Kim Morris; Kitty; lacey Bender; Lady Starr; lana Mars; LilCanadianGirl; Lila Ellis; Lili (aka lilimissarab); Lindsey Banks; Lindsey Leigh; Lissa Tyler; London Bunz Bunny; Madilaine; Mary Moody; MayaBum; Melisssa Dawson; Mileena Kane; Miss Lollipop; Molly Brooke; Molly Stewart; MissFeedMe; NYCgirl811; Nikki Elliot; NoahBensi; Reya Sunshine; Sara Mills; Scout; ShyCountryCutie; Skyler Lo; Sofie Cakes; SureCakes; Veronika Rose	Shiri Allwood; Kayleigh Coxx; Korra del Rio; Ella Hollywood; Aubrey Kate; Khloe Kay; Lena Kelly; Casey Kisses; Lianna Lawson; Chelsea Marie; **Natalie Mars**; Marissa Minx; Ryder Monroe; Chanel Santini; Daisy Taylor

General References:

=== AVN Award [Winner] ===
Award	Winner
Best Anal Production	"First Anal 8"
Best Anal Sex Scene	Emily Willis & Ramon Nomar, "Emily Willis: The Anal Awakening"
Best Anal Series or Channel	Tushy Raw V.
Best Big Bust Production	"Bra Busters 9"
Best Big Butt Production	"Big Anal Asses 8"
Best Blowbang Scene	Angela White, "Angela White: Dark Side"
Best Cinematography	"Drive"
Best Comedy	"Love Emergency"
Best Director - Comedy	Will Ryder "Love Emergency"
Best Director - Drama	Kayden Kross "Drive"
Best Double Penetration Sex Scene	Riley Reid, Markus Dupree, and Ramon Nomar
Best Foreign Director	Alis Locanta, "Rebecca, An Indecent Story"

== Hall of Fame inductees ==
AVN on January 14, 2020, announced the 2019 inductees into its hall of fame, who were later honored with a January 22 cocktail party and then a video as the awards show opened.

- Video Branch: Bill Bailey, Angel Dark, Kianna Dior, Nicki Hunter, Jelena Jensen, Karla Lane, Sunny Lane, Marcus London, Brandi Love, L.T., Gianna Michaels, Tony Montana, Laurent Sky, Rob Spallone, Charlotte Stokely
- Executive Branch: Farrell Hirsch, Glenn King, Dave Peskin, Andy Wullmer
- Founders Branch: Rubin "Ruby" Gottesman

== 2020 AVN Adult Entertainment Expo ==
The 2020 AVN Adult Entertainment Expo was held prior to the award show from January 22 to January 25, 2020. The AVN Awards and Expo featured over 1,000 stars from the adult entertainment sector. The Expo itself contained more than 400 exhibitors at the convention. The convention featured a musical performance by rapper and songwriter T-Pain. L.A. Weekly noted it was the "largest porn industry gathering of its kind in the United States, featuring four days of events, panels and meetups, merch and memorabilia".

The convention also featured lectures on topics related to the adult film industry. Lawyer D. Gill Sperlein presented in an AVN seminar on the litigation implications related to producing pornographic content. Sperlein commented, "I think it's unlikely that there would be a conviction for obscenity." Sperlein observed regardless of legal merit, prosecutions were frequently sought against producers of adult film content, and were "done for political gain". Sperlein asserted of prosecutors of such litigation, "they don't care if they get a conviction or not." Decriminalize Sex Work organization staff member Kaytlin Bailey had a booth at the event to raise awareness to her cause; she stated the reaction to her issues was positive at the event, and discussed the stigma facing sex workers. The Free Speech Coalition and the Adult Performer Advocacy Committee handed out literature at the event supporting sex workers' rights. Sex educator and author Carol Queen attended the Expo, and presented a seminar on sex and technology impacting the industry. She commented regarding changing stigmas in society related to sex education and feminism.

== See also ==
- 2020 in film
- 2020 in television
- 92nd Academy Awards
- 72nd Primetime Emmy Awards
- 2020 British Academy Television Awards
