= Angela White =

Australian pornographic film actress (born 1984/85)

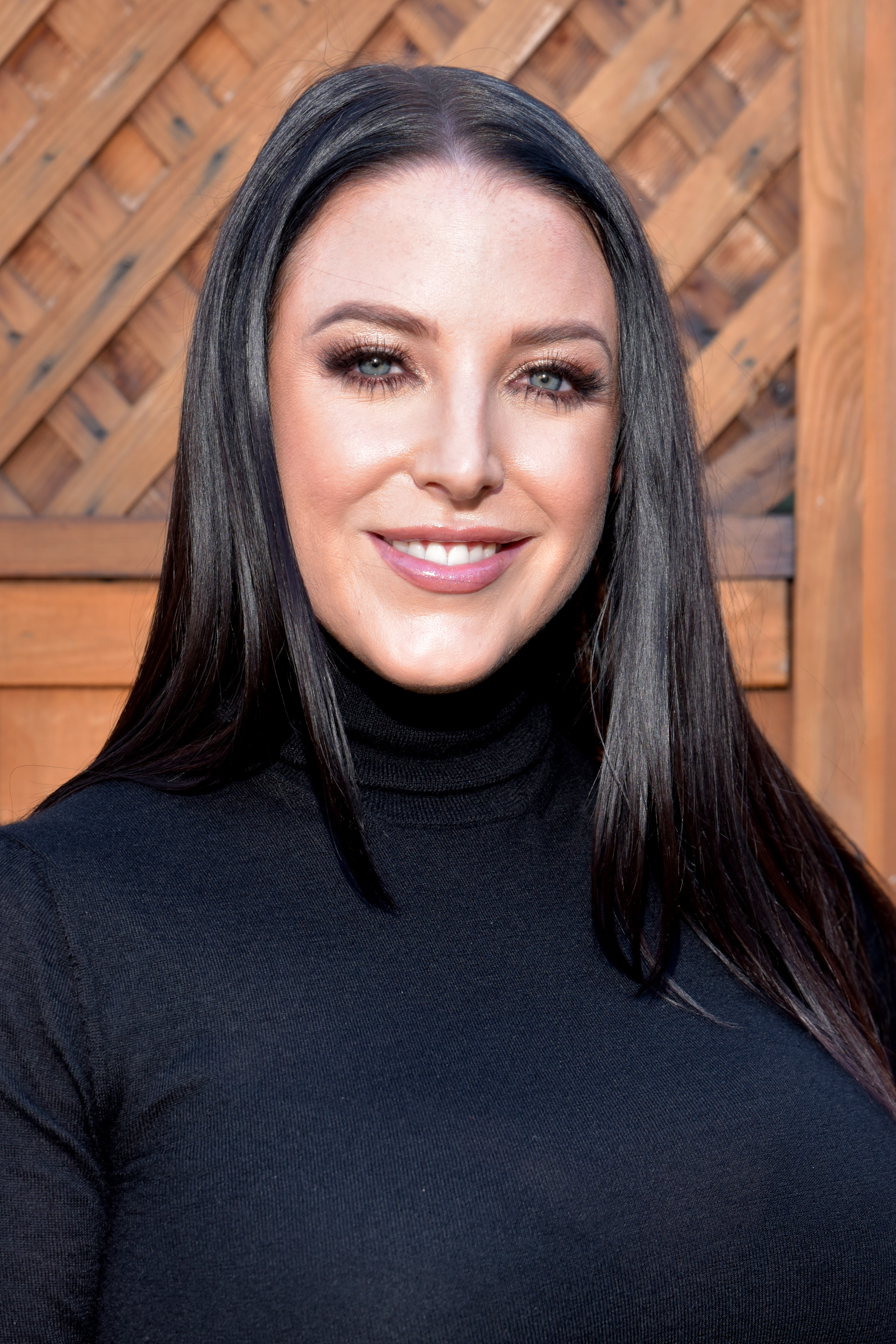
- White in 2019
- Born: Angela Gabrielle White; 1984 or 1985 (age 41–42)
- Education: University of Melbourne
- Occupations: Pornographic film actress; director
- Years active: 2003–present
- Awards: Full list

Angela Gabrielle White (born 1984 or 1985) is an Australian pornographic film actress and director. She has been inducted into the AVN Hall of Fame and the XRCO Hall of Fame, and in 2020 became AVN's first three-time Female Performer of the Year winner.

== Early life ==
White graduated from the University of Melbourne in 2010 with a first-class honours degree in gender studies. There she researched women's experiences in the Australian pornography industry. White's honours thesis, "The Porn Performer: The Radical Potential of Pleasure in Pornography", was published in The Routledge Companion to Media, Sex and Sexuality in 2017.

In 2014, she said that she would like to go back to university to complete her PhD and expand her studies to include a broader cross-section of performers.

== Career ==
White began her career in the adult industry in 2003, while still in high school. She told AVN that her first scene was shot by Score shortly after her 18th birthday. In 2007, she starred in the fifth series of the television comedy Pizza in a supporting role as the character Ruby. Her debut hardcore pornographic film was released in 2011.

XBIZ has called White "Australia's most well-known adult performer", and The Daily Beast has called her "The Meryl Streep of Porn." White has stated that she deliberately chose to use her real name in her career rather than a stage name, saying, "It was a political statement [...] I'm not ashamed of what I do". In 2013, she launched her official website, Angelawhite.com.

In October 2014, White signed a distribution deal with Girlfriends Films to release films. In the same month, Fleshlight, makers of a masturbation tool for men, named White their newest Fleshlight Girl. She is the first Australian to be named a Fleshlight Girl.

In September 2016, in an interview with XBIZ, White said she had moved to the United States and signed with Spiegler Girls to shoot for companies like Brazzers, Naughty America, and Jules Jordan.

In January 2018, White co-hosted the 35th annual AVN Awards Show in Las Vegas, Nevada, alongside comedian Aries Spears and webcam star Harli Lotts.

In October 2021, White signed an exclusive contract with Brazzers. Brazzers producer Ryan Hogan said at the time White represented "the absolute peak of professionalism and stardom in our industry. Everybody knows Angela White."

In July 2022, Brazzers released "Sexually Rated Programming", a short starring White "set in a dystopian world that sees Angela free a submissive society brainwashed by anti-erotic propaganda." The scene features a blowbang.

White has also done regular work as a webcam model.

== Awards and nominations ==
Angela White awards and nominations
Awards and nominations
Award	Wins	Nominations
AVN Awards	68	56
XRCO Awards	23	28
XBIZ Awards	11	59
NightMoves Awards	7	15
PornHub Awards	3	15

Totals (Note: Certain award groups do not simply award one winner. They acknowledge several different recipients, have runners-up, and have third place. Since this is a specific recognition and is different from losing an award, runner-up mentions are considered wins in this award tally. For simplification and to avoid errors, each award in this list has been presumed to have had a prior nomination.)
- Wins: 112
- Nominations: 173

White was inducted into the AVN Hall of Fame in 2018. White won the AVN Female Performer of the Year award in 2018 and 2019, being only the second woman to do so in two back-to-back years. In 2020, she went on to win the award for a third year in a row (as well as the AVN Award for Best Leading Actress), becoming the first person to win Female Performer of the Year in three consecutive years.

AVN Awards
Year	Film	Award	Result
2015	angelawhite.com	Best Porn Star Website	Nominated
2015	Angela	Best Star Showcase	Nominated
2015	Angela	Best Three-way Sex Scene – Girl/Girl/Boy (with Kelly Divine and Manuel Ferrara)	Nominated
2015	—N/a	Most Spectacular Boobs (Fan Voted)	Nominated
2016	Angela 2	Best All-Girl Group Sex Scene (with Alexis Texas and Anikka Albrite)	Won
2016	Angela Loves Women	Best All-Girl Movie	Won
2016	Angela 2	Best Director – Non-Feature	Nominated
2016	Angela 2	Best Double Penetration Sex Scene (with Moe Johnson, Lexington Steele and Rico Strong)	Nominated
2016	Angela 2	Best Group Sex Scene (with Mick Blue, James Deen, Erik Everhard, Mr. Pete. and John Strong)	Nominated
2016	AGW Entertainment	Best New Imprint	Nominated
2016	Angela 2	Best Oral Sex Scene	Won
2016	angelawhite.com	Best Porn Star Website	Nominated
2016	Angela 2	Best Star Showcase	Nominated
2016	—N/a	Most Spectacular Boobs (Fan Voted)	Nominated
2017	Angela Loves Women 2	Best All-Girl Movie	Nominated
2017	Angela Loves...	Best Continuing Series	Won
2017	Angela Loves Gonzo	Best Gonzo Movie	Won
2017	—N/a	Favorite Female Porn Star (Fan Voted)	Nominated
2017	Angela White Fleshlight	Most Amazing Sex Toy (Fan Voted)	Won
2017	—N/a	Most Spectacular Boobs (Fan Voted)	Nominated
2017	—N/a	Web Queen (Fan Voted)	Nominated
2018	The Altar of Aphrodite	Best Actress	Nominated
2018	Jessica Drake is Wicked	Best All-Girl Group Sex Scene (with Abella Danger, Anikka Albrite, Brandy Aniston, Jessica Drake and Vicki Chase)	Nominated
2018	Angela Loves Women 3	Best All-Girl Movie	Won
2018	Angela Loves Anal	Best Anal Sex Scene (with Markus Dupree)	Nominated
2018	Angela 3	Best Boy/Girl Sex Scene (with Manuel Ferrara)	Won
2018	Angela 3	Best Cinematography	Nominated
2018	Angela Loves...	Best Continuing Series	Won
2018	Angela 3	Best Director – Non-Feature	Nominated
2018	Angela 3	Best Double-Penetration Sex Scene (with Mick Blue and Markus Dupree)	Won
2018	Angela 3	Best Editing	Won
2018	Angela 3	Best Group Sex Scene (with Mick Blue, Xander Corvus, Markus Dupree, Toni Ribas and John Strong)	Won
2018	Angela 3	Best Marketing Campaign – Individual Project	Nominated
2018	Angela 3	Best Solo/Tease Performance	Won
2018	Angela 3	Best Soundtrack	Nominated
2018	Angela 3	Best Star Showcase	Won
2018	The Altar of Aphrodite	Best Three-way Sex Scene – Boy/Boy/Girl (with Flash Brown and Chad White)	Nominated
2018	Angela White Is Titwoman	Best Three-way Sex Scene – Girl/Girl/Boy (with Alexis Texas and James Deen)	Nominated
2018	—N/a	Favorite Female Porn Star (Fan Voted)	Won
2018	—N/a	Favorite Porn Star Website (Fan Voted)	Won
2018	—N/a	Female Performer of the Year	Won
2018	—N/a	Hall of Fame Inductee	Won
2018	Angela White Fleshlight	Most Amazing Sex Toy (Fan Voted)	Won
2018	—N/a	Most Spectacular Boobs (Fan Voted)	Won
2019	Games We Play	Best Actress – Featurette	Won
2019	Angela Loves Women 4	Best All-Girl Movie	Won
2019	I Am Angela	Best Anal Sex Scene (with Rocco Siffredi)	Won
2019	Sexual Encounters Vol. 2	Best Boy/Girl Sex Scene (with Markus Dupree)	Nominated
2019	Angela Loves Women 4	Best Cinematography	Nominated
2019	Angela by Darkko	Best Director – Non-Feature	Nominated
2019	Angela Loves Anal 2	Best Double-Penetration Sex Scene (with Mick Blue and Markus Dupree)	Nominated
2019	Angela by Darkko	Best Group Sex Scene (with Mick Blue, Markus Dupree, Steve Holmes, Mr. Pete and John Strong)	Nominated
2019	After Dark	Best Group Sex Scene (with Mick Blue, Tori Black, Vicki Chase, Abella Danger, Ryan Driller, Ricky Johnson, Alex Jones, Mia Malkova, Kira Noir and Jessa Rhodes)	Won
2019	Angela by Darkko	Best Marketing Campaign – Individual Project	Nominated
2019	Angela by Darkko	Best Oral Sex Scene	Won
2019	Angela by Darkko	Best Solo/Tease Performance	Nominated
2019	Angela by Darkko	Best Soundtrack	Nominated
2019	I Am Angela	Best Star Showcase	Won
2019	The Corruption of Kissa Sins	Best Three-way Sex Scene – Girl/Girl/Boy (with Kissa Sins and Markus Dupree)	Won
2019	I Am Angela	Best Transsexual Sex Scene (with Chanel Santini)	Nominated
2019	—N/a	Favorite Female Porn Star (Fan Voted)	Won
2019	—N/a	Female Performer of the Year	Won
2019	Angela by Darkko	Most Outrageous Sex Scene (with Markus Dupree)	Nominated
2019	—N/a	Most Spectacular Boobs (Fan Voted)	Won
2020	I Am Riley	Best All-Girl Group Sex Scene (with Riley Reid and Katrina Jade)	Won
2020	Angela Loves Women 5	Best Anthology Production	Nominated
2020	Angela White: Dark Side	Best Blowbang Scene	Won
2020	Angela White: Dark Side	Best Boy/Girl Sex Scene (with Mick Blue)	Nominated
2020	Angela Loves Women 5	Best Cinematography	Nominated
2020	Angela Loves Women 5	Best Director – Gonzo/Anthology Production	Nominated
2020	Angela White: Dark Side	Best Gangbang Scene (with Mick Blue, Markus Dupree, Robby Echo, Steve Holmes, Eddie Jaye, Eric John, Jon Jon, Mr. Pete, Rob Piper, John Strong and Prince Yahshua)	Won
2020	Perspective	Best Group Sex Scene (with Gianna Dior, Seth Gamble, Alina Lopez, Abigail Mac, Isiah Maxwell, Derrick Pierce, Michael Vegas and Whitney Wright)	Nominated
2020	Drive	Best Group Sex Scene (with Autumn Falls, Manuel Ferrara, Alina Lopez and Lena Paul)	Won
2020	Perspective	Best Leading Actress	Won
2020	Angela White: Dark Side	Best Solo/Tease Performance	Won
2020	Angela White: Dark Side	Best Star Showcase	Won
2020	2 Broke Girls: A XXX Parody	Best Virtual Reality Sex Scene (with Emma Hix)	Nominated
2020	—N/a	Favorite Female Porn Star (Fan Voted)	Won
2020	—N/a	Female Performer of the Year	Won
2020	—N/a	Most Spectacular Boobs (Fan Voted)	Won
2020	—N/a	Social Media Star (Fan Voted)	Won
2021	Seasons	Best Actress – Featurette	Won
2021	Strings Attached	Best All-Girl Group Sex Scene (with Serena Blair and Scarlett Sage)	Nominated
2021	Exposure	Best Double-Penetration Sex Scene (with Mick Blue and Ramon Nomar)	Nominated
2021	Climax	Best Group Sex Scene (with Britney Amber, Ryan Driller, Seth Gamble, Avi Love, Eric Masterson, Codey Steele, India Summer, Jane Wilde and Whitney Wright)	Won
2021	Fertile	Best Non-Sex Performance	Won
2021	swallowed.com	Best Oral Sex Scene	Nominated
2021	—N/a	Favorite Female Porn Star (Fan Voted)	Won
2021	—N/a	Female Performer of the Year	Nominated
2021	—N/a	Most Spectacular Boobs (Fan Voted)	Won
2021	—N/a	Social Media Star (Fan Voted)	Won
2022	Angela Loves Anal 3	Best Anal Movie or Limited Series	Won
2022	Angela Loves Threesomes 3	Best Directing – Non-Narrative Production	Nominated
2022	Angela Loves Anal 3	Best Double-Penetration Sex Scene (with Michael Stefano and John Strong)	Won
2022	Eat Me	Best Foursome/Orgy Sex Scene (with Mick Blue, Mona Azar and Kendra Sunderland)	Nominated
2022	Anal Savages 7	Best Gangbang Scene (with Mick Blue, Jules Jordan and Zac Wild)	Nominated
2022	Angela Loves Threesomes 3	Best Group Sex Movie or Limited Series	Won
2022	POV BJ + Sloppy Tit Fuck	Best Oral Sex Scene (with Jonni Darkko)	Nominated
2022	Angela Loves Threesomes 3	Best Solo/Tease Performance (with Gabbie Carter)	Won
2022	In Bed With the Ex	Best Trans One-on-One Sex Scene (with Emma Rose)	Nominated
2022	—N/a	Favorite Female Porn Star (Fan Voted)	Won
2022	—N/a	Female Performer of the Year	Nominated
2022	—N/a	Most Spectacular Boobs (Fan Voted)	Won
2022	—N/a	Social Media Star (Fan Voted)	Won
2023	Florentine Part 1 / If It Feels Good 3	Best Anal Sex Scene (with Manuel Ferrara)	Won
2023	Sexually Rated Programming: Blowbang	Best Blowbang Scene	Won
2023	Sex Without Love / Poetics for Tramps	Best Foursome/Orgy Scene (with Kenzie Anne, Maitland Ward, Morgan Lee, Kenna James, September Reign, Lacey London, Jessie Saint, Jada Kai, Oliver Flynn, Mazee the Goat, Manuel Ferrara & Mick Blue)	Nominated
2023	Take Control	Best Gangbang Scene (with Mick Blue, John Strong, Isiah Maxwell, Zac Wild & Oliver Flynn)	Won
2023	Welcome to White's Ward – Part 3	Best POV Sex Scene (with Xander Corvus)	Nominated
2023	Take Control	Best Solo/Tease Performance	Won
2023	—N/a	Female Performer of the Year	Nominated

XBIZ Awards
Year	Film	Award	Result
2015	angelawhite.com	Adult Site of the Year – Performer	Won
2015	Angela	All-Sex Release of the Year	Nominated
2016	angelawhite.com	Adult Site of the Year – Performer	Won
2016	Angela Loves Women	All-Girl Release of the Year – Non-Feature	Nominated
2016	Angela	All-Sex Series of the Year	Won
2016	AGW Entertainment	Best New Studio	Nominated
2016	Angela Loves Women	Best Sex Scene – All-Girl Release (with Celeste Star)	Nominated
2016	Angela 2	Best Sex Scene – All-Sex Release (with Mick Blue, James Deen, Erik Everhard, Mr. Pete and John Strong)	Nominated
2016	—N/a	Foreign Female Performer of the Year	Won
2016	Angela Loves Men	Gonzo Release of the Year	Nominated
2016	Angela 2	Performer Showcase of the Year	Nominated
2017	angelawhite.com	Adult Site of the Year – Performer	Nominated
2017	Angela Loves Women 2	All-Girl Release of the Year – Non-Feature	Nominated
2017	Angela Loves Men 2	Best Sex Scene – Gonzo Release (with )	Nominated
2017	Angela Loves Men 2	Director of the Year – Non-Feature	Nominated
2017	—N/a	Foreign Female Performer of the Year	Nominated
2017	AGW Entertainment	Foreign Studio of the Year	Nominated
2017	Angela Loves Men 2	Gonzo Release of the Year	Nominated
2017	Angela Loves...	Gonzo Series of the Year	Won
2018	Angela Loves Women 3	All-Girl Release of the Year – Non-Feature	Won
2018	The Altar of Aphrodite	Best Actress – Feature	Nominated
2018	Angela Loves Women 3	Best Sex Scene – All-Girl Release (with )	Nominated
2018	Angela Loves Threesomes 2	Best Sex Scene – Gonzo Release (with Manuel Ferrara and Karlee Grey)	Nominated
2018	Stags and Vixens	Best Sex Scene – Vignette Release (with )	Nominated
2018	—N/a	Female Performer of the Year	Nominated
2018	Angela Loves Anal	Gonzo Release of the Year	Nominated
2018	Angela Loves...	Gonzo Series of the Year	Won
2018	Angela White	Marketing Campaign of the Year	Nominated
2018	angelawhite.com	Performer Site of the Year	Nominated
2018	AGW Entertainment	Studio of the Year	Nominated
2019	Angela Loves Women 4	All-Girl Release of the Year – Non-Feature	Nominated
2019	The Weight of Infidelity	Best Actress – Couples-Themed Release	Nominated
2019	Bounce 2	Best Sex Scene – Gonzo Release (with Manuel Ferrara)	Nominated
2019	Games We Play	Best Sex Scene – Vignette Release (with Markus Dupree)	Nominated
2019	Boss Lady 2	Best Sex Scene – Vignette Release (with )	Nominated
2019	New Year's Lay	Best Sex Scene – Virtual Reality (with )	Nominated
2019	—N/a	Female Performer of the Year	Nominated
2019	Angela by Darkko	Performer Showcase of the Year	Nominated
2019	I Am Angela	Performer Showcase of the Year	Nominated
2020	Angela Loves Anal 2	Gonzo Release of the Year	Won
2020	Dark Side	Performer Showcase of the Year	Nominated
2020	Angela Loves Women 5	All-Girl Non-Feature Release of the Year	Nominated
2020	—N/a	Female Performer of the Year	Won
2020	Perspective	Best Actress – Feature Movie	Nominated
2020	Perspective	Best Sex Scene – Feature Movie (with Seth Gamble)	Nominated
2020	Drive	Best Sex Scene – Feature Movie (with Autumn Falls, Joanna Angel, Lena Paul & Manuel Ferrara)	Nominated
2020	Angela Loves Anal 2	Best Sex Scene – Gonzo (with Markus Dupree)	Nominated
2020	Girlcore: Private School	Best Sex Scene – All-Girl (with Aidra Fox, Emily Willis & Georgia Jones)	Nominated
2020	I Am Riley	Best Sex Scene – All-Girl (with Katrina Jade & Riley Reid)	Nominated
2021	—N/a	Female Performer of the Year	Nominated
2021	—N/a	Premium Social Media Star of the Year	Nominated
2021	Exposure	Best Acting – Lead	Nominated
2021	Climax	Best Sex Scene – Erotic-Themed (with Avi Love, Britney Amber, Jane Wilde, India Summer, Whitney Wright, Seth Gamble, Ryan Driller, Cody Steele & Eric Masterson)	Nominated
2021	Evil Curves	Best Sex Scene – Gonzo (with Chris Diamond)	Nominated
2021	A for Anal	Best Sex Scene – Gonzo (with Markus Dupree)	Nominated
2021	Lesbian Revenge Vol. 3	Best Sex Scene – All-Girl (with Scarlett Sage & Serena Blair)	Nominated
2021	Keeping Promises	Best Sex Scene – Virtual Reality (with Gabbie Carter)	Nominated
2022	—N/a	Female Performer of the Year	Nominated
2022	—N/a	Premium Social Media Star of the Year	Won
2022	Anal Savages 7	Best Sex Scene – Gonzo (with Mick Blue, Jules Jordan and Zac Wild)	Nominated
2022	Angela Loves Anal 3	Best Sex Scene – Gonzo (with Rob Piper and Jax Slayher)	Nominated
2022	Ultimate Fuck Toy: Gabbie Carter	Best Sex Scene – Performer Showcase (with Gabbie Carter and Michael Stefano)	Nominated
2022	Angela Loves Anal 3	Gonzo Movie of the Year	Nominated
2022	Angela Loves Threesomes 3	Gonzo Movie of the Year	Nominated
2022	Angela Loves ...	Gonzo Series of the Year	Nominated

XRCO Awards
Year	Film	Award	Result
2016	Angela 2	Best Gonzo Movie	Won
2016	Angela Loves ...	Best Gonzo Series	Nominated
2016	—N/a	Orgasmic Oralist	Nominated
2016	—N/a	Superslut	Nominated
2017	Angela Loves Women	Best Girl/Girl Series	Won
2017	Angela Loves Gonzo	Best Gonzo Movie	Nominated
2017	Angela Loves ...	Best Gonzo Series	Won
2017	angelawhite.com	Best High-End Website	Nominated
2017	—N/a	Female Performer of the Year	Nominated
2017	—N/a	Orgasmic Oralist	Nominated
2018	—N/a	Best Actress	Nominated
2018	Angela Loves Women	Best Girl/Girl Series	Nominated
2018	Angela 3	Best Gonzo Movie	Won
2018	Angela Loves ...	Best Gonzo Series	Won
2018	angelawhite.com	Best High-End Website	Nominated
2018	—N/a	Female Performer of the Year	Won
2018	—N/a	Orgasmic Analist	Nominated
2018	—N/a	Superslut	Nominated
2019	—N/a	Awesome Analist	Nominated
2019	Who's Becky	Best Actress	Nominated
2019	Angela Loves Anal	Best Anal Series	Nominated
2019	Angela Loves Women	Best Girl/Girl Series	Won
2019	Angela Loves Anal 2	Best Gonzo Release	Won
2019	Angela by Darkko	Best Release	Nominated
2019	—N/a	Female Performer of the Year	Won
2019	—N/a	Orgasmic Oralist	Nominated
2019	I Am Angela	Star Showcase	Won
2019	—N/a	Superslut	Nominated
2020	—N/a	Awesome Analist	Nominated
2020	Perspective	Best Actress	Won
2020	Angela Loves Women	Best Girl/Girl Series	Won
2020	Angela White: Dark Side	Best Gonzo Movie	Won
2020	Angela White: Dark Side	Best Release	Nominated
2020	—N/a	Female Performer of the Year	Won
2020	—N/a	Hall of Fame Inductee	Won
2020	—N/a	Orgasmic Oralist	Nominated
2020	Angela White: Dark Side	Star Showcase	Won
2020	Angela Loves Women 5	Star Showcase	Nominated
2020	—N/a	Superslut	Won
2021	—N/a	Awesome Analist	Won
2021	Seasons	Best Actress	Nominated
2021	—N/a	Female Performer of the Year	Nominated
2021	—N/a	Personal Favorite	Won
2021	—N/a	Superslut	Nominated
2022
2022	Angela Loves Threesomes	Best Gonzo Movie	Won
2022	Angela Loves Anal	Best Anal Series	Won
2022	—N/a	Female Performer of the Year	Nominated
2022	—N/a	Personal Favorite	Won
2022	—N/a	Superslut	Nominated
2022	—N/a	The Vicki Chase Orgasmic Oralist Award	Won
2022	—N/a	Awesome Analist	Nominated
2023
2023	—N/a	Female Performer of the Year	Nominated
2023	—N/a	Superslut	Nominated
2023	—N/a	Awesome Analist	Won (tied with Vicki Chase)

== Appearances in other media ==
Year	Title	Notes
2007	Fat Pizza	As Ruby
2013	The Feed	
2013	The Vagina Diaries	Documentary about labiaplasty
2015	The Porn Identity	
2019	Mrs. Fletcher	A clip of White was featured
2022	Abbie Chats	Pilot episode

== Political activities ==
In 2010, White ran as a political candidate for the Australian Sex Party in the 2010 Victorian state election, winning 2.9 percent of the vote. White ran to advocate for sex workers' rights, specifically to oppose Australian Green Party candidate Kathleen Maltzahn, who advocated banning brothels. She told BuzzFeed, "My angle wasn't necessarily to win. I wanted to make sure that [Maltzahn] didn't win". During the election, White sent copies of her DVDs to state attorney general Rob Hulls in her bid to reduce regulations for X18+ films.

In 2013, White and fellow Australian Sex Party candidate Zahra Stardust became the first political candidates to film a pornographic scene together.

== Filmography ==
Year	Title	Notes
2014	Angela	
2015	Angela Loves Women	
2015	Angela Loves Men	
2015	Angela Loves Threesomes	
2015	Angela 2	
2016	Angela Loves Gonzo	
2016	Angela Loves Women 2	
2016	Angela Loves Men 2	
2017	Angela Loves Women 3	
2017	Angela Loves Threesomes 2	
2017	Angela Loves Anal	
2017	Angela 3	
2017	Angela White Is Titwoman	with Elegant Angel
2018	Angela Loves Women 4	
2018	Angela Loves Anal 2	
2018	Angela by Darkko	with Evil Angel
2018	I Am Angela	with Evil Angel
2019	Angela Loves Women 5	
2019	Angela White: Dark Side	with Jules Jordan
2019	Drive	with Deeper
2019	Perspective	with Adult Time
2021	Angela Loves Threesomes 3	
2021	Angela Loves Anal 3	

== Publications ==
- "The Porn Performer" (2017). In Smith, Clarissa; Attwood, Feona; McNair, Brian (eds.). The Routledge Companion to Media, Sex and Sexuality. London: Routledge. pp. 394–404. doi:10.4324/9781315168302-38. ISBN 978-1-3516-8555-9.
