= 69th parallel =

69th parallel may refer to:

- 69th parallel north, a circle of latitude in the Northern Hemisphere
- 69th parallel south, a circle of latitude in the Southern Hemisphere
- 69th parallel, a pornographic film starring Kyle Stone
