= Vendetta (2017 film) =

2017 American pornographic film by Stormy Daniels

- Directed by: Stormy Daniels
- Story by: Stormy Daniels
- Starring: Stormy Daniels; Asa Akira; Kleio Valentien; Veronica Hart; Kyle Stone
- Production company: Wicked Pictures
- Release date: April 12, 2017
- Running time: 95 min
- Country: United States
- Language: English

Vendetta is a 2017 pornographic film written and directed by Stormy Daniels. The film released which was released on April 12, 2017 and distributed by Wicked Pictures.

The film which was written, directed and starred in by Stormy Daniels and saw massive attention due to the Stormy Daniels–Donald Trump scandal. After the film was announced by Wicked Pictures in March 2017 and its release in April 2017 sales struggled. Until a year later in April 2018 due to the scandal DVD and digital download sales skyrocketed. DVD sales number are not known however Wicked Pictures released the digital download numbers were over 65,000. Daniels' scene alone saw over 20,000 downloads.

== Synopsis ==
After an accident leaves Celeste's wealthy husband paralyzed, she must find other ways to keep herself satisfied. Soon he begins to suspect her infidelity and hires a private investigator. With his suspicions confirmed, Celeste soon finds herself in danger. But she is not one to back down. Her husband discovers his sweet wife is really a woman with a vendetta.

=== Scene breakdown ===
Scene 1: Asa Akira, Kleio Valentien, Stormy Daniels – lesbian three-way; 16 minutes

Scene 2: Kenzie Taylor, Lucas Frost – blowjob, vaginal, cumshot facial; 12 minutes

Scene 3: Stormy Daniels, Brendon Miller – blowjob, vaginal, anal, cumshot facial; 18 minutes

Scene 4: Asa Akira, Marcus London – blowjob and cumshot facial; 24 minutes

Scene 5: Kimber Woods, Michael Vegas – blowjob, vaginal, cumshot; 19 minutes

== Cast ==
- Stormy Daniels as Celeste
- Asa Akira as Christy
- Kleio Valentien as Billie
- Veronica Hart as Mary Ann Blanchard
- Kyle Stone as James Martin
- Brandon Miller as Stable boy
- Kenzie Taylor as the Lawyer
- Kimber Woods as Darryl's Girlfriend
- Lucas Frost as Peterson
- Marcus London as Ted
- Michael Vegas as Darryl

== Reception ==
The release saw mostly positive reviews from critics. Adult DVD Talk reviewed the film saying: "This had a surprise ending that was executed nicely. As for the sexual escapades, it was a fun release and I think Kimber Woods is going to be a superstar! Asa Akira is always incredible and Stormy does a great job with the anal. I only wish the lighting had been better in the opening scene. Decent couples release!"

XCritic said "This film is well thought out and creative. I can imagine Stormy Daniels developing this script and putting her "Stormy" spin on it to always have the viewers wondering what she is up to. She never gives too much too soon. There are very good acting performances by Stormy, Asa Akira, and Kyle Stone. The sex is pretty hot and passionate. It was nice to see Stormy ride her horse and jump over the obstacle since horses and equestrian are a big love in her life. I highly recommend Vendetta."

=== Awards ===
Year	Ceremony	Award	Nominee(s)	Result
2018	35th AVN Awards	Best Action/Thriller	—N/a	Nominated
2018	35th AVN Awards	Best All-Girl Group Sex Scene	Asa Akira, Stormy Daniels & Kleio Valentien	Nominated
2018	35th AVN Awards	Best Screenplay	—N/a	Nominated
2018	35th AVN Awards	Best Non-Sex Performance	Dick Chibbles	Nominated
2018	Spank Bank Awards	Best Sex Scene	Asa Akira, Stormy Daniels & Kleio Valentien	Won
2018	Spank Bank Awards	Best Feature Film	—N/a	Nominated
