= I Am Angela =

- Directed by: Evil Chris
- Produced by: John Stagliano
- Starring: Angela White; Rocco Siffredi; Mick Blue; Asa Akira; Joanna Angel; Markus Dupree
- Production company: Evil Angel
- Release date: October 31, 2018
- Running time: 259 minutes
- Country: United States
- Language: English

I Am Angela is an adult documentary film on the career of Angela White, released on October 31, 2018.

== Summary ==
"I Am Angela" is a documentary film on AVN Award for Female Performer of the Year Angela White. Jonni Darkko films Angela in a 3-on-1 scene with Mick Blue, Markus Dupree, and Steve Holmes, featuring double anal and triple penetration. Dana Vespoli directs and performs in an all-girl anal threesome with Angela and alt-porn Joanna Angel. In collaboration, Joey Silvera directs Angela's first TS scene with trans star Chanel Santini. Evil Angel founder and porn pioneer John Stagliano documents Angela's first experience with Rocco Siffredi.

== Reception ==
=== Critical response ===
The film has received positive reviews from industry critics. XCritic writer J.W. Sharp said "Watching ‘I Am Angela’ you get the sense that here is a woman conquering the field of porn... a woman who works tirelessly at her craft. A perfectionist who puts her fans first by delivering the very best she has and never settling for second best."

== Awards and nominations ==
Award	Category	Nominee	Result
AVN Awards	Best Star Showcase	—	Won
AVN Awards	Best Anal Sex Scene	Angela White and Rocco Siffredi	Won
AVN Awards	Best Director	Evil Chris	Won
AVN Awards	Best Editing	Evil Ricky	Won
AVN Awards	Best Marketing Campaign - Individual Project	—	Won
AVN Awards	Best Transsexual Sex Scene	Angela White and Chanel Santini	Nominated
NightMoves Awards	Best Star Showcase Release	—	Nominated
XBIZ Awards	Marketing Campaign of the Year	—	Nominated
XBIZ Awards	Performer Showcase of the Year	—	Nominated
XCritic Awards	Best Director	Evil Chris	Won
XCritic Awards	Scene of the Year	Angela White and Rocco Siffredi	Won
XCritic Awards	Best Non-Feature	—	Nominated
XRCO Awards	Star Showcase	Angela White	Won
