= Perspective (2019 film) =

- Cast and crew of "Perspective" movie Sept. 2019
- Directed by: Bree Mills
- Screenplay by: Bree Mills
- Starring: Angela White; Seth Gamble; Alina Lopez; Abigail Mac; Isiah Maxwell
- Release date: 26 September 2019
- Running time: 97 min (R-rated film); 220 min (uncut adult film)
- Language: English
- Budget: $100,000

Perspective is an adult romance drama directed by Bree Mills. The film was edited into two versions an R-rated film available for digital download, stream or DVD purchase, as well as an uncut pornography style film available for digital and hard copy purchase. The film was praised by those in the adult and mainstream market.

The film received dozens of nominations from major award associations such as AVN, XBIZ and XRCO.

== Plot ==
Daniel and Jennifer are a young married couple with different wants and needs emotionally, professionally as well as sexually. Daniel and Jennifer explore these needs behind each other's back. The struggle of the two main characters ambitions get the best of them as they get competitive to stay together.

== Cast ==
- Angela White as Jennifer
- Seth Gamble as Daniel
- Michael Vegas as Dr. Mercer
- Whitney White as Girl #1
- Abigail Mac as Girl #2
- Gianna Dior as Girl #3
- Derrick Pierce as Aaron
- Eric Masterson as Guy #1
- JJ Graves as Guy #2
- Isiah Maxwell as Guy #3

== Reception ==
Perspective has received rave reviews from critics. Porn critics rated the film as the best of 2019 and one of the best of the decade.

The film was nominated for over a dozen industry awards winning a handful. The film was nominated for six AVN Awards and won a show best three awards at the 37th AVN Awards show. It also won an award at the XBIZ Awards and was nominated for ten more.

== Awards and nominations ==
Perspective awards and nominations
Awards and nominations
Award	Wins	Nominations

Totals (Note: Certain award groups do not simply award one winner. They acknowledge several different recipients, have runners-up, and have third place. Since this is a specific recognition and is different from losing an award, runner-up mentions are considered wins in this award tally. For simplification and to avoid errors, each award in this list has been presumed to have had a prior nomination.)
- Wins: 4
- Nominations: 16

Awards and nominations received by Perspective
Year	Ceremony	Award	Nominee	Result
2020	AVN Awards	Best Actress	Angela White	Won
2020	AVN Awards	Best Actor	Seth Gamble	Won
2020	AVN Awards	Best Screenplay	Bree Mills	Won
2020	AVN Awards	Best Cinematography		Nominated
2020	AVN Awards	Best Director – Dramatic Production	Bree Mills	Nominated
2020	AVN Awards	Best Drama		Nominated
2020	AVN Awards	Best Editing		Nominated
2020	AVN Awards	Best Group Sex Scene		Nominated
2020	AVN Awards	Best Scenes		Nominated
2020	XBIZ Awards	Best Actor	Seth Gamble	Won
2020	XBIZ Awards	Feature Movie of the Year		Nominated
2020	XBIZ Awards	Best Actress	Angela White	Nominated
2020	XBIZ Awards	Best Supporting Actress	Abigail Mac	Nominated
2020	XBIZ Awards	Best Supporting Actor	Michael Vegas	Nominated
2020	XBIZ Awards	Best Sex Scene — Feature Movie		Nominated
2020	XBIZ Awards	Best Screenplay		Nominated
2020	XBIZ Awards	Best Cinematography		Nominated
2020	XBIZ Awards	Best Editing		Nominated
2020	XBIZ Awards	Best Art Direction		Nominated
2020	XBIZ Awards	Marketing Campaign of the Year		Nominated
