= Markus Dupree =

Russian pornographic actor (born 1988)

- Алексей Юрьевич Маетный
- Born: Aleksey Yurievich Maetny; May 31, 1988 (age 38); Leningrad, Russian SFSR, Soviet Union
- Education: St. Petersburg Institute of International Trade, Economics and Law
- Occupations: Pornographic actor; director
- Years active: 2008–present
- Height: 6 ft 2 in (188 cm)

Aleksey Yurievich Maetny (Russian: Алексей Юрьевич Маетный; born 31 May 1988) known as Markus Dupree is a Russian pornographic film actor and director.

Dupree has been nominated four times and won one time for AVN Award for Male Performer of the Year at the annual AVN Awards. Dupree was also a nominee for Foreign Male Performer of the Year at the 2016 and 2017 XBIZ Awards as well as Male Performer of the Year at the XRCO Awards.

== Early life and education ==
Aleksey Yurievich Maetny (Russian: Алексей Юрьевич Маетный) was born on May 31, 1988, in Leningrad, Russia SFSR, USSR (now Saint Petersburg, Russia). Dupree attended St. Petersburg Institute of International Trade, Economics and Law and graduated with a degree in economics and finance.

== Career ==
Dupree's adult film debut was 18 Year Old Pussy 14 with Devil's Film. Dupree was featured with fellow Russian adult performers Solne, Lara Page, Margo, Lana, Mary Rouge and Timo Hardy. In 2008 Dupree was featured in 8 films under the alias Markus. In 2009 Dupree continued working with Devil's Film starring in 17 films over the course of the year. Dupree in 2010 signed with Evil Angel and 21sextury Network. Beginning in February 2010 Dupree starred in Devil's Film University Gang Bang series. From 2010 to 2011 Dupree's work jumped dramatically to 105 films in 2011. Dupree shot with TeenCoreClub and Woodman Entertainment as well as his continued work with Devil's Film. In 2012 Dupree made his debut with Kink.com starring in 11 films. From 2012 to 2014 Dupree shot 634 films.

In 2014 Dupree began seeing industry award success. At the 31st AVN Awards Dupree was nominated for three awards; Best Sex Scene in a Foreign-Shot Production for Hose Monster 5, Best Sex Scene in a Foreign-Shot Production for his work in Cayenne Loves Rocco and Most Outrageous Sex Scene for XXX Factory.

In 2015 Dupree starred in Femmes de Footballeurs XXX a French film by Marc Dorcel. His work was nominated for an AVN Award for Best Sex Scene in a Foreign-Shot Production at the 32nd AVN Awards.

In 2017 at the 34th AVN Awards Dupree won Best Double Penetration Sex Scene for his work in Abella with Mick Blue and Abella Danger. Dupree was also nominated for AVN Award for Male Performer of the Year. Dupree also won Most Outrageous Sex Scene for his work in Holly Hendrix's Anal Experience. That same year he was nominated for Foreign Male Performer of the Year at the XBIZ Awards. In 2018 Dupree began directing films.

In 2018 Dupree won AVN Male Performer Award.

As of April 2020, Dupree has starred in 1,942 films and been nominated for over three dozen industry awards.

== Personal life ==
He was raised by his mother and grandmother, who, according to him, taught him "to treat the female sex with great respect." Lost his virginity at the age of 18. He lives in Los Angeles, and visits St. Petersburg several times a year. He enjoys skateboarding. link

== Controversies ==
Dupree has multiple times been accused of inappropriate behavior on the set and of not respecting the boundaries of his partners during the shooting of a scene; accusers include adult performers Katrina Jade and Brett Rossi and Kevin Moore, producer for Evil Angel and husband of late adult performer August Ames.

== Filmography ==
=== Film ===
Year	Film	Role	Notes
2018	I Am Angela	Himself	documentary

=== Television ===
Year	Work	Role	Notes
2018	35th AVN Awards	Himself	Television award show special
2020	37th AVN Awards	Himself	Television award show special

== Awards ==
- 2017 – AVN Award for Best Double Penetration Sex Scene
- 2018 – AVN Award for Male Performer of the Year
