= Honey Gold (actress) =

American pornographic film actress (born 1993/1994)

- Born: 1993 or 1994 (age 32–33)
- Occupation: Pornographic film actress
- Years active: 2017–present

Honey Gold (born 1993 or 1994) is an American pornographic film actress and model.

== Life and career ==
Gold stated that her adolescence was isolated, growing up homeschooled and leaving home at 19. After a series of office jobs, she eventually chose to pursue a career in adult films.

In 2018, Gold featured in the film The Visionaries Directors' Club, which was directed by Young M.A – the first mainstream artist to direct a Pornhub title. That year, Gold was referred to a mental health treatment center after a reported suicide attempt. In a November 24 post on Twitter, she posted that she needed to deal with trauma from her past, launching a GoFundMe for her treatment. She has continued to openly discuss mental health after her suicide attempt.

Gold started posting videos to OnlyFans in 2020 when pornographic film production was disrupted due to the COVID-19 pandemic.

Gold was named a Bang! ambassador in 2017. She won the 'Best New Starlet' at the 2018 XBIZ Awards. She has also won Fleshbot, Inked, Pornhub, and Urban X awards.
