= Sara Luvv =

American former pornographic film actress

- Occupation: Pornographic film actress
- Years active: 2012–2022

Sara Luvv is an American pornographic film actress.

== Career ==
In February 2016, Luvv was named Girlsway's Girl of the Month.

== Filmography ==
=== Adult films ===
Year	Title	Studio	Directors
2014	Lesbian Family Affair	-	Tanya Tate
2015	Super Cute 3	Hard X	Mason
2015	Fool for Love	Web Young	Stills by Alan
2015	Her 1st Interracial	Dark X	Mason
2015	Mother-Daughter Affair 2	Sweet Sinner/ Mile High Media	James Avalon
2015	Anal Brats	Evil Angel	Francesca Lé, Mark Wood
2015	Lesbian Adventures Older Women 8	SweetheartVideo /Mile High Media	Dana Vespoli
2016	Sharing My Husband	Digital Sin	Eddie Powell, Paul Woodcrest
2016	Kittens and Cougars 10	Zero Tolerance	Mike Quasar
2016	Lesbian Stepmother	SweetheartVideo /Mile High Media	Dana Vespoli
2016	Lesbian Adventures Strap-On Specialists 10	SweetheartVideo /Mile High Media	Dana Vespoli
2016	Anal Models 2	Tushy.com	Greg Lansky
2016	Trying New Things	New Sensations	Jacky St. James
2016	Weekend to Remember	Wicked Pictures	Stormy Daniels
2016	Interracial Teens	Dark X, Mile High Media	Mason
2016	Daddy & Me	Hard X	Mason
2016	Little Anal Vixxxens	Evil Angel	Francesca Lé, Mark Wood
2016	A Lesbian Romance 2	New Sensations	Jacky St. James
2016	My 1st Black Teacher	Elegant Angel	Dreadneck
2016	Burning Desires	X-Art	Brigham Field, Colette Pelissier
2016	Once You Go Black: Black Poles, Teen Holes	Metro	Zander
2016	POV Sluts Swallow Edition	Evil Angel	Toni Ribas
2016	Daddy's Little Girl	Taboo, Cal Vista, Metro	
2016	Interracial Crush	Elegant Angel	Pat Myne
2016	Tight Ass Teens	Colette	Colette Field
2016	Sex Rules	Penthouse	Hank Hoffman
2016	My Black Stepbrother	Zero Tolerance	Mike Quasar
2016	Sinning With My Sister	Pretty Dirty, Girlfriends Films	Stills by Alan
2016	Too Small for Black Cock	3rd Degree	
2016	The Pledge (All-Girl)	Web Young	Stills by Alan
2016	Missing A Lesbian Crime Story	Girlsway, Girlfriends Films	Stills by Alan, Bree Mills
2016	Missing: A Lesbian Crime Story	Girlsway, Girlfriends Films	Stills by Alan, Bree Mills
2016	Sara Desperate	BANG! Originals	Manuel Ferrara
2016	Petite Cumsluts	Kick Ass	
2016	Babysitting the Baumgartners	Adam & Eve	Kay Brandt
2016	Reunited	Wicked Pictures	Jonathan Morgan
2016	An Unexpected Encounter: Sex with a Stranger	Digital Sin	Jacky St. James
2016	Shyla Jennings Loves Girls	SweetheartVideo /Mile High Media	Dana Vespoli
2016	Interracial Family Needs	Sweet Sinner/ Mile High Media	Jacky St. James
2016	Couples Seeking Teens 21	Reality Junkies	Bobby Manila
2016	Tiny Teen Threesomes	Colette	Colette Field
2016	Love Stories 5	Erotica X	James Avalon
2016	The Faces of Alice	Girlsway, Girlfriends Films	Bree Mills, Stills by Alan
2016	Anal Euphoria	BAM Visions	Mick Blue, Claudio Bergamin
2017	Turn the Page	Wicked Pictures	Mike Quasar
2017	Adventures in Deep Throating	Anatomik Media	Howard Levine
2017	Cocks XL 7 (Cum Louder)		
2017	Adventures With the Baumgartners	Adam & Eve	Kay Brandt
2017	Little Miss Tiny Tits	BANG! Originals	Manuel Ferrara
2017	Lesbian Anal	SweetheartVideo /Mile High Media	Dana Vespoli
2017	Bound for Sex 2	Digital Sin	Paul Woodcrest
2018	Teen Facials 5	Mile High Xtreme	
2019	Men Are Slaves	Joy Media	
2024	Hot Brunettes	Dark X	Mason
2024	Sara Luvv Loves Womxn	Filly Films Smash Pictures	

== Awards and nominations ==
Year	Award	Category	Nominated work	Result	Ref(s)
2015	AVN Award	Best Lesbian Group Scene (with Anikka Albrite, Dana Dearmond, Carter Cruise, Katie Parker and Marina Angel)	Twisted Fate: A Lesbian Feature	Nominated	
2015	AVN Award	Best Threesome Scene (D/D/P) (shared with James Dean and Riley Reid)	Oil Overload 11	Nominated	
2015	XBIZ Award	Best New Starlet		Nominated	
2015	XRCO Award	Cream Dream of the Year		Nominated	
2016	AVN Award	Best Lesbian Group Scene (with Ariel X and Sasha Hart)	Seduction Diaries of a Femme	Nominated	
2016	AVN Award	Best POV Sex Scene (with Dillion Harper and Danny Mountain)	Girlfriend Experience 2	Nominated	
2016	AVN Award	Best Boy/Girl Sex Scene (with Xander Corvus)	Restraint	Nominated	
2016	AVN Award	Fan Award: Favorite Porn Star (Female)		Nominated	
2016	XBIZ Award	Female Performer of the Year		Nominated	
2016	XRCO Award	The Unsung Siren of the Year		Nominated	
2017	AVN Award	Female Performer of the Year		Nominated	
2017	AVN Award	Best Actress	Babysitting the Baumgartners	Nominated	
2017	AVN Award	Best Lesbian Scene (with Rebel Lynn)	Fool For Love	Nominated	
2017	AVN Award	Best Masturbation/Striptease Scene	Babysitting the Baumgartners	Nominated	
2017	AVN Award	Best Boy/Girl Sex Scene (with Mandingo)	Her 1st Interracial	Nominated	
2017	AVN Award	Best Threesome Scene (D/D/P) (with Anikka Albrite and Mick Blue)	Babysitting the Baumgartners	Nominated	
2017	DVDerotic Award	Female Performer of the Year		Nominated	
2017	XBIZ Award	Female Performer of the Year		Nominated	
2017	XBIZ Award	Best Actress - Lesbian Film	Lesbian Experience: An Unexpected Encounter	Nominated	
2017	XBIZ Award	Best Actress – Feature Film (shared with Anikka Albrite)	Babysitting the Baumgartners	Won	
2017	XBIZ Award	Best Sex Scene - Vignette (with Toni Ribas)	Fantasies	Nominated	
2017	XBIZ Award	Best Sex Scene – Feature Film (with Anikka Albrite and Mick Blue)	Babysitting the Baumgartners	Nominated	
2017	XBIZ Award	Best Sex Scene – Feature Film (with Mick Blue)	Babysitting the Baumgartners	Nominated	
2017	XRCO Award	Best Actress	Babysitting the Baumgartners	Won	
2018	AVN Award	Best Actress	The Faces of Alice	Won	
2018	AVN Award	Best Lesbian Group Scene (with Bree Daniels, Dahlia Sky, Darcie Dolce, Cadence Lux, Kimmy Granger, Kristen Scott, Melissa Moore, Serena Blair and AJ Applegate)	The Faces of Alice	Nominated	
2018	AVN Award	Best VR Sex Scene (with Mick Blue)	Being Mr. B: A Baumgartner Fantasy	Nominated	
2018	Fleshbot Award	Best Anal Scene (with Manuel Ferrara)	Bang Gonzo Sara Luvv In Lingerie Getting Ass Fucked And Cum On	Nominated	
2018	XBIZ Award	Best Actress - Comedy Motion Picture	The Faces of Alice	Nominated	
2018	XBIZ Award	Best Sex Scene – Comedy (shared with Bree Daniels)	The Faces of Alice	Nominated	
2018	XBIZ Award	Best Sex Scene - Girls Only (with Bree Daniels)	The Faces of Alice	Nominated	
