= August Ames =

Canadian pornographic film actress (1994–2017)

- Ames in 2014
- Born: Mercedes Grabowski; 23 August 1994; Antigonish, Nova Scotia, Canada
- Died: 5 December 2017 (aged 23); Camarillo, California, U.S.
- Cause of death: Suicide by hanging
- Occupation: Pornographic film actress
- Years active: 2013–2017
- Spouse: Kevin Moore

Mercedes Grabowski (23 August 1994 – 5 December 2017), known professionally as August Ames, was a Canadian pornographic film actress. She appeared in more than 250 films, including a non-pornographic film in 2016, and was nominated for several AVN Awards. With a self-disclosed history of sexual abuse and mental illness, Ames died by suicide in 2017 at the age of 23 after social media backlash following a tweet she posted, due to some perceiving the tweet as homophobic.

== Early life ==
Ames was born Mercedes Grabowski in Antigonish, Nova Scotia, on 23 August 1994. She grew up in Petawawa, Ontario, and later lived in Colorado Springs, Colorado. Both of her parents were in the army and she spent her early years as a military brat, including a number of years living beside Canadian Forces Base Petawawa.

Ames alleged that she was routinely sexually abused by her paternal grandfather as a child, but her father refused to believe her and she was sent to live in a group home at 12 years old. She also spoke of being enticed to strip by an adult male as a young teenager in exchange for drugs. Ames studied culinary arts for a year after graduating from Oromocto High School. Prior to her adult film career, she worked as a nanny, an animal-assisted aide, and a horseback trainer.

== Career ==
Ames's career as a pornographic film actress began at the age of 19, in 2013. She had over 100 IMDb credits, including productions by companies such as Brazzers, Elegant Angel, Evil Angel, Girlfriends Films, Jules Jordan Video, New Sensations and Sweetheart Video. She was nominated for four AVN Awards in her lifetime, including three nominations for Female Performer of the Year.

In 2016, she appeared in the non-pornographic film Model for Murder: The Centerfold Killer.

=== Awards ===
- 2014 Miss FreeOnes Best Newcomer
- 2015 AVN Award – Cutest Newcomer (Fan Award)
- 2015 XRCO Award – Cream Dream
- 2016 Twistys Treat of the Year
- 2017 AVN Award – Most Spectacular Boobs (Fan Award)
- 2017 NightMoves Award – Best Boobs (Editor's Choice)

== Personal life ==
Ames was married to Kevin Moore, a pornography producer and director for Evil Angel.

Weeks prior to her death, Ames said that she had a history of bipolar disorder and dissociative identity disorder (DID) due to her traumatic childhood, saying: "Some days I'll be fine and if I'm not doing anything I'll get these awful flashbacks of my childhood and I get very depressed and I can't get out of bed and cancel my scenes for like a week or two." She added that she found it difficult to get care for her conditions due to preconceptions about adult film industry professionals.

== Death ==
In December 2017, Ames was due to perform in a scene, but withdrew when she learned that the co-star was a man who had appeared in gay pornography. On 3 December 2017, Ames wrote on Twitter:

August Ames
(@AugustAmesxxx)
tweeted:

whichever (lady) performer is replacing me tomorrow for @EroticaXNews, you're shooting with a guy who has shot gay porn, just to let cha know. BS is all I can say🤷🏽♀️ Do agents really not care about who they're representing? #ladirect I do my homework for my body🤓✏️🔍

3 December 2017

The tweet drew criticism and abuse from social media users. Ames, who was bisexual, defended her right to exercise her sexual autonomy in a subsequent tweet. According to an article subsequently published in Rolling Stone, the tweet and its response revealed a "schism" in the porn industry between those who believed that there is a lower chance of sexually transmitted infections for women who film with men who perform exclusively with women than with men who perform with both men and women, and those who believed the standard to be flawed and homophobic.

On 5 December 2017, two days after her tweet, Ames was found dead in a park in Camarillo, California, at the age of 23. Her death was ruled a suicide due to asphyxia by hanging by the Ventura County Medical Examiner's Office. Upon her autopsy, toxicology results revealed that she had cocaine, marijuana, the antidepressant sertraline (Zoloft) and the anxiolytic alprazolam (Xanax) in her system at her time of death.

Close friends blamed cyberbullying for her suicide. Her final tweet before suicide had been the words "Fuck y'all." Some pointed to a demand by Jaxton Wheeler, a pansexual performer, that Ames apologize or take a cyanide pill. Journalist Jon Ronson later found that Wheeler's tweet could not have been seen by Ames, as it was not released until after her death. However, questions about the degree to which cyberbullying might have contributed to Ames' death lingered for many months.

Her brother and Ronson suggested that violence by Markus Dupree toward Ames during pornographic filming could have triggered traumatic memories or contributed to the suicide. She texted multiple people after filming to voice her distress over the scene, which was filmed about six weeks before her death.

Ronson, who has a history of writing about both cyberbullying and the porn industry, eventually released the investigation in a podcast series titled The Last Days of August. In the podcast, he explored the cyberbullying aspect of the story as well as multiple aspects of Ames's life including marital problems, social isolation, and her history of trauma, mental illness and substance abuse. Ronson concludes that a number of people around Ames contributed to her poor mental state that led to her death and draws comparisons between Ames's suicide and the fictional suicide of the young girl in J. B. Priestley's modern morality play An Inspector Calls (1945).

In the wake of Ames's death and those of other adult performers that year, initiatives within the industry were proposed to deal with the issue, including The August Project, a hotline conceived by Ames' widower, Kevin Moore, and Pineapple Support, a non-profit organization launched in April 2018 by British performer Leya Tanit.
