= Aries Spears =

American stand-up comedian (born 1975)

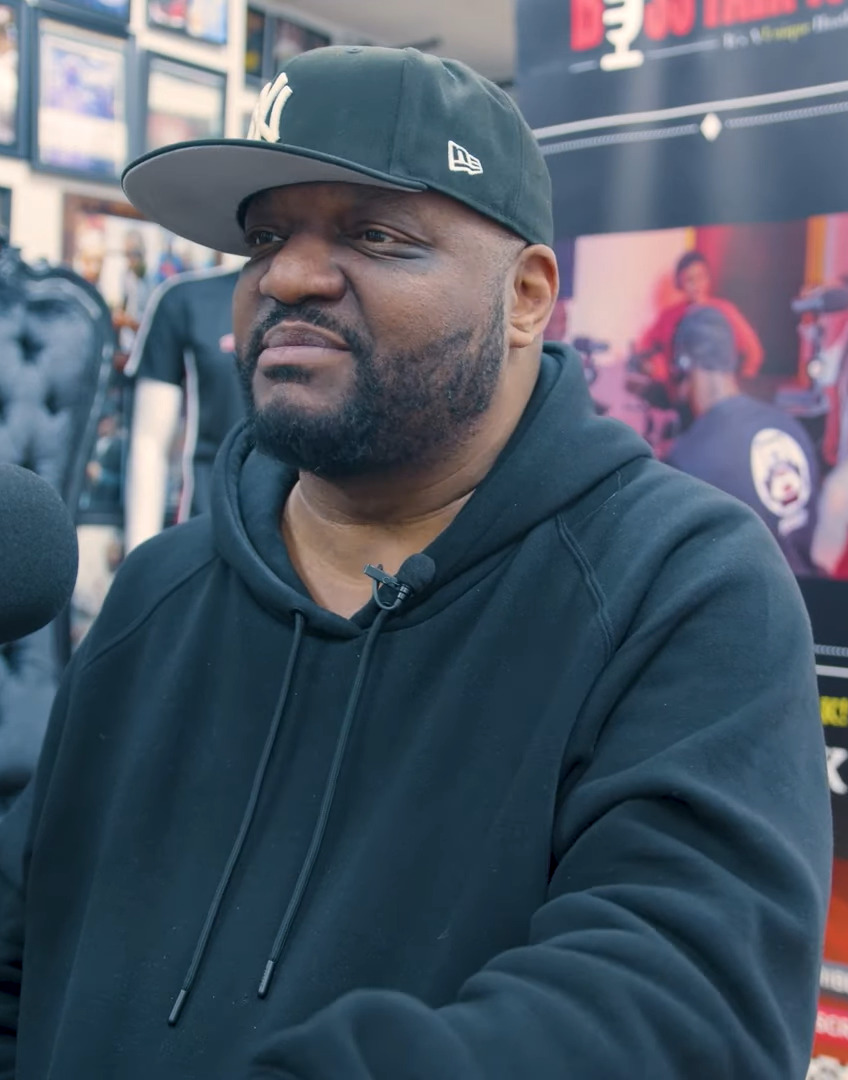
- Spears in 2025
- Born: Nairobi Aries Spears; April 3, 1975 (age 51); Chicago, Illinois, U.S.
- Children: 3

Comedy career
- Years active: 1989–present
- Medium: Stand-up, film, television
- Genre: Sketch comedy

Nairobi Aries Spears (born April 3, 1975) is an American stand-up comedian, impressionist, and actor from New Jersey. Spears was a regular on Fox's sketch comedy series Mad TV (1997–2005), appearing in 198 episodes, making him the second longest-serving cast member on the show behind Michael McDonald. In 2011, he released a special called Aries Spears: Hollywood, Look I'm Smiling. and in 2018 and 2020, he co-hosted the AVN Awards.

== Early life ==
Spears was born in Chicago, Illinois, and moved to New York when he was two years old. His mother, Doris Spears, is a jazz singer. Spears moved to New Jersey at age eleven and attended Arthur M. Judd Elementary School. He was expelled for fighting during his sophomore year in North Brunswick Township High School in North Brunswick.

Spears said in a 2016 interview that his first experience performing stand-up comedy was doing impressions of James Brown and Jack Nicholson at the "Uptown Comedy Cafe" in Harlem at about fourteen years old.

== Career ==
=== Early film and TV roles ===
Spears cites the Russell Simmons' Def Comedy Jam as his first big break in comedy. He featured in episode nine of the second season of the program in 1992, when he was sixteen years old, and returned in 1997 for episode twelve of the seventh season. He also performed on It's Showtime at the Apollo.

He moved to Los Angeles in 1992, landed a recurring role on A Different World (1993) and became a regular at The Comedy Store, The Improv and The Laugh Factory. Other television credits include Crosstown Traffic, The Adventures of Brisco County, Jr. (1993) and Soul Train.

Spears was cast in a starring role opposite Glenn Frey in South of Sunset (1993). Spears's other film appearances include Home of Angels (1994), The Pest (1997), Jerry Maguire in which he played Teepee, brother of Rod Tidwell (1996), Out-of-Sync (1995), and The Proud Family (2003).

=== MADtv ===
Spears joined the cast of MADtv during its third season in 1997 and he left at the end of its tenth season in 2005. During his tenure, Spears created characters such as comedian Belma Buttons, Walter (Crackheads), Reggie (Erascist), Dollar Bill Montgomery, The Klumps, Sisqo, Evander Holyfield, and El Diablo Negro. He also performed impressions of celebrities including Bill Cosby, Michael Jackson, Mike Tyson, Shaquille O'Neal, James Brown, Al Pacino, Eddie Murphy, Jay-Z, Kanye West, LL Cool J, DMX, Snoop Dogg, R. Kelly, Gerald Levert, Denzel Washington, Martin Lawrence, and Paul Mooney.

=== After MADtv ===
Spears appeared in a second-season episode of Mind of Mencia, which parodied Jamie Foxx's role in Kanye West's music video for "Gold Digger." He appeared in the 2006 film Hood of Horror. Spears performed in the TV series The Underground and voiced the character Wizard Kelly in the animated television series The Proud Family and its revival series The Proud Family: Louder and Prouder.

Spears appeared in two episodes of Frank Caliendo's sketch comedy show Frank TV as Shaquille O'Neal.

He appeared alongside Cedric the Entertainer and other comedians in the All Star Comedy Jam in 2009.

In 2011, Spears released a comedy special titled Aries Spears: Hollywood, Look I'm Smiling.

According to Deadline Hollywood, Spears was expected to appear alongside Franco Nero, Sherilyn Fenn, Paul Rodriguez, and Jeff DuJardin in a dark comedy feature film directed by Vlad Kozlov, titled The Immortalist, in 2020.

Spears co-hosted the AVN awards in 2018 and again in 2020.

In 2025, Spears participated in Saudi Arabia's Riyadh Comedy Festival, an event characterized by Human Rights Watch as an effort by the Saudi government to whitewash its human rights abuses.

== Sexual abuse allegation ==
On August 30, 2022, Spears and Tiffany Haddish were sued for alleged grooming and sexual abuse of two minors. The lawsuit details that the minors were recruited to film comedy skits, and were asked to perform sexually suggestive content. Spears's attorney stated "he isn't going to fall for any shakedown" in reference to Spears. That September, the accuser filed to have the claims against both dismissed with prejudice.

== Filmography ==
=== Film ===
Year	Title	Role	Notes
1994	Home of Angels	Gang Leader	
1995	Out-of-Sync	Frank	
1996	Jerry Maguire	Tee Pee Tidwell	
1997	The Pest	Chubby	
1998	Why Do Fools Fall in Love	Redd Foxx	
2001	Josie and the Pussycats	The Other Carson Daly	
2001	Higher Ed	Lil' Bud	
2003	Love Chronicles	Playa	
2003	The Night B4 Christmas	Elvin (voice)	TV movie
2004	Jiminy Glick in Lalawood	Gunnar "MC GUN" Jorge	
2005	The Proud Family Movie	Wizard Kelly/Board Member (voice)	TV movie
2006	Hood of Horror	Quon	
2006	The Boo Crew	Money/Jay-Z/Africans (voice)	TV movie
2015	Promoted	Platinum Artist	
2017	Kings	Keith	
2019	Chase	Miles	
2020	The 420 Movie: Mary & Jane	Patrolman Watkins	
2021	Immortalist	Doctor Olivier Johnson	
2024	Holy Cash	Willie Dollars	
2026	Winnie	Deion	Short
2026	Wildcards	James Jones	

=== Television ===
Year	Title	Role	Notes
1992	Def Comedy Jam	Himself	Episode: "Episode #2.9"
1993	Soul Train	Himself/Guest Host	Episode: "Episode #22.13" & "#23.3"
1993	A Different World	Ty	Episode: "Mind Your Own Business" & "Dancing Machines"
1993	South of Sunset	Ziggy Duane	Main Cast
1994	The Adventures of Brisco County, Jr.	Bobby Swan	Episode: "Stagecoach"
1996	C Bear and Jamal	Kwame/Big Chill (voice)	Main Cast
1997	Def Comedy Jam	Himself	Episode: "Episode #7.6"
1997–2005	MADtv	Himself/Cast Member	Main Cast: Season 3–10
2001	The Test	Himself/Panelist	Episode: "The Roommate Test"
2001–2003	The Proud Family	Wizard Kelly (voice)	Recurring Cast
2002	Late Friday	Himself	Episode: "Episode #2.8"
2002	The Rerun Show	Louise Jefferson	Episode: "Saved by the Bell: Jessie's Song/The Jeffersons: Florence in Love"
2003	Laffapalooza	Himself	Episode: "Laffapalooza Volume 3"
2004	ComicView	Himself	Episode: "Episode #13.2"
2005	Lilo & Stitch: The Series	Wizard Kelly (voice)	Episode: "Spats"
2005	Comedy Central Presents	Himself	Episode: "Aries Spears"
2006	The Underground	Himself/Cast Member	Main Cast
2006	Mind of Mencia	Himself/Guest Host	Episode: "Episode #2.1"
2006–2014	Comics Unleashed	Himself	Recurring Guest
2007	CSI: Miami	Oscar Monahan	Episode: "Inside Out" & "Chain Reaction"
2009	Black to the Future	Himself	Episode: "Hour 1: The 70s"
2009	Just for Laughs	Himself	Episode: "Gerry Dee"
2009–2019	Laugh Factory	Himself	Recurring Guest
2010	The Boondocks	Lord Rufus Crabmiser (voice)	Episode: "Stinkmeaner 3: The Hateocracy"
2010	Supreme Court of Comedy	Himself	Episode: "Aries Spears vs. Paul Mooney"
2012	ComicView	Himself	Episode: "Kevin Hart/Aries Spears/Omar"
2012	Black Dynamite	Mr. T/O. J. Simpson (voice)	Recurring Cast: Season 1
2013	Funny as Hell	Himself	Episode: "Episode #3.8"
2013	Who Gets the Last Laugh?	Himself	Episode: "Aries Spears/Natasha Leggero/Andy Dick"
2015	Turbo FAST	Mr. Tinfoil (voice)	Episode: Tough as Snails/C.O.N.S.P.I.R.A.C.Y.
2015	Gotham Comedy Live	Himself/Host	Episode: "Aries Spears"
2016	MADtv	Himself	Episode: "Episode #15.3"
2016	American Dad!	Shaquille O'Neal (voice)	Episode: Criss-Cross Applesauce: The Ballad of Billy Jesusworth
2016	TripTank	Various Voices (voice)	Recurring Cast: Season 2
2018	AVN Awards	Himself/Host	Main Host
2018	Family Guy	Eddie Murphy/Shaquille O'Neal (voice)	Episode: "Pal Stewie" & "Regarding Carter"
2020	AVN Awards	Himself/Host	Main Host
2020	Gentefied	Chef Michael	Episode: "Unemployed AF"
2022	Phat Tuesdays: The Era of Hip Hop Comedy	Himself	Main Guest
2022	Dark Side of Comedy	Himself	Episode: "Roseanne Barr" & "Artie Lange"
2022–2026	The Proud Family: Louder and Prouder	Wizard Kelly (voice)	Recurring Cast
2023	See It Loud: The History of Black Television	Himself	Recurring Guest

=== Comedy releases ===
Year	Title
2010	Chocolate Sundaes Comedy Show: Live on Sunset Strip!
2011	Aries Spears: Hollywood, Look I'm Smiling
2016	Aries Spears: Comedy Blueprint

=== Discography ===
Year	Title
2005	I Ain't Scared!

=== Documentary ===
Year	Title
2011	Ladies and Gentlemen, Jordan Rock
2011	Phunny Business: A Black Comedy

== See also ==
- Dave Chappelle - American stand-up comedian and actor
- Eddie Murphy - American stand-up comedian and actor
- Kevin Hart - American stand-up comedian and actor
- Richard Pryor - American stand-up comedian and actor (1940–2005)
