= Keisha Grey =

American pornographic actress

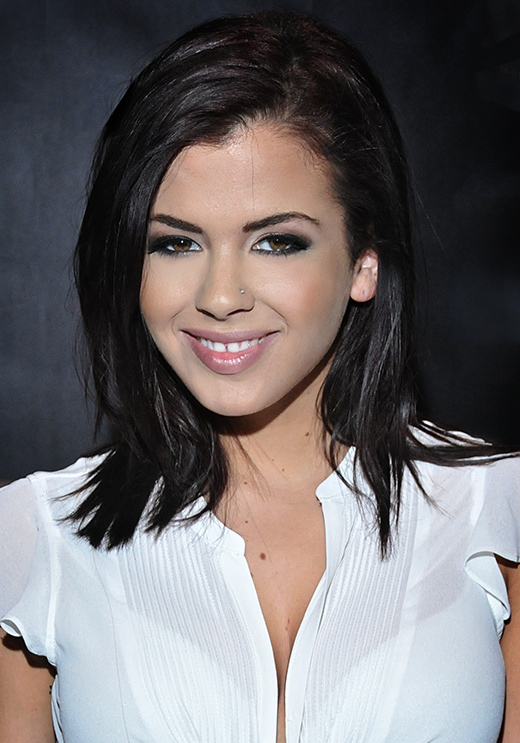
- Grey in 2015
- Born: 1994 or 1995
- Occupation: Pornographic film actress

Keisha Grey (born 1994 or 1995) is an American pornographic film actress.

== Career ==
At the age of 19, Grey moved from Tampa, Florida to Los Angeles to pursue a career in pornography, having previously worked at a café and at a pizza restaurant. Since 2013 she has appeared in numerous scenes for most of the major production companies, has twice been awarded an AVN Award and was in 2016 profiled in CNBC's "The Dirty Dozen: Porn's Biggest Stars". Grey temporarily retired from performing in 2022, but made a comeback in August 2024 with a scene for Bang Bros.

== Personal life ==
Grey's interests include playing cello and bass guitar, and skateboarding. In 2022 she retired from performing to recover from addiction and poor mental health, but eventually returned to the industry in 2024. During the hiatus she started an OnlyFans account, posting films of her everyday life such as playing cello and skateboarding, as well as adult content.
