= Whitney Wright =

American pornographic film actor and director

- Born: Oklahoma City, Oklahoma, U.S.
- Occupation: Pornographic film actress
- Years active: 2016–2026

Whitney Wright is a retired American pornographic film actress.

== Career ==
Wright was named "Best New Starlet" at the 2018 XRCO Awards. At the 2021 AVN Awards she was honored in the "Best Group Sex Scene" category and the "Best Quarantine Sex" Scene category.

== Awards ==
- 2018: XRCO Award as New Starlet
- 2021: AVN Award for Best Quarantine Sex Scene for "Teenage Lesbian: One Year Later" (together with Kristen Scott, Alina Lopez, Aidra Fox, Kenna James, Kendra Spade)
- 2021: AVN Award for Best Group Sex Scene for "Climax" (along with Angela White, Britney Amber, India Summer, Jane Wilde, Avi Love, Seth Gamble, Codey Steele, Ryan Driller, Eric Masterson)

== Political views ==
During the Gaza war, Wright came out in support of the Palestinians.

=== Travel to Iran ===
On February 5, 2024, Wright posted to Instagram images from a recent trip she took to Iran. She had originally included in her post that her trip was "not an endorsement of the government" of Iran, but she later deleted that comment. Her visit included a tour of the building which formerly housed the US Embassy in Tehran, and has been converted into an anti-American museum.

Iranian actress Setareh Pesyani condemned the government of Iran for allowing Wright into the country, as pornography is illegal in Iran, and could have put Wright at risk for the death penalty. However, the Islamic Revolutionary Guard Corps denied having known of Wright's involvement in pornography at the time that her travel visa was issued.

Wright's visit was condemned by Iranian-American journalist Masih Alinejad who wrote on Twitter that "the women of Iran want to be like Rosa Parks and not Whitney Wright".

Wright also visited Afghanistan in 2025.

== See also ==
- List of pornographic performers by decade
