= Karlee Grey =

American content creator and pornographic film actress

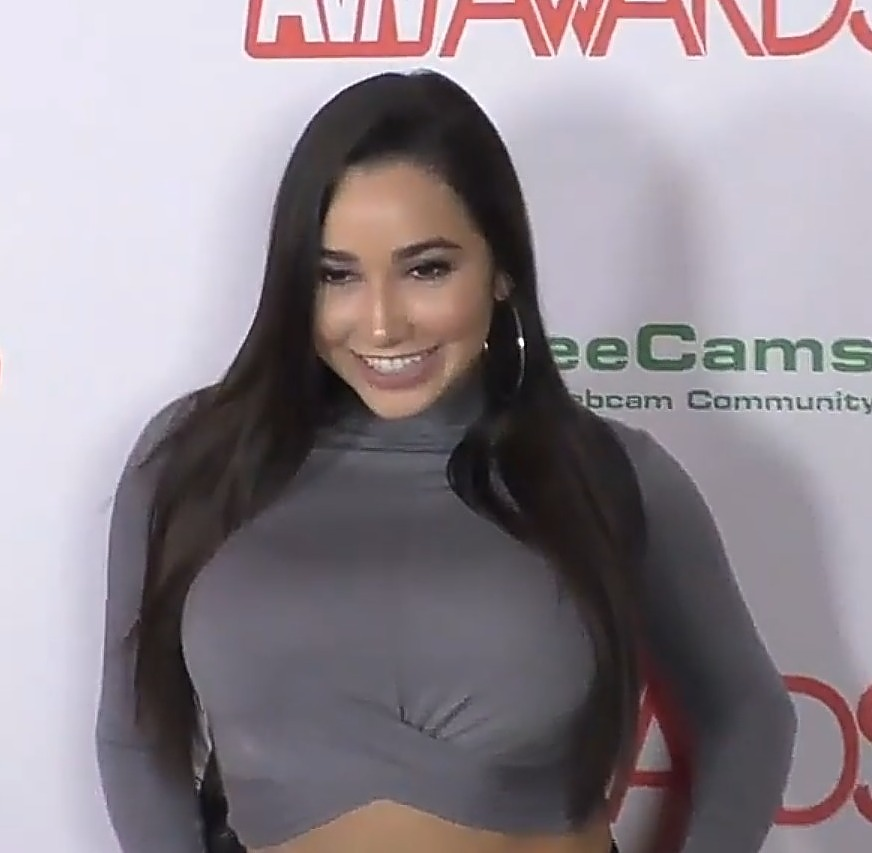
- Grey at the 34th AVN Awards in Hollywood, Los Angeles, 2016
- Born: 1993 or 1994 (age 32–33)
- Occupations: Pornographic film actress; OnlyFans creator
- Years active: 2014–present

Karlee Grey (born 1993 or 1994) is an American OnlyFans creator and former pornographic film actress.

== Career ==
Grey entered the adult film industry in 2014. Throughout her decade within the industry, she won multiple monthly awards, including Vixen Angel of the Month in May 2018, and Cherry Pimps' 'Cherry of the Month' for February 2017. It was around this time she also joined Mark Spiegler's talent agency.

During her career, she was also noted as an example of one of the most-searched adult film actresses by users from Brazil, marking a rise of popularity of adult films within the nation.

Grey joined OnlyFans in 2019, with her account being partially managed by her fiancé.

Throughout her career in adult films, she was nominated for a series of awards, including XRCO Awards in 2016 and 2022, as well as XBIZ Awards in 2018 and 2024. She was nominated for AVN Awards for three consecutive years (2016–2018).

She has also participated in charitable events within the adult film industry, such as an April 2020 fundraiser for the Cult for Good Project, which sought to provide COVID-19 testing and essentials to homeless people during the pandemic.

== Personal life ==
Grey became engaged around 2017, and stated that she has only done solo or lesbian content on OnlyFans due to her own personal preferences and feelings of safety. As of 2023, she lived in California.

She is bisexual.
