= Brett Rossi =

American pornographic film actress (born 1988/1989)

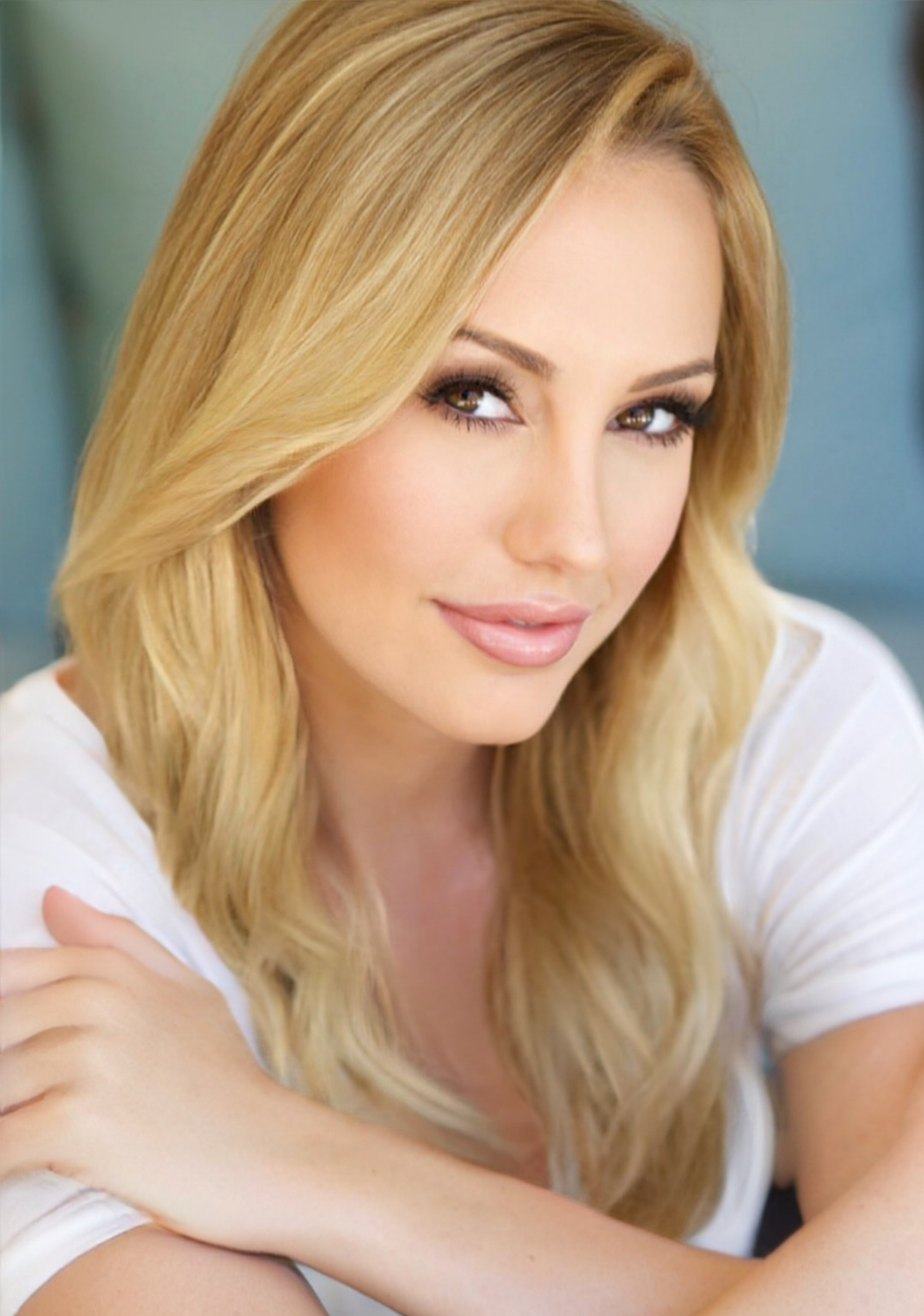
- Rossi in 2025
- Born: 1988 or 1989 (age 36–37); Fontana, California, U.S.
- Other names: Scottine Ross; Scottine Sheen
- Occupations: Model; dancer; pornographic film actress
- Years active: 2010–present
- Spouse: Jonathan Ross (m. 2011; div. 2013)
- Partner: Charlie Sheen (2013–2014)
- Website: brettrossi.com

Scottine Ross (born 1988 or 1989), known professionally as Brett Rossi, is an American model, entertainer, dancer and former pornographic film actress.

== Career ==
In 2012, Rossi was signed by the pornographic film company Twistys and named the February Penthouse Pet.

After a several year hiatus in the industry, Rossi appeared on Vivid Radio announcing her return to the adult industry and stated that she would begin her first feature dance tour back into the business by February 2016. On February 1, 2016, it was announced that she had signed a contract to become the face of Kayden Kross and Stoya's new company TrenchcoatX.

Rossi has used her platform to call into question the treatment of porn stars regarding their sexual abuse experiences in an interview with Amanda Knox and another publication.

== Personal life ==
From November 2013 to October 2014, she dated actor Charlie Sheen. They announced their engagement in February 2014 and had a wedding planned later in the year. They broke off their engagement in October. A month later, it was reported that Rossi was hospitalized for an apparent drug overdose. In 2015, Rossi sued Sheen after his announcement of being HIV positive and for various other allegations such as "assault and battery, emotional distress, false imprisonment and negligence". The case was referred to arbitration.

== Nominations ==
Year	Ceremony	Result	Award	Work
2013	AVN Award	Nominated	Best Girl-Girl Sex Scene	—N/a
2013	XBIZ Award	Nominated	Best Girl-Girl Sex Scene	—N/a
2014	AVN Award	Nominated	Best Girl-Girl Sex Scene	—N/a
2014	XBIZ Award	Nominated	Girl-Girl Performer of the Year	—N/a
2014	XBIZ Award	Nominated	Best Scene - All Girl (with Destiny Dixon)	—N/a
2017	XBIZ Award	Nominated	Crossover Star of the Year	—N/a
2017	XBIZ Award	Nominated	Performer Showcase of the Year	—N/a
2017	AVN Award	Nominated	Best Oral Sex Scene	—N/a
2017	AVN Award	Nominated	Best Star Showcase	—N/a
2017	AVN Award	Nominated	Best Three-Way Sex Scene - B/B/G	—N/a

== Filmography ==
Music videos
Year	Title	Role	Notes
2017	Pour Some Sugar on Me		Ninja Sex Party
