= Kyle Stone =

American pornographic actor (1963–2018)

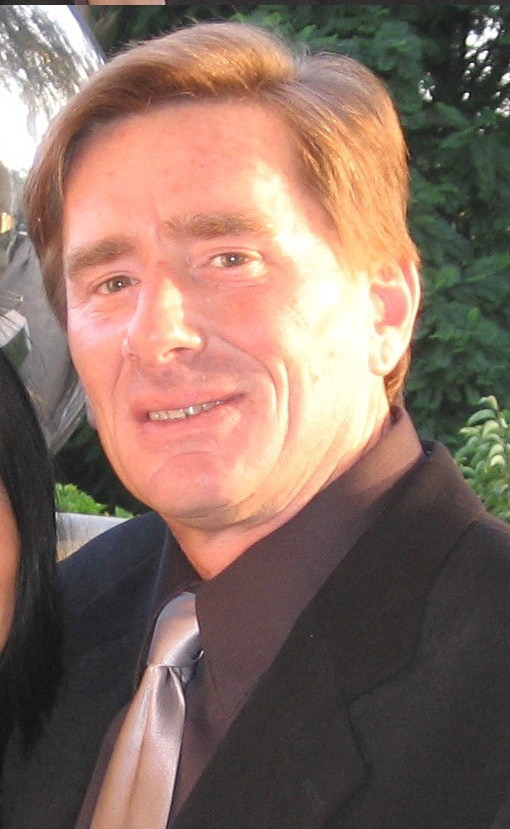
- Kyle Stone in 2006
- Born: Mark Hynes; October 18, 1963; California, United States
- Died: September 13, 2018 (aged 54); Santa Monica, California, United States
- Other names: Kyle, Roger Worth
- Occupations: Pornographic film actor, stand-up comedian
- Years active: 1993–2018
- Height: 5 ft 9 in (1.75 m)
- Website: twitter.com/thekylestone

Kyle Stone (born Mark Hynes; October 18, 1963 – September 13, 2018) was an American pornographic actor and stand-up comedian. Stone appeared in over 1,700 pornographic films over a career that spanned 25 years.

== Entry into pornography ==
Stone began working in the porn industry in 1993 after dialing a wrong number led to a sexual encounter with a porn actress known as Nasty Natasha. Stone was working at a law firm doing filing at the time, but decided to try doing pornography at Natasha's suggestion. Natasha was his first pornographic partner.

== Awards ==
Stone was inducted into the Adult Video News Hall of Fame in 2007 and the X-Rated Critics' Organization Hall of Fame in 2018. He also two Adult Video News awards for non-sex performances in Hotel No Tell in 2013 and Conflicted in 2018.

== Non-pornographic career ==
In the later years of his career, Stone tended to act less frequently in pornographic films, and when he did find work, it was often in non-sex roles. He cited the use of erectile dysfunction drugs in the porn industry as the reason for his lack of offers. In a 2008 interview with Adult Video News, he described the autobiography he was working on as "It's basically about how the pill has changed the industry and basically how it cost me my career. I was one of the 25 guys in this industry who could naturally perform and once the pharmaceutical companies came out with the ED drugs, pretty much almost everybody could do my job." Stone also began appearing as a stand-up comedian and discussed his porn career in his act.

== Death ==
Stone died in his sleep at the age of 54 on September 13, 2018, in Santa Monica, California. The cause of death was later determined to be atherosclerotic cardiovascular disease. He was survived by an older brother and two younger brothers, as well as a girlfriend of two years.
