= Emily Willis =

American pornographic film actress (born 1999)

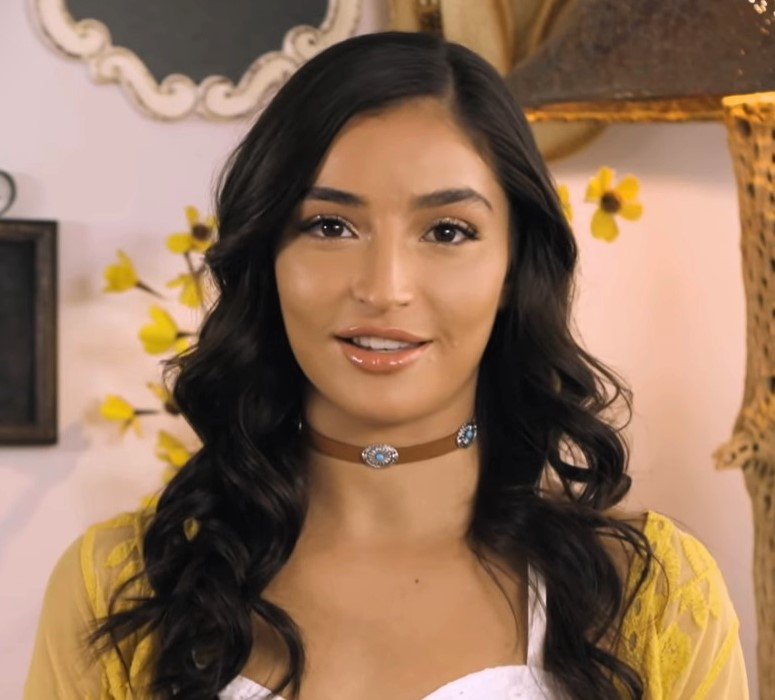
- Willis in 2020
- Born: 1999 (age 26–27); San Rafael, Mendoza, Argentina
- Occupations: Pornographic film actress; model
- Years active: 2017–2024

Emily Willis (born 1999) is an American former pornographic film actress. She was Penthouse Pet of the Month in May 2019 and won multiple AVN Awards in 2021.

== Early life ==
Willis was born in San Rafael, Mendoza, Argentina, in 1999. After her parents separated, her mother married an American citizen and relocated the family to the small town of St. George, Utah, when Willis was seven years old. Willis grew up as part of the Church of Jesus Christ of Latter-day Saints. After graduating from high school a year early, she moved to San Diego, California, where she worked as a door-to-door salesperson.

== Adult film career ==
Willis began her adult film career in 2017 after meeting an actor through a dating app who was affiliated with the company GirlsDoPorn. The company was later shut down after several of the owners and employees were found liable for fraud amid an FBI investigation of sex trafficking. The investigation found that the company had published fake ads soliciting young women for modeling work; the women were then pressured to perform in a pornographic scene ostensibly to be sold to private buyers, and promised between US$2,000 and US$6,000, which was never paid. Willis later told XBIZ, "I knew from the start that I was being lied to about the scenes" and "It just didn't matter to me, I wanted to do porn regardless." She would go on to star in over 700 films.

Willis moved to Las Vegas in early 2018, later moving to Los Angeles. She was named Penthouse Pet of the Month in May 2019. In May 2020, she starred in her first double penetration scene for The Insatiable Emily Willis, produced by Jules Jordan. Willis won AVN Awards for Female Performer of the Year and Best All-Girl Movie or Anthology in 2021. Hollywood Reporter described Willis as having become, by 2021, "among the most prominent adult performers in the world". Willis continued to work in the adult industry into 2023, producing content for OnlyFans under a management agency.

== Mainstream media appearances ==
In April 2022, Willis joined the cast of director Eddie Alcazar's thriller film Divinity. Jacob Oller wrote in Paste that "an extended sex scene with porn star Emily Willis is exhaustingly dull". Nadir Samara wrote in Screen Rant that performances by Willis, along with those of other actors, gave the film "the tone that sets it apart from anything else you will see this year". In an interview with XBIZ in 2023 about Divinity, Willis expressed a desire to star in more mainstream acting roles.

In 2023, Willis appeared in the music video for the Grammy-nominated single "Hive Mind" by American heavy metal band Slipknot.

== Personal life ==
In 2021, Willis filed a $5 million defamation lawsuit against fellow pornographic film actresses Gianna Dior, Adria Rae, and ten other unnamed defendants over Twitter posts that they had made. The lawsuit was dismissed without prejudice in 2025, due to no one appearing on the incapacitated Willis' behalf. Willis started her own clothing line, EmFatale, which Hollywood Reporter described as having "fizzled out", after the initial clothing release.

Willis was found unconscious following a cardiac arrest in February 2024 in Summit Malibu, a drug rehabilitation center in Los Angeles where she had been seeking treatment for ketamine addiction, approximately a week after being admitted to the facility. Despite staff concern over her health, Willis reportedly repeatedly refused to be transferred to urgent care prior to the incident. The resulting lack of oxygen led to irreversible and debilitating brain damage.

In April 2024, her family said that Willis was awake after a two-month coma, saying she still remained severely disabled and unable to move or speak, although able to track objects with her eyes. In 2025, her family filed a lawsuit for fraud and negligence against Summit Malibu. In 2026, her family was awarded a $3 million settlement from the rehabilitation center. Willis reportedly received $1.26 million in compensation after fees, which will be largely used by her family for her long-term care bills.

== Awards ==
List of awards
Year	Event	Award	Film
2020	AVN Award	Best Anal Sex Scene (with Ramón Nomar)	Emily Willis: The Anal Awakening
2020	XBIZ Award	Best Sex Scene – Vignette (with Jane Wilde and Prince Yahshua)	Disciples of Desire: Bad Cop – Bad City
2020	Doppio Senso Night Award	Best International New Starlet	—N/a
2020	NightMoves Award	Best Female Performer (Editor's Choice)	—N/a
2020	Adult Empire Award	Pornstar of the Year	—N/a
2021	AVN Award	Female Performer of the Year	—N/a
2021	AVN Award	Best Star Showcase	The Insatiable Emily Willis
2021	AVN Award	Best Double-Penetration Sex Scene (with Steve Holmes and Mick Blue)	The Insatiable Emily Willis
2021	AVN Award	Best Three-Way Sex Scene – B/B/G (with Prince Yahshua and Rob Piper)	The Insatiable Emily Willis
2021	AVN Award	Best Blowbang Scene	Facialized 7: Emily Willis 10 Man Blowbang
2021	AVN Award	Best All-Girl Group Sex Scene (with Riley Reid and Kristen Scott)	Paranormal
2021	AVN Award	Best Girl/Girl Sex Scene (with Elsa Jean)	Elsa Jean: Influence
2021	AVN Award	Best POV Sex Scene (with Mick Blue)	Emily Willis: Car BJ & POV Fucking
2021	AVN Award	Mainstream Venture of the Year (with Ariana Marie, Mia Malkova, Ivy Wolfe, Amia Miley, Mia Melano, Vicki Chase, Skin Diamond, Scarlit Scandal, Cecilia Lion, Avery Cristy, Nia Nacci, Sarai Minx, Kira Noir, Alina Lopez, and Gabbie Carter)	G-Eazy x Vixen Music Video Collaboration (Still Be Friends/Moana)
2021	XBIZ Award	Female Performer of the Year	—N/a
2021	XRCO Award	Female Performer of the Year	—N/a
2022	AVN Award	Best Lesbian Group Sex Scene (with Gina Valentina, Gia Derza, and Autumn Falls)	We Live Together Season 1 – Episode 4: Saying Goodbye
2022	AVN Award	Best Girl/Girl Sex Scene (with Vanna Bardot)	Light Me Up
2022	AVN Award	Best International Group Sex Scene (with Little Caprice, Apolonia Lapiedra, and Alberto Blanco)	Vibes 4: Better Together
2022	AVN Award	Best Star Showcase	Influence: Emily Willis
2022	AVN Award	Best Gangbang Scene (with Rob Piper, Anton Harden, Isiah Maxwell, and Tee Reel)	Influence: Emily Willis
2022	XCritic Award	Best G/G Scene (with Kayden Kross)	Influence: Emily Willis
2022	XBIZ Award	Best Sex Scene – Performer Showcase (with Mick Blue and Dante Colle)	Influence: Emily Willis
2022	XBIZ Award	Female Performer of the Year	—N/a
2022	Pornhub Award	Top Lesbian Performer	—N/a
2022	XRCO Award	Female Performer of the Year (tied with Gianna Dior)	—N/a
2022	XRCO Award	Best Star Showcase	Influence: Emily Willis
2022	XRCO Award	Awesome Analist	—N/a
2022	Doppio Senso Night Award	International Female Performer of the Year	—N/a
2023	Pornhub Award	Top Anal Performer – Female	—N/a

== Selected filmography ==
Year	Movie	Honors and awards won	
2019	Dred's Teen Devastation 2	2019 Urban X Awards	Best All-Sex Release
2019	Emily Willis: The Anal Awakening	2020 AVN Awards	Best Anal Sex Scene, Emily Willis and Ramon Nomar
2019	Consent	2020 AVN Awards	Best Gonzo Production
2019	Drive	2020 AVN Awards	Best Drama
2019	Teenage Lesbian	2020 AVN Awards	Best All-Girl Narrative Production Movie of the Year
2019	Teenage Lesbian	2020 XBIZ Awards	All-Girl Feature Movie of the Year Feature Movie of the Year
2019	Disciples of Desire: Bad Cop Bad City	2020 XBIZ Awards	Best Sex Scene – Vignette, Emily Willis, Jane Wilde, Prince Yahshua
2019	We Like Girls Project 2	2020 XBIZ Awards	All-Girl Non-Feature Release of the Year
2019	Art Of Anal Sex 11	2021 AVN Awards	Best Anal Movie or Anthology
2019	Squirt On Me	2021 AVN Awards	Best Squirting Movie or Anthology
2020	Paranormal	2021 AVN Awards	Best All-Girl Group Sex Scene, Emily Willis, Kristen Scott, Riley Reid Best All-Girl Movie or Anthology
2020	Facialized 7	2021 AVN Awards	Best Oral Movie or Anthology
2020	Oil Overload 16	2021 AVN Awards	Best Gonzo/Wall-to-Wall Movie or Anthology
2020	Insatiable Emily Willis	2021 AVN Awards	Best Three-Way Sex Scene – B/B/G, Emily Willis, Prince Yahshua, Rob Piper Best Double Penetration Sex Scene, Emily Willis, Mick Blue, Steve Holmes Best Star Showcase, Emily Willis
2020	Influence	2021 AVN Awards	Best Girl/Girl Sex Scene, Elsa Jean, Emily Willis
2020	Influence	2021 XBIZ Awards	Vignette Movie of the Year
2021	Influence 2	2022 AVN Awards	Best Star Showcase Best Gangbang Scene, Anton Harden, Emily Willis, Isiah Maxwell, Rob Piper, Tee Reel
2021	Influence 2	2022 XBIZ Awards	Best Sex Scene – Performer Showcase, Dante Colle, Emily Willis, Mick Blue
2021	Hot Girl Summer	2022 XBIZ Awards	Gonzo Movie of the Year
2021	Down 2 Fuck	2021 Nightmoves	Best All Sex/Gonzo Release
2021	Cougariffic 2	2023 AVN Awards	Best Female Mixed-Age Movie or Limited Series
2022	Play 2	2023 AVN Awards	Best All-Girl Movie
