= 36th AVN Awards =

US adult industry award ceremony in 2019

- 36th AVN Awards promotional poster
- Date: January 28, 2019
- Site: Hard Rock Hotel & Casino; Las Vegas, Nevada, United States
- Hosted by: Romi Rain and Bailey Rayne

Highlights
- Best Picture: The Possession Of Mrs. Hyde
- Most awards: I Am Angela (5 awards); The Possession Of Mrs. Hyde (5 awards)

Television coverage
- Network: Showtime

The 36th AVN Awards was a pornography award show presented by Adult Video News (AVN). It took place on January 28, 2019 at the Hard Rock Hotel and Casino in Las Vegas, Nevada.

It was hosted by adult performers Romi Rain and Bailey Rayne, and comedian Esther Ku, with a musical performance by American rapper Cardi B.

== Winners and Nominees ==
The winners were announced during the awards ceremony on January 27, 2019.

The major performer awards went to Angela White, AVN Female Performer of the Year Award; Manuel Ferrara, Male Performer of the Year and Ivy Wolfe, Best New Starlet.

=== Major awards ===
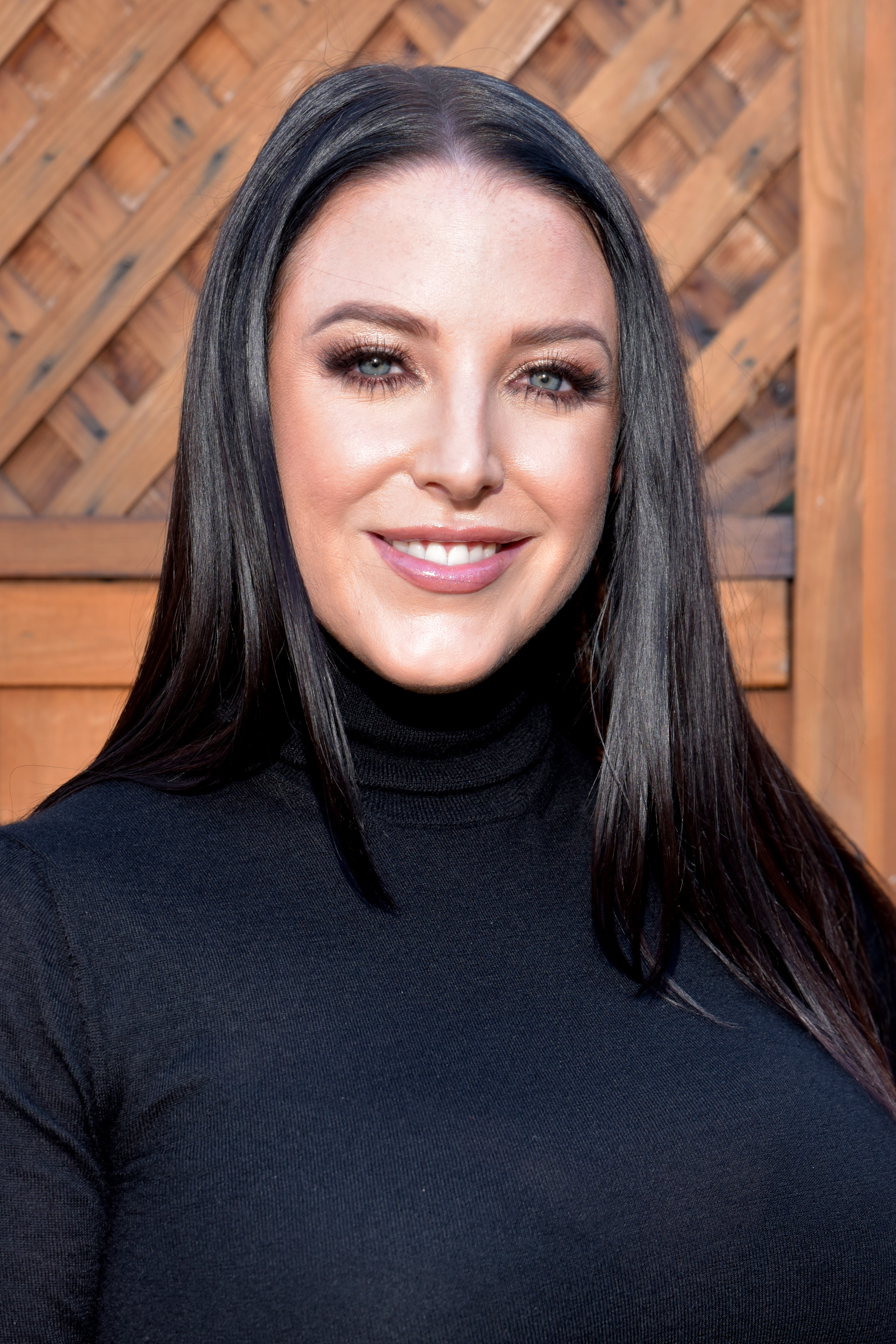
Angela White, winner of the 2019 AVN Female Performer of the Year Award

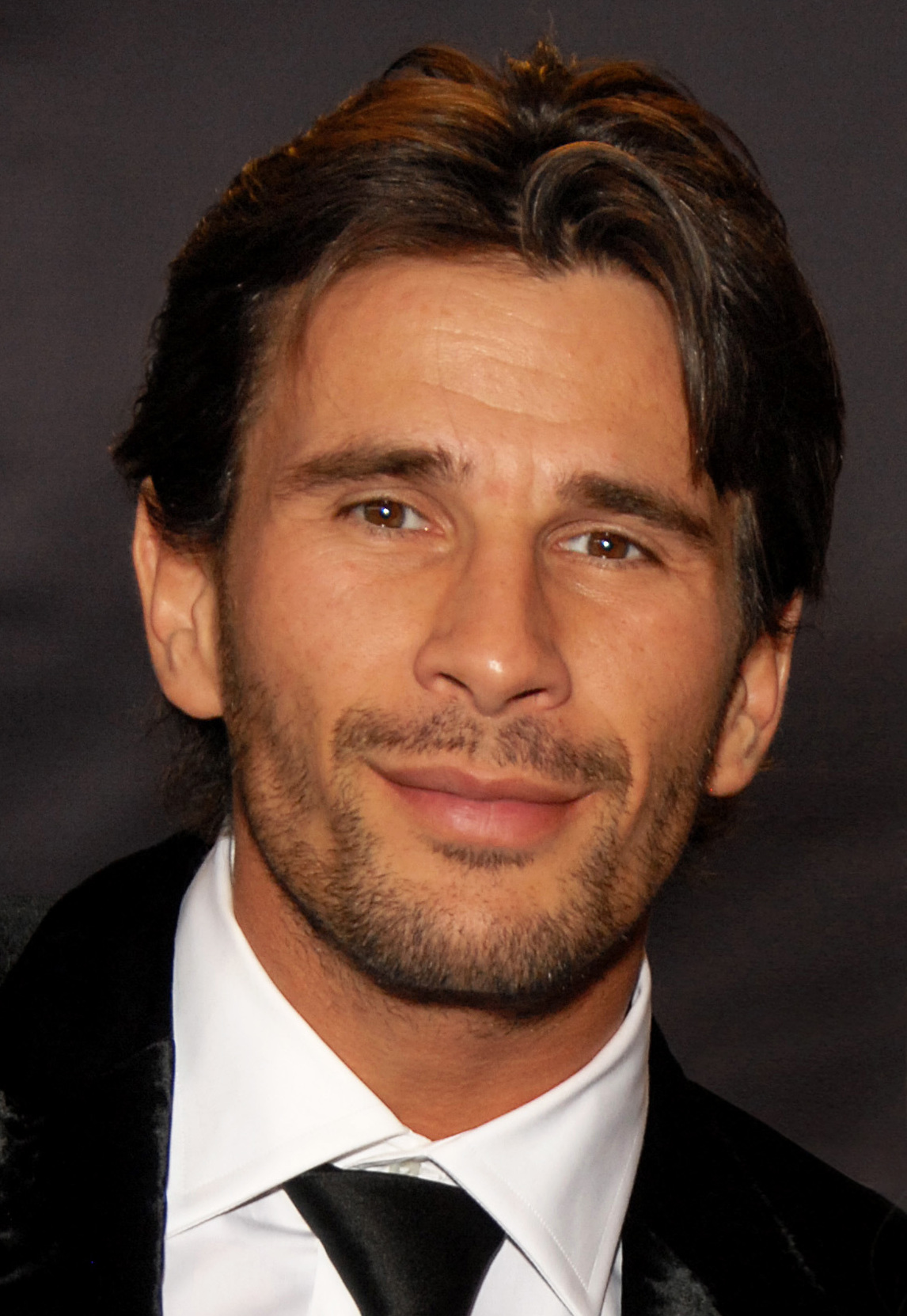
Manuel Ferrara, winner of the 2019 Male Performer of the year

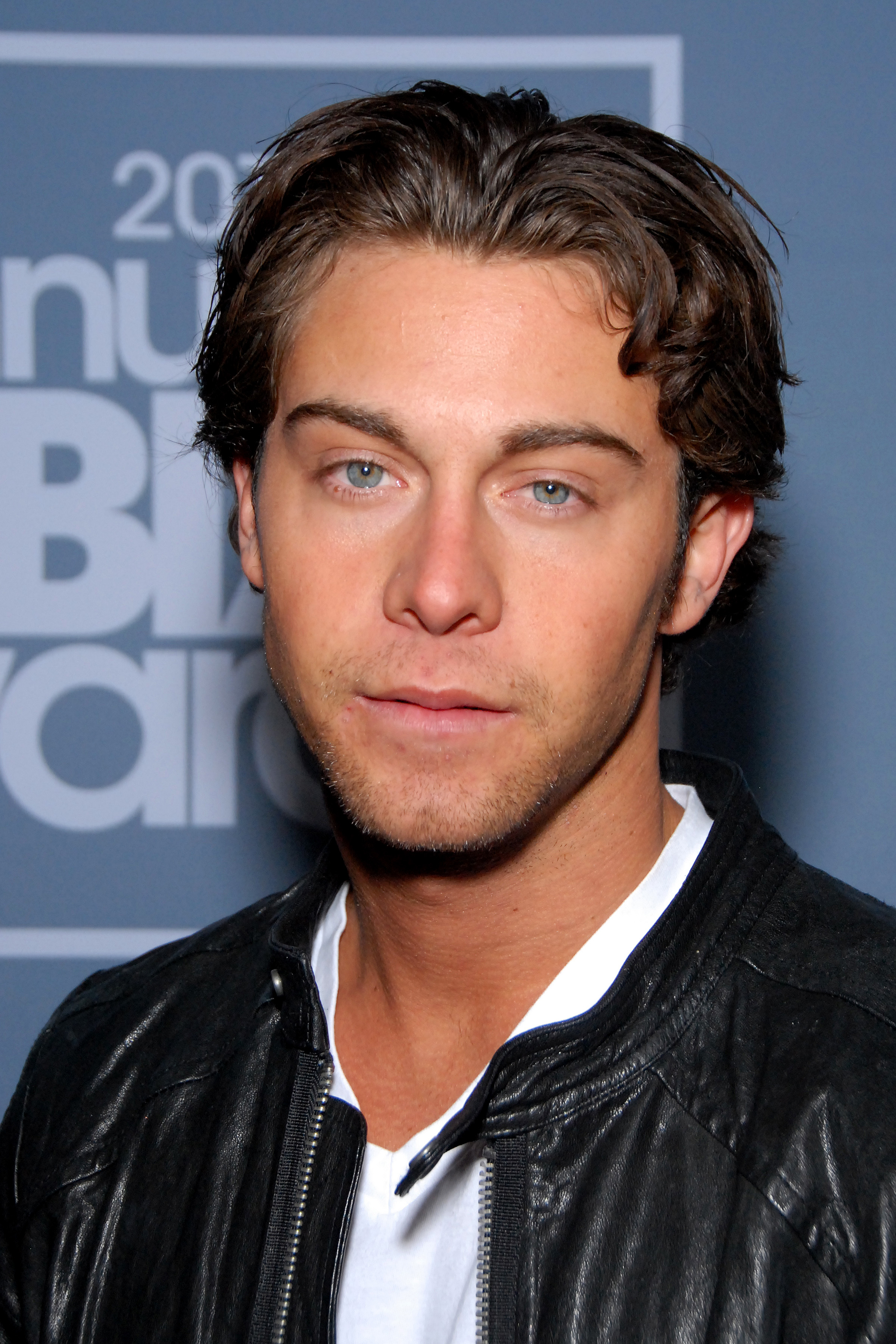
Seth Gamble, winner of the 2019 Best Actor Award

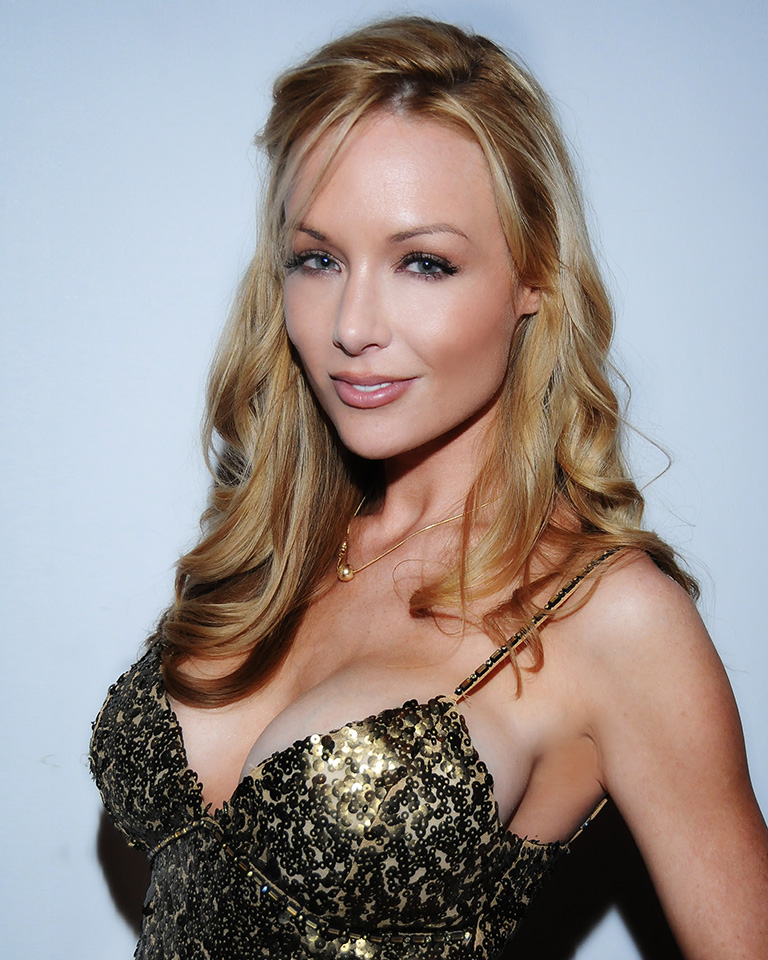
Kayden Kross, Director of the Year for 2019

Winners of categories announced during the awards ceremony January 27, 2019, are highlighted in boldface and indicated with a double dagger (‡).

Movie of the Year	All-Girl Performer of the Year
**The Possession of Mrs. Hyde**‡ (Best Action/Thriller); A 40 Year Old Widow (Best Foreign Feature/Anthology); After Dark (Best Drama); Deadpool XXX: An Axel Braun Parody (Best Parody); I Am Angela (Best Star Showcase); Icons (Best Anthology); Love in the Digital Age (Best Comedy); (Rather than nominees for this category, contenders are chosen from the winners in the "Best Release" categories. Voting is conducted separately just prior to the awards ceremony.)	**Charlotte Stokely**‡; Ayumi Anime; Serena Blair; Jayden Cole; Val Dodds; Darcie Dolce; Kendra James; Shyla Jennings; Georgia Jones; Ivy Jones; Milana May; Mindi Mink; Prinzzess; Sabina Rouge; Scarlett Sage; Jenna Sativa
Male Performer of the Year	Female Performer of the Year
**Manuel Ferrara** ‡; Mick Blue; Xander Corvus; James Deen; Dredd; Markus Dupree; Small Hands; Steve Holmes; Ricky Johnson; Jessy Jones; Keiran Lee; Mandingo; Ramón Nomar; Tommy Pistol; Johnny Sins	**Angela White**‡; Abella Danger; Honey Gold; Katrina Jade; Elsa Jean; Jill Kassidy; Abigail Mac; Ariana Marie; Kira Noir; Riley Reid; Kristen Scott; Kissa Sins; Gina Valentina; Whitney Wright
Best Male Newcomer	Best New Starlet
**Jason Luv**‡; Indiana Bones; Cash Boss; Stirling Cooper; Lil D; Dustin Daring; Oliver Flynn; Johnny Goodluck; Quinton James; Connor Kennedy; Brad Newman; Sam Shock; Louie Smalls; Brad Sterling; Zac Wild	**Ivy Wolfe**‡; Gia Derza; Hannah Hays; Eliza Ibarra; Ella Knox; Tana Lea; Alina Lopez; Hime Marie; Nia Nacci; Kenzie Reeves; Karma Rx; Nicolette Shea; Kendra Spade; Jane Wilde; Emily Willis
Transsexual Performer of the Year	Director of the Year
**Chanel Santini**‡; Shiri Allwood; Michelle Austin; Aspen Brooks; Kayleigh Coxx; Korra Del Rio; Foxxy; Aubrey Kate; Khloe Kay; Lena Kelly; Casey Kisses; Annabelle Lane; Natalie Mars; Domino Presley; Tyler St. Syn	**Kayden Kross**‡; Joanna Angel; James Avalon; Axel Braun; Jules Jordan; Mason; Bree Mills; MimeFreak; Pat Myne; Eddie Powell; Mike Quasar; Jacky St. James; Stills by Alan; Dana Vespoli; Andy Zane
Best Actor - Feature	Best Actress - Feature
**Seth Gamble, Deadpool XXX: An Axel Braun Parody**‡; Brad Armstrong, The Cursed XXX; Johnny Castle, The Finisher: A DP XXX Parody; Xander Corvus, Xander's World Tour; Danny D., NeverMore; James Deen, Starfucked; Ryan Driller, The Seduction of Heidi; Robby Echo, Hand Solo: A DP XXX Parody; Small Hands, A Trailer Park Taboo; Steve Holmes, Dirty Grandpa; Ryan McLane, Cursed; Derrick Pierce, Second First Date; Logan Pierce, Love in the Digital Age; Tommy Pistol, Anne: A Taboo Parody; Michael Vegas, How I Fucked Your Mother: A XXX Parody	Eliza Jane, **Anne: A Taboo Parody**‡; Britney Amber, Naked; Mercedes Carrera, Second First Date; Adriana Chechik, Star Wars: The Last Temptation - A Digital Playground XXX Parody; Jessica Drake, Fallen II: Angels & Demons; Kimmy Granger, Poon Raider: A DP XXX Parody; Aaliyah Love, Too Little Too Late; Avi Love, The Possession of Mrs. Hyde; Abigail Mac, Fantasy Factory: Wastelands; Gia Paige, Love in the Digital Age; Kenzie Reeves, A Trailer Park Taboo; Kristen Scott, Camgirl; India Summer, Flawless; Mona Wales, Insomnia; Whitney Wright, Cursed
Best Action/Thriller	Best Drama
**The Possession of Mrs. Hyde**‡; Cartel Sex; The Coven Wives; Criminal Passions; The Cursed XXX; Dark Obsession; Fantasy Factory: Wastelands; Fly Girls: Final Payload; Girls With Guns; The Matchmaker; NeverMore; One Step Ahead; The Puppeteer; Squirtwoman: Wasteland; Undercover	**After Dark**‡; Adoration; Camgirl; Fallen II: Angels & Demons; The Game; Hollywood Ending; Insomnia; Invictus; Mind Fucked: A Cult Classic; Never Forgotten; Paparazzi; The Seduction of Heid; Talk Derby to Me; A Trailer Park Taboo; Trashy Love Story; The Voyeur 2
Best Girl/Girl Sex Scene	Best Boy/Girl Sex Scene
**Abigail Mac, Kissa Sins; Abigail**‡; Ariana Marie, Jill Kassidy; Ariana Marie: A Little Bit Harder; Charlotte Stokely, Sabina Rouge; Axel Braun's Girlfest; Shyla Jennings, Sadie Blake; Bare; Jenna Sativa, Mary Moody; Erotic Tales; Verónica Rodríguez, Rina Ellis; Girls Gone Pink; Gina Valentina, Sydney Cole; I Screw Girls; Julie Kay, Olive Glass; Interracial Girlfriends 3; Prinzzess, Zoey Monroe; Prinzzess: A Decade of Desire; Ivy Wolfe, Scarlett Sage; Sage Union; Lily Adams, Kristen Scott; School's Out; Adria Rae, Kimmy Granger; Skinny Dipping; Ella Knox, Katya Rodriguez; Snatch Chat; Joanna Angel, Stoya; Talk Derby to Me; Holly Hendrix, Evelyn Claire; Trashy Love Story	**Avi Love, Ramón Nomar, The Possession of Mrs. Hyde**‡; Kelsi Monroe, Tyler Steele, Ass Parade 66; Kenzie Reeves, Brick Danger, Backseat Banging 5; Misty Stone, James Deen, Cartel Sex; Ivy Wolfe, Chad White, Déjà Vu; Evelyn Claire, Manuel Ferrara, The Female of the Species; Jill Kassidy, Tommy Pistol, Future Darkly; Alina Lopez, Markus Dupree, Hot Bodies 3; Riley Reid, Tommy Pistol, Killer Blowjobs; Sinderella, Mick Blue, More Than a Thrill; Tori Black, Jean Val Jean, Natural Beauties 6; Adria Rae, James Deen, Petites; Angela White, Markus Dupree, Serendipity; Carolina Sweets, Ryan Madison, Split Screen; Ariana Marie, Xander Corvus, XXX Parodies
Favorite Camming Cosplayer	Favorite Cam Girl
**EliseLaurenne**‡; Adrenna Lyne, adysweet, Alex Harper, AnimeAnnie, Ari Dee, Avalynn Rose, Caitierage, Catjira, ClaraCosmia, Denver_Max, DesignerMissy, Ela Darling, Elise Rivers, Ellie Idol, Emilia Song, Felicia Vox, Hackergirl, HelloCourtney, HyruleFairy, JadeCreates, KaileyKetchum, Kinky Candy, KittyQuinn, Koneko Katana, Lana Rain, Layla Savage, Leya Falcon, LiveCleo, Marica Hase, Molly Stewart, Pervy the Clown, RinCity, ShandaFay, Temptress Lux, Vera Bambi	**Kati3kat**‡; Aria Nina, Ashlyn Diamond, Aspen Rae, Bailey Rayne, Brielle Day, CarminaHot1, Cherry Crush, Cherry Devivre, Chroniclove, Clara Kitty, Crystal Knight, Daisy Destin, Devious Angel, Ella Silver, Emily Bloom, Emma Banks, Eva Devine, Eve Thompson, Ginger Banks, Golden Kittee, Harley Rose, Harli Lotts, HeidiV, HottyTeen69, Jay Lynn, Jess Victoria, Joey Kim, Katie Summers, KoryBlu, Lala_Capri, Lindsey Banks, LittleRedBunny, Livia Choice, Madelene Ray, MalibuBomb, Mia Shelby, Nikki Eliot, NoahBensi, Ora Young, PrincessSnowAngel, Rae Riley, Raquelle Diva, Reya Sunshine, RocknRose, Salena Storm, SammyStrips, Sasha Red, Sasha Swan, Scout, ShyCountryCutie, SnugglePunk, Stefanie Joy, Sunhiee, Tricia Fox, Veronika Rose

=== Additional award winners ===
The following is the list of remaining award category winners, which were announced during the awards ceremony, but presented with their awards apart from the actual event.

**VIDEO AND WEB CATEGORIES**

- Best Actor – Featurette: Tommy Pistol, The Weight of Infidelity, PureTaboo.com
- Best Actress – Featurette: Angela White, Who's Becky (from Games We Play), Trenchcoatx
- Best All-Girl Group Sex Scene: Ivy Wolfe, Eliza Jane, Jenna Sativa, A Flapper Girl Story
- Best All-Girl Movie: Angela Loves Women 4
- Best All-Girl Series: Women Seeking Women
- Best Anal Movie: First Anal 6
- Best Anal Series: Anal Beauty
- Best Anal Sex Scene: Angela White, Rocco Siffredi, I Am Angela
- Best Anthology Movie: Icons
- Best Art Direction: Deadpool XXX: An Axel Braun Parody
- Best BDSM Movie: Hotwife Bound 3
- Best Cinematography: Winston Henry, After Dark
- Best Comedy: Love in the Digital Age
- Best Continuing Series: Natural Beauties
- Best Director – Feature: Axel Braun, The Possession of Mrs. Hyde
- Best Director – Non-Feature: Evil Chris, I Am Angela
- Best Director – Web Channel/Site: Lee Roy Myers, WoodRocket.com
- Best Double-Penetration Sex Scene: Abigail Mac, Jax Slayher, Prince Yahshua, Abigail
- Best Editing: Evil Ricky, I Am Angela
- Best Ethnic Movie: My Asian Hotwife 3
- Best Ethnic/Interracial Series: My First Interracial
- Best Featurette: The Weight of Infidelity, PureTaboo.com
- Best Foreign Feature/Anthology Movie: A 40 Year Old Widow
- Best Foreign-Shot All-Girl Sex Scene: Megan Rain, Mina Sauvage, Undercover
- Best Foreign-Shot Anal Sex Scene: Clea Gaultier, Kristof Cale, Charlie Dean, The Prisoner
- Best Foreign-Shot Boy/Girl Sex Scene: Rose Valerie, Ricky Mancini, Rose, Escort Deluxe
- Best Foreign-Shot Group Sex Scene: Alexa Tomas, Megan Rain, Apolonia Lapiedra, Emilio Ardana, Undercover
- Best Gonzo Movie: A XXX Documentary
- Best Group Sex Scene: Tori Black, Jessa Rhodes, Mia Malkova, Abella Danger, Kira Noir, Vicki Chase, Angela White, Ana Foxxx, Bambino, Mick Blue, Ricky Johnson, Ryan Driller, Alex Jones, After Dark
- Best Ingénue Movie: Best New Starlets 2018
- Best Interracial Movie: Interracial Icon 6
- Best Lewd Propositions Movie: The Psychiatrist
- Best Makeup: Dusty Lynn, Cammy Ellis, Deadpool XXX: An Axel Braun Parody
- Best Marketing Campaign – Company Image: Vixen Media Group
- Best Marketing Campaign – Individual Project: I Am Angela, Evil Angel Films
- Best MILF Movie: MILF Performers of the Year 2018
- Best New Imprint: Blacked Raw
- Best New Series: Lesbian Lessons
- Best Niche Movie: Evil Squirters 5
- Best Niche Series: Squirt for Me
- Best Non-Sex Performance: Kyle Stone, Never Forgotten
- Best Older Woman/Younger Girl Movie: The Lesbian Experience: Women Loving Girls 3
- Best Oral Movie: Gag Reflex 3
- Best Oral Sex Scene: Angela White, Angela by Darkko
- Best Orgy/Gangbang Movie: Gangbang Me 3
- Best Parody: Deadpool XXX: An Axel Braun Parody
- Best Polyamory Movie: Watching My Hotwife 3
- Best Pro-Am/Exhibitionist Movie: Mick's Pornstar Initiations
- Best Screenplay: Lasse Braun, Axel Braun, Rikki Braun, The Possession of Mrs. Hyde

**Video and Web (ctd.)**

- Best Solo/Tease Performance: Kissa Sins, The Corruption of Kissa Sins
- Best Soundtrack: Hamiltoe, WoodRocket
- Best Special Effects: Star Wars: The Last Temptation – A Digital Playground XXX Parody
- Best Star Showcase: I Am Angela
- Best Supporting Actor: Charles Dera, Cartel Sex
- Best Supporting Actress: Joanna Angel, A Trailer Park Taboo
- Best Taboo Relations Movie: Sibling Seductions 2
- Best Three-Way Sex Scene – Boy/Boy/Girl: Honey Gold, Chris Strokes, Jules Jordan, Slut Puppies 12
- Best Three-Way Sex Scene – Girl/Girl/Boy: Angela White, Kissa Sins, Markus Dupree, The Corruption of Kissa Sins
- Best Transsexual Movie: Aubrey Kate: TS Superstar
- Best Transsexual Series: Trans-Visions
- Best Transsexual Sex Scene: Aubrey Kate, Lance Hart, Eli Hunter, Will Havoc, Ruckus, Colby Jansen, D. Arclyte, Aubrey Kate: TS Superstar
- Best Virtual Reality Product/Site: NaughtyAmericaVR.com
- Best Virtual Reality Sex Scene: Marley Brinx, John Strong, Wonder Woman (A XXX Parody), VR Bangers
- Clever Title of the Year: Hamiltoe, WoodRocket
- Female Foreign Performer of the Year: Anissa Kate
- Foreign Director of the Year: Rocco Siffredi
- Mainstream Star of the Year: Stormy Daniels
- Mainstream Venture of the Year: Asa Akira, Family Guy guest appearance
- MILF Performer of the Year: Cherie DeVille
- Male Foreign Performer of the Year: Rocco Siffredi
- Most Outrageous Sex Scene: Charlotte Sartre, Margot Downonme, Tommy Pistol in "My First Boy/Girl/Puppet," The Puppet Inside Me, WoodRocket
- Niche Performer of the Year: Karla Lane

**PLEASURE PRODUCTS CATEGORIES**

- Best Condom Manufacturer: Okamoto
- Best Enhancement Manufacturer: Boneyard/Rascal Toys
- Best Fetish Manufacturer: Bad Dragon
- Best Lingerie or Apparel Manufacturer: Coquette
- Best Lubricant Manufacturer: Pjur
- Best Pleasure Product Manufacturer – Large: Doc Johnson
- Best Pleasure Product Manufacturer – Medium: Satisfyer
- Best Pleasure Product Manufacturer – Small: Motorbunny

**RETAIL CATEGORIES**

- Best Boutique: Chi Chi LaRue's, Los Angeles
- Best Retail Chain – Large (11+ stores): Hustler Hollywood
- Best Retail Chain – Medium (6-10 stores): Taf Distributing
- Best Retail Chain – Small (2-5 stores): She Bop
- Best Web Retail Store: DallasNovelty.com

**FAN AWARD CATEGORIES**

- Favorite BBW Porn Star: Alura Jenson
- Favorite Cam Guy: Aamir Desire
- Favorite Camming Couple: 19honeysuckle (aka Honey and Tom Christian)
- Favorite Female Porn Star: Angela White
- Favorite Indie Clip Star: Cory Chase
- Favorite Male Porn Star: Johnny Sins
- Favorite Porn Star Website: ReidMyLips.com
- Favorite Trans Cam Star: Aubrey Kate
- Favorite Trans Porn Star: Chanel Santini
- Hottest MILF: Kendra Lust
- Hottest Newcomer: Alina Lopez
- Most Epic Ass: Abella Danger
- Most Spectacular Boobs: Angela White
- Social Media Star: Riley Reid

== AVN Honorary Awards ==
=== Hall of Fame ===
AVN on January 21, 2019, announced the 2018 inductees into its hall of fame, who were later honored with a January 22 cocktail party and then a video as the awards show opened.

- Video Branch: Asa Akira, Gabrielle Anex, Lexi Belle, Frank Bukkwyd, Maestro Claudio, Kiki Daire, Dirty Harry, Ed Hunter, Kayden Kross, Micky Lynn, Ramón Nomar, Serena, Mark Stevens, Misty Stone, India Summer
- Executive Branch: Bernard Braunstein and Ed Braunstein, Renae Orenstein-Englehart, Jim Kohls
- Internet Founders Branch: Nick Chrétien, Stan Fiskin, Mitch Fontaine

== Media and entertainment ==
The award show was broadcast on Showtime. Rapper Cardi B performed.
