= Jake Adams =

Jake Adams is the name of:

- Jake Adams, bassist for New Zealand band Steriogram
- Jake Adams (pornographic actor), American pornographic actor
