= Muse (web series) =

Film series

- Genre: Drama; Pornographic
- Created by: Kayden Kross
- Written by: Kayden Kross
- Directed by: Kayden Kross
- Starring: Maitland Ward; Adriana Chechik; Gianna Dior; Lena Paul; Scarlit Scandal; Manuel Ferrara; Aubrey Kate; Avery Christy; Lulu Chu; Vanna Bardot; Destiny Cruz
- Country of origin: United States
- Original language: English
- No. of seasons: 2
- No. of episodes: 11

Production
- Editor: Duboko
- Production company: Deeper

Original release
- Release: September 18, 2020 – October 21, 2021

Muse is a pornographic drama series written and directed by Kayden Kross, and produced by Deeper, and distributed by Pulse Distribution.

It stars an ensemble cast that includes Maitland Ward, Adriana Chechik, Gianna Dior, Lena Paul, Scarlit Scandal and Manuel Ferrara. The series has received overall positive feedback from the industry, winning dozens of major industry accolades.

The first season was released on September 18, 2020, and the second on September 16, 2021. The first season received eleven nominations at the 38th AVN Awards, winning seven, including Grand Reel, Best Screenplay and Best Directing – Drama for Kross, Best Actress for Ward, and Best Editing for Duboko. For her performance, Ward won two XBIZ, XRCO and XCritic Awards for Best Actress.

== Episodes ==
Season	Episodes	Originally released	
Season	Episodes	First released	Last released
1	5	September 18, 2020	October 15, 2020
Special		November 12, 2020	
2	5	September 16, 2021	October 21, 2021

=== Season 1 (2020) ===
No. overall	No. in season	Title	Directed by	Starring	Original release date
1	1	"Episode 1"	Kayden Kross	Maitland Ward, Dante Colle	September 18, 2020
Acclaimed author, documentary filmmaker, professor, and—Infamously—an activist formerly employed in the sex industry, Maitland Ward’s notoriety precedes her. An educator at heart, she is quick to direct the discussion forward, and to exact discipline wherever necessary.
2	2	"Episode 2"	Kayden Kross	Gianna Dior, Scarlit Scandal, Rob Piper	September 24, 2020
Scarlit is torn between her obligations as a daughter and desire to follow her own path. When she decides to lean into the conflict she finds at the center, an idea strikes. Gianna and Rob help execute it. Lena grapples with the demands of her son. Adriana is inspired by a cord of rope found in Seth’s bedroom. Maitland examines the emotional payoff of libertinism.
3	3	"Episode 3"	Kayden Kross	Adriana Chechik, Maitland Ward, Isiah Maxwell, Sly Diggler	October 1, 2020
Adriana’s relationship hits a breaking point, sending her running to the only doorstep she can think of in the city. Maitland answers. The two men just behind her wait patiently. Gabbie finishes her work in a rush of inspiration.
4	4	"Episode 4"	Kayden Kross	Lena Paul, Troy Francisco	October 8, 2020
As the due date looms, each student takes another look at their approach to the project. Adriana must make a choice. Lena finds a way to make space for herself again. Maitland drives the lesson forward.
5	5	"Episode 5"	Kayden Kross	Adriana Chechik, Seth Gamble	October 15, 2020
Resigned to return to her hometown, Adriana relies on Seth’s help to get back. Seth begs her to finish their work before she goes. For everyone, the assignment comes due. Maitland clicks through, and in the process finally pairs a face with the struggle she’s felt.

=== Special (2020) ===
No. overall	Title	Directed by	Starring	Original release date
6	"Continuum"	Kayden Kross	Maitland Ward, Manuel Ferrara	November 12, 2020
Maitland brings the lesson around on her way to surrendering to the man she'd been holding out against.

=== Season 2 (2021) ===
No. overall	No. in season	Title	Directed by	Starring	Original release date
7	1	"What We Are Missing"	Kayden Kross	Aubrey Kate, Destiny Cruz, Maitland Ward, Pierce Paris	September 16, 2021
Maitland Ward's notoriety is both her blessing and her curse, drawing people to her with a sometimes-obsessive intensity and at the same time keeping her walled off from the relationships she values most. As she sends students home with a new assignment, we begin to understand that the prompt is more pressing than the usual exercises in classroom discussion.
8	2	"Every Behavior Meets a Need"	Kayden Kross	Ivy Wolfe, Manuel Ferrara	September 23, 2021
Aubrey finally finds a challenge worthy of her attention when Mona brings Ernest’s case to her desk. Lulu’s work/family balance worsens. We learn why Ivy hasn’t come home and why, but all focus is whiplashed toward Maitland when scandal breaks out.
9	3	"What We Have Lost"	Kayden Kross	Lulu Chu, Anton Harden	October 7, 2021
As Jessie leads the charge on the celebration of Lulu’s presentation, a damper mood settles over the group with the discussion of Maitland’s scandal, Lena’s quiet crisis, and Avery’s further unraveling relationship with Ivy. Behind closed doors, Manuel tries to calm Maitland down as she finally names her frustration with the pedestal she’s been placed on but the unspoken problem between them forces its way through again. By the end of the night, Lena finds connection in an unlikely place and Lulu is out for blood.
10	4	"Another’s Good"	Kayden Kross	Avery Cristy, Vanna Bardot, Quinton James	October 14, 2021
Aubrey and Mona double down on their strategy to drag Maitland’s case through the jury of the press as Maitland spirals toward hopelessness and keeps Manuel at a distance. Avery and Ivy’s relationship troubles finally come to a head. Jessie plots revenge as Lena stumbles across a line she’d never thought she would cross
11	5	"Break the Cycle"	Kayden Kross	Maitland Ward, Alex Jones, Danny Mountain, Rob Piper, Will Pounder	October 21, 2021
Ernest’s obsession with Maitland has not waned, and Mona tries to intercept those attentions. Ivy’s departure leaves a void that Avery turns to Lulu to fill as Jessie exacts her revenge. Maitland finds herself across from a student who needs her but can’t bridge the gap in this new landscape. Maitland snaps as Avery channels pent-up emotion toward the stage. The final showdown begins.

== Reception ==
=== Critical response ===
The series has received generally positive reviews from critics. An All Adult Network critic called the series an "exquisite piece of film making" and continued saying "...the shadings, looks, backgrounds, locales and pacing that Ms. Kross gives this piece really put this project over the top. Then add in some very crisp, sharp cinematography that provides masterful visuals and you have something very special. It has a number of well deserved nominations in the upcoming AVN awards and others and they are very well deserved." Another adult film critic website Die-Screaming.com compliments director Kayden Kross writing "Kayden has firmly established herself as one of the most talented creative forces currently working in smut and the joints she’s churning out with her Deeper studio are consistently some of the most expertly crafted films of any hardcore studio anywhere in the world." On the adult review aggregator AdultDVDTalk the film received extremely positive reviews, seeing a 4.6 out of 5 stars on sixteen reviews. In the sites featured review on the film the reviewer stated, "Needless to say, this flick is absolutely a must-see. Even those who aren''t typically inclined toward features will likely marvel at just how good it is. Indeed, there is little doubt that what Kross and Ward are doing as a team right now is several cuts above the competition and, quite frankly, may well be changing and reforming the broader adult landscape...both in terms of quality and public perception."

=== Awards and nominations ===
Year	Ceremony	Award	Recipient(s)	Result
2020	XCritic Awards	Best Actress	Maitland Ward	Won
2020	XCritic Awards	Best Director	Kayden Kross	Won
2021	AVN Awards	Best Three-Way Sex Scene	Gianna Dior, Rob Piper, Scarlit Scandal	Won
2021	AVN Awards	Best Directing - Drama	Kayden Kross	Won
2021	AVN Awards	Best Art Direction	—N/a	Won
2021	AVN Awards	Best Editing	—N/a	Won
2021	AVN Awards	Best Group Sex Scene	Adriana Chechik, Isiah Maxwell, Maitland Ward, Sly Diggler	Nominated
2021	AVN Awards	Best Actress	Maitland Ward	Won
2021	AVN Awards	Best Non-Sex Performance	A.J.	Nominated
2021	AVN Awards	Best Screenplay - Drama	—N/a	Won
2021	AVN Awards	Best Soundtrack	—N/a	Nominated
2021	AVN Awards	Grand Reel	—N/a	Won
2021	AVN Awards	Best Supporting Actress	Adriana Checkik	Nominated
2021	XBIZ Awards	Best Cinematography	—N/a	Won
2021	XBIZ Awards	Best Acting - Lead	Maitland Ward	Won
2021	XBIZ Awards	Feature Movie of the Year	—N/a	Won
2021	XBIZ Awards	Best Acting - Supporting	Adriana Checkik	Nominated
2021	XBIZ Awards	Best Sex Scene - Feature Movie	Gianna Dior, Rob Piper, Scarlit Scandal	Nominated
2021	XBIZ Awards	Best Screenplay	—N/a	Nominated
2021	XBIZ Awards	Best Editing	—N/a	Nominated
2021	XBIZ Awards	Best Sex Scene - Feature Movie	Adriana Checkik, Isiah Maxwell, Maitland Ward, Sly Diggler	Won
2021	XBIZ Awards	Best Music	—N/a	Nominated
