= Adriana Chechik =

American pornographic film actress (born 1991)

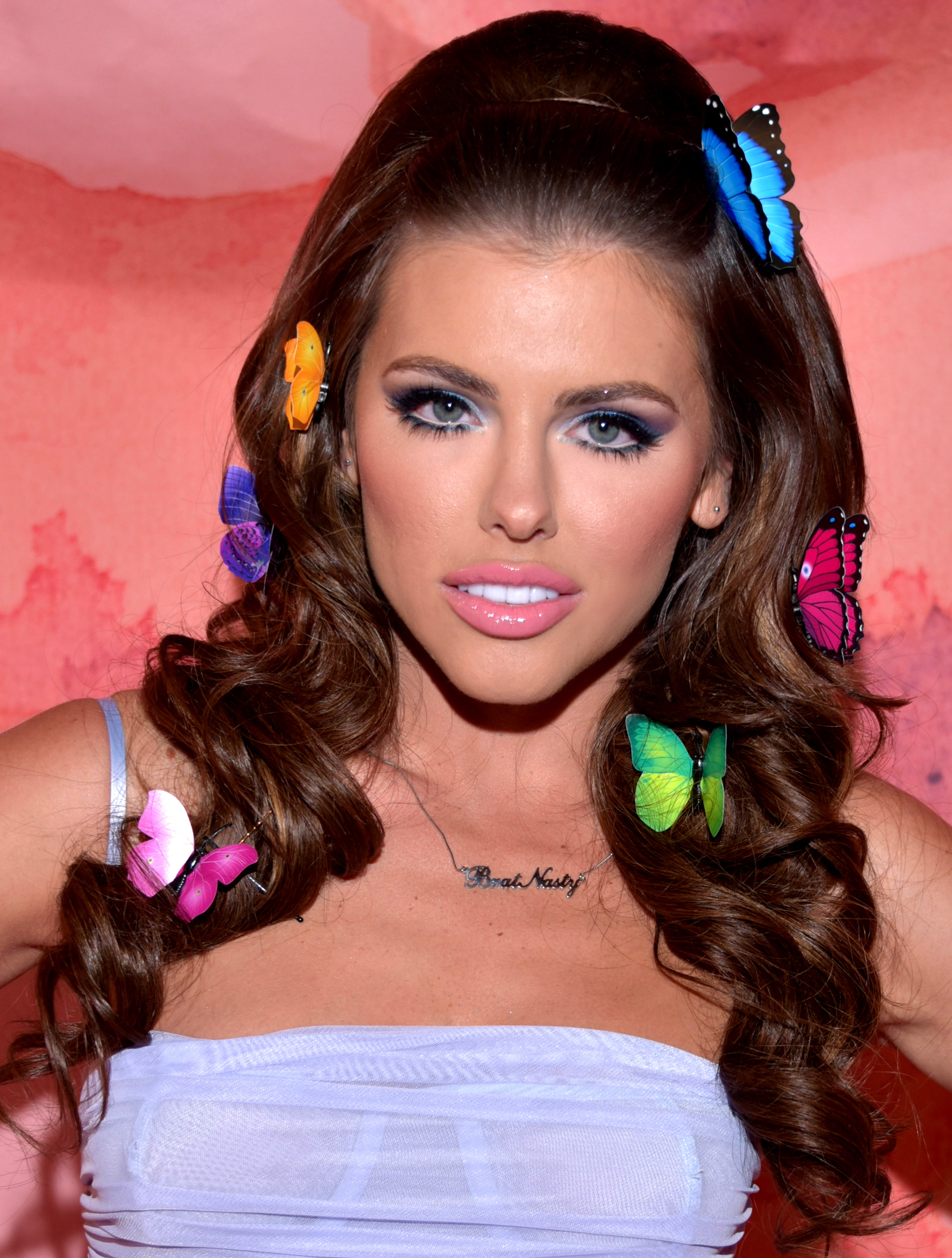
- Chechik in 2019
- Born: November 4, 1991 (age 35)
- Occupations: Pornographic film actress; media personality; Twitch streamer
- Years active: 2013–present
- Height: 5 ft 2 in (1.57 m)
- Website: adrianachechik.com

Adriana Chechik (born November 4, 1991) is an American pornographic film actress. By 2022, she had mostly retired from pornography in favor of video game livestreaming on Twitch. In October 2022, she broke her back when she jumped into a shallow pit of foam cubes at the annual video gaming convention TwitchCon. Chechik documented her recovery following the injury.

== Adult entertainment career ==
Chechik worked as a dancer at Scarlett's Cabaret in Hallandale Beach, Florida, before working in porn. In May 2013, she signed a non-exclusive, one-year contract with Erotique Entertainment. On September 5, 2014, she launched her own website, AdrianaChechik.com, on the Cherry Pimps Network.

Chechik appeared on The Howard Stern Show on August 12, 2014, and was featured in Cosmopolitan magazine the following month. In 2019, she starred in an episode of the soft-core porn series LadyKiller TV, a parody of the Nightmare on Elm Street series directed by Jeremy Spencer. The same year, a Jezebel article on female ejaculation attributed Chechik's success in porn to her "squirting" prowess. In 2022, Indy100 described Chechik as "one of the most famous names in porn".

Maitland Ward recounted in her 2022 book, Rated X: How Porn Liberated Me from Hollywood, that Chechik helped her prepare for her first anal scene in the 2020 porn web series Muse. Both Chechik and Ward received awards for a scene in the series they appeared in together. Chechik has described how her work in the industry has led to various injuries comparable to those received in a sports career, leading her to consider other career options.

== Streaming career and TwitchCon injury ==
By 2022, Chechik had mostly retired from pornography in favor of livestreaming sessions on Twitch. In August 2022, Twitch apologized to Chechik for a ban initially imposed on her shortly before a Fortnite event due to her prior career, and further explained it as having been due to her changing to a more revealing outfit during a streaming session. Chechik revealed that as a streamer, she spent thousands of dollars in donations seeking the attention of fellow streamer Dr Disrespect, of whom she is a fan. By October 2022, Chechik herself had amassed more than 3.8 million followers on Instagram and over 800,000 on Twitch.

While attending TwitchCon on October 10, 2022, Chechik participated in an interactive exhibit hosted by Lenovo Legion and Intel that involved attendees dueling in an arena and landing in a pit of foam cubes. The arena was not padded properly, which caused people to land on concrete and sustain various injuries. Chechik broke her back in two places when landing, and had to undergo surgery to set the fracture with a rod implant. Observers noted that Twitch publicly remained silent on the matter, failing to acknowledge Chechik's injury. According to Chechik, Twitch said nothing to her privately about the incident. The incident led to negative comments directed towards Chechik online. A tweet by esports news organization Dexerto making light of the injury based on Chechik's history was quickly retracted following backlash.

On October 29, it was reported that Chechik had been pregnant when she was taken to the hospital, and that the pregnancy had to be terminated due to her injuries. In a Twitch stream on November 7, Chechik discussed her condition and prospects for recovery. She reported in December that, following her injury, "internet trolls" had initiated a number of swatting incidents against her home, to the point that local law enforcement became familiar with her.

In January 2023, Chechik criticized Twitch streamer Adin Ross after Ross proposed to ban "hot tub" Twitch broadcasts, with Chechik describing Ross as "a man who clout chases after sex workers for views. One of the most disrespectful people I have ever met." Chechik also responded to criticism of her history as an adult performer by posting a picture of eleven awards she has won in the adult film industry. In July 2023, TMZ reported that Chechik was collaborating with a company called Forever Voices AI in the development of an "Adriana Chechik AI Companion", which would provide subscribers with AI-simulated conversations with Chechik using her voice.

In November 2023, Chechik wrote that although she was progressively recovering, she was still in pain from her injury.

In November 2025, during a Q&A story on her instagram, Chechik revealed that she was filming scenes again, after having to go through physical therapy to learn how to have an orgasm again due to her damaged nerves from the accident.

== Awards and nominations ==
List of awards received by Adriana Chechik
Awards and nominations
Award	Won	Nominated
AVN Awards	12	30
NightMoves Awards	9	3
XBIZ Awards	3	14
XRCO Awards	6	11
Doppio Senso Night Awards	1	–
Pornhub Awards	4	–
- Total number of wins and nominations
Totals	35	58

AVN Awards
Year	Result	Award	Film
2014	Nominated	Best Boy/Girl Sex Scene (with Bruce Venture)	The Innocence of Youth 5
2015	Won	Best Anal Sex Scene (with Manuel Ferrara)	Internal Damnation 8
2015	Nominated	Best Girl/Girl Sex Scene (with Dana DeArmond)	A Mother Daughter Thing
2015	Nominated	Best Group Sex Scene (with Jordan Ash, Karlo Karrera, Ramón Nomar and Tommy Pistol)	This Is My First... A Gang Bang Movie
2015	Nominated	Best Solo/Tease Performance	I Love Big Toys 69
2015	Nominated	Best Three-Way Sex Scene – Girl/Girl/Boy (with Allie Haze and Manuel Ferrara)	Allie
2015	Nominated	Female Performer of the Year	—N/a
2015	Won	Most Outrageous Sex Scene (with Erik Everhard, James Deen and Mick Blue)	Gangbang Me
2016	Nominated	Best Actress	The Turning
2016	Nominated	Best All-Girl Group Sex Scene (with Carter Cruise, Jelena Jensen and Tara Morgan)	The Turning
2016	Nominated	Best Anal Sex Scene (with Lexington Steele)	Brunettes Go Black
2016	Nominated	Best Group Sex Scene (with Prince Yahshua, Rico Strong and Sean Michaels)	Adriana's a Slut
2016	Nominated	Best Three-Way Sex Scene – Girl/Girl/Boy (with Chris Strokes and Megan Rain)	Adriana's a Slut
2016	Nominated	Best Group Sex Scene (with Anikka Albrite, Carter Cruise, Dahlia Sky, Mick Blue and Skin Diamond)	Mick Blue Is One Lucky Bastard
2016	Nominated	Best Group Sex Scene (with Aidra Fox, Dani Daniels, Erik Everhard, James Deen, Karlee Grey, Mick Blue and Peta Jensen)	Orgy Masters 7
2016	Nominated	Best Oral Sex Scene (with Karmen Karma)	Adriana Chechik & Karmen Karma's Through the Jeans BJ
2016	Won	Best Transsexual Sex Scene (with Vixxen Goddess)	TS Playground 21
2016	Nominated	Female Performer of the Year	—N/a
2017
2017	Nominated	Best Anal Sex Scene (with Mick Blue)	Gape Tryouts
2017	Nominated	Best Double Penetration Sex Scene (with John Strong, Mick Blue and Toni Ribas)	Adriana Chechik: The Ultimate Slut
2017	Nominated	Best Group Sex Scene (with Alex Jones, Chris Cock, Darwin Slimpoke, Jake Jace, Isiah Maxwell, Markus Dupree, Moe Johnson and Ricky Johnson)	Adriana Chechik: The Ultimate Slut
2017	Won	Best Oral Sex Scene (with Alex Jones, Chris Cock, Darwin Slimpoke, Jake Jace, Isiah Maxwell, Markus Dupree, Moe Johnson and Ricky Johnson)	Adriana Chechik: The Ultimate Slut
2017	Nominated	Best Supporting Actress	Color Blind
2017	Nominated	Best Three-Way Sex Scene – Girl/Girl/Boy (with Mick Blue and Veronica Rodriguez)	Veronica Rodriguez: Latina Squirt Goddess
2017	Won	Female Performer of the Year	—N/a
2017	Won	Most Outrageous Sex Scene (with Holly Hendrix and Markus Dupree)	Holly Hendrix's Anal Experience
2018
2018	Nominated	Female Performer of the Year	—N/a
2018	Nominated	Best Star Showcase	Adriana Chechik Is the Squirt Queen
2018	Nominated	Best Anal Sex Scene (with James Deen)	Adriana Chechik Is the Extreme Anal Queen
2018	Won	Best Transsexual Sex Scene (with Aubrey Kate)	Adriana Chechik Is the Squirt Queen
2018	Won	Best Virtual Reality Sex Scene (with Megan Rain, Arya Fae and Tommy Gunn)	Zombie Slayers
2019	Nominated	Best Actress	Star Wars: The Last Temptation - A Digital Playground XXX Parody
2019	Nominated	Best Group Sex Scene (with Jennifer White, Katrina Jade, Aaliyah Love, Tiffany Watson, Mr Pete, Zack Wild, Hans and Rion King)	Fuck Club
2020	Won	Best Oral Sex Scene (with Alex Jones)	Swallowed 29
2021	Nominated	Best Supporting Actress	Muse
2021	Won	Best Gangbang Scene (with John Strong, Rob Piper, Markus Dupree, Alex Jones, Eddie Jaye and Scotty P.)	Adriana Chechik's Extreme Gangbang
2021	Won	Best Transgender Group Sex Scene (with Natalie Mars and Khloe Kay)	Transfixed 6
2026	Won	Favorite Porn Star Creator	—N/a
2027	Nominated	Best Blowbang Scene	Adriana Chechik Comeback Blowbang
2027	Nominated	Best Foursome/Orgy Scene	Dirty Game – Scene 6
2027	Nominated	Best Leading Actress	Dirty Game
2027	Nominated	Best VR One-on-One Sex Scene	Diamond Devotion

NightMoves Awards
Year	Result	Award
2015	Won	Best Body (Editor's Choice)
2016	Won	Best Female Performer (Fans' Choice)
2017	Won	Best Female Performer (Fans' Choice)
2017	Won	Best Adult Star Feature Dancer (Fans' Choice)
2018	Won	Best Adult Star Feature Dancer (Fans' Choice)
2018	Won	Hall of Fame
2019	Won	Best Female Performer (Fans' Choice)
2020	Won	Best Female Performer (Fans' Choice)
2021	Won	Best Female Performer (Fans' Choice)

XBIZ Awards
Year	Result	Award	Film
2014	Nominated	Best New Starlet	—N/a
2014	Nominated	Best Scene – Parody Release (with Anthony Rosano, Gaia and Talon)	Grease XXX: A Parody
2015	Nominated	Female Performer of the Year	—N/a
2015	Won	Best Scene – Non-Feature Release (with Criss Strokes, Erik Everhard, James Deen, John Strong and Mick Blue)	Gangbang Me
2015	Nominated	Best Scene – All-Girl (with Belle Noire)	Paint
2016	Nominated	Female Performer of the Year	—N/a
2016	Nominated	Best Actress – All-Girl Release	The Turning
2016	Nominated	Best Sex Scene – All-Sex Release (with Chris Strokes and Megan Rain)	Adriana's a Slut
2016	Nominated	Best Sex Scene – All-Girl (with Abella Danger, Carter Cruise and Phoenix Marie)	Buttslammers
2016	Nominated	Best Sex Scene – All-Girl (with Karmen Karma)	Karma's a Bitch
2017	Nominated	Female Performer of the Year	—N/a
2017	Nominated	Performer Showcase of the Year	Adriana Chechik: The Ultimate Slut
2017	Nominated	Best Sex Scene – Virtual Reality (with Arya Fae and Megan Rain)	Zombie Slayers
2017	Nominated	Best Supporting Actress	Color Blind
2019	Won	Best Scene – Vignette Release (with Tori Black and Johnny Sins)	After Dark
2021	Won	Best Scene – Feature Movie (with Isiah Maxwell, Maitland Ward and Sly Diggler)	Muse

XRCO Awards
Year	Result	Award
2014	Nominated	Cream Dream
2015	Nominated	Female Performer of the Year
2015	Won	Orgasmic Analist
2015	Won	Superslut
2016	Won	Superslut
2016	Won	Female Performer of the Year
2017	Won	Female Performer of the Year
2017	Nominated	Orgasmic Analist
2017	Nominated	Orgasmic Analist
2019	Won	Superslut

Doppio Senso Night Awards
Year	Result	Award
2016	Won	International Female Performer of the Year

Pornhub Awards
Year	Result	Award
2018	Won	Top DP Performer
2019	Won	Best Snapchat
2020	Won	Top DP Performer
2022	Won	Top DP Performer
