= Gianna Dior =

American pornographic film actress and model (born 1997)

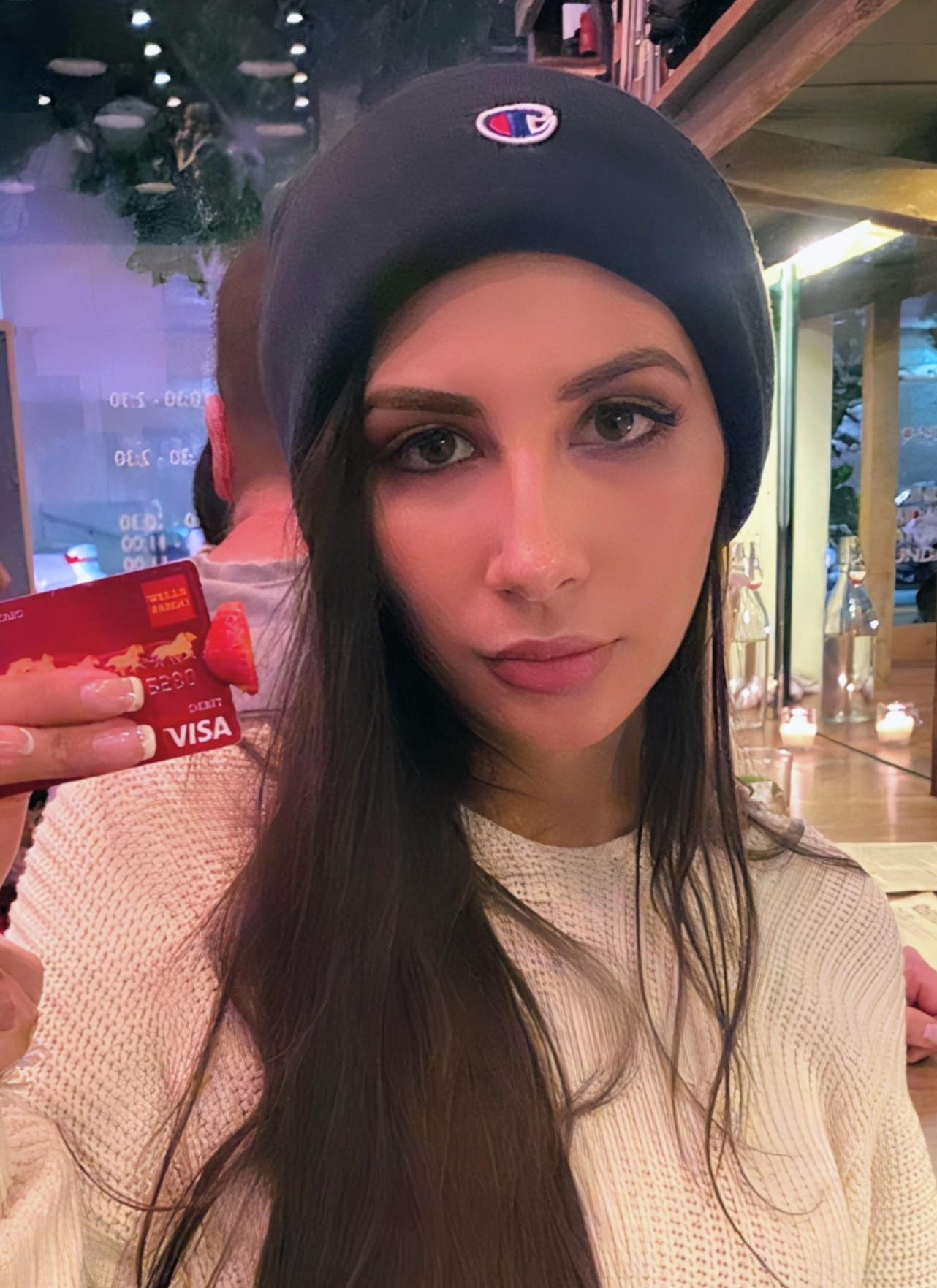
- Dior in 2019
- Born: 1997 (age 28–29)
- Education: Auburn University
- Occupations: Pornographic film actress; erotic photography model
- Years active: 2018–present

Gianna Dior (born 1997) is an American pornographic film actress and erotic photography model. She is the winner of multiple awards, including the 2020 AVN Award for Best New Starlet and the 2022 AVN Award for Female Performer of the Year.

== Early life and education ==
Gianna Dior grew up in a small town near Auburn, Alabama. She is of Italian and Native American descent. Both of her parents were in the military. Dior attended Auburn University, where she studied psychology. While attending university, she worked part-time as a sushi restaurant waitress as well as a receptionist at an eye clinic in Auburn, Alabama.

== Career ==
After noticing Dior on Tinder, a porn agent in Miami approached her to shoot adult scenes. Following that, she made her debut at the age of 21 in May 2018. Her stage name, Gianna Dior, was chosen by her first agent who wanted to find something that recalled her Italian origins. In September 2018, she was named as the Penthouse Pet of the Month. In 2019, Dior became the Penthouse Pet of the Year.

In 2020, Dior rose to industry prominence by winning the Best New Starlet Award at both the AVN and XRCO Awards. She also won the award for Best Boy/Girl sex scene with Mick Blue. This feat of winning the New Starlet Award and award for Best Boy/Girl sex scene was last achieved by Jenna Jameson in 1996. The same year, she did her first anal sex scene for Evil Angel with Markus Dupree. In 2022, at the AVN Awards she was nominated in 6 different awards including Hottest Girl/Girl Scene with fellow performer Lacey Lennon Hottest Boy/Girl Creator collab with 2 Drops and ultimately won four of them, including Female Performer of the Year, becoming the third actress ever to win the Best Performer Award after winning the Best New Starlet Award.

In a breakthrough role, Gianna Dior made her debut as a film director in May 2024 for Vixen Media Group leading the production behind a scene featuring Liz Jordan and Jason Luv. She previously starred as an actress for the group, appearing in over 20 films.

== Personal life ==
In March 2021, Dior became partially paralyzed due to rejection of vitamin B12 by her body, which caused damage to her spinal cord. After one month of treatment and rehabilitation, she recuperated.

In October 2021, fellow pornographic actress Emily Willis filed a $5M defamation lawsuit against Dior, as well as Adria Rae, and 10 other unnamed defendants over Twitter posts that they had made. The lawsuit was dismissed without prejudice in 2025, due to no one appearing on the incapacitated Willis' behalf.

== Awards ==
List of accolades received by Gianna Dior
Awards
Award	Won
AVN Awards	12
XBIZ Awards	1
Penthouse	2
XRCO Awards	2
- Total number of wins
Totals	17

Year	Event	Award	Film
2018	Penthouse	September Pet of the Month	—N/a
2019	Penthouse	Penthouse Pet of the Year	—N/a
2020	AVN Award	Best New Starlet	—N/a
2020	AVN Award	Best Boy/Girl Sex Scene (with Mick Blue)	Unlocked
2020	XRCO Award	Best New Starlet	—N/a
2021	AVN Award	Best Oral Sex Scene	Gianna Dior: Blowjob With Eye Contact
2021	AVN Award	Best Three-Way Sex Scene – B/B/G (with Scarlit Scandal & Rob Piper)	Muse
2022	AVN Award	Female Performer of the Year	—N/a
2022	AVN Award	Best Anal Sex Scene (with Mick Blue)	Psychosexual
2022	AVN Award	Best Boy/Girl Sex Scene (with Troy Francisco)	Psychosexual
2022	AVN Award	Best Tag-Team Sex Scene (with Jax Slayher & Rob Piper)	Psychosexual
2022	XBIZ Award	Performer Showcase of the Year	Psychosexual
2022	XRCO Award	Female Performer of the Year (tied with Emily Willis)	—N/a
2023	AVN Award	Best Girl-Girl Sex Scene (with Vanna Bardot)	Heat Wave
2023	AVN Award	Best All-Girl Group Sex Scene (with Jill Kassidy & Natalia Nix)	Close Up
2023	AVN Award	Best Tag-Team Sex Scene (with Mick Blue & Steve Holmes)	Gianna 4 You
2024	AVN Award	Best Foursome/Orgy Scene (with Kylie Rocket, Richard Mann, & Dwayne Fox)	Blacked Raw V70, All for Us

1970s	Evelyn Treacher	Stephanie McLean	Tina McDowall	Patricia Barrett	Avril Lund
1970s	Anneka Di Lorenzo	Laura Bennett Doone	Victoria Lynn Johnson	Dominique Maure	Cheryl Rixon
1980s	Isabella Ardigo	Danielle Deneux	Corinne Alphen	Sheila Kennedy	Linda Kenton
1980s	None	Cody Carmack	Mindy Farrar	Patty Mullen	Ginger Miller
1990s	Stephanie Page	Simone Brigitte	Jisel	Julie Strain	Sasha Vinni
1990s	Gina LaMarca	Andi Sue Irwin	Elizabeth Ann Hilden	Paige Summers	Nikie St. Gilles
2000s	Juliet Cariaga	Zdeňka Podkapová	Megan Mason	Sunny Leone	Victoria Zdrok
2000s	Martina Warren	Jamie Lynn	Heather Vandeven	Erica Ellyson	Taya Parker
2010s	Taylor Vixen	Nikki Benz	Jenna Rose	Nicole Aniston	Lexi Belle
2010s	Layla Sin	Kenna James	Jenna Sativa	Gina Valentina	Gianna Dior
2020s	Lacy Lennon	Kenzie Anne	Amber Marie	Tahlia Paris	Renee Olstead
2020s	Kassie Wallis	-	-	-	-
