= Perfect (2018 film) =

2018 American science fiction thriller film

- Theatrical release poster
- Directed by: Eddie Alcazar
- Screenplay by: Ted Kupper
- Story by: Eddie Alcazar; Ted Kupper
- Produced by: Eddie Alcazar; Javier Lovato
- Starring: Garrett Wareing; Courtney Eaton; Tao Okamoto; Maurice Compte; Abbie Cornish
- Cinematography: Matthias Koenigswieser
- Edited by: Gardner Gould
- Music by: Flying Lotus
- Production company: Brainfeeder Films
- Distributed by: Breaker; SingularDTV
- Release dates: March 11, 2018 (SWSW); May 17, 2019 (United States)
- Running time: 85 minutes
- Country: United States
- Language: English

Perfect is a 2018 American science fiction thriller film directed by Eddie Alcazar in his feature length debut. The film stars Garrett Wareing as a young man who is sent to a clinic in hopes of relieving his mental troubles by altering his characteristics.

The supporting cast includes Courtney Eaton, Tao Okamoto, Maurice Compte, and Abbie Cornish. Steven Soderbergh and Flying Lotus are among the executive producers, with the latter also composing the music. Alcazar and Lotus' company Brainfeeder Films produced the film.

Perfect had its premiere at South by Southwest on March 11, 2018. It was released in the United States on May 17, 2019. The film received negative reviews from critics.

== Plot ==
A young man finds the corpse of his murdered girlfriend lying in the bed next to him. Having received a call from him, his mother takes him to a genetic-engineering clinic, where the patients transform their bodies and minds.

== Cast ==
- Garrett Wareing as Vessel 13
- Courtney Eaton as Sarah
- Tao Okamoto as Ozawa
- Maurice Compte as Dr. Price
- Abbie Cornish as Mother
- Martin Sensmeier as The Harvester
- Rainey Qualley as Perl
- Leonardo Nam as Haskell

== Production ==
The film's working title was Puberty. The project was unveiled by Brainfeeder Films at the 2016 American Film Market. Part of the filming took place at the Sheats–Goldstein Residence in California. Flying Lotus wrote the score for the film.

The onscreen writing credits present Ted Kupper with "screenplay by", and Eddie Alcazar and Kupper with "story by". However, the Writers Guild of America finalized the writing credits in 2023, five years after the film's release, and although the "screenplay by" credit remains the same, the "story by" credit is absent and is replaced with a "based on" credit for Alcazar alone ("Based on a Story by Eddie Alcazar").

== Release ==
The film had its premiere at South by Southwest on March 11, 2018. SingularDTV subsequently acquired the worldwide rights to the film. It was released theatrically in the United States on May 17, 2019. It was released through video on demand on Breaker on June 21, 2019. In Scandinavia, the film was released on DVD and Blu-ray by Nonstop Entertainment in January 2020.

== Reception ==
On Rotten Tomatoes, the film received an approval rating of 21% based on 14 reviews, with an average rating of 3.6/10. On Metacritic, the film had a weighted average score of 36 out of 100, based on reviews from 7 critics, indicating "generally unfavorable reviews".

Peter Sobczynski of RogerEbert.com gave the film 2 out of 4 stars. Sobczynski wrote "Eddie Alcazar's movie is ambitious enough, but it's the work of a would-be visionary without any clear vision." John DeFore of The Hollywood Reporter wrote: "While some will embrace the shards as a Shane Carruth-like brain-teaser, the movie is ultimately too reflective of its genetically-engineered subjects — soulless under an entrancing veneer."

Amy Nicholson of Variety commented that Eddie Alcazar and Flying Lotus are "fixated on body horror, vanity, breaking good-taste boundaries, and blurring the lines between feature film, music video, and art installation." Chuck Bowen of Slant Magazine gave the film 1 out of 4 stars, writing, "Eddie Alcazar's Perfect is the sort of purposefully inscrutable, wandering, disconnected, symbolic, and highly precious mood bath that you'll either adore or loathe." Jeff Ewing of Forbes called it "surreal and complex, with the natural beauty of the surroundings alternating with body horror and psychedelic interludes."
