= Pasha Petkuns =

Latvian freerunner (born 1992)

- Born: Pavel Petkuns; 29 September 1992 (age 34); Daugavpils, Latvia
- Occupations: Professional freerunner; parkour athlete; stuntman; content creator
- Years active: 2009–present
- Height: 5 ft 5 in (1.65 m)
- Spouse: Riley Reid
- Children: 1
- Website: pashapetkuns.com

Pavel "Pasha" Petkuns (born 29 September 1992) is a Latvian freerunning and parkour athlete who is sponsored by Red Bull.

== Early and personal life ==
Petkuns was born in Daugavpils, Latvia. He stated his entrance into parkour began in 2006, after watching a YouTube video by Oleg Vorslav. He was the Red Bull Art of Motion champion in 2011, 2012, and 2013.

He is married to American pornographic actress Riley Reid. They first met in 2020, and became engaged in 2021. They have one child together, a daughter, who he cited as a major motivation in his workout routines.

== Career ==
As a part of his work for Red Bull, Petkuns participated in a 'life-size pinball', where he would parkour around a series of obstacles designed like a pinball machine.

=== Technique ===
Petkuns's technique in parkour has been praised for its "...athleticism, with a playful, artistic edge."
