= Eddie Alcazar =

American film director, screenwriter

- Alcazar in a self-portrait
- Born: Albuquerque, New Mexico
- Education: Academy of Art University
- Occupations: Filmmaker, game designer
- Years active: 2004-present
- Notable work: Perfect; The Vandal

Eddie Alcazar is an American film director, screenwriter, producer, and game designer.

== Career ==
Alcazar was raised in Albuquerque, New Mexico, by a Bolivia single mother.

In the early 2000s he attended the Academy of Art University, after winning a scholarship. Here he studied visual effects and animation film theory. In 2004 he started working for the game design division at Electronic Arts. A year and a half later he founded his company Alcazar Entertainment, working as a designer and 3D modeler for commercials and videogames. The company was sold in 2007, when he started working on the script of the feature length 0000. The plot addresses topics such as the relationship between philosophy, technology and human nature. The teaser trailer of 0000 was released in late March 2011 on both YouTube and Vimeo, but the project is, in 2022, still under development, and the official website dedicated to it has expired in 2019.

In 2013 he directed the documentary Tapia, produced by 50 Cent for HBO, based on the life of the world champion boxer Johnny Tapia, who died in 2012. The movie won "Best Documentary" prize at Julien Dubuque International Film Festival, Santa Fe Independent Film Festival and XicanIndie Film Festival. He then started working on commercial shoots.

In 2015, Alcazar started his collaboration with American music producer Flying Lotus. The two partnered founding Brainfeeder Films, an independent film finance and production company, mainly focused on supporting experimental projects and emerging artists. The first work produced by the company was the surreal sci-fi short film FUCKKKYOUUU, shot in 16 mm, which premiered at Sundance in 2015. Alcazar worked on the direction and the screenplay, while Flying Lotus worked on the score and the sound design. Although being narratively ambiguous and cryptic, the artistic duo released an official synopsis for the short, it being the story of a girl who travels through time to connect with her past self.

The same work division appeared in Alcazar's first released feature length Perfect, which premiered in 2018 at South by Southwest Film Festival and was produced by Steven Soderbergh. The plot of the film follows the story of a boy who is sent by his mother to a special clinic, where he will have to follow a rehabilitation program that will make him become a perfect human being. The movie received mostly negative reviews from critics, scoring 21% of appreciation on Rotten Tomatoes. Most critics who rated the movie negatively pointed out how Alcazar's focused only on pure formalistic experimentation, lacking a clear and coherent theme for the plot.

In 2017, Alcazar participated as a producer in the making of Flying Lotus' first feature-length film, Kuso. That same year saw the release of the Thundercat album Drunk, for which Alcazar photographed the front cover image.

Between 2020 and 2021, Alcazar worked on the short film The Vandal, starring Bill Duke as the main character. Featuring Darren Aronofsky as the main executive producer, the short premiered at Cannes. The plot of the short, set in mid-20th century, follows the story of Harold, a man who has to deal with his wife's death right after going through a lobotomy. To convey the effect of the man's slow spiraling into mental insanity, Alcazar created a new stop-motion technique, which he called "Metascope", that blends animation and live action, making the characters appear more realistic as the camera gets closer to them.

In September 2021, Alcazar and Soderbergh announced they were going to reteam for a new project, the thriller feature length Divinity. The film was to include the use of Metascope, and starred Bella Thorne and Moisés Arias among the main cast. The musical score was composed by Cypress Hill' member DJ Muggs.

On July 24, 2025, his pilot for an animated series, Bullet Time, debuted at San Diego Comic Con. Eric Bauza, known for voicing Looney Tunes characters, starred as the titular character Bullet, and the animation was directed by Bob Jaques, storyboards by Kelly Armstrong, Jaques wife, and additional backgrounds by Bill Wray.

== Works ==
=== Filmography ===
- Tapia (2013)
- FUCKKKYOUUU (2015)
- Kuso (2017) - as producer
- Perfect (2018)
- The Vandal (2021)
- Divinity (2023)
- Red Terror (2025) - music video
- Bullet Time - animated pilot

=== Game credits ===
- Medal of Honor: Allied Assault - Breakthrough (2003)
- Medal of Honor: Pacific Assault (2004)
- Tennis Titans (2005)
- Neverwinter Nights 2 (2006)

== See also ==
- Flying Lotus
- Steven Soderbergh
- Darren Aronofsky
- Experimental film

== Bibliography ==
- Le Grice, Malcolm (2019). Experimental Cinema in the Digital Age. Bloomsbury Publishing. ISBN 9781838715601.
- Sheehan, Rebecca A. (2020). American Avant-Garde Cinema's Philosophy of the In-Between. Oxford University Press. ISBN 9780190949723.
