= Divinity (film) =

2023 film by Eddie Alcazar

- Theatrical release poster
- Directed by: Eddie Alcazar
- Written by: Eddie Alcazar
- Produced by: Eddie Alcazar; Javier Lovato; Raphael Gindre; Johnny Starke
- Starring: Stephen Dorff; Moises Arias; Jason Genao; Karrueche Tran; Michael O'Hearn; Emily Willis; Scott Bakula; Bella Thorne
- Cinematography: Danny Hiele
- Edited by: Steve Forner; Kevin Greutert
- Music by: DJ Muggs; Dean Hurley
- Production company: Sumerian
- Distributed by: Utopia
- Release dates: January 21, 2023 (Sundance); October 14, 2023 (United States)
- Running time: 88 minutes
- Country: United States
- Language: English
- Box office: $102,891

Divinity is a 2023 American science fiction film written and directed by Eddie Alcazar in his directorial debut, and starring Stephen Dorff, Moises Arias, Jason Genao, Karrueche Tran, Michael O'Hearn, Emily Willis, Scott Bakula, and Bella Thorne.

Steven Soderbergh announced the film in September 2021, joining as an executive producer. The film began production in the same month and continued till late-2022 as a course of a seven-phase shooting schedule with intermittent breaks, instead of a traditional film production process. Much of the filming emphasized use on film stocks and shot entirely in black-and-white reversal formats, rarely used in mainstream filmmaking.

The film had its premiere at Sundance Film Festival on January 21, 2023, and was released theatrically in the United States on October 14, 2023. It received generally positive reviews for Alcazar's direction, screenplay and the science fiction elements, but criticized for the grotesque nature.

== Premise ==
Set in an otherworldly human existence, scientist Sterling Pierce dedicated his life to the quest for immortality, slowly creating the building blocks of a groundbreaking serum named "Divinity". Jaxxon Pierce, his son, now controls and manufactures his father's once-benevolent dream into a malicious nightmare.

== Cast ==
- Stephen Dorff as Jaxxon Pierce
- Moises Arias and Jason Genao as Stars
- Karrueche Tran as Nikita
- Michael O'Hearn as Rip
- Emily Willis as Lynx
- Scott Bakula as Sterling Pierce
- Bella Thorne as Ziva
- Caylee Cowan as Felisha Flexi

== Production ==
Steven Soderbergh and Eddie Alcazar announced in September 2021 that they were collaborating on a new film with Alcazar directing and Soderbergh producing, and Soderbergh serving as executive producer. In April 2022, Scott Bakula and Bella Thorne joined the cast, and DJ Muggs would compose the music. The film was made without a script, according to Alcazar: "There is no script for this film, so I was trusted with the virtue of doing my own thing. And I started drawing and sketching ideas, and that's pretty much how it all came about."

Instead of the traditional pre-production, production and post-production process, Alcazar attempted to do everything all at once, writing and editing through a series of seven different shoots over a year. During the breaks, Alcazar shot a portion of the film, edited for 2–3 months and shot again, while also rewriting the script and begin production with the actors to implement the changes. Even in the pre-production stages, Alcazar denied storyboarding sequences, to leave it open for fresh and new ideas so that filmmaking becomes a fully collaborative and organic process. Due to this, the initial shoot has around 50 crew members but throughout each shooting process, the crew significantly got smaller and smaller until five of the crew were present in shooting one of the scenes.

Alcazar attempted to use film stock for shooting the film in black-and-white formats, despite the logistical challenges as use of film stocks in feature films were quite obsolete. Having acquired the Vision2 and Vision3 stocks from Kodak, he and cinematographer Danny Hiele shot the entire film on 16mm black-and-white reversal, which was rarely used and generated extremely high contrast. Hiele said, "It's a tricky stock to use because you need a lot of light [...] and you don't have a lot of latitude. You have to be very precise in how you expose the film." Alcazar also used 8mm stocks for few of the sequences. They also used a wide-angle lens equivalent to 24mm in 35mm photography, to bring a visual style that provided the depth in acting and contextualize them within the locations, allowing to feel the environment as a character. Hiele also chose to light locations and sets rather than specific shots or frames, giving the actors the freedom to explore the surroundings.

For filming the epic climatic action sequence, Alcazar was initially skeptic due to monetary constraints and the reduced number of crew being unable to film the scene at a massive scale. Hence, he used the stop motion technique for the extended fight scene. Alcazar had to plan that scene because he could not do multiple takes in stop motion. To make it more efficient, he used the Metascope concept which he did in The Vandal. Alcazar explained the process adding:

"we filled in those shots with live action stuff [shot on] virtual sets with LED walls. All the super wides were miniatures, then you go into stop motion on most of the medium action shots. Then in the closeups, when actors speak or show emotion, that's all shot on 16mm with the LED walls in the background that we pulled from the miniatures. It's pretty much the LED walls enlarging these small sets so you feel like you're inside them."

== Release ==
Divinity had its premiere at Sundance Film Festival on January 21, 2023, followed by an international premiere at the Taormina Film Festival on June 29, 2023.

In March 2023, Utopia and Sumerian acquired worldwide distribution rights to the film, later setting it for a theatrical release in the United States on October 14, 2023. The film utilized a platform release starting in New York, followed by Los Angeles on October 20, and the wide release began on November 3. The film received an SAG-AFTRA interim agreement to allow cast members to promote the theatrical release during the 2023 SAG-AFTRA strike.

== Reception ==
=== Critical response ===
On the review aggregator website Rotten Tomatoes, 57% of 44 critics' reviews are positive, with an average rating of 6.30/10. Metacritic, which uses a weighted average, assigned the film a score of 61 out of 100, based on 12 critics, indicating "generally favorable" reviews.

Jeannette Catsoulis, writing for New York Times, described the film as, "an unintentionally comical sci-fi diatribe obsessed with beautiful bodies, bickering brothers and biblical symbolism". She continued, "the occasionally arresting visuals, though, are repeatedly undercut by dumb dialogue and often atrocious acting, the whole experienced through a wall of throbbing, squawking sound. This is not the movie to see if you are nursing a hangover". Jacob Oller, writing for Paste, described it as "a little like a self-important Barbarella, full of half-hearted titillation and taking place in that indistinguishable gray area between a moonbase and a Hollywood sex dungeon", while Nadir Samara, writing for Screen Rant, had a more positive review, praising the visual style, casting, and world-building. Christian Zilko of IndieWire wrote "The film's overarching vision manages to split the difference between the simplistic rules of an old monster movie and the endlessly complicated bioethics debates you can find in Silicon Valley on a daily basis. It often feels as if we're looking into a world that began as a carefully manufactured setting for a 1950s Hollywood movie, but has evolved at the same rate as the real world and now exists as a parallel version of our future. But none of Alcazar's myriad flourishes overshadow the film's most troubling theme: no matter how much the world changes, we'll never stop being terrified to leave it."

Dennis Harvey of Variety wrote "Rather like the results generated by its titular substance, this movie has looks to die for, but whatever is on its mind feels at once obscure and unappealing." Siddhant Adlakha of IGN wrote "A super-charged genre throwback that obscures its meaning but has an alluring visual texture, Divinity is completely unique in its conception of sci-fi dystopia, for better and for worse. When a mysterious pair of brothers unleashes their supernatural powers on the rich inventor of an immortality serum, all hell breaks loose, taking the form of spiritual revelry at the end of the world." Howard Waldstein of Comic Book Resources wrote "Divinity might lack the necessary anchoring for some audiences, but it's well worth checking out. Inspiration can be found everywhere; sometimes, it takes some cinematic jostling to dislodge long-held beliefs. In a sea of sameness, it's nice to know that filmmakers are still taking huge swings with little regard for how it'll all pan out." Carlos Aguilar of Los Angeles Times wrote "Alcazar argues in his sumptuous if convoluted tale, comes from its finite timeline."

Dais Johnston of Inverse wrote "this experimental movie will be a great time for the sliver of the audience who can look through the superficial layers to mine some kind of deeper meaning. But any story that Divinity is trying to communicate is only buried beneath the film's splashy stylings." Chase Hutchinson of Collider wrote "Even as it may not rise to the level of other stunning science fiction visions from this year, there is still so much to appreciate in every single moment of Alcazar's latest. It's an experience you'll only wish you could inject right into your veins even as it may end up leaving your head spinning and possibly painfully stretching from what you just witnessed." Nick Schager of The Daily Beast wrote "It may be a calling card venture for Alcazar, but it's an impressive one, and portends potentially big, and chillingly unhinged, things for his own cinematic future." Richard Whittaker of The Austin Chronicle wrote "For a movie about our relationship with our bodies, there's surprisingly little intellectual meat on its pretentious bones."

=== Accolades ===
Award	Date of ceremony	Category	Recipient(s)	Result	Ref.
Golden Trailer Awards	May 30, 2024	Best Motion/Title Graphics	Divinity	Nominated	
Nashville Film Festival	October 4, 2023	Best Graveyard Shift Feature	Eddie Alcazar	Nominated	
Sitges Film Festival	October 15, 2023	Best Motion Picture	Eddie Alcazar	Nominated	
Sundance Film Festival	January 29, 2023	Next Innovator Award	Eddie Alcazar	Nominated	
