= Dish Dogs =

1998 film by Robert Kubilos

- DVD cover.
- Directed by: Robert Kubilos
- Written by: Nathan Ives; Ashley Scott Meyers
- Produced by: Michael A. Candela; Richard Mann
- Starring: Shannon Elizabeth; Sean Astin; Matthew Lillard; Brian Dennehy
- Cinematography: Mark Vicente
- Edited by: Carol Oblath
- Music by: Herman Beeftink
- Production company: 7.23 Productions
- Distributed by: Flashpoint; Shoreline Entertainment (International); Quiver Distribution (United States via The Neon Screen)
- Release date: 2000
- Running time: 95 minutes
- Country: United States
- Language: English

Dish Dogs is a 2000 American romantic comedy film. It stars Sean Astin and Matthew Lillard and was directed by Robert Kubilos. The film is about the relationship between two friends and when they find love they must both go their separate ways. It was produced in 1998, but was released 2 years later.

== Cast ==
- Sean Astin as Morgan
- Matthew Lillard as Jason
- Brian Dennehy as Frost
- Shannon Elizabeth as Anne
- Maitland Ward as Molly
- Richard Moll as Dewitt
- Steven Martini as David (credited as Steve Martini)
- David Harris as Shane
- E.J. Callahan as Earl
- Steve Franken as Pastor
- Marcelo Tubert as Roberto
- George Gray as Aaron
- Sam Shamshak as Dean Berkowitz
- Herschel Sparber as E.J.
- Brad Braeden as Troy
- Lorissa McComas as Susan
- Kimber West as Bridget
- Jamie Anderson as Tiffany
- Claudia Pichardo as Karen
- Sonya Eddy as Outback Waitress
- Kelly Allee as Leggy Waitress (credited as Sean LaSure)
- Catherine Anderson as Baby Doll Dancer
- Shawna Anderson as Baby Doll Dancer
- Jamaica Charley as Baby Doll Dancer
- C.C. Costigan as Baby Doll Dancer (credited as Katie Colburn)
- Diva as Baby Doll Dancer
- Tamela Hulett as Baby Doll Dancer
- Chona Jason as Baby Doll Dancer
- Linda O'Neil as Baby Doll Dancer
- Tracy Rasmussen as Baby Doll Dancer
- Chanel Ryan as Baby Doll Dancer
- Shannon Frank as Cocktail Waitress (uncredited)
- Leah Jediny as Sexy Waitress (uncredited)
- Richard Moll as Dewitt, The Strip Club Owner (uncredited)

== Reception ==
Nathan Rabin of The A.V. Club gave the film a negative review and wrote: "Funny only when it attempts to be serious [...] Dish Dogs should, but sadly won't, kill off the angst-ridden Gen-X comedy once and for all."

Godfrey Cheshire of Variety called the film "lightweight but agreeable" and predicted it would find an audience when released on video.
