= Jax Slayher =

American pornographic actor

- Born: United States
- Occupations: Pornographic actor; director
- Years active: 2013 - present
- Website: jaxslayher.com

Jax Slayher is an American pornographic film actor and director.

== Stage name ==
Slayher has explained his porn stage name, "Like, I just slayed her. Just slayed the pussy and just demolished it. You know, destroyed it."

== Media ==
Slayher began his adult acting career in 2013 and has frequently worked with Jules Jordan Video, Bang Bros., XEmpire and Vixen Media Group. Slayher has been described as both a dense and gentle figure. He primarily performs in interracial pornography with white women.

He has also made claims that eating watermelon increases the semen in his body and off camera he sees himself as more sensual than his porn persona.

Slayher has appeared on the Netflix's documentary series Hot Girls Wanted and Vixen Media Group's WIFEY.

== Awards ==
Slayher is the winner of multiple AVN Awards.

AVN Awards
Year	Film	Award	Result
2025	Anna Claire Clouds: Dark Side	AVN Award for Best Gangbang Sex Scene	Won
2023	Dream Slut, Blonde, Stacked	AVN Award for Best Boy/Girl Sex Scene	Won
2022	Psychosexual Part 4	AVN Award for Best Tag-Team Sex Scene	Won
2019	Abigail	AVN Award for Best Double-Penetration Sex Scene	Won
