= Ariana Marie =

American pornographic actress (born 1992/1993)

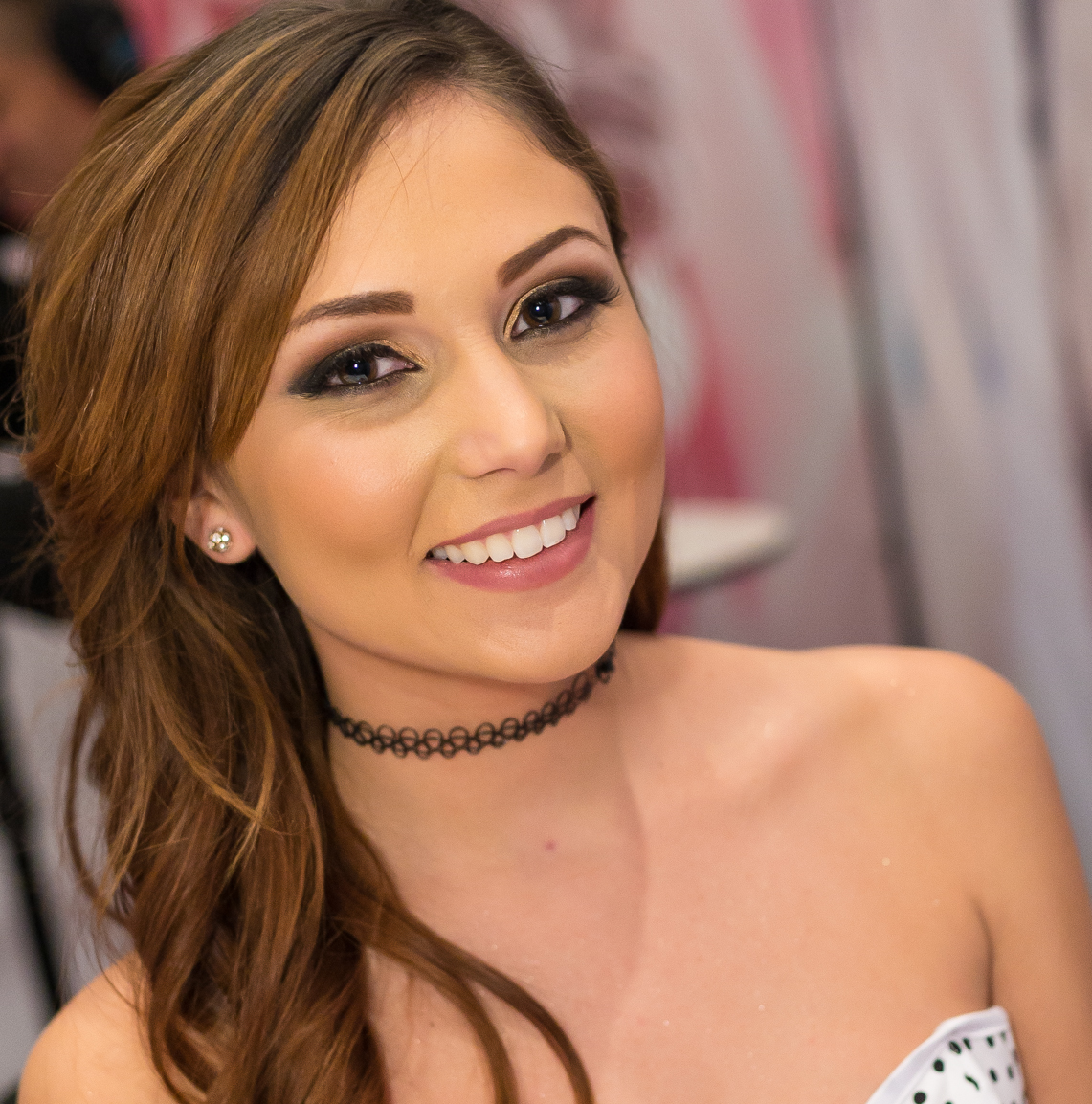
- Marie in 2015
- Born: 1992 or 1993 (age 33–34); Texas, U.S.
- Years active: 2013–present
- Children: 1
- Website: arianamarie.com

Ariana Marie (born 1992 or 1993) is an American pornographic actress, camgirl, and dancer. She was named Penthouse Pet of the Month in November 2014, and has been nominated for several AVN Awards, XBIZ Awards, and other industry awards.

== Career ==
Born in Texas, Marie worked as a waitress before entering the adult film industry. She was initially paid $1,200 per scene, a rate at "the higher end of today's standard range", but her booking agent took a 40-percent commission; Marie was initially unaware that this was far higher than the usual 10–20 percent commission. Marie's next agent took a lower rate, but also pushed her to work for less pay for companies with whom he was friendly. Marie initially "focused on filming for the traditional porn companies", working for studios including Mile High, Bang Productions, Adam & Eve, Girlfriends Films, Kick Ass Pictures, Evil Angel, Pure Play Media, and Pulse Distribution. She has also worked for sites like Mofos, Bang Bros, HD Passion, Digital Desire, Naughty America, and Vixen.

In November 2014, she was named Pet of the Month by Penthouse magazine. The same month, she was chosen as Twistys Treat of the Month. Also in 2014, she was nominated for an XBIZ Award in the Best New Starlet category.

After several years of success in the pornographic film industry, Marie branched out into webcam modelling. A 2017 Maxim article on cam-girls profiled Marie, noting that her house is "outfitted with cameras that give her audience a live stream from nearly every room, including the shower", and quoting Marie as saying that there were "a total of eight, maybe ten cameras throughout the whole house", having "a feed that goes 24/7 for the fans to see a day in the life of Ariana Marie." In a 2017 Glamour magazine interview, Marie stated that she "always did well in school, but it didn't hold my attention. So although I'm sure I could have made it through college, I don't know if I would have had the patience for it". She also discussed how her adult film career improved her financial status:

Since [getting into] the adult industry, I've been able to pay off all my debt, put thousands of dollars a month in savings, increase my credit score to near perfection, buy my own house and car, travel when and where I want, start several businesses, help friends and family in need, help pay for my own wedding, and live a comfortable, financially stress-free life. All of this before turning 25 years old. I cannot imagine that I could have accomplished this without my adult film career.

In 2015, Marie expressed disagreement with proposed laws that would require pornographic actors to use condoms, noting that they are a distraction when filming, and expressing her trust in the process performers go through to be tested for sexually transmitted diseases. Marie stated in a 2018 Cosmopolitan article that her preferred condom is Lifestyles SKYN, which Marie claims causes less irritation than other condoms. According to Marie, "I've given blowjobs with guys wearing it and I don't even smell or taste anything. That makes me happy, because normally I'd gag, but not with these ones". In August 2018, The Daily Dot named her one of the 30 top porn stars in virtual reality.

As of 2019, Marie had shot over 160 films, and, as of June 2019, Ariana was under a one-year Exclusive Contract as an actress and spokesmodel for Vixen Media Group. Between Twitter, Instagram, and other social media sites, Marie reportedly had "over a million combined social media followers". She has two tattoos on her body, including a 15 above right breast and left hip. By 2019, Marie had found that promoting her own brand with self-made content was more lucrative than working for other production companies, although she thereafter continued doing work for those production companies on a limited basis for the purpose of "maintaining status and recognition within the industry".

== Personal life ==
As of 2017, Marie was married to retired adult performer Jack Spade. In June 2022, she revealed on Twitter that she was pregnant, and in November, she tweeted that she had given birth to her first child, a girl.

== Awards ==
- 2015 Twistys Treat of the Year
- 2018 NightMoves Award – Best Body (Editor's Choice)
- 2019 NightMoves Award – Best Star Showcase (Editor's Choice) – Ariana Marie: A Little Bit Harder
- 2020 Vixen Angel of the Year
- 2021 AVN Award – Mainstream Venture of the Year
