= Maitland Ward =

American actress (born 1977)

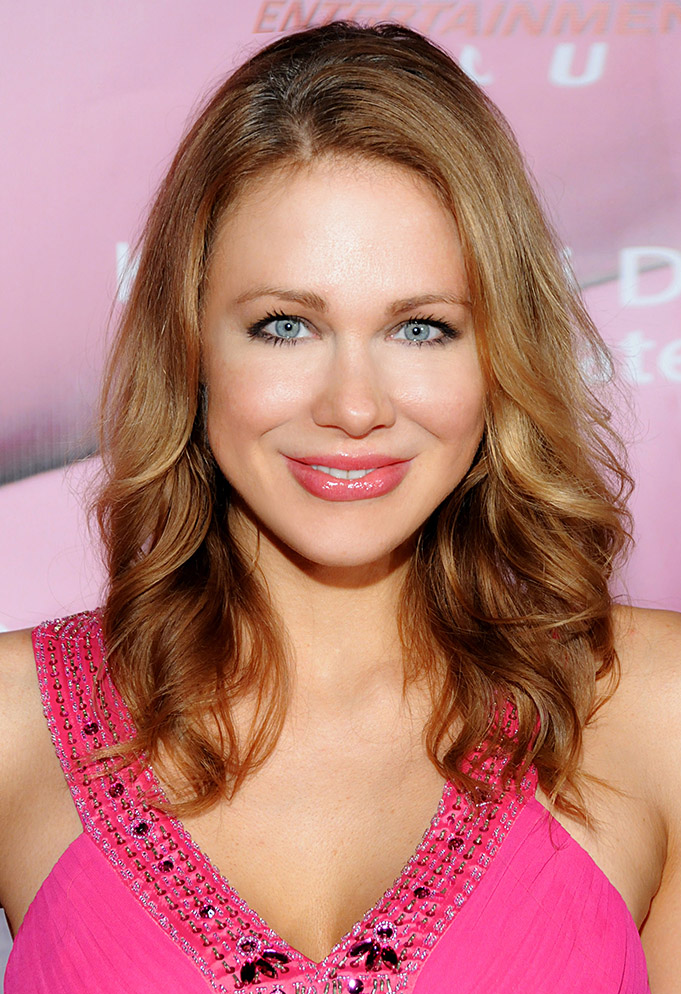
- Ward in 2014
- Born: Ashley Maitland Welkos; February 3, 1977 (age 49); Long Beach, California, U.S.
- Occupations: Mainstream actress; pornographic film actress; internet personality
- Years active: 1994–2007 (mainstream); 2019–present (pornography)
- Known for: The Bold and the Beautiful; Boy Meets World
- Spouse: Terry Baxter (m. 2006)

Maitland Ward (born Ashley Maitland Welkos; February 3, 1977) is an American pornographic film actress, former mainstream film and television actress, and model. She made her acting debut as Jessica Forrester on the CBS soap opera The Bold and the Beautiful (1994–1996). Continuing to appear in film and television through the mid-2000s, she came to further prominence for playing Rachel McGuire on the sixth and seventh seasons of the ABC sitcom Boy Meets World (1998–2000). After retiring from mainstream acting in 2007, Ward began performing in pornographic films in 2019.

== Career ==
=== Acting career ===
Ward starred as Jessica Forrester on The Bold and the Beautiful, where she appeared from 1994 to 1996. Ward had guest-starring roles on USA High and the seventh season of ABC's Home Improvement; and co-starred with Jay Thomas and Mario Lopez in the 1997 television film Killing Mr. Griffin.

Her character of Rachel McGuire was added to Boy Meets World in 1998, at the beginning of the sixth season, as a main cast member. This role lasted until the series ended in 2000. After Ward's stint on Boy Meets World, she appeared in the independent film Dish Dogs, a romantic comedy in which she co-stars with Brian Dennehy, Matthew Lillard and Sean Astin. Later, she appeared in the 2004 comedy film White Chicks with Shawn and Marlon Wayans.

=== Cosplay and social media ===
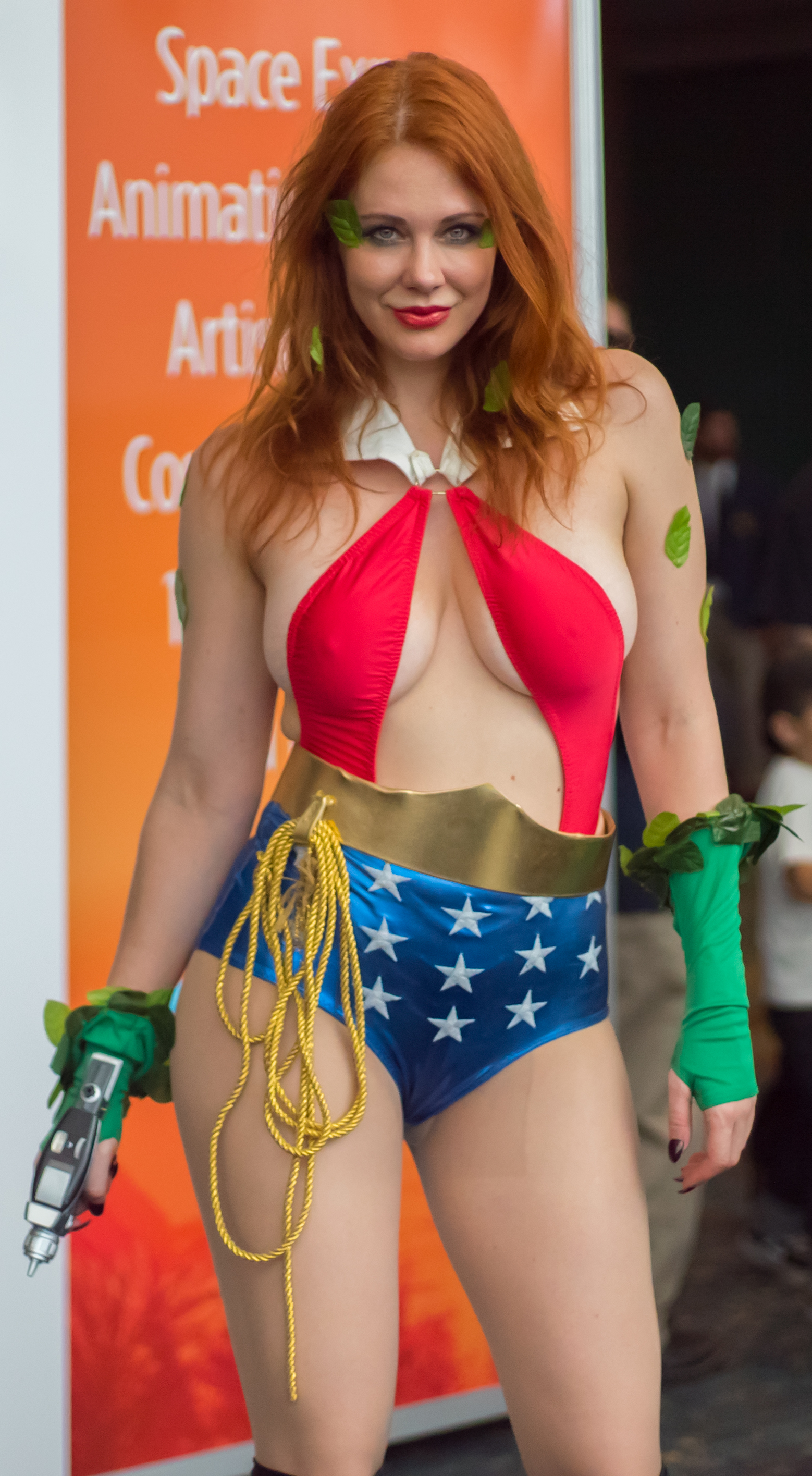
Ward cosplaying in September 2015

After retiring from mainstream acting, Ward began engaging in cosplay and making appearances at various comics conventions. Her first cosplay was a slave Princess Leia outfit; she was given the idea by photographers that she had worked with on the red carpet. She also appeared as Jessica 6 from Logan's Run and as Red Sonja. By 2017, she was making comics-convention appearances wearing only body paint.

=== Adult film career ===
Beginning in mid-2013, Ward began posting nude and topless photographs of herself on Snapchat and Instagram. In April 2016, she posted her first nude pictures to social media of her being body-painted for Luciano Paesani for a Los Angeles exhibition called "Living Art". In 2019, she announced on Instagram that she would be performing in an adult film entitled Drive, a move described by In Touch Weekly as a "drastic career-shift". Ward received support from former Boy Meets World co-star Trina McGee.

In May 2019, Ward signed with adult talent agency Society 15. She stated that she had been approached by adult actress and director Kayden Kross and was "just floored" by the proposition of doing adult films. She told In Touch Weekly, "It's been an evolution. It's all been my authentic journey because everything that I have done along the way is something I wanted to explore and do. I just did it publicly for my fans, that is the exhibitionist style of me." Drive was released online at the website Deeper.com on September 30, 2019.

Of her decision, Ward stated that she feared being typecast and believed that if she became a porn actress, new fans would have an opportunity to discover her. Upon Drive's release, Ward promised "more taboo stuff to come", and she subsequently appeared in multiple additional porn scenes released on Deeper.com. She has said that she regards her transition into adult films as a savvy business move.

== Personal life ==
A native of Long Beach, California, Ward married real estate agent Terry Baxter on October 21, 2006. The couple met on a set. When they first got married, the couple moved to New York City for two years, during which time Ward studied writing and screenwriting at New York University; when they returned to Los Angeles, she continued her studies at UCLA.

In 2022, Atria Books published her autobiography, Rated X: How Porn Liberated Me from Hollywood.

== Filmography ==
=== Mainstream filmography ===
Film and television roles
| Year | Title | Role | Notes |
|---|---|---|---|
| 1994–1996 | The Bold and the Beautiful | Jessica Forrester | Recurring role (129 episodes) |
| 1997 | Killing Mr. Griffin | Candice Lee | Television film (NBC) |
| 1998 | USA High | Tina | Episode: "Buddies" |
| 1998 | Home Improvement | Christy | Episode: "The Old College Try" |
| 1998–2000 | Boy Meets World | Rachel McGuire | Main cast (45 episodes) |
| 1999 | A Bold Affair | Eleanor | |
| 2000 | Dish Dogs | Molly | Feature film; direct-to-video |
| 2002 | Boston Public | Rachel Newman | Episode: "Chapter 43" |
| 2004 | White Chicks | Brittany Wilson | |
| 2005 | Out of Practice | Staci | Episode: "Pilot" |
| 2007 | Rules of Engagement | Dani | Episode: "Young and the Restless" |

=== Adult films ===
| Year | Title | Studio | Notes |
|---|---|---|---|
| 2019 | Cosplay Queen | VR Bangers | |
| 2019 | Unprofessional | Blacked | |
| 2019 | Wet and Wild | Brazzers | |
| 2019 | Order of Termination | VR Bangers | |
| 2019 | Drive | Deeper | Series |
| 2019 | Black and Red | Blacked | Series |
| 2019 | When Superstars Collide | Lesbian X | |
| 2019 | Raw 38 | Jules Jordan | Series |
| 2019 | Lesbian Superstars | Lesbian X | Series |
| 2019 | We All Do It, Too | Blacked | |
| 2019–2020 | Mistress Maitland | Deeper | Series |
| 2020 | Poolside Affairs | Brazzers | Series |
| 2020 | Being Shared | Deeper | |
| 2020 | Showgirl | VR Bangers | |
| 2020 | Intimates: Maitland Ward | Intimates | |
| 2020 | At Last | Deeper | |
| 2020 | Muse | Deeper | Series |
| 2020 | Fertile | Blacked | |
| 2021 | Stars 2 | Blacked | Series |
| 2021 | Mistress Maitland 2 | Deeper | Series |
| 2021 | Muse 2 | Deeper | Series |
| 2022 | Sex Without Love | Deeper | |
| 2022 | Poetics for Tramps | Deeper | Series |
| 2022 | Drift | Deeper | Series |
| 2022 | Stars 4 | Blacked | Series |

== Awards and nominations ==
- Soap Opera Digest Awards
  - 1995: Nominated, Outstanding Female Newcomer – The Bold and the Beautiful
- Young Artist Awards
  - 1995: Won, Best Performance by a Youth Actress in a Daytime Series – The Bold and the Beautiful
  - 1996: Nominated, Best Performance by a Youth Actress in a Daytime Series – The Bold and the Beautiful
- AVN Awards
  - 2020: Won, Best Supporting Actress – Drive
  - 2020: Won, Best Three-Way Sex Scene (G/G/B) – Drive
  - 2020: Won, Fan Award - Favorite Camming Cosplayer
  - 2021: Won, Best Actress – Muse
  - 2021: Won, Best Boy/Girl Sex Scene – Higher Power
  - 2023: Won, Best Leading Actress – Drift
  - 2023: Won, Mainstream Venture of the Year
  - 2024: Won, Best Actress - Featurette – My DP 6, Casting Couch
  - 2025: Won, Best Actress - Featurette – Pigeonholed
- XBIZ Awards
  - 2020: Won, Crossover Star of the Year
  - 2020: Won, Best Actress - Feature Movie – Drive
  - 2020: Won, Best Sex Scene - Feature Movie – Drive
  - 2020: Nominated, Best New Starlet
  - 2021: Won, Best Acting - Lead – Muse
  - 2021: Won, Best Sex Scene - Feature Movie – Muse
  - 2022: Won, Performer of the Year
  - 2022: Won, Best Acting - Lead – Muse 2
  - 2023: Won, Best Sex Scene - Feature Movie – Drift
  - 2025: Won, Best Acting - Lead – American MILF
  - 2025: Won, Best Sex Scene - Comedy Movie – American MILF
- NightMoves Awards
  - 2020: Won, Best Actress (Editor's Choice)
- XRCO Awards
  - 2021: Won, Best Actress – Muse
  - 2022: Won, Best Actress – Muse 2
  - 2023: Won, Best Actress – Drift
- AltPorn Awards
  - 2020: Won, Fan-Favorite Cosplay Cam
- XCritic Awards
  - 2021: Won, Best Actress – Muse
  - 2022: Won, Best Actress – Muse 2
