= Tennis Titans =

2005 video game

- Developer: Skunk Studios
- Publisher: Skunk Studios
- Designer: Margaret Wallace
- Programmers: Joseph Walters, Kalle Wik
- Platforms: Microsoft Windows, Macintosh
- Release: 16 March 2005
- Genre: Sports
- Mode: Single-player

Tennis Titans is a casual arcade-style tennis video game developed and published by San Francisco-based Skunk Studios. It was released for Windows on 16 March 2005 and for Macintosh on 6 April 2005. The game offers cartoon visuals, simple mouse controls, and two modes of play. It was available as shareware.

Tennis Titans was awarded Macromedia Site of the Day.

== Gameplay ==
Tennis Titans utilizes straightforward, mouse-only controls inspired by “break-out” mechanics; players position their avatar and click or double-click to initiate different shot types such as topspin, power shot (double-click), lob (right-click), and drop shot (double right-click). It also supports drag-based aiming when holding the mouse button down after clicking.

There are two main gameplay modes:

- Classic Tour (red): Traditional tennis format played as best-of-three sets. Victory against opponents unlocks new characters and courts
- Rings Tour (blue): Time-limited (two-minute) mode featuring colored rings on the court. Players score by hitting the ball through rings of varying sizes and colors, each granting a different point value. The winner of each rally receives the total ring score from that exchange. Power-ups appear in this mode, such as a “turtle” that slows the ball or a bomb that clears rings on court.

Additional features include seven animated, cartoon-style characters: many borrowed from other Skunk Studios titles, such as Varmintz, and four detailed courts: Forest, Tropical Island, Skunk Stadium, and Ancient Greek Arena progressively unlocked via the “Tour map”. The game features an "Exhibition mode", allowing free play against any unlocked character on any unlocked court. It also includes a relaxing music, bright 3D visuals, and lighthearted presentation aimed at a broad audience.

== Plot ==
While Tennis Titans itself is not narrative-heavy, it does have a light promotional storyline where players embarks on a journey through varied courts, such as unlocking characters along the way and aiming to become the ultimate Tennis Titan by defeating the final boss Poh Poh, the reigning champion. After Poh Poh is defeated, player's character performs a victory pose and the message “You’re the new Tennis Titan!” is displayed.

== Reception ==
Reception

Review score
| Publication | Score |
|---|---|
| GameSpot | 6.4/10 |

Gamepressure gave a user rating of about 6.9 out of 10, describing it as "very light and pleasant," targeted especially at younger tennis fans and praising its easy-to-learn controls, cartoonish graphics, and family-friendly challenge level.

GameSpot awarded Tennis Titans a score of 6.4 out of 10. The review praised its appealing visual style and silly voice acting, and noted its accessibility and ease of learning. However, it also criticized as overly simplified, likening it to Pong, and remarked that later championship matches could drag on endlessly due to low scoring rates in Classic mode. While Rings mode added variety, the core gameplay shortcomings persisted.

Macworld described the game as “cute, inexpensive sports game and a fun way to pass the time,” dubbing it “relaxing and enjoyable fun.” However, the review cautioned that liking the game depended on expectations: performance issues were noted on older Macs, full-screen mode had quirks like cursor visibility and resizing other application, and it lacked multiplayer support (though it did allow global high score comparison).
