= Riley Reid =

American pornographic film actress (born 1991)

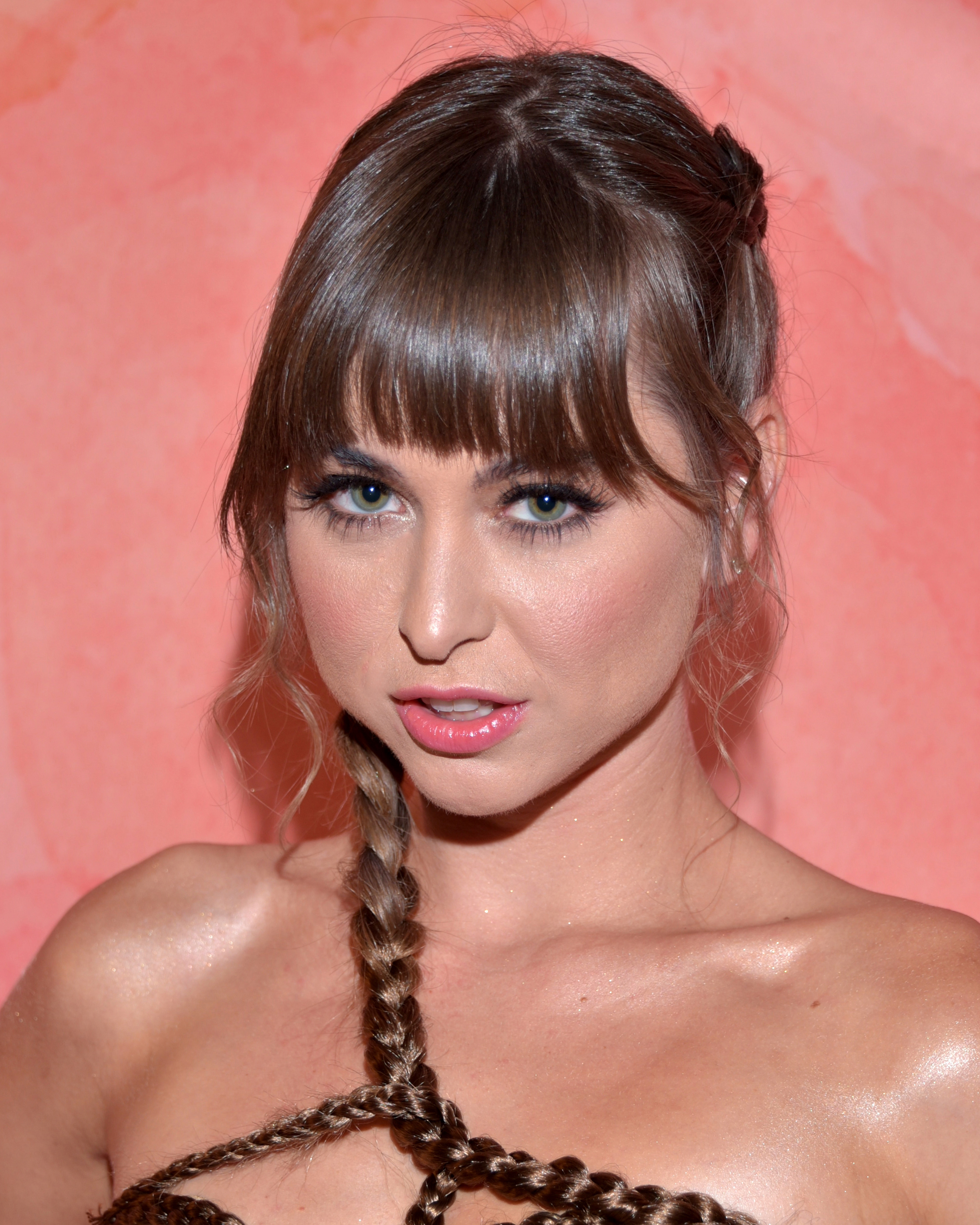
- Reid in 2019
- Born: July 9, 1991 (age 35); Miami Beach, Florida, U.S.
- Other name: Paige Riley
- Occupation: Pornographic film actress
- Years active: 2010–present
- Spouse: Pasha Petkuns
- Children: 1

Riley Reid (born July 9, 1991) is an American pornographic film actress. She has won over 50 awards, including the XBIZ Award for Female Performer of the Year in 2014 and the AVN Award for Female Performer of the Year in 2016. She was inducted into the XRCO Hall of Fame in 2021 and the AVN Hall of Fame in 2025.

== Career ==
Reid briefly worked as a stripper before entering the pornographic film industry in 2010. Performing since the age of 19, she used the stage name Paige Riley at first. In 2013, LA Weekly ranked her eighth on its list of "10 Porn Stars Who Could Be the Next Jenna Jameson". She was placed on CNBC's list of "The Dirty Dozen: Porn's Most Popular Stars" in 2014, 2015, and 2016. Reid won the XBIZ Awards for Best New Starlet in 2013 and Female Performer of the Year in 2014, making her the first performer to win the awards consecutively.

Reid has performed in BDSM productions in both dominant and submissive roles. In a 2018 interview, she described "romantic BDSM" and female domination as among her favorite types of scenes to perform. She joined OnlyFans in 2020 and later sold promotional posts to other creators.

In 2023, Reid launched Clona, a virtual companion platform allowing users to interact with AI-generated versions of participating creators. Reid and Lena the Plug were its first two AI companions.

== Personal life ==
Reid is married to freerunner Pavel "Pasha" Petkuns. They have a daughter.

== Awards ==
List of accolades
Award	Won
AVN Awards	23
NightMoves Awards	5
Pornhub Awards	10
Urban X Awards	1
XBIZ Awards	11
XRCO Awards	2
Other Awards	6
Totals	58

Year	Ceremony	Category	Movie
2012	NightMoves Award	Best New Starlet (Editor's Choice)	—N/a
2013	XBIZ Award	Best New Starlet	—N/a
2013	Sex Award	Porn's Perfect Girl/Girl Screen Couple (with Remy LaCroix)	—N/a
2014	AVN Award	Best Boy/Girl Sex Scene (with Mandingo)	Mandingo Massacre 6
2014	AVN Award	Best Girl/Girl Sex Scene (with Remy LaCroix)	Girl Fever
2014	AVN Award	Best Three-Way Sex Scene (G/G/B) (with Remy LaCroix and Manuel Ferrara)	Remy 2
2014	XBIZ Award	Female Performer of the Year	—N/a
2014	XBIZ Award	Best Actress - Parody Release	Grease XXX: A Parody
2014	XBIZ Award	Best Supporting Actress	The Submission of Emma Marx
2014	NightMoves Award	Best All Sex Release (Fan's Choice)	Riley Goes Gonzo
2016	AVN Award	Female Performer of the Year	—N/a
2016	AVN Award	Favorite Female Performer	—N/a
2016	AVN Award	Social Media Star	—N/a
2016	AVN Award	Best Anal Sex Scene (with Mick Blue)	Being Riley
2016	AVN Award	Best Double Penetration Sex Scene (with Erik Everhard and James Deen)	Being Riley
2016	AVN Award	Best Girl/Girl Sex Scene (with Aidra Fox)	Being Riley
2016	AVN Award	Best Star Showcase	Being Riley
2016	XRCO Award	Best Release	Being Riley
2016	XBIZ Award	Best Supporting Actress	The Submission of Emma Marx 2: Boundaries
2016	XBIZ Award	Best Sex Scene - Couples-Themed Release (with Romi Rain and Xander Corvus)	My Sinful Life
2017	AVN Award	Favorite Female Porn Star	—N/a
2017	AVN Award	Social Media Star	—N/a
2017	AVN Award	Best Girl/Girl Sex Scene (with Reena Sky)	Missing: A Lesbian Crime Story
2017	XBIZ Award	Best Sex Scene - All-Sex Release (with Toni Ribas and Jon Jon)	What's Next?
2017	XBIZ Award	Best Sex Scene - Virtual Reality	On Set with Riley
2017	Doppio Senso Night Award	International Female Performer of the Year	—N/a
2017	Urban X Award	Interracial Star of the Year	—N/a
2017	NightMoves Award	Best Star Showcase (Editor's Choice)	Riley Reid Overexposed
2017	NightMoves Award	Best All Girl Release (Fan's Choice)	Riley & Abella
2017	Twistys	Treat of the Year	—N/a
2018	AVN Award	Social Media Star	—N/a
2018	AVN Award	Best Three-Way Sex Scene (G/G/B) (with Megan Rain and Mick Blue)	Young and Beautiful
2018	Pornhub Award	Most Popular Female Performer	—N/a
2018	Pornhub Award	Top Gangbang Performer	—N/a
2018	Pornhub Award	Best Porn Twitter	—N/a
2018	XBIZ Award	Performer Site of the Year	www.reidmylips.com
2019	AVN Award	Favorite Porn Star Website	www.reidmylips.com
2019	AVN Award	Social Media Star	—N/a
2019	NightMoves Award	Social Media Star of the Year (Fan's Choice)	—N/a
2019	XCritic Award	Best Actress	The Cursed XXX
2019	Pornhub Award	Top Anal Performer	—N/a
2019	Pornhub Award	Top DP Performer	—N/a
2019	Pornhub Award	Best Porn Twitter	—N/a
2019	Fleshbot Award	Best Social Media Personality	—N/a
2020	AVN Award	Best All-Girl Group Sex Scene (with Angela White and Katrina Jade)	I Am Riley
2020	AVN Award	Best Double Penetration Sex Scene (with Ramon Nomar and Markus Dupree)	I Am Riley
2020	XBIZ Award	Performer Showcase of the Year	I Am Riley
2020	XBIZ Award	Marketing Campaign of the Year	I Am Riley
2020	Pornhub Award	Most Popular Female Performer by Women	—N/a
2020	Pornhub Award	Favorite Social Media Personality	—N/a
2021	AVN Award	Best All-Girl Group Sex Scene (with Emily Willis and Kristen Scott)	Paranormal
2021	XCritic Award	Best Non-Feature Release	I Am Riley
2021	XRCO Award	Hall of Fame	—N/a
2022	AVN Award	Best Oral Sex Scene (with Skin Diamond and Winston Burbank)	Oral Queens Riley Reid and Skin Diamond Give Spit Filled Sloppy Blowjob
2022	Pornhub Award	Most Popular Female Performer	—N/a
2023	Pornhub Award	Top Lesbian Performer	—N/a
2025	AVN Award	Hall of Fame	—N/a
2026	AVN Award	Hottest All-Girl Creator Collab (with Angela White and Mia Malkova)	—N/a
