= Jake Adams (actor) =

American pornographic actor (1992–2021)

- Born: Anthony Estes; January 20, 1992; Everett, Washington, US
- Died: July 14, 2021 (aged 29); Encino, California, US
- Occupation: Pornographic film actor

Anthony David Estes (January 20, 1992 – July 14, 2021), known professionally as Jake Adams, was an American pornographic actor and director. He was best known for his large number of appearances in adult films and multiple award nominations. At the time of his death, Adams was considered one of the most prolific and well-known male pornographic actors.

== Early and personal life ==
Estes was born in Everett, Washington, on January 20, 1992, to his parents Wayne White and Shannon Frueh. He graduated from high school in Fort Mill, South Carolina in 2010, before moving to Los Angeles to pursue his career.

In January 2021, it was reported by Rolling Stone that Estes was living with the actress Scarlit Scandal, and Scandal's statements may have indicated a romantic relationship between the two.

== Career ==
After a stint in restaurant management, Estes entered the adult film industry in 2016.

Throughout his career in the adult industry, Estes was nominated for multiple awards, with some including work he had performed with Scarlit Scandal. At the time of Estes' death, he had over 700 acting credits in pornographic films.

== Death ==
On July 14, 2021, at approximately 4:15 P.M. PST, Adams was killed in a motorcycle crash on U.S. Route 101 near the neighborhood of Encino.

Following Estes' death, various people throughout the adult industry, including James Cullen Bressack, Jessy Jones, and Haley Spades, shared their condolences and memories of their interactions with him.
