= Nia Nacci =

American pornographic film actress

- Occupation: Pornographic film actress
- Years active: 2017–present

Nia Nacci is an American pornographic film actress.

== Professional career ==
Nacci was nominated for 'Best Female Performer' at the 2020 NightMoves Awards.

=== Outside adult films ===
Nacci starred in the music video for "Still Be Friends" by G-Eazy in 2020. For this, Nacci was awarded the 2021 AVN Award for 'Mainstream Venture of the Year'.
