= Scarlit Scandal =

American pornographic film actress (born 1999/2000)

- Scandal in 2023
- Born: 1999 or 2000 (age 26–27)
- Occupation: Pornographic film actress
- Spouse: Chris DeCoster (m. 2023)
- Children: 1

Scarlit DeCoster (née Scandal, born 1999 or 2000) is an American pornographic film actress and model.

== Early life ==
A native of West Palm Beach, Florida, Scandal was living with fellow pornographic film actor Jake Adams During the COVID-19 pandemic and performed in multiple scenes with Adams. Adams died in 2021 following a motorcycle accident.

Scandal is married to fellow pornographic film actor Chris Scandal, with whom she performed in the 2023 series Love In Porn, distributed by Brazzers. Scandal and DeCoster welcomed their son on October 19, 2026.

== Professional career ==
Scandal gained notability within the industry relatively quickly, securing nominations for the Pornhub Awards as well as being named a Vixen 'Angel'. The next year, she was selected as a Cherry Pimps 'Cherry of the Month' for April 2021.

Scandal won the award for 'Best New Starlet' at the 38th AVN Awards, the first all-digital edition of the awards show. In an article made after her victory, adult film maker Kayden Kross credited Scandal's abilities in the industry, being quoted as stating Scandal has "a very intuitive sense on camera".

In 2022, she modeled in an advertisement for sneaker brand Rose In Good Faith, which utilized unused sex toys to be re-made into shoes.

In 2023, Scandal signed an exclusive contract with American pornographic company Brazzers, which was celebrated by both the company and Scandal, who cited the company's professionalism as a major reason for her decision.

== Awards ==
- 2021 XBIZ Award – Best New Performer
- 2021 XBIZ Award – Best Sex Scene - Erotic Themed (with Ryan McLane) – Obsessed
- 2021 AVN Award – Best New Starlet
- 2021 AVN Award – Best Three-Way Sex Scene (with Gianna Dior and Rob Piper) – Muse
- 2021 AVN Award – Mainstream Venture of the Year
- 2021 Fleshbot Award – Best Girl-Girl Performer
- 2022 XBIZ Award – Best Sex Scene - All-Girl (with Ana Foxxx) – Sweet Sweet Sally Mae
- 2022 AVN Award – Best Foursome/Orgy Sex Scene (with Marica Hase, Lulu Chu, Mona Wales, Destiny Cruz, and Oliver Flynn) – Chaired
