= 2nd Pornhub Awards =

Pornographic award ceremony

- Date: October 11, 2019
- Site: Orpheum Theatre, Los Angeles, California
- Hosted by: Asa Akira

Television coverage
- Channel: Pornhub TV
- Duration: 1 hr 41 min
- Viewership: ~ 8 million

The 2nd Pornhub Awards was a major pornography awards ceremony held October 11, 2019 at Orpheum Theatre in Los Angeles, California. The show was hosted by Asa Akira and featured musical performances by Bad Bunny, Ty Dolla Sign, Rico Nasty, Tommy Genesis and Kali Uchis.

== Award winners and nominations ==
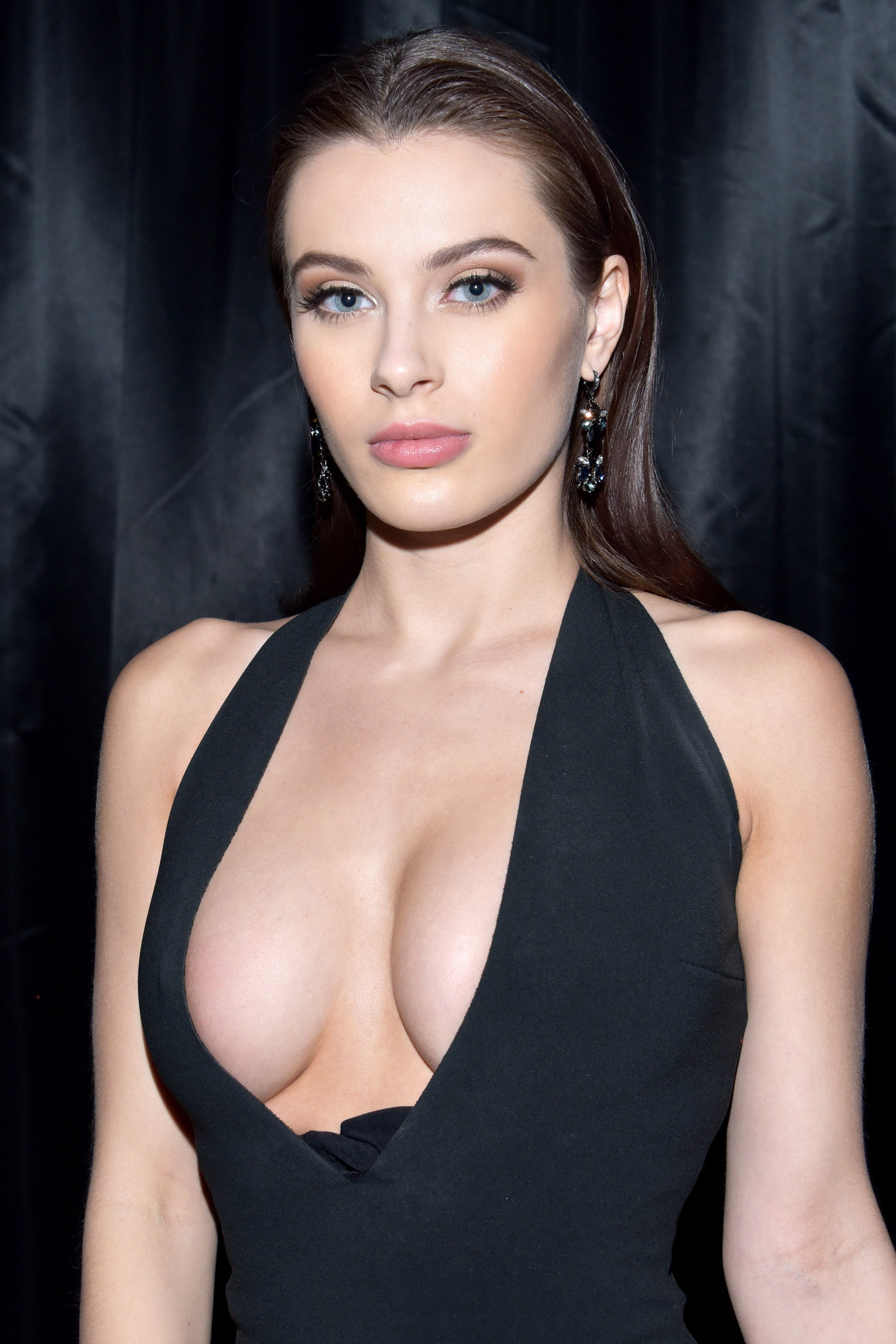
Lana Rhoades, winner of Most Popular Female Performer

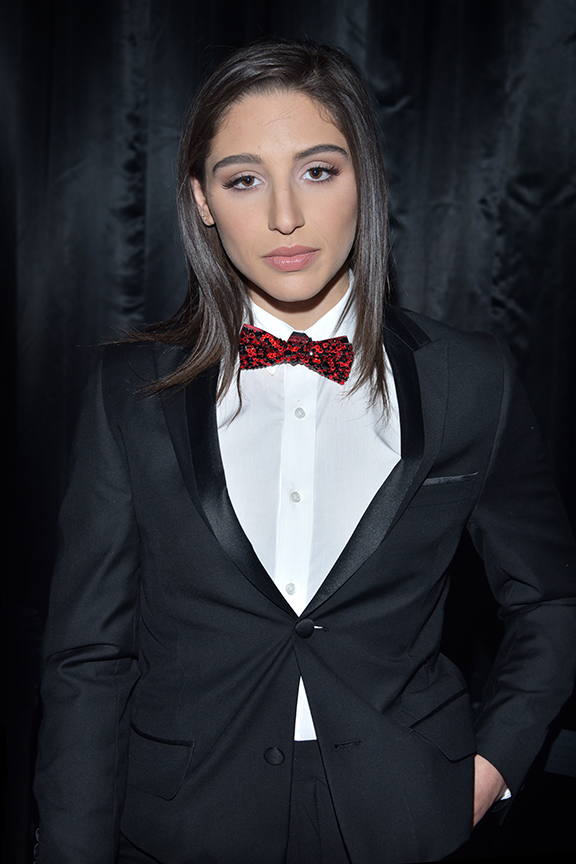
Abella Danger, winner of Most Popular Female Pornstar By Women

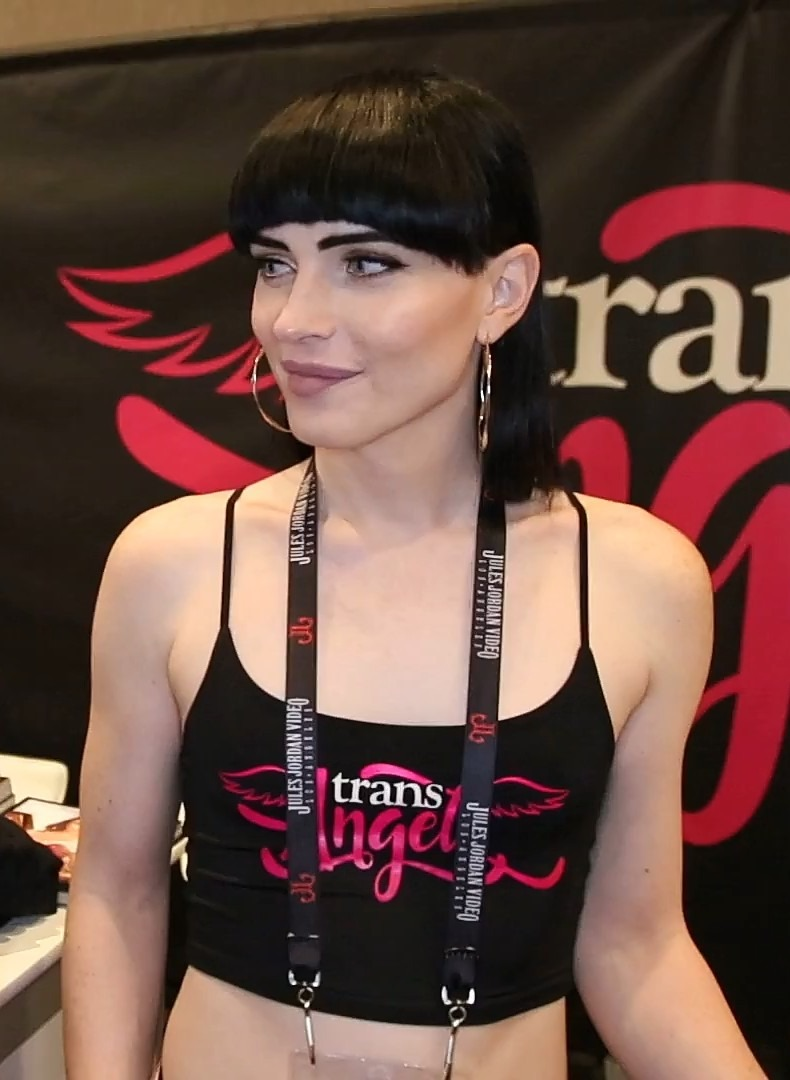
Natalie Mars – winner of Most Popular Trans Performer

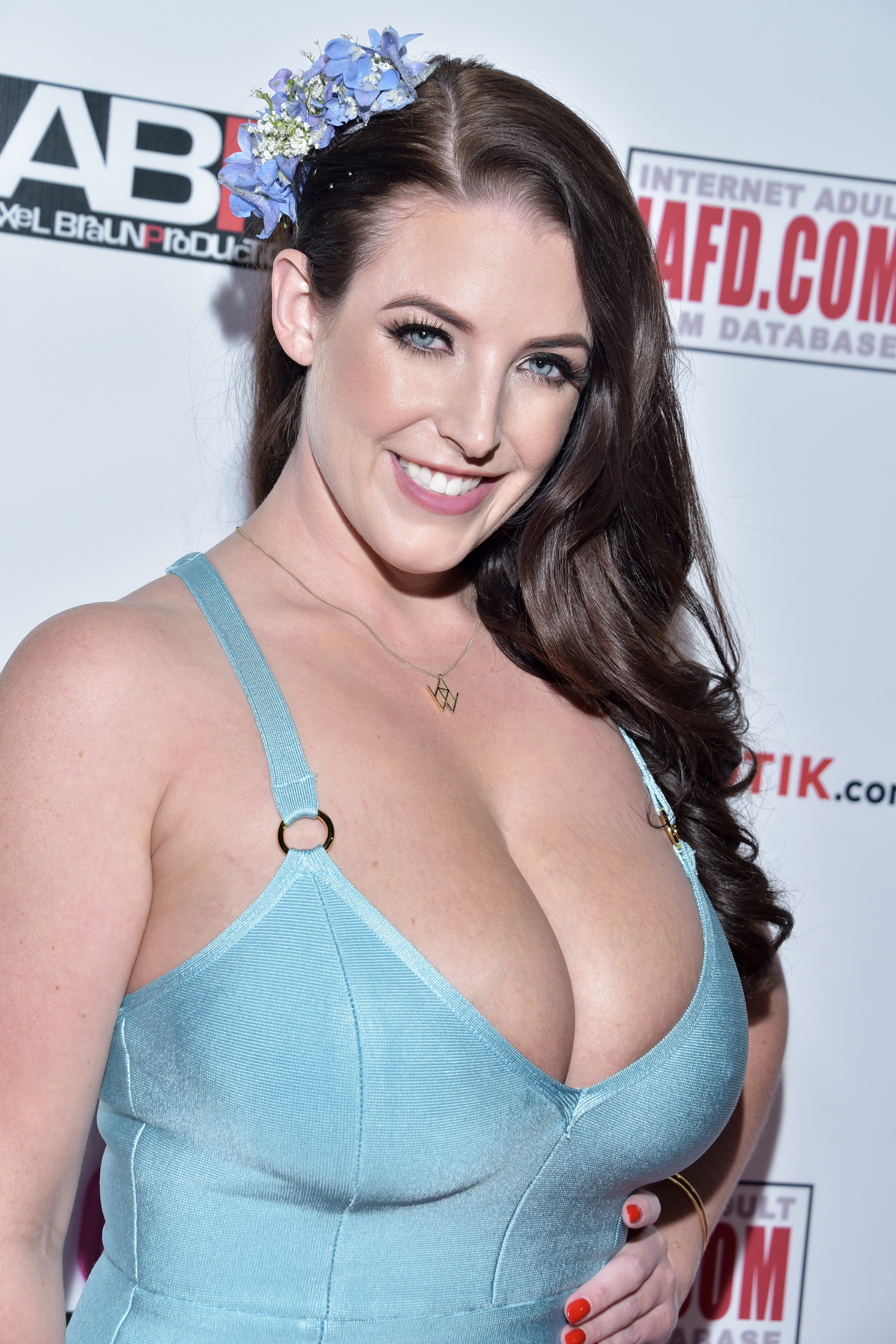
Angela White, winner of Top Big Tits Performer

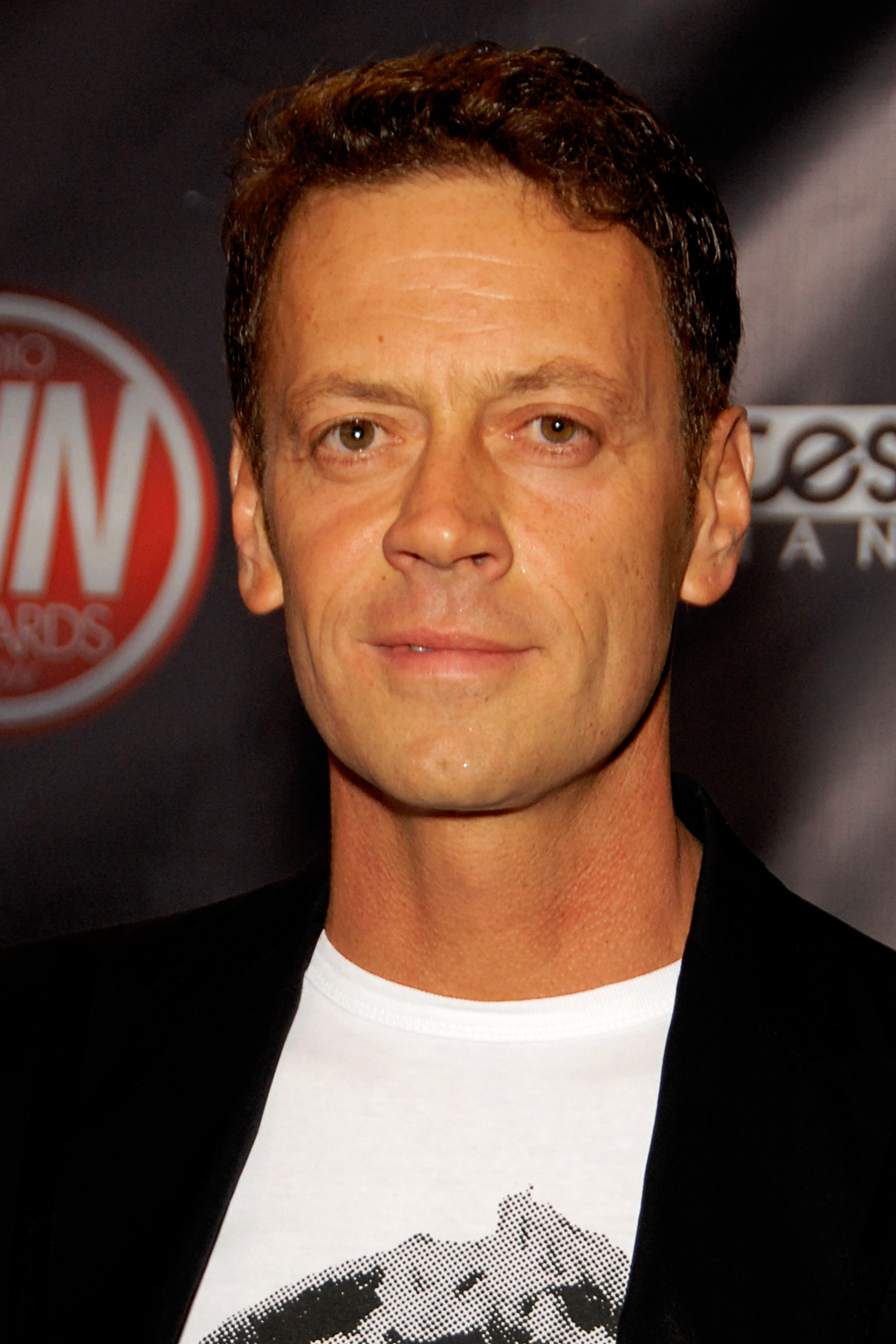
Rocco Siffredi, winner of Top Big Dick Performer

Winners are in bold.

Most Popular Female Performer	Most Popular Male Performer
**Lana Rhoades**; Adriana Chechik; Leo From LeoLulu; Angela White; Abella Danger; Mia Malkova; Riley Reid; Brandi Love; Sarah Banks; Nicole Aniston	**Jordi El Niño Polla**; Mandingo; Mark Rockwell; Jason Luv; Alex Adams; Keiran Lee; James Deen; Owen Gray; Johnny Sins; Lulu From LeoLulu
Top Channel	Most Popular Network
**Brazzers**; Blacked; Property Sex; Bratty Sis; Fake Taxi; Public Agent; Family Strokes; Cum4K; Vixen; Reality Kings	**Team Skeet**; FakeHub; Reality Kings; OfficialNubiles; Naughty America; Brazzers; Blacked; Kink.com; Pornpros; BangBros
Top Celebrity	Most Popular Verified Amateur
**Belle Delphine**; Kinsey Sue; Bella Thorne; Cardi B; Kim Kardashian; Stormy Daniels; Vitaly; Tana Mongeau; Chris Crocker; Lena The Plug	**Leolulu**; NoFaceGirl; Danika Mori; Teacher_of_magic; Solazola; Kinkycouple111; Tinna Angel; LittleReislin; BehindTheMaskk; CarryLight
Most Popular Female Pornstar By Women	Most Popular Male Pornstar By Women
**Abella Danger**; Lisa Ann; Brandi Love; Riley Reid; Sarah Banks; Lana Rhoades; Nicole Aniston; Angela White; Adriana Chechik; Jebadetta Manon	**Johnny Sins**; Alex Adams; Zilv Gudel; Owen Gray; Wolf Hudson; Prince Yahshua; Mark Rockwell; Lulu From Leolulu; Jordi El Nino Polla; Danny D
Top Big Tits Performer	Top Big Dick Performer
**Angela White**; Moriah Mills; Bryci; Ava Addams; Larkin Love; Kendra Sunderland; Korina Kova; Bridgette B; Hitomi Tanaka; Peta Jensen	**Rocco Siffredi**; Chris Diamond; Ricky Johnson; Shane Diesel; Jason Luv; Keiran Lee; Manuel Ferrara; Dredd; Mandingo; Bruce Venture
Top MILF Performer	Top Fetish Performer
**Brandi Love**; Mandy Flores; Cherie Deville; Diamond Jackson; Cory Chase; Alexis Fawx; Lisa Ann; Sara Jay; Julia Ann; Ava Addams	**Lady Fyre**; Cali Logan; Diane Andrews; Bianca Stone; Mistress T; Larkin Love; Misha Mayfair; Ezada Sinn; Mandy Flores; Lance Hart
Top Lesbian Performer	Most Popular Gay Performer
**Abigail Mac**; Mary Moody; Marie Mccray; Celeste Star; Elle Alexandra; Sinn Sage; Jenna Sativa; Vanessa Veracruz; Jelena Jensen; Darcie Dolce	**Austin Wolf**; Joey Mills; Dante Colle; William Seed; Armond Rizzo; Johnny Rapid; Alam Wernick; Austin Wilde; Diego Sans; Cade Maddox
Most Popular Trans Performer	Top BBW Performer
**Natalie Mars**; Aubrey Kate; Jessy Dubai; Domino Presley; Sarina Valentina; Daisy Taylor; Venus Lux; VicaTS; Chanel Santini; Bailey Jay	**Jade Jordan**; Anastasia Lux; Sofia Rose; Dahlia Dee; Bigbuttbooty96; Angelina Castro; Harmony Reigns; Lovely Lilith; Mal Malloy; Maserati

=== Additional award winners ===
- Top Blowjob Performer: Sybil Stallone
- Top Female Solo Performer: Elles (rescinded)
- **Top Cosplay Performer** Indigo White
- **Top DP Performer** Riley Reid
- Top Squirting Performer: Danika Mori
- Most Popular Gay Channel: CzechHunter
- Most Popular Trans Channel: Trans500
- Top Daddy Performer: Zilv Gudel

=== Fan award winners ===
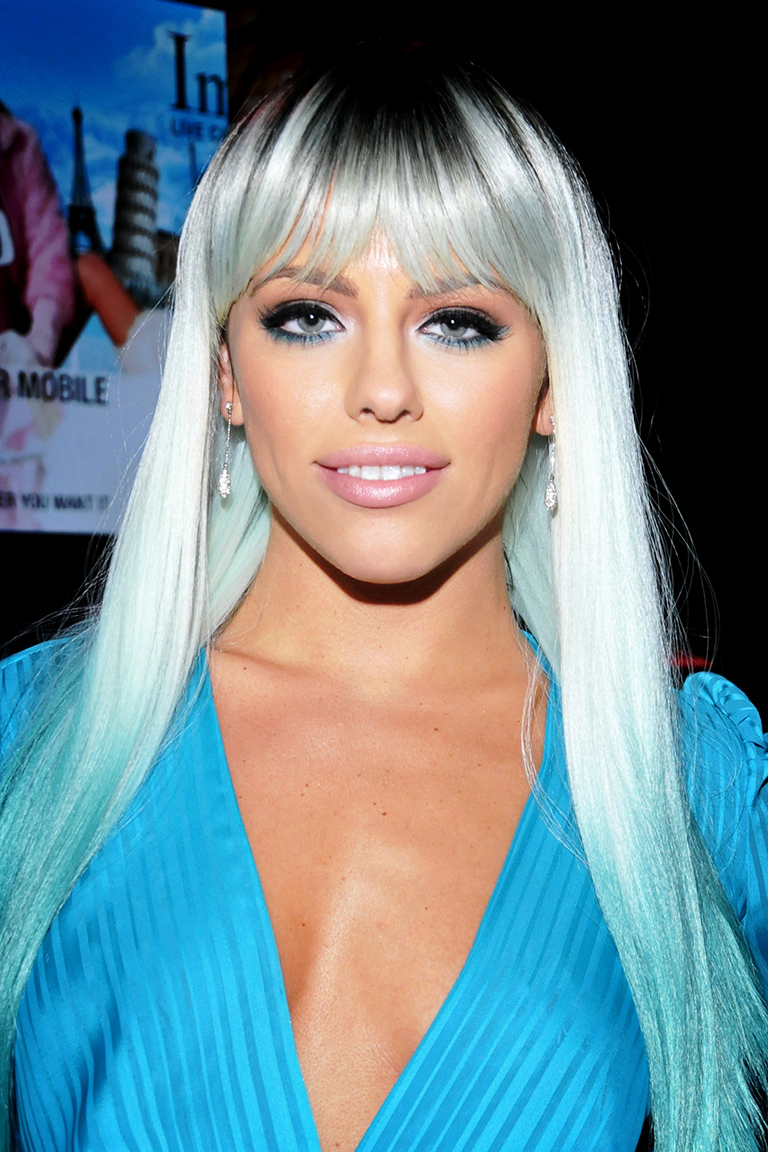
Adriana Chechik, winner of Best Snapchat

Fans voted for the winners of the following awards.

- Best Instagram: Abella Danger
- Best Twitter: Riley Reid
- Best Dick: Johnny Sins
- Nicest Pussy: Elsa Jean
- Favorite MILF: Brandi Love
- Nicest Tits: Dillion Harper
- Hottest Inked: Model Karma Rx
- Hottest Ass: Abella Danger
- Favorite Fetish Model: Mandy Flores
- Favorite Trans Model: Aubrey Kate
- Favorite Gay Model: Zilv Gudel
- Favorite BBW: Model Pinky
- Favorite Channel: Blacked
- Cam Performer of the Year: Jenny Blighe
- Best Snapchat: Adriana Chechik
- Favorite Newcomer: Autumn Falls
- Favorite Cosplayer: Mykinkydope
- Favorite Couple: Leolulu
- Best Fan Club: Asa Akira
- Best Modelhub: Nofacegirl

== Production ==
The show was hosted by Asa Akira and streamed on Pornhub. It was held the Orpheum Theatre in Los Angeles. The one hour and forty minute broadcast featured musical performances by Bad Bunny, Ty Dolla Sign, Rico Nasty and Kali Uchis.
