= 1st Pornhub Awards =

American pornographic award ceremony

- Date: September 6, 2018
- Site: Belasco Theater, Los Angeles, California, U.S.
- Hosted by: Asa Akira

Television coverage
- Channel: Pornhub TV
- Duration: 2 hrs 10 min
- Viewership: ~ 6 million

The 1st Pornhub Awards was held on September 6, 2018 at the Belasco Theater in Los Angeles. It was hosted by Asa Akira and featured a performance by Kanye West.

== Award winners and nominees ==
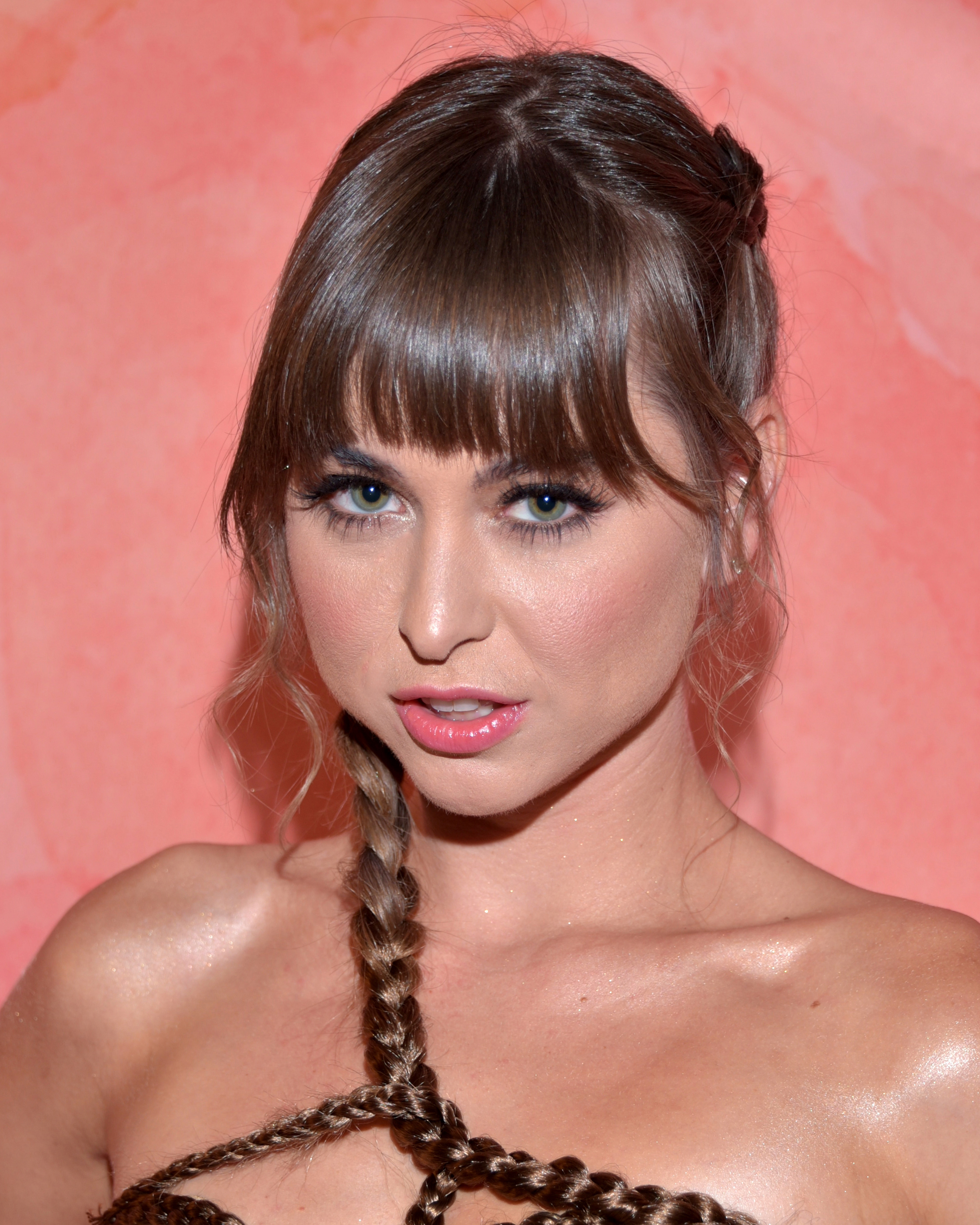
Riley Reid – winner of Most Popular Female Performer

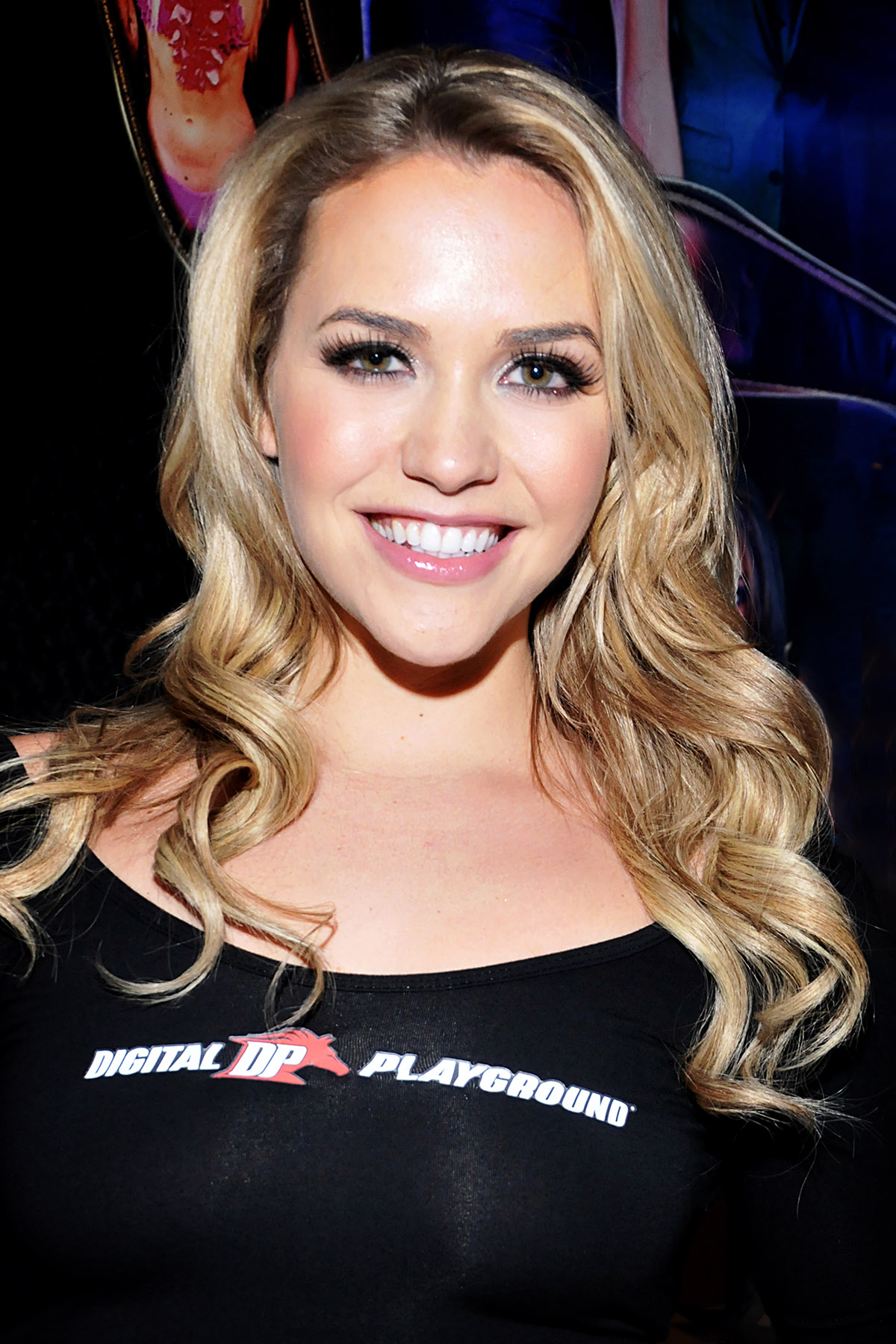
Mia Malkova – winner of Most Popular Female Performer by Women

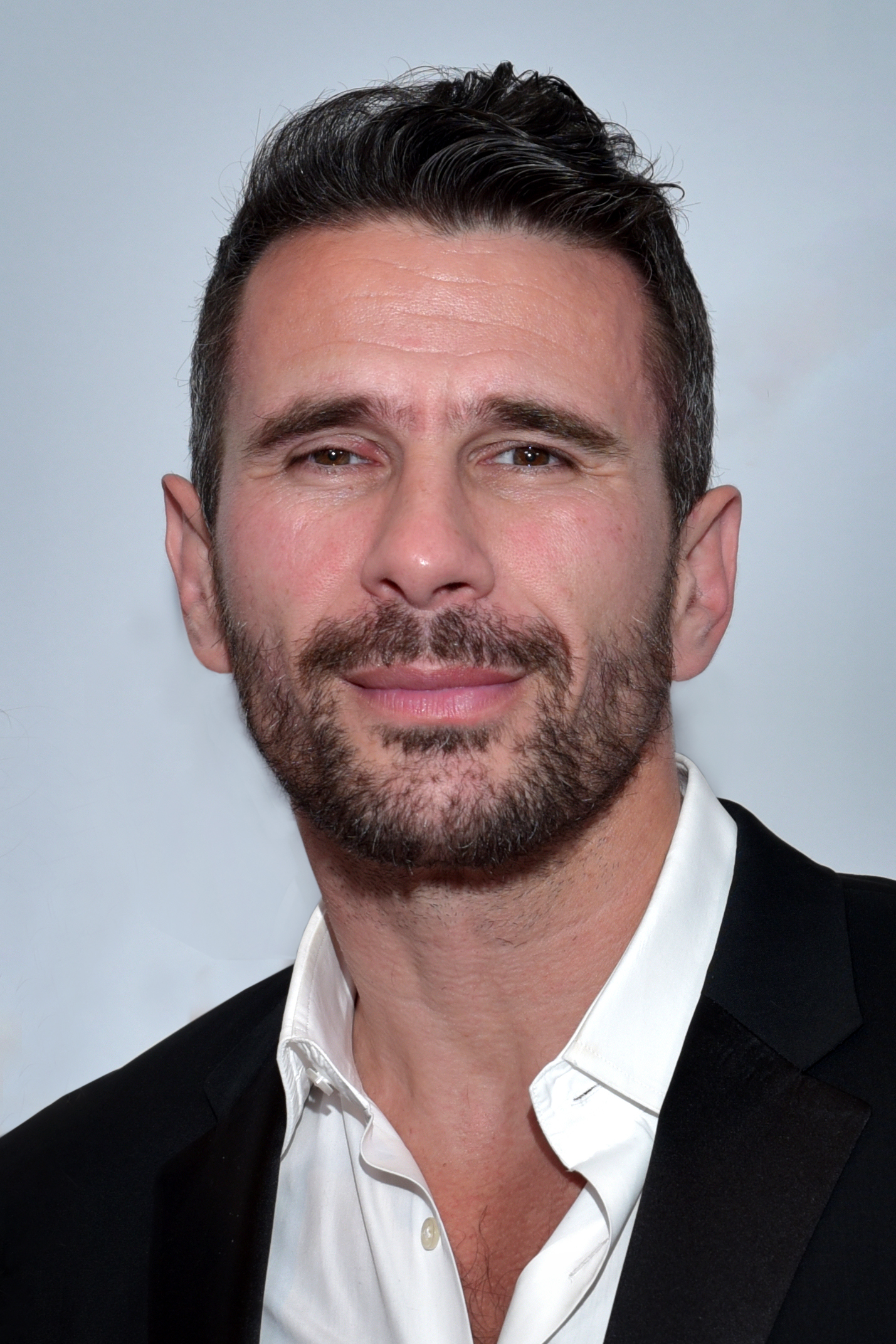
Manuel Ferrara – winner of Top Big Dick Performer

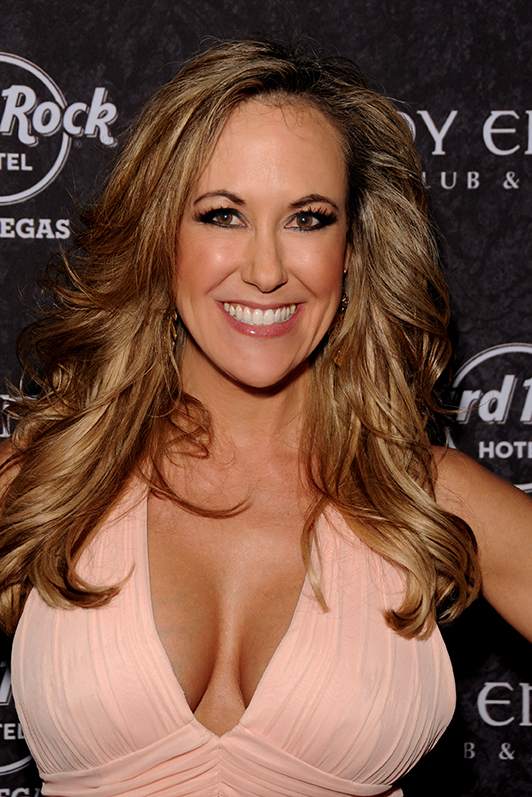
Brandi Love – winner of Top MILF Performer

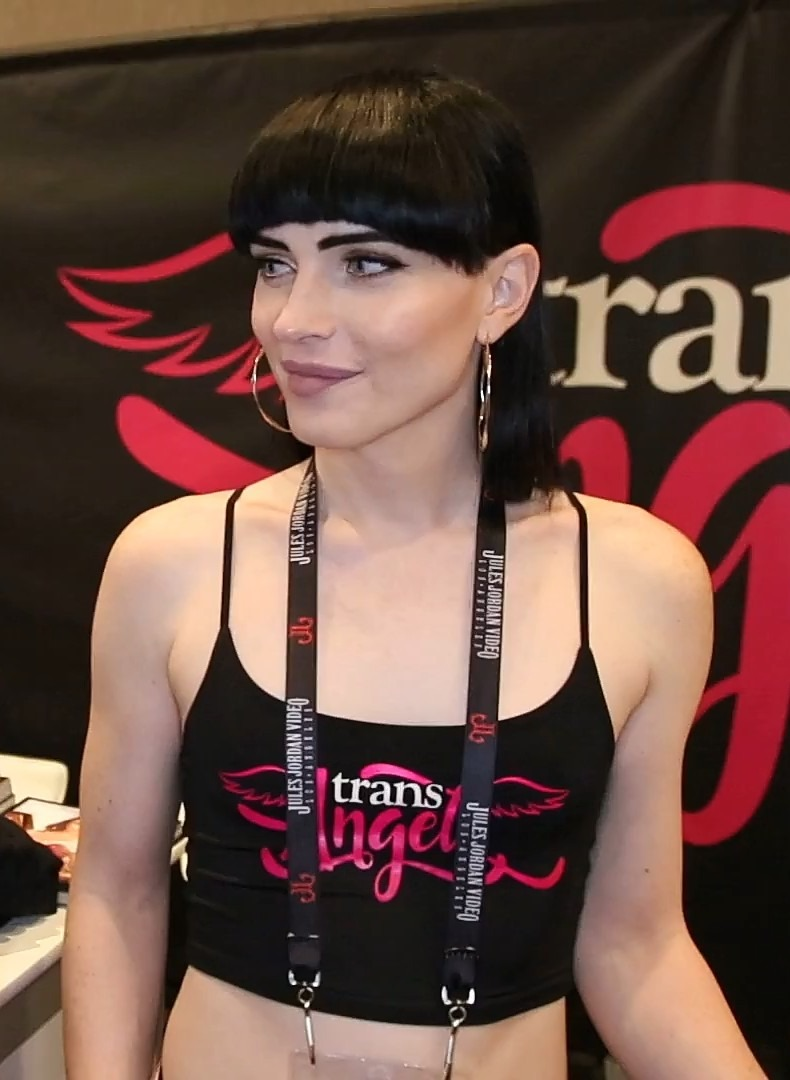
Natalie Mars – winner of Top Trans Performer

Winners are in bold.

Most Popular Female Performer	Most Popular Male Performer
**Riley Reid**; Diamond Jackson; Angela White; Dillion Harper; Moriah Mills; Mia Malkova; Kimmy Granger; Brandi Love; Nicole Aniston; Lisa Ann; Lana Rhoades; Madison Ivy	**Jordi El Niño Polla**; Lexington Steele; Johnny Sins; Bruce Venture; Mandingo; Chad White; Tyler Nixon; James Deen; Manuel Ferrara; Danny D; Mark Rockwell; Owen Gray
Most Popular Female Performer By Women	Most Popular Male Performer By Women
**Mia Malkova**; Kendra Lust; Lindsey Love; Riley Reid; Ava Addams; Piper Perri; Lana Rhoades; Dani Daniels; Mandy Flores; Moriah Mills	**Johnny Sins**; Manuel Ferrara; Jmac; Xander Corvus; Owen Gray; Isiah Maxwell; Keiran Lee; Jordi El Nino Polla; Danny D; Mandingo
Celebrity of the Year	Visionary Director
**Lena The Plug**; Justin Bieber; Selena Gomez; Tana Mongeau; Bella Thorne; Kim Kardashian; Kylie Jenner; Emily Ratajkowski; Meghan Markle; Cardi B	**Young M.A**
Top Big Tits Performer	Top BBW Performer
**Lena Paul**; Katie Banks; Ella Knox; Nicolette Shea; Sarah Banks; Angela White; Victoria June; MadeinCanarias; ThicciVelvet; BeaYork	**Jade Jordan**; OliviaJaide; XBeautifulAss; JewlieSparxx; Weluvbbws; Bellatina18; Bbwbreanna; LovelyHaley; Almond91; Karla Lane
Top MILF Performer	Top Big Dick Performer
**Brandi Love**; Cherie DeVille; Ava Addams; Julia Ann; Diamond Jackson; Lauren Phillips; Kendra Lust; Cory Chase; Lady Fyre; Alexis Fawx	**Manuel Ferrara**; Xander Corvus; Chris Strokes; Mandingo; Mike Adriano; Isiah Maxwell; Mark Rockwell; Danny D; Prince Yahshua; Johnny Sins
Top Threesome Performer	Top Gangbang Performer
**Lady Fyre**	**Riley Reid**; Megan Rain; Kagney Linn Karter; Jada Stevens; Abella Danger; Lady Fyre; Carolina Sweets; Lily Rader; Adriana Chechik; Veronica Avluv
Top Lesbian Performer	Most Popular Gay Performer
**Vanessa Veracruz**; Abigail Mac; Lily Cade; Cherie Deville; Jenna Sativa; Angela White; Charlotte Stokely; Elsa Jean; RosieAndAlena	**William Seed**; Broccolibutts; Darius Ferdynand; Cutler X; Austin Wolf; Johnny Rapid; Armond Rizzo; Diego Sans; TwoLongHorns; Potter011
Most Popular Trans Performer	Most Popular Gay Channel
**Natalie Mars**; Mia Isabella; Mandy Mitchell; Chanel Santini; Venus Lux; Bailey Jay; Sarina Valentina; Aubrey Kate; Jessy Dubai; VicaTS; Domino Presley; Jonelle Brooks	**Family Dick**
Most Popular Trans Channel	Most Popular European Channel
**Shemale Idol**	**Fake Taxi**
Top Channel	Most Popular Cinematic Channel
**Brazzers**	**Blacked**

=== Additional award winners ===
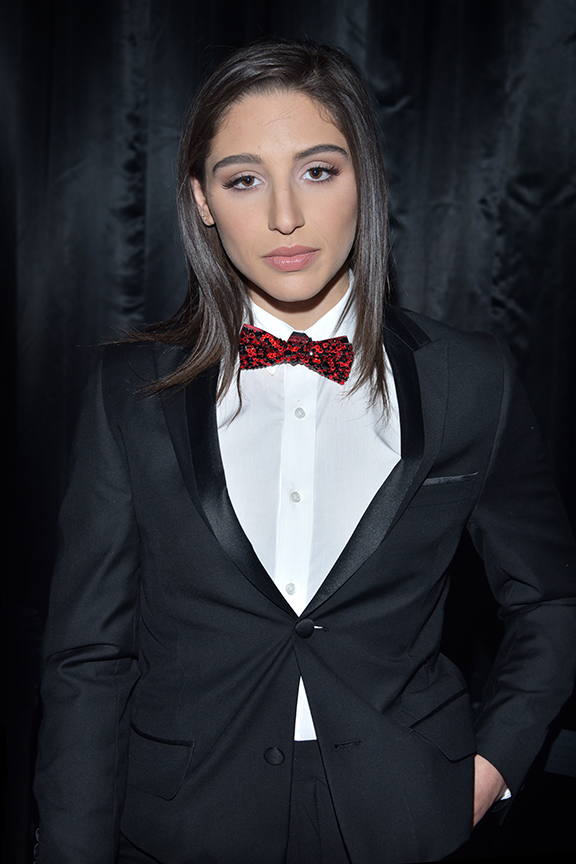
Abella Danger – winner of Top Squirting Performer

- Realer Than Reality—Top VR Performer: Megan Rain
- Up Close And Personal—Top POV Performer: Mark Rockwell
- Most Popular Network: Team Skeet
- Blowjob Queen—Top Blowjob Performer: Miss Banana
- Splash Zone—Top Squirting Performer: Abella Danger
- Back Door Beauty—Top Anal Performer: Danika Mori
- Most Popular Parody Channel: Wood Rocket
- Most Popular MILF Channel: Moms Teach Sex
- Most Popular VR Channel: BaDoinkVR
- Tantalizing Twinkie—Top Twink Performer: Joey Mills
- Glorious Grizzly—Top Bear Performer: Colby Jansen
- The Whole Squad—Top Gay Group Performer: Johnny Rapid
- Blowjob King—Top Gay Blowjob Performer: Darius Ferdynand
- Top Comment on Pornhub: PhatCockRocket
- Get Your Freak On—Top Fetish Performer: Prettykittymiaos
- Mrs. Dressup—Top Cosplay Performer: Mattie Doll
- Solo Siren—Top Female Solo Performer: Lilcanadiangirl
- Most Popular Verified Amateur: Lindsey Love
- Most Popular Verified Professional Model: Bryci
- Most Popular Verified Couple: LeoLulu

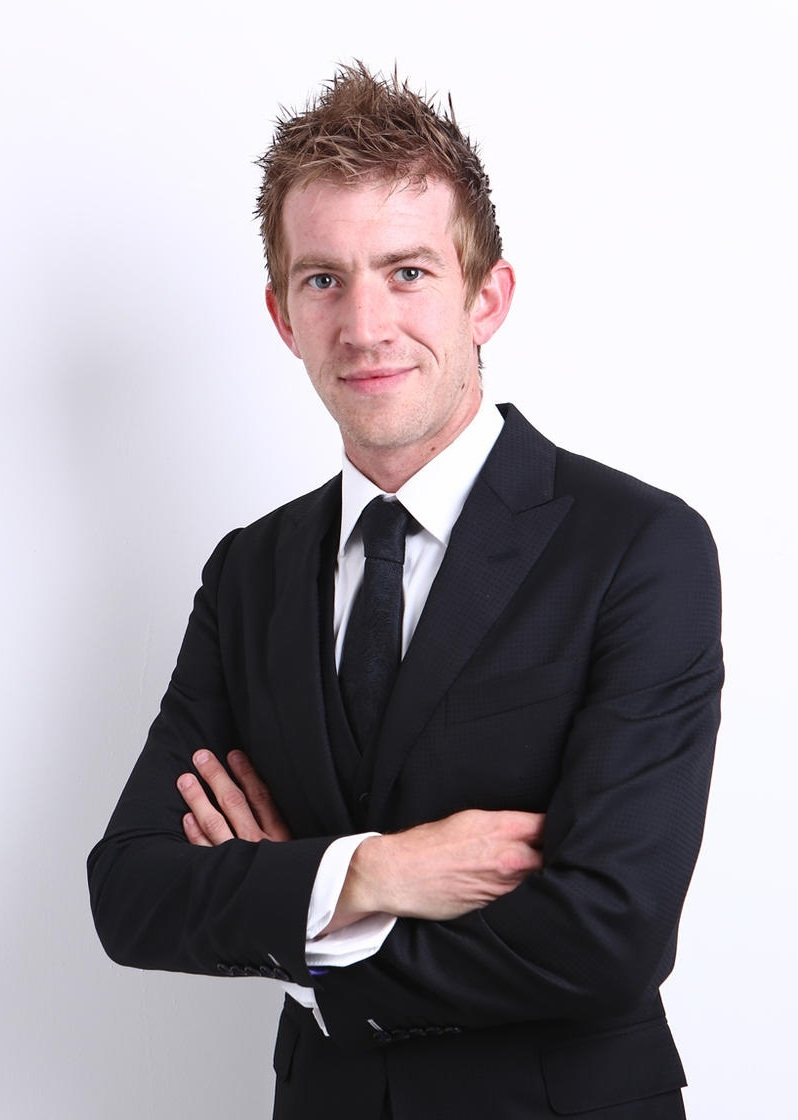
Danny D – winner of Best Cumshot

=== Fan award winners ===
- Best Dick (Fan Award): Johnny Sins
- Nicest Pussy (Fan Award): Dillion Harper
- Nicest Tits (Fan Award): Kendra Sunderland
- Hottest Female Ass (Fan Award): Mia Malkova
- Hottest Male Ass (Fan Award): Johnny Sins
- Best Cumshot (Fan Award): Danny D
- Hottest Inked Model (Fan Award): Karmen Karma
- Favorite MILF (Fan Award): Brandi Love
- Favorite Trans Model (Fan Award): Natalie Mars
- Favorite Gay Model (Fan Award): William Seed
- Favorite BBW Model (Fan Award): Marilyn Mayson
- Favorite Fetish Model (Fan Award): Mandy Flores
- Cam Performer of the Year (Fan Award): Jenny Blighe
- Favorite Channel (Fan Award): Brazzers
- Funniest Performer (Fan Award): Jordi El Niño Polla
- Best Premium Snapchat (Fan Award): Dani Daniels
- Best Porn Twitter (Fan Award): Riley Reid
- Instagrammer of the Year (Fan Award): Nicolette Shea

== Production ==
On August 7, 2018 Pornhub announced Asa Akira would host the award show. In early September 2018 reports stated Kanye West would be a creative director for the show. On September 3, 2018 Pornhub and West confirmed the partnership. Unlike other award shows such as the AVN's or XBIZ Awards winners would be decided on users streaming data from the website. The data compiled from mid-March 2018 until the day before the show on September 5 were used to find the winners of the categories. There was also a fan award portion which fans vote in a poll-style system from mid-August 2018 until the event in September on pornhub.com.

Kanye West and Teyana Taylor performed at the show. The show was held at the Belasco Theater in Downtown Los Angeles.
