= Lana (given name) =

- Gender: Female

Origin
- Origin: Gaelic (Irish/Scottish), Russian, Hawaiian
- Meaning: Path (Scottish Gaelic); Precious Child (Irish/Scottish Gaelic, derived); Calm (Hawaiian)

Other names
- Related names: Svetlana, Alana

Lana is a female given name and short name of multiple origins. It is found most frequently in the English-speaking countries, and as a short form of several names, including the Russian name Svetlana, the Gaelic name Alana, and other names ending with "-lana."

The name is also related to the Scottish word Làna, meaning "path" in Scottish Gaelic.

The name's use in Gaelic may also be connected to the Scottish and Irish Gaelic word leanabh (meaning "child" or "infant"). The endearing term a leanabh means "precious child".

In the English-speaking world, the name gained popularity through the 20th-century actress Lana Turner.

== Notable people ==
=== Actors ===
- Lana Albeik (born 1995), Palestinian-Syrian model and actress
- Lana Barić (born 1979), Croatian actress
- Lana Clarkson (1962–2003), American actress and fashion model
- Lana Condor (born 1997), American actress
- Lana Golja, Australian actress
- Lana Marconi (1917–1990), Romanian-French actress, born Ecaterina Ileana Marcovici
- Lana Morris (1930–1998), English actress
- Lana Nodin (born 1979), Malaysian actress and model
- Lana Parrilla (born 1977), American actress
- Lana Rhoades (born 1996), American actress, podcaster, social-media personality
- Lana Turner (1921–1995), American actress, born Julia Jean Turner
- Lana Wachowski (born 1965), American director
- Lana Wood (born 1946), American actress best known for her role as 'Plenty O'Toole' in the 1971 James Bond film Diamonds Are Forever

=== Politics ===
- Lana Gogoberidze (born 1928), Georgian politician and film director
- Lana Gordon (born 1950), American politician from Kansas
- Lana Greenfield (born 1951), American politician from South Dakota
- Lana Hurdle, American public official
- Lana Jalosjos, Filipino politician
- Lana Ladd Stokan (born 1958), American politician
- Lana Lokteff (born 1979), American political YouTuber
- Lana Mamkegh, Jordanian politician and journalist
- Lana Marks (born 1953), American business executive, diplomat and fashion designer
- Lana Myers, American judge from Texas
- Lana Nusseibeh, Emirati politician
- Lana Popham (born 1968), Canadian politician from British Columbia
- Lana Theis (born 1965), American politician from Michigan

=== Singers ===
- Lana Cantrell (born 1943), Australian-American singer and entertainment lawyer
- Lana Chapel, American singer-songwriter
- Lana Del Rey, (born 1985), American singer
- Lana Gordon, American singer
- Lana Jurčević (born 1984), Croatian singer
- Lana Lane, American singer
- Lana Lo, American singer
- Lana Lubany (born 1996), Palestinian singer-songwriter
- Lana Mir, Ukrainian singer-songwriter
- Lana Moorer (born 1970), American rapper, DJ, actress and entrepreneur
- Lana Trotovšek (born 1983), Slovenian violinist
- Lana Wolf (born 1975), Dutch singer

=== Sports ===
- Lana Bagen (born 1996), British figure skater
- Lana Clelland (born 1993), Scottish footballer
- Lana du Pont (born 1939), American equestrian
- Lana Feras (born 1998), Jordanian footballer
- Lana Franković (born 1991), Croatian handball player
- Lana Gehring (born 1990), American short track speed skater
- Lana Golob (born 1999), Slovenian footballer
- Lana Gorgadze (born 1997), Georgian footballer
- Lana Harch (born 1984), Australian soccer player
- Lana Jēkabsone (born 1974), Latvian hurdler
- Lana Jurina (born 2005), Croatian handball player
- Lana Lawless (born 1953), American professional golfer
- Lana Popadić (born 1983), Croatian tennis player
- Lana Pudar (born 2006), Bosnian-Herzegovinian swimmer
- Lana Skeledžija (born 1982), Croatian sport shooter
- Lana, real name Catherine Joy Perry (born 1985), American professional wrestler in WWE

=== Other fields ===
- Lana Abdel Rahman, Lebanese writer and journalist
- Lana Bastašić (born 1986), Serbian writer, novelist and translator
- Lana Citron (born 1969), Irish novelist, poet, short story writer, and screenwriter
- Lana Coc-Kroft (born 1967), New Zealand television and radio personality, and Miss Universe New Zealand 1988
- Lana Gay, Canadian radio personality and music journalist
- Lana Jones, Australian ballet dancer
- Lana Lopesi, New Zealand writer and critic
- Lana Montalbán, Argentine journalist, TV anchor, and producer
- Lana Obad (born 1988), winner of Miss Croatia 2010

== Fictional characters ==
=== In film and television ===
- Lana, a prostitute in 1983 film Risky Business, played by Rebecca De Mornay
- Lana, a Trial Captain in both the video game and anime versions of Pokémon Sun and Moon
- Lana in Hyrule Warriors and Hyrule Warriors Legends
- Lana Crawford in Neighbours, played by Bridget Neval
- Lana Herman, Theo's dream girl in The Cosby Show
- Lana Isavia in the anime TV series Super Dimension Cavalry Southern Cross
- Lana Jacobs in Shortland Street, played by Brook Williams
- Lana Lamore, a film actress employed by Dr. Claw and the antagonist of "Movie Set", season 1, episode 12 of Inspector Gadget (1983)
- Lana Lang in the television series Smallville, played by Kristin Kreuk
- Lana Lazar in the Gone novel series
- Lana Loud in the animated TV series The Loud House
- Lana Kane in TV series Archer, played by Aisha Tyler
- Lana Shields, a character on Three's Company
- Lana Winters in American Horror Story: Asylum, played by Sarah Paulson

=== In literature ===
- Llana of Gathol, four-part series by Edgar Rice Burroughs
- Lana Lang in DC Comics Superman
- Wild Energy. Lana, a 2006 Ukrainian fantasy novel

=== In music ===
- "Lana", sung by Roy Orbison
- "Lana", sung by The Beach Boys

=== In video games ===
- Lana Beniko, in Star Wars: The Old Republic
- Lana, in Pokémon Sun and Moon and Pokémon Ultra Sun and Ultra Moon
- Lana Skye, in Phoenix Wright: Ace Attorney

== See also ==
- Lana, chimpanzee used in language research
- Lana (disambiguation)
