= Danny D =

English pornographic actor and director (born 1987)

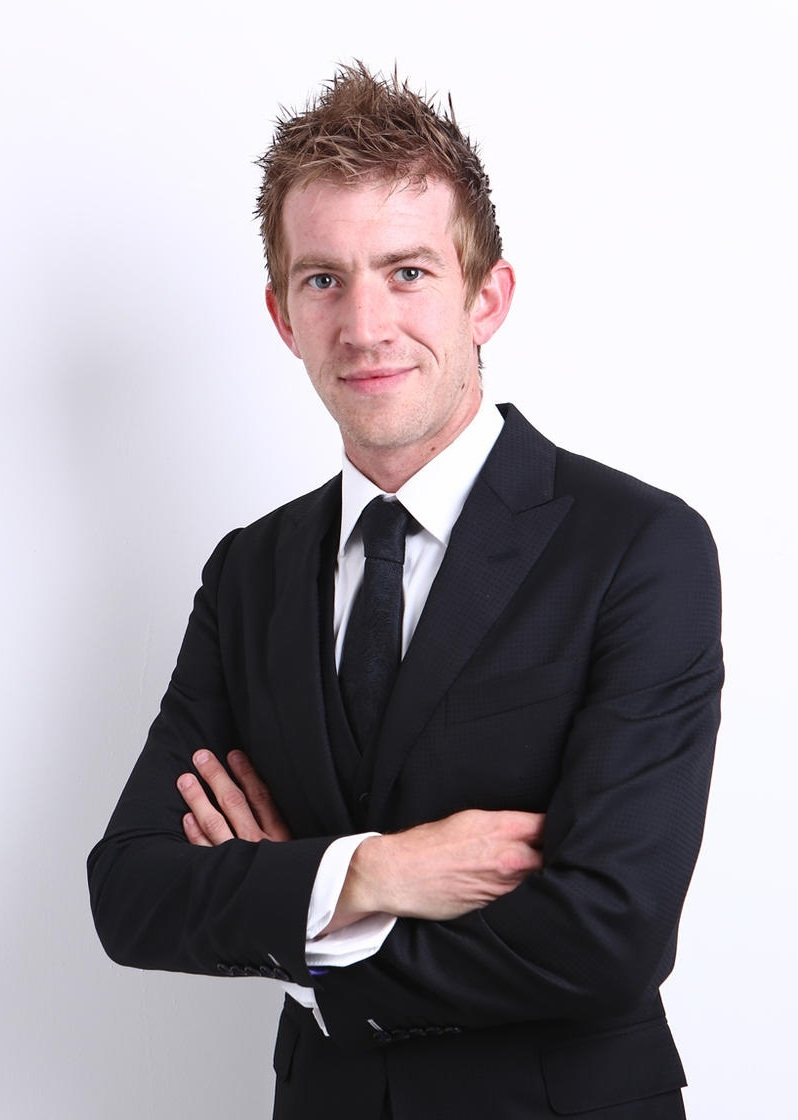
- Danny D in 2015
- Born: Daniel Terry Martin; 11 August 1987 (age 39); Maidstone, Kent, England
- Other names: Matt Hughes; Danny Dong
- Occupations: Pornographic film actor; director; producer
- Years active: 2006–present
- Employer: Brazzers
- Height: 5 ft 11 in (1.80 m)
- Spouse: Sophia Knight (m. 2015, divorced)
- Children: 1
- Website: www.danny-d.com

Daniel Terry Martin (born 11 August 1987), better known as Danny D, is an English pornographic actor, director and producer, known primarily for his work for Brazzers. After beginning his career in gay pornography, he transitioned into straight pornography and has gone on to appear in over 1,500 adult films. He is one of the highest-paid pornographic actors in the United Kingdom and has received a number of awards for his work, including at the AVN and XBIZ Awards.

== Early life ==
Danny D was born Daniel Terry Martin in Maidstone, Kent on 11 August 1987. Prior to beginning his career in pornography, Martin previously worked as a builder. Whilst on holiday with friends to Germany for the World Cup in 2006, as the queue to the portaloos was too long and Martin needed to urinate, he decided to go in a nearby field. It was here that one of his friends saw his penis after he was urinating in the field. The friend was surprised at the size of his penis, asking him what was wrong with it. After this, the friend went to the rest of Martin's friends and talked about the size of his penis. Danny D said he previously hadn’t realised that he had a larger penis than usual until he compared it with other friends. During the holiday, Danny D and friends discussed what careers he could follow with his larger-than-average penis. An initial idea was for him to model for Calvin Klein, with the idea being that the size of his bulge when wearing the boxers would make people want to buy the boxers. Another career suggestion was being a male gigolo, and the idea of becoming a pornstar was discussed. He admitted that, being only 18, he had ‘no idea what he was doing’ in terms of sex, having been with a couple of women previously. Martin stated that despite previous partners commenting on the size of his penis, he assumed that it was ‘just sex talk’. He subsequently attended to a swinging club and went dogging, to see if he could perform in front of others. After attending a swinging party, D had sex with another man’s wife, to which the man remarked that he would pay him to be filmed having sex with his wife again. The couple lived in France and he took time off work, being flown out there to film. He spoke about the experience on the Ladbible TV podcast, Extraordinary Lives:

“It was more confusing, the fact that he [the woman’s husband], wasn’t going to punch me in the face, you know, cause [sic], I wasn’t from that world of, you know, wife sharing and stuff like that.”

— Danny D, Extraordinary Lives podcast, June 14, 2023

He recounted how he was ‘really nervous’, and whilst staying with the couple, they drove out to a wooded area to film a scene in the back of their car. He stated that he was ‘blown away’, as he counted the money, remarking that being paid to be filmed having sex was ‘a thing’. There and then, the man asked if him wanted to shoot another scene and be paid again, to which he agreed and ten minutes later, he shot another scene. Martin was paid €150 and the man told him that every time he returned and was filmed, he would pay him again. After this, Martin told his mother about his new-found career, but stated that he didn’t want to tell his extended family in case the career didn’t work out. He stated that he had always had an open discourse with his mother, who had been friendly about it, describing her as being ‘super supportive’, with him telling her ‘right from the get-go’ about the offer he’d been given of going to France to shoot a scene with a man’s wife. Martin initially told a girlfriend at the time that he was a poker player, to account for him going away for the day and returning with a lot of money (she later found out about his actual career).

== Career ==
=== 2006–2010: Career beginnings and gay pornography ===
Martin subsequently embarked on a career in pornography. He remarked that it was quite difficult to get started within the adult industry. When he started, there was one forum for ‘Adult Producers’, compared to a stark contrast to the present day, where information about the industry is readily available on social media sites, such as Reddit and X. From this forum, he messaged other performers and producers and Martin was able to network, posting the work he had done with other companies to show that he was able to do the job, despite being new.

Martin stated that he thought the size of his penis helped him get ‘through the door’, but remarked on the saying ‘you’re only as good as your last scene’, which was more important when starting out, a consideration he had in order to be invited back for further work. He stated that he felt he was just ‘having fun’ when he first started and didn’t consider what was on the line for the scene he was in to be good. He initially became involved in amateur porn films and other productions. Some of his initial work included solo scenes and ‘gay for pay’. This included initially starting with masturbating next to another man and Martin's logic was that if he could have anal sex with a woman, then ‘an arsehole’s an arsehole’, meaning he could have sex with men. One of his first notable scenes was the 2006 englishlads.com film 'Str8 Biker Boy Matt’s 1 Footer’, and he went on to appear in several more gay porn scenes under the alias Matt Hughes.

Martin stated there were times early within his career where he ‘wasn’t doing great’ and was trying to get work. He stated that when he needed money early on in his career, he did work at sex parties, recounting that for one event, he got naked into a wooden box, with holes in the box with marigold gloves attached, where guests could put their hands into the gloves and touch him, with Martin recounting that he and other performers would do three one-hour shifts, within the boxes, at ‘some rich dude’s party’. He recounted that one month, a couple of years into his career, he wasn’t getting work and had to call his mother, asking her to borrow money for rent. Visiting her son, Martin's mother talked with him as to whether he should consider getting a different career, thinking that porn wasn’t a long-term career. He remembered being ‘confused’ by that, adding that ‘it took a lot to make it work’. Martin states that since he started to the present day, he gets nervous with every scene he does but thinks it is a good thing and something that he can use to his advantage. He stated that on one occasion, whilst he was still new in the industry, he was in a scene with three women and was self-aware that, in ‘real life’, he couldn’t have ‘pulled’ the woman he was working with and he couldn’t get aroused, putting this down to nervousness. He stated it was ‘a horrendous place to be as a male performer’, with the pressure of things such as members of the crew waiting, the location only being booked until a certain time. He learnt that it was about knowing himself and his body and taking a minute if required—he later returned to the scene after a short break. On a related note, Martin worked out ‘quite early on’ that he couldn’t have a particular fetish, such as large breasts, as he may not always be working with someone with them. He therefore had to think of something he could always think about that every person had and for him, he focused on getting aroused by the protruding bones of the people he worked with.

Martin stated that the job gave him an awareness about his body, including signs that he may ejaculate prematurely. In order to avoid this ‘excitement’, he originally would walk off set; however, as he got older within the industry, he realized that this meant a take would have to be redone due to things being in different positions. To overcome any ‘excitement’, he stated that he may change positions or acts within the scene, which meant it kept the scene flowing, but gave him a minute to ‘calm down’ on what was exciting him.

Early in his career, Martin stated that he was able to separate his emotions from the sex he had at work. He compared how porn sets were quite ’sterile’, with a clear, professional idea that people were there to ‘make a product’. Although chemistry and passion existed within a scene, it wasn’t like that ‘from the get-go’. Describing it as ‘cold’, he stated that it felt a ‘bit transactional’, and different, for example, from meeting someone within a club, where there’s a ‘chase’ element. Outside of work, Martin stated that it was quite hard to have a relationship, with there having to be a lot of understanding, communication and trust. He stated that when he was younger in the industry, he wasn’t as open as he could have been; however, as he had got older within the industry, he had learnt more about himself and understand that honesty was ‘the key’ in a relationship. Martin stated that when he first started in the industry, a person would be happy to sleep with him, as he was a pornstar, as it was a way a person could ‘tick it off the bucket list’. However, Martin found that the person wouldn’t want to have a ‘date’ or ‘allow themselves to fall for you’ on a romantic level, which he found difficult. However, he stated that he reminded himself why he was in his career, staying true to himself and remaining happy. He stated that if someone was going to love him for him, he would have to be honest and truthful with that person as to not only what job he did, but why he did it, meaning that it ‘didn’t necessarily mean’ that he would be cheating on his partner, but it was his career. He added that a person would be ‘more than welcome’ to join him on set, to see how ‘cold’ it was at times and not the perception that people had.

=== 2011–present: Straight pornography, Brazzers and other work ===
In 2010, Martin began working with Television X, with his first features being in the films Power Girls and This Porn Life'. In 2011, he started working with Brazzers, with his first features being Release The Stress, What The Butler Saw, CUMatose and Help I’m In A Porno Film. He stated in the Extraordinary Lives podcast that this was an important moment in his career:

“I think when Brazzers came along, they changed my life. They’re an amazing company to work for and when they came, they kind of put, you know, a real stamp on what we [sic] was doing, you know, really kind of gave me the sort of push to work for the best companies, do the best I could do in my performing and stuff like that."

— Danny D, Extraordinary Lives podcast, June 14, 2023

Martin added that Brazzers arranged a visa for him, taking him to Las Vegas and Los Angeles, and to other parts of the world, including Argentina. It was from being involved with Brazzers that Martin saw his career as a viable option. It was with Brazzers that Martin started to work with different crews and ‘bigger name’ actresses.

Martin has since worked with other production companies, including Digital Playground, and Evil Angel.

Martin stated that due to the group scenes, ‘the edge’ was taken off, as the camera could only focus on one thing, however, there were more people that he had to interact with.

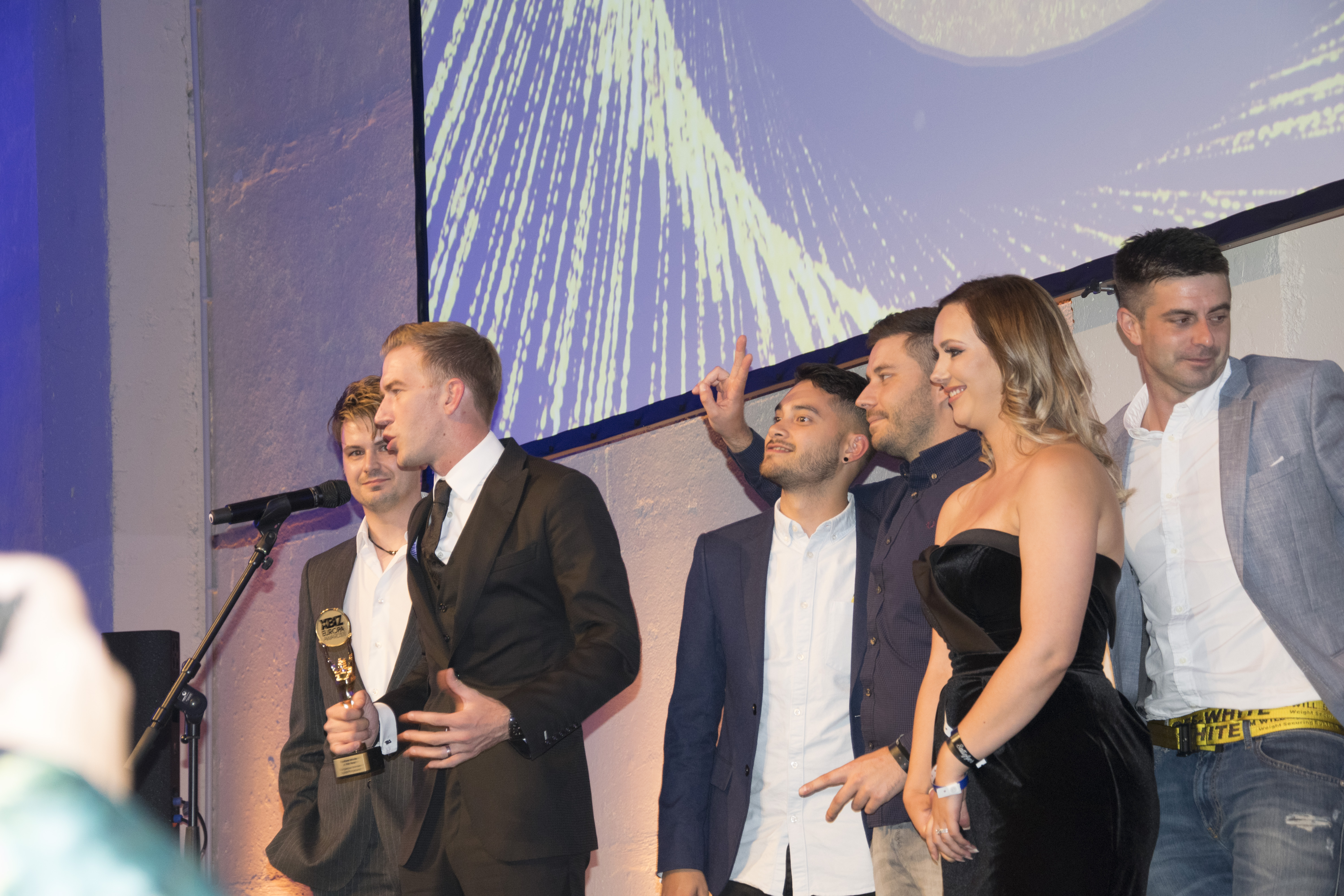
Danny D at the XBIZ Awards Europa in September 2019, after winning the award for Best Feature

In 2017, Martin joined OnlyFans. In 2020, he made a cameo appearance in the Channel 4 drama series Adult Material as Sam Pike. The series documented a woman's life in the adult film industry. In 2022, he stated that he made approximately £20,000 a month from posting on the site, adding that his audience was mainly male. He stated that OnlyFans was a side project for him, away from his main role within porn acting and producing. Martin compared this to when he started, stating that it was now easier with sites like OnlyFans, that a person could create a portfolio of work more easily.

In 2022, Martin and fellow pornographic actor Dick Bush started the ‘Smash City’ podcast.

Whilst helping to script a scene is enjoyable for Martin, he stated that he prefers building ‘worlds’ for his films. He has stated that he will often walk around IKEA and turn things upside down, remarking that a cutlery tray turned upside down and spray painted could look like a ‘space wall’. He has admitted to trying to build bigger sets and more interesting plots, such as big featurettes and production series. This included building a spaceship inside a studio, which took him just under two months to build, for the 2023 Digital Playground series, 'Deeper Space'. He has filmed other scenes inside a nuclear bunker. Martin stated that he ‘really enjoyed’ the building side to the project. As of February 2024, Danny D was rated number 69 in the model rankings on Pornhub, with his profile having been viewed 22,234,828 times. His videos have had over a billion views.

He stated at times, sometimes his job felt like a ‘job’ and at other times, it felt like ‘the most amazing job in the world’ and he didn’t feel like he was working. In August 2024, he appeared on GK Barry's podcast Saving Grace. He has also appeared in amateur porn scenes with Bonnie Blue and Lily Phillips.

== Personal life ==
Martin has stated he doesn’t like the word ‘pornstar’, telling the Extraordinary Lives podcast by LADbible TV in 2023: “It’s a strange definition as a title” adding “if you worked in movies, you wouldn’t call yourself a movie-star; you’re an actor.”

Martin married fellow porn actor Sophia Knight in July 2015, after meeting on a porn set in Inverness in 2012. He stated that his wife understood what his job was and there was a ‘working relationship’. They later divorced, but it is unknown when this occurred. He stated that him and his ex-wife were still friends. Whilst on the Extraordinary Lives podcast, it was reported that he had re-married; it is not known when this occurred, however he is in a relationship with Liss Lacao. He has one child.

== Public image ==
Martin is known for his large penis, though reports have differed on its size. News outlets reported that his penis is 9.5 inches in length. however a 10.6-inch (27-centimetre) dildo, known as the 'Secret Weapon', was allegedly cast from his penis and is for sale. He stated on the Extraordinary Lives podcast that his penis was 10.5 inches.

Martin has stated that there are issues with having a larger penis, such as sitting on it.

He stated that the ‘biggest gripe’ he has is toilets in the United States of America, as when he sits downs to go to the toilet, his penis goes within the water of the toilet, due to the higher water level of US toilets compared with UK toilets. He states that with other toilets, his penis touches the bowl. He states that if he sits down, he has to hold his penis up.

Martin stated that underwear can be an issue if it doesn't have a pouch. He stated there is underwear designed for men with bigger penises, describing it as: “The most comfortable thing I’ve ever seen”. He stated that Speedos were a ‘no-go’.

Martin stated another issue was grey sweatpants, as people assume that he is ‘excited’, despite not being. Fellow adult performer Rebecca Goodwin stated on the Saving Grace podcast in 2023, that she had done three scenes with Martin and that over Johnny Sins, Martin was her favourite actor to work with, stating that he had ‘so much banter’.

Goodwin stated that when attempting to give Martin a blowjob in a scene, she couldn’t do it, stating she felt ‘so incompetent’, only being able to get around the tip of his penis. She stated in another scene when had vaginal sex with Martin, she was ‘fine’, having previously given birth to two children and working with large sex toys. Goodwin stated that in another scene with Martin where they had anal sex, she had poppers under the pillow, stating she had to ‘sniff poppers every two minutes’, describing the scene as ‘an experience’. She stated that afterwards, she got piles.

== Selected filmography ==
Year	Title	Production company
2007	RudeBoiz 8: Hung Ladz XXL	Rudeboiz
2007	Indieboyz 2	Eurocreme
2007	11 Inch Fuck Stud	Eurocreme
2008	Straight Butt Bangers	Eurocreme
2008	PartyBoy	Eurocreme
2009	Hung Ladz 3: Hard Shooters	Eurocreme
2009	Huge and Horny	Eurocreme
2009	Horse Hung and Horny	Eurocreme
2009	All Girls Do It	Harmony Films
2009	Dollz House	Harmony Films
2010	Not in My House	Brazzers
2010	Young Harlots: Bad Behavior	Harmony Films
2011	Sorry Daddy, Whitezilla Split My Little Asshole 2	Hush Hush Entertainment
2011	Lust For Young Busts	Harmony Films
2011	Informers	Daring
2011	Dirty Little Club Sluts	Harmony Films
2012	Young Harlots: Naughty Tutorials	Harmony Films
2012	Whore Hotel	Harmony Films
2012	Slam It in a Slut 2	Harmony Films
2012	Big Butts Like It Big 10	Brazzers
2012	The Royal Romp	Television X
2012	The Last Shag	Dorcel
2015	Sherlock: A XXX Parody	Digital Playground
2016	Power Bangers: A Brazzers XXX Parody	Brazzers
2017	Queen of Thrones: A Brazzers XXX Parody	Brazzers
2017	How I Fucked Your Mother: A DP XXX Parody	Digital Playground
2017	After Porn Ends 2	Documentary
2018	Bewitcher: A DP XXX Parody	Digital Playground
2018	Hand Solo: A DP XXX Parody	Digital Playground
2018	Poon Raider: A DP XXX Parody	Digital Playground
2018	Nevermore	Digital Playground
2019	Dangerous Women	Digital Playground
2019	Hot Nights Cold Blood	Digital Playground
2019	No Mercy For Mankind	Digital Playground
2020	Pulse	Digital Playground
2023	Best of ZZ - Danny D	Brazzers
2024	Ghosted	Digital Playground
2024	Scandalous	Digital Playground
2025	Uncaged	Digital Playground
2025	Clash of the Vikings	Digital Playground

== Awards and nominations ==
Year	Award	Category	Film	Result	Ref
2024	Fan Award	Favourite Male Porn Star		Nominated	
2024	AVN Award	Best Actor - Featurette	The Chosen Nymph	Nominated	
2024	AVN Award	Best Supporting Actor	Space Junk	Won	
2024	AVN Award	Hall Of Fame - Video Branch		Won	
2023	AVN Award	Best Actor -Featurette	Crooked Throne	Nominated	
2023	AVN Award	Best International Male/Female Sex Scene	Brother Bangs The Bride-To-Be	Nominated	
2023	AVN Award	Best Directing Portfolio - International		Nominated	
2023	AVN Award	International Male Performer of the Year		Won	
2023	XRCO Award	Best Comedy	Deeper Space	Nominated	
2023	XBIZ Europa Awards	Best Sex Scene - Feature	Pornstars In Space	Won	
2022	XBIZ Europa Awards	Best Acting	Deeper Space	Won	
2020	XBIZ Awards	Foreign Male Performer of the Year		Won	
2020	AVN Award	Best Director - Foreign Production	Uninvited	Nominated	
2020	AVN Award	Best Leading Actor	Univited	Nominated	
2019	Pornhub Awards	Most Popular Male Pornstar By Women		Nominated	
2019	XBIZ Europa Awards	Best Actor	Dangerous Women	Won	
2018	AVN Award	Most Outrageous Sex Scene	Bulldogs	Nominated	
2018	AVN Award	Best Actor	Bulldogs	Nominated	
2018	AVN Award	Best Actor	Sherlock: A XXX Parody	Nominated	
2018	XBIZ Europa Award	Best Actor	Nevermore	Won	
2018	XBIZ Europa Award	Best Sex Scene - Feature Movie	Hand Solo: A DP XXX Parody	Won	
2018	Pornhub Awards	Most Popular Male Performer		Nominated	
2018	Pornhub Awards	Most Popular Male Performer By Women		Nominated	
2018	Pornhub Awards	Top Big Dick Performer		Nominated	
2018	Pornhub Awards	Best Cumshot (Fan Award)		Won	
2017	AVN Award	Best Sex Scene in a Foreign-Shot Production	Sherlock: A XXX Parody	Nominated	
2017	AVN Award	Best Sex Scene in a Foreign-Shot Production	Lost in Brazzers	Nominated	
2016	AVN Award	Best Sex Scene in a Foreign-Shot Production	The Doctor	Won	
2016	AVN Award	Best Actor	The Doctor	Nominated	
2016	XBIZ Awards	Foreign Male Performer Of The Year		Won	
2014	XBIZ Awards	Foreign Male Performer Of The Year		Won	
2010	AVN Award	Best Group Scene	Satan's Whore	Nominated	

== See also ==
- List of British pornographic actors
