= Lanna (disambiguation) =

Lanna was a kingdom in northern Thailand from the 13th to 18th centuries.

Lanna may also refer to:

- Lanna people, or Northern Thai, an ethnic group native to the former kingdom
- Lanna language, or Northern Thai language, spoken in the area of the former kingdom
- Lanna script, or Tai Tham, a script used for languages of the region
- Northern Thailand, the center of the former kingdom called Lanna

== Places ==
- Lanna, Lekeberg, Sweden
- Lanna, Värnamo, Sweden
- Länna, a locality in Uppsala County, Sweden

== People ==
- Lanna (given name)
- Lanna (surname)

== Other uses ==
- 6928 Lanna, a main-belt asteroid
- Vila Lanna, a neo-Renaissance building in Prague, Czech Republic

== See also ==
- Lana (disambiguation)
- Lanner (disambiguation)
- Nalan (disambiguation) or Na-lan
