= Sokan =

Sokan may refer to:

Concepts

- Sōkan, a Japanese system of rankings for Buddhist clergy
- Sokan, a form of lightsaber combat in the Star Wars fictional universe
- Royal tonsure ceremony, known in Thai as sokan

People

- Shinmen Sokan (16th century), daimyō, a head of the Japanese clan of Shinmen
- Yamazaki Sōkan (1465–1553), aka Sōkan, Japanese poet of renga and haikai
- Lana Ladd Stokan, American politician from Missouri

Places

- Sokan, Iran (disambiguation)
