= Lana =

Lana may refer to:

- Lana (given name)
- Francesco Lana de Terzi (1631–1687), Italian Jesuit priest and scientist
- Lana (singer), Russian singer-songwriter
- Lana Del Rey, American singer-songwriter
- Lana Turner, American actress
- Lana Rhoades, American former adult film actress
- CJ Perry, professional wrestler and pro wrestling manager, who formerly competed under the ring-name 'Lana'
- Wild Energy. Lana, a 2006 Ukrainian fantasy novel

== Sciences ==
- LANA, Latency-associated nuclear antigen
- Lana (chimpanzee), a language research chimpanzee
- Lana (foraminifera), a genus of protists

== Music ==
- Lana, an album by Lana Jurčević
- SOS Deluxe: Lana, a 2024 reissue album by SZA
- "Lana", a song by Roy Orbison from his album Crying
- "Lana", song by The Beach Boys from their 1963 album Surfin' U.S.A.

== Geography ==
- Lana, South Tyrol, municipality in autonomous province South Tyrol, Italy
- Lana, Navarre, town and municipality in the province and autonomous community of Navarre, Spain
- Lanë, stream in Tirana, Albania

== See also ==
- Lānaʻi, the sixth-largest of the Hawaiian Islands, also known as the Pineapple Island
- Lanna (disambiguation)
- Lanner (disambiguation)
- Larna, Asturias, Spain
