= 7th Transgender Erotica Awards =

US adult entertainment industry award

- Date: February 15, 2015
- Site: Avalon Hollywood, California
- Hosted by: Jujubee

Highlights
- Best Film: Shemale Secret Service (Grooby)
- Most awards: Kelly Klaymour and Jessy Dubai (2 each)
- Most nominations: Bailey Jay (5)

The 7th Annual Transgender Erotica Awards was a pornographic awards event recognizing the best in transgender pornography form the previous year from November 1, 2013, to October 1, 2014. the nominees were announced on October 16, 2014, online on the theteashow.com website. The winners were announced during the awards on February 15, 2014. There were a total of 22 Award categories.

Between these awards and the previous awards, the name of the awards was changed from the Tranny Awards to the Transgender Erotica Awards. It was cited as being done to give off a less offensive name and to be more inclusive of all people involved in transgender erotica. The change of name was widely positively received by the attendees at the awards.

== Winners and nominees ==
The nominations for the 7th Transgender Erotica Awards were announced online and opened to fan voting on October 16, 2014, online on the theteashow.com website. The winners were announced during the awards on February 15, 2015.

=== Awards ===
Winners are listed first, highlighted in boldface.

| Best New Face | Best Solo Performer |
|---|---|
| **Kelly Klaymour**; Ada Black; Camilla La Princessa; Danika Haze; Evie Elliott; Holly Parker; Iris Indigo; Korra Del Rio; Kylie Maria; Laela Knight; Mia Davina; Miran; Rebeka Refuse | **Penny Tyler**; Aubrey Starr; Bailey Jay; Chelsea Marie; Crona Valentine; Delia Delions; Domino Presley; Gianna Rivera; Joanna Jet; Ryder Monroe; Sienna Grace; Stefani Special; Sunshyne Monroe; Trixxy Von Tease |
| Best Hardcore Performer | Ms. Unique |
| **Jessy Dubai**; Aubrey Kate; Chelsea Poe; Eva Cassini; Eva Lin; Honey Foxx; Kayla Biggs; Kelly Clare; Kelly Klaymour; Khloe Hart; Kylie Maria; Michelle Austin; Michelle Firestone; Nina Lawless; Tiffany Starr; Venus Lux | **Nina Lawless**; Ada Black; Ashley Paleta; Cat Taylor; Chelsea Marie; Crona Valentine; Iris Indigo; Koko; Korra Del Rio; Michelle Firestone; Mysty Skylar; Rebeka Refuse; Tori Mayes; Trixxy Von Tease; Wendy Summers |
| Best FTM Performer | Best FTM Scene |
| **James Darling**; Billy Castro; Chance Armstrong; Cyd St.Vincent; Dickey Johnson; Fritz Von Fuckup; Juicy; Parker Reed; Ramses Rodstein; Rex | **The Handyman** Delia Delions and Chance Armstrong from DeliaTS.com; Bailey Jay & James Darling - Bathhouse Cruising (Gino Genet & Connor McGuire) from Bonusholeboys.com; Courtney Trouble Fan Club #1 (Billy Castro & Courtney Trouble); Dormroom Fuck up (Fritz Von Fuckup & Michelle Austin); Kipp’s Frat Hazing (James Darling and Damien Moreau); The Casting Couch (Cyd St.Vincent & Mickey Mod) from Bonusholeboys.com; The Hitcher (Fritz & Owen Gray) from FTMFucker.com |
| Best Non-TS Performer | Best Non-US Performer |
| **Robert Axel**; Courtney Trouble; Christian; Giovanni; Jack Plowher; Ramon; Ruckus; Sebastian Keys; Smith; Soldier Boi; Spencer Fox; Wolf Hudson | **Miran**; Angelina Torres; Bruna Butterfly; Francine Gurchik; Jordan Jay; Liberty Harkness; Megumi; Misty Sklyar; Nikki Montero; Sheyla Wandegirlt; Veronica Bolina; Vitress Tamayo |
| Best DVD | Best Scene |
| **Shemale Secret Service** (Grooby); American Shemale X 6; Fucking Mystic (Trouble Films); I Kill It TS 6 (Trans 500); Next Shemale Idol 7 (Evil Angel); Shemale Idol Auditions (Evil Angel); Shemale Secret Services (Grooby); TS Playground 9 (Evil Angel); TS Playground 10 (Evil Angel); TS Babysitters (Devils); Transmen Adventures (Kennston Productions & FTMFucker); Tranny Chaser 2: Pool Boy (Grooby); Transsexual Gangbangers 18 (Devils) | **The 4-some - All TGirls Volume 1** – Shemale.xxx (Michelle Firestone, Nina Lawless, Chelsea Marie & Miranda Meadows); Delia, Tyra and Christian Threesome; Bailey Jay and Chelsea Poe; Kylie Maria and Robert Axel (Shemale.xxx); Stefani Special & Mandy Muse – TSPH; Tasha Jones & Dita; Kayla Biggs & Abel Arches – TS Seduction; Riley Quinn & Christian; Tiffany Starr & Ada Black 3-some; Eva Lin & Ramon – Trans 500; Venus Lux & Dana Vespoli – TS, I Love You (Evil Angel); Wendy Williams & Ramon – Trans 500; Aubrey Kate – Supergirl – Shemale.xxx; Honey Foxx & Alex Adams – TS Seduction; Jessy Dubai & Smith – Tranny Chaser 2 |
| Best Photographer | Best Scene Producer |
| **Radius Dark**; Amy Beckerman; Blackula; Bob Maverick; Ernie Black; Frank; James Johnson; Kalin; Kila Kali; Krista Michaels; Nick Milo; Omar Wax | **Blackula**; Buddy Wood; Courtney Trouble; Hiroshi; Jack Flash; Jamie French; Joanna Jet; Kevin Dong; Louie Damazo; Lucia Matthews; Omar Wax; Radius Dark; Remy Melanie |
| Best Solo Website | Best Internet Personality |
| **Jamie French**; Bailey Jay; Delia TS; Eva Cassini; TS-Jesse; Joanna Jet; Jordan Jay; Kelly Clare; Krissy 4U; Sunshyneland; Tempest Rockdoll; Tyra Scott; Wendy Summers; Venus Lux; Latina Tranny | **Bailey Jay**; Chelsea Poe; Delia Delions; Kelli Lox; Kelly Pierce; Sasha Strokes; Madison; Tasha Jones; Venus Lux; Wendy Summers |
| Best DVD Director | Transcendence Award |
| **Buddy Wood**; Courtney Trouble; James Darling; Jay Sin; Joey Silvera; Michelle Austin; Toni Meyer Hill; Radius Dark | **Tori Mayes** |
| Black Tgirls Model Of The Year | Bob's Tgirls Model Of The Year |
| **Kayla Biggs** | **Jessy Dubai** |
| Shemale Yum Model Of The Year | Shemale Strokers Model Of The Year |
| **Kylie Maria** | **Kelly Klaymour** |
Lifetime Achievement Award
**Foxxy** (performer) **Ed Hunter** (non-performer)
