= Armond Rizzo =

American pornographic actor

- Born: July 19, 1990 (age 36); Aurora, Illinois, U.S.
- Other name: Joey Rodriguez
- Occupations: Pornographic actor; model
- Years active: 2013–present
- Height: 4 ft 11 in (1.50 m)

Armond Rizzo (born July 19, 1990), previously Joey Rodriguez, is an American pornographic actor. Over the course of his career, he has won several awards, including two GayVN Awards and one Grabby Award, and was one of the most searched-for gay porn stars on Pornhub in the late 2010s.

== Early life ==
Rizzo was born on July 19, 1990, in Aurora, Illinois, to Mexican parents. Growing up, he practiced aikido for five years, while participating in theater at his high school. During his youth, he also attended modeling school. After graduating from high school, Rizzo enlisted in the United States Navy, where he served on USS George H.W. Bush for four years. After leaving the military, he attended culinary school, but eventually dropped out.

== Career ==
Rizzo originally had hopes of being an actor, but worried he would not be tall enough to get roles. He decided to start performing in porn after meeting former pornographic actor Shane Frost through gay social networking and online dating application Jack'd. In 2013, he appeared in his first pornographic scene with studio Randy Blue, for which he only shot one scene. Though he planned on quitting after the scene, he came into contact with fellow porn actor Bruno Bond, who encouraged him to apply for Raging Stallion. After applying, he appeared in a scene with Landon Conrad for the studio, which was followed by scenes with Falcon Studios and Breeditraw.com. His earliest scenes involving bareback sex were performed under the name Joey Rodriguez, while those performed using a condom were made under the name Armond Rizzo. In 2017, he was nominated for a GayVN Award for Best Ethnic Scene, but turned down the nomination. Also in 2017, he was the third most searched-for gay pornographic actor on Pornhub.

In 2019, Rizzo appeared in the pornographic film Big Black Daddy with Max Konnor for Noir Male, for which he won the GayVN Award for Best Duo Sex Scene (making Rizzo and Konnor the first actors of color to win the award) and earned a nomination for the Grabby Award for Best Duo. That same year, he won the Grabby Award for Hottest Bottom. In 2018, Rizzo was the second most searched-for gay porn actor on Pornhub, becoming the third-most searched in 2019. After being asked to work with studio BlacksOnBoys in January 2020, Rizzo declined, later revealing via Twitter that the studio paid performers who bottomed significantly less than performers who topped, and that the studio originally offered him between $400 and $500. The instance led to Rizzo demanding equal pay for tops and bottoms in the industry.

As of 2019, Rizzo has never been exclusive to any single agency.

== Public image ==
Adult Video News called Rizzo "the best bottom in the business" in 2019. Pedestrian TV referred to Rizzo as "one of the most renowned bottoms in the land". CromosomaX included him on their list of the 10 pornstars with the best buttocks.

== Awards ==
List of awards and nominations, with award, year, category, nominated work, result, and reference shown
Award	Year	Category	Nominee(s)	Result	Ref.
Cybersocket Web Awards	2016	Best Porn Star	Himself	Nominated	
Cybersocket Web Awards	2018	Best Porn Star	Himself	Nominated	
GayVN Awards	2019	Best Duo Sex Scene	Big Black Daddy	Won	
GayVN Awards	2019	Performer of the Year	Himself	Nominated	
GayVN Awards	2020	Best Fetish Scene	In Dyer Need	Nominated	
GayVN Awards	2020	Favorite Bottom	Himself	Nominated	
GayVN Awards	2020	Social Media Star	Himself	Won	
GayVN Awards	2021	Best Three-Way Sex Scene	When the Wife's Away	Nominated	
GayVN Awards	2022	Best Duo Sex Scene	Sous Le Chef	Nominated	
Grabby Awards
Grabby Awards	2016	Hottest Bottom	Himself	Nominated	
Grabby Awards	2017	Best Supporting Actor	Football 2	Nominated	
Grabby Awards	2019	Best Duo	Big Black Daddy	Nominated	
Grabby Awards	2019	Hottest Bottom	Himself	Won	
Grabby Awards	2020	Hottest Bottom	Himself	Nominated	
Grabby Awards	2021	Hottest Bottom	Himself	Nominated	
Pornhub Awards	2018	Most Popular Gay Performer	Himself	Nominated	
Pornhub Awards	2019	Most Popular Gay Performer	Himself	Nominated	
Pornhub Awards	2020	Most Popular Gay Performer	Himself	Nominated	
Prowler Awards	2016	Best International Porn Star	Himself	Nominated	
Prowler Awards	2017	Best International Porn Star	Himself	Nominated	
Prowler Awards	2018	Best International Porn Star	Himself	Nominated	
Prowler Awards	2020	Best International Porn Star	Himself	Nominated	
Str8UpGayPorn Awards	2017	Favorite Gay Porn Star	Himself	Nominated	
