= David McKienzie =

American volleyball player (born 1979)

Personal information
- Born: July 5, 1979 (age 47); Denver, Colorado, U.S.
- Height: 6 ft 4 in (1.93 m)

National team
United States
Medal record
Men's beach volleyball
Representing the United States
World Tour
Bronze medal – third place	2023 Mount Maunganui	Beach

David McKienzie (born July 5, 1979) is a Filipino American volleyball player. He was a 3 time All-American while playing for California State University, Long Beach (more commonly known as Long Beach State). He played for the United States national team at the 2012 Summer Olympics. David's father, William Mckienzie, was a member of the USA national team in the late 60's and an alternate for the 1968 Olympics. David's mother, Elvira Mckienzie, was a national team player for the Philippines in both volleyball and Basketball. David's sister, Joy Mckienzie, was an NCAA Division 1 champion in 1993 at Long Beach State and an All-American.

== Career ==
=== College ===
McKienzie played on the volleyball team at Long Beach State from 1998 to 2001. In 1999, he was named to the All-American second team and the NCAA All-Tournament team. His 58 kills against Brigham Young University where he set and still holds the all-time NCAA Division I record for kills in a single match. The following season, McKienzie led his team with 552 kills and was named to the AVCA All-American first team. In 2001, he had 435 kills and was second in the nation with a 5.58 kills per game average. He was an AVCA first team All-American for the second straight year.

=== National team ===
McKienzie joined the U.S. national team in 2001. In 2003, he helped the team win the NORCECA Zone Championships. He was an alternate for the 2004 Summer Olympics team.

In 2005, McKienzie led the U.S. with 3.28 kills per set. He helped the team win gold medals at the America's Cup, the NORCECA Continental Championship, and the FIVB World Grand Champions Cup. The following season, he had 306 kills to rank second on the team. The U.S. won the Pan American Cup.

McKienzie left the national team before the 2008 Summer Olympics. He then played in Puerto Rico and Kuwait. McKienzie returned to the national team in 2012 and helped the team win the silver medal at the FIVB World League. He had 21 points at the 2012 Summer Olympics.

== Professional career ==
Mckienzie played 14 years professionally for Vienna Hotvolleys, Austria (2001/2002, 2002, 2003), Orestiadas, Greece (2003/2004), Isernia Volley, Italy (2004/2005), AZS Czestochowa, Poland (2005/2006), Fenerbahce, Turkey (2006/2007), Corozal Plataneros, Puerto Rico (2007), Kuwait Club, Kuwait (2007/2008), Corozal Plataneros, Puerto Rico (2008), Dynamo Krasnodar, Russia (2008/2009), Al Jazira Club, UAE (2009/2010, 2010, 2011), Kuwait Club, Kuwait (2011/2012), Partriotas de Lares, Puerto Rico (2012), Kuwait Club, Kuwait (2013), BNI Jakarta, Indonesia (2013/2014), Kuwait Club (2014).

== Personal life ==
McKienzie was born in Denver on July 5, 1979. He graduated from Huntington Beach High School in 1997. He is 6 feet, 4 inches tall.

McKienzie's father, William McKienzie, was on the U.S. volleyball team at the Pan American Games. David's sister, Joy, also played volleyball for Long Beach State.

McKienzie, whose Muslim name is Mohd Daud, is married to Malaysian actress, Lana Nodin on May 15, 2015
