= Lanna (given name) =

Lanna is a given name. Notable people with the name include:

- Lanna Commins (born 1983), Thai singer
- Lanna Saunders (1941–2007), American actress

== See also ==
- Anna (name)
- Lana (given name)
- Lanna (surname)
