= Jordi El Niño Polla =

Spanish pornographic actor, producer and YouTuber (born 1994)

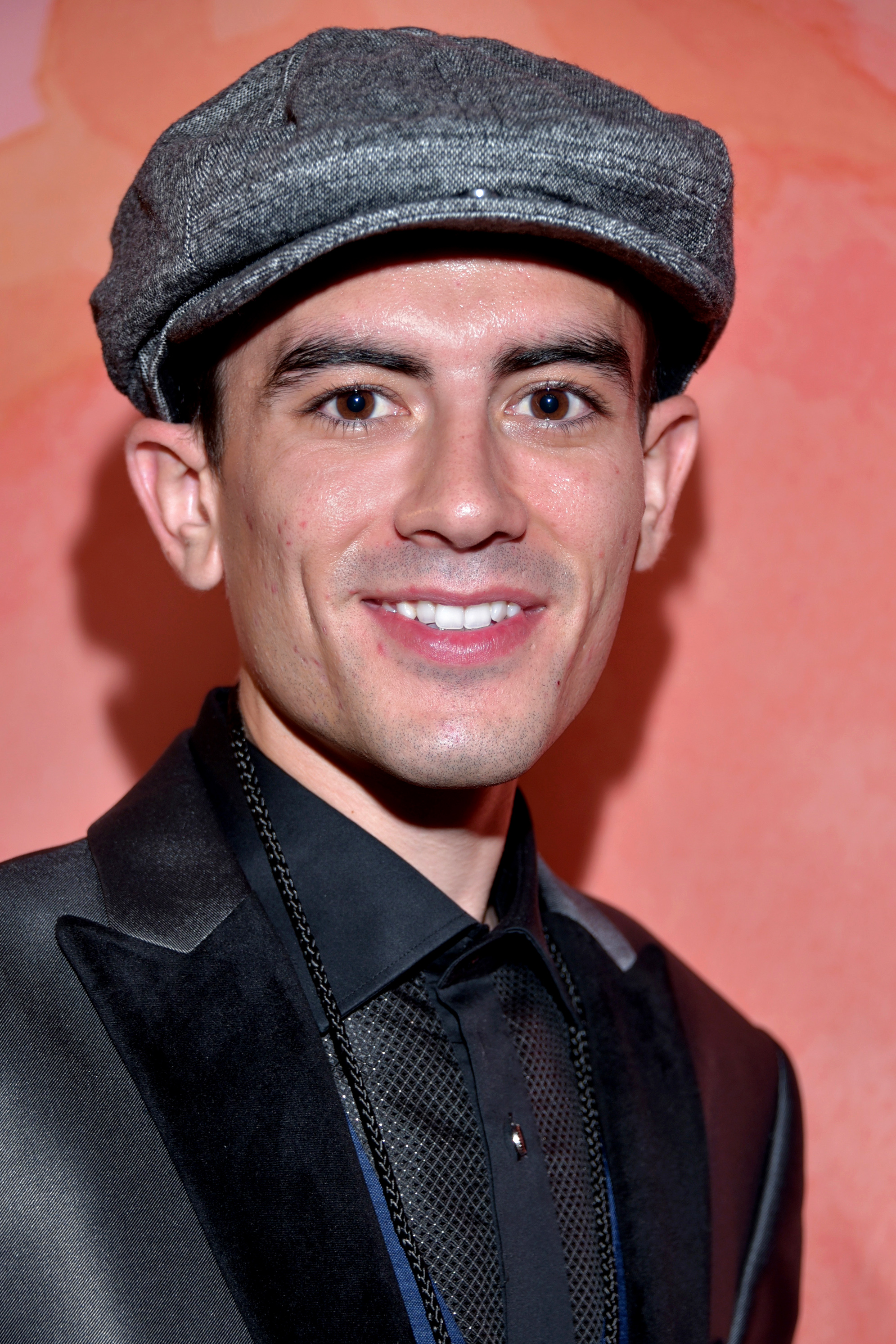
- García in October 2019
- Born: Ángel Muñoz García; 11 September 1994 (age 32); Ciudad Real, Castilla–La Mancha, Spain
- Occupations: Pornographic film actor; YouTuber
- Years active: 2013–present

YouTube information
- Channel: Jordi ENP
- Genres: Comedy; vlog
- Subscribers: 3.99 Million
- Views: 433 Million
- Last updated: 2 July 2026

2003*&#~~~~

Ángel Muñoz García (Spanish: [ˈaŋxel muˈɲoθ ɣaɾˈθia]; born 11 September 1994), better known as by his stage name Jordi El Niño Polla (Spanish: [ˈɟʝoɾði el ˈniɲo ˈpoʎa]; "Jordi 'The Dick Boy'"), often shortened to Jordi ENP, is a Spanish pornographic actor, producer, and YouTuber who rose to prominence after working with the production company Brazzers.

In 2018–2020, García received the Pornhub Award for Most Popular Male Performer three consecutive years in a row. As of October 2025, his YouTube channel has amassed over 4 million subscribers and 430 million views.

== Career ==
García first became interested in acting in adult films at the age of 18 after seeing an advertisement for models on the internet. After submitting photos of himself, he began acting and producing for the company FaKings in 2013. While working for the company, García received the nickname "El Niño Polla" (Spanish for "The Dick Boy") from one of the producers due to his small frame and youthful appearance.

In March 2016, García was contacted via Twitter about making content for the production company Brazzers. After one of his scenes became the company's most watched video of the year, he was offered an exclusive contract. In early 2017, Vice News attributed his success among several other young male porn actors who are associated as being part of the rise in MILF pornography. That same year, he received an AVN Award nomination for Best Male Newcomer.

=== YouTube Channel ===
On 27 October 2017, García created an official YouTube channel. His first upload received over 25 million views. In less than two months, García's channel received the Gold Play Button, a YouTube achievement for surpassing 1,000,000 subscribers. As of 13 May 2021, his channel has amassed over 4 million subscribers and 393 million views.

Top 10 most-viewed Jordi ENP videos on YouTube
#	Video name	Views (millions)	Upload date
1.	"MI DURA VIDA"	26.2	30 October 2017
2.	"Mi novia, los Ninfa y Mi Dura Vida 2 'P*rnStar'"	15.7	30 November 2017
3.	"Cinco días de intensos rodajes en Londres"	13.5	8 July 2018
4.	"CON LUISITO COMUNICA EN UN DÍA N0P0R"	13.2	25 February 2018
5.	"MY JUMP TO FAME - FIRST YEAR IN ZZ"	10.0	24 January 2018
6.	"Apolonia SIN C*NSURA en el especial 2M"	9.0	5 April 2018
7.	"50 COSAS SOBRE MÍ"	8.3	7 November 2017
8.	"LAS HERMANAS ORTEGA"	7.5	30 December 2018
9.	"Las 10 actrices N0P0R con las que más he disfrutado. TOP SECRET 🔥"	7.2	22 April 2018
10.	"Mis anécdotas más SURREALISTAS trabajando.	6.5	24 August 2018

== Personal life ==
García was born and raised in Ciudad Real, Castilla–La Mancha. In an interview, he revealed that he didn't smoke and rarely drank. In 2018, García revealed that he had been dating a woman outside the pornographic industry since June 2016.

== Awards and nominations ==
AVN Awards
Year	Nominated work and artist	Category	Result	Ref.
2017	Jordi El Niño Polla	Best Male Newcomer	Nominated	

Euro XMA Awards
Year	Nominated work and artist	Category	Result	Ref.
2025	Hire a Husband	Best Sex Scene — Vignette	Won	

Pornhub Awards
Year	Nominated work and artist	Category	Result	Ref.
2018	Jordi El Niño Polla	Funniest Performer (Fan Award)	Won	
2018	Jordi El Niño Polla	Most Popular Male Performer	Won	
2019	Jordi El Niño Polla	Most Popular Male Performer	Won	
2019	Jordi El Niño Polla	Most Popular Male Performer By Women	Nominated	
2020	Jordi El Niño Polla	Most Popular Male Performer	Won	
2022	Jordi El Niño Polla	Most Popular Male Performer	Nominated	
2022	Jordi El Niño Polla	Most Popular Male Performer By Women	Nominated	
2022	Jordi El Niño Polla	Top Big Dick Performer	Won	
2025	Jordi El Niño Polla	Best Dick	Won	

XBIZ Awards
Year	Nominated work and artist	Category	Result	Ref.
2020	Plow-Her Walking	Best Sex Scene - Comedy	Nominated	

XBIZ Europa Awards
Year	Nominated work and artist	Category	Result	Ref.
2020	Jordi El Niño Polla	Male Performer of the Year	Nominated	
2021	Jordi El Niño Polla	Male Performer of the Year	Nominated	
2023	Jordi El Niño Polla	Male Performer of the Year	Nominated	
2024	Jordi El Niño Polla	Best Sex Scene — Gonzo	Nominated	
2024	Jordi El Niño Polla	Male Performer of the Year	Nominated	

XRCO Awards
Year	Nominated work and artist	Category	Result	Ref.
2017	Jordi El Niño Polla	New Stud	Nominated	
