= Lanner (surname) =

Lanner is a surname of European origin.

== Notable people ==
- August Lanner (1835–1855), Austrian composer, son of Joseph Lanner
- Baruch Lanner (born 1949), American Orthodox rabbi, who was convicted of child sexual abuse
- Joseph Lanner (1801–1843), Austrian composer
- Katti Lanner (1829–1908), Viennese ballet dancer and choreographer, daughter of Joseph Lanner
- Mats Lanner (born 1961), Swedish golfer
- Olle Lanner (1884–1926), Swedish gymnast
- Sixtus Lanner (1934–2022), Austrian politician
- Susi Lanner (1911–2006), Austrian actress

== See also ==
- Lanner (disambiguation)
