= Lanner =

Lanner may refer to:

== People ==
- Lanner (surname), list of people with this name

== Places ==
- Lanner, Cornwall
- Lanner Gorge in South Africa

== Birds ==
- Lanner falcon

== Companies ==
- Lanner Inc.
- Lanner Group Ltd

== See also ==
- Lana (disambiguation)
