= Lana Nodin =

Model and actress

- Born: Mazlina binti Hassan Nodin; Kuching, Sarawak, Malaysia
- Occupations: Actress and model
- Years active: 2005–present
- Spouse: David McKienzie (m. 2015)
- Children: 2
- Parent: Hassan Nodin (father)

Mazlina binti Hassan Nodin also known as Lana Nodin is a model who became an actress in 2005. She became known as the Malaysian Pamela Anderson.

She is known for starring in the film Gol & Gincu (2005) and in Remp-It (2006).

== Filmography ==
- 2015: Biasan
- 2013: Tokak
- 2012: Lagenda Budak Setan 2: Katerina
- 2012: Pontianak vs. Orang Minyak
- 2012: Chow Kit
