= Lana Lo =

American singer

- Born: Hong Kong
- Occupations: Singer, lyrist
- Years active: 2009-present

Chinese name
- Traditional Chinese: 羅藍亞
- Simplified Chinese: 罗蓝亚
Transcriptions
Standard Mandarin
- Hanyu Pinyin: Luo Lan Ya
- Musical career
- Genres: Pop, Pop rock, Soul, Jazz

Lana Lo (Chinese: 羅藍亞; pinyin: Luo Lan Ya) was born on 18 July in Hong Kong and is an American singer. She is the third daughter of the Shaw Brothers Studio 邵氏片場 Hong Kong film director John Law 羅馬 also known as John Lo Mar who worked with Alan Tang 鄧光榮, Brigitte Lin 林青霞, Candice Yu 余安安, (李菁), Sylvia Chang 張艾嘉. She is also the cousin of George Hu 胡宇威.

== Biography ==
Lana Lo was born in Hong Kong and was raised in Los Angeles, California since the age of three. She is mix of Hongkongese and Taiwanese. She is fluent in English, Cantonese, and Mandarin. Lo found her passion in music at the age of six.

She was often invited as the special guest to political campaigns and charity functions, performing the National Anthem and popular music. At the age of 13, she was invited as a special guest to perform 'I Will Always Love You' for Senator Ted Kennedy (Edward Kennedy) at a political event. She was later referred by Jermaine Jackson to Hollywood vocal coach "Bob Corff" for vocal training. Lo was trained by Corff for two years. She also performed for U.S. Representative Patrick J. Kennedy during his visit at Hsu Lai Temple. She later received vocal training with celebrity vocal coach Jodi Sellards, whom trained artists like A-mei, David Tao, and BoA. During the years of her studies, Lo was offered contracts from several record labels but rejected the offers. Her parents wanted her to focus on her studies and obtain a bachelor's degree at the University before she could pursue her career as a singer. Meanwhile, she collaborated with Ted Lobinger, producer and the late owner of Latte Mix Studio Santa Monica, now called The Mix Studio Santa Monica. She recorded the song titled "Out of Here" produced by Ted Lobinger and received positive feedbacks. It was then later aired in Los Angeles KAZN 1300 Radio Station. They produced several originals and cover versions together.

In 2008, she signed with an artist management agency in Hong Kong and released her first HiFi quality album "Expectation 期待" in 2009 which was produced by renowned composer Chris Babida (鮑比達) mastered in Japan by Hiroyuki Hosaka. Her promotional songs "Expectation 期待'ref>"新城知訊台資訊網". Metroradio.com.hk.</ref> hit the Guangzhou Radio Station Billboard and Metro Radio Hong Kong Billboard at number three and seven. In 2010, Lana was chosen to sing for "Ocean Park 10th Anniversary Halloween Bash 2010 commercial theme song which gained much attention and became a hit commercial song. She then released a full party version of the commercial theme song titled "Are You In". The music video of "Are You In" filmed by Director Jacky Lee was considered a high budget production.

After her debut, Lana was discovered by socialite Dr. Jasper Jiao 焦家良 the founder and chairman of LongRun Group China and LongFar Hong Kong 龍發製藥(香港) to collaborate with China's most promising producer (Chinese: 张千一; pinyin: Zhang Qian Yi) whom wrote the classic song "Tibetan Plateau" 青藏高原. Lana recorded the song in Beijing and wrote lyrics in English for the song titled "A Song For Me" 歌唱自己 produced by 张千一 Chinese lyrics written by Dr. Jasper Jiao. This was 张千一 first ever English song. In November 2010, she was invited by 张千一 to be a special guest in renowned China vocalist Tan Jing (譚晶) concert in Tengchong, Yunnan province.

"A Song For Me" drew much attention in China. Following a two-year absence in the Hong Kong showbiz, it was revealed that she had been writing lyrics, recording, and producing for the collaboration project in Beijing. Further releases of her album with her current management company still remains unknown.

== Discography ==
| Year | Album |
|---|---|
| 2009 | "Expectation 期待" |

== Awards ==
| Year | Recognition |
|---|---|
| 2009 | Hong Kong Metro Radio Best New Overseas Artiste |
| 2010 | Guangzhou Radio Station Best New Artiste |
| 2010 | Guangzhou Radio Station Best Artiste Performance of the Year (Hong Kong Region) |
