= Sokkan =

Sokkan or Sokan or Sekan (Persian: سكان) may refer to:

- Sokkan, Isfahan
- Sokkan, Fereydunshahr, Isfahan Province
- Sokkan, Sistan and Baluchestan
