= Kendra Sunderland =

American pornographic film actress (born 1995)

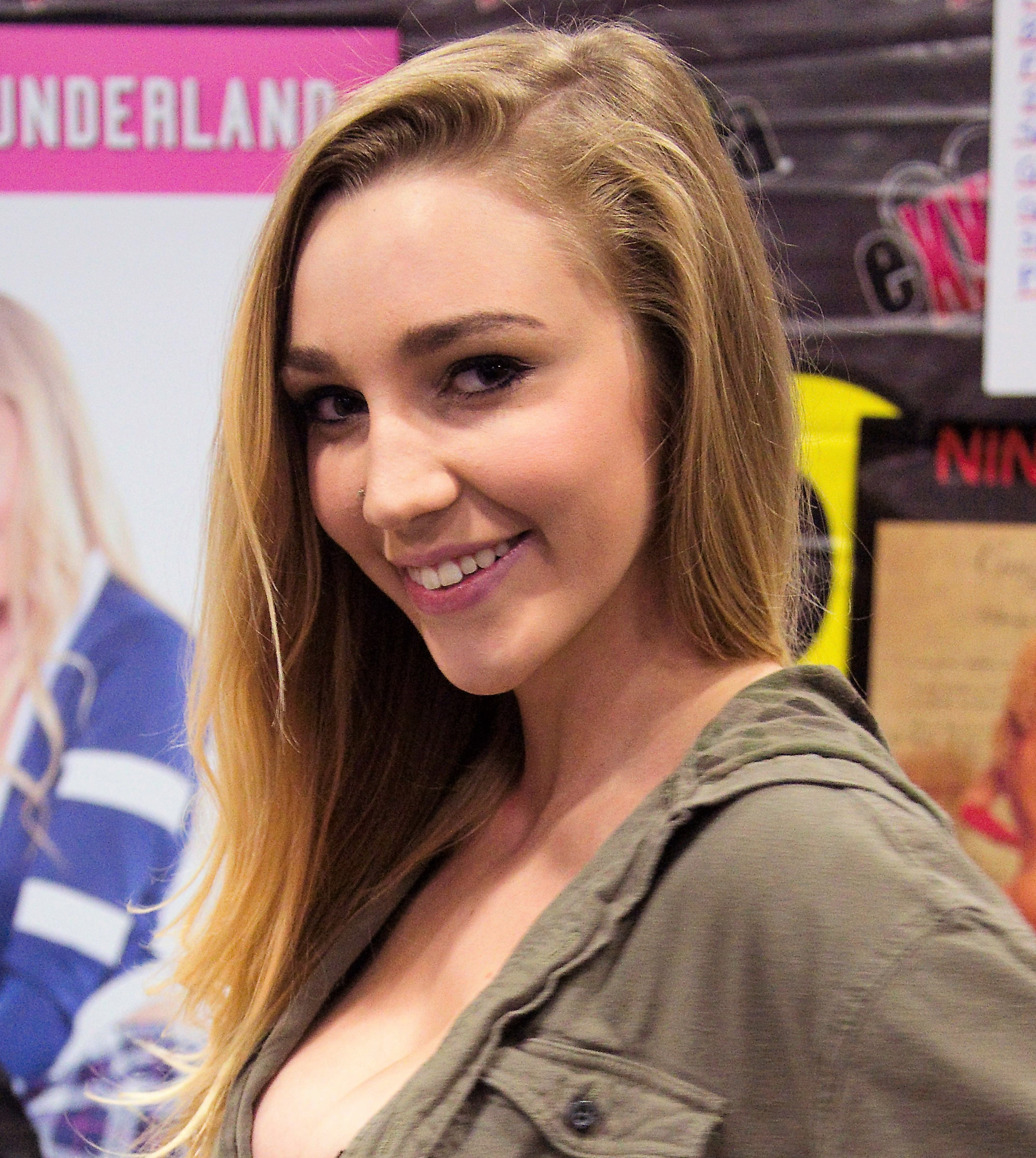
- Sunderland in 2015
- Born: Kendra Jane Sunderland; June 16, 1995 (age 31)
- Other names: Library Girl; KSLibraryGirl; Kendra Sutherland
- Education: Oregon State University (expelled)
- Occupations: Model; pornographic film actress
- Years active: 2014–present
- Height: 5 ft 9.25 in (176 cm)
- Website: kendrasunderlandvip.com

Kendra Jane Sunderland (born June 16, 1995) is an American model and pornographic film actress. She became known as Library Girl after a webcam video featuring an amateur performance in the Oregon State University student library went viral in 2015. In 2020, she signed a contract with the pornographic production company Brazzers.

== Early life ==
Sunderland planned to become a counselor or an accountant, but eventually lost interest in doing traditional office jobs. During college, she worked at a diner in Lebanon, Oregon.

== Career ==
Sunderland began posting videos to webcam site MyFreeCams in 2014, where she made hundreds of dollars per day. She was suggested by a user to perform in a public place to earn more money and used the Oregon State University library facility, where she exposed her breasts and masturbated. An unknown person recorded the video and uploaded it to Pornhub, where it subsequently went viral. Due to the circumstances, she did not expect to use her real name in her pornographic career. The University later expelled her and banned her from campus; the cam website also banned her and she faced criminal charges for public indecency and a fine of over $6,000. She pleaded guilty to the charges and paid a $1,000 fine. Her parents stopped paying her tuition once she dropped out of school.

She moved to Los Angeles, California, to have a professional career in pornography. She won a fan award for "Nicest Tits" at the inaugural Pornhub Awards in 2018, for which rapper Kanye West made sweatshirt merchandise. In 2023, her contract with Vixen Media Group ended and she began performing as a free agent for other companies.

In December 2020, Sunderland's Instagram account with 2.2 million followers was taken offline after she posted several topless photos of herself, along with a message alleging having had sexual relations with Instagram CEO Adam Mosseri.

In August 2024, she was arrested in Texas for possession of less than one ounce of cannabis, but the charges were dismissed two months later. In Sunderland's home state of Nevada, possession of small amounts of cannabis is legal.

== Awards ==
- 2015 NightMoves Award – Miss Congeniality
- 2016 XBIZ Award – Web Star of the Year
- 2016 NightMoves Award – Best Online Presence (Fan's Choice)
- 2017 AVN Award – Best Boy/Girl Sex Scene (with Mick Blue) – Natural Beauties
- 2017 Vixen Angel of the Year
- 2018 AVN Award – Best Three-Way Sex Scene (with Jason Brown and Ricky Johnson) – Kendra's Obsession
- 2018 Pornhub Award – Nicest Tits (Fan Award)
- 2024 XBIZ Award – Best Sex Scene - Gonzo (with Angela White, Blake Blossom, Angel Youngs, and Manuel Ferrara) – Take Me to Your Breeder
- 2025 XMA Award – Best Sex Scene - Vignette (with Jennifer White and Jason Luv) – Negotiation

== See also ==
- Belle Knox – American pornographic film actress
