= Lanna (surname) =

Lanna is surname. Notable people with the surname include:

- Ilario Lanna (born 1990), Italian footballer
- Marco Lanna (born 1968), Italian footballer
- Salvatore Lanna (born 1976), Italian footballer and coach

== See also ==
- Hanna (surname)
- Lanna (given name)
