= Lana (foraminifera) =

Scientific classification
- Domain: Eukaryota
- Clade: Sar
- Clade: Rhizaria
- Phylum: Retaria
- Subphylum: Foraminifera
- Class: Monothalamea
- Order: Astrorhizida
- Family: Komokiidae
- Genus: Lana; Tendal and Hessler (1977)

Type species
- Lana neglecta Tendal and Hessler (1977)

Species
- Lana neglecta; Lana reticulata; Lana spissa

Genus of foraminifera

Lana is a genus of foraminifera described in 1977 belonging to the family Komokiidae. It contains three species.
