= Lana Chapel =

American singer-songwriter

Lana Chapel is the daughter of songwriter and country and rock & roll singer Jean Chapel a.k.a. Mattie O'Neil, and her husband, western swing artist and songwriter/musician/comedian, Salty Holmes, of the Prairie Ramblers.

Some of Chapel's song credits are: "Sweet Marilyn" by Eddy Arnold, "On Second Thought" by Tompall Glaser, "The Hemphill Kentucky Consolidated Coal Mines" & "Plastic People" by Henson Cargill Peters, "Kentucky Ridgerunner" by Lester Flatt, and "It's For My Dad" by Nancy Sinatra.

She was a staff writer for several major music publishing companies in Nashville including: Owen Bradley of Decca Records, Tree Music, Frank and Nancy Music, Frank Sinatra, Tammy Wynette's company, First Lady Music and Resaca Music, Kris Kristofferson, President.

Lana was the youngest published songwriter in Nashville at age 11, and the youngest songwriter to be signed with Broadcast Music Incorporated (BMI), in 1967.

Lana has had records released on these record labels: Monument Records, Dot Records, Mega Records, and MetroCountry Records. She sings, writes, plays guitar, Native American flute, bass guitar, harmonica, keyboards, mandolin, banjo, percussion and hand drum] on her recordings. She has also produced herself as an Indie artist, and produced an Indie CD on Donna Chapel, her cousin.
