= Dillion Harper =

American pornographic film actress

- Harper in 2015
- Born: Florida, U.S.
- Occupation: Pornographic film actress
- Years active: 2012–2022

Dillion Harper is an American former pornographic film actress.

== Career ==
=== Adult films ===
Before her career, Harper worked as a country club hostess in Florida. Citing a need for money, Harper entered the adult film industry in 2012 by sending her pictures to companies such as Bang Bros and Brazzers. In 2015, she followed in the footsteps of Sasha Grey and Michelle Sinclair by posing for a shoot as a supermodel. She attended the 2016 TEXXXAS adult expo, which had been threatened due to their original host dropping the event due to opposition advocacy.

In 2018, Harper joined with Fleshlight to release an interactive sex toy.

She retired in 2022.

=== Other work ===
Outside of adult films, Harper has also provided guidance for shaving female pubic hair.

In 2019, Harper released a music single, "Porn Star", with Haitian-American hip-hop DJ, DJ Whoo Kid.

== Awards ==
- 2014 NightMoves Award – Miss Congeniality (tied with Aiden Ashley)
- 2017 NightMoves Award – Best Unsung Female Performer (Fan's Choice)
- 2018 Pornhub Award – Nicest Pussy
- 2019 Pornhub Award – Nicest Tits
