= Danika Mori =

Italian pornographic film actress (born 1990)

- Born: 1990 (age 35–36); Syracuse, Sicily, Italy
- Occupation: Pornographic film actress
- Years active: 2016–present

Danika Mori (born 1990) is an Italian pornographic film actress and model.

== Life and career ==
Born in Syracuse, Sicily, Mori went to university to study economics and online marketing in Catania. Her career in the adult entertainment industry began in 2012 under the username RedLight17 on a live webcam site.

She began performing on Pornhub in 2016, alongside her partner, Stefano. Throughout her time on the website, she has been nominated for and won multiple Pornhub Awards. During the COVID-19 pandemic, she joined the video series 'Cleanest Porn Ever', where she joined other adult film actresses to promote social distancing and proper hygiene. The couple have also emphasized the necessity for sex education not to be through pornography, with Mori supporting the rights of sex workers. She rejected the title 'porn star', stating that her videos were a mix of work and romance.
