= Lana Ladd Stokan =

American politician

Lana Ladd Stokan (born September 5, 1958) is a former American Democratic politician who served in the Missouri House of Representatives.

Born in El Dorado, Arkansas, she attended McCluer North High School, St. Louis Community College, and Southern Illinois University.
