= Johnny Sins =

American adult film performer (born 1978)

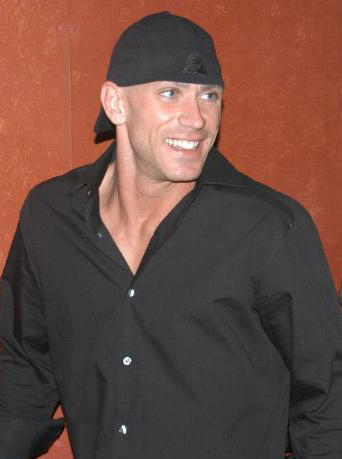
- Sins in 2007
- Born: Steven Wolfe; December 31, 1978 (age 47); Pittsburgh, Pennsylvania, U.S.
- Education: Indiana University of Pennsylvania
- Occupations: Adult entertainer; director; YouTuber; media personality
- Years active: 2006–present
- Spouse: Kissa Sins

YouTube information
- Channel: SinsTV
- Subscribers: 2.13 million
- Views: 116.9 million
- Last updated: May 12, 2026
- Website: sinslife.com

Steven Wolfe (born December 31, 1978), known professionally as Johnny Sins, is an American adult film performer, director, and YouTuber. He is consistently among the most popular male talent in adult movie searches and is known for his shaved head, muscular physique and blue eyes, often considered a sex symbol. His accolades include multiple AVN Awards wins and nominees. He has been the subject of memes, which center on the large variety of occupations his pornographic characters have worked.

== Early life ==
Sins was born Steven Wolfe in Pittsburgh on December 31, 1978. He is of German descent. His father used to work in a steel mill. He has described himself as "very shy" while growing up. After graduating from the Indiana University of Pennsylvania, he began working in construction. When he was around 24 years old, he noticed that he had started balding, and has kept his head shaved ever since. In 2006, at the age of 28, he quit his job and moved to Los Angeles to pursue a career in the pornographic film industry full time.

== Career ==
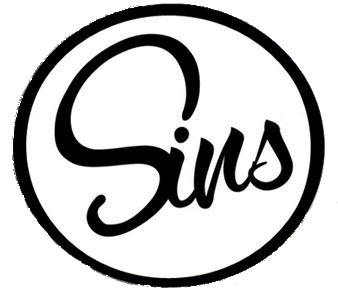
Logo of Sins's company

Sins' first pornographic endeavors were through Craigslist ads. Brazzers has described him as a "go-to guy" for the studio, as he has performed in more than 1,000 of their scenes as of April 2019.

On June 10, 2015, Pornhub launched a crowdfunding campaign through Indiegogo to produce the first adult film in space. Sins and fellow actress Eva Lovia were slated to perform in the film. If the project were successfully funded, the two would have received six months of rigorous preparation for the launch, including zero gravity, velocity, and temperature training. Sins said, "It's beyond just doing it for the money, or the money shot for that matter. It's about making history." The campaign raised $236,086 over 60 days, failing to reach its goal of $3.4 million.

In early 2017, Sins and fellow porn star Kissa Sins launched their YouTube channel SinsTV, which chronicled their day-to-day lives and featured sex advice. Following their brief separation in 2019, Sins became the sole operator of the channel, which later focused on his reaction videos and vlogs; as of January 2024, the channel has gained over 2.1 million subscribers and more than 109 million views. A video of Sins trying out various Turkish snacks briefly became the top YouTube video in Turkey.

In 2018, Sins received the award for Most Popular Male Performer by Women at the annual Pornhub Awards, for which winners were determined by users' streaming data.

He has been appearing in the mainstream scene occasionally since 2020. He shifted his main attraction focus to OnlyFans. As of March 2025, he has performed as a pornographic actor in almost 3,062 videos.

He appeared in an Indian television advertisement for men's sexual health, parodying a popular Hindi television serial, with Ranveer Singh. Sins said he was not used to filming on a crowded set.

== Image ==
Sins has been the subject of Internet memes around the world about the number of jobs he has portrayed in porn, the most well-known being a doctor and a plumber.

An example was when a former Pakistani foreign office spokesperson in 2019 mistook Sins for a Kashmiri pellet victim. Sins later responded by tweeting:

JohnnySins
(@JohnnySins)
tweeted:

Shout out to @abasitpak1 for all the new twitter followers! Thanks but my vision is fine😂😂

September 3, 2019

The subsequent tweet sparked a series of online memes.

== Personal life ==
Sins resides in Las Vegas, and is married to fellow porn star Kissa Sins. They separated in 2019 for a brief period but reconciled in 2020. Both Kissa and Johnny found each other while working together in a film and have since developed a strong relationship with each other.

In October 2017, a picture of Sins was tweeted by a user who falsely claimed that Sins was missing in the aftermath of the Las Vegas mass shooting. The tweet was one of many viral hoaxes that emerged related to the shooting.

In July 2018, as part of a marketing campaign aimed to boost college tour rides, a mural of Sins and several other porn stars was painted on the side of a bus driving around the Indian state of Kerala.

== Awards and nominations ==
Award	Year	Work	Category	Result	Ref.
AVN Award	2008	Fuck Club	Best Couples Sex Scene – Video	Nominated	
AVN Award	2009	Cheerleaders	Best Group Sex Scene	Nominated	
AVN Award	2009	Himself	Best Male Newcomer	Nominated	
AVN Award	2009	Cheerleaders	Best Three-Way Sex Scene	Nominated	
AVN Award	2010	Cum-Spoiled Sluts	Best Three-Way Sex Scene	Nominated	
AVN Award	2011	Big Butts Like It Big 6	Best Anal Sex Scene	Nominated	
AVN Award	2011	Performers of the Year 2010	Best Couples Sex Scene	Nominated	
AVN Award	2011	Himself	Unsung Male Performer of the Year	Nominated	
AVN Award	2012	Introducing the Russo Twins	Most Outrageous Sex Scene	Nominated	
AVN Award	2012	Himself	Unsung Male Performer of the Year	Nominated	
AVN Award	2013	Brazzers Presents: The Parodies 2	Best Three-Way Sex Scene	Nominated	
AVN Award	2013	Himself	Unsung Male Performer of the Year	Won	
AVN Award	2014	Bridesmaids	Best Group Sex Scene	Nominated	
AVN Award	2015	Himself	Favorite Male Porn Star	Nominated	
AVN Award	2015	Himself	Male Performer of the Year	Nominated	
AVN Award	2016	Sins Life Part 2	Best Boy/Girl Sex Scene	Nominated	
AVN Award	2017	Himself	Favorite Male Porn Star	Won	
AVN Award	2018	Young and Beautiful 3	Best Boy/Girl Sex Scene	Nominated	
AVN Award	2018	Sins Life: Sex Tour	Best Three-Way Sex Scene	Nominated	
AVN Award	2018	Himself	Male Performer of the Year	Nominated	
AVN Award	2018	Himself	Favorite Male Porn Star	Won	
Pornhub Award	2018	Himself	Most Popular Male Performer by Women	Won	
Pornhub Award	2022	Himself	Best Dick (Fan Voting)	Won	
XBIZ Award	2010	Himself	Male Performer of the Year	Nominated	
XBIZ Award	2014	Bridesmaids	Best Scene – Feature Movie	Nominated	
XBIZ Award	2014	Big Tits at Work 17	Best Scene – Vignette Release	Nominated	
XBIZ Award	2014	My Dad's Hot Girlfriend 17	Best Scene – Vignette Release	Nominated	
XBIZ Award	2014	Himself	Male Performer of the Year	Nominated	
XBIZ Award	2015	Doctor's Orders	Best Scene – Vignette Release	Nominated	
XBIZ Award	2016	Let's Play Doctor	Best Scene – Vignette Release	Won	
XBIZ Award	2016	Himself	Male Performer of the Year	Nominated	
XBIZ Award	2017	I Have a Wife 36	Best Scene – Vignette Release	Nominated	
XBIZ Award	2017	Himself	Male Performer of the Year	Nominated	
XBIZ Award	2018	Natural Beauties 2	Best Sex Scene – Vignette Release	Nominated	
XRCO Award	2009	Himself	New Stud	Nominated	
XRCO Award	2014	Himself	Male Performer of the Year	Nominated	
XRCO Award	2015	Himself	Unsung Swordsman of the Year	Nominated	
XRCO Award	2017	Himself	Unsung Swordsman of the Year	Nominated	
