= Owen Gray (actor) =

American pornographic actor

- Occupation: Pornographic film actor
- Years active: 2012–present

Owen Gray is an American pornographic film actor and director who, along with appearing in a multitude of films and achieving multiple award nominations, has also received credit for his style of performance.

== Early and personal life ==
Before entering the adult film industry, Gray attended cosmetology school to become licensed as a hair colorist as well as going to college for fashion design and working in the fashion industry for four years.

Gray's website describes himself as 'sexually fluid'. In 2021, he stated that he had been married to his wife for 11 years.

== Career ==
Gray began his career in adult films in 2012 in appearances with BDSM film company Kink.com. In recent years, he has moved his content towards personal posts, particularly on Pornhub, OnlyFans, and DeepLush, the latter of which Gray founded. He has also performed in scenes with trans actors.

Gray has been nominated for a variety of awards throughout his career, including for AltPorn, Fleshbot, Pornhub, and XRCO Awards.

His style of performance is often the recipient of praise from many viewers, who have contrasted him with the negative traits exhibited by many male performers, which Gray stated he has sought to avoid. He has also been frequently the subject of TikTok edits, particularly from women, who praise his distinctive style and appearance, which include a series of tattoos and a y-shaped scar which was from body modification, though Gray states that he is not active on social media.
