= Lana Rhoades =

American internet personality and former adult film star

- Rhoades in 2017
- Occupations: Internet personality; podcaster
- Children: 1

YouTube information
- Channel: Lana Rhoades
- Genres: Vlog; Podcast
- Subscribers: 1 million
- Views: 21.9 million
- Last updated: November 2026

Lana Rhoades is an American internet personality, podcaster and former pornographic film actress. She has appeared in publications such as Hustler, Penthouse and Playboy.

== Early life ==
Rhoades was raised by a single mother in a suburb of Chicago, with an older sister who suffered from schizophrenia. According to Rhoades, most of the household's attention was devoted to caring for her sister, leaving Rhoades neglected. Rhoades was raised Southern Baptist, and her grandfather was a preacher. Although she no longer affirms the more "strict" aspects of her religion, Rhoades continues to practice her Christian faith.

As a teenager, Rhoades admired the glamorous lifestyle of Playboy models who were featured on the television series The Girls Next Door. By age 14, she wanted to be a porn star. She began using narcotics with her first boyfriend, and acted as an accomplice in several burglaries. When she was 16, she was sentenced to youth detention at the Warrenville Youth Center. She obtained her GED certificate during her incarceration, and was released after one year for good behavior. Rhoades said that incarceration was one of the best things to happen to her, because it diverted her from a path of drugs and crime.

== Career ==
After her release from Warrenville, Rhoades began her foray into legal sex work by hostessing at a Tilted Kilt restaurant and performing at a strip club. She appeared in her first pornographic film in 2016 at the age of 19. In an interview with Playboy, Rhoades said that her first talent agent was aggressive and controlling. Rhoades developed medical issues from constantly being penetrated on set, but her agent would not give her time off to see a doctor. After taking a hiatus from work for several months, she began shooting films with a different agent. She said this agent constantly prodded her to do more intense types of porn. Rhoades left the industry in late 2017. Two years later, she was the most-searched actress on the website Pornhub, with 345 million views. After leaving the porn industry, she transitioned into a career as a social media influencer. In February 2020, she was hired as a marketing consultant by the adult-film production company Brazzers.

Rhoades has been open about exploitation and abuse in the porn industry, and has discouraged other women from entering the industry. She has stated that she earns hundreds of thousands of dollars per month by posting nude photos and videos on OnlyFans, a platform which allows her to control how her body is portrayed. Rhoades co-hosts the podcast 3 Girls 1 Kitchen. She has designed a lingerie line with the Playboy-owned company Yandy.

In 2021, Rhoades began to promote the cryptocurrency PAWGcoin. In November of that year, she developed an NFT image project, which was launched in 2022. According to the cryptocurrency journalist Coffeezilla, Rhoades abandoned the project after its $1.8 million launch and transferred out $1.5 million worth of assets.

In 2026, Rhoades sold her likeness to a pornographic artificial intelligence website to avoid having to shoot any additional scenes herself.

== Personal life ==
Rhoades gave birth to a son in 2022. According to a 2021 Playboy profile, she owns one house in Los Angeles and another in Chicago.

== Awards ==
- 2017 AVN Award – Hottest Newcomer
- 2017 XBIZ Award – Best New Starlet
- 2017 NightMoves Award – Best New Starlet (Fan's Choice)
- 2017 NightMoves Award – Best Star Showcase (Fan's Choice) – Lana
- 2017 November Vixen Angel
- 2018 AVN Award – Best Anal Sex Scene – Anal Savages 3 (with Markus Dupree)
- 2018 NightMoves Award – Best Body (Fan's Choice)
- 2019 Pornhub Award – Most Popular Female Performer
- 2019 NightMoves Award – Best Star Showcase (Fan's Choice) – Ultimate Fuck Toy: Lana Rhoades
- 2020 Pornhub Award – Most Popular Female Performer
