= American MILF =

- American MILF DVD cover
- Directed by: Kayden Kross
- Written by: Kayden Kross
- Starring: Christy Canyon; Serenity Cox; Brandi Love; Phoenix Marie; Maitland Ward
- Edited by: Duboko
- Production company: Vixen Media Group
- Release date: July 31, 2024
- Running time: 233 minutes
- Country: United States
- Language: English

American MILF is a 2024 American pornographic film produced by MILFY, a subsidiary of Vixen Media Group. Featuring Serenity Cox, Christy Canyon, Phoenix Marie, Brandi Love, Maitland Ward, and multiple men, the movie won multiple industry awards.

== History ==
American MILF was shot over eight days and was written and directed by Kayden Kross, who intended the series as a homage to mainstream comedies such as Modern Family and The Office. It was the first full-length feature for Vixen Media Group subsidiary MILFY, who by July 2024 had won the AVN Award for Best New Production Brand. The movie followed the lives of multiple North American women with high sex drives. Its cast included Maitland Ward playing a professor whose son was leaving home for college, Brandi Love playing a weather reporter in the middle of a divorce, Christy Canyon playing a stay-at-home mother, Phoenix Marie playing a fitness enthusiast interested in Ward's son, Serenity Cox playing a housewife, and Isiah Maxwell, Parker Ambrose, Hollywood Cash, Derek Savage, Dan Damage, Jason Luv, and Jay Hefner playing various roles.

The movie marked Canyon's return to feature-length porn, as she had retired in 1997 after finding a partner, while Ward had entered the industry after a successful mainstream film career. Cox had been recruited having filmed for Vixen twice in 2023 (once with Damage and once under MILFY with Luv and Alberto Blanco), while Kross contacted Canyon after finding out about her return to porn via her husband and Ward, Love, Damage, and Luv were under an exclusive contract to Vixen. Hefner was fatally shot shortly after his scenes aired.

Its first episode, featuring Cox and Maxwell, premiered on July 31, 2024, on MILFY and Vixen Plus; the second was one of eight scenes Vixen added to Vixen Plus that day. The final episode, featuring all five actresses and Jason Luv, featured Canyon's first reverse gangbang and aired alongside "The Making of American MILF", which contained an interview with Kross and unseen footage. The series was released on DVD on November 27, 2024. The movie won the Mark Stone Award for Outstanding Comedy at the 2025 AVN Awards, while the finale received a 2025 AVN Award nomination for Best Foursome/Orgy Scene and Ward won the XBIZ Award for Best Lead Acting.

== Chapters ==
- Chapter 1: Serenity Cox, Isiah Maxwell
- Chapter 2: Christy Canyon, Phoenix Marie, Parker Ambrose
- Chapter 3: Brandi Love, Hollywood Cash, Derek Savage
- Chapter 4: Maitland Ward, Dan Damage
- Chapter 5: Christy Canyon, Phoenix Marie, Brandi Love, Maitland Ward, Serenity Cox, Jason Luv
- Bonus Chapter: Reagan Foxx, Jay Romero

== Awards ==
- 2025: XMA Award – Best Comedy Movie
- 2025: XMA Award – Best Acting – Lead: Maitland Ward
- 2025: XMA Award – Best Sex Scene – Comedy Movie: Christy Canyon, Serenity Cox, Brandi Love, Maitland Ward, Phoenix Marie, Jason Luv
- 2025: XMA Award – Best Editing: Duboko
- 2025: AVN Award – Best MILF Movie or Collected Release
- 2025: AVN Award – Mark Stone Award for Outstanding Comedy
- 2025: Adult Empire Award – Movie of the Year
