= Vixen Media Group =

American adult film production company

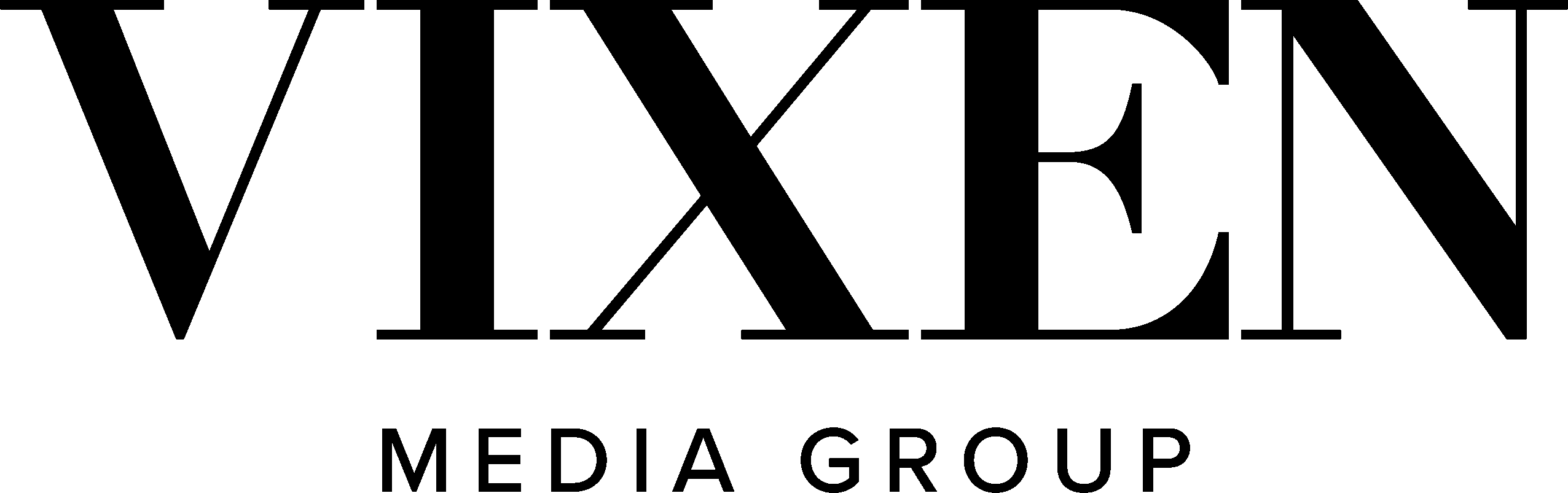
- Industry: Pornography
- Founded: 2014; 12 years ago
- Founders: Steve Matthyssen; Mike Miller; Greg Lansky
- Headquarters: Los Angeles, California, U.S.
- Area served: Worldwide
- Products: Pornographic films
- Parent: Strike 3 Holdings
- Website: vixengroup.com

Vixen Media Group, commonly referred to as Vixen, is an independent Internet pornography production company located in Los Angeles, California.

== Company ==
Vixen Media Group was founded in 2014 by French entrepreneur and director Greg Lansky, who is also the CEO of GL Web Media and Strike 3 Holding, along with partners Steve Matthyssen and Mike Miller. Lansky sold his stake in Vixen Studios in January 2020.

Vixen Media Group owns and operates nine online adult film sites: Vixen, Tushy, Blacked, Blacked Raw, Tushy Raw, Deeper, Slayed, Wifey and Milfy. Slayed, launched in August 2021, is the company's first all-girl brand. Pulse Distribution distributes all of the company's films.

=== Websites ===
Website/Brand	Date of creation	Specialization
Blacked	May 2014	Interracial pornography, mostly featuring black men and white women
Tushy	June 2015	Anal pornography
Vixen	July 2016	Glamour pornography
Blacked Raw	October 2017	Gonzo-style interracial pornography
Tushy Raw	December 2018	Gonzo-style anal pornography
Deeper	April 2019	Various types of pornography from softcore to BDSM, directed by Kayden Kross
Slayed	August 2021	Lesbian pornography
Milfy	June 2023	MILF pornography
Wifey	March 2025	Hotwives

== Legal action ==
The holding company of Vixen Media Group, Strike 3 Holdings, has, as of 2025, filed over 20,000 lawsuits since 2017 against people it alleges have infringed its copyright by illegally downloading Vixen Media Group pornographic films via BitTorrent. Strike 3 Holdings pressures the accused to settle, often with the implication that otherwise their use of pornography will be exposed. Few cases reach trial, with most being settled for four- or five-figure sums or dismissed. Strike 3 has been described as engaging in copyright trolling. DC judge Royce Lamberth has described Strike 3 as a "copyright troll" that utilizes "cut-and-pasted complaints and boilerplate discovery motions" to "flood" courts with cases "smacking of extortion", describing its treatment of courts "not as a citadel of justice, but as an ATM".

== Filmography ==
Year	Title	Brands involved	Notes
2021	Psychosexual	Blacked, Blacked Raw, Deeper, Tushy, Vixen	starring Gianna Dior
2021	Jia	Blacked, Tushy, Vixen	starring Jia Lissa
2021	Influence: Emily Willis	Blacked, Deeper, Slayed, Vixen	starring Emily Willis
2023	Hotel Vixen (Season 1)	Blacked, Tushy, Vixen	series
2023	In Vogue	Blacked, Tushy, Vixen	starring Kelly Collins
2023	Influence: Vanna Bardot	Blacked, Tushy, Slayed	starring Vanna Bardot
2024	Hotel Vixen (Season 2)	Blacked, Tushy, Vixen	series
2024	American MILF	MILFY	starring Christy Canyon, Serenity Cox, Brandi Love, Phoenix Marie, Maitland Ward
2025	The Blueprint	Blacked	starring Jason Luv, Isiah Maxwell, Alina Lopez, Serenity Cox, Angie Faith

== Awards ==
Vixen has won several major awards in the adult-film industry, including:

- 2018 AVN Award – Best Ingénue Movie
- 2018 AVN Award – Best Marketing Campaign
- 2018 AVN Award – Best New Series
- 2018 AVN Award – Best Three-Way Sex Scene – Girl/Girl/Boy
- 2017 AVN Award – Best Boy/Girl Sex Scene
- 2017 AVN Award – Best New Studio
- 2017 AVN Award – Best Anthology Movie
- 2017 AVN Award – Best Director – Non-Feature
- 2017 AVN Award – Best Marketing Campaign – Company Image
- 2017 AVN Award – Best New Imprint
- 2022 XBIZ Award — Studio of the Year
- 2022 XBIZ Europa Award – Global Studio Brand of the Year
