= Serenity Cox =

Canadian pornographic film actress

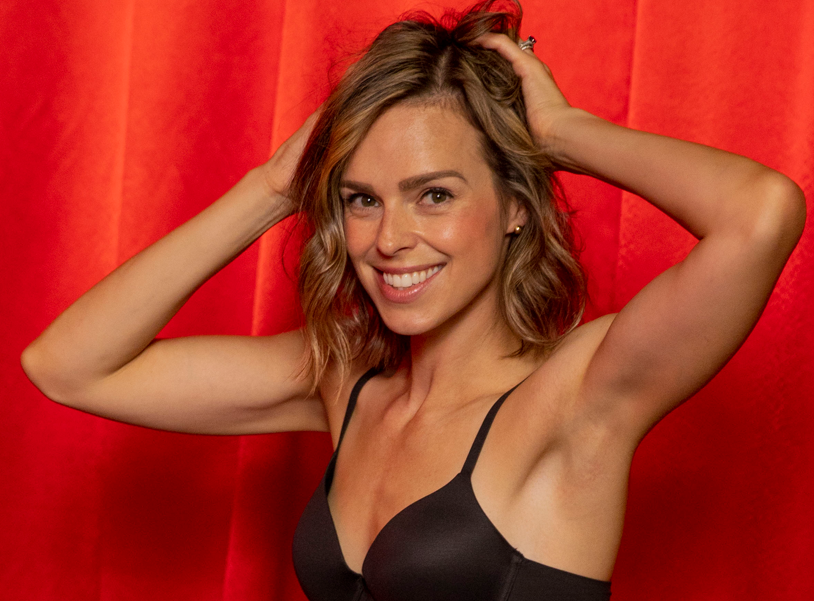
- Cox in 2022
- Born: Ontario, Canada
- Occupations: Pornographic film actress; content creator
- Years active: 2020–present
- Website: serenitycox.ca

Serenity Cox is a Canadian pornographic film actress and content creator who began working in the adult entertainment industry after first becoming involved in hotwifing. She subsequently moved into professional adult film production and developed a career appearing in productions for several major studios and websites.

In September 2023, Cox signed with Vixen Media Group, expanding her profile within the industry. She later appeared as a cast member in American MILF, a reality-style adult series centred on established female performers. In addition to her work with Vixen Media Group, she has filmed for companies including Brazzers and has appeared across a range of adult film productions and online content.

Cox has also received recognition from the adult entertainment industry, earning nominations and winning several industry awards for her performances and online work. Alongside studio productions, she has maintained a presence as an independent content creator, using subscription-based and social-media platforms to distribute material directly to her audience.

== Career ==
Cox worked as an emergency department nurse for fifteen years until February 2024, having moved to a large hospital in the mid-2010s. She spent much of her nursing career as a charge nurse. During the COVID-19 pandemic in Canada, Cox and her husband began acting out their hotwifing fantasies and began filming themselves participating in threesomes from her husband's point of view, uploading their videos to FetLife. In 2021, under the impression that profiles with a certain number of subscribers received free merchandise, they began uploading videos to Pornhub, initially under the name Hot Wife Adventures. In 2022, she won Best Newcomer at that firm's award ceremony.

Cox signed to Vixen Media Group in September 2023 and filmed her first scene for Vixen in November with Dan Damage. That month, she won the 2023 xHamster Award for Lesbian Creator of the Year. In 2024, she began filming for the firm's Milfy division, including the two-parter Enjoy It, by June, she had filmed Dinner Guest Dines on Wife's Pussy for Brazzers with Kyle Mason. Cox signed an exclusive contract with Vixen in May 2024 and subsequently joined the cast of Vixen's American MILF alongside Brandi Love, Maitland Ward, Christy Canyon, and Phoenix Marie, which was released in July. Her first two scenes for the platform featured Jason Luv and Isiah Maxwell, with the latter receiving a 2025 AVN Award nomination for Best Foursome/Orgy Scene.

In August 2024, Cox appeared in the indie horror movie The Highest Brasil. By December, she was living in Toronto and was volunteering at a women's sexual health clinic. She won the 2025 XBIZ's XMA Award for Favorite MILF Performer. The following March, she and her husband were part of the starting lineup of WIFEY, a channel from Vixen Media Group that focused on the hotwife lifestyle, for which she performed with Damage, Hollywood Cash, and her husband, Mr Cox.

By September 2025, Serenity had filmed for VMG brands Blacked Raw and Deeper. That month, she appeared in The Blueprint: Part 4, a reimagining of the founding of Blacked. Cox's episode featured her first gang bang. In October, WIFEY announced Serenity Cox would be become the face of their platform as their official Brand Ambassador.

== Awards ==
Year	Ceremony	Award	Work
2022	Pornhub Awards	Favorite Newcomer	—N/a
2023	Pornhub Awards	Top Fetish Performer	—N/a
2023	Pornhub Awards	Amateur Pornhub Model of the Year	—N/a
2023	xHamster Awards	Lesbian Creator of the Year	—N/a
2024	Faphouse Awards	Lesbian Creator of the Year	—N/a
2024	xHamster Awards	Female Creator of the Year	—N/a
2025	XBIZ Awards	Favorite MILF Performer	—N/a
2025	XBIZ Awards	Best Sex Scene, Comedy	American MILF
2025	XBIZ Awards	Best Comedy Movie	American MILF
2025	AVN Awards	Best MILF Movie or Collected Release	American MILF
2025	AVN Awards	Mark Stone Award for Outstanding Comedy	American MILF
2025	Pornhub Awards	Favorite Fetish Model	—N/a
2026	XBIZ Awards	Best Drama Movie	The Blueprint
2026	XBIZ Awards	MILF Creator of the Year	—N/a
2026	XMA Creator Awards	MILF Premium Social Media Star of the Year	—N/a
2026	Pornhub Awards	Favorite Fetish Model	—N/a
