= CEG TEK International =

- Type: Private
- Industry: Digital media, Copy protection, online infringement tracking
- Founded: 2009
- Defunct: 2016
- Headquarters: Beverly Hills, California, United States
- Services: Copyright infringement detection and remediation
- Website: www.cegtek.com

CEG TEK International (formerly Copyright Enforcement Group) was a Los Angeles–based copyright monetization firm. The company also conducted and released studies about unauthorized distribution of motion pictures, music, and other forms of digital media.

CEG TEK International primarily represented motion picture studios, including Nu Image and Millennium Films, and protected their digital content online. The company monitored P2P file sharing. Electronic notices were sent to Internet service providers and their customers, which offered a release of liability in exchange for a settlement amount. CEG TEK International claimed users who paid for their infringement were less likely to share illegal content in future.

== Controversy ==
It had been claimed that CEG TEK's activities could be classified as copyright trolling.
