= Wifey =

Wifey may refer to:

- "Wifey" (song), a 2000 song by Next
- "Wifey", a 2022 song by Rubi Rose
- "Wifey", a 2007 song by Tinie Tempah
- Wifey, a 1978 novel by Judy Blume
- "WIFEY", Pornographic film studio
