= Otis D. Wright II =

American judge (born 1944)

Otis Dalino Wright II
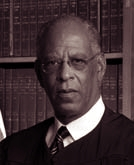

Judge of the United States District Court for the Central District of California
- Incumbent
- Assumed office April 16, 2007
- Appointed by: George W. Bush
- Preceded by: Gary L. Taylor

Judge of the Los Angeles County Superior Court
- In office December 5, 2005 – April 16, 2007
- Appointed by: Arnold Schwarzenegger

Deputy Attorney General of California
- In office 1980–1983

Personal details
- Born: Otis Dalino Wright II; July 31, 1944 (age 82) Tuskegee, Alabama, U.S.
- Party: Independent
- Spouse: Evelyn F. Rhaney
- Education: California State University at Los Angeles (BA); Southwestern Law School (JD)

Military service
- Allegiance: United States
- Branch/service: United States Marine Corps
- Years of service: 1963–1966 (active duty); 1966–1969 (reserve)
- Rank: Sergeant

Otis Dalino Wright II (born July 31, 1944) is a United States district judge of the United States District Court for the Central District of California.

== Early life and education ==
Born in Tuskegee, Alabama, Wright received a Bachelor of Arts degree from California State University at Los Angeles in 1976 and a Juris Doctor from Southwestern Law School in 1980. He was in the United States Marine Corps from 1963 to 1966, remaining in the United States Marine Corps Reserve until 1969. He was a deputy sheriff in the Los Angeles County Sheriff's Department from 1969 to 1980. He was a deputy attorney general in the Office of the Attorney General, California Department of Justice from 1980 to 1983. He was in private practice in Los Angeles from 1983 to 2005.

== Judicial service ==
On October 28, 2005, California Governor Arnold Schwarzenegger announced that he would be appointing Wright to serve as a judge on the Los Angeles County Superior Court. Wright replaced Judge Lorna Parnell.

Wright was nominated to the United States District Court for the Central District of California by President George W. Bush on September 5, 2006, to a seat vacated by Gary L. Taylor. He was confirmed by the United States Senate on March 15, 2007, and received his commission on April 16, 2007.

== Notable cases ==
Case	Year	Reason for becoming widely discussed or noted
Spokeo, Inc. v. Robins	2011	Ruled against plaintiff's standing to sue because he had not alleged a sufficiently individualized injury. Wright was reversed by the unanimous United States Court of Appeals for the Ninth Circuit, which was itself then found to be in error by the U.S. Supreme Court. On remand, the Ninth Circuit again found the plaintiff had standing to sue.
Prenda Law	2013	Ruling against a "notorious" U.S. law firm and principals, which was viewed by onlookers and the court as engaging in copyright trolling and alleged legal extortion practices, often via shell companies. The case resulted in sanctions and law firm dissolution. Wright's opinion included a number of Star Trek catchphrases.
U.S.A. v. Hudson, Whitfield & Dunlap	2014	Ruling against legitimacy of a Bureau of Alcohol, Tobacco, Firearms and Explosives ("ATF") fictional stash-house robbery sting operation; such operations had drawn significant media and judicial concerns previously for a perceived inherent lack of fairness.
Alan Baker v. Allstate Insurance Company	2019	Imposed sanctions in the amount of US$17,808 after plaintiff's attorney Christopher Hook sent widely publicized emails containing profanities and threats to counsel for Allstate.
SpaceX v. U.S. Air Force	2020	SpaceX was not entitled to relief after the Air Force awarded contracts to United Launch Alliance (ULA), Blue Origin, and Northrop Grumman to help those companies with costs of developing new rockets and infrastructure.
TikTok v. Trump	2020	Lawsuit challenging an executive order banning TikTok; the case impacted the nearly 80 million TikTok users in the United States and drew significant attention from the press. The case was voluntarily dismissed in the Central District of California in September 2020 and filed instead in the District of Columbia.
Doe v. Grindr	2023	A lawsuit against dating application Grindr, it involves a minor user who experiences harm on the platform through interactions. The case was then dismissed in the Central District of California in 2023, where the court determined that the claims are not actionable under Section 230 of the Communications Decency Act.

== See also ==
- List of African-American federal judges
- List of African-American jurists

Legal offices
Preceded by Gary L. Taylor	Judge of the United States District Court for the Central District of California; 2007–present	Incumbent
