= Greg Lansky =

French arist and former film producer and director

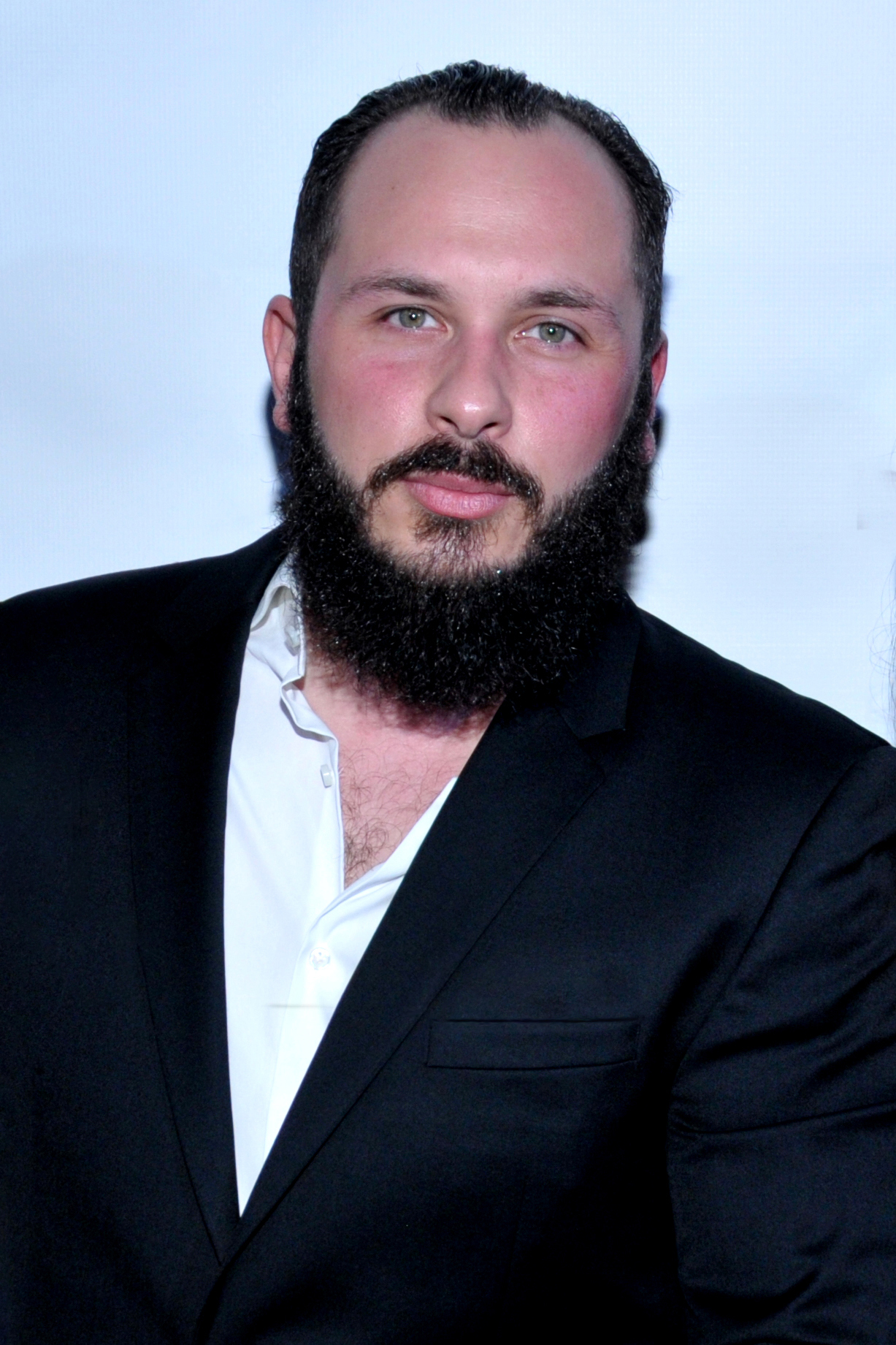
- Born: Paris, France
- Citizenship: American
- Occupations: Artist, investor, director, producer
- Years active: 2005–present
- Known for: Founder of Vixen Media Group
- Awards: AVN Director of the Year; XRCO Best Web Director
- Website: greglansky.com

Greg Lansky is a French artist, investor, and former pornographic film director and producer, based in the United States. Lansky was a founder and the Chief Executive Officer (CEO) of Vixen Media Group, one of the largest companies in the adult entertainment business, from its establishment in 2014 until January 2020 when he sold his full stake in the business. In 2022, Lansky debuted his sculpture "Algorithmic Beauty".

== Early life ==
Lansky was born in Paris, France. He has Algerian-Jewish heritage. Lansky attended marketing school in Paris and worked for various TV networks. After dropping out of school, he briefly worked in television production in Paris and interned with a production company that produced reality TV shows. Shortly after he moved to Los Angeles to pursue a career.

== Pornographic film career ==
In 2005, Lansky moved from Paris to Los Angeles and started working in adult entertainment industry. In 2006, Lansky was given a directorial contract. Lansky went on to direct many titles for New Sensations/Digital Sin until 2007. Lansky opened his production company and began directing and producing for the web-based adult network Reality Kings. Lansky stopped working for Reality Kings in 2014 to concentrate on creating his own company.

In 2014, Lansky founded Vixen Media Group, an independent Internet pornography production company located in Los Angeles, California, and established its suite of award-winning studios: Vixen, Blacked, and Tushy. In 2018, Lansky transitioned into running his company and producing rather than directing.

Rolling Stone profiled Lansky and his "adult entertainment empire," and Ad Age called him "a master of SFW marketing." Kanye West revealed on Jimmy Kimmel Live! that his favorite porn website was Lansky's Blacked. Lansky offered West the opportunity to direct an adult film, and the pair were photographed together backstage at the 2018 Pornhub Awards. Several hip hop artists have shown association with Lansky and his brands including Post Malone, Lil Pump and Trippie Redd.

Vixen Media Group owns and operates nine online adult film sites and Pulse Distribution distributes all of the company's films. The holding company of Vixen Media Group, Strike 3 Holdings, has, as of 2025, filed over 20,000 lawsuits since 2017 against people it alleges have infringed its copyright by illegally downloading Vixen Media Group pornographic films via BitTorrent. Few cases reach trial, with most being settled for four- or five-figure sums or dismissed. Vixen has won several major awards in the adult-film industry.

He sold his stake in Vixen Media Group in January 2020 to pursue other business ventures.

== Sculpture ==
In 2022, Lansky began releasing artwork online. In an ode to the Venus de Milo, "Algorithmic Beauty" is a six-foot eight-inch marble sculpture of a nude woman "covered in plastic-surgery scars, cellulite ripples across her posterior" holding up a mobile phone. His works have been considered divisive with some critics recognizing the insight into modern culture and the dark side of technology, while others dismiss it as superficial, crass and failing to make any substantial contribution to the discourse.

== Recognition ==
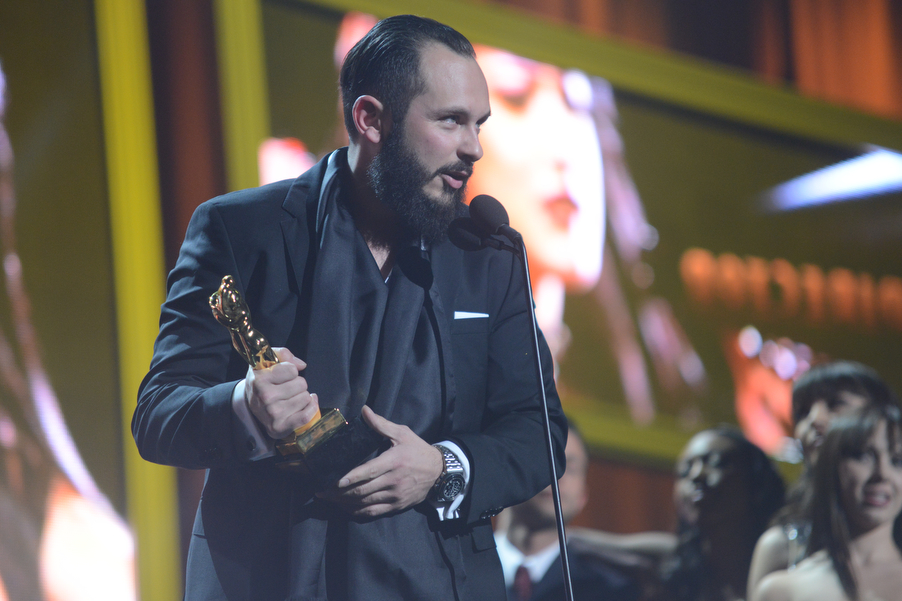
Greg Lansky at the 2016 AVN Awards in Las Vegas, NV

Lansky has been compared to Hugh Hefner and is credited with having "elevated the [adult] business as a whole." He was called "the most-pirated man in porn," and the movies his company produced are "some of the most-watched adult film content in the world." Lansky's Instagram was called "the most NSFW" profile of all time by GQ France.

=== Awards ===
During the 2018 AVN Awards, Lansky became the second man in history to ever win AVN Director of the Year three consecutive times.

- Best Web Director – XRCO Award – 2014
- Best Web Director – XRCO Award – 2015
- Best Director – XRCO Award – 2016
- Best Release – XRCO Award – 2016
- Best Cinematography – AVN Awards – 2016
- Director of the Year – AVN Awards – 2016
- Best Director – NightMoves Award – 2016 (Editor's Choice)
- Director of the Year – AVN Awards – 2017
- Best Director – Non-Feature AVN Awards – 2017
- Best Marketing Campaign AVN Awards – 2017
- Director of the Year – Body of Work 2017 XBIZ Award
- Best new Studio: Vixen – DVDEROTIK Awards – 2017
- Director of the Year – AVN Awards – 2018
