= Strike 3 =

American holdings company

Strike 3 Holdings, LLC
- Type: Holding company
- Industry: Pornography
- Founded: 2015
- Founder: Greg Lansky
- Headquarters: Los Angeles, California, US
- Area served: Worldwide
- Subsidiaries: Vixen Media Group

Strike 3 Holdings, LLC is an American company incorporated in Delaware and based in Los Angeles. It is the parent company of the pornography production company Vixen Media Group (VMG). As of November 2025, it has filed more than 20,000 copyright lawsuits against Internet users alleged to have pirated VMG and other Strike 3‍–‍owned pornographic films, making them the single most prolific filer of copyright lawsuits in the US. Critics have called the firm a copyright troll.

== History ==
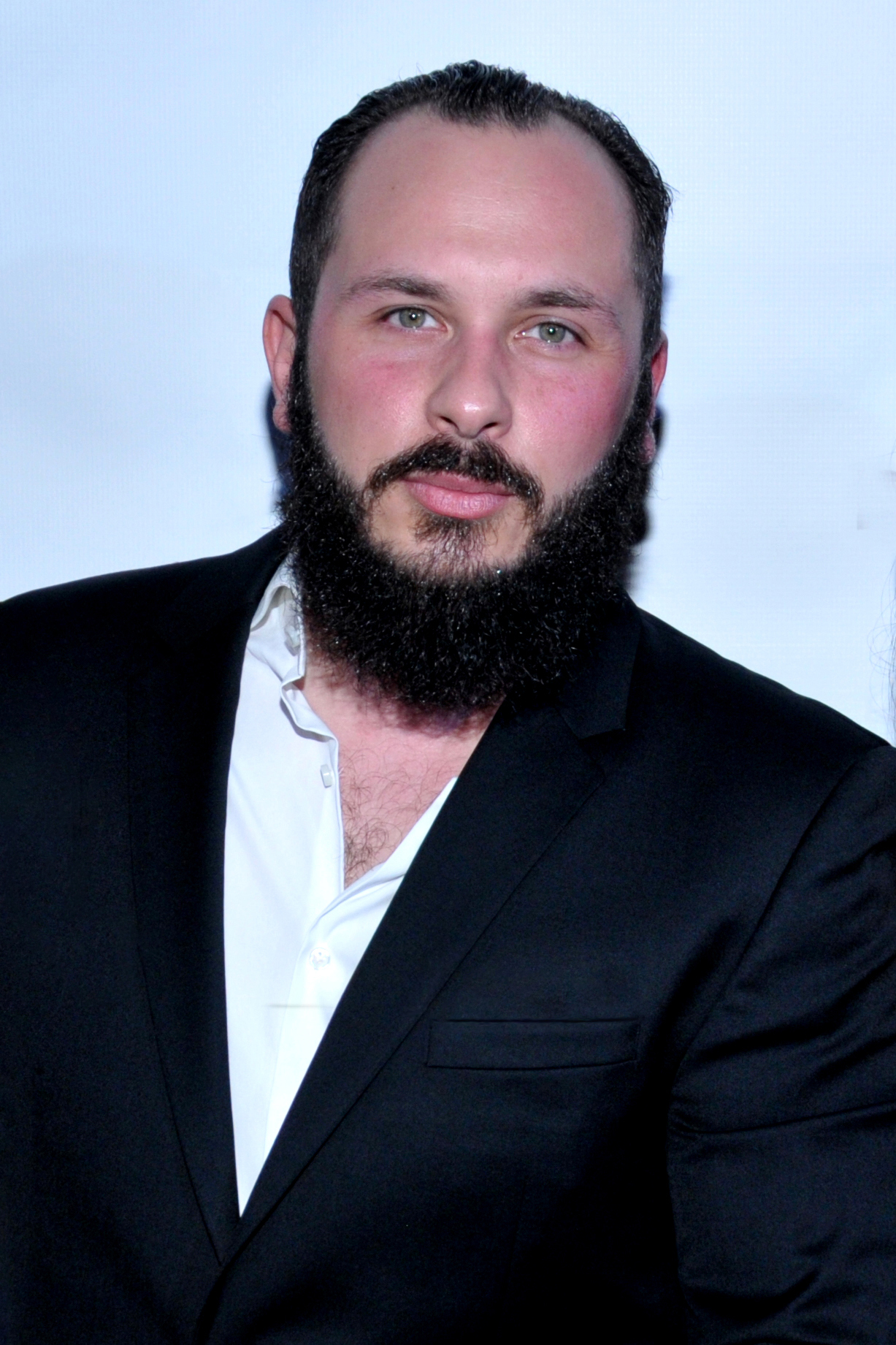
Co-founder Greg Lansky

In 2015, Greg Lansky incorporated Strike 3 as a holding company in Delaware. He had previously founded VMG, a pornography production company; he sold his stake in 2020. Strike 3 owns the copyright to around 2,000 adult films, mostly by VMG.

In September 2017, Strike 3 began a similar litigation campaign, which is continuing as of November 2025. It sues unknown, pseudonymous defendants, in the United States district court, identified only by their IP addresses, alleging that they have infringed the company's copyrighted pornographic films through BitTorrent uploads and downloads. Strike 3 would then file a request to issue a subpoena to the defendants' Internet service providers (ISPs) to obtain their personal information. The ISPs would then provide notice to the defendants, informing them of potential statutory damages for copyright infringement. It would then offer to settle for just under what a basic defense would cost. In July 2018, according to the Miami Herald, this was typically between $1,000 and $8,000. According to the attorney Steve Vondran, who has defended over 500 cases against Strike 3, in November 2025 the company generally settled for $750 per film, with settlements ranging from $20 to $30 thousand for dozens of films. The company initially identified defendants using a German detection tool before it began using its own tracking software, VXN Scan, in 2018. Strike 3 also contracted with xTakeDowns.com to send approximately 50,000 daily take-down notices to free pornography websites.

As of November 2025, only about ten out of Strike 3's more than 20,000 cases had resulted in litigation, rather than being settled or withdrawn, with no cases having gone to trial. The largest victory against Strike 3 was $47,777.26 in attorneys' fees. Strike 3 states that it engages in litigation to defend itself against piracy. In one case, the United States district court judge Royce Lamberth characterized its business model as "a high-tech shakedown" and said that it was treating the court "as an ATM."

Strike 3 sued Meta Platforms in July 2025, alleging that they had used at least 2,396 of their films for training artificial intelligence and that Meta had illegally distributed and seeded thousands of its videos on torrenting websites to more efficiently download other torrents. (Note: Torrent websites operate a "tit-for-tat" mechanism whereby those who provide and facilitate other users downloading popular content can download other content at higher speeds.) In response, Meta blamed employees, contractors, and visitors for their use, denied planning to produce AI-generated pornographic videos, and stated their terms prohibited generation of adult content. A judge ruled in favour of Strike 3 in June 2026, allowing the case to go to trial, stating that Meta's explanation “strains credulity.” and that the content appeared to have been downloaded as part of a mass scraping of piracy website Anna's Archive.

== See also ==
- Prenda Law
