= Gary L. Taylor =

American judge (born 1938)

Gary Lee Taylor

Senior Judge of the United States District Court for the Central District of California
- In office December 8, 2004 – July 1, 2005

Judge of the United States District Court for the Central District of California
- In office October 1, 1990 – December 8, 2004
- Appointed by: George H. W. Bush
- Preceded by: Ferdinand Fernandez
- Succeeded by: Otis D. Wright II

Judge of the Orange County Superior Court
- In office 1986–1990

Personal details
- Born: Gary Lee Hoisington; December 8, 1938 (age 87) Los Angeles, California, U.S.
- Spouse: Joanne J. Henrikson
- Education: University of California, Los Angeles (AB); UCLA School of Law (JD)

Military service
- Branch/service: United States Army
- Years of service: 1964–1966
- Rank: Captain
- Unit: Army Judge Advocate General Corps

Gary Lee Taylor (born December 8, 1938) is a retired United States district judge of the United States District Court for the Central District of California.

== Education and career ==
Born Gary Lee Hoisington in Los Angeles, California in 1938 his last name was changed to Taylor in 1945 when he was adopted. Taylor received an Artium Baccalaureus degree from the University of California, Los Angeles in 1960, and a Juris Doctor from the UCLA School of Law in 1963.

In 1963 he served as an assistant to the Dean of Foreign Students at the University of California, Los Angeles.

He served in the Judge Advocate General's Corps of the United States Army from 1964 to 1966, and was thereafter in private practice until 1986. He was a Judge on the Orange County Superior Court from 1986 to 1990.

== Federal judicial service ==
On August 3, 1990, Taylor was nominated by President George H. W. Bush to a seat on the United States District Court for the Central District of California vacated by Judge Ferdinand Fernandez. Taylor was confirmed by the United States Senate on September 28, 1990 and received his commission on October 1, 1990. He assumed senior status on December 8, 2004, and retired from the bench entirely on July 1, 2005. He is currently associated with Judicial Arbitration & Mediation Services.

== Sources ==
- FJC Bio

Legal offices
Preceded by Ferdinand Fernandez	Judge of the United States District Court for the Central District of California; 1990–2004	Succeeded by Otis D. Wright II
