= Prenda Law =

Former law firm involved in deceptive copyright law practices

Prenda Law Inc.
- Industry: Law
- Predecessor: Steele|Hansmeier PLLP
- Defunct: July 2013
- Fate: Dissolved following adverse legal rulings, principals disbarred
- Successor: Anti-Piracy Law Group, Alpha Law Firm LLC, Class Justice LLC (as stated by onlookers)
- Headquarters: Chicago, Illinois, United States of America
- Number of locations: Primary locations understood to be staff or offices in Florida, and perhaps Minnesota
- Area served: United States generally
- Key people: John Steele, Paul Hansmeier, Paul Duffy
- Revenue: Around US$1.93 million in 2012, according to alleged documents presented in court, and $15m total over lifetime until 2012 according to John Steele.
- Website: (defunct: mirrored website on archive.org @ March 2012)

Prenda Law, also known as Steele|Hansmeier PLLP and Anti-Piracy Law Group, was a Chicago-based law firm that ostensibly operated by undertaking litigation against alleged copyright infringement. However, it was later characterized by the United States District Court for Central California in a May 2013 ruling as a "porno-trolling collective" whose business model "relie[d] on deception", and which resembled most closely a conspiracy and racketeering enterprise, referring in the judgment to RICO, the U.S. federal anti-racketeering law. The firm ostensibly dissolved itself in July 2013 shortly after the adverse ruling although onlookers described Alpha Law Firm LLC as its apparent replacement. In 2014, the ABA Journal described the "Prenda Law saga" as having entered "legal folklore".

In the 2013 civil ruling, Prenda Law and three named principals, John Steele, Paul Hansmeier, and Paul Duffy, were found to have undertaken vexatious litigation, identity theft, misrepresentation and calculated deception (including "fraudulent signature"), professional misconduct and to have shown moral turpitude. The principals were also deemed to have founded and been the de facto owners and officers of the shell company which plaintiff and their alleged "client" created to "give an appearance of legitimacy".

The firm and its principals were fined; the matter was also referred to the United States Attorney for Central California (for criminal indictment consideration) and the IRS Criminal Investigation Division (for tax fraud consideration). A fourth attorney, Brett Gibbs, was also sanctioned, fined, and referred to a disciplinary committee by the court for false statements and his part in the subsequent cover-up, though described as their employee. (Gibbs' monetary sanctions were later vacated after turning whistleblower as part of his appeal.)

Other federal courts in various states later ruled in a similar manner against the firm and others linked to it, including a ruling of fraud upon the court in a Minnesota court review of five closed cases and "relentless willingness to lie" in an Illinois court. Criminal prosecutor referrals also occurred or were suggested in other jurisdictions.

In 2019, Steele and Hansmeier both pleaded guilty in federal court to a range of criminal charges related to and including extortion and fraudulent conduct, with substantial sums of their criminal proceeds to be reimbursed. Steele received a reduced sentence of five years due to his cooperation and Hansmeier, who had not cooperated, was sentenced to 14 years.

== Modus operandi ==
As described in the ruling and media coverage, the firm's modus operandi was to threaten individual members of the public with litigation (hence public exposure) over allegations that they breached copyright during pornographic downloads (based, according to the court, on a "statistical guess"). The firm would then offer to settle the case (silently) for a little below the cost of an active legal defense, in what was described by the court as an "extortion payment". Cases with robust defendants and non-profitable cases were dropped. At times the firm acted for client corporations whose filed papers contained discredited signatures and identities found false by the courts—commenters characterized the firm's plaintiffs as often (though not always) being shell companies operated for the firm and/or attorneys' own benefit. A federal district court described Prenda's principal attorneys in 2013 as "engaging [a] cloak of shell companies and fraud", and comments of "shocking" and apparent "shell game activity" by Seventh Circuit Court of Appeals judges at the inability or refusal to describe relationships between the law firms, "clients" and principals. An expert witness affidavit stated that IP addresses linked to Prenda's Minnesota and Florida offices and John Steele, had themselves been identified in 2013 as the initial "seeders" (sharers) of some pornographic media, tagged for "fast" sharing on file-sharing networks, which would be followed up by threat of legal action, with Prenda as the pornography producer or copyright purchaser, file sharer (offeror), plaintiff, and plaintiff's attorney; the suspect IP, linked to unauthorized media distribution, was confirmed as Steele and Hansmeier's by Comcast. In some cases hacking was alleged, or claims that the defendant was one of hundreds or thousands of "co-conspirators" for whom non-party subpoenas and discovery were sought; in one case the defendant testified he was in effect offered an ultimatum to act as a "sham" defendant and collusively agree to be sued.

Commentators writing for Salon, Law360, JETLaw, Forbes, The Consumerist, and The Register described the business as a copyright troll or as "notorious" for trolling, while tech website Ars Technica described the judge as coming at the firm and its principals "like a tornado".

In December 2016, Steele and Hansmeier were arrested by federal authorities and charged with 18 counts of running a multimillion-dollar extortion scheme between 2011 and 2014. (Duffy had died before that date)

In December 2016 Steele was indicted by a federal grand jury in Minneapolis for his role in the scheme. The following March, he pleaded guilty to federal charges of conspiracy to commit mail and wire fraud and conspiracy to launder money "from his role in an alleged shakedown scheme allegedly designed to entrap and extract millions of dollars in settlements from those accused of illegally downloading internet porn". He was subsequently disbarred by the Illinois Supreme Court in May 2017. In July 2019 he was sentenced to five years in prison and ordered to pay, jointly and severally with Hansmeier, restitution in the amount of $1,541,527.37.

Hansmeier initially pleaded not guilty, on the ground that a plaintiff was entitled to file a claim for damages, even on slim grounds, provided actual grounds might exist, and see if a court agreed or disagreed on its validity (hence arguing that his conduct had been within the law), but later changed his plea to guilty. On June 14, 2019, U.S. District Judge Joan Ericksen sentenced him to fourteen years in prison. In February 2021, the Court of Appeals for the Eighth Circuit upheld Judge Ericksen's order denying Hansmeier's motion to dismiss and to pay restitution in the amount of $1,541,527.37.

== History ==
Plaintiffs have outmaneuvered the legal system. They've discovered the nexus of antiquated copyright laws, paralyzing social stigma, and unaffordable defense costs. And they exploit this anomaly by accusing individuals of illegally downloading a single pornographic video. Then they offer to settle—for a sum calculated to be just below the cost of a bare-bones defense...So, now, copyright laws originally designed to compensate starving artists allow starving attorneys in this electronic-media era to plunder the citizenry.

— Wright ruling, Ingenuity 13 vs. Doe, 6 May 2013

Prenda first came to prominence through the practice of identifying the IP addresses of Internet subscribers who, it claims, downloaded copyrighted pornographic videos or "hacked" into pornography-related clients. The firm would file copyright infringement lawsuits in federal court, in which it requested "up front" early discovery via "over-broad" subpoenas against the respective Internet service providers (ISPs), upon sometimes-deceptive grounds and at times with falsified signatures on key documents These discoveries were used to obtain names and addresses of hundreds or even thousands of subscribers said to be infringers or "co-conspirators" in some cases.

The subscribers concerned—who might have had no responsibility for any alleged download due to Prenda's lack of care over innocent targets—were then written to, and accused of copyright infringement or computer misuse, and threatened with over $150,000 in statutory penalties or told of the possibility of higher damages if the matter was decided in court, and that refusal to pay would cause the recipient's name, together with the names of alleged pornographic videos, to be entered on public court documents, publicly exposing the subscribers' supposed pornographic interest and trial for alleged downloading. That is, the recipient would be stigmatized and identified to the public (e.g., to friends, employers, spouse, children, coworkers, etc.) as someone who had illegally downloaded specific pornography titles on the internet, and been sued in court for doing so. At times, what were sometimes seen as veiled threats were also made, that household members, neighbors, and visitors to the household would be formally asked if they had been responsible for the download of the pornographic material on the defendant's network, as part of their investigation, if they continued not to pay. The letters then offered to make the case go away "silently" for a fee—$4,000 was the price of silence offered to some. The amount demanded was usually slightly less than a typical attorney would charge to defend the case on its merits (as alluded to in the ruling on Ingenuity 13 (below)), so under the "American rule" for legal costs even the completely innocent would have a strong incentive to pay what Los Angeles-based U.S. District Judge Otis D. Wright II called an "extortion payment".

Alan Cooper claimed in his 2013 testimony, that an attorney ruled to be one of Prenda's principals had stated to him that "his goal was $10,000 a day, to have a mailing of these letters. ... [t]hat he would just send out a letter stating that if they didn't send a check for a certain amount, that he would make it public to these people's family and friends what they were looking at".

It was later testified and ruled in various courts that many (although not all) of the firm's purported "clients" or "plaintiffs" only appeared to exist as shell companies or "fronts" for the principals themselves, and that in effect the principals had been litigating on their own behalf. Signatures and representatives purported to be of clients, were ruled to be falsified, with at least one identity "stolen" and one purported "representative" excluded from court. In a 2013 Minnesota review of five closed cases, none of the documents used to show standing were ruled to be credible. At times the law firm itself was also alleged to have been behind sharing of previously undistributed pornography on well-known video "piracy" websites – an apparent effort to induce litigable downloading.

The rewards reaped by what Judge Wright called the "porno-trolling collective" ran into the millions. Steele told Forbes magazine that his firm had filed over 350 lawsuits against more than 20,000 people, resulting in "a little less than $15 million" in settlements. Brett Gibbs testified in 2013 that based on documents shown to him, the firm's revenue from settlements was around $1.93 million in 2012, of which around 80% was ultimately distributed to the principals or their joint companies, rather than purported clients.

== Alleged file downloader litigation cases ==
Diagram adopted and used by Judge Wright in his May 6, 2013, ruling, showing the Court's current best understanding of plaintiff's relationships, described in the Ingenuity 13 v. Doe ruling as "obfuscated". (Original creator: Morgan Pietz, defense attorney for Doe)

=== "Ingenuity 13" case ===
In November 2012, Morgan Pietz was engaged as defense attorney against a case brought by Ingenuity 13, a Prenda "client". He stated that, in the course of case preparation, he noticed various anomalies within Prenda's past litigation. In one Florida case (Sunlust vs. Nguyen) decided November 2012, a Prenda employee, Mark Lutz, had also self-identified as the "representative" of pornography producer Sunlust Pictures but been unable to describe his principal or the client in any manner, nor state who paid him, and was ultimately excluded from the court case. Additionally when Prenda attorney John Steele visited the court and Lutz kept whispering to him, causing the judge to eventually ask Steele to identify himself, Steele had answered evasively, not disclosing his connection to the firm or the case. The case was dismissed as an "attempted fraud on the court", with the court also inviting a motion against Prenda principal Paul Duffy for "lack of candor". Pietz described these as "the first thing [he] started to wonder about". An attempt to investigate the offshore-registered plaintiff in his case, Ingenuity 13, also suggested that "someone had something to hide", as its owners and even the source of its copyrights had been heavily obscured. Pietz further discovered a recent claim in a Minnesota court by a man called Alan Cooper, who stated that his name and signature had been falsely used as owner-of-record for Ingenuity 13 and another Prenda client (a tape recording in which Steele threatened Cooper with litigation was played as evidence in court). Finally, an email dialog between Pietz and Ingenuity 13's attorney Brett Gibbs in which Pietz asked for clarification about the identity of "Alan Cooper" and sight of originals of documents certified as having been signed by "Alan Cooper", was stonewalled in what court onlookers described as a "rambling", "confused" and evasive manner. Brett Gibbs had also been one of the Prenda attorneys named in the Sunlust hearing.

Taken together, the circumstances caused Pietz to question to the court whether the claims and client relationships presented by the plaintiff were truthful, whether the plaintiffs were engaging in a fraud, and to collate and present his research into Prenda and its affiliates that "detail[ed] mysterious signatures, company addresses that appeared to belong to Steele's family members, and one entity that appeared to be run by a friend of Hansmeier", and which overall suggested "possible systemic fraud, perjury, lack of standing, undisclosed financial interests, and improper fee splitting". The case was heard by Judge Otis Wright, who declined the response to Pietz's defense and ordered Ingenuity 13 to show that the basis of its case, and its manner of identifying alleged offenders, was sufficient to safeguard innocent persons and subscribers from "simple coercion" and "harassment" (described as "the easy route"). Prenda in response tried and failed to get the judge removed and also to sue Cooper for defamation, but also "conspicuously avoid[ed] direct engagement" with the more serious counterclaims. Hansmeier eventually testified of one Prenda plaintiff company, that its business was buying copyrights to litigate against their downloaders, and that it had never paid any tax. Prenda also sought to end the case by requesting dismissal, which was also declined.

On February 7, 2013, the court instead ordered plaintiff's attorney Brett Gibbs to attend a hearing, to answer questions concerning the firm's conduct in the case. "More ominously" according to a legal onlooker, it also stated that "the Court perceives that Plaintiff may have defrauded the Court" based on Pietz's evidence, and that based upon testimony presented by and about the plaintiffs at the next hearing, "the Court will consider whether sanctions are appropriate, and if so, determine the proper punishment. This may include a monetary fine, incarceration, or other sanctions..." As well as the plaintiffs and Gibbs as their attorney, Steele, Hansmeier and his brother (who acted as a Prenda forensic investigator), Duffy, Lutz, and Cooper were also among those ordered by the court to attend.

On March 11, 2013, Judge Wright's courtroom manner was described by attorney-blogger and past prosecutor Ken White on Popehat, who had followed the case, as "a federal judge who was furious, intimately familiar with the case, and consummately prepared for the hearing... [and] made it explicitly, abundantly, frighteningly clear that he believes the principals of Prenda Law have engaged in misconduct – and that he means to get to the bottom of it." Alan Cooper testified first, that he had not signed or seen any papers related to Prenda, that "Alan Cooper" signatures on documents were not his, that he looked after one of John Steele's houses, and that Steele had stated he wanted to earn "$10,000 a day" litigating against downloaders, and that when Cooper had attempted to legally clarify that he was not the signatory of Prenda's documents, Steele began an escalating series of texts and voicemails whose interpretation (to White) clearly appeared to be intimidating Cooper into "back[ing] off". AT&T and Verizon, two major ISPs, testified that stays (court orders from other Prenda cases) had been ignored by Prenda and they were kept unaware of their issue. On the topic of Prenda's finances, Judge Wright made clear that he viewed the clients as shams that neither received settlement payments nor paid tax on any settlements, and that Prenda "basically prosecuted on their own behalf". Of the four main Prenda attorneys, only Gibbs attended and testified, coming across to White as "a young attorney out of his depth who fell in with the wrong crowd", but whose testimony in his own defense was contradicted at the hearing (Gibbs stated that he only had limited involvement in Prenda client "AF Holdings" but attorney Jason Sweet in the audience then stated to the court that Gibbs had previously self-identified as AF Holdings "national counsel").

On April 2, 2013, when Steele, Hansmeier and Duffy attended, the scrutiny of the court run by Judge Wright – who had sat on around 45 previous Prenda cases – had therefore long moved to "getting to the bottom" of the firm, rather than the specific case, and Wright opened by stating, "It should be clear by now that this court's focus has now shifted dramatically from the area of protecting intellectual property rights to attorney misconduct[,] such misconduct which I think brings discredit to the profession. That is much more of a concern now to this court than what this litigation initially was about." The plaintiffs had also been threatened with imprisonment and the three Prenda attorneys later described as "principals" had also appeared. However, the latter then chose to fall back upon their legal right to avoid self-incrimination under the Fifth Amendment, rather than answer questions of fact from the judge about the ownership, operations, and finances, of Prenda and its affiliates. Ken White, who had followed and documented the case, commented on April 2, 2013:

Their invocation of their Fifth Amendment rights in the face of that order is utterly unprecedented in my experience as a lawyer. In effect, the responsible lawyers for a law firm conducting litigation before a court have refused to explain that litigation to the court on the grounds that doing so could expose them to criminal prosecution. However well grounded in ... individual rights ... the invocation eviscerates their credibility... I expect that defense attorneys will file notice of it in every state and federal case Prenda Law has brought... The message will be stark: the attorneys directing this litigation just took the Fifth rather than answer another judge's questions about their conduct in this litigation campaign.

Despite the ongoing case, by May 30, 2013, according to BusinessWeek, Prenda Law had changed its name to the Anti-Piracy Law Group, and switched its continuing actions to state courts, BusinessWeek commenting that state court cases are not centrally listed or as easily found compared to federal court cases.

==== Ruling and subsequent events in the Ingenuity 13 case ====
Attorney Brett Gibbs claimed to have—but never produced—an original notarized signature of "Alan Cooper, Manager of Ingenuity 13 LLC".

On May 6, 2013, Judge Wright sanctioned Prenda Law and its "principals" Steele, Hansmeier, and Duffy, along with Gibbs, whom he termed "attorneys with shattered law practices", $81,319.72 (of which half was punitive) for "brazen misconduct and relentless fraud", "vexatious litigation", "[stealing] the identity of Alan Cooper", and "representations about their operations, relationships, and financial interests [that] varied from feigned ignorance to misstatements to outright lies". Wright also referred the attorneys to the U.S. Attorney's office and the Internal Revenue Service-Criminal Investigation Division for possible criminal prosecution; and to various federal and state bars for "moral turpitude unbecoming of an officer of the court". He also noted that Steele, Hansmeier, and Duffy had pleaded the Fifth Amendment privilege against self-incrimination when questioned.

Judge Wright also found that the attorneys "purposely ignored" his orders quashing subpoenas to ISPs so that ISPs would be "unaware of the vacatur and would turn over the requested subscriber information"; and had created sham companies such as "AF Holdings LLC" and "Ingenuity 13 LLC" "to give an appearance of legitimacy" to their pursuit of "easy money".

In a footnote, Wright wryly observed that the punitive portion of the award "is calculated to be just below the cost of an effective appeal", a nod to his finding that plaintiffs' settlement demands were set "just below the cost of a bare-bones defense".

Wright's order was replete with Star Trek references:

It was when the Court realized Plaintiffs engaged their cloak of shell companies and fraud that the Court went to battlestations... As evidence materialized, it turned out that Gibbs was just a redshirt... [Though] Plaintiffs boldly probe the outskirts of law, the only enterprise they resemble is RICO (a reference to federal criminal statutes regarding 'racketeer-influenced and corrupt organizations'). The federal agency eleven decks up (the U.S. Attorney's office on the 13th floor of the Los Angeles federal courthouse) is familiar with their prime directive and will gladly refit them for their next voyage.

Prenda, and attorney Paul Hansmeier, filed an "emergency motion" in the U.S. Court of Appeals for the Ninth Circuit seeking a stay of Judge Wright's sanctions order; it was denied without prejudice to the sanctioned parties' right to request a stay in Judge Wright's court. They then filed an ex parte motion seeking a stay from Wright. On May 21, 2013, Wright responded by ordering each sanctioned party ("Steele, Duffy, Hansmeier, Gibbs, AF Holdings, Ingenuity 13, and Prenda") to pay an additional $1,000 per day (to the clerk of the court), on top of the previously ordered $81,319.72 payable to John Doe's attorneys, until all sanctions are fully paid.

Hansmeier's application for admission to the bar of the Ninth Circuit was also provisionally denied by a court commissioner, citing his referral to professional bar and discipline committees, based on Judge Wright's finding of "moral turpitude". Hansmeier had sought admission to the Ninth Circuit bar to represent his wife in her objection to a class-action settlement, but was told he may not do so.

On May 20, 2013, attorneys Steele, Hansmeier, and Duffy secured and posted a bond of $101,650 on behalf of themselves, Prenda Law Inc., Ingenuity 13 LLC and AF Holdings LLC (but not Gibbs), to guarantee payment of Judge Wright's sanctions order if upheld on appeal. The amount of the bond was later raised to a total of $237,584 to cover a possible attorney fee award on appeal; the Prenda parties' appeal of this order was denied, 2-1, by a three-judge Ninth Circuit motions panel. The increased bond was to be filed by July 15, 2013.

==== Appeals against monetary sanctions ====
On October 17, 2013, Brett Gibbs offered a sworn statement, an unsworn motion, and alleged documents and claims concerning Prenda and its principals as part of an appeal against his sanction. The allegations and claims included:

- that Gibbs had openly and repeatedly testified at multiple cases and hearings, including testimony damaging to the firm's case such as identifying the voice recordings in AF Holdings v. Patel as being John Steele
- that Steele and Hansmeier tried to coerce or buy his silence and gain his dishonest representations in support of their position in return for covering his sanction bond, and had also tried to intimidate or discredit him (via "virtually fact-free" Bar complaints), but he had refused
- that he included for the court what he claimed to be in-house emails showing private communications within the firm, and financial statements showing over $1.9 million in settlement income in 2012
- that around 70% of all settlement monies (80% when other payments were added) had been paid to Steele and Hansmeier or their jointly owned company, although this left Prenda with a loss of almost $0.5 m for the year, which was inconsistent with the claim that these were arms length payments to previous owners
- that "it appears that neither the Profit and Loss Detail nor the Balance Sheet Detail show any payments to AF Holdings, Ingenuity 13 or other Plaintiffs represented by Prenda [which] supports the conclusion that these companies were not independent entities, but rather alter egos of Steele and Hansmeier."
- that Duffy, not a known "old owner", was described and paid internally as an "old owner"
- that court orders had also been ignored in cases he was not involved
- and a plea that his testimony had been valuable and his errors were due to unintended ignorance and in one case, personal error, and that he would testify on these if required.

The defendants claimed that while his wrongdoings were of a lesser scale, they were not trivial, and opposed lifting of the entire sanction. On November 7 Gibbs' request was granted and the monetary part of his sanctions withdrawn ("vacated") due to his "dissociation".

On November 18, 2013, the three principals appealed their sanctions, on the basis that the court had erred in combining elements of a civil and criminal hearing, in effect choosing elements of each and thereby failing to meet the requirements for a number of actions taken. Their claims included:

- if fixed penalties were proposed or imposed, these would be criminal and not civil responses and required contempt hearings
- that the defense lawyer acted in effect as a prosecutor but lacked the requisite disinterest
- that no substantial evidence was presented for the conclusions about plaintiff company ownership
- that abrupt termination of hearings and refusal to hear certain persons had meant important testimony was not heard or cross-examined
- that a number of the procedural failings were due to Gibbs and not the three principals
- and that the court had generally exceeded its authority.

The appeal, styled Paul Hansmeier, Esq. v. John Doe, was heard before the Ninth Circuit Court of Appeals on May 4, 2015. A video recording of the oral argument is publicly available. The appeal was denied on June 10, 2016.

The Ninth Circuit held that:

"The district court did not abuse its discretion in finding bad faith and sanctioning the Prenda Principals under its inherent power. ... Based on the myriad of information before it—including depositions and court documents from other cases around the country where the Prenda Principals were found contradicting themselves, evading questioning, and possibly committing identity theft and fraud on the courts—it was not an abuse of discretion for Judge Wright to find that Steele, Hansmeier, and Duffy were principals and the parties actually responsible for the abusive litigation. Similarly, it was not an abuse of discretion for Judge Wright to find that the Prenda Principals were indeed the leaders and decision-makers behind Prenda Law's national trolling scheme. ... Judge Wright found, inter alia, that the Prenda Principals 'demonstrated their willingness to deceive not just this [c]ourt, but other courts where they have appeared,' and 'borrow[ed] the authority of the [c]ourt to pressure settlement.' ... The doubling of the attorney's fees award was also appropriate. ... The Prenda Principals have engaged in abusive litigation, fraud on courts across the country, and willful violation of court orders. They have lied to other courts about their ability to pay sanctions. They also failed to pay their own attorney's fees in this case."

==== Responses to rulings ====
Attorney John Steele, who denied having any "ownership interest" in Prenda Law, told Adult Video News that "he has faith in the appellate process" and complained that his attorneys were not permitted to present "evidence or testimony". He denied ever practicing law in California, and claimed he had "satisfied" previous inquiries from the Illinois State Bar, and stated that Livewire Holdings, identified by Judge Wright as being a member of the Prenda family, "is filing multiple new cases this week (the week of May 6, 2013)".

Morgan Pietz, who was awarded $76,752.52 of the sanctions award for his fees and costs, described Prenda Law as "the courtroom equivalent of a common bully". Pietz credited the efforts of "a number of attorneys all over the country [who helped] unravel the puzzle pieces and reveal [Prenda Law] for what they are, profiteering copyright trolls who are abusing the law".

=== AF Holding vs. Navasca ===
AF Holdings v. Navasca (California) was another Prenda case decided in 2013. As with the signature by "Alan Cooper" in Ingenuity 13, during April and May 2013, the judge in Navasca expressed curiosity about a signature by "Salt Marsh" on behalf of Prenda client AF Holdings, ordering the original to be produced. Paul Duffy stated he did not know, and Mark Lutz stated he had signed for the client but no longer had the original. Salt Marsh, originally identified as an individual person, was later stated to be a trust for the benefit of Lutz' family, however as plaintiff filings variously stated that "Salt Marsh" was an "individual", and that the individual had read various documents and discussed dispute options the court sought the identity of the person who had read, discussed, and signed for the client. Commentators identified that a man named "Saltmarsh" had multiple connections and shared residences with both Steele and other Prenda shell companies, but whether this was the same "Saltmarsh" was unknown. After the events of early 2013 in Ingenuity 13 v. Does (above), Prenda and AF Holdings sought dismissal of "numerous cases" in Californian federal courts, including Navasca. The judge denied the dismissal, ruling that Prenda's prior actions in Nevasca seemed to be connected to their desire to prevent discovery of damaging evidence which might also impact the Ingenuity 13 case, Prenda's disinclination (as in other Prenda cases) to post a bond to support their case (the court ruled: "A plaintiff cannot invoke the benefits of the judicial system without being prepared to satisfy its obligations as a litigant"), and described it as "telling that AF moved for a voluntary dismissal only two days after... problems related to its standing were explored and exposed by Mr. Navasca". The case was subsequently dismissed with prejudice by the court, as "AF's counsel has now substantially complied with the Court's order". Ken White commented on the ruling:

This [with prejudice] order is a body blow to Prenda Law. Judge Chen... is openly suggesting that Prenda's conduct suggests malfeasance and evasion of potential negative rulings. He invited Navasca to file a separate motion for fees, and this order strongly suggests that he will grant such a motion. Judge Chen's dismissal of Prenda's 'it doesn't matter if Cooper's signature is forged' argument suggests that he suspects that Prenda's entire litigation strategy is premised on fraud – that Prenda has manufactured the dispute, and that AF Holdings is merely a front for Prenda Law lawyers.

==== Motion by defense ====
On July 4, 2013, defense attorney Nicholas Ranallo filed a motion seeking an award for costs and legal fees against John Steele and Paul Hansmeier personally, rather than against Prenda or the plaintiffs. The motion summarized the known history and legal cases related to Prenda and its affiliates, and the findings of fraud upon the court, and stated the intent to "hold the individual attorneys that have knowingly committed fraud in this case responsible for their actions by making them jointly and severally liable for the costs and attorney fees incurred", since allegedly "[t]he evidence of fraud is clear and unrebutted, and the involvement of John Steele and Paul Hansmeier is likewise clear. The instant scheme was created by lawyers, for the benefit of lawyers, and it is entirely appropriate that these lawyers should bear the burden that their actions have caused". The motion cited evidence from several Prenda cases, including:

Evidence cited about Salt Marsh, Alan Cooper, and client signatures and identities

- The "Alan Cooper" and "Salt Marsh" signatures on court-filed documents, and Prenda's failure or inability to produce the individuals responsible or original signatures in both cases despite having (in Hansmeier's testimony) obtained those signatures personally.
- Anthony Saltmarsh and Alan Cooper as named identifiable individuals having known personal connections to Steele and Prenda, Steele's change of a GoDaddy account nameholder from "Steele" to "Cooper", and Cooper's denial of being the signatory of the document signed "Alan Cooper";
- Mark Lutz's statements that he represented at least one Prenda shell company, although under oath unable to describe even basic details of the company or evidence of being their "representative", his exclusion as a "fraud upon the court" in Sunlust vs. Nguyen (see below), and transcripts from that case;
- Brett Gibbs' testimony that he was directed by Steele and Hansmeier and had no personal contact with their clients;
- Steele and Hansmeier's reassurances to Gibbs that these issues and claims of fraud were mere "conspiracy theories" irrelevant to the litigation in Navasca;
- Testimony by Hansmeier that Steele had said the signatures were genuine, that "the only person who knows who this Alan Cooper is is John Steele", and testimony that Steele was asked by Lutz to find a "representative" for AF Holdings', for the purposes of litigation, and that Steele had denied these in a written statement claiming it was a favor at Alan Cooper's request, which were in turn denied by Cooper;
- AF Holdings filing, listing "Salt Marsh" under "Individuals Likely to Have Discoverable Information", and statements that this "Salt Marsh" had undertaken actions such as reading documents; contradicting later statements that "Salt Marsh" was a trust not an individual;

Other evidence cited

- Expert analysis of "a number of sources" implying that the file sharing account "sharkmp4" identified in First Time Videos v. Oppold (below), which had been linked forensically to Steele and Hansmeier's internet account, the expert conclusion that "the individual that controlled the GoDaddy accounts associated with John Steele... used the exact same IP address as the Pirate Bay user that posted links...on the Pirate Bay [...including...] links to Prenda Law works before those works were publicly available from any source", and that "all three entities [John Steele, 6881 Forensics, and sharkmp4] appear under the same control";
- Judicial findings in Ingenuity 13 and other cases of fraud and deception, and the decision by three Prenda principals to plead the Fifth Amendment rather than explain how they conducted their litigation;
- Changing and contradictory stories by plaintiff-related parties;

=== Other cases involving findings of fraud, deception, or other irregularities ===
In Sunlust vs. Nguyen, at a November 27, 2012, hearing before U.S. District Judge Mary S. Scriven of the Middle District of Florida, paralegal Mark Lutz claimed to be a "corporate representative" of Prenda's "client" "Sunlust Pictures." However, when placed under oath and questioned by Judge Scriven, Lutz could not name any of Sunlust's officers or directors, nor could he recall who signs his paychecks. As a result, Lutz was excluded as a plaintiff representative by the court. Plaintiff's attorney John Torres, stated on oath that he was engaged by Prenda Law through Brett Gibbs as principal, although with no contract or other documents and unable to identify his general counsel; Paul Duffy of Prenda Law had denied involvement, stating that the firm was not engaged or a principal attorney in the case. John Steele, present in court and discussing with plaintiff attorneys, described himself as "an attorney but not involved in this case", to which defense counsel Syfert stated that in fact Lutz had previously worked for Steele and Prenda Law, and "he should have better information about the structure of Prenda Law" than he had stated. Following Lutz' exclusion and Torres' withdrawal from the case, Scriven stated she would entertain a motion for sanctions against Prenda and its attorneys for "attempted fraud on the Court", as well as against Duffy for "lack of candor" based upon Torres' testimony. The defense filed multiple motions for sanctions, but withdrew them all on May 20, 2013, observers concluded an out-of-court settlement had probably been reached instead.

On May 21, 2013, Hennepin County, Minnesota District Court Judge Ann L. Alton awarded no damages to Alan Cooper on his identity-theft claim against Steele and Prenda, but she ordered attorney Paul Hansmeier to "stop using Alan Cooper's name" and to "never, ever again send fraudulent demand letters". Alton said she will refer Hansmeier to the Minnesota Lawyers Professional Responsibility Board for [violating] "a whole lot of rules".

On June 3, 2013, in another Florida case (First Time Videos v. Oppold), the defense filed a declaration by expert witness Delvan Neville which accused Prenda Law of "seeding" its own content (which was not otherwise available) in an effort to induce copyright infringement. Neville's declaration presented digital forensic evidence that someone with access to the GoDaddy.com account of John Steele was also sharing pornographic content through Pirate Bay user "sharkmp4", following which, the Pirate Bay released its own logs of the user "sharkmp4" supporting the claims in the declaration. Syfert concluded: "Prenda Law's business structure is such that it is copyright-violating pirate, forensic pirate hunter, and attorney. It also appears that Prenda Law also wants to/has formed/is forming a corporate structure where it is: pornography producer, copyright holder, pornography pirate, forensic investigator, [law] firm, and debt collector." Prenda's connection with the suspect IP (formally assigned by Comcast to 'Steele Hansmeier PLLC'), which had been used by "sharkmp4" and was linked to unlicensed pornographic media distribution, was subsequently confirmed by Comcast in August 2013 following a subpoena in another Prenda case, AF Holdings v Patel.

In November 2013 (Minnesota v. Does), Prenda apparent shell AF Holdings was directed to repay settlements obtained from four alleged downloaders, in a ruling that stated there was no evidence the claims made were truthful, the copyrights described were held, authentic, or legally assigned by correct signature, and that "The copyright-assignment agreements [for] each complaint in each of these five cases are not what they purport to be. Alan Cooper denies signing either agreement and also denies giving anyone else the authority to sign them on his behalf. AF Holdings failed to produce any credible evidence that the assignments were authentic. The Court has been the victim of a fraud perpetrated by AF Holdings..." The court, as in other cases, referred the issues of misconduct to "federal and state law enforcement at the direction of the United States Attorney, the Minnesota Attorney General and the Boards of Professional Responsibility", noting that "The Court expressly disbelieves Steele's testimony" in explaining their use of Cooper's signature. The repayment was reversed on appeal in March 2014, as the magistrate judge had exceeded the "inherent authority of the court" and the signatures had not been material to the outcome.

== Other significant cases and legal events ==
=== AF Holdings v. Patel ("GoDaddy subpoena" case) ===
In July 2013, following an appearance by BitTorrent news site TorrentFreak's lead researcher, Andrew Norton as a defense expert witness; a Georgia federal court ordered discovery for both parties in a November 2012 case filed by AF Holdings, in which the plaintiff's attorney stated he was of counsel to Prenda Law and offered the law firm's telephone number and Brett Gibbs' email.

The case became relevant in the context of other cases because of its discovery evidence, which was at times referred to in other cases and courts. Information and audio records obtained from ISPs were alleged by the defendant to show that an account in attorney John Steele's name was used to access a domain registered to "Alan Cooper" and when re-registered to "Mark Lutz" retained Steele's email address; that audio recordings of support requests for a domain registered to "Alan Cooper" seemed to be "[the] same voice" but identify himself variously in the different calls as "Alan Cooper", "John", "John Steele" and "Mark Lutz"; that an IP address used to log into an account registered to "John Steele" was also found to be allegedly involved in uploading of copyrighted works for sharing as well; and that two plaintiff motions filed in the case contained metadata which, it was claimed, indicated they had been "authored by Paul Duffy" of Prenda.

In February 2014, with evidence in the underlying case and "cause" hearing stayed due to inclement weather, AF Holdings applied for Paul Duffy to be appointed as attorney pro hac vice (temporarily, "for this case only") after its prior attorney went back on active duty, and in March 2013 the case was ultimately dismissed with prejudice.

=== Litigation against Cooper, Cooper's attorney, and online bloggers ("chilling speech" cases) ===
In February 2013, Prenda Law, Steele and Duffy filed three similar lawsuits with identical titles in state courts in Illinois and Florida, each alleging defamation. The defendants in each case were Alan Cooper (who had commenced litigation over the fraudulent misuse of his name in Prenda cases such as Ingenuity 13), Alan Cooper's attorney Paul Godfread (who alerted judiciary to those concerns), and "Does" (all persons who had used or merely read, during a two-year period January 2011 to February 2013, two websites established by victims of online copyright trolling to oppose trolling and support trolling victims, along with the identities of the websites' founding bloggers).

- Prenda Law v. Godfread, et al. - IL. case 3:2013cv00207, original filing: ?13-L-001656 on February 12, 2012, moved to federal court March 1, 2013 (original claim defense, DMLP resources)
- Paul Duffy v. Godfread, et al. - IL. case 1:2013cv01569, original filing: 13-L-001656 on February 15, 2012, moved to federal court February 28, 2013 (original claim defense DMLP resources)

— Consolidated into a single case June 28, 2013 (motiongrant)

- Steele v. Godfread, et al. - FL. case 1:2013cv20741, original filing: 13–6680 CA 4 on February 25, 2012, moved to federal court March 1, 2013 (original claim (no defense filed), DMLP resources)

— Withdrawn via voluntary dismissal March 6, 2013, prior to defense (request)

Subpoenas seeking website visitor information were issued to Automattic (owner of WordPress) and Wild West Domains (part of GoDaddy), that hosted and registered the two websites. Automattic responded that the request was "overly broad" and "legally deficient and objectionable for numerous reasons" and would not be entertained, and the non-profit Electronic Frontier Foundation (EFF) announced almost at the same time that it would offer the anonymous website users free legal defense. Prenda's request for a subpoena was quashed on May 16, 2013, for failure to file a response, and Steele's case was dismissed voluntarily at his own request on March 6, 2013.

In a March 2014 ruling on the remaining lawsuits (now consolidated into a single case), Prenda and Duffy were ruled to have engaged in "unreasonable and vexacious" conduct and acted duplicitously; the ruling highlights in addition a finding that "to fabricate what a federal judge said in a ruling before another court falls well outside the bounds of proper advocacy and demonstrates a serious disregard for the judicial process". Godfread and Cooper were granted their motion for sanctions.

The cases were characterized by Techdirt as "basically defamation lawsuits" and in effect SLAPP lawsuits, whose purpose was to chill (i.e., discourage and avert) legitimate public discussions of Prenda and its principals' activities, and to obtain disclosure of online critics' personal information.

=== Allegations of defendant coercion and collusion with defendant who agreed to be sued ===
In Guava LLC vs. Merkel (similar to another case, Lightspeed v. Doe), the law practice focused on only one defendant, whom it asserted had "hacked" a website and was a member of a "conspiracy" who "colluded" with "multiple co-conspirators" using a "hacked" password to intercept and gain access to Guava's "financial information" and other confidential operational information about Guava's business. On the basis of that assertion, the plaintiffs and/or (according to defendant testimony) Prenda and its affiliates also sought to obtain details of numerous other potential targets, including ISP subpoenas concerning numerous other individuals, as well as damages from the defendant "in excess of $100,000".

The defendant in Guava testified that he was contacted by Prenda, and given an ultimatum: he could "agree to be sued", and if so Prenda would suggest a choice of attorney, and in return provide Prenda a copy of data concerning file sharing activities, following which his case would be dismissed, or he could pay $3,400 to close the case silently, or he would face the risk of heavy penalties [figures of $222,000 and $675,000 were cited from other cases] if the court found against him for file sharing a pornographic item for which Guava claimed to be copyright holder. The defendant's testimony included the statement that: "After subpoenas were served in the case against me, I learned of Guava LLC's and Prenda Law's practice of finding one John Doe to be a named defendant, and then discovering the names of and requesting settlement money from other John Does by issuing subpoenas to ISPs."

Upon filing the lawsuit the defendant's attorney then stipulated with Prenda that Prenda could issue subpoenas to the defendant's purported "co-conspirators". Defendant's attorney and Prenda's attorney then submitted an "agreed order" to the judge, who promptly signed it. Techdirt commented that "Judges in underfunded county courts are happy when defendant and plaintiff agree on something, and (often) endorse such agreements", and that this enabled Prenda and affiliates to issue subpoenas seeking the identities of untold hundreds or thousands of ISP subscribers, resulting in Prenda being able to send out hundreds or thousands of new demands for "settlement".

Ars Technica opined that in acting this way, Guava was in effect colluding with a "sham" defendant to obtain legal orders identifying other internet users who might be targeted, and that "fil[ing] fake lawsuits against defendants who were in bed with Prenda" was used by the plaintiffs to reduce the risk of a named defendant actually fighting the case in court; the defendant decided to testify about the arrangement after Prenda continued to demand money. The activist website "fightcopyrighttrolls.com" opined that the Guava LLC v. Skylar case, Arte de Oaxaca LLC v. Stacey Mullen [plaintiff: LW Holdings], and other cases with "a single mysterious defendant and...an 'agreed order' allowing unmasking [of] hundreds and thousands of ISP subscribers" might be examples of similar Prenda state court cases, in which plaintiffs and/or their affiliates might have in effect coerced individuals they claimed to be downloaders into "playing a defendant" in a "sham lawsuit" to get testimony and non-party subpoenas which could be similarly exploited through litigation.

File sharing writer and former copyright enforcer Ben Jones opined about the case, that "These [hacking] claims were, it seems, to get around the problems of having already sued and settled [Merkel's] copyright case. Using state laws they could file in state courts, and keep a distance between this case and the Doe case filed in DC that Merkel settled."

On January 22, 2013, four ISPs asked the court to quash subpoenas in Guava, on the grounds that "new information strongly indicates that the present action may be nothing more than a contrived lawsuit with no actual controversy", in which the defendant had agreed to act as a defendant "for the sole purpose of facilitating Guava's pursuit of non-party discovery..." The case was eventually dismissed with prejudice, and costs and legal fees of $63,367.52 were awarded against Guava LLC, Alpha Law Firm LLC (a further plaintiff with links to Prenda that had joined the case) and Guava's Counsel of Record.

== U.S. legal background ==
=== Signatures in the cases ===
Attorney Cathy Gellis commented on the significance of the "Salt Marsh" and "Alan Cooper" signatures on legal papers in Nevasca and Ingenuity 13, that: "[T]ransferring the copyright [to a Prenda "client"]... shows that someone has a copyright. It doesn't show that someone has standing to come into court to enforce it. Given that Prenda Law has been unable to substantiate who that someone is, all of these cases have become suspect on that basis". In a similar manner, "The 'Alan Cooper' problem... stems from certain paperwork allegedly 'signed' by a Mr. Cooper that doesn't seem to exist, thereby creating a fundamental standing issue for all these cases".

Legally, the act of knowingly falsifying a signature for a court document, or asserting a false statement about standing, would potentially be a fraud upon the court. Judge Wright stated in Ingenuity 13 that "Although the recipient of a copyright assignment need not sign the document, a forgery is still a forgery. And trying to pass that forged document by the Court smacks of fraud".

=== Case law related to purpose of judicial processes ===
Federal courts in the United States seek to procure the orderly, just and timely resolution of genuine controversies and disputes, which limits the purpose for which legal processes can be used, and their manner of use. In case law this has meant at times that motive becomes a distinction in US court cases, so that a case or motion perceived by the court to have an inappropriate motive or reason may be distinguished, and expedited subpoenas or discovery (against parties or non-parties) may be declined by a court if ill-suited to the circumstances or perceived to have an inappropriate purpose.

In "Righthaven LLC v. Hill" (Colorado federal court, with no connection to Prenda Law), a company had acquired legal rights for the sole purpose of obtaining income by suing copyright-breaching individuals. The court ruled that:

Plaintiff's business model relies in large part upon reaching settlement agreements with a minimal investment of time and effort... Plaintiff's wishes to the contrary, the courts are not merely tools for encouraging and exacting settlements from Defendants cowed by the potential costs of litigation and liability.

In "Disability Rights Council of Greater Washington v. Washington Metro. Area Transit Authority" (Washington federal court), expedited discovery had been sought, additionally only a short time was offered for defendants to respond. The court denied expedited discovery as being for an inappropriate motive and criticized as "brutally unfair" the short time-scale offered:

'[A] preliminary injunction is just that – preliminary' [citing Cobell v. Norton] ... plaintiffs are not seeking expedited discovery to gain evidence to get the court to preserve the status quo. They want to gather all the evidence they would need to radically transform the status quo, on an expedited basis.

=== US law on costs of litigation ===
US law differs from some other countries on how legal fees and court costs are allocated following litigation, in a way that impacts some kinds of litigation. Unlike most other common-law countries, the "American rule" stipulates that, while discretion and many exceptions exist, the general principle is that each side bears its own legal costs regardless of who wins, unless legally stated otherwise. This can avoid a deterrent effect against a poor plaintiff, but can also give even a defendant who might defend successfully, good incentive to settle and pay, if it will cost less than the likely cost of defense and any appeals, or they lack resources for the procedures that may be required.

== See also ==
- Strike 3
