= Wifey (website) =

Pornographic film studio

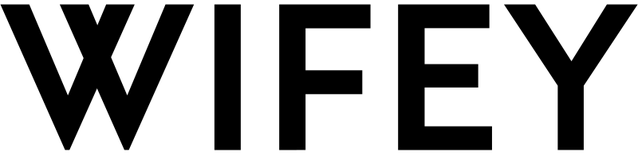
- Website type: Pornography
- Available in: English
- Headquarters: Los Angeles, California, U.S.
- Owner: Vixen Media Group
- Website: wifey.com
- Launched: March 19, 2025

Wifey is an American erotic entertainment brand and website launched in March 2025 by Vixen Media Group (VMG). The platform focuses on couples exploring consensual non-monogamy.

== History ==
Wifey was officially announced in March 2025 as part of VMG’s strategic expansion into new niches of erotic storytelling. According to VMG, Wifey blends high production values with an unscripted, emotionally grounded approach to adult content.

Shortly after its launch, Wifey received mainstream attention when it was mentioned on the daytime talk show The View, sparking conversation about consensual non-monogamy and its cultural visibility.

In October 2025 they announced Serenity Cox would be become the face of Wifey as their official Brand Ambassador.

== Concept and content ==
Wifey’s content centers on couples engaged in consensual non-monogamy, with a particular focus on the hotwife dynamic — a relationship model in which one partner (typically the woman) has sexual experiences outside the relationship with the knowledge and consent of the other partner.

== Parent company ==
Wifey is owned and operated by Vixen Media Group, a Los Angeles–based adult entertainment company founded in 2014.

== Reception ==
The launch of Wifey has been noted in both the adult industry and mainstream media for contributing to the growing visibility of consensual non-monogamy in popular culture. Outlets such as the New York Post and LA Weekly have contextualized the brand’s emergence alongside a broader cultural conversation about alternative relationship structures and sexual expression.

Critics have described the brand’s approach as an attempt to merge erotic content with relational authenticity, creating a niche distinct from more traditional studio porn. Supporters have highlighted its emphasis on real couples, consent, and communication, while some commentators have noted lingering stigmas surrounding hotwife dynamics in mainstream discourse.

== Awards ==
Year	Ceremony	Award	Status
2026	XBIZ Awards	Best Web Series	Nominated
2026	XBIZ Awards	Best New Studio/Imprint	Won
2026	XBIZ Awards	Best New Site	Won
2026	AVN Awards	Best New Production Brand/Banner	Won
