= Phoenix Marie =

American pornographic film actress

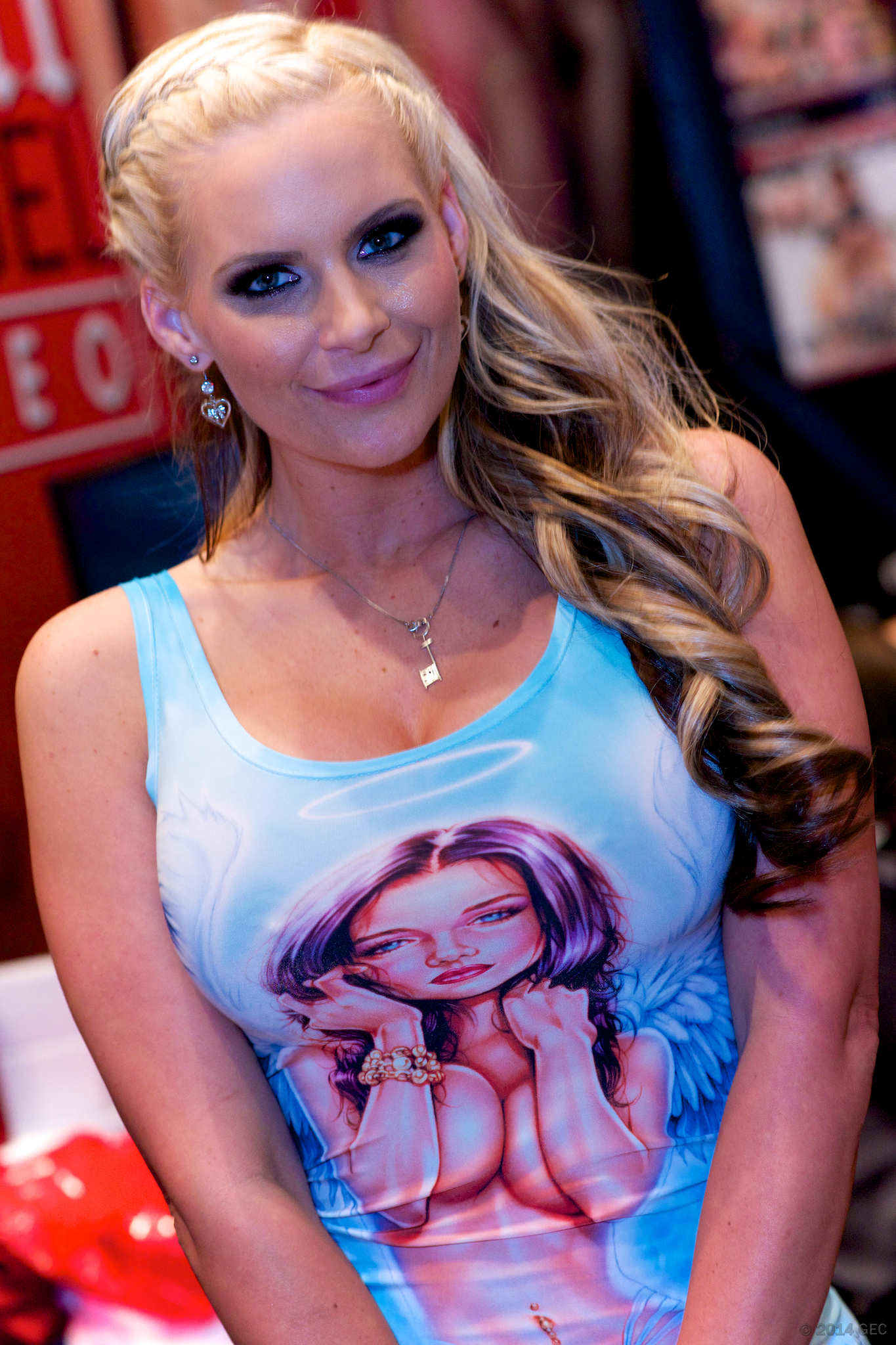
- Marie at the AVN Adult Entertainment Expo, 2014
- Occupation: Pornographic film actress
- Years active: 2010–present

Phoenix Marie is an American pornographic film actress. She has performed for studios including Brazzers, Evil Angel and Vixen Media Group, was Penthouse Pet of the Month for November 2010, and won the AVN Award for Best POV Sex Scene in 2015. She has been inducted into the AVN Hall of Fame, the XRCO Hall of Fame and the Urban X Awards Hall of Fame. In 2024 she brought a lawsuit against the pornography company Aylo and the performer and director Danny D over an incident on a shoot in Barcelona.

== Career ==
Marie was working as a performer by 2010, when her personal website was nominated for Porn Star Site of the Year at the 2011 XBIZ Awards. She was named Penthouse Pet of the Month for November 2010 and appeared on the cover of that issue.

At the inaugural Sex Awards in 2013 she shared the award for Hottest Sex Scene with Chanel Preston and Manuel Ferrara for Evil Anal 16, and in 2014 the website Juliland named her its jGrrl of the Year. In 2015 she won the AVN Award for Best POV Sex Scene with Lexington Steele for Lex's Point of View, and in 2017 she won Best Scene at the Transgender Erotica Awards alongside Aubrey Kate and Will Havoc.

Her scene with Aubrey Kate in the Brazzers release Prismatic was nominated for Best Sex Scene — Trans at the 2022 XBIZ Awards. In the 2020s she was also recognised in creator- and social-media categories, receiving nominations for Premium Social Media Star of the Year and Creator Brand Ambassador of the Year at the 2024 XBIZ Awards.

She continued to appear in new releases through the middle of the decade. Her work in the MILFY feature American MILF was nominated at the 2025 XMA Awards, and the MILFY release MILF Trio Phoenix Rachael and Tanya Share brought nominations at both the 2026 XMA Awards and the 2026 AVN Awards.

== Awards and nominations ==
Awards and nominations
Year	Award	Category	Work	Result
2011	XBIZ Award	Porn Star Site of the Year	PhoenixMarie.com	Nominated
2013	Sex Award	Hottest Sex Scene	Evil Anal 16 (with Chanel Preston and Manuel Ferrara)	Won
2014	Juliland Award	jGrrl of the Year	—N/a	Won
2015	AVN Award	Best POV Sex Scene	Lex's Point of View (with Lexington Steele)	Won
2017	Transgender Erotica Award	Best Scene	(with Aubrey Kate and Will Havoc)	Won
2022	XBIZ Award	Best Sex Scene — Trans	Prismatic (with Aubrey Kate)	Nominated
2024	XBIZ Award	Premium Social Media Star of the Year	—N/a	Nominated
2024	XBIZ Award	Creator Brand Ambassador of the Year	—N/a	Nominated
2025	XMA Award	Best Sex Scene — Comedy Movie	American MILF	Nominated
2026	XMA Award	Fav MILF Star	—N/a	Nominated
2026	XMA Award	Best Sex Scene — Orgy/Group (Male-Led)	MILF Trio Phoenix Rachael and Tanya Share	Nominated
2026	AVN Award	Best Foursome/Orgy Scene	MILF Trio Phoenix Rachael and Tanya Share (with Rachael Cavalli, Tanya Tate and Chocolate God)	Nominated

=== Halls of fame ===
- AVN Hall of Fame — inducted 2022
- XRCO Hall of Fame — inducted 2019
- Urban X Awards Hall of Fame — named among the inductees in 2017 and again in 2022

== Lawsuit ==
In 2024, Marie filed suit in Clark County district court in Nevada against the performer and director Danny D, the pornography company Aylo, its owner Ethical Capital Partners, three Aylo executives and a producer. The case was subsequently removed to federal court. AVN reported that the claims asserted included battery, sexual battery, conspiracy and defamation.

Danny D described the allegations as "completely false and unfounded", saying that footage, sign-in sheets and witness statements supported his account. Aylo and Ethical Capital Partners declined to comment on continuing litigation, saying they looked forward to "the facts being fully and fairly aired" in court.
