= Brandi Love =

American pornographic film actress (born 1973/1974)

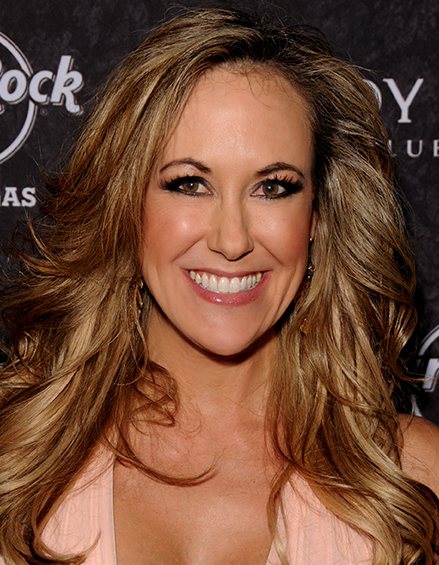
- Love in 2014
- Born: 1973 or 1974 (age 52–53); Dearborn, Michigan, U.S.
- Education: Central Michigan University
- Occupation: Pornographic film actress
- Years active: 2003–present
- Political party: Republican
- Spouse: Chris Potoski (m. 1994)
- Children: 1
- Relatives: Jesse Livermore (great-grandfather)
- Website: www.brandilove.com

Brandi Love (born 1973 or 1974) is an American pornographic film actress and conservative political activist. She is a member of the AVN and XRCO Halls of Fame.

== Personal life ==
Love was born in Dearborn, Michigan. She attended Central Michigan University, where she met Chris Potoski. They married in 1994 while still at university and as of 2018 they had one child, a daughter (born c. 2000). After she began her career in pornography, she and Potoski were investigated after Love's father and stepmother made a complaint to police regarding her and Potoski's daughter. She and her husband set up a now-defunct advocacy group, called Parents in Adult, as a result of the experience.

== Career ==
After Potoski suffered a heart attack brought on by the stress of his job, Love and he decided to make a career change. Already swingers, they started making pornography by recording themselves having sex and posting the videos on their own amateur pornography website in 2003. In 2006, she and Potoski collaborated with Falcon Foto to form Naked Rhino Media, a multimedia company creating niche pornographic content. In 2013, it was announced that Kelly Madison Media was developing a new website for Love and would take part in the production of new content.

In 2008, Love released her book, Getting Wild Sex from Your Conservative Woman, and appeared on an episode of Penn & Teller: Bullshit! titled "The War on Porn". Throughout her career as an adult film performer, she became known for her appearances in MILF and hot wife–themed productions.

== Political views ==
Love is a self-described conservative and Republican who supported Donald Trump and "voted for Bill Clinton back in the day". She has written articles for The Federalist, a conservative online magazine.

In July 2021, Love was expelled from a Florida conference by the conservative student organization Turning Point USA after attending several panels. Many conservatives denounced Love being admitted to a conference aimed towards younger students and minors, while Federalist co-founder Ben Domenech criticized the ban. Love denounced the ban as an example of cancel culture. She later told Newsweek that she would support a presidential campaign by Florida governor Ron DeSantis in 2024 if Trump declined to run again.

== Publications ==
- Love, Brandi; Thompson, Michelle (2008). Getting Wild Sex from Your Conservative Woman. Burman Books. ISBN 978-0-9781380-4-2.

== Awards ==
Year	Ceremony	Award	Work
2013	NightMoves Award	Best Cougar/MILF Performer (Editor's Choice)	—N/a
2018	XBIZ Award	MILF Performer of the Year	—N/a
2018	XBIZ Award	Best Actress – All-Girl Release	The Candidate
2018	NightMoves Award	Best MILF Performer (Fan's Choice)	—N/a
2018	Pornhub Award	Top MILF Performer	—N/a
2018	Pornhub Award	Favorite MILF	—N/a
2019	Pornhub Award	Top MILF Performer	—N/a
2019	Pornhub Award	Favorite MILF	—N/a
2019	XRCO Award	Hall of Fame	—N/a
2019	NightMoves Award	Best MILF Performer (Editor's Choice)	—N/a
2020	AVN Award	Hall of Fame	—N/a
2020	NightMoves Award	Best MILF Performer	—N/a
2022	XRCO Award	MILF of the Year	—N/a
2022	Fleshbot Award	Best MILF	—N/a
2025	XMA Award	Best Sex Scene – Comedy Movie	American MILF
