= Copyright troll =

Party that enforces copyrights for purposes of making money through litigation

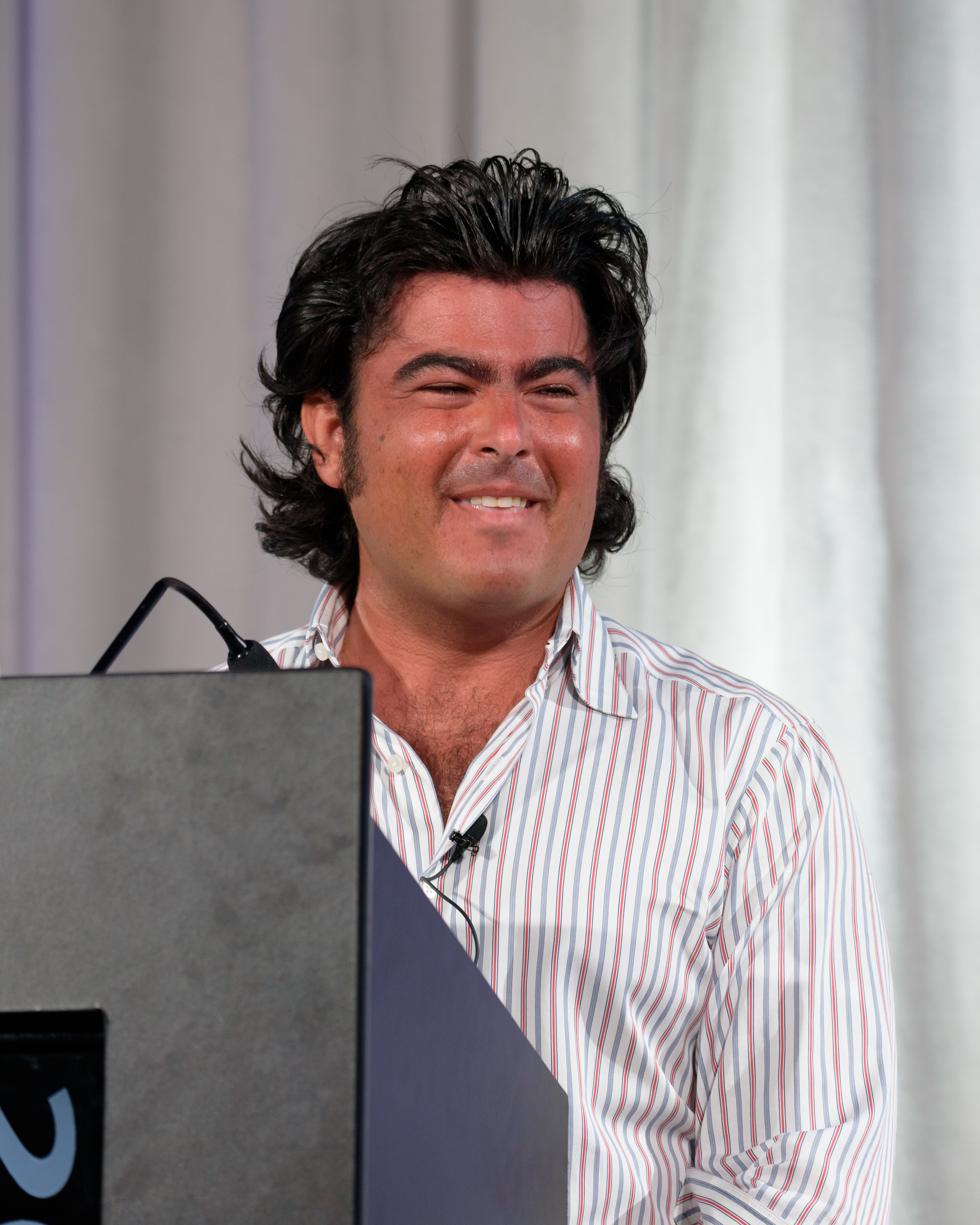
Richard Liebowitz, a New York–based attorney, was called a copyright troll in several lawsuits and was met by various sanctions.

A copyright troll is a party (person or company) that enforces copyrights it owns for purposes of making money through strategic litigation, in a manner considered unduly aggressive or opportunistic, sometimes without producing or licensing the works it owns for paid distribution. Critics object to the activity because they believe it does not encourage the production of creative works, but instead makes money through the inequities and unintended consequences of high statutory damages provisions in copyright laws intended to encourage creation of such works.

Both the term and the concept of a copyright troll began to appear in the mid-2000s. It derives from the pejorative "patent trolls", which are companies that enforce patent rights to earn money from companies that are selling products, without having products of their own for sale. It is distinguished from organizations such as ASCAP, which collect royalties and enforce copyrights of their members.

== Notable examples ==
=== Harry Wall ===
One commentator describes Harry Wall, husband of nineteenth-century British comic singer Annie Wall, as the world's first copyright troll. Wall set up "the Authors', Composers' and Artists' Copyright Protection Office", to collect fees for unauthorized performances of works by composers (often deceased) based on the threat of litigation for statutory damages under the Dramatic Copyright Act of 1842.

=== SCO Group ===
In the 2000s, the SCO Group's effort to obtain royalties in regards to the open source operating system Linux was viewed as copyright trolling by some of the approximately 1,500 companies from whom SCO demanded licensing royalties, based on a copyright that a court eventually ruled belonged instead to Novell. Novell, by contrast, had no interest or intention of enforcing its copyright against the alleged infringers.

=== Related to Google ===
The term was also applied to two parties that separately sued Google in 2006, after posting content they knew would be indexed by Google's Googlebot spider, with the industry standard "noindex" opt-out tags deliberately omitted.

After Perfect 10, Inc. v. Google Inc., adult magazine Perfect 10 was described as a copyright troll for setting up image links with the intent to sue Google for infringement after Google added them to its image search service.

In Field v. Google, a Nevada lawyer took "affirmative steps" to get his legal writings included in Google's search results so that he could sue Google, and was ruled to have acted in bad faith. More recently, the term has been used to describe entities that bring questionable claims against companies in the fashion industry over purported copyrights in fabric patterns.

=== Righthaven ===
In 2010, copyright holding company Righthaven LLC was called a copyright troll by commentators, after it purchased copyrights to a number of old news articles from Stephens Media, at the time the publisher of the Las Vegas Review-Journal, based on a business model of suing bloggers and other Internet authors for statutory damages for having reproduced the articles on their sites without permission.

The matter was covered by the Los Angeles Times, Bloomberg News, Wired News, Mother Jones, The Wall Street Journal, the Boston Herald, and other newspapers and news blogs, as well as the Electronic Frontier Foundation, which offered to assist the defendants. The paper's competitor, the Las Vegas Sun, covered all 107 of the lawsuits as of September 1, 2010, describing it as the first known instance of a copyright troll buying the rights to a news story based on finding that its copyright had been infringed. The Review-Journal's publisher responded by defending the lawsuits, and criticizing the Sun for covering them.

In August, 2010, the company entered an agreement with WEHCO Media in Arkansas to pursue similar actions, and announced that it was in negotiation with a number of other publishers. Wired magazine described the activity as "borrowing a page from the patent trolls", and noted that the company was demanding $75,000 from each infringer, and agreeing to settlements of several thousand dollars per defendant.

In April 2011, a Colorado court ruled in Righthaven v. Hill that:

Although Plaintiff's business model relies in large part upon reaching settlement agreements with a minimal investment of time and effort, the purpose of the courts is to provide a forum for the orderly, just, and timely resolution of controversies and disputes. Plaintiff's wishes to the contrary, the courts are not merely tools for encouraging and exacting settlements from Defendants cowed by the potential costs of litigation and liability.

By the second half of 2011, defendants with resources to fight Righthaven in court were winning cases on grounds that their usage fell within the fair use doctrine and that Stephens Media had actually not assigned full ownership of the copyrighted material to Righthaven. Righthaven was also sanctioned by at least one judge for failing to disclose that Stephens Media got a 50 percent cut of any lawsuit proceeds involving the Review-Journal. Successful defendants demanded court costs and legal fees, which Righthaven refused to pay. By December 2011, Righthaven was insolvent and on the auction block.

=== Visual Rights Group ===
In 2021, the term was used by a Belgian judge in reference to Permission Machine, which later changed its name to Visual Rights Group. This company scanned photos on the internet and sent large damage claims without asking for the removal of the material. In a case of 2 October 2024 the Court of Appeal of Antwerp dismissed this argument and praised the activities of these companies as necessary for the photographers and authors to uphold their rights.

=== Strike 3 ===
An American copyright trolling company, Strike 3, specializes in "porno-trolling", or accusing people of illegally downloading pornography, and offers to settle for just below the cost of legal representation, which almost all defendants do. In 2025, Strike 3 accounted for half of all federal copyright cases filed in the U.S.

== Legal defense ==
Two lawyers have provided a framework for a legal defense against copyright trolls. Since most of the lawsuits about online copyright infringement rely on a minimal amount of information that targets non-infringers as well as infringers, there are ways to defend against the lawsuit by defense lawyers and pro se defendants that are described in the framework.

== See also ==
- Copyfraud
- Patent troll
- Prenda Law
- Trademark troll
- SAD scheme
- Vexatious litigation
