= Casey Calvert =

American pornographic film actress (born 1989/1990)

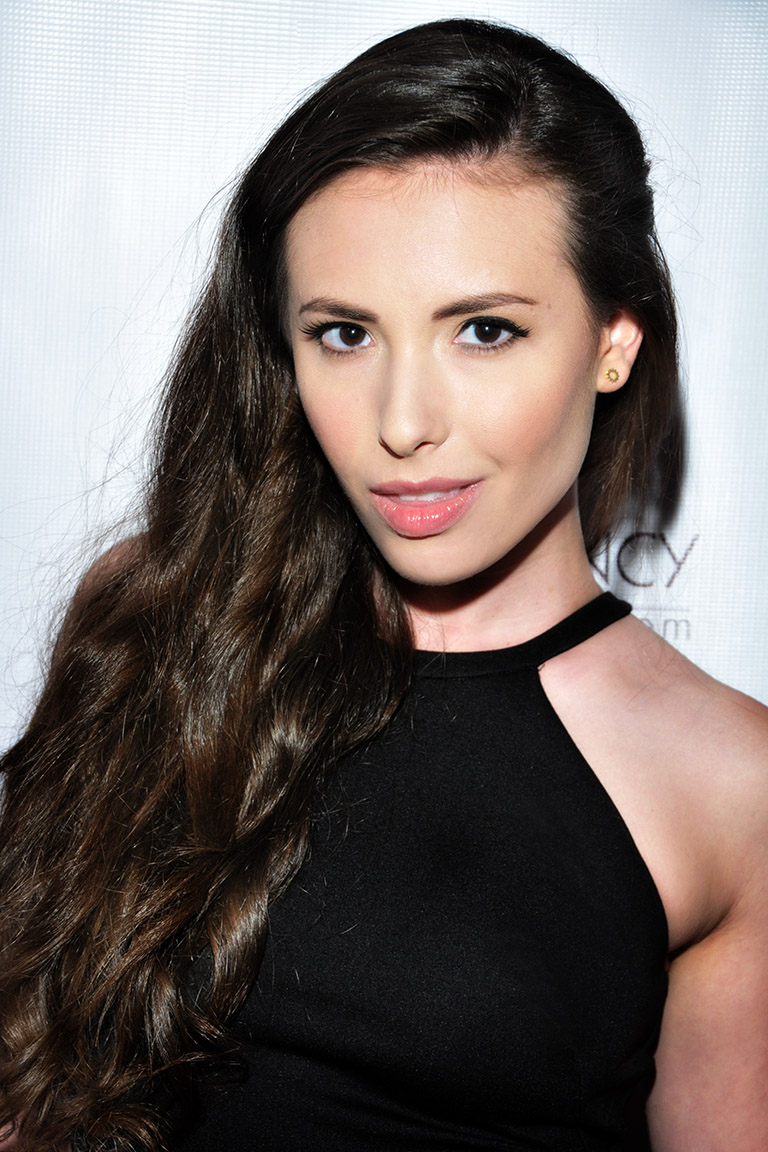
- Calvert in 2015
- Born: 1989 or 1990 (age 36–37)
- Education: University of Florida
- Occupations: Pornographic film actress; director; writer
- Years active: 2012–present
- Spouse: Eli Cross
- Awards: XRCO Award: Unsung Siren (2015, 2018); GameLink Tournament (2016); AVN Awards (multiple)
- Website: caseycalvert.com

Casey Calvert (born 1989 or 1990) is an American pornographic film actress and director. She entered the adult entertainment industry as an art model and fetish model at age 21, later performing in pornographic films starting in 2012. She chose her stage name after one of her college professors, Clay Calvert.

In 2015, Calvert began writing for mainstream publications including GameLink and The Huffington Post. She was a contributor to the 2015 book Coming Out Like a Porn Star, edited by Jiz Lee. Calvert was named Unsung Siren at the XRCO Awards in 2015, followed by an AVN Award for Best Group Sex Scene in 2017 and another XRCO Unsung Siren Award in 2018.

Calvert later broadened her involvement in adult films with work as a director and producer. She worked an actor, writer, and casting director on the Pure Taboo production, The Starlet: A Casey Calvert Story. Producer Erika Lust hired Calvert to direct a feature series titled Primary. By 2020, she was spending half her professional time directing adult films.

== Early life and education ==
Calvert was raised Conservative Jewish and attended synagogue every Shabbat (Saturday) morning until her Bat Mitzvah. Her family later switched to a Reform synagogue and began attending only on Jewish holidays. She spent her early life in Gainesville, Florida. Calvert attended the University of Florida College of Journalism and Communications, graduating with a degree in telecommunications with minors in anthropology and zoology. She chose her stage name in honor of Professor Clay Calvert after taking his class on Mass Media Law as a sophomore. She said, "It felt right because really if I hadn't taken his class, I wouldn't be where I am right now," referring to learning during his class that pornography was not illegal as she had initially thought. Pornography and laws related to the adult film industry were a focus of the media class. She also learned that pornography is a form of protected speech under the First Amendment in the United States. Calvert said that her stage first name, "Casey", is derived from the initials of her celebrity crush's children—K. and C.—but has not specified who they are.

== Career ==
=== Modeling and acting ===
Before appearing in adult films, Calvert worked as a nude model, doing fetish and art modeling in the spring of her junior year of college, at 21. She learned about the fetish scene from contacts in Orlando, Florida. Calvert is featured in The Mammoth Book of Erotic Photography. She modeled for Hustler's Taboo. She entered the adult film industry on November 5, 2012 with her first scene for SexArt studio. She launched her own website in January 2014.

Calvert has described her career as "just like having any other job, except you're naked on the Internet". According to online magazine Bustle, Calvert differs from adult film performers of the past in that she is "an educated woman who didn't stumble into porn, but headed there because that's what she wanted." She has performed in fetish and BDSM pornography, starring in Jessica Drake's Guide to Wicked Sex: BDSM for Beginners in 2015. She has also worked with fellow BDSM performer and director Bobbi Starr.

The X-Rated Critics Organization (XRCO) nominated Calvert for an XRCO Award for Best New Starlet in 2014, the first year she was eligible. She received an Unsung Siren Award from XRCO in 2015, being recognized her as "the female star who consistently demonstrates excellence without due recognition from the media". Sociologist and XRCO member Chauntelle Tibbals has praised Calvert's "considerable contributions to the adult industry".

Calvert gained experience as a director by creating custom videos for clients at up to $10,000 per request. Calvert saw these videos as a way to interact directly with her fans as well as a more reliable source of income in the face of online piracy. She has found billing clients difficult because of restrictions by payment processors related to sexual content. Calvert has also contributed her likeness to virtual reality pornography.

=== Writing and directing ===
The USC School of Cinematic Arts at the University of Southern California featured Calvert in 2015 on a panel discussion, "50 Shades of Erotica: The Blurring of the Line Between Hollywood and Adult Entertainment". In September 2015, GameLink hired Calvert to write a BDSM and fetish-themed column for their The Naked Truth blog, and to answer readers' questions on their website. She contributed to GameLink in 2016 as an expert on topics related to fetish and BDSM, and won their 2016 Porn Star Madness Competition against 16 other adult stars. Calvert wrote for GameLink once a month sharing her knowledge of fetish and BDSM gained from her experiences with readers. The company's vice president Jeff Dillon called Calvert a "great advocate for the BDSM/fetish lifestyle". She has written about pornography for The Huffington Post, Cosmopolitan, UPROXX, Mandatory.com, Refinery 29, CraveOnline and The Daily Beast. She contributed an essay in Coming Out Like a Porn Star, edited by Jiz Lee, about her early introduction to pornography and why she chose a career in the industry. The Economist included her essay in a 2015 discussion of Internet pornography, "Can porn be good for us?", featuring Calvert with advertising consultant Cindy Gallop and University of Texas at Austin journalism professor Robert Jensen. In January 2016, Calvert gave a sex education seminar, "BDSM: From Reel to Real", as part of the XBIZ events series. She taught the seminar to educate attendees about how BDSM and fetish scenes are filmed, and the film editing process.

Calvert also diversified her career by becoming a director. In 2019, Gamma Entertainment hired Calvert and her husband Eli Cross to direct films for the Adult Time platform. Her directorial debut with Adult Time was the series Maid for Each Other. Calvert worked with distributor Adult Time on a Pure Taboo production as actor, writer, and casting director, titled, The Starlet: A Casey Calvert Story. Calvert and Gamma Entertainment's head of production, Bree Mills, worked on the script. Calvert wrote her character as an antihero, exploring how fame and money have the potential to impact an individual's view of ethics. Mills described Calvert as "incredibly versatile, creative and intelligent as a writer and performer", who brought "a wealth of experience in writing, directing and producing from her own independent adult and mainstream projects" to the project. Calvert directed actresses Riley Reid and Aidra Fox, in the 2019 Girlsway series, Roleplay With Me, and actress Lauren Phillips in Schooled!.

Erika Lust hired Calvert to direct a feature series for LustCinema called Primary. Calvert also wrote the script. Inspired by the Netflix series, Easy, Calvert wrote a script of about 20–30 pages for each episode. The storyline is about four people living in Los Angeles and dealing with open relationships. Calvert shot Primary as a six-episode series. She was part of LustCinema's foray into production work in the United States. Calvert also led the casting process, taking her potential cast members through auditions. She directed actors including Penny Pax and Derrick Pierce. For this production, Calvert decided to include women filmmakers from mainstream cinema on her crew who had never worked on a pornographic film set. She filmed Primary over an 11-day production schedule. Calvert found the most difficult part of the production process was selecting sites for location shooting. She appreciated the increased freedom she had transitioning from actress to director. Journalist Mackenzie Cummings-Grady wrote of her directorial work, "The story is rich in details, and the cinematography, courtesy of breakout director Casey Calvert, is lush and captivating. It's some of the most opulent pornography ever created."

Calvert consulted with Jordyn Woods and advised her on how to support sex workers. She was featured at the 2020 AVN Adult Entertainment Expo on a panel, "Stepping Up to the Director's Seat", with women who had transitioned from actress to director including: Joanna Angel, Kayden Kross, Lena Paul and Aiden Starr. By 2020, half her time was spent as a film director.

== Personal life ==
Calvert identifies as a feminist. i-D magazine called her a "committed feminist", and observed, "for Casey, porn isn't about objectifying women, [or] empowering the male gaze ... It's about exercising her right to choose what she does with her body." Calvert told Caitlin Stasey she wanted to debunk stereotypes about female sex workers, "What I can say is that not all sex workers are the stereotype people want to believe. Many of us are college educated, feminists, and absolutely love what we do." She explained her views on feminism to author Rich Moreland in the book, Pornography Feminism: As Powerful as She Wants to Be, saying, "Feminism is all about the right to choice."

She is married to industry director Eli Cross. They have been together since 2013; he also acts as her cinematographer. They got to know each other through film production work together. Her family is supportive of her career and Calvert maintains a good relationship with her mother and father. Before the start of her career in adult film, Calvert moved from Florida to Los Angeles, where she works and resides.

== Filmmaker credits ==
=== Film ===
As director, writer, or producer

Year	Title				
Year	Title	Director	Writer	Producer	Notes
2014	Mother-Daughter Affair	No	Yes	No	Directed by James Avalon
2014	Shades of Kink 3	No	Yes	No	Directed by James Avalon
2019	Maid for Each Other	Yes	No	No	Produced by Bree Mills
2019	Dance with Me	Yes	No	No	Produced by Bree Mills and Bryn Pryor
2019	Overprotective	Yes	No	No	Produced by Bree Mills
2019	Teenage Secrets	Yes	No	No	Produced by Bree Mills
2020	Cougariffic	Yes	No	No	Produced by Bree Mills
2020	The Look Mom Can't Resist	Yes	No	No	Produced by Bree Mills
2020	In Bed with My Stepsister	Yes	No	No	Produced by Bree Mills
2020	Lesbian Recruiters	Yes	No	No	Produced by Bree Mills
2020	The Right Hole	Yes	No	No	Produced by Bree Mills
2020	Sapphic School	Yes	No	No	Produced by Bree Mills
2020	Mommy's Dream	Yes	No	No	Produced by Bree Mills
2020	Benefits of Massage	Yes	No	No	Produced by Bree Mills
2020	Learning from the Best	Yes	No	No	Produced by Bree Mills
2020	The Pick-Up Artist	Yes	No	No	Produced by Bree Mills
2020	Fam Fiction	Yes	No	No	Produced by Bree Mills
2020	Shape of Beauty Volume 4	Yes	No	No	Produced by Bree Mills
2020	My Daughter's Engaged	Yes	No	No	Produced by Bree Mills
2020	Making Mommy Jealous	Yes	No	No	Produced by Bree Mills
2020	Devious Moms	Yes	No	No	Co-directed by Bryn Pryor
2020	Complimentary Massage	Yes	No	No	Produced by Bree Mills

=== Television ===
As director, writer, or producer

Year	Title				
Year	Title	Director	Writer	Producer	Notes
2019	Moms on Moms	Yes	No	No	Director, 3 episodes
2019	Roleplay With Me	Yes	No	No	Director, 3 episodes
2019	Schooled!	Yes	No	No	Director, 1 episode
2019–2020	Mommy's Girl	Yes	No	Yes	Director, 37 episodes
2019–2020	Girls Try Anal	Yes	No	No	Director, 7 episodes
2019–2020	Web Young	Yes	No	No	Director, 14 episodes
2019–2020	All Girl Massage	Yes	No	No	Director, 15 episodes
2019–2020	Girlsway Originals	Yes	No	No	Director, 65 episodes
2020	Primary	Yes	Yes	No	Hired as television director for the project by producer Erika Lust.

== Awards and nominations ==
Year	Award	Category	Work	Result	Notes
2014	XRCO	Best New Starlet	—N/a	Nominated	
2014	AVN	Best All-Girl Group Sex Scene	Babysit My Ass 2 (shared with Joey Silvera/Evil Angel, Sarah Shevon, Gabriella Paltrova)	Nominated	
2014	AVN	Best Boy/Girl Sex Scene	Dark Perversions 2k (shared with Kelly Madison/Juicy; Casey Calvert & Ryan Madison)	Nominated	
2014	AVN	Best Girl/Girl Sex Scene	Teach Me 3 (shared with India Summer)	Nominated	
2014	AVN	Best New Starlet	—N/a	Nominated	
2014	AVN	Best Solo Sex Scene	Bound by Desire: A Leap of Faith	Nominated	
2014	AVN	Most Outrageous Sex Scene	Babysit My Ass 2, "The Purple Rose of Colon" (with Joey Silvera/Evil Angel; Sarah Shevon, Gabriella Paltrova)	Nominated	
2014	AVN	Most Outrageous Sex Scene	Homecoming, in "Hedwig and the Anal Itch" (with Ralph Long)	Nominated	
2015	AVN	Best Girl/Girl Sex Scene	Dirty Panties 2 (shared with Jada Stevens)	Nominated	
2015	AVN	Best Group Sex Scene	Nymphos (shared with Mischa Brooks, Juelz Ventura, Xander Corvus, Tommy Pistol and Michael Vegas)	Nominated	
2015	AVN	Best POV Sex Scene	POV Pervert 17 (shared with Tim Von Swine)	Nominated	
2015	AVN	Best Three-Way Sex Scene—G/G/B	Anal Inferno 3 (shared with Adrianna Luna and Mike Adriano)	Nominated	
2015	XBIZ	Best Actress—Couples-Themed Release	Proud Parents	Nominated	
2015	XBIZ	Best Scene—Non-Feature Release	James Deen's 7 Sins (shared with Dana DeArmond, Phoenix Marie and James Deen)	Nominated	
2015	XRCO	Unsung Siren	—N/a	Won	
2015	NightMoves	Best Butt	—N/a	Nominated	
2016	AVN	Best Double Penetration Sex Scene	Analized (shared with James Deen and Erik Everhard)	Nominated	
2016	AVN	Best Girl/Girl Sex Scene	Sisterly Love 2 (shared with Shyla Jennings)	Nominated	
2016	GameLink	Porn Star Madness Tournament Champion	—N/a	Won	
2016	XBIZ	Best Actress—All-Girl Release	Girlfriends	Nominated	
2016	XBIZ	Best Sex Scene—Vignette Release	My Hotwife Blindfolded (shared with Toni Ribas)	Nominated	
2016	XBIZ	Female Performer of the Year	—N/a	Nominated	
2016	XRCO	Unsung Siren	—N/a	Nominated	
2017	AVN	Best Group Sex Scene	Orgy Masters 8 (shared with Keisha Grey, Katrina Jade, Jojo Kiss, Goldie Rush, Lexington Steele, Prince Yahshua, and Rico Strong)	Won	
2018	XRCO	Unsung Siren	—N/a	Won	
2018	AVN	Best All-Girl Group Sex Scene	Girl Kush 2	Nominated	
2018	AVN	Best Anal Sex Scene	Psychotic Behavior	Nominated	
2019	XBIZ	Best Sex Scene — All-Girl	Beautiful Strangers	Nominated	
2019	Fleshbot	Female Performer of the Year	—N/a	Nominated	
2020	AVN	Best Director – Web Channel/Site	—N/a	Nominated	
2020	AVN	Best Gangbang Scene	Gangbanged Anal Cheaters	Nominated	
2020	AVN	Best Three-Way Sex Scene – G/G/B	Coming Home	Nominated	
2020	XBIZ	Best Non-Sex Performance	The Reunion	Nominated	
2021	AVN	Best Directing – Comedy	Cougar Queen: A Tiger King Parody	Won	
2021	XRCO	Best Director – Parody	—N/a	Won	
2023	XBIZ	Director of the Year – Feature	—N/a	Won	
2023	XBIZ	Best Screenplay	Going Up	Won	
2023	Fleshbot Award	Best Sex Scene-Translesbian	More	Won	
2024	XBIZ	Director of The Year – Individual Work	Primary 3	Won	
2024	XBIZ	Best Screenplay	Primary 3	Won	
2024	AVN	Best Screenplay – Movie or Limited Series	Primary 3	Won	
2024	AVN	Best Trans One-on-One Sex Scene	Muses: Kasey Kei	Won	
2025	XMA	Best Sex Scene – All-Girl	Come Out to Play: An All-Girl Warriors Parody	Won	
2025	AVN	Best Leading Actress	Birth	Won	
2025	XRCO	Best Actress	Birth	Won	
2025	DSN	Best International Director	Last Splash	Won	
2025	Bazowie Award	Fan Favorite Fandom Video	Come Out to Play: An All-Girl Warriors Parody	Won	
2026	XMA	Best Sex Scene - All-Girl	Come Out to Play: An All-Girl Warriors Parody	Won	
2026	XMA	Best Sex Scene - Orgy/Group (Mixed)	The Bottom Floor: Second Coming	Won	
2026	DSN	Best International Director	Connection	Won	

== See also ==
- 31st AVN Awards
- 32nd AVN Awards
- 34th AVN Awards
- 35th AVN Awards
- List of BDSM authors
- List of pornographic film directors
- List of pornographic performers by decade
- List of University of Florida alumni
