= Atherton Hall =

Atherton Hall may refer to:

- Atherton Hall, Leigh, in Leigh, Wigan, Greater Manchester, England.
- Atherton Hall (Penn State), a Pennsylvania State University dormitory
