= MiKandi =

Adult software distribution platform

- Developer: MiKandi
- Release: November 29, 2009
- Stable release: 5.5.10 / March 10, 2018; 8 years ago
- Written in: Java
- Operating system: Android
- Size: 13.1 MB
- Available in: English, German, Spanish, Chinese
- Type: Software store
- Website: mikandi.com

MiKandi (pronounced "my candy") is a defunct mobile adult software applications store. Developed by MiKandi LLC, a formerly Seattle-based company, MiKandi was the world's first mobile porn app store. The store sought to get around restrictions placed on adult content by Apple Inc. by releasing the third-party application store on Google's Android open-source operating system and offering an HTML5 web-based application for all touch devices.

On December 9, 2009, MiKandi reported that the client software had been downloaded over 80,000 times onto Android devices since their November 29, 2009 launch. By 2012, the MiKandi application had been installed on 2 million devices. The native MiKandi application is only available for the Android operating system, but in 2012, the company released an HTML5-based application to stream adult entertainment videos to all touch devices. MiKandi applications are aimed at an adult demographic and contain explicit adult content.

As of mid-2013, MiKandi had been installed on 3.8 million Android devices and had a catalog of exactly 7,437 adult applications. In June 2013, the app launched on the Google Glass app store and was immediately banned.

== Applications ==
In an interview with Northwest Cable News, Jennifer McEwen, a co-founder of MiKandi, noted that all applications would be accepted as long as they were legal. Although MiKandi has the potential to have high quality adult applications, many early applications have been criticized as simply packages of pictures and short videos. Since their launch, prominent adult brands have launched official uncensored applications in the app market. On November 23, 2010, Gamelink, a subsidiary of Private Media Group, launched its official application in the MiKandi App Market. Early adopter, Pink Visual, launched their first application in March 2010, followed by a second application, iTouch Her, in January 2011. Online sex and swinger personals community website Adult FriendFinder also released an official application in the market in February 2011. On March 24, 2011, the controversial application iBoobs was released in the MiKandi App Market. Banned from the Apple App Store in 2008, the full uncensored application was briefly distributed in the Android Market before it was removed in 2011. Although, the free censored version of the app is still available in the Android Market, the developers of the application reported that AdMob had stopped serving ads to the ad-supported application. In 2012, Hustler joined MiKandi and released two official Hustler applications in the adult app market.

== Features and services ==
=== MiKandi App Store ===
The MiKandi App Store is a third-party Android application and is available on Android devices worldwide. It is the first and largest adult app store for mobile devices. MiKandi apps were formerly free, but premium features and apps are now available.

=== MiKandi Gold ===
MiKandi launched a number of updates to the app store in 2010. The most notable update was on Thanksgiving Day 2010, in which the app store released a complete design overhaul and introduced paid app support using the app market's own virtual currency, MiKandi Gold. During this time, MiKandi released a glimpse at a new product called MiKandi Theater which can be accessed in the app market. The new design also indicates that the app market will allow customers to earn virtual currency by completing an offer wall.

=== KandiBilling, in-app billing system ===
On March 28, 2011, MiKandi released full in-app billing support, dubbed KandiBilling, to Android developers.

=== MiKandi Theater ===
One year after releasing KandiBilling, MiKandi launched a major product update to MiKandi Theater. The company collaborated with adult studios Elegant Angel, Wasteland, Gamma Entertainment, Pink TV, Burning Angel, and Cocky Boys to stream hundreds of adult entertainment video clips to MiKandi's Android users. Less than 2 months later, the company released an HTML5 version of MiKandi Theater to support all non-Android touch devices. MiKandi announced at that time that its user base had grown to 2 million.

== Controversy ==
During a 2010 iPhone 4.0 OS event, Apple CEO Steve Jobs noted that a “porn store” existed on Android—referring to MiKandi without using its name, and the app market was downloaded approximately 10,000 times in 12 hours after Jobs’ statement. MiKandi received a cease-and-desist request from Apple in March 2011 for the market's use of the term ‘app store’. MiKandi has since changed all terms on its websites and mobile client to read ‘app market’ and now bills itself as “The World’s First App Market for Adults.” Co-founder and CEO Jesse Adams suggests that the company may support Microsoft’s challenge to Apple’s trademark. Says Adams, “It’s not worth it for us to fight Apple’s legal team over this by ourselves. Maybe we can file an amicus brief to Microsoft’s case.”
