= Pink Visual =

American pornography film production company

- Industry: Pornography
- Founded: June 2004; 22 years ago
- Headquarters: Van Nuys, California, U.S.
- Products: Pornographic films
- Website: www.pinkvisual.com

Pink Visual was an independent reality and gonzo pornography film production company, based in Van Nuys, California, United States. It began as an Internet pornography provider before eventually moving into DVD production. Pink Visual also licensed adult content to cable, satellite, pay-per-view, hotel chain channels, and other Internet content licensees. They marketed their content with the tagline of "Raw. Raunchy. Real.", Pink Visual content was largely reality-based, taking inspiration from reality television. Pink Visual's porn productions typically utilized amateur performers and were shot in a 'Pro-am' style, utilizing digital video, including the high definition format.

== History ==
Founded in June 2004, Pink Visual evolved out of the formerly established TopBucks webmaster affiliate program, which gave Pink Visual the content and marketing resources to launch into the DVD market.

On February 4, 2009, Pink Visual offered a $10 discount on selected sites in "compensation for (the) Super Bowl porn mishap" in which Tucson, AZ area Comcast customers had their service interrupted for 30 seconds by an uncensored Pink Visual video.

The last DVD released by the company was in 2015. The company apparently closed its online site Aug. 15, 2023.

== iPinkVisual ==
In 2008, Pink Visual launched iPinkVisual.com and iPinkVisualPass.com, the first major U.S.-based mobile porn websites designed especially for iPhones.

In June 2009, Pink Visual tweaked the mobile compatibility of their sites to include functionality with other WebKit based browsers, including the Palm Pre and mobile devices running on Google Android. Pink Visual mobile porn sports a limited functionality with certain BlackBerry devices. Pink Visual has released an app on the MiKandi app store for Android.

== PinkVisualPad ==
In April 2010, Pink Visual launched PinkVisualPad.com, the first major porn website designed especially for the newly released iPad. This release was followed soon after by the release of MaleSpectrumPad.com, the first gay website designed for iPad compatibility.

== Male Spectrum ==
In December 2008, Pink Visual premiered Male Spectrum, a new line of gay pornography home video titles focusing on premium, high-quality gay reality porn content. In addition to the DVD line, Male Spectrum has also launched two gay mobile sites compatible with the iPhone and other multimedia capable mobile devices, iMaleSpectrum.com and iMaleSpectrumPass.com. Recently, Male Spectrum made an initial donation of $2500 to the Human Rights Campaign to assist in the HRC's fight against discrimination.

== PVLocker ==
Pink Visual launched PVLocker.com in March 2011 as a way to fulfill the evolving consumer demands for adult content that was affordable and accessible from multiple devices from mobile phones, to tablets, to PCs. PVLocker allows customers to purchase just the scenes that they want and access them forever from within their locker. Additionally, PVLocker has an upload feature where customers can store already purchased adult content from other sources and access the content from multiple devices. PVLocker.com allows consumers to hide or store their porn off their local computers and in the cloud.

PVLocker.com also aggregates adult content from various XXX studios including: Private Media, Holly Randall, Acid Rain, Grind House, Wasteland, Juicy Pink Box, and Sssh.

== Pink Visual Apocalypse Bunker ==
In September 2011, Pink Visual announced that in preparation for the 2012 apocalypse predicted by the Mayan calendar, they are building a massive underground bunker. The bunker will contain all of the obvious emergency supplies and facilities as well as a few amenities. The bunker will have multiple fully stocked bars, an enormous performing stage with a rotating hydraulic platform and a sophisticated content production studio. The apocalypse bunker was scheduled to be ready by September 2012 and preliminary blueprints have been released.

== Green initiative ==
In March 2009, Pink Visual and Male Spectrum have made news by donating a portion of their proceeds to Trees for the Future as well as for releasing an environmentally friendly DVD line, Plant Your Wood. The company is also working to turn their web sites carbon neutral.

== Conan the Boobarian ==
On January 18, 2010, Conan O'Brien revealed that he was offered to star in a Pink Visual porno entitled "Conan the Boobarian" among other job offers following his high-profile exit from The Tonight Show.

== Anti-Piracy Efforts ==
Pink Visual’s Anti-Piracy strategy is directed by its General Counsel, Jessica Pena. Pena joined the company in 2008 and immediately recognized the widespread effect of online piracy both for Pink Visual and the adult entertainment industry as a whole. Pena began using litigation strategies to combat online copyright infringement focusing not only on the recovery of damages, but the use of technology to prevent future infringement. Pena’s approach has evolved to incorporate site operator litigation, legal pressure, end-user education, content removal services and the development of reasonable alternatives to piracy. “In some ways, the mainstream entertainment space is way ahead of the adult sector in terms of how it fights piracy.” Pena states, “Having said that, there are some interesting anti-piracy approaches that adult rights-holders are taking, so my goal is to encourage the minds from both sectors to come together and share ideas that will create even more effective strategies.”

In February 2010, Pink Visual’s holding company Ventura Content, Ltd. filed suit in the U.S. District Court for New York against Mansef, Inc. the owners of Brazzers, alleging that four company-owned tube sites infringed on 45 copyrighted movies. The suit was settled in October 2010, with terms that remain confidential, other than an agreement between the parties that the site operators would implement digital fingerprint filtering on their sites.

In December 2010, Pink Visual filed suit against the operators of SlutLoad.com, alleging infringement on 53 Pink Visual works. The suit was settled in March, 2011, and once again included an agreement that the defendant would implement digital fingerprint filtering.

In July 2011, Pink Visual filed suit against Motherless.com, alleging copyright infringement in connection with 19 Pink Visual works, as well as unfair competition for its failure to abide by the adult industries’ age verification and record keeping requirements. Motherless won the case, with the judge ruling they were entitled to the DMCA's safe-harbor provisions. Pink Visual's appeal was thrown out in 2018.

In September 2011, Pink Visual filed suit against Two Point Oh Ltd., which operates multiple popular adult sites, alleging infringement on 92 Pink Visual works. The suit was settled in December, 2011 under confidential terms. However, the parties entered into a consent judgment whereby Two Point Oh recognizes that digital fingerprint filtering is a reasonable technical measure to prevent online copyright infringement in the adult arena.

In addition to the litigation the company has undertaken to combat copyright infringement, Pink Visual has also organized and hosted two Content Protection Retreats, (CPR) in order to provide information to other adult studios on copyright law and engage in discussions regarding industry strategies, as a whole, to combat piracy. The first CPR took place in October 2010, in Tucson, Arizona. A second CPR was held in February, 2011 in Hollywood California. Dozens of adult entertainment studios participated in the events, hearing presentations from intellectual property attorneys, companies that provide content take-down services and other experts in copyright enforcement and anti-piracy strategy.

Pink Visual cites a clear anti-piracy policy to their consumers and looks to educate end-users about the dangers and risks of piracy. Pink Visual content is prohibited from being distributed on torrents and Cyberlocker sites. Pink Visual recommends that consumers purchase legally and provides numerous methods for consumers to access their content legally. Illegal downloads of PinkVisual content are prohibited and considered copyright infringement.

In 2012, Pink Visual established an anti-piracy service of its own that performs online copyright infringement location, trademark monitoring, copyright registration and DMCA takedown notice services for rights-holders.

== Awards ==
- 2006: 7 AVN Award nominations
- 2006: Won AVN Award in 'Best Specialty Release – MILF' category for Milf Seeker
- 2007: 17 AVN Award nominations including nominations for Best Marketing Campaign – Overall, and Best Marketing Campaign – Online
- 2007: Won AVN Award in 'Best Specialty Series – MILF' category for Milf Seeker
- 2008: 15 AVN Award nominations
- 2008: Won AVN Award in 'Best Solo Release' category for Extreme Holly Goes Solo
- Won AVN Awards for two consecutive years in Best Specialty Series – MILF category
- 2009: 20 AVN Award nominations
- 2010: 16 AVN Award nominations
- 2011: 18 AVN Award nominations including nominations for Best Membership Site - PinkVisualPass.com and Best Membership Site Network - PinkVisual.com
- 2011: Won Future Mobile Award for Mobile Adult from Juniper Research
- 2012: 7 AVN Award nominations including nominations for Best Affiliate program: TopBucks Mobile and Best Studio website: pinkvisual.com
- 2013: XBIZ Award Nominations - 'All-Sex Release of the Year' for It's Her Fantasy, 'Vignette Series of the Year' for Wife Switch, 'All-Girl Series of the Year' for Her First Lesbian Sex
