= William Schreyer =

American business executive (1928–2011)

William A. Schreyer
- Born: January 13, 1928; Williamsport, Pennsylvania, United States
- Died: January 22, 2011 (aged 83); Princeton, New Jersey
- Education: Pennsylvania State University
- Occupations: Financial services executive, philanthropist
- Spouse: Joan Legg

William Allen Schreyer (January 13, 1928 – January 22, 2011) was an American business executive who served as a chairman emeritus and CEO of Merrill Lynch & Co.. He was also a philanthropist and served as former president of Pennsylvania State University's Board of Trustees.

== Early life and education ==
William A. Schreyer was born in Williamsport, Pennsylvania, on January 13, 1928. His father managed the local office of a stock brokerage that was later acquired by Merrill Lynch. As a high school student, Schreyer worked there part-time, tasked with writing the day’s stock prices on a chalkboard. Schreyer then attended Penn State, where he joined the Sigma Phi Epsilon fraternity. He graduated in 1948 with a degree in commerce and finance. Although he was accepted by Harvard Business School to matriculate in fall 1949, he decided instead to enroll in a new Merrill Lynch internship.

== Career ==
Schreyer worked as a junior executive trainee at Merrill Lynch in Buffalo, New York, where he also met his wife Joan (née Legg). In the early 1950s he spent two years on active duty as a lieutenant in the U.S. Air Force stationed in Germany in order to fulfill his Reserve Officers' Training Corps (ROTC) obligations; this experience is purportedly when his interest in international financial markets began to emerge. He became the head of the Trenton, New Jersey office in 1963, eventually becoming the New York metropolitan regional director in 1972. He was appointed the head of Merrill Lynch Government Securities in 1973.

In 1982, Schreyer was appointed President of the firm. In 1985, in an unexpected management shake‑up due to a $42 million loss in the last quarter of 1983, he rose to Chairman, and then CEO, as the incumbent Roger E. Birk stepped down. As chief executive, Schreyer "reshaped the company and improved its profitability by slimming down some of its retail operations and building up its investment banking business".

He led a high-level team called the "Schreyer Working Team" whose goal was to diagnose what was wrong at Merrill; it discovered that although the bank was "bringing in more and more revenue each year", because costs were increasing at the same rate, the net impact on revenue was not positive. Unexpected costs associated with the new corporate headquarters in the World Financial Center imposed further financial burdens. The company endured further hardships in 1987 as Black Monday coincided with the company's $377 million loss on mortgage-backed securities in 1987.

Bill Schreyer responded to these financial hardships with a cost-restructuring effort that he called "Merristroika", a portmanteau of "Merrill" and "perestroika". First, he sold the sprawling real estate services division, which was located entirely in the United States; Schreyer considered international securities, with large presences in London and Tokyo, as well as in New York and around the United States, to be the future of Merrill Lynch. Indeed, Schreyer's restructuring set the foundation for Merrill's admission to the Tokyo Stock Exchange, one of the first foreign firms to do so. Furthermore, it became the first American investment bank to open a representative office in China.

== Philanthropy ==
In 1997, he and his wife Joan (née Legg) endowed the Schreyer Honors College at Pennsylvania State University (whence he graduated, class of 1948) with a gift of $30 million. The honors college was created in 1980 as the University Scholars Program. On November 17, 2006, the Schreyers pledged an additional gift of $25 million to the Schreyer Honors College. Having contributed more than $58 million to Penn State, they are the largest family donors in the school's history.

In March 2007, Schreyer and his wife gifted $5 million toward Princeton HealthCare System's proposed Plainsboro Hospital to fund a state-of-the-art community and professional education center.

In August 2007, Schreyer donated $5 million to the education foundation of the Sigma Phi Epsilon fraternity, of which he is an alumnus.

William A. Schreyer died on the morning of January 22, 2011, after battling an undisclosed illness for some time. He is survived by his wife, his daughter DrueAnne Schreyer, his son-in-law Rodney Frazier, and two grandchildren.

== Publications ==
Schreyer published a memoir in 2009, in which he said he continued to be an optimist, despite what had happened:

- Schreyer, William A. (2009). Still Bullish on America: A Memoir. William A. Schreyer. p. 322. ISBN 978-0615298160.
