= Motherless (website) =

Defunct pornographic website

- Website type: Pornographic video sharing
- Available in: English
- Founded: 2008; 18 years ago
- Headquarters: Netherlands
- Country of origin: United States
- Area served: Worldwide
- Owner: Joshua G. Lange
- Services: Pornography
- Website: motherless.com; motherless.xxx
- Registration: Optional
- Current status: Offline

Motherless was a pornographic image and video-sharing website. The site was taken down several times starting May 2026 and has been offline since July 2026 due to the Dutch police's seizure of the hosting server.

== Ownership ==
The website domain name was first purchased in 2005. The website and company were founded in 2008 by Joshua G. Lange in New York City. Lange owns several other companies, including DuloTech Inc. and real estate holdings, in a limited liability company.

== Legal cases ==
In July 2011, Pink Visual filed suit against Motherless, alleging copyright infringement and unfair competition regarding record keeping requirements. Motherless won the case under the safe harbor provisions of the Digital Millennium Copyright Act (DMCA).

Following the 2012 suicide of Canadian teenager Amanda Todd, the site was named in the Supreme Court of British Columbia during the 2022 trial of Dutch national Aydin Coban, who faced charges of extortion, possession and distribution of child pornography, communicating with intent to lure a child, and criminal harassment. He had uploaded topless pictures of Todd to the site. He was eventually found guilty of all charges and sentenced to 13 years in prison; he was already serving an 11-year sentence in the Netherlands for similar offending.

In 2025, UK regulator Ofcom began investigating the website's parent company Kick Online Entertainment S.A. under the Online Safety Act 2023 (OSA), after receiving complaints about the presence of child sexual abuse material and "extreme pornography" on Motherless. In February 2026, Ofcom fined Kick Online Entertainment £800,000 (US$1.1 million) for failing to implement age verification under OSA.

In March 2026, CNN reported that the site was part of a broader online ecosystem of pornographic content purporting to show women asleep or sedated. According to CNN, the legality of some of this material was doubtful. Following publication, some social media users falsely claimed that CNN had reported on an "online rape academy" where more than 62 million men had been taught to drug and assault their partners. However, 62 million was the total number of visits the site had received in a single month across all video categories, and the "academy" was a Telegram group to which a Motherless user had posted a link.

On May 8, 2026, CNN reported that the site, whose servers are based in the Netherlands, had been taken down by Dutch authorities after facing public pressure due to the earlier investigation, although the homepage stated the site had been taken down voluntarily. The site was restored a few days later. In June 2026, a Texas court directed the domain name registry Verisign to suspend the domain motherless.com for violating Texas's age verification law.

On July 21, 2026, the cybercrime team of the Zeeland-West Brabant police searched a hosting provider at locations in Steenbergen, Rotterdam, and Amsterdam, and seized servers owned or used by Motherless. The searches formed part of an international investigation led by the Dutch Public Prosecution Service into suspected criminal material hosted on the website, including child sexual abuse material and footage suspected of depicting women being sexually assaulted after being drugged. Authorities stated that the seized data would be examined with assistance from Europol and that investigators would examine both those responsible for uploading the material and the possible role of Motherless itself. No arrests were made during the searches.

== See also ==
- Is Anyone Up?
