= Clay Calvert =

American lawyer and academic

Clay Calvert is an American legal scholar. He is a nonresident senior fellow at the American Enterprise Institute and professor emeritus, Brechner Eminent Scholar of Mass Communication Emeritus and former Director of the Marion B. Brechner First Amendment Project in the University of Florida College of Journalism and Communications, specializing in First Amendment Law. He was previously a professor at the Pennsylvania State University where he co-directed the Pennsylvania Center for the First Amendment. A member of the California State Bar Association, he has authored or co-authored more than 150 scholarly articles for law journals. He has also written several books dealing with the First Amendment.

He earned an undergraduate degree from Stanford University, followed by a Juris Doctor degree from the University of the Pacific's McGeorge School of Law, and culminating in a Ph.D. from Stanford.

== Other faculty positions ==
- Professor, Fredric G. Levin College of Law (2020–2022)
- Visiting professor, McGeorge School of Law, University of the Pacific (Spring 2011)
- Interim Dean, Schreyer Honors College (2005–2006)
- Associate Dean, Schreyer Honors College (2002–2003)

== Education ==
- University of the Pacific, J.D.
- Stanford University, Ph.D., Communication
- Stanford University, B.A., Communication
