= Schreyer Honors College =

College Honors Program

Coordinates: 40.79771°N 77.85815°W

- Type: Public
- Established: 1980
- Dean: Patrick T. Mather
- Undergraduates: 2000
- Location: University Park, Pennsylvania, United States
- Campus: University Park (Primarily)
- Website: www.shc.psu.edu

The Scholars Medal awarded to graduating Scholars during the Schreyer Honors College's Medals Ceremony, traditionally held on the eve of Penn State's commencement exercises.

The Schreyer Honors College (or SHC) is the honors program of the Pennsylvania State University. Founded in 1980 as the University Scholars Program, it was expanded and renamed in 1997 in response to a $30 million gift by William and Joan Schreyer. Schreyer was one of three honors colleges, along with those at Arizona State and Mississippi, to be listed by Reader's Digest in its "America's 100 Best" list published in May, 2005. On November 17, 2006, the Schreyers pledged an additional gift of $25 million to the Schreyer Honors College. Having contributed more than $58 million to Penn State, they were the largest family donors in the school's history, prior to the recent donation of $88 million from Terry and Kim Pegula for a new arena.

After a decade of service, Dean Christian Brady announced in May 2016 that he was stepping down, effective May 31. Kathleen J. Bieschke was named interim dean on May 25, 2016.

Patrick Mather became the dean on August 16, 2021.

== Overview ==
Details regarding the Schreyer Honors College can be found in their Annual Report.

Enrollment in the Schreyer Honors College is typically around 2,000 students, with 300 incoming students per year. Typically, about 80% of the Honors students are from Pennsylvania.

Incoming student application requirements include excellent high school grades, strong extracurricular activities, and positive teacher references. The average high school GPA is typically 4.00/4.00. Typically, the average SAT score for incoming students is 1480/1600 although SAT scores are not used in the admissions decision process at the Honors College.

First year students admitted to the Honors College earn a $5,000-per-year academic scholarship which is renewable for four years.

Current Penn State students with strong academic and volunteer credentials can apply to the Honors College as sophomores or juniors. These students are not eligible for the $5,000-per-year academic scholarship.

To graduate as a Schreyer Scholar, students in the Honors College are required to maintain a 3.4 GPA, take a selection of Honors classes and complete an Honors Senior Thesis.

== Opportunities ==
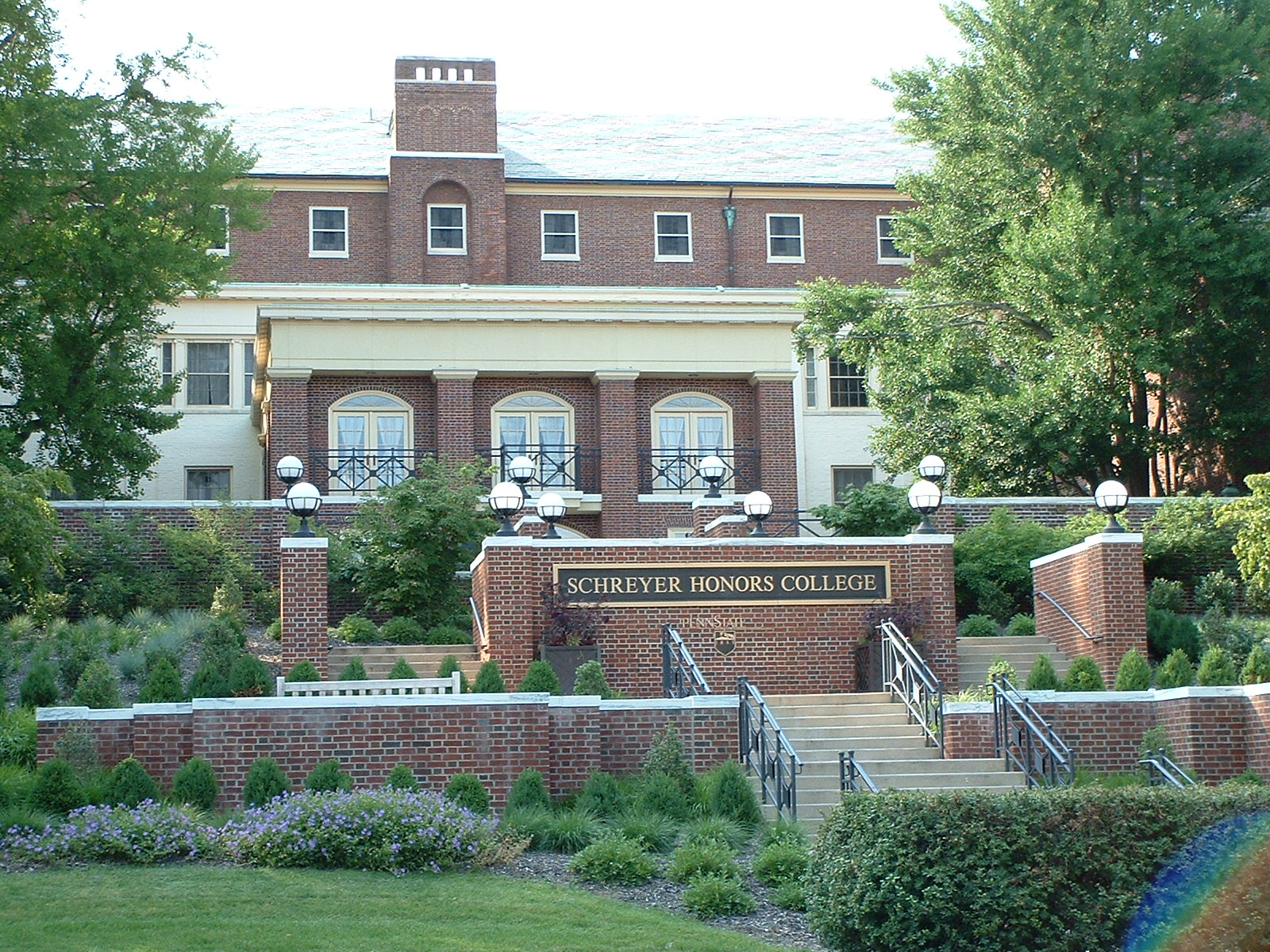
Main entrance of Atherton Hall, the location of the administrative offices of the Schreyer Honors College, as seen from College Av., at Penn State University, University Park, Pennsylvania.

Membership in the SHC has unique benefits. Most underclassmen Scholars live in a "Living and Learning Community" honors dormitories, including both Atherton Hall and Simmons Hall. The College's Travel Ambassador program provides funding for honors student travel around the world, with gifts often matching the cost of airfare for longer trips with a service or academic focus. Academically, honors students have the benefit of early registration for classes, allowing for competitive placement. Students are offered over 220 honors classes, which are typically smaller and taught by more senior faculty than comparable courses. Additionally, the college offers an opportunity called the Integrated Undergraduate Graduate (IUG) program, which allows exceptional students to pursue their undergraduate and master's degrees concurrently. The IUG program permits students to combine the required honors thesis and graduate thesis into a single thesis for both undergraduate and graduate degrees, as well as allowing students to use some courses towards both degrees in order to graduate in a shorter period of time.
