= List of Pennsylvania State University residence halls =

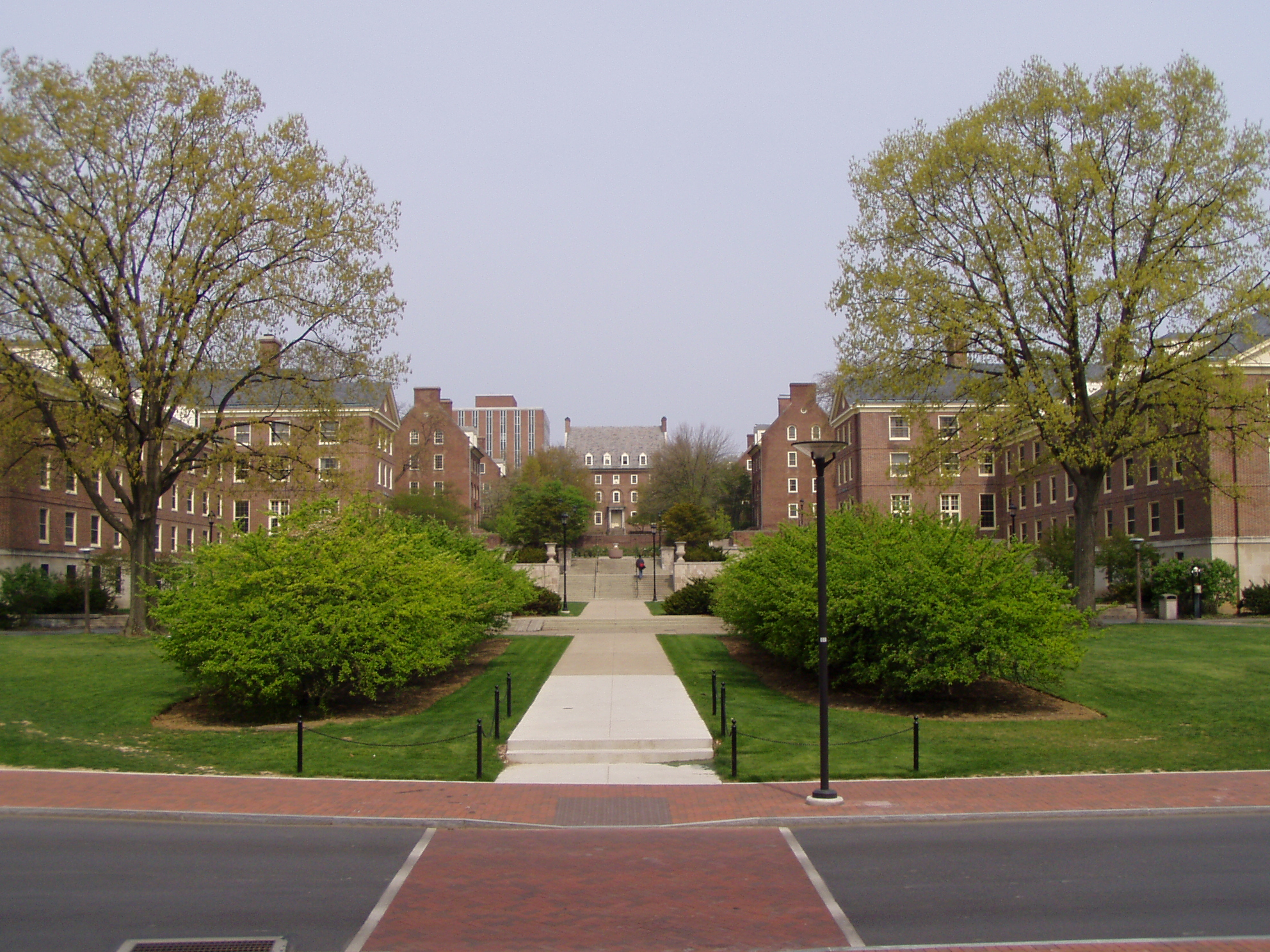
West Halls residential complex at Penn State University Park

The following is a list of the residence halls within the Pennsylvania State University system.

== University Park ==
In addition to the following residence halls, the University Park campus provides housing in Eastview Terrace, White Course Apartments, and Nittany Apartments.

=== Residence Commons ===
The residence commons are common areas for each of the residence hall areas. Each one has a dining hall and a computer lab. At one point in time, each had a radio station. WEHR (East Halls Radio), which operated in Johnston Commons until 2005, was the last to survive.

- Waring Commons (West Halls)
- Warnock Commons (North Halls)
- Redifer Commons (South Halls)
- Findlay/Johnston Commons (East Halls)
- Pollock Commons (Pollock Halls)

=== Other resource areas ===
- Nittany Community Center (Nittany)

Houses a TV lounge, laundry facilities, Commons Desk, Residence Life/Housing Office for residents of Nittany Apartments and Suites.

- Weston Community Center (White Course)

Houses a TV lounge, Commons Desk, Residence Life/Housing Office for residents of White Course Apartments.

- Brill Hall (Eastview Terrace)

Houses a TV lounge, Front Desk, Residence Life/Housing Office for residents of Eastview Terrace.

=== East Halls ===
East Halls is the largest group of residence halls on campus, and is served by Findlay/Johnston Commons. It is reserved primarily for first-year student housing, and most residents share a double room with a roommate. The area's special living options are First-Year Interest in Liberal Arts and Education and Tri-Service ROTC. All of the buildings in the East Halls residence area are named after former governors of Pennsylvania. All of the halls and commons within East Halls are connected via an underground maintenance tunnel system (entrance doors locked). The residence halls are:

- Bigler
- Brumbaugh
- Curtin
- Earle
- Fisher
- Geary
- Hastings
- Martin
- McKean
- Packer
- Pennypacker
- Pinchot
- Snyder
- Sproul
- Stone
- Stuart
- Tener

=== North Halls ===
North Halls is the smallest residence hall complex at the University Park campus, consisting of five residence halls. They are known as the most comfortable on campus, with all rooms being carpeted and having their own bathroom. Nearly all rooms in North residence halls are suites for two or four students, however there are a few rooms for only a single resident. The two- and four-person suites are made up of four rooms with two bedrooms with a shared living room separating them, and the bathroom connected to the shared living room.

Leete was the first hall converted to this format. North Halls special living options are Arts and Architecture (A&A), Business and Society House (BASH), and EARTH House.

- Beam
- Holmes
- Leete
- Runkle
- Robinson
  - This building was once converted to offices for the Business Administration department, and more recently the Dickinson School of Law. The structure of Beam is identical to the other North Halls residence halls. It was reopened as of the Fall 2009 semester.

=== Pollock Halls ===
Pollock Halls is the third-largest residence hall complex on campus, consisting of co-ed and female only residence halls. Most rooms are shared by two students. Pollock Halls houses nine special livings options: Be House (Be-Engaged as of August 2013), Discover House, EASI (Engineering and Applied Sciences), Forensic Science Interest House, HEAL (Health Education and Awareness in Living), HAC (Helping Across the Community), ILH (International Languages), LIFE (Living in a Free Environment as of August 2013), and WISE (Women in Science and Engineering).

- Beaver - Co-ed Hall with several Special Living Options
- Hartranft - Co-ed First Year Hall
- Hiester - Co-ed Upperclassman Hall
- Mifflin - Co-ed First Year Hall
- Porter - Co-ed First Year Hall
- Ritner - Co-ed First Year Hall
- Shulze - Co-Ed Upperclassman Hall
- Shunk - Co-ed First Year Hall
- Wolf - Co-ed First Year Hall

=== South Halls and South Proper ===
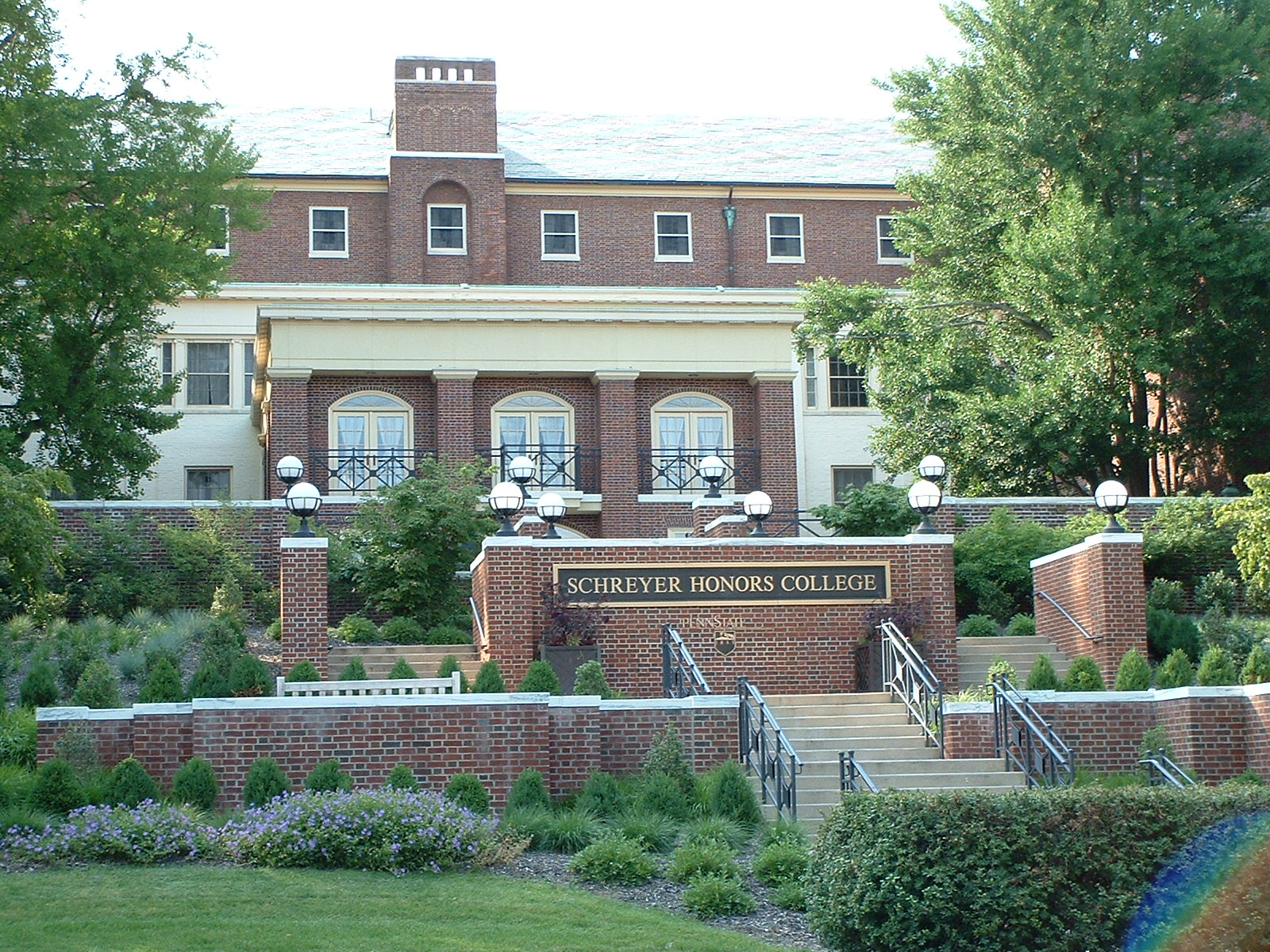
Atherton Hall

South Halls offers housing for Schreyer Honors College students in Atherton and Simmons, and in addition offers male, female and co-ed residence halls. At one point both McElwain Hall and Simmons Hall both contained a dining complex, but as of May 2011 their dining areas were eliminated to increase residential room space. South Halls also contains housing for sororities.

- Atherton (newly remodeled restrooms as of August 2013, adopting a "wet core" restroom concept).
- Simmons
- McElwain
- Eastview Terrace (for more information on Eastview Terrace, scroll down)
- Nittany Apartments (for more information on Nittany Apartments, scroll down)

=== South Proper ===
- Chace (is a brand new residence hall facility with A/C and kitchenette and opened its doors in August 2013. Also includes a "wet core" restroom concept)

These two buildings are connected to each other:

- Haller (newly remodeled with A/C and kitchenettes as of August 2013. Also includes a "wet core" restroom concept)
- Lyons (newly remodeled with A/C and kitchenettes as of August 2013. Also includes a "wet core" restroom concept)

These two buildings are connected to each other:

- Cross (newly remodeled with A/C and kitchenettes as of January 2014. Also includes a "wet core" restroom concept)
- Ewing (newly remodeled with A/C and kitchenettes as of January 2014. Also includes a "wet core" restroom concept)

These two buildings are connected to each other:

- Cooper (will be newly remodeled with A/C and kitchenettes as of August 2014. Will include a "wet core" restroom concept)
- Hoyt (will be newly remodeled with A/C and kitchenettes as of August 2014. Will include a "wet core" restroom concept)

These two buildings are connected to each other:

- Stephens (will be newly remodeled with A/C and kitchenettes as of January 2015. Will include a "wet core" restroom concept)
- Hibbs with Alpha Delta Pi and Alpha Chi Omega Sororities (will be newly remodeled with A/C and kitchenettes as of January 2015. Will include a "wet core" restroom concept)

*A Wet Core restroom concept eliminates the need to have "gender specific" restrooms in that there is a common sink space that everyone shares with every toilet/shower in a separate room behind a locked door. The wet core concept eliminates the traditional restroom design and allows for more privacy for any student without having to worry about gender obstacles.

=== Nittany Apartments and Suites ===
Nittany Apartments and Suites provide the luxury of apartment and suite living while allowing students to still live on campus. Nittany Apartments houses same-sex students in either two-bedroom or four-bedroom apartments, complete with bathroom, living room, and kitchen. Nittany Suites—made up exclusively of Nittany Hall—houses single upperclass students in two-bedroom suites. Four people live in each suite. These living areas are available to upperclass students.

=== Eastview Terrace ===
Eastview Terrace is a residence location specifically for sophomores, juniors, and seniors. It houses 806 undergraduates, providing a private bedroom and bath for each student. Its location, east of South Halls, is perfect for an atmosphere that feels as though it off campus while remaining on campus. Additional charges do apply to Eastview Terrace rooms.

- Brill
- Curry
- Harris
- Miller
- Nelson
- Panofsky
- Young

=== West Halls ===
West Halls offers male, female, and co-ed housing in single, regular double, small double, and triple rooms. West Halls also includes the oldest residence halls on campus that are still in use. Several special living options are offered in West Halls, including EMS (Earth and Mineral Sciences), IST Interest House, (LGBT) Ally House, and E-House (Engineering House).

- Hamilton
- Irvin (EMS)( and once was home to the Penn State football players)
- Jordan
- McKee (E-House)
- Thompson (IST Interest House)
- Watts (Ally House)

=== White Course Apartments ===
White Course Apartments has previously only been available to full-time graduate students. As of Fall 2008 the area is open to undergraduates. The area provides housing for single graduate students, as well as graduate students in relationships and with families. The area provides one-, two-, and three-bedroom apartments, as well as townhouses.

- Bernreuter
- Cunningham
- Donkin
- Dunham
- Farrell
- Ferguson
- Garban
- Grubb
- Haffner
- Holderman
- Ikenberry
- Lovejoy
- Osborn
- Palladino
- Patterson
- Ray

== Commonwealth campuses ==
This is a list of student housing available on the Penn State Commonwealth campuses.

=== Abington ===
- Lions Gate

=== Altoona ===
- Cedar Hall
- Oak Hall
- Maple Hall
- Spruce Hall

=== Beaver ===
- Harmony Hall

=== Berks ===
The village

- Sage Hall
- Cedar Hall
- Sweetwood Hall
- Oakmoss Hall
- Laurel Hall
- Greenbriar Hall

The Woods

- Amber Hall
- Evergreen Hall
- Ivy Hall
- Juniper Hall
- Pepperwood Hall
- Poplar Hall
- Willow Hall

=== Brandywine ===
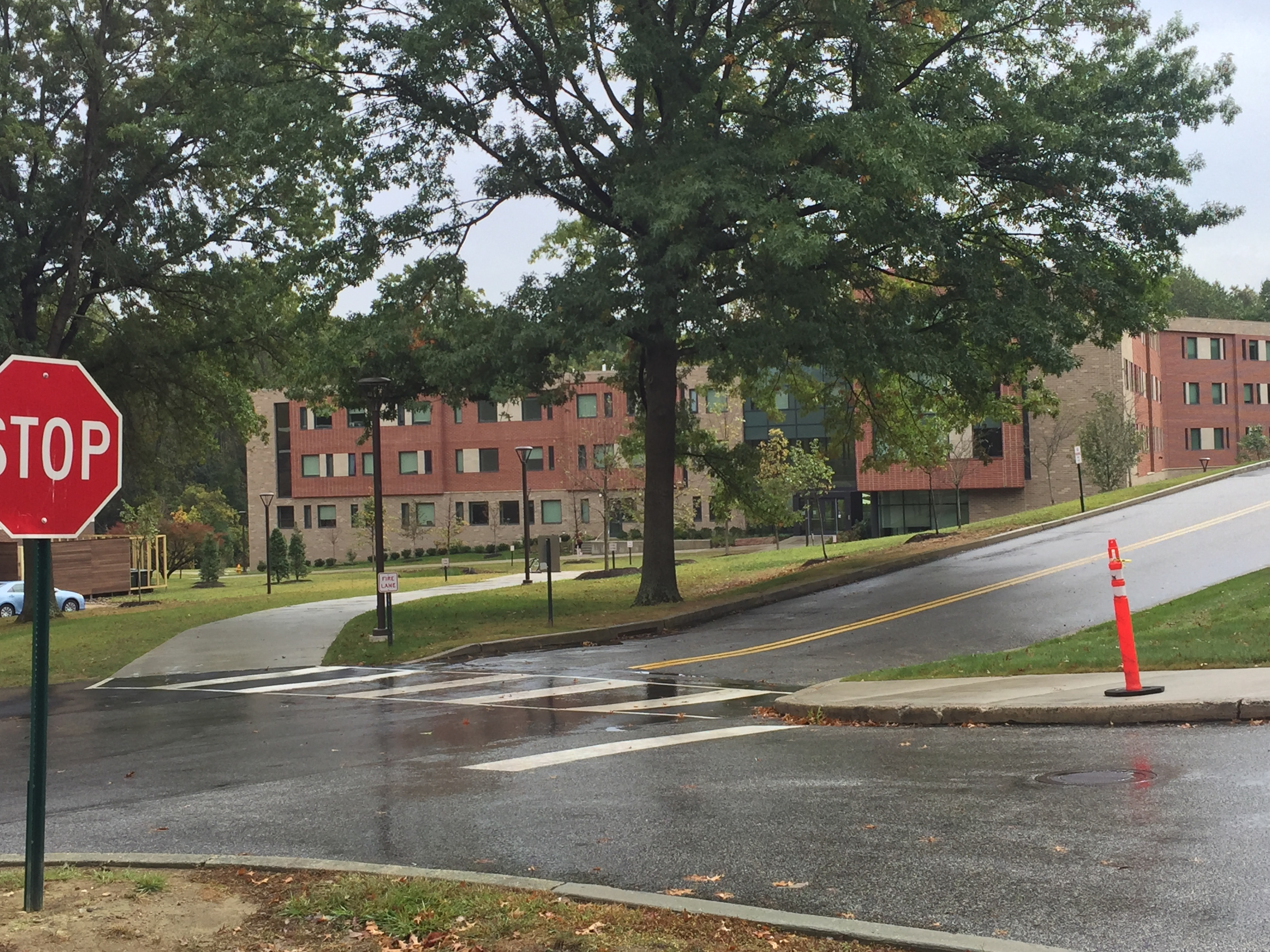
Brandywine Campus Orchard Hall student dormitory at Penn State Brandywine

- Orchard Hall

=== Erie, The Behrend College ===
- Almy Hall
- Lawrence Hall
- Niagara Hall
- Ohio Hall
- Perry Hall
- Porcupine Hall
- Senat Hall
- Tiffany Hall
- Tigress Hall
- Behrend Apartments

=== Harrisburg ===
- The Village at Capital College Apartment Complex

1000
2000
3000
4000
5000
6000
7000
8000
9000

=== Hazleton ===
- North Hall
- South Hall
- West Hall

=== Greater Allegheny ===
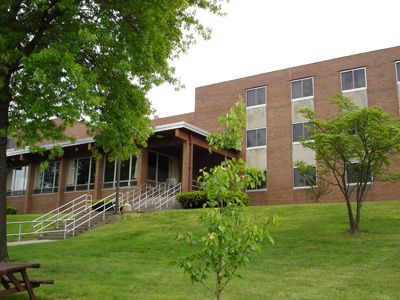
McKeesport Hall at Penn State Greater Allegheny, constructed in 1969

- McKeesport Hall

=== Mont Alto ===
- Mont Alto Hall
- Penn Gate I
- Penn Gate II

=== Schuylkill ===
- Nittany I
- Nittany II
- Nittany III
- Nittany IV
- Nittany V
