= Bree Mills =

American director, screenwriter and producer of pornographic films (born 1981/82)

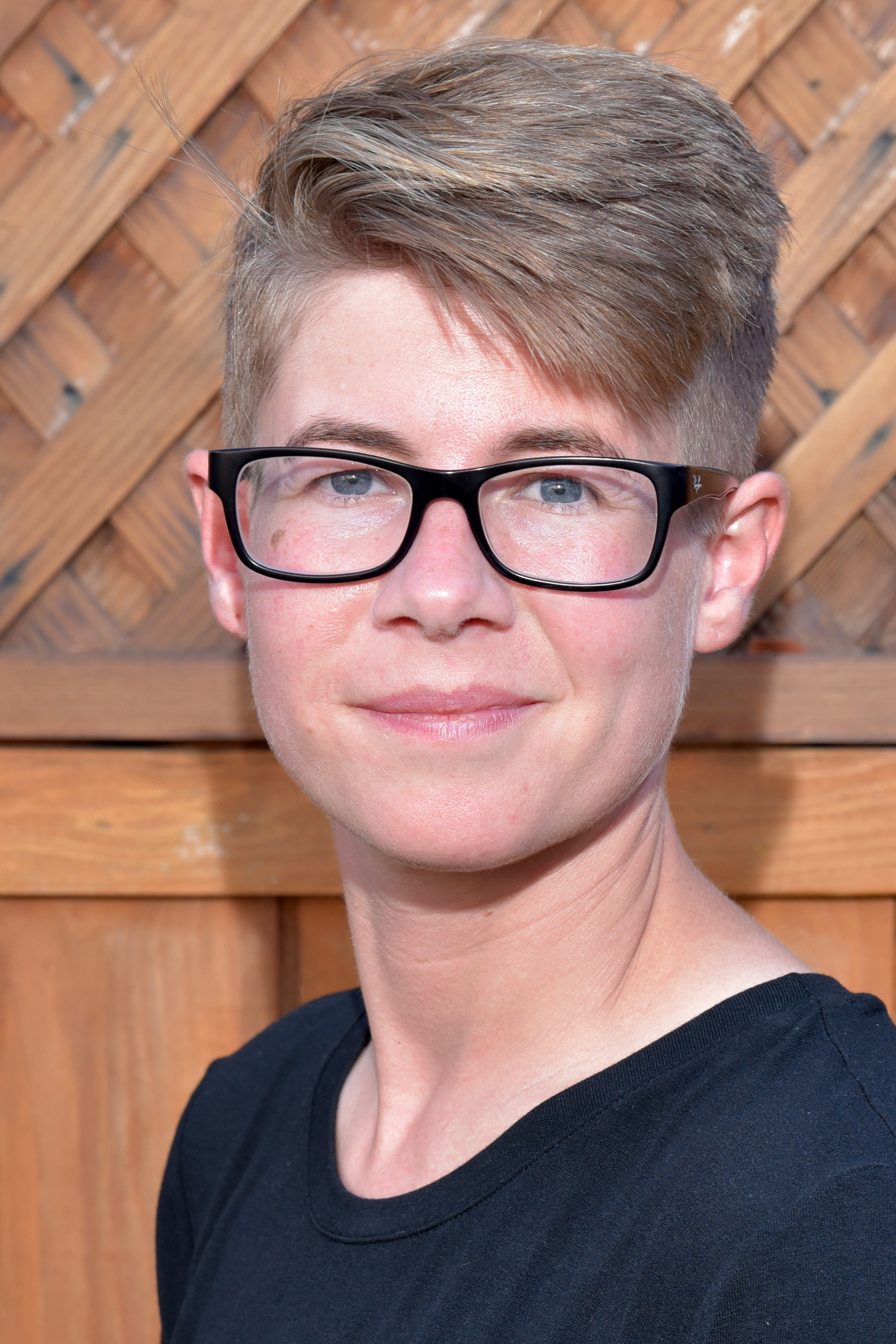
- Mills in 2019
- Born: 1981 or 1982 (age 44–45); Boston, Massachusetts, U.S.
- Occupations: Pornographic film director; screenwriter; producer; company executive; production company founder
- Known for: Gamma Films, Disruptive Films
- Spouse: Sara Luvv

Bree Mills (born 1981 or 1982) is an American pornographic film director, screenwriter and producer. She is head of the production company Gamma Films.

Having begun her career in Adult Entertainment in 2009 with Gamma Entertainment as a Marketing Director, Mills moved on to become the head of creative content six years later to create Gamma's websites Girlsway and PureTaboo and most recently her newly launched master brand Adult Time.

== Early life ==
Mills was born in Boston, Massachusetts and Canadian-raised in London, Ontario, Canada and graduated from London Central Secondary School. Raised by a gay parent who came out when she was 8 years old, Mills was able to grow up in an openly accepting environment while exploring her own sexuality. A great lover of film, Mills considers herself a pop culture vulture; "I've watched a lot of films, read a lot of books, and watched a lot of television. It's in my genes." Allowing pop culture to influence her work, Mills creative inspiration comes from various sources from which she draws to craft her concepts. A creative remembering of her earlier years has been captured in Teenage Lesbian, which was released on Adult Time in September 2019.

In 2021, she founded Disruptive Films, a gay focused production label. She directed "The Last Course," first film under the banner.

== Personal life ==
Mills is married to former pornographic actress Sara Luvv.

== Filmography ==
Selected filmography

Year	Title	Description
2019	Teenage Lesbian	Writer/Director/Producer
2020	Perspective	
2021	The Last Course	
2025	Birth	

== Awards ==
- 2018 XBIZ Award – Director of the Year (Body of Work)
- 2018 XBIZ Award – Director of the Year (Feature Release)
- 2018 XBIZ Award – Best New Studio/Line – PureTaboo.com
- 2018 Doppio Senso Night Award – Best International Screenplay – Half His Age: A Teenage Tragedy
- 2018 XRCO Award – Best Director (Features)
- 2019 XBIZ Award – Director of the Year (Body of Work)
- 2019 XBIZ Award – Studio of the Year – Gamma Films
- 2019 NightMoves Award – Best Comedy/Parody/Spoof Release (Editor's Choice) – Anne: A Taboo Parody (with Craven Moorehead)
- 2019 XCritic Award – Best Director - Feature – Perspective
- 2019 XCritic Special Recognition Award – Mainstream Crossover
- 2020 XBIZ Award – Director of the Year (Feature Movie)
- 2020 XBIZ Award – Studio of the Year – Gamma Films
- 2020 AVN Award – Best Dramatic Screenplay – Perspective
- 2022 Trans Erotica Award – Best Scene Producer
- 2024 AVN Award – Best Screenplay - Featurette – Polar Opposites - Out of Our System (with Seth Gamble)
- 2025 XMA Award – Director of the Year (Individual Work) – Birth
- 2025 XMA Award – Best Screenplay – Birth
- 2025 NightMoves Award – Best Feature Director
