= Mobile porn =

Form of pornography for viewing on smartphones and similar mobile devices

Mobile porn, also known as mobile adult content, or cellphone adult content, is pornography transmitted over mobile telecommunications networks for consumption on mobile devices (mainly mobile phones, tablets and smartphones).

== History ==
Just like the internet and pay TV, the adult entertainment industry was one of the first forms of mass media to embrace mobile devices as a new means to distribute content. During 2002, Private Media Group became the first adult media company to employ a dedicated mobile specialist at Director level, David Jarvis, who had previously launched other mobile entertainment services for the likes of Vodafone and Vivendi Universal. This initiative led to the industry's first interactive adult SMS services, erotic mobile content aggregation and distribution as well as the first mobile internet (WAP) subscription site, called "Private Mobile", offering a small range of videos and images directly to consumers via mobile carrier networks. This service was intended for the increasing range of Private consumers using feature phones in Europe with colour screens.

From the mid-2000s onwards, many mobile network operators eventually deployed age verification systems and industry-regulated explicitness grading levels that gradually allowed mobile erotica to be legally purchased through gated mobile operator portal communities only by consenting adults.

With the introduction of smartphones in 2007 and portable tablet computers thereafter, increasing numbers of consumers in developed markets have moved away from these closed mobile operator communities and now access mobile erotica through the internet and mobile apps.

Widespread adoption of Apple's iPhone was initially expected to encourage growth in the mobile erotica industry. Following the release of the original iPhone in 2007, the search term "iPhone Porn" spiked considerably in popularity. with 37% of iPhone users watching video on their iPhone However, Apple chairman Steve Jobs made it clear that no adult content would ever be sold from Apple's App Store, and thousands of adult apps have been banned on the App Store. However, Apple's ban on adult apps has been criticized as being impractical and ineffective.

Other companies in the mobile and video industries situated themselves to take advantage of this trend. Google built a new phone system called Google Play that supports any application within reasonable decency guidelines. Since then, dedicated adult-only app stores like MiKandi and other mobile internet publishers have benefited from this gap in the market instead.

Following its inception in 2002, the mobile erotica business was expected to grow to a market value of $2.3 billion within its first eight years.

== North America ==
The North American mobile erotica market differs from Europe in that carriers were slow to allow adult sites to use their subscriber payment mechanisms such as SMS, slowing market growth. Alternate business models involve offering free videos in the 'tube' style of websites with advertising funding. For the cost of viewing an ad, users can get free video clips.

Verizon Wireless and Sprint Nextel Corporation announced as late as 2008 that they would allow some adult content to be viewed on their networks, while working to prevent access to this content by children. There have been expectations for some time that these companies will overcome age-verification, political, and religious challenges that have become a barrier to this market, to take advantage of the resulting increase in mobile web-surfing on their networks.

== Criticisms ==
There has been some criticism of mobile porn, namely the exposure of children to inappropriate and unregulated content. However, most mobile network operators have implemented age verification systems, which require that customers who want to buy porn through their phone legally prove that they are a consenting adult first.

Sony, the company which created the PlayStation Portable (PSP), say that they are unhappy with the spread of PSP porn, but claim to be unable to stop its spread.

== See also ==
- MiKandi
- Private Media Group
