= GameLink =

Adult entertainment and eCommerce company

Game Link International Limited
- Industry: Adult entertainment eCommerce
- Founded: 1993
- Area served: Worldwide
- Website: gamelink.com

GameLink is an adult entertainment and eCommerce company, focused on Video on demand (VOD), sex toys, and adult DVDs. It maintains an extensive database of adult performers and their films. With its Stream-to-Own service, GameLink offers cloud storage for entire adult libraries.

GameLink focuses on online distribution of adult content through its website. GameLink maintains distribution agreements with adult content providers and offers adult entertainment titles available in multiple media formats, including Apple and Windows devices, television set top boxes, PS3, and Xbox 360. GameLink uses recommendation technology that allows it to quickly learn users' preferences to recommend relevant products. In June 2020, the site added a subscription-based streaming service as well as a section dedicated to the purchase of individual porn clips.

== History ==
GameLink added streaming content delivery to its services in 1999 by delivering full movies as well as individual scenes. The company added scene-only download options in 2007, mobile options in 2010, and pay-per-minute streaming options in 2011. GameLink utilizes a system of pre-purchased minutes to allow viewers to watch the content in which they are interested. GameLink has a partnership with webcam portal VideoSecrets to offer live video chat with webcam models. In September 2013, GameLink added a news media section to its site, “Naked Truth”. The section includes product and film reviews, interviews, “best of” lists, and film trailers and previews.

== Affiliate program ==
GameLink operates an affiliate marketing program through which website administrators can promote its products, stars, and movies. The affiliate receives a percentage of sales by sending traffic to GameLink in a revenue sharing partnership, from which consumers can purchase movie packages.

== Recognitions ==
| Year | Nominee / work | Award | Result |
|---|---|---|---|
| 2010 | Businessman of the Year | XBIZ Award | Won |
| 2011 | Best Sex Toy Affiliate Program | GFY People's Choice | Won |
| 2013 | Community Figure of the Year | XBIZ Executive Awards | Won |
| 2013 | VOD Site of the Year | XBIZ Award | Nominated |
| 2013 | VOD Company of the Year | XBIZ Award | Won |
| 2013 | Online Retailer of the Year | XBIZ Award | Nominated |
| 2013 | Mobile Site of the Year | XBIZ Award | Nominated |
| 2013 | Retail Affiliate of the Year | XBIZ Award | Won |
| 2014 | Retail Site of the Year | XBIZ Award | Nominated |
| 2014 | Retail Affiliate of the Year | XBIZ Award | Won |
| 2014 | Internet Company of the Year | FSC Awards | Won |
| 2015 | Affiliate Program of the Year – Retail | XBIZ Award | Won |
| 2017 | Affiliate Program of the Year – Retail | XBIZ Award | Won |
