= List of pornography companies =

This list includes companies which produce, distribute or promote pornography.

Active independently
Active as subsidiary
Defunct and no longer active

Name	Type	Location	Year Established	Notes
3rd Degree	Studio/Distributor	Los Angeles, California, United States	2002	
Abbywinters.com	Studio/Distributor	Australia	2000	
Active Duty	Studio/Distributor		1997	Gay content, Owned by Gamma Entertainment
Adam & Eve	Studio/Distributor/Sex shop	Hillsborough, North Carolina, United States	1970	
Adult Film Database	Movie database		1991	
Anabolic Video	Studio/Distributor	Chatsworth, Los Angeles, California, United States	1991	Defunct in 2013
Athletic Model Guild	Studio/Distributor	El Cerrito, California, United States	1945	Gay content
ATK	Studio/Distributor	Florida, United States	1996	
Bang Bros	Studio/Distributor/Website	Miami, Florida, United States	2000	Owned by WGCZ Holding
Beate Uhse AG		Flensburg, Germany	1946	
BelAmi	Studio/Distributor/Website	Bratislava, Slovakia	1993	Gay content
Brasileirinhas	Studio/Distributor	São Paulo, Brazil	1996	
Brazzers	Studio/Distributor/Website	Montreal, Quebec, Canada	2005	Owned by Aylo
Caballero Home Video	Studio/Distributor	Canoga Park, California, United States	1974	
ClubJenna	Studio/Distributor	Scottsdale, Arizona, United States	2000	
CineMagic Co.	Studio/Distributor	Japan	1983	
Color Climax Corporation	Studio/Distributor	Copenhagen, Denmark	1967	
Cross	Studio	Ebisu, Tokyo, Japan	2005	Defunct in 2008
Cazzo Film	Studio			Gay content
Coat Corporation	Studio			Gay content
Cobra Video	Studio			Gay content
Colt Studio Group	Studio			Gay content
Corbin Fisher	Studio/Distributor/Website	Las Vegas, Nevada, United States	2004	Gay content
Devil's Film	Studio/Distributor	Chatsworth, California, United States		
Diabolic Video	Studio/Distributor	Chatsworth, California, United States	1998	
Digital Playground	Studio/Distributor	Burbank, Los Angeles, California, United States	1993	Owned by Aylo
Diva Futura	Studio/Distributor	Italy	1983	
Elegant Angel	Studio/Distributor	Canoga Park, Los Angeles, California, United States	1990	
Eurocreme	Studio/Distributor	London, United Kingdom	2002	Gay content
Evil Angel	Studio/Distributor	Van Nuys, Los Angeles, California, United States	1989	
Extreme Associates	Studio/Distributor	North Hollywood, California, United States	1997	
Falcon Studios	Studio			Gay content
Flava Works	Studio			Gay content
French Twinks	Studio			Gay content
Grooby Productions	Studio			Gay content
h.m.p.	Studio			
Homegrown Video	Studio/Distributor	Los Angeles, United States	1982	
Hokuto Corporation		Ebisu, Tokyo, Japan	1990	Subsidiaries: CineMagic Co., Dogma studio, Moodyz, S1 No. 1 Style
Hustler Video	Studio/Distributor		1998	
HotMale	Studio			Gay content
Innocent Pictures	Studio			
Internet Adult Film Database	Movie database		1995	
Transfuxed	Studio			Gay content
Jill Kelly Productions	Studio			
JM Productions	Studio/Distributor	Chatsworth, Los Angeles, California, United States	2001	
John Thompson Productions	Studio			
Jules Jordan Video	Studio			
Kink.com	Studio/Distributor/Website	San Francisco, California, United States	1997	BDSM
Kuki Inc.	Studio			
LiveJasmin	Adult camming website		2001	
Larry Flynt Publications		Beverly Hills, California, United States	1976	Subsidiaries: Hustler, Hustler Video, Hustler Hollywood, Hustler Club, Barely Legal
Lucas Entertainment	Studio			Gay content
Mantra Films	Studio/Distributor	Santa Monica, California, United States	1998	
Marc Dorcel	Studio			
Mario Salieri	Studio/Distributor/Website	Italy	1986	Taboo
Men.com	Studio/Distributor/Website	Las Vegas, Nevada, United States	2003	Gay content / Owned by Aylo
Model Media	Studio/Distributor/Website	China	2019	
Naughty America	Studio/Distributor/Website	San Diego, California, United States	2001	
New Sensations	Studio/Distributor		1993	
Nova Studios	Studio			Gay content
Penthouse	Studio/Distributor			Owned by WGCZ Holding
PeterFever	Studio/Distributor/Website	California, United States	2008	Gay content / Owned by ZBuckz
Pink and white productions	Studio			Gay content
Pink Visual	Studio/Distributor/Website	Van Nuys, California, United States	2004	
Playboy		Beverly Hills, California, United States	1953	
Pornhub	Video sharing	Montreal, Quebec, Canada	2007	Owned by Aylo
PornMD	Video sharing		2005	
Private Media Group	Studio/Distributor	Barcelona, Spain	1965	
Puzzy Power	Studio			
Raging Stallion Studios	Studio			Gay content
Red Light District Video	Studio/Distributor	Chatsworth, California, United States	2001	
Red Hot	Studio			
RedTube	Video sharing	Houston, Texas	2007	Owned by Aylo
Reality Kings	Studio/Distributor	Florida, Miami Beach, United States	2000	Owned by Aylo
SCREW	Studio/Distributor	Knoxville, Tennessee, United States	1968	Subsidiaries: SCREW TV, Owned by Mediarazzi
Soft on Demand	Studio			
Sean Cody	Studio/Distributor/Website	San Diego, California, United States	2001	Gay content / Owned by Aylo
Titan Media	Studio			Gay content
The Score Group	Studio/Distributor	Miami, Florida, United States	1991	
Treasure Island Media	Studio			Gay content
Triga Films	Studio			Gay content
Sin City	Studio/Distributor		1987	
Smash Pictures	Studio/Distributor	Chatsworth, California, United States	2001	
Third Degree Films	Studio/Distributor	Los Angeles, California, United States	2002	
Third World Media	Studio/Distributor	Chatsworth, California, United States	1999	
VCA Pictures	Studio			
Vivid Entertainment	Studio/Distributor	Los Angeles, California, United States	1984	
VOY Productions	Studio/Distributor	Vancouver Island, Canada	1998	creating high-quality, authentic adult content voyproductions.com
Wanz Factory	Studio/Distributor	Toshima, Tokyo, Japan	2000	
Wicked Pictures	Studio/Distributor	Canoga Park, California, United States	1993	Owned by Gamma Entertainment
XHamster	Video sharing	Limassol, Cyprus	2007	Owned by Hammy Media Ltd
Xtube	Video sharing	Toronto, Ontario, Canada	2006	Defunct in 2021
XNXX	Video sharing	Paris, France	2000	Owned by WGCZ Holding
XVideos	Video sharing		2007	Owned by WGCZ Holding
YouPorn	Video sharing	Los Angeles, California, United States	2006	Owned by Aylo
Zero Tolerance Entertainment	Studio/Distributor	Los Angeles, California, United States	2002	

== See also ==
- List of film production companies
- List of pornographic film studios
- List of pornographic film directors
- List of pornographic magazines
- MindGeek
