= List of pornographic film studios =

The following is a list of pornographic film studios.

== A ==
- Abbywinters.com (Australia)
- Active Duty (includes gay content)
- Alice Japan (Japan)
- Anabolic Video (US) (defunct)
- Athletic Model Guild (includes gay content)
- Atlas21 (Japan)
- Attackers (Japan)

== B ==
- Bang Bros
- Beate Uhse AG (Germany)
- BelAmi (includes gay content)
- Black Spark (includes gay content)
- Blacked (US)
- Brasileirinhas (Brazil)
- Brazzers (Canada)

== C ==
- Caballero Home Video (US)
- Cazzo Film (includes gay content)
- CineMagic (Japan)
- ClubJenna (US)
- Coat Corporation (includes gay content)
- Cobra Video (includes gay content)
- CockyBoys (includes gay content)
- Color Climax Corporation (Denmark)
- Colt Studio Group (includes gay content)
- Corbin Fisher (includes gay content)
- Cross (Japan) (defunct)
- Crystal-Eizou (Japan)

== D ==
- Devil's Film (includes gay content)
- Diabolic Video (US)
- Digital Playground (US)
- Diva Futura (Italy) (defunct)
- DogFart (US)
- Dogma (Japan)

== E ==
- Elegant Angel (US)
- Eurocreme (includes gay content)
- Evil Angel (US, includes gay content)
- Extreme Associates (US)

== F ==
- Fakku (hentai content)
- Falcon Studios (includes gay content)
- Flava Works (includes gay content)
- French Twinks (includes gay content)

== G ==
- Glory Quest (Japan)
- Grooby Productions (Trans content)

== H ==
- h.m.p. (Japan)
- Hokuto Corporation (Japan)
- Homegrown Video (US)
- Hot Entertainment (Japan)
- Hustler Video (US)

== I ==
- IdeaPocket (Japan)
- Innocent Pictures (Denmark)
- Intersec Interactive Inc. (United States)

== J ==
- Japan Home Video (Japan)
- Jill Kelly Productions (US)
- JM Productions (US)
- John Thompson Productions (Germany)
- Jules Jordan Video (US)

== K ==
- Kink.com (US, includes gay content)
- KM Produce (Japan)
- Kuki Inc. (Japan)

== L ==
- Larry Flynt Publications (US)
- Lucas Entertainment (includes gay content)

== M ==
- Mantra Films (US)
- Max-A (Japan)
- Million Film (Japan) (defunct)
- Moodyz (Japan)
- Mofos
- Model Media (C)
- Muteki (Japan)

== N ==
- Naughty America (US)
- New Sensations (US)
- Ninn Worx (US)
- Nova Studios (includes gay content) (defunct)

== P ==
- PeterFever (includes gay content)
- Pink and White Productions (includes gay content)
- Pink Visual (US)
- Playboy (US)
- Private Media Group (Sweden)
- Puzzy Power (Denmark)

== R ==
- Raging Stallion Studios (includes gay content)
- Reality Kings (US)
- Reckless Youth
- Red Hot (UK) (defunct)
- Red Light District Video (US)

== S ==
- S1 No. 1 Style (Japan)
- The Score Group (US)
- Sean Cody (includes gay content)
- Shane's World Studios (includes gay content)
- Shintōhō Eiga (Japan)
- Sin City (US) (defunct)
- Smash Pictures (US)
- Soft On Demand (Japan)
- Sssh.com (US) (Porn for Women)

== T ==
- Ten Broadcasting (Canada)
- Third Degree Films (US)
- Third World Media (US)
- Titan Media (includes gay content)
- Total Media Agency (Japan)
- Treasure Island Media (includes gay content)
- Triga Films (includes gay content)
- Try-Heart Corporation (Japan)
- Tushy (US)

== V ==
- VCA Pictures (US)
- Video Marc Dorcel
- Vivid Entertainment (US)
- Vixen Media Group (US)
- Vouyer Media (US)

== W ==
- Wanz Factory (Japan)
- Wicked Pictures (US)

== Z ==
- Zero Tolerance Entertainment (US)

== See also ==
- List of film studios
- List of pornographic performers by decade
- List of pornographic magazines
- List of pornographic film directors
- List of pornography companies
