= Ethical Capital Partners =

Canadian private equity firm

- Type: Private
- Industry: Equity firm
- Founded: 2022; 4 years ago
- Founder: Rocco Meliambro
- Headquarters: Montreal, Quebec, Canada
- Key people: Rocco Meliambro (chairman); Fady Mansour (Managing Partner); Mike Cosic (Chief Financial Officer); Solomon Friedman (Partner, VP Compliance); Derek Ogden (Partner, VP Law Enforcement Relations)
- Subsidiaries: Aylo
- Website: ethicalcapitalpartners.com

Ethical Capital Partners (ECP) is a Canadian private equity firm based in Ottawa, Ontario. Founded in 2022, the firm became widely known after acquiring MindGeek, the parent company of Pornhub, Brazzers and RedTube, in March 2023. MindGeek was renamed Aylo in August 2023.

== History ==
Ethical Capital Partners was launched in 2022 in Montreal. In March 2023, ECP acquired MindGeek, the parent company of Pornhub and other adult-entertainment websites, for 400 million US$ from Bernd Bergmair, Feras Antoon and David Tassillo. At the time of the acquisition, MindGeek was facing legal and regulatory scrutiny over non-consensual sexual content and material involving minors on its platforms.

== Class-Action Settlement ==
In August 2026, Aylo reached a proposed US$120 million class-action settlement. The agreement seeks to resolve more than five years of litigation across two consolidated federal class-action lawsuits originally filed in California and Alabama. The detailed financial and operational terms of the agreement were subsequently disclosed in corporate filings by its Dublin-based subsidiary, Aylo Billing Ltd.

=== Allegations and Legal Scope ===
Plaintiffs alleged that Aylo knowingly profited from a sex-trafficking venture in violation of the United States Trafficking Victims Protection Reauthorization Act. The lawsuits asserted that the company hosted, possessed, and distributed non-consensual sexually explicit videos featuring individuals who were minors at the time of filming. These videos collectively accumulated over 684 million views across platforms operated by the company, including Pornhub, YouPorn, and RedTube.

Aylo denied all allegations of liability. According to corporate accounts, the agreement is structured as a "Stipulation of Settlement" to resolve the multi-year litigation without any admission of wrongdoing or liability by the firm or its corporate affiliates.

=== Financial Structure ===
The payment structure is deferred across a multi-year timeline extending into the 2030s to mitigate immediate cash flow impacts on the parent company's operations:

- Initial Deposit: An upfront payment of US$25 million was required and has been deposited into the designated settlement fund.
- Deferred Installments: The remaining balance is scheduled to be distributed in six annual installments of US$15.833 million.

Although the high-revenue Irish subsidiary Aylo Billing Ltd was named as a co-defendant in the litigation, it has been fully indemnified by parent group companies. Consequently, no separate financial provisions were carved out from the subsidiary's specific financial accounts.
