= Corbin Fisher =

American gay pornography studio

- Company type: LLC
- Industry: Film
- Genre: Film studio
- Founded: 2004; 22 years ago
- Founder: Corbin Fisher
- Headquarters: Las Vegas Valley, Nevada, US
- Key people: Jason Gibson, CEO; Brian Dunlap, Vice President
- Products: Gay pornography
- Website: www.corbinfisher.com

Corbin Fisher is an American independent film studio with a focus on gay pornography, based in Las Vegas, Nevada. The studio maintains a website at CorbinFisher.com; other web properties of the company include AmateurCollegeMen.com, AmateurCollegeSex.com, CFSelect.com, CorbinFisherLive.com, CorbinsCoeds.com, and ShopCorbinFisher.com. The founder of Corbin Fisher, who goes by the same name as an alias, started filming men and making videos during his spare time, and started the website CorbinFisher.com in 2004. The company released its first full-length DVD in September 2008. Since 2009, the company has collaborated with the European studio BelAmi on movie production and cross-distribution.

Corbin Fisher's products have been well-received, both by others within the industry and by media commentators. In 2006, Corbin Fisher won an award in the category of Adult Gay Megasite at the Cybersocket Awards. Since then, it has been recognized with multiple nominations for awards within the industry; both for its video content and websites. The company received the Free Speech Coalition Award of Excellence at the 2010 Cybersocket Awards, and was named Gay Site of the Year at the 2011 Xbiz Awards.

== History ==
Jason Gibson, the founder of Corbin Fisher, who uses the same name as an alias, previously held jobs including police officer and human resources manager. With a prior interest in pornography, Fisher began to film men during his weekends off from these jobs. In January 2004, he started the website CorbinFisher.com, and the business grew quickly since then. AmateurCollegeMen.com was also started in 2004. In a 2006 interview, he told Adult Video News, "It was a steep learning curve. I look back at some of my earliest work and cringe. Filming sex and getting the right shots while retaining some semblance of naturalness and spontaneity is not as easy as it sounds."

Excelsior Productions, the parent company of Corbin Fisher, was founded in 2005 by chief executive Jason Gibson. Brian Dunlap became marketing director at Excelsior Productions in November 2005. In February 2006, Corbin Fisher participated as a sponsor in "The Gay Phoenix Forum", an event held for webmasters and website visitors. In February 2011, the company moved its headquarters from Florida to Las Vegas.

== Products ==
In August 2006, Corbin Fisher launched the website AmateurCollegeSex.com, which focused on "straight-guy niche content". Brian Dunlap explained the emphasis of the new site, "The guys are straight. This is what they do when the cameras aren't on, so we wanted to give surfers a glimpse into that part of who the guys are." The site was created to serve as a complement to Corbin Fisher's site AmateurCollegeMen.com, and Dunlap commented on the business potential of the two sites for webmasters, "Maybe a big portion of their traffic has already signed up to Corbin Fisher. Well, now they can start earning new money off those old surfers. This is an opportunity to promote not just one site, but two. There's an opportunity to earn two commissions off one referral." By August 2007, AmateurCollegeMen.com had about 500 "solo and hardcore all-male videos". In August 2008 Corbin Fisher described itself as a website offering media of amateur sex between attractive young people at universities. The website explained that most of the models on the site were heterosexual young men.

The company released its first full-length DVD in September 2008, called The Best of Lucas: Volume I. The DVD highlighted five scenes with Lucas, a favorite actor by fans of the website who was one of the site's first heterosexual models to appear in male-male scenes. Bruno Gmunder distributed the DVDs in Europe. Bruno Gmunder included content from the Corbin Fisher photo book Playing Hard to Get in some of its books released in 2009. Since then, Corbin Fisher has released 8 other DVDs.

In July 2009, the gay Europorn studio Bel Ami chose Corbin Fisher as its first collaboration on a production with a studio based in the United States, for their Five Americans in Prague movie. Production included filming in San Francisco, Prague and Budapest. The first scene that developed out of the collaboration with Bel Ami was released in July 2009. Though one actor spoke English and the other Czech, the language barrier was not an issue during filming. The deal also included cross-platform marketing and distribution, with "feature scenes drawn from each other's extensive back catalogs" shown weekly on both sites.

In January and February 2011, Corbin Fisher launched GuysGoneBi.com along with CorbinsCoeds.com. Guysgonebi.com featured two males and one female per scene. About half of the scenes were exclusive to the site, while the other half were also on AmericanCollegeSex.com. CorbinsCoeds.com features all heterosexual scenes of AmericanCollegeSex.com. In September 2011, Corbin Fisher launched a pay-for-download site called CFSelect.com, which includes content from AmericanCollegeSex.com and AmericanCollegeMen.com. The clips are categorized under labels such as "Classic", "Collections" (which include scenes from their DVD releases along with top performers), and "Exclusive" (which include the site's exclusive gay clips). In October 2011, GuysGoneBi.com shut down and the Gay.xxx domain was purchased.

In October 2013, Corbin Fisher launched CorbinFisherLive.com, a live chat website for viewers to chat with the models.

== Copyright lawsuits ==
In October 2009, Corbin Fisher settled a legal dispute with Hunkfest, a cellphone content provider. The dispute was over a copyright infringement claim by Corbin Fisher against Hunkfest. The company attempted to settle with Hunkfest first but filed suit in United States federal court when their offer was rejected. "When we approach infringers, we usually offer a reasonable settlement. When it is rejected, my orders are to go full-bore. This company will take even the smallest infringer to court," said general counsel Randazza. Hunkfest's lawyer acknowledged that the settlement amount was significant but reasonable.

In February 2010, Corbin Fisher won a $990,000 judgment in United States federal court against an individual from Texas who had copied 66 of the company's films to DVD and sold them on eBay. The company took over a site that had copyrighted material without permission, PornILove.net, and cooperated in conjunction with other companies in the industry in order to attempt to ascertain the identities of the people committing copyright infringement.

In March 2011, Fisher sued 40,000 people who they claimed committed copyright infringement. This sparked some concern in the gay community that a number of teenagers had downloaded the content and would be outed by the lawsuit. Some had worried that outed gay teenagers would be prone to suicide. Fisher disputed this, saying that in all their legal dealings, none had ever led to a teenage suicide. Initially, Fisher offered amnesty to Internet users who came forward and admitted they downloaded content illegally. They could settle with Fisher by paying a one-time $1000 fee. Fisher described the people who downloaded the content as thieves. The suit also claims that any reasonable Internet user would secure their router, and those who did not and allowed content to be downloaded through their IP address were also guilty of copyright infringement. Fisher also sued a Swedish man who wrote a satirical email to them, admitting he had downloaded Fisher's content but told him the money would be paid out of a pot of gold he received from a leprechaun at the end of the rainbow. Fisher sued the man and subpoenaed his Google gmail account information, including his IP address.

== Commentary ==
In September 2005, RealLiveGuys.com marketing director Eddie K characterized Corbin Fisher as one of the "new hit gay porn sites that specialize in straight guys." In July 2008, Falcon Entertainment CEO Todd Montgomery said he admired the company and its development, "I've always had a lot of professional and personal admiration for [Corbin Fisher] because they really defined a new space in gay adult entertainment that didn't exist prior to the real broad adoption of the Internet." In August 2008, Gary Blumenthal, manager of a different pornographic site, OnTheHunt.com, commented on the focus of Corbin Fisher and Sean Cody, "Both http://www.SeanCody.com and http://www.CorbinFisher.com are niche-specific Web sites focusing on all-American jock-type guys, many of whom are 'gay for pay.'"

In December 2007, Dylan Fox of Gaywired.com noted that Corbin Fisher had become successful; "gay man's obsession with straight guys has created a booming Internet business that is raking in the cash." The Spanish language media site ENewspaper also commented on this phenomenon, observing that Corbin Fisher had successfully capitalized on appealing to those that appreciate videos where supposedly heterosexual men act in gay film.

Ernie Alderete of Bay Area Reporter reviewed the color photo collection Corbin Fisher's Amateur College Men distributed by Bruno Gmunder, and described it as "a collection of exciting color photos of college-age athletes in sexual poses progressing from soft-core to fully erect and stiff hard-core". Alderete criticized the focus of pictures in the book and the book's size, "But several factors prevent Amateur College Men from achieving greatness. Inexplicably, several of the photographs are out of focus." His review concluded, "Despite its flaws, this book is packed with interesting faces and nice bodies, the stuff many dreams could be made of. And it certainly lives up to its name: it delivers tons of absolutely fresh, USDA prime meat!"

In April 2009, ENewspaper classified Corbin Fisher in the world of gay pornography as among "website suppliers of videos", including Sean Cody, RandyBlue.com, CockyBoys, and StraightBoysFucking.com.

In June 2009, Jason Salzenstein of Edge Boston commented favorably of the Corbin Fisher-produced photo book Playing Hard to Get distributed by Bruno Gmunder, "In fact, one of the best things about this volume is its simplicity, and the natural beauty of the models. When 'boy next door' has come to mean Abercrombie & Fitch perfection, it's refreshing to see a book filled with guys who actually look like they could live in your neighborhood." Carsten Weidemann of the German language site Queer.de gave Playing Hard to Get a positive review, and noted that Corbin Fisher became successful quickly, calling the site "athletic, sexy".

== Released DVDs ==
- The Best Of Lucas: Volume 1 (2008)
- 3-Ways: Volume 1 (2008)
- First Times: Volume 1 (2009)
- Lucas & Dawson Down Under (2009)
- Down on the Farm (2009)
- Fraternity/Sorority Mixers (2012)
- Freshman Class: Volume 1 (2012)
- Multiplication Tables (2012)
- Pura Vida (2013)
- Magna Cum Loudly (2013)
- Hot, Ripped, & Raw (2014)
- Connor Unleashed (2014)

== Awards and nominations ==
Year	Award	Organization	Work	Category	Result	Ref
2006	Cybersocket Awards	Cybersocket Inc.	Website	Adult Gay Megasite	Won	
2006	WeHo Adult Website Award	WeHo Awards	Website	Best Adult Website	Nominated	
2006	Hunky Awards	HunkHunter's Haunts	Website	Best Amateur Site	Nominated	
2006	Hunky Awards	HunkHunter's Haunts	Video content	Best Original Movies Site	Nominated	
2007	Cybersocket Awards	Cybersocket Inc.	Video content	Best Original Content	Nominated	
2007	Cybersocket Awards	Cybersocket Inc.	Website	Best Amateur Video Site	Nominated	
2008	XBIZ Awards	XBIZ	Company	GLBT Web Company of the Year	Nominated	
2009	GAYVN Award	AVN Magazine	Website	Best Site of the Year	Nominated	
2009	GAYVN Award	AVN Magazine	Website	Best Amateur Site	Nominated	
2009	Grabby Adult Erotic Video Awards	GRAB Magazine	Website	Best Web Based Porn Site	Nominated	
2010	Cybersocket Awards	Cybersocket Inc.	Website	Free Speech Coalition Award of Excellence	Won	
2010	XBIZ Awards	XBIZ	Company	GLBT Company of the Year	Nominated	
2011	XBIZ Awards	XBIZ	Website	Gay Site of the Year	Won	

== See also ==
- List of male performers in gay porn films
- List of pornographic magazines
- List of pornographic movie studios
- Gay for pay
- Gay pornography
- Pornographic actor
