= Bernd Bergmair =

Austrian-British businessman

- Born: 1968 (age 57–58); Linz, Austria
- Education: Johannes Kepler University Linz
- Occupation: Businessman
- Known for: Former majority owner of Pornhub and MindGeek
- Spouse: Priscila Bergmair
- Children: 3

Bernd Bergmair (also spelled Bernard Bergemar, born 1968 in Linz) is an Austrian businessman. He was previously a majority owner of privately held MindGeek, the Luxembourg-based media conglomerate behind popular porn sites such as Pornhub.

== Early life ==
Growing up in the 1970s and 1980s, Bergmair was a son of a farmer in Ansfelden in Upper Austria. He attended grammar school in Linz, and then transferred to HLBLA St. Florian to complete his secondary education. Bergmair went to college at the University of Linz, graduating in 1992 with a thesis on a topic related to corporate acquisition: Evaluation of corporations and financing strategies in connection with M & A, LBO and MBO.

== Career ==
In the 1990s, Bergmair worked for Goldman Sachs in New York City. In 2006, Bergmair became the owner of the porn website RedTube. In 2013, Bergmair sold the RedTube site to Manwin, now known as Aylo.

=== MindGeek ===
In December 2020, the Financial Times published a report on MindGeek's ownership, revealing that Bergmair or "Bernard Bergemar" as he had used in court documents was the company's majority owner. The Financial Times report prompted a parliamentary inquiry into Pornhub's practices in Canada, in which MindGeek directors and minority owners David Tassillo and Feras Antoon named a "Bernard Bergemar" as the principal owner. He owned more than half of the shares, but was a passive investor and not involved in the day-to-day business. British research platform Tortoise Media and Austrian magazine Dossier cooperated on an investigation.

In 2021, company records showed Bergemar lived in China, but he was found to be actually living in a mansion in London after the investigation by Tortoise Media. Soon after, his Brazilian wife Priscila Bergmair told The Sunday Times that she wanted her husband to cut ties with the company. In March 2023, Ethical Capital Partners purchased MindGeek for US$400 million, later renaming the media company to Aylo.
