= Pegas Productions =

Canadian pornographic film studio

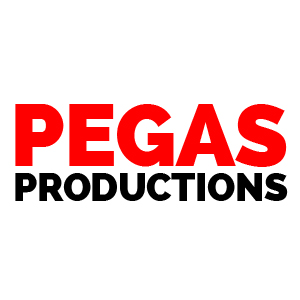
- Industry: Pornography
- Founded: 2006
- Headquarters: 945, avenue Newton; Quebec City, Quebec; G1P 4M3
- Owner: Nicolas Lafleur

Pegas Productions is a Canadian adult film studio based in Quebec City. The company is a major player in the Canadian adult film industry.

== History ==
Pegas Productions was founded by Nicolas Lafleur in 2006. Pegas released three DVDs in 2006 and quickly entered the digital landscape as they launched their website in 2007. By the end of 2007 the website had reached over one million hits. The company quickly gained attention as its saying of porn for Quebecers by Quebecers gained rapid praise by French-speaking Canadians. By 2010 Pegas Productions began seeing a presence in Europe, mainly France and Belgium.

== Porn acting academy ==
In 2014 Pegas Productions was having problems finding male talent. In mid 2014 Pegas Productions opened applications on their website. Over 1,200 applied 50 were decided on and 10 were invited to attend the classes. The class entailed two phases, in phase one invitees were graded on physical and character characteristics then were subject to health, psychological and social impact of being an adult actor. Six men moved onto phase two which included sexual auditions with female talent. At the end of the three day academy three men were hired. Pegas Productions have replicated this process three times in the years since.

== See also ==
- List of pornographic film studios
- List of pornography companies
