= Fabian Thylmann =

German businessman (born 1978)

- Born: 5 June 1978 (age 48); Aachen, West Germany
- Occupations: Angel investor, entrepreneur
- Years active: 1999–present
- Known for: Aylo
- Children: 4

Fabian Thylmann (born 5 June 1978) is a German businessman who was the founder and managing partner of the Internet pornography conglomerate Aylo (initially as Manwin, formerly MindGeek). In October 2013, he sold his stake in the company, which was at the time the largest pornography operator in the world.

== Life and career ==
Thylmann was born in Aachen. He started computer programming when he was 17. His breakthrough came in the late 1990s when he developed software called NATS (Next-generation Affiliate Tracking Software), which enabled website operators to track users' clicks on advertisements and links so that they could be paid commission. Thylmann used the money he made with NATS to buy various Internet pornography companies, and in March 2010, he established Manwin by acquiring the companies Mensef and Interhub. Manwin bought Pornhub, YouPorn, RedTube, Brazzers, Twistys.com, Mofos and other pornography websites.

=== Sale of Manwin ===
In October 2013, Thylmann stepped down and sold Manwin for €73 million, for undisclosed reasons.

Upon the sale of Manwin, Thylmann wrote in a letter to employees:

It is with a sad heart that I have to announce that I have decided to sell Manwin to Manwin's top management team. Please believe me that this decision has been one of the hardest in our lives for both my wife and myself. [...] Both myself and Manwin are at a stage where I can no longer add significant value to the best of my ability. I hope I have taught all of you and management the right values to be able to continue the company in the best possible way and I am looking forward to following its development.

According to a 2016 interview with EU-Startups, Thylmann claimed that he didn't miss the "adrenaline" and responsibilities that came with running Manwin, stating that he was working on "fun relaxing projects".

=== Extradition and indictment ===
In December 2012, Thylmann was extradited from Belgium to Germany on suspicion of tax evasion. He did not contest the extradition order, although he reportedly denied avoiding paying tax.

In April 2015, Thylmann was indicted by the Cologne, Germany federal prosecutor on tax evasion charges. The charges were dropped when he paid 5 million euros but he still faces a suspended sentence in another case.
