= WhyNotBi =

Bisexual pornography company

WhyNotBi.com
- Type: Subsidiary
- Industry: Bisexual pornography
- Genre: Bisexual pornography
- Founded: 2019; 7 years ago
- Headquarters: Woodland Hills, Los Angeles, U.S.
- Owner: MG Premium Ltd.
- Parent: Aylo
- Website: www.whynotbi.com

WhyNotBi.com (company name: MG Premium Ltd.) is a producer of bisexual internet pornography content oriented towards bisexual men. It is owned by Aylo.

== History ==
In August 2018, the MindGeek subsidiary Men.com released its first scene featuring MMF bisexual porn titled "The Challenge", which created controversy over whether bisexual porn belonged on a gay porn website. Men.com stated that they decided to feature bisexual content because "After asking our users what they would like to see, a surprisingly large number asked for a fully bisexual scene." Following a backlash over the scene, Men.com decided to no longer feature more bisexual content. Because the release of the bisexual scene "left many angry gay porn fans in complete shock", the MindGeek conglomerate decided to create a separate studio for bisexual porn called "WhyNotBi.com" and feature bisexual content on the WhyNotBi.com website instead of the Men.com website. WhyNotBi is MindGeek's first bisexual porn site.

The website aims to be "uninhibited" and feature "taboo fantasies", with a representative claiming that "It doesn’t matter if you like studs with big dicks, blondes with big tits, young hunks, cute teens or all of the above — WhyNotBi has something for everyone", including bisexual threesomes and orgies, spouse swapping, boyfriend sharing, and cuckoldry.

WhyNotBi features exclusively bisexual content and is geared towards bisexual men. The scenes place the “focus on the men” and many scenes have featured the bisexual debuts of prominent pornographic actors generally known for acting in gay porn. Gay porn actors including Wesley Woods, Jackson Traynor, Thyle Knoxx, and Justin Matthews have made their first bisexual scenes on WhyNotBi. Reactions have been mixed, with the website receiving both praise and criticism. Bisexual men have expressed support for a studio geared towards them, while some gay men have objected by claiming that gay porn actors having sex with women is heteronormative. The website has been praised for its diversity for featuring gay, bisexual, heterosexual, and transgender content in its scenes.

== Awards ==
WhyNotBi's film Free For All won "Best Bi Sex Scene" at the 2020 GayVN Awards. In 2021, WhyNotBi's film The Elevator Goes Both Ways won "Best Bi Sex Scene" at the GayVN Awards.

== See also ==
- Bisexual pornography
- Straight-for-pay
- Sexual fluidity
