= Nicole Aniston =

American actress and model (born 1987)

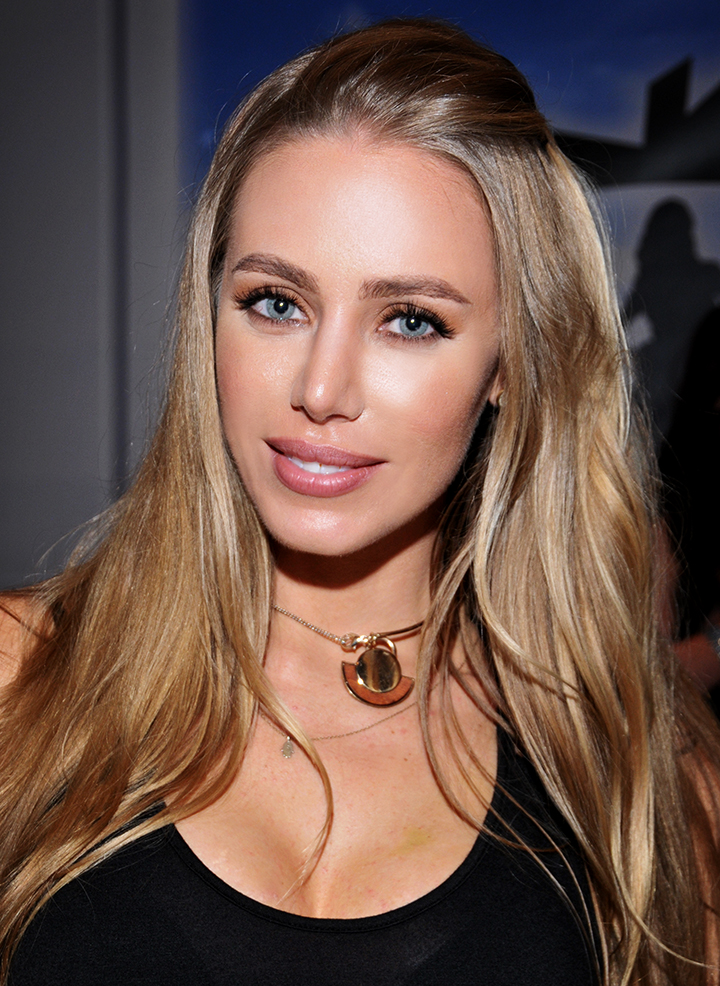
- Aniston in 2016
- Occupations: Pornographic film actress; OnlyFans content creator
- Years active: 2009–present

Nicole Aniston is an American pornographic film actress. She was the 2013 Penthouse Pet of the Year.

== Career ==
Aniston's first credited adult film was released in 2009 by the adult studio Sticky Video. She began working with Reality Kings in late 2010. Aniston starred in a Cum Catcher scene that was released via Reality Kings in October 2010, and she also starred in the All Hunnies group sex scene with Rebeca Linares and Bill Bailey, which was promoted via Reality Kings in November 2010. From this time on, Aniston started to appear in porn productions. Aniston's scene with Mike Adriano was featured in the Bang Bros compilation title Big Tit Creampie #13 (2011), which won "Best Internal Release" at the 30th AVN Awards. Her work in the Elegant Angel movie Hard Bodies (2011) was nominated for "Best All-Sex Release" at the 29th AVN Awards and "Gonzo Release of the Year" at the 2012 XBIZ Awards. Aniston's group sex scene with Angel Vain, Buddy Davis and Pauly Harker in the Bang Bros DVD Ass Parade #32 (2011) that was nominated for "All-Sex Release of the Year" at the 2012 XBIZ Awards and her group shoot with Anissa Kate, Misty Stone, Skin Diamond and Karlo Karrera in the Marc Dorcel film In Bed With Katsuni (2012), which was nominated for "Best Gonzo Movie" at the 2012 Erotic Lounge Awards and "European Non-Feature Release of the Year" at the 2013 XBIZ Awards.

In early 2012, Aniston began modeling for Penthouse. She won Pet of the Month in August 2012 and Pet of the Year in 2013.

In 2012, Aniston began working with Brazzers. Her first Brazzers scene was shot with co-star Johnny Sins. Aniston began doing work and shot Office 4-Play: Christmas Eve Edition! group shoot with Chanel Preston, Krissy Lynn, Tanya Tate, and Keiran Lee in December 2012.

In late 2017, Nicole Aniston took part in season 2 of the Brazzers House web series portraying ten porn stars living together in a mansion. Fans voted for their favorite Brazzers House contestants, with the winner taking home a $20,000 prize. Aniston made it to the final whereupon she participated in Brazzers House 2 Finale group sex scene with Abella Danger, Kelsi Monroe, Monique Alexander, Skyla Novea, Charles Dera, Danny Mountain, Isiah Maxwell, J-Mac, Keiran Lee, Ricky Johnson, and Xander Corvus. The final scene showcased in the Brazzers DVD Brazzers House #2 (2018) was nominated for "Best Gonzo Movie" at the 36th AVN Awards.

Aniston launched her own website in 2013. The website is a subscription-based service that allows fans to view exclusive content in the form of photos, gifs and high-definition video. Her site has won industry awards, including "Most outrageous site", "Best Pornstar site" and "Best Web director" at the annual AVN Awards.

In 2018, she was selected as a Vixen Angel. Aniston is also involved in feature dancing in 2017, 2018, and 2019 Aniston made appearances at clubs across the United States meeting fans and dancing at local strip clubs.

=== Parodies ===
Over the years Aniston has appeared in porn parodies. Aniston starred in the Septo Studios spoof OMG…It's The Flashdance XXX Parody (2011) that was nominated for "Best Music Soundtrack" at the 2013 AVN Awards. She appeared in the Wicked Pictures parody Spartacus MMXII: The Beginning (2012) which won "Best Parody: Drama" at the 2013 AVN Awards. Aniston also starred in Hustler Video's release This Ain't The Smurfs XXX (2012) that was nominated for "Best 3D Release" at the 2013 AVN and XRCO Awards and she starred in the Exquisite production Xena XXX: An Exquisite Films Parody (2012) which was nominated for "Adult Parody of the Year" at the 2013 Sex Awards.

Aniston's porn parodies include the Wicked Pictures' production Men In Black: A Hardcore Parody (2012). Directed by Brad Armstrong, the sci-fi spoof featured Aniston in a three-way with Kaylani Lei and Armstrong that was nominated for "Most Outrageous Sex Scene" at the 2013 AVN Awards. Many of these scenes have been showcased in the Brazzers compilation titled Brazzers Presents: The Parodies #6 (2016), which was nominated for "Best Parody" at the 2018 AVN Awards.

== Personal life ==
Aniston is an open user of cannabis, even smoking it during adult films. She is an advocate for the decriminalization of non-medical cannabis in the United States as well as the use of medical cannabis. Aniston is of mixed German and Greek heritage.

== Filmography ==
Year	Work	Role	Notes
2018	A Cam Life	Herself	Documentary
2020	Reboot Camp	Nicole	

=== Television ===
Year	Show	Role	Notes
2012	29th AVN Awards	Herself - Host	Television award show premiere
2014	31st AVN Awards	Herself	Television award show premiere
2015	32nd AVN Awards	Herself	Television award show premiere
2017–2019	Holly Randall Unfiltered	Herself	Appeared in two episodes

== Awards ==
- 2012 Penthouse August Pet of the Month
- 2013 Penthouse Pet of the Year
- 2014 Twistys Treat of the Year
- 2025 XMA Award – Best Sex Scene - Virtual Reality – Palm Royale (with Blake Blossom, Romi Rain & Ryan Driller)

== See also ==
- List of pornographic film actors who have appeared in mainstream films

1970s	Evelyn Treacher	Stephanie McLean	Tina McDowall	Patricia Barrett	Avril Lund
1970s	Anneka Di Lorenzo	Laura Bennett Doone	Victoria Lynn Johnson	Dominique Maure	Cheryl Rixon
1980s	Isabella Ardigo	Danielle Deneux	Corinne Alphen	Sheila Kennedy	Linda Kenton
1980s	None	Cody Carmack	Mindy Farrar	Patty Mullen	Ginger Miller
1990s	Stephanie Page	Simone Brigitte	Jisel	Julie Strain	Sasha Vinni
1990s	Gina LaMarca	Andi Sue Irwin	Elizabeth Ann Hilden	Paige Summers	Nikie St. Gilles
2000s	Juliet Cariaga	Zdeňka Podkapová	Megan Mason	Sunny Leone	Victoria Zdrok
2000s	Martina Warren	Jamie Lynn	Heather Vandeven	Erica Ellyson	Taya Parker
2010s	Taylor Vixen	Nikki Benz	Jenna Rose	Nicole Aniston	Lexi Belle
2010s	Layla Sin	Kenna James	Jenna Sativa	Gina Valentina	Gianna Dior
2020s	Lacy Lennon	Kenzie Anne	Amber Marie	Tahlia Paris	Renee Olstead
2020s	Kassie Wallis	-	-	-	-
