= Twistys =

Canadian adult film studio

- Type: Private Subsidiary
- Industry: Pornography
- Genre: Hardcore and Softcore
- Founded: November 1, 2012; 13 years ago
- Founders: Aylo
- Headquarters: Montreal, Quebec, Canada
- Area served: Worldwide
- Key people: Feras Antoon (CEO), David Tassilo (COO); Lenc Sterili (CEO)
- Products: Pornographic films
- Parent: Aylo
- Website: Twistys

Twistys is a major adult film studio, producing its eponymous pornography website, Twistys.com, a variety site that caters to many different preferences.

The site Twistys.com launched in 2001. While occasionally featuring girl-girl and hardcore, the site predominantly focused on softcore pornography and solo content. After its acquisition by Aylo in 2011, the site shifted its focus to include more hardcore boy-girl content. However, by 2019, the site shifted back to a focus on "all girl" content, hosting girl-girl (lesbian) and solo, or, as advertised, "Lesbian Glam Porn." As of 2025, the site is no longer updating.

== About ==
The Twistys website was acquired by Mindgeek in 2011. Prior to MindGeek's acquisition, Twistys, along with sister sites: GayTube, SexTube and TrannyTube, belonged to Carsed Marketing. The Twisty's website is distinctive due to its softer approach to pornography. Despite elements of hardcore content, much of Twistys' content feature softcore pornography as well. The majority of content is accessible with a monthly membership. Its popularity is heightened by the fact that the site is updated daily, adding new material to the database constantly.

Twistys regularly published content from prominent photographers and videographers, most notably Dean Capture, Tammy Sands, and Holly Randall.

The Twistys website is most notable for its "Treat of the Month." Since 2005, Twistys Treat of the month highlights a featured model with appearances in interviews, pictorials, and videos throughout the month. The Treat of the Month was also featured on a Q and A session on the members forum, offering Twistys subscribers the opportunity to interact with Treats. In 2009, Twistys launched its first Twistys Treat of the Year contest where site members could vote from among the Treats of the Month for Treat of the Year. The winner would receive a cash prize and would receive an additional feature on the website. In 2012, Twistys signed three former Twistys Treats of the Month to exclusive one-year contracts: Taylor Vixen, Emily Addison, and Brett Rossi. During the contract period, the models were featured extensively on the website and represented the Twistys brand.

In 2018, Twistys signed an exclusive Twistys girl-girl contract with cam model Molly Stewart, signaling a return to the glamour and girl-focused content for which the website had been associated.

== Content ==
Originally, Twistys.com principally focused on softcore pornography with genres in solo masturbation film, glamour photography, and girl-girl (lesbian content), being one of the first websites principally focused on "all girl" content. From 2011 to 2019, the site moved to include more hardcore (boy-girl) content. Since 2020, Twistys pivoted back to "all girl" softcore glamour and lesbian content.

Twistys is notable for its focus on porn stars providing interviews and biographies to encourage member engagement with featured models on the site.

== Twistys Treat of the Year Controversy ==
In 2014, Twistys.com became embroiled in a controversy between the company and subscribers when users on the Members Forum at Twistys pointed out irregularities in their "Treat of the Year" contest, an annual competition where fans vote for their favorite Twistys Treat of the Month of the previous year. Several forum users pointed out the significant delay in announcing the winner and runner-up, when in prior years the winners were announced immediately after the conclusion of voting. Subsequently, in March 2014, the results were announced with Nicole Aniston winner and Vanessa Veracruz runner-up.

However, forum users were quick to point out that the winners announced were not in line with preliminary votes shown before the contest ended, showing Vanessa Veracruz, a girl-girl performer winning. Speculation among users suggested Twistys.com of fixing votes to ensure two boy-girl models would win the contest and trip to Costa Rica for the "Treat of the Year" shooting. Subsequently, Twistys.com replaced Vanessa Veracruz as runner-up and announced Madison Ivy. Users suspected that when a girl-girl model received the most votes among site members, Twistys.com invalidated the results and selected Nicole Aniston and Madison Ivy (two boy-girl performers) as the winners. Vanessa Veracruz was exclusively a girl-girl performer. Accordingly, this was part of a shift within the company to transition the site to "harder" content, rather than the soft pornography for which Twistys.com had been known. Insiders reported that a VP declared that the "Twistys Treat of the Year" filming in Costa Rica would require boy-girl scenes.

Twistys.com faced backlash from subscribers, especially on the Members Forum. In response, Twistys.com subsequently took down the Members Forum at Twistys, leading several subscribers to cancel their membership. This led to calls by subscribers and Vanessa Veracruz to boycott Twistys.com and support ethical business behavior. In the end, Nicole Aniston and Madison Ivy remained "Treat of the Year" and runner-up, leaving many fans of the site disgruntled and leading to the resignation of Twistys production manager Rob who cited the controversy as the reason.

== Operations ==
Twistys.com, along with a large number of other well-known pornographic websites, is maintained and managed by MindGeek. The website ranks as the fourth most popular of MindGeek's network of porn sites. When Twistys was originally acquired, Mindgeek was then-known as Manwin.
The name change came shortly after managing partner, Fabian Thylman, stepped down. Thylman had first acquired the company after purchasing the assets from the original founders of Mansef. In 2013, he sold his stakes to Feras Antoon and David Tassillo, the senior management of the company. The company then merged with RedTube, a large porn tube site, thus creating MindGeek.

== Twistys Treats of the Year ==
Adult star Bree Olson was voted the first Twistys Treat of the Year in 2009.

Winners, who received the most member votes, were crowned Twistys Treat of the Year and received a $10,000 cash prize, a custom Rolex watch worth $5,000, all expensed paid shooting for Twistys.com, and one year of model promotions on Twistys.com.

Twistys has not announced a Treat of the Year since 2019.

Twistys Treat of the Year
2009: Bree Olson	2010: Heather Vandeven	2011: Emily Addison	2012: Taylor Vixen
2013: Mia Malkova	2014: Nicole Aniston	2015: Ariana Marie	2016: August Ames
2017: Riley Reid	2018: Elena Koshka	2019: Molly Stewart	

== Statistics ==
As of January 2020, Twistys.com has a traffic ranking of 36,392.

== Sub-Networks ==
There are currently ten websites operating under Twistys which feature thematically different aspects in terms of storylines and sexual preferences. They also vary between hard and softcore in order to cater to different tastes. Some examples include the following:

- Whengirlsplay.com
- Momknowsbest.com
- Twistyshard.com
- Nicolegraves.com
