= List of law schools in Austria =

This is a list of faculties of law in Austria.

- Karl-Franzens-University - Rechtswissenschaftlichen Fakultät
- University of Innsbruck - Rechtswissenschaftliche Fakultät
- Johannes Kepler University - Faculty of Law, Linz
- Universität Salzburg - Rechtswissenschaftliche Fakultät
- University of Vienna - Rechtswissenschaftliche Fakultät
