= Feras Antoon =

Canadian businessman

- Born: 29 June 1975 (age 51); Damascus, Syria
- Education: Concordia University
- Occupation: Businessman
- Known for: Co-owner, MindGeek
- Title: CEO, MindGeek
- Spouse: NicolesManos

Feras Antoon (Arabic: فراس انطون, romanized: Firas Antūn; born 29 June 1975) is a Syrian-Canadian-French pornographer, and the co-founder of Mindgeek, the world's largest pornography company, which runs sites including Pornhub and RedTube. He created his first porn website in the early 2000s before co-founding Brazzers, which specialized in the MILF segment of porn distribution. He and David Tassillo later bought Manwin (MindGeek, Aylo) from Fabian Thylmann.

== Early life ==
Feras Antoon was born on 29 June 1975 in the city of Damascus, Syria, before immigrating to Canada. A resident of Montreal, he graduated with an engineering degree from Montreal's Concordia University.

== Career ==
In the early 2000s, with four other recent Concordia engineering graduates, he created his first porn website for Mansef Productions. The company was run by Stéphane Manos, and Antoon would become his brother-in-law.

Their first porn company, Brazzers, was set up in about 2005 by Ouissam Youssef, Matt Keezer, Stephane Manos, and Feras Antoon with the company name being an allusion/homage to their mainly Middle Eastern origins, and their pronunciation of "Brothers". Brazzers focused on the sexualization of MILFs. According to Antoon, "At first, they focused on busty women, because the big tits niche was so cheap. They realized that the MILF niche – the older-women niche – is even bigger. And they became masters of the big-tit-MILF niche". Further expansion led to sites including YouPorn, before all the businesses were sold to German businessman Fabian Thylmann for an estimated $140 million.

In January 2011, commenting on paid and free ("tube") porn sites, Antoon said, "I personally have one or two memberships, and I still go to the tubes. I get my appetizer on the tubes, my main course on one of the sites."

Following his extradition from Belgium to Germany in 2012, on charges of tax evasion, Fabian Thylmann, the owner of Manwin (which changed its name to MindGeek in 2013 and Aylo in 2023) sold the company to its two senior managers, Antoon and COO David Tassillo, for a reported €73 million. Antoon was the CEO of Mindgeek, which in 2014 was described as a "porn monopoly". He resigned as CEO in 2022, but retained his shares in the company until its sale to Ethical Capital Partners.

By 2016, the Autorité des marchés financiers (AMF) in Montreal had executed search warrants and obtained cease-trade orders for 13 people, with allegations of insider trading including Antoon.

== Personal life ==
Antoon lives in Montreal, Canada. He is married to Nicole Manos, a Canadian of Greek descent. The couple have two sons. Nicole is the daughter of George Manos and Louise Laberge Manos (1952–2017). His brother Mark Antoon was a vice-president of Mindgeek. Antoon's mansion under construction in Ahuntsic-Cartierville burnt down in a suspected arson on 26 April 2021 after it was listed for $19.5 million. Ten months later, he made unsubstantiated claims that someone incited by "extremist religious groups" from the "darkest corners of the internet" was responsible for the destruction.
