= Johannes Kepler University Linz =

Public university in Linz, Austria

- Johannes Kepler Universität Linz
- Type: Public
- Established: 1966
- Vice-Chancellor: Stefan Koch
- Students: 27,000 (2025)
- Location: Linz, Upper Austria, Austria; 48°20′15″N 14°19′03″E
- Campus: Urban
- Website: www.jku.at

The Johannes Kepler University Linz (German: Johannes Kepler Universität Linz, short: JKU) is a public university in Austria. It is located in Linz, the capital of Upper Austria. It offers bachelor's, master's, diploma and doctoral degrees in business, engineering, law, science, social sciences and medicine.

As of 2026, the university reports it has about 27,000 students at the park campus in the northeast of Linz, with one out of nine students being from abroad. The university was the first in Austria to introduce an electronic student ID in 1998.

The university is the home of the Johann Radon Institute for Computational and Applied Mathematics (RICAM) of the Austrian Academy of Sciences.

== History ==
The JKU was established as the "College of Social Sciences, Economics and Business" (Hochschule für Sozial- und Wirtschaftswissenschaften) in 1966. The Faculty of Sciences and Engineering was established three years later and in 1975, the college was awarded university status and the Faculty of Law was integrated on campus. The university was named in honor of astronomer Johannes Kepler (1571–1630) who wrote his magnum opus harmonices mundi ("The Harmony of the world") in Linz during the early 17th century and taught mathematics at a school for the landed gentry (Adelichen Landt-Schuelen) near Linz. At present, the campus added the "JKU Science Park", additional buildings for science and engineering institutes. As of 2019 many new buildings were being built. The university reported it had 27,000 students as of April 2026.

== Campus ==
University rankings

Global – Overall
- ARWU World: 801–900 (2024)
- CWUR World: 986 (2024)
- QS World: 473 (2026)
- THE World: 401–500 (2025)

JKU's campus is located in the northeast of Linz, in the Auhof area of the St. Magdalena district. The university buildings are placed in a 36-hectare (90-acre) park centered around a pond.

=== Infrastructure ===
The campus is accessible by the Linz tram lines 1 and 2 and the express bus line 77. On weekdays, trams travel every five minutes and a trip to the city center (Hauptplatz) takes approximately 16 minutes.

The JKU is also located close to Austria's autobahn network at the Dornach exit on the A7 Mühlkreisautobahn (c. one kilometre or 1/2 mile). In anticipation of extending the campus, an additional autobahn exit, Auhof, is currently in the construction stages and is expected to better facilitate traffic, allowing a more direct route to the university.

A bicycle path in the north-east corner of the town located along the north side of the Danube river provides direct access to the university and helps to reduce traffic in the area.

=== Housing ===
Many larger dormitories are within walking distance of the university, such as the Julius Raab Heim, the WIST Haus, the Kepler Heim, the ESH and the KHG Heim. Several other dormitories are located in different parts of Linz, providing housing for more than 3,100 students in all of Linz.

Some of the dormitories become hotels during the summer holidays, most notably the Julius Raab Heim under the name Hotel Sommerhaus.

=== Management ===
The vice-chancellor and the Academic Senate are responsible for the university's management. There are several pro-vice-chancellors who are each assigned to specific task areas and who assist the vice-chancellor. The university board is an independent body that advises and counsels the vice-chancellor and the Academic Senate on management issues. Deans and faculty committees are responsible for management on a faculty level. Vice-chancellor and deans are elected for a four-year period whereas faculty committees are elected for a two-year period.

=== Faculties and degree programs ===
The Johannes Kepler University has four faculties with a total of 127 institutes.

==== Faculty of Social Sciences, Economics and Business (SoWi) ====
The Faculty of Social Sciences, Economics and Business is the oldest and largest faculty in terms of students and graduates. The faculty consists of 32 institutes and offers academic degrees e.g. in Economics and Business Administration, Business Informatics, Business and Education, Social Economics, Sociology and Statistics.

The faculty's abbreviation SoWi is derived from the German name of the faculty, Sozial- und Wirtschaftswissenschaftliche Fakultät.

==== Faculty of Engineering and Natural Sciences (TN) ====
The Faculty of Engineering and Natural Sciences was established in 1969 and initially offered degrees e.g. in Technical Mathematics, Computer Science and Technical Physics. Over time, degrees in Technical Chemistry, Mechatronics and Information Electronics were introduced.

Several master's degrees to specialize in the area of computer science, mathematics and physics, such as pervasive computing, industrial mathematics or biophysics are available. Doctorate degrees are offered in the areas of natural science and technical science.

The TN faculty consists of 51 distinctive institutes and the German name is Technisch-Naturwissenschaftliche Fakultät, hence the abbreviation TN or TNF.

The faculty includes the Research Institute for Symbolic Computation (RISC Linz), which focuses on the area of symbolic computation, including automated theorem proving and computer algebra. It is located in Schloß Hagenberg in Hagenberg near Linz in Austria. RISC was founded in 1987 under Bruno Buchberger and moved to Hagenberg in 1989. The chairman of RISC as of April 2026 is Carsten Schneider.

==== Faculty of Law (RE) ====
The Faculty of Law was officially established in 1975. Before that time period, law degrees were offered by the SoWi faculty, which was then theFaculty of Social Sciences, Economics, Business and Law. In addition to Diploma and doctorate degrees in law, the RE faculty offers a Bachelor's degree in Business Law in cooperation with the SoWi faculty. Law degrees are also offered via multimedia distance learning.

The abbreviation RE is derived from the first two letters of the faculty's name German name, Rechtswissenschaftliche Fakultät. At present, the RE faculty consists of 20 institutes.

==== Faculty of Medicine (MED) ====
The Faculty of Medicine was founded in 2014. A new MED-Campus is being built.

==== Interdisciplinary programs ====
The Leading Innovative Organizations program is a one-year master's program offered jointly by the institute for organization, the institute for leadershing and change management and the institute of innovative management. It aims to offer its students the skills required to establish, lead, and manage a successful, innovative, and sustainable organization.

The master's degree program in web sciences is divided into branches of study: social web, web art and design, web business and economy, web engineering as well as web and the law. It offers those with academic background in various fields a research-led expansion and in-depth look at fields relevant to the web such as technology, business, law, society, art and culture.

==== Distance learning ====
The JKU maintains several distance learning centers in Austria that offer degrees and courses at the German FernUniversität Hagen, the British Open University and JKU's own distance law degree program.

== Notable alumni ==
- Michaela Benthaus, first wheelchair user to travel to space
- Bernd Bergmair, majority owner of Mindgeek
- Christine Haiden, writer, editor and journalist

== Gallery ==
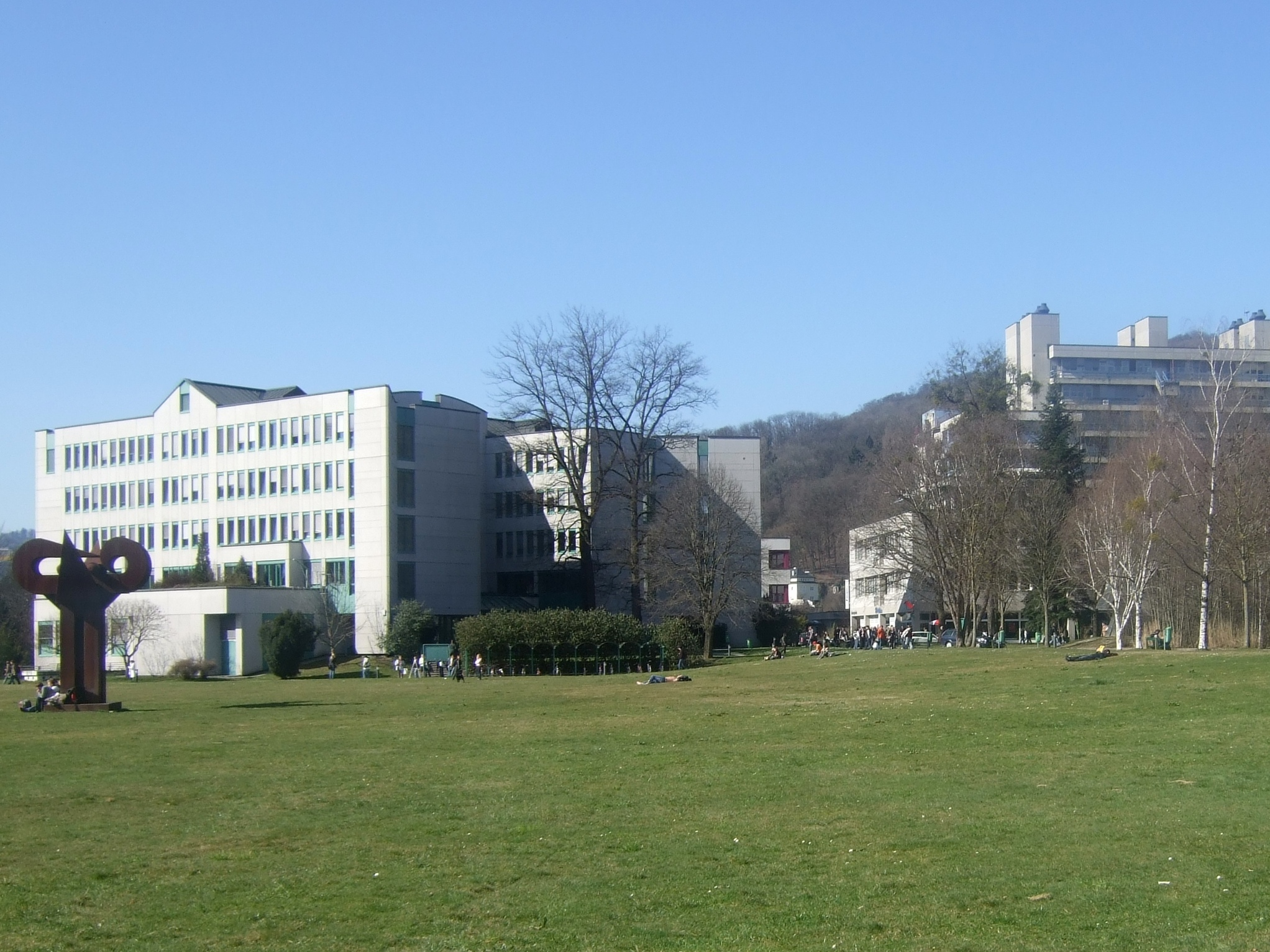
Management Center and other campus buildings

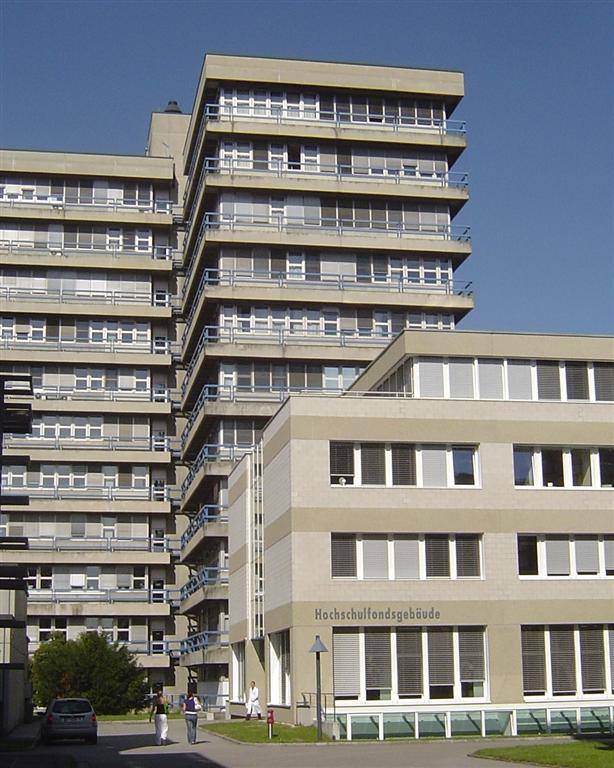
TNF Tower with HF building in the front

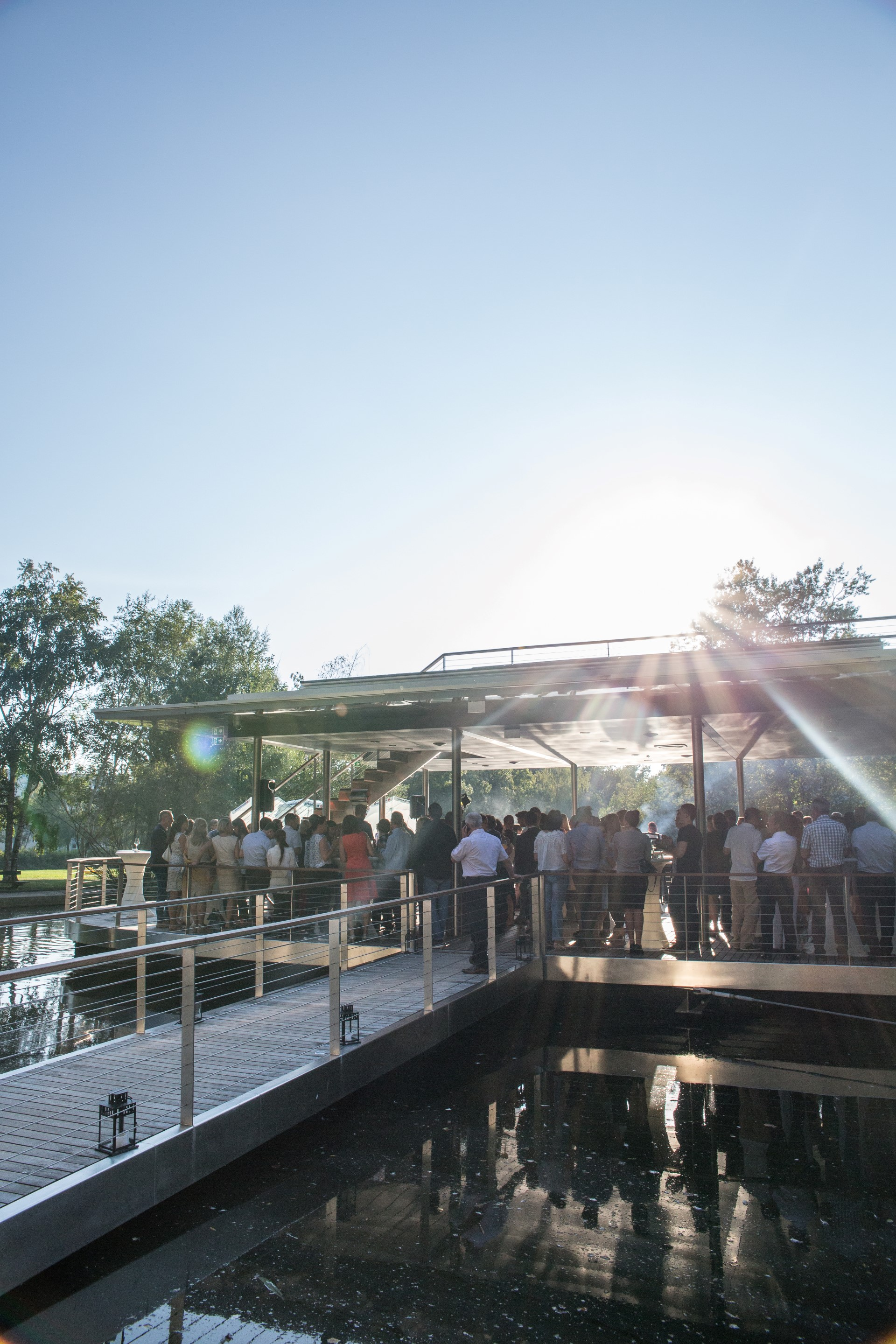
Teichwerk, a cafe/bar/restaurant at the pond

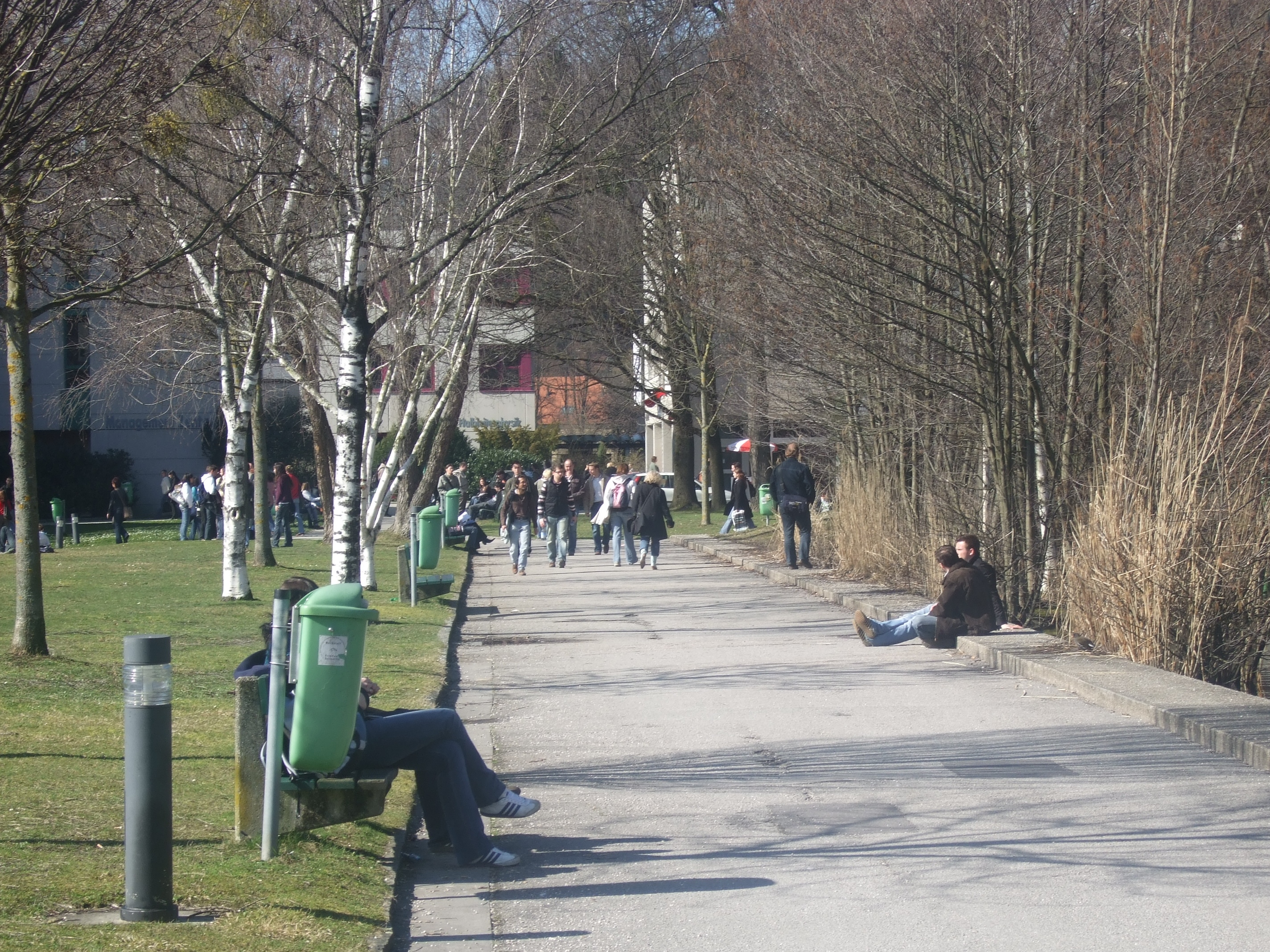
Students of the JKU on a walkway next to the pond

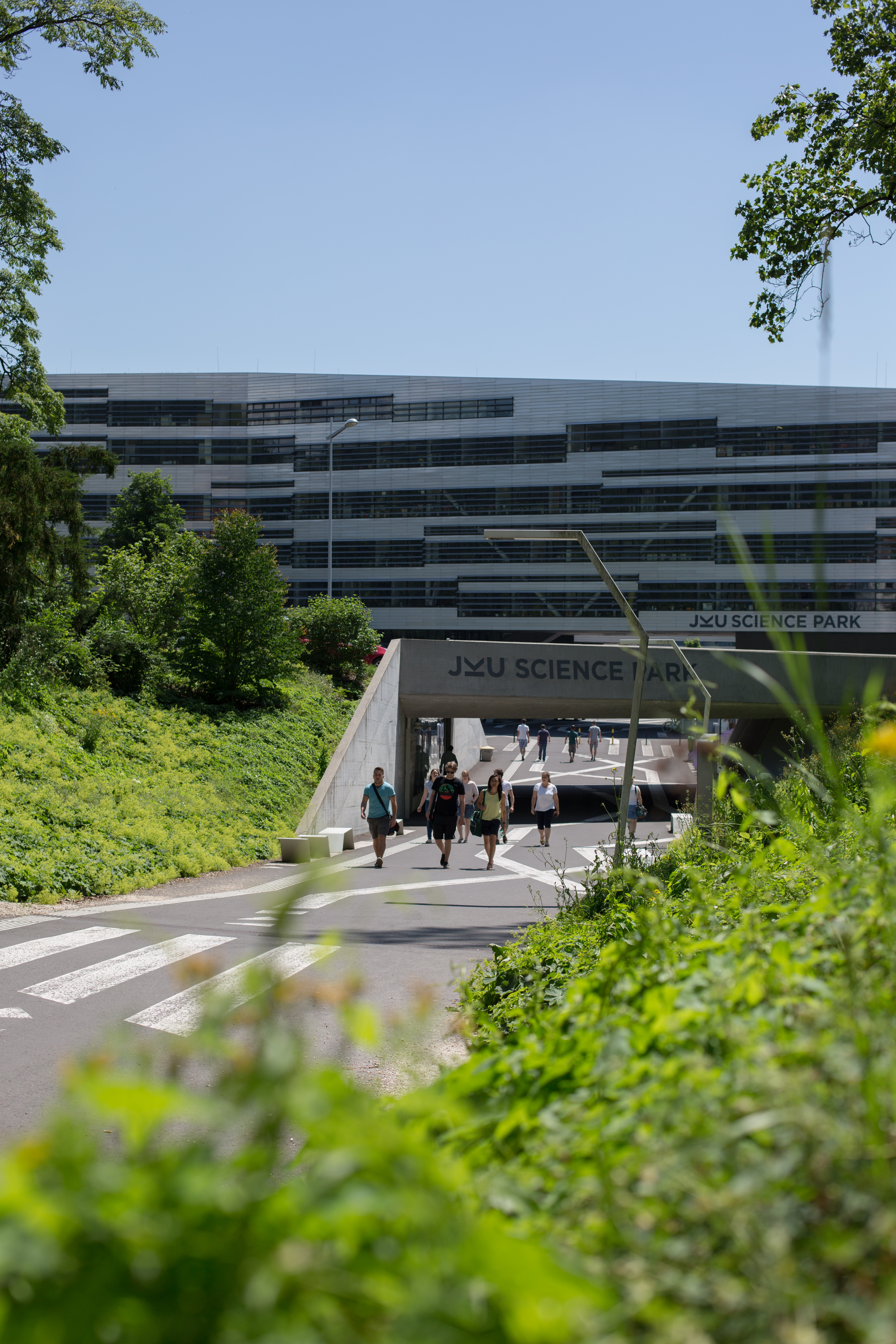
JKU Science Park

== See also ==
- List of early modern universities in Europe
