= Mofos =

Canadian pornographic production company

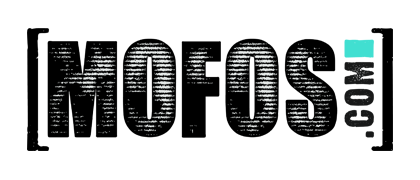
- Type: Subsidiary
- Industry: Pornography
- Genre: Reality pornography
- Founded: November 1, 2008; 17 years ago
- Founders: Brazzers
- Headquarters: Montreal, Quebec, Canada
- Area served: Worldwide
- Key people: Mani mj (CEO), David Tassilo (COO), Lenc Sterili (CEO)
- Products: Pornographic films
- Owner: Aylo
- Parent: Brazzers
- Website: www.mofos.com

Mofos is a Canadian pornographic production company focusing on reality pornography.

== About ==
The Mofos website was created by Brazzers in 2008. The goal was to create videos with simpler storylines, as opposed to Brazzers' videos. The videos would feature lesser-known pornographic actors who would be able to accurately embody the various roles specifically written for reality pornography. The Mofos website was eventually acquired by Manwin in 2010. The online network consists of twenty-two hardcore pornography websites (or sub-networks) along with five series. Mofos claimed to have a "global traffic ranking" of 6,946 as of October 2016.

== Sub-networks ==
The company's owner has stated that there are over twenty websites operating under the Mofos network. Each site follows different themes and storylines within the reality pornography genre. Themes may include: interracial pornography, public sex, legal-aged teenagers, mature women, etc. The sub-sites are named in order to be able to easily identify said themes without needing much research.

== Ownership and operations ==
Mofos is owned and operated by Aylo, another Internet pornography company. Mofos claims that its site and subsites are carefully run under the supervision of MindGeek so as to avoid all illegal activities.

Mindgeek was formerly known as Manwin. The name was changed shortly after managing partner, Fabian Thylman, stepped down. Thylman had first acquired the company after purchasing the assets from the original founders. In 2013, he sold his stakes to Feras Antoon and David Tassillo, the senior management of the company. The company then merged with Redtube, a large porn tube site, thus creating MindGeek.
