= Gay-for-pay =

Gay sex work performed by heterosexual people

Gay-for-pay describes male or female actors, pornographic stars, or other sex workers who profess to be heterosexual but who are paid to act or perform as homosexual professionally. The term has also applied to other professions and even companies trying to appeal to a gay demographic. The stigma of being gay or labeled as such has steadily eroded since the Stonewall riots began the modern American gay rights movement in 1969. Through the 1990s, mainstream movie and television actors have been more willing to portray homosexuality, as the threat of any backlash against their careers has lessened and society's acceptance of gay and lesbian people has increased. However, it has also become controversial in the 2020s as some argue it enables continuing homophobia within the entertainment industry while impeding gay actors from coming out and living authentically.

In the gay pornography industry, which uses amateurs as well as professional actors, the term gay-for-pay refers to actors who identify as straight but who engage in same-sex sexual activities for money or sexual gain. Some actors who are actually gay or bisexual will be marketed as straight to appeal to the "allure of the unattainable", because straight men (or those newly coming out) are virgins to sex with other men; scholar Camille Paglia declared that "Seduction of straight studs is a highly erotic motif in gay porn."

== Pornography ==
=== Men ===
Many gay or bisexual men who star in gay porn films may wish to be identified publicly as heterosexual for personal or professional reasons.

Some straight actors have started acting in gay porn only to be accused of being gay while others' first step was to strictly do solo masturbation or muscle exhibition scenes. The higher pay scale and profile within a production often leads to group scenes where a straight actor only "tops." A "top" actor will often be sought as a bottom and the debut is often treated as a notable event or even its own release.

=== Women ===
A striking and underexamined feature of the mainstream heterosexual pornography industry is that virtually all female performers, regardless of their stated sexual identity, are expected to perform sexual acts with other women. This expectation does not have a male equivalent: male performers in straight-targeted productions are not expected to perform with other men. This asymmetry is especially conspicuous given the industry's own terminology: the label "bisexual" in pornographic production and tagging conventions refers specifically to content in which a male performer has sex with both men and women, the marked and commercially distinct case, while content featuring female performers having sex with both men and women goes unlabelled as such, despite being effectively the norm.

Empirically, female pornography performers identify as bisexual at substantially higher rates than comparable women outside the industry. Griffith et al. (2012) found that women in pornography were significantly more likely to identify as bisexual than a matched non-performer sample, though the study was unable to determine whether this identification preceded entry into the industry or emerged from it. Griffith et al. propose that the industry may function as a facilitator of sexual fluidity, providing structured opportunities and financial incentives for same-sex behavior in a context where such behavior is normalized. Drawing on Diamond's (2008) research suggesting that women's sexual attractions are more responsive to situational factors than men's. Griffith et al. acknowledge, however, that examining this hypothesis rigorously would require longitudinal access to performers that has not yet been achieved.

This question has received surprisingly little systematic attention. No study has specifically investigated whether female performers' high rates of bisexual identification reflect pre-existing identity, situational development, or the industry's labelling practices. Moorman (2024) notes that dismissals of girl-on-girl performance as purely mercenary fail to account for this asymmetry: if same-sex performance were simply a financial transaction with no relationship to underlying attraction, it would be unclear why this pattern is so strongly sex-differentiated—that is, why female performers engage in it near-universally while male performers in equivalent productions do not.

== Sex workers ==
In the sex worker industry, the term may also be applied to straight people of either gender (including "male escorts") who have sexual contact or scenes with a client or another sex worker of the same gender. Although sexual contact is often involved, sex scenes or solo scenes (like masturbating to climax) or even a BDSM scene for the client's stimulation can take place. Sexual arousal without direct sexual contact may also occur in such niche trade as muscle worship. As in porn work, a gay identity is not necessary to make money from gay clients and consumers.

== Go-go dancers ==
Go-go dancing originated in the 1960s. It was eventually appropriated by burlesque and striptease establishments, which became known as "go-go bars". Many gay clubs had male go-go dancers, called go-go boys during the period 1965–1968. After that, few gay clubs had go-go dancers until a resurgence in the late 1980s, when go-go dancing again became fashionable, and has remained so ever since.

"Go-go dancers" who perform at night clubs, special parties, circuit parties or rave dances wearing colorful bright costumes (which may include battery operated lights, fire sticks, or a snake) can also be called performance art dancers or box dancers. Large circuit parties and gay clubs often have very attractive go-go boys of all sexualities who will allow patrons to touch and rub them but only for tips. Some criticize the practice of employing straight dancers to perform erotically for gay audiences when gay performers are available.

== Film and television ==
In film and television, the term "pinkface" is the use of straight actors to play LGBT roles or characters. Anna King of Time Out likens "pinkface" to blackface. Pinkface differs from straightwashing, which is the erasure of gay characters and themes from stories in film and television.

Parts of the gay community have expressed concerns about the use of straight actors to play gay characters, a practice that has also been nicknamed "gay for pay" in the acting industry. This occurs in films and shows such as Call Me by Your Name (straight actors Armie Hammer and Timothée Chalamet), Brokeback Mountain (Heath Ledger and Jake Gyllenhaal), Modern Family (starring Eric Stonestreet), Brooklyn Nine-Nine (starring Andre Braugher), Will & Grace (starring Eric McCormack), Philadelphia (starring Tom Hanks), Capote (starring Philip Seymour Hoffman) and Milk (with Sean Penn as gay rights activist-political leader Harvey Milk).

Controversy has arisen from this practice due to nominations and wins of awards from these roles, particularly for gay men. For example, since Hanks' win for Philadelphia in 1993, only two openly gay actors have been nominated for either Best Actor or Best Supporting Actor at the Academy Awards: Nigel Hawthorne, for playing the heterosexual King George III in 1994; and Ian McKellen, for playing gay director James Whale in 1998 and the unspecified wizard Gandalf in 2001. Neither man won, nor has an openly gay man been nominated since. Meanwhile, sixteen straight actors have been nominated for gay roles, with five winning. The same has also applied to television, where Jim Parsons remains the only openly gay actor to be nominated for or win an Emmy Award in the lead acting categories; meanwhile, the heterosexual Eric McCormack was nominated and won for his portrayal of Will Truman on Will & Grace, which remains the only nomination for a gay male character in these categories.

The LGBT community has also raised concerns about when actors in pinkface have used negative or harmful stereotypes in their portrayals of gay characters. Dennis Lim states that the depictions of gays in mainstream film typically include the "gay joke", in which LGBT people are depicted to create humor by depicting gay men pejoratively as a "daisy, a fairy, a nonce, a pansy, a swish," or showing lesbian woman as "butch." The performances of heterosexual actors Sacha Baron Cohen in the 2009 film Brüno and James Corden in the 2020 film The Prom have created controversy for this, with one critic describing the Baron Cohen film as an attempt to "...mak[e] fun of the queer community." Other films have capitalized on creating a homosexual panic that plays on heterosexual people's fears of experiencing sexual advances from LGBT people. The 1980 film Cruising created controversy due to its plot of a straight cop, played by straight actor Al Pacino, going undercover to infiltrate a gay nightclub, and its negative depictions of gay men that seem to justify a gay panic defense from Pacino's character.

In a 2018 op-ed for The Guardian, gay writer Gary Nunn addressed the issue stating that while he understands wanting to "redress the balance" of gay actors "told by Hollywood to stay in the closet if they ever want to play a straight role" and straight white men having more power and influence and access to better jobs than other people, "to demand that only gay actors play gay roles is not the way to correct an inequality." He believes that "in a world where gay actors are still denied straight roles, it'll just lead to typecasting of gay actors - the very thing they're wanting to escape. Gay actors want a diversity of roles just like straight actors do." In 2021, actress Kate Winslet stated that she knew of at least four actors who remained closeted due to homophobia within the entertainment industry, stating "It's painful. Because they fear being found out. And that's what they say. 'I don't want to be found out.'... You would not believe how widespread it is."

== Popular culture ==
- The Fluffer, film about a fictional gay-for-pay actor
- The Real World: Las Vegas (2011) featured Dustin Zito, a former gay-for-pay actor

== Straight-for-pay ==
A term that is derivative of "gay-for-pay" is the partly tongue-in-cheek term "straight-for-pay," which describes gay men who have sex with women for pay. The term was coined to describe the film Shifting Gears: A Bisexual Transmission, due to gay porn stars Cameron Marshall and Blake Riley being featured in heterosexual scenes. Other notable examples of gay porn stars going "straight-for-pay" are Steven Daigle and Arpad Miklos, the latter of whom received a great deal of criticism for his scene on the site Straight Guys for Gay Eyes (SG4GE). SG4GE's company principal Jake Cruise defended the scene, stating that it was a "winning idea" to portray a "masculine gay man exploring straight sex" because "I've always loved to push boundaries and press buttons with my work."

In August 2018, the gay male pornographic website Men.com released its first scene featuring MMF bisexual porn titled "The Challenge." Arad Winwin, the star of the scene and a self-identified gay man, faced backlash from fans for acting in the scene, with some fans accusing him of being straight or of having "converted" to heterosexual or bisexual. Winwin told the gay website Str8UpGayPorn that "I'm a gay man...This was only a job, and it was nothing more. Nothing personal. I was working, and it was like any other scene I've done."

== See also ==
- Heteroflexibility
- Latent homosexuality
- Straightwashing
- Gay chicken
