= Xtube =

Former pornographic video hosting and social networking site

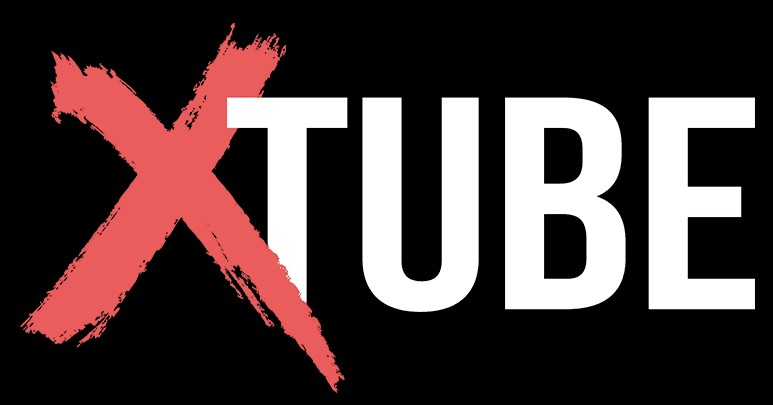
- Company type: Private
- Website type: Pornographic video sharing
- Available in: English
- Founded: March 12, 2006; 20 years ago
- Dissolved: September 5, 2021; 5 years ago
- Headquarters: Toronto, Ontario, Canada
- Owner: MindGeek (now Aylo)
- Industry: Sex
- Website: xtube.com
- Registration: Optional
- Current status: Dissolved

Xtube was a pornographic video hosting service and social networking site based in Toronto, Ontario. It was established in 2006 and is notable for being the first adult community site to allow users to upload and share adult videos. Xtube was not a producer of pornography, instead it provided a platform for content uploaded by users. User-submitted content included pornographic videos, webcam models, pornographic photographs, and erotic literature, and incorporated social networking features.

== History ==
Founded in 2006 by Ontario, Canada-based Webnovas Technologies, having been acquired between 2006 and 2010 by the then managing partner of MindGeek (then known as Manwin) Fabian Thylmann. It was part of the Pornhub NETWORK, which is a group of interlinked pornographic video sharing websites, most of which are owned by MindGeek (now known as Aylo).

On July 5, 2021, Xtube announced closure was scheduled for September 5 of the same year.

== Overview ==
The website allowed visitors to view pornographic videos from a number of categories, including professional and amateur pornography. Users could take advantage of several features, including sharing videos on social media websites and liking or disliking them. Users could also optionally register a free Xtube account, which additionally allowed them to post comments, download videos and add videos to their favorites, as well as upload videos themselves. To combat the proliferation of illegal content, users were encouraged to flag videos they deem inappropriate, which were immediately reviewed by the Xtube team and removed if they violated the website's terms of service.

XTube stated that it had over 9 million registered users, and it had an Alexa Internet global traffic rank of 871, and a United States traffic rank of 705 (as of April 2018).

== Features ==
Xtube provided various pornographic videos, photos, and erotic stories grouped under categories catering to specific fetishes or sexual preferences. Users uploaded content to a series of set categories. The most popular category being "amateur". Xtube also contained several social networking features. Users had detailed profiles incorporating their profile picture, cover photos and gender, as well as personal information in an 'about me' section that contained turn ons, turn offs, favorite music, hobbies, fantasies, interests and ideal partners. Content included a commenting and rating system, and users could interact by adding others as a "friend" or subscribing to another's content. Privacy settings allowed users to make various parts of the account visible only to select individuals, filter private messages, and block certain requests. Users could also verify their identity by submitting a photo of themselves with their username, which conferred a verified a mark upon their profile and the user's videos.

Xtube generated revenues partly through advertising and partly through sharing revenue with amateur performers who sold their material on the site. It provided a micro-payment platform enabling amateur producers to receive 42.5% of the net profit for the sale of their work.

Other features that were offered on Xtube included live cams, watching and selling premium videos and photos, uploading free content, and DVD subscriptions.

The site also allowed users to interact through comments, and material on the site which was organized using user generated tags. Registration was optional, and some content could have been accessed free of charge without requiring registration.

== In popular culture ==
Xtube was mentioned on The Late Show with Stephen Colbert on January 18, 2017, by guest Billy Eichner. Eichner said that he would be performing MMA after the inauguration of Donald Trump and that it would be uploaded to Xtube.

== See also ==
- Comparison of video services
- Internet pornography
- List of online video platforms
- Porn 2.0
