= Bisexual pornography =

Pornography depicting bisexuality

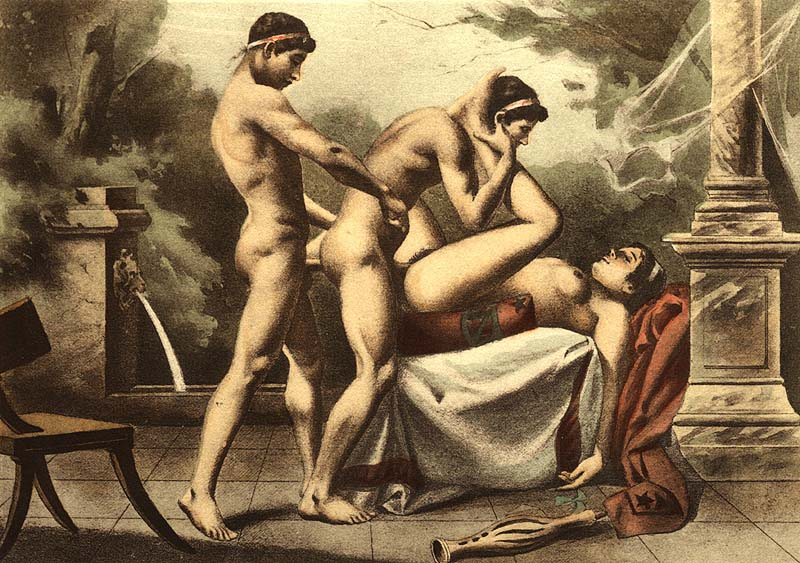
Painting by Édouard-Henri Avril depicts two men and a woman having a threesome.

Bisexual pornography is a genre of pornography that most typically depicts men and at least one woman who all perform sex acts on each other. While a sex scene involving women and only one man who all perform sex acts on each other might occasionally be identified or labeled as bisexual, it typically is not labeled that way.

== History ==
Representations of bisexual eroticism have been found in ancient Etruscan tomb paintings that feature homosexual activity combined with heterosexual activity.

== Pornographic film industry ==
In the first half of the twentieth century, some stag films presented bisexual content. Polissons et galipettes features several French examples, primarily L'heure du thé and Madame Butterfly (both c. 1925), which feature acts performed between both men and women. Kenneth Tynan documents many examples, including the French The Chiropodist from the 1920s and the American A Stiff Game (which features a rare interracial male-male pairing).

Bisexual pornography began to develop as a genre in the early to mid-1980s. While bisexual content featuring lesbianism had been prevalent during the 1960s and 1970s, bisexual content featuring male homosexuality was first introduced by major pornographic studios in the early 1980s. Paul Norman was one of the earliest directors to gain a reputation for creating bisexual films, with his "Bi and Beyond" series debuting in 1988. Content featuring male bisexuality has been a growing trend since the advent of internet pornography. However the genre remains a very small proportion of the pornographic DVD market; for example at porn retailer HotMovies.com, there are only 655 bisexual titles out of a catalogue of more than 90,000 films. Bisexual DVDs sell much better online than in adult video stores, possibly due to customers in stores feeling embarrassed to buy them. Most bisexual pornography is made by small production companies rather than the major studios. Actors are mostly amateur; any well-known actors in bisexual porn tend to be from the gay pornography industry. The sex columnist Violet Blue states that bisexual pornography usually features gay male actors who are straight-for-pay. Blue says that many bisexual productions suffer from poor casting, lack of enthusiasm from homophobic directors, and lackluster performances because "all too many bisexual videos feature two men having sex with each other while desperately trying not to enjoy the female participants."

The market for bisexual pornography is not completely understood. Viewers include self-identified bisexuals, but a larger viewership may be self-identified heterosexual men who are curious about sex between men. Many viewers are also heterosexual women who enjoy gay male pornography. Although including heterosexual content, bisexual pornography is often considered a "gay" genre by the pornographic industry and many of its viewers are gay men. Bisexual pornography is often placed near the gay section in adult video stores, since many consumers are gay men. As the genre has developed, it has become increasingly associated with the gay male pornographic industry. By the 2000s, bisexual productions used less scenes with women together and bisexual scenes now frequently resemble gay scenes with heterosexual content added.

Pornography featuring two or more men and a woman (e.g., gang bang or double penetration pornography) is generally classified as "straight pornography" as long as "there is little to no contact between the men" in order to "straighten" what otherwise could be a homoerotic encounter. Only when the men have sex with each other is the scene considered bisexual pornography. Bisexual pornography is generally not marketed to heterosexual men. According to the writer Jeffrey Escoffier, bisexual pornography is usually considered a gay genre.

Male performers in heterosexual porn who have appeared in bisexual porn, have had their sexuality questioned and have been stigmatized due to homophobia, and have been accused by the gay community of being in denial about their sexual orientation; while male performers in gay porn who have appeared in bisexual porn have been accused of being heteronormative.

In August 2018, MindGeek's gay pornographic website Men.com created controversy by releasing its first scene featuring MMF bisexual porn, sparking a discussion over whether bisexual porn belongs on a gay porn website. In reaction to the controversy, MindGeek decided to stop featuring bisexual pornography on Men.com and created a separate bisexual website instead called WhyNotBi.com.

By 2019, bisexual pornography was a fast-growing genre. In 2021, "bisexual male" was Pornhub's second top gaining category worldwide and bisexual videos were viewed more often by women than by men.

Jim Powers, a director of bisexual pornographic films for the studio BiPhoria, says that stigma exists against bisexual pornography. Powers says that the genre is rapidly increasing in popularity, however prejudice exists in the industry against heterosexual men who appear in bisexual pornography, women who work with bisexual or gay men may be shunned due to perceived risk of HIV infection, and gay viewers may object to gay performers working with women because heterosexual sex is perceived as reinforcing a "heteronormative paradigm". Powers says that homophobic straight agents try to stop straight men from appearing in bisexual pornography, because gay sex is considered "verboten", while many gay and bisexual performers have stopped identifying as either gay or straight because the genre can be a "battlefield" due to gay viewers who want to "keep their gay men ‘pure’ and not to mix with women."

AVN research suggests that both men and women are increasingly drawn to bisexual pornography because it caters to diverse sexual fantasies. For men, the appeal often comes from male-male-female scenes that combine threesome fantasies with an interest in male-male interaction, while for women, bisexual pornography is often appealing because male-male-female scenes highlight intimacy and interaction between men while still including male-female sex, allowing viewers to enjoy emotional connection, sexual tension, and a wider range of dynamics than traditional heterosexual content.

== Notable directors and performers ==
- François Sagat
- Kurt Lockwood
- Danny Wylde
- Sharon Kane
- Chi Chi LaRue
- Shy Love
- Paul Norman (director)
- Ona Zee

== See also ==
- Gay pornography
- List of LGBT-related films
- Pornographic film

== Bibliography ==
- Marjorie Garber: Bisexuality and the Eroticism of Everyday Life (Routledge, 2000). ISBN 0-415-92661-0
