= Gay chicken =

Party game

Gay chicken is a party game where two or more ostensibly heterosexual participants engage in escalating same-sex intimacy until one backs out of the competition, with the winner being the participant who dares to go the furthest with the sexual activity. The game makes use of the discomfort, awkwardness, or embarrassment the heterosexual players feel towards engaging in same-sex sexual behaviour to provoke laughter from onlookers or participants. The game has been observed to have been used as a form of hazing or initiation rite in the military and at universities or clubs, where new recruits are forced to participate in the game to degrade them, although this has been decreasing over time due to the destigmatization of homosexuality.
