= Eurocreme =

Gay pornographic film company

- Type: Private
- Industry: Gay pornography
- Founded: 2002
- Founder: Max Lincoln
- Headquarters: London, England
- Products: Internet pornography and pornographic films
- Website: eurocreme.com

Eurocreme is a European company based in London, England, that specializes in the production and distribution of gay pornographic films, generally featuring twinks, although it has also released a number of series devoted to men of more diverse appearance.

== History ==
The company was founded by director Max Lincoln, whose first film was DreamBoy (2002). In 2004, the company set up a joint venture with Netherlands-based distributor Eurocreme BV, which used the "Eurocreme Sales" brand to market a portfolio of mostly bareback-sex movies from AVI Production, Prague, released under various brand names.

In late 2008, both companies split their affairs but still are partnered in a United States-based distribution joint venture, Euro Media Distributors.

In 2009, Eurocreme partnered with Alphamalemedia.com, a UK-based muscle studio owned by porn star Trojan Rock. This partnership enabled the company to offer a large portfolio of product to appeal to a wide audience.

In April 2010, Eurocreme announced that it had signed a boy band named Boy Banned. This announcement sparked widespread speculation that Eurocreme was adopting a diversification strategy.

== Production ==
Best known for the films directed by Lincoln, Simon Booth, Marc Reardon and Maxwell B, Eurocreme produces eleven separate brands. Of these, the flagship remains the "Boy" series, most recently "CountryBoy" and "DirtyBoy". Eurocreme's other brands include the series Rudeboiz, which shows more intense gay sex between rough British young men, known as chavs. Eurocreme has also released a number of titles under the "Indieboyz" label, devoted to sex between young men styled in the indie-pop fashion popular in the UK. Performers in the "Hung Ladz" brand have larger-than-average penises. The company has branched into mainstream film making with the release of VGL – Hung!, directed by Maxwell B.

== Websites ==
The company owns and operates a number of free and commercial websites, including:

- eurocreme.com
- eurocremestore.com
- eurocreme.tv
- rudeboiz.com
- clubeurocreme.com

== Brands ==
It various brands include:

- Bulldog Red
- Bulldog XXX
- Butt Sluts
- Dads Fucks Lads
- DirtyLadz
- DreamBoy
- Eurocremies
- First Crush
- Garcons XXX
- Hung Ladz
- Indie Boyz
- Porn Academy
- Rudeboiz
- Str8Boiz
- Troy XXX

== Notable performers ==
- Kai Cruz
- Matt Hughes
- Cameron Jackson
- Will Jamieson
- JP Dubois
- Andy O'Neill
- Ashley Ryder
- Alex Stevens
- Mason Wyler
- Dave London

== See also ==
- List of film production companies
- List of pornographic movie studios
