= Too Much Media =

Too Much Media is a Freehold, New Jersey–based proprietary software company that created and maintains the NATS, Carma and Sparta software packages. According to the corporate website, it was founded in 2003 by John Albright, Fabian Thylmann and Charles Berrebbi.

== Products ==
The best known Too Much Media product is the package NATS, which stands for "Next-generation Administration management & Tracking System". The software is used to power the back-end tasks of affiliate programs.

== Alleged security breach ==
Towards the end of 2007, TMM was the subject of a widely reported security breach. The company said the breach did not result in the disclosure of credit card information.

USA Today also did a report on the issue, saying the breach was first exposed by an internet blog called In Corruption We Trust, run by Keith Kimmel.

== Award nominations ==
- 2010 XBIZ Award Nominee – Company of the Year

== Awards ==
- 2006 XBIZ Award – Solution Provider of the Year
- 2009 XBIZ Award – Software Company of the Year
- 2011 XBIZ Award – Software Company of the Year

In 2006, NATS and MPA3 competed for the XBIZ Award in the Solution Providers category, but a tie was declared after each of the two products received 4.3325 points on average.
