= Aylo =

Canadian pornography company

Coordinates: 45°29′50.0″N 73°39′23.4″W

- Formerly: Mansef (2004–2010); Manwin (2010–2013); MindGeek (2013–2023)
- Type: Private
- Industry: Pornography; Information technology
- Founded: June 2004; 22 years ago (as Mansef)
- Founders: Stephane Manos; Ouissam Youssef; Fabian Thylmann
- Headquarters: Montreal, Quebec, Canada
- Number of locations: 6 offices (2026)
- Area served: Worldwide
- Products: Pornographic Media
- Production output: Pornographic film
- Brands: Brazzers; Pornhub; RedTube; YouPorn; Tube8; Xtube; Digital Playground; Men.com; Mofos; Nutaku; Reality Kings; Sean Cody; TransAngels; Twistys; WhyNotBi.com
- Services: Content delivery; online advertising; streaming media
- Revenue: ▼US$460 million (2021)
- Owner: Ethical Capital Partners
- Number of employees: ~1,400 (2016)
- Subsidiaries: Aylo USA Inc.; Aylo Holdings S.A.R.L. (Formerly; MindGeek S.A.R.L.); Aylo Cy Holdings Ltd; Aylo Global Entertainment Inc.; Aylo Global Entertainment (Europe) Limited; Aylo USA Incorporated (Formerly; MindGeek USA Incorporated); Aylo Billing US Corp (Formerly; MG Billing US Corp); Aylo Billing Ltd; Aylo Freesites Ltd Formerly; MG Freesites Ltd); Aylo Premium Ltd; MG Freesites Ltd; MG Content RT Limited; Toqon, LLC.
- Website: aylo.com

Aylo (formerly known as MindGeek) is a Canadian multinational pornographic conglomerate owned by private equity firm Ethical Capital Partners. It is primarily involved in internet pornography, operating a number of video sharing websites (including platforms such as Pornhub, RedTube, Tube8, and YouPorn), and pornographic film studios such as Brazzers, Digital Playground, Men.com, Reality Kings, Sean Cody, and WhyNotBi.com, among others. Aylo's headquarters are located in Montreal, Quebec, Canada, but the company's corporate structure is divided among entities domiciled in a number of other countries (including tax havens such as Curaçao and Luxembourg).

The company is one of the largest distributors of online pornography, to the extent that it has been accused of having a monopoly position (with 3 out of the 10 most popular online pornography sites being owned by the company). In 2013, a spokesperson for the company stated that its properties were among the top five users of internet bandwidth in the world.

The company has been subject to a number of lawsuits and filed litigation against its competitors. They were sued in California for hosting non-consensual pornography produced by GirlsDoPorn, on allegations of coercing women into recorded performances under false pretenses. In January 2021, a class action lawsuit making similar claims was launched in Montreal for anyone who had pornography photos and videos, some of which may have been taken when they were underage, shared on its websites without their consent, since 2007. The lawsuit stated that the company knowingly did not "investigate or question its business partner regarding the mounting evidence of sex trafficking". In February 2021, a U.S.-based civil class action lawsuit was launched against the company on behalf of child sex trafficking victims whose child sexual abuse material was uploaded to Pornhub. On 21 December 2023, Aylo agreed to pay a fine of $1.8 million plus additional compensation to GirlsDoPorn victims, and to have an independent party assess their content moderation processes for three years.

== History ==
=== Origin and merger ===
In the late 1990s, German Fabian Thylmann created NATS (Next-Generation Affiliate Tracking Software), which was used for marketing pornography across different websites. Mansef was funded by Concordia University graduates Stephane Manos and Ouissam Youssef (Mansef a portmanteau of the two's surnames) in 2004 as the holding company for various "thumbnail gallery post" websites and an affiliate network. It later launched Brazzers and a porn production company among various other pay sites.

In 2006, Thylmann sold his shares in the company that controlled NATS and used the proceeds to purchase the Privat Amateure website. Matt Keezer started Pornhub in 2007 under Interhub in which Mansef was also a partner. Mansef was run as a familial business with several of the company managers being related to each other; Manos, Youssef and Keezer later wanted to sell the companies, looking to move onto other ventures. Between 2006 and 2010, Thylmann bought three more websites: MyDirtyHobby, Webcams, and Xtube. The domain name manwin.com was first registered in August 2007.

In March 2010, Thylmann bought the assets of Mansef and Interhub, and merged the properties into a new entity called Manwin. Thylmann also bought WebCams.com in a separate deal during the same period.

=== Website acquisitions ===
Manwin went on an acquisition spree of other popular pornographic entities. In June 2010, Manwin opened non-adult video sharing website Videobash.com (now defunct). In September 2010, Manwin acquired EuroRevenue, which owned various niche pornography sites. In November 2010, Manwin introduced celebrity news website Celebs.com (now defunct). In December 2010, Manwin entered into a partnership with Wicked Pictures to manage Wicked Pictures' paysites. The 2010 Manwin purchases accounted for US$130 million in debt. In 2011, the company raised US$362 million in financing from 125 secret investors, including Fortress Investment Group, JPMorgan Chase, and Cornell University.

In May 2011, Manwin acquired the pornographic video sharing website YouPorn. In June 2011, Manwin bought all adult related assets of Carsed Marketing Incorporated, including Twistys, Twistys Cash Affiliate Program, GayTube, SexTube, and TrannyTube. Manwin also created 3DXSTAR in a partnership with Funky Monkey Productions. In November 2011, Manwin became an operating partner of Playboy, managing the brand's online and entertainment business Playboy Plus Entertainment, which operates a number of television channels and online services based in the UK and Benelux. Manwin also launched Legendary Stats, a service that aggregates multiple affiliate programs and is targeted at affiliate site operators with large traffic volumes.

In January 2012, Manwin signed a deal to acquire the assets of the American pornographic movie studio Digital Playground. In April 2012, Manwin and Miami-based RK Netmedia Inc. filed a merger notification jointly authorized by Manwin and Reality Kings with the Austrian Federal Competition Authority. In September 2012, Manwin completed the acquisition. Company documents show that following the deal in the autumn, RK Holdings gave a Dublin company, Manwin Content RK, the right to use thousands of its pornography movies. In June 2012, Manwin launched Babes.com for its "glamcore" network.

In March 2013, MindGeek's co-owner Feras Antoon and his brother Mark Antoon were cited alongside the CEO of gaming technology giant Amaya Inc. and various of its own senior officers and stakeholders. The Quebec Market Authority, the province's market regulator that is somewhat equivalent to the U.S. SEC, investigated Amaya's executives for trading on privileged information. According to the charges, some MindGeek executives were found to have benefited from the leak of information, although they were not major players in the insider trading ring.

In July 2013, Manwin filed a merger notification with the Austrian Competition Authority to acquire RedTube.com. During the summer of 2013, Manwin / MindGeek acquired all of RedTube properties from Hong Kong–based Bright Imperial Ltd. for an undisclosed sum. In December 2013, the domain name RedTube8.xxx was also transferred to MindGeek after a trademark dispute.

=== Rebranding as MindGeek ===
MindGeek logo from 2013 to 2023

In October 2013, Thylmann sold his stake in Manwin, after facing tax evasion charges, to the senior management of the company, composed of Feras Antoon and David Tassilo, for $100 million, and later in the same month the company's name was changed to MindGeek. This took place as Manwin and RedTube, a large porn tube site not in its network, merged.

Playboy CEO Scott Flanders described the 2011 partnership with MindGeek as "the biggest mistake I've made at the company," saying that "Playboy should not have association with being in the sex-act business." In the spring of 2014, Playboy took back control of Playboy.com "at significant expense", although MindGeek still retained control of Playboy TV and Playboy Plus, and MindGeek still owns the Spice Networks TV channels, which were also bought from Playboy.

In December 2014, MindGeek announced they had signed a deal to manage the online assets of Really Useful Ltd., some of which include the websites BDSM.xxx, Casting.xxx, Czech.xxx, DaneJones.com, Fake Taxi, Lesbea.com, MassageRooms.com, Mature.xxx, Mom.xxx, Orgasms.xxx, PublicAgent.com, PublicSex.xxx, Teen.xxx, and Tubes.xxx.

In April 2015, Playboy Plus and M7 Group formed a partnership to launch Reality Kings TV in Benelux and Central and Eastern Europe on satellite TV services. In May 2015, MindGeek signed a distribution deal with Pulse Distribution, one of the largest distributors of adult entertainment, to distribute content from MindGeek's movie studios, including content from Brazzers and Digital Playground, and DVDs from Babes.com, Men.com, Mofos and Reality Kings. In October 2015, MindGeek acquired ExtremeTube, SpankWire, KeezMovies. These sites are interlinked in network called Spankwire Sites in similar fashion as the Pornhub Network.

In April 2018, MindGeek started accepting the Verge cryptocurrency as payment for their various services.

In December 2020, a Financial Times exposé was published, listing Bernd Bergmair as the main owner of MindGeek. "Free porn" websites have shrunk profit margins; as of 2020 Aylo (MindGeek) has about 25% profit margin. "MindGeek essentially also owns most of the porn industry."

In June 2022, the company confirmed the resignation of its CEO, Feras Antoon, and its COO, David Tassillo.

On 16 March 2023, MindGeek was acquired by Ethical Capital Partners, an Ottawa-based private equity firm. This acquisition came a day after Netflix debuted the documentary Money Shot: The Pornhub Story, which looks at the controversies involving Pornhub.

=== Rebranding as Aylo ===
In August 2023, MindGeek announced it was rebranding as Aylo; the company stated that the rebranding "comes in response to the need for a fresh start and a renewed commitment to innovation, diverse and inclusive adult content, and trust and safety."

== Corporate structure ==
Aylo operates under a complex structure of multiple companies in countries such as the British Virgin Islands, Canada, Curaçao, Cyprus, Germany, Ireland, Luxembourg, Mauritius, the Netherlands, the United Kingdom, and the United States. Its structure has been described as mostly a way to avoid corporate tax by a de facto Canadian company; with billing companies in Ireland, subsidiaries in Curaçao and holding ones in Cyprus and Luxembourg, all countries that have been identified as tax havens or having lax tax regulations. Canada also has special tax treaties with Luxembourg, the legal headquarters of Aylo, where a Canadian subsidiary is exempt from taxes paid on royalties to its Luxembourg parent.

Most employees work at the headquarters in Montreal on Décarie Boulevard, where more than 1,000 are employed.

== Adult industry ==
In 2013, the adult industry news website XBIZ described MindGeek as "the largest adult entertainment operator globally", and a spokesperson from Manwin, who spoke to the Irish Independent newspaper in 2013, stated that they are "one of the top five bandwidth consumption companies in the world". The Internet pornography review site TheBestPorn.com lists 164 pornographic membership sites that are owned or represented by MindGeek.

It has been reported that MindGeek's dominance in online pornography may have negative results because of the monopolistic powers they have from owning both production and distribution avenues.

=== Pornhub Network ===
The "Pornhub Network" is a group of pornographic video sharing websites operated by Aylo, which includes GayTube, Peeperz, PornIQ (launched by Pornhub), Pornhub, RedTube, YouPorn, Tube8, and Thumbzilla. The network also operates PornMD, a video search engine that aggregates content from across the group. In March 2013 PornMD launched an interactive map which allows users to view the top 10 searches on PornMD for any selected country, and in February 2014 they introduced a live feed which shows search terms inputted by users in real time.

The three highest-ranked sites in the Pornhub Network are Pornhub, RedTube and YouPorn. In November 2013, it was reported that Pornhub has over 1 billion visitors per month, and a December 2014 article in Adweek states that Pornhub has 50 million daily visitors. Pornhub.com scores at Alexa Global Rank 27 (as of 18 March 2019). Pornhub has been criticized for hosting non-consensual pornography, with some victims reporting that Pornhub failed to act or acted slowly or ineffectively when pointed to the videos of them. They were also criticized for their partnership with GirlsDoPorn and failure to remove their videos from the website after sex trafficking charges against the company were filed. After significant backlash, on 14 December 2020, Pornhub removed all non-verified videos on their platform.

TrafficEstimate.com said that Redtube.com generates over 90 million visits per month, while YouPorn.com had almost 80 million visits per month (based on the data for 30 days up to mid-November 2014. Data for Pornhub.com was not available from TrafficEstimate). YouPorn claim that their partner program has 400 content providers who participate.

=== Pornography for mobile devices ===
As of 2014, MindGeek's mobile pornography websites handled millions of visits each day in North America; they were awarded the "Future Mobile Award for Mobile Adult Services" by Juniper Research in 2012.

=== Pornographic movie studios ===
MindGeek owns the pornographic movie studios Babes.com, Brazzers, Digital Playground, Reality Kings, Sean Cody, Twistys, Mofos.com and Men.com, they manage the websites of Wicked Pictures, and Really Useful Ltd., and they established 3DXSTAR in partnership with Funky Monkey Productions. Mindgeek also manage Playboy's online and television operations (although they no longer manage Playboy.com. See history section above). In January 2014, a Mindgeek official stated that they were developing an Android app for Google's Chromecast digital media player, along with an app for Panasonic smart TVs, that would enable streaming of Playboy.tv content. The plan to release a Chromecast app was shown to be unfeasible in February 2014, when Google originally revealed their terms of service for Chromecast app developers, which stated that "We don't allow content that contains nudity, graphic sex acts, or sexually explicit material."

=== No on Government Waste Committee ===
In November 2012, Manwin was the biggest funder of the No on Government Waste Committee. The committee ran the No on Measure B campaign, against a proposed law to require the use of condoms in all vaginal and anal sex scenes in pornography productions filmed in Los Angeles County, California. The No on Measure B campaign was supported by the Los Angeles County Federation of Republican Women, the Los Angeles County Republican and Libertarian Parties, the Valley Industry & Commerce Association (VICA), and the Log Cabin Republicans of Los Angeles.

== Advertising ==
Aylo owns TrafficJunky, an online advertising network that operates across its properties. The vice president of Pornhub, Corey Price commented in December 2014 that Pornhub wants to make watching porn "something that's acceptable to talk about", which would be likely to benefit Pornhub, since according to Price "it's still taboo [to advertise on X-rated sites like Pornhub]". In October 2013, the media and marketing publication Digiday reported that Pornhub has already shown advertisements for various mainstream products on the Pornhub web site, including advertisements for movies, musical acts, anti-virus software, and a food delivery service, although most advertisements were still adult-related.

In mid-March 2023, it was reported that the Russian private military company Wagner Group had purchased recruitment advertising on the network, which was later pulled by Pornhub due to its political nature.

=== Malvertising ===
In April 2013, security researcher Conrad Longmore, who writes a blog on malware, spam and scams, published a report on the serving of malvertising by third-party advertisers on internet pornography websites. Longmore's figures were collected using Google Safe Browsing Diagnostics, which looks for harmful content on websites, and the statistics for two sites; xHamster and Pornhub were published by BBC News. The BBC article stated that based on Longmore's research, 5% of pages on xHamster (which has never been owned by Manwin), and 12.7% of pages on Pornhub incorporated malvertising. Manwin said in a statement that their own figures showed that 0.003% of the advertisements they served over the period that Longmore's data was collected contained malware, and they said that the advertisements they serve are monitored for malware and malware is immediately removed.

In July 2013, Manwin announced an agreement with security vendor RiskIQ to provide security monitoring for ads served by TrafficJunky, including proactive monitoring for malware before and after they go live.

== Age controls and child protection ==
Many US states have passed legislation requiring pornographic websites to verify that their users are aged over 18, or else be vulnerable to civil lawsuits. In response Aylo has ceased operating in those states, saying that it cannot comply with the laws without violating its users' privacy.

=== ASACP ===
Aylo has been a Platinum Sponsor of the Association of Sites Advocating Child Protection (ASACP) since 2011. ASACP is an American non-profit organization that fights against child pornography and aims to enhance the effectiveness of parental content filtering technology through the provision of the RTA ("Restricted to Adults") label, which can be implemented by webmasters of adult sites.

=== Age verification in the UK ===
In March 2014 the UK video-on-demand co-regulator ATVOD requested a change in the law so that credit and debit card operators would be forbidden from processing payments from British customers of pornographic websites that did not carry out age checks before granting access. MindGeek responded in a statement: "The best solution lies in a multi-layered approach in which the parent assumes the central role." The UK's Conservative Party won the country's 2015 general election with a pledge to obligate UK internet service providers to block access to hardcore pornographic websites that did not implement age restrictions by using verifiable age checks. In light of this MindGeek joined talks in May 2015 with the Digital Policy Alliance (DPA), an organization that is funded by digital technology companies and informs members of parliament in the UK and the EU on policy issues that affect online and digital technologies. The DPA has a working group to create age verification methods that could be used to comply with such laws.

The Digital Economy Act 2017 introduced the relevant legislation, and in March 2018 MindGeek announced that its AgeID age-verification tool, which has been in use in Germany since 2015, would be made available in the UK in time for the proposed introduction of compulsory age-verification in April 2018. It was intended that the software would be made commercially available to all pornographic websites accessible within the UK, and offered free to independent UK studios, producers and bloggers. The software uses "third-party age-verification companies" to authenticate the age of those who register, after which they are able to access multiple sites across multiple devices without logging in again. MindGeek was one of the leading private companies competing to provide an age-verification solution for the British Board of Film Classification, the organization designated as responsible for the age-verification process. The implementation date was originally April 2018 but was delayed allowing time for public consultation, and never implemented. The part of the Act requiring age verification was eventually repealed by the Online Safety Act 2023.

In May 2018 the Open Rights Group, a UK-based digital rights campaigning organization, criticized MindGeek's record on data security and commented: "Allowing pornographic sites to own and operate age verification tools leads to a conflict of interest between the privacy interests of the user, and the data mining and market interests of the company." In October 2019 the UK government abandoned their existing plans, instead proposing the introduction of an alternative regulatory system for the Internet.

== Lawsuits ==
=== Antitrust ===
Manwin Licensing and Digital Playground filed an antitrust lawsuit in California in November 2011, against ICANN and ICM Registry over the introduction of the .xxx TLD. Amongst their allegations, Manwin claimed that in introducing the new suffix, ICANN and ICM registry had exploited the market by making domain registrations expensive with no price caps in place, and created a need for defensive domain registrations with no provision for companies to block typos of their trademarks. Manwin announced that it would not allow its content to be used on any sites with the suffix, with Fabian Thylmann, who was then managing partner of Manwin saying: "We oppose the .XXX domain and all it stands for. It is my opinion that .XXX domain is an anticompetitive business practice that works a disservice to all companies that do business on the Internet."

In September 2012, ICM filed a counterclaim for $120 million against Manwin Licensing International. Part of the 24-page long claim alleged: "Manwin, Digital Playground, and their related companies, affiliates, brands, and certain third-party affiliates have conspired to boycott the .XXX TLD and have coerced and/or encouraged the boycott of .XXX websites by third parties."

All of ICM's counterclaims were dismissed in the second half of February 2013. The judge in the case stated: "Harm to ICM only is not sufficient to constitute antitrust injury. It must allege harm to the competitive process."

In May 2013, Manwin agreed to settle the antitrust lawsuit it brought against ICM Registry over the cost of .xxx web domain names. The settlement will result in discounted wholesale prices of $7.85 a year for .xxx names during May 2013, and similar offers in the future. ICM Registry is owned by British former fax-machine mogul Stuart Lawley. The settlement provides that ICM will not pay any money directly to MindGeek.

=== Patents ===
In May 2013, ExitExchange Corp. sued Manwin USA Inc. in Texas, alleging that its patent for pop-under advertisements had been infringed by Tube8.com and Pornhub.com.

In July 2013, Manwin was sued by John Mikkelson and Robert Freidson, the operators of Skky Inc., in Minneapolis over the alleged infringement of a patent that describes a method for delivering compressed audio and images on mobile devices.

In October 2014, MindGeek USA Inc. was sued by Preservation Technologies LLC in Delaware for alleged infringement on 19 different sites operated by Mindgeek of 11 patent components on data distribution and communication systems, such as a system for cataloging and retrieving videos and other media associated with keywords. The case was withdrawn in March 2015, after Mindgeek came to a settlement deal with Preservation Technologies LLC.

=== Hosting non-consensual pornography ===
In December 2020, MindGeek was sued in California for hosting non-consensual pornography produced by GirlsDoPorn, which coerced women into appearing in their videos under false pretenses. The forty plaintiffs sought $80 million in damages including distress, ostracization, trauma and attempted suicide. The lawsuit claims that MindGeek knew about the company's sex trafficking as early as 2009 and definitely by fall 2016, but continued to partner with GirlsDoPorn until the company became defunct. MindGeek featured GirlsDoPorn as a Content Partner and a member of the Viewshare Program. The lawsuit also alleges that MindGeek failed to remove GirlsDoPorn videos despite requests for removal by victims, as recently as December 2020. Another ten women joined the lawsuit, which was settled in October 2021 under undisclosed terms.

In January 2021, a class action lawsuit making similar claims was launched in Montreal. The Canadian proposed class action sought $600 million for anyone who had pornography photos and videos, some of which may have been taken when they were underage, shared on MindGeek's sites without their consent, since 2007. The lawsuit stated that MindGeek knowingly did not "investigate or question its business partner regarding the mounting evidence of sex trafficking".

On 21 December 2023, Aylo agreed to pay a fine of $1.8 million plus additional compensation to GirlsDoPorn victims, and to have an independent party assess their content moderation processes for three years.

=== Hosting child sexual abuse material of child sex trafficking victims ===
In February 2021, a civil class action lawsuit against MindGeek was launched in Alabama and it leveled claims against MindGeek/Pornhub on behalf of child sex trafficking victims. The lawsuit laid out arguments regarding the way child sexual abuse material (CSAM) of the plaintiffs was uploaded to and monetized by Pornhub. The attorneys bringing the suit included lawyers working for the National Center on Sexual Exploitation. In a ruling issued on 29 July 2022, U.S. District Judge Cormac Carney ruled that it was reasonable to conclude that MindGeek's activity in hosting child pornography was knowingly facilitated by Visa. The judge ruled in favor of the plaintiff Serena Fleites, and denied Visa's motion to dismiss the case.

In August 2022, in the immediate aftermath of the decision, Mastercard and Visa jointly suspended their acceptance of payments from TrafficJunky.

According to Michael McGrady of AVN, "2024 data from the National Center for Missing and Exploited Children's CyberTipline clearly demonstrates Aylo's sites having millions fewer cases of suspected CSAM versus major social media networks such as Facebook and Instagram."

== See also ==
- 2026 Montreal shooting, which targeted Aylo's headquarters
- Pornography in Canada
- WGCZ Holding
