= Pornography in Canada =

Pornography in Canada has changed since the 1960s when the Criminal Law Amendment Act, 1968-69 that suppressed various laws related to sexual norms was passed. There has been a shift in the mode of determining whether a material is obscene or not with the R v Butler judgment. The obscenity laws were challenged as violative of freedom of expression in R v Butler. Obscenity is defined as follows under the Criminal Code: "the undue exploitation of sex or of sex and one or more of the following subjects; namely, crime, horror, cruelty and violence." The court held that the term “undue” should be interpreted on the degree of harm which flows from such exposure that predisposes people to act in an anti-social manner. The court ruled that pornography is harmful if it contains violence or explicit sex which is degrading or dehumanizing and which creates a substantial risk of harm, as it harms a person's right to be equal. Therefore, there is a shift from the community standard's test to the harm test post the Butler judgment.

== Science ==
A 2009 study at the University of Montreal did not find any men, among the 20 men they interviewed, in their 20s who claimed to have never viewed pornography.

== Economics ==
Canada has long been home to a diverse adult entertainment industry, encompassing adult film production, online content creation, live entertainment, webcam services, and digital subscription platforms. While the industry has evolved significantly with the rise of the internet and creator-driven platforms, Toronto and Montreal remain two of the country's most recognized hubs for adult entertainment.

The Canadian adult entertainment industry has changed dramatically over the past several decades. During the 1980s and 1990s, the market was largely driven by physical media, adult magazines, and video production companies. The growth of high-speed internet in the early 2000s shifted the industry toward online distribution, streaming services, and independent content creation.

Today, many Canadian creators operate independently through subscription-based platforms, social media, and personal websites rather than traditional production studios.

== Sale of hardcore pornography ==
The sale of hardcore pornography is illegal in Canada to anyone under the age of 18 (19 in some provinces), but anyone above that age may own or possess pornography.

== Distribution ==
Most pornography is sold in adult stores, on adult websites or convenience stores. No specific laws control distribution of pornography. The Canada Border Services Agency is empowered to stop the importation of materials prohibited under obscenity laws. Many gay and lesbian bookstores have claimed that this is applied in a discriminatory manner against same-sex pornographic material.

== Television stations ==
Conversely, some over-the-air television stations (particularly Citytv and TQS) often broadcast softcore pornographic films after midnight. Hardcore films also air on MX excess, one of the seven multiplex channels operated by The Movie Network. In addition, pornographic films may be publicly shown (to those above the age of 18) and advertised, as is the case in some stores on Yonge Street in Toronto and rue Sainte-Catherine in Montréal.

== See also ==
- Censorship in Canada
- Freedom of expression in Canada § Pornography
