= Model Media =

Chinese internet pornography website

麻豆传媒
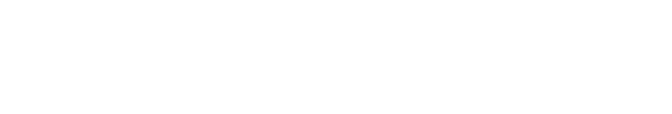
- Available in: Chinese
- Owner: "Mr. P"
- Website: mod.run
- Commercial: Yes
- Registration: United States
- Launched: 2019; 7 years ago
- Current status: Closed

Model Media (simplified Chinese: 麻豆传媒; traditional Chinese: 麻豆傳媒; pinyin: Mádòu Chuánméi) was a US-registered pornographic website producing films in Chinese. It recruited porn actors and actresses in mainland China and Taiwan. The content of its films are mainly inspired by the storylines of Japanese adult videos (JAVs) or well-known East Asian movies. Although most actors are Taiwanese, they were required by filmmakers to speak in mainland Chinese accents; the covers, advertisements, and subtitles of all films are all in Simplified Chinese.

At the end of 2020, its app was on the list of those announced by the Cyberspace Administration of China to be taken down. In January 2022, Shanghai police arrested 24 members of Model Media in Guangdong and Sichuan.

On April 2, 2026, Model Media declared its closure.
