= Sean Cody =

American gay pornography studio

- Company type: Subsidiary
- Industry: Gay pornography
- Founded: September 7, 2001; 24 years ago
- Headquarters: San Diego, California, U.S.
- Owner: MG Premium Ltd.
- Parent: Aylo
- Website: www.seancody.com

Sean Cody (company name: MG Premium Ltd.) is a gay pornography label founded in September 2001. The website predominantly features young, muscular men in solo and hardcore bareback scenes. Sean Cody has a strict model selection, with contracts requiring no prior pornographic experience ("exclusive" men).

== History ==
Sean Cody studio was established in 2001 by Sean Cody, a software engineer turned photographer. According to his self-introduction on the original website, he had a religious upbringing up until he turned 18 and left for college. He admitted that he always had a fascination for male beauty, and so after a stint in a large software company after graduation, he launched seancody.com at the age of 30. The studio featured a slate of clean-cut, straight-looking young male models, a reflection of his ideal masculinity and someone he lost his "virginity" to.

He owned and ran the company Cody Media Inc until 2015, when he sold it to porn conglomerate MindGeek (who owns other competitor studios such as Men.com). This raised some questions around the quality and exclusivity of the content, as the same parent company owned the content-sharing websites that have negatively affected many other studios. A 2014 article by Internet magazine Slate explained how "MindGeek has become the porn monopoly, putting industry members in the paradoxical position of working for the very company that profits from the piracy of their work."

In January 2012, SeanCody.com's parent company, 808 Holdings, filed a lawsuit in federal court against 122 unidentified file sharers for allegedly trading unauthorized copies of the site's first condom-free video, "Brandon & Pierce Unwrapped", in December 2011. This was the first time Sean Cody sued over online file sharing.

== Models ==
Sean Cody alumni include underwear model Simon Dexter; Aaron Savvy, a fitness model and Ultimate Fighter performer who has appeared on Hole in the Wall, a reality TV show; and Dayton O'Connor, Colby Keller, Paul Wagner, Brady Jensen, Brandon Cody, Ryan Rose, Justin Matthews, Jake Porter, Kaleb Stryker, Johnny Donovan, and Ricky Donovan ("Dayton", "Colby", "Barry", "Jonah", "Cody", "Pierce", "Taylor", "Porter", "Kaleb", "Nixon", "Kellin", "Joey", "Dean", "Deacon", "Asher", "Robbie", "Nicky", "Sly", "Kyle Denton", and "Levi II", respectively), now professional porn actors. Dakota Cochrane, who appeared on the 15th season of The Ultimate Fighter on FX, modeled as "Danny" on Sean Cody during the latter half of 2007, a decision he now regrets.

"Sean" (real first name Ben) appeared on MTV's True Life in December 2015, in an episode entitled "I Am a Gay-for-Pay Porn Star," where he talks about his family and his career in gay porn. Fellow Sean Cody performer Forrest also appears in the episode.

== See also ==
- List of gay pornographic magazines
