= Triga Films =

British gay pornography studio

Triga Films is a UK film company specialising in gay porn. Early pioneers of chav, scally, "straight lad" and working class gay films, the company started in 1997 with the release of its first film entitled Skinhead, a mildly erotic documentary about the British skinhead phenomenon and its links to gay working class culture, or gay skinheads. The company also made a lesbian release entitled Dolly Birds in 1999, before specialising entirely in gay male products.

As the company has evolved, the narrative of their films has centred on many typical working-class professions such as construction workers, "white-van-men", removal men and those in uniform, whilst others have featured story-lines which portray a world set around 'hooligans', gangsters and disenfranchised urban unemployed men.

As well as winning and being nominated for a number of industry awards and accolades from the LGBT media, such as Gay Times, and the Prowler Porn Awards, Triga has become one of the most prolific gay studios in the UK, with several releases every year. Under the direction of Triga, in 2014 the studio gave birth to a new production team in the guise of SkinBoss Films produced by adult star Daniel Walton.
