= Men.com =

Producer of gay internet pornography

- Type: Subsidiary
- Industry: Gay pornography, Bisexual pornography
- Genre: Pornography
- Founded: 2003; 23 years ago
- Headquarters: Las Vegas, Nevada, U.S.
- Parent: Aylo
- Website: www.men.com

Men.com is a gay pornographic website founded in 2003. It is owned by the Canadian company Aylo (formerly MindGeek).

== History ==
Men.com LLC purchased the domain in December 2003 from entrepreneur Rick Schwartz for US$1.3 million; Schwartz had acquired it for US$15,000 in 1997. Scenes production began around 2011. The website initially featured videos of actors performing sexual acts with condoms, but it gradually shifted to bareback content. In an article for Porn Studies, Craig Tollini analyzed how producers such as Men.com and CockyBoys "follow the normalization of pornography without condoms", and examined the impact of this transition on both media and audiences.

As of 2020, Men.com was the second most-watched gay porn website and it had expanded to nine individual sites.

== Actors and directors ==
Notable pornography actors that have worked for Men.com include Rocco Reed, who had worked in over 400 straight porn titles. Matthew Camp starred in a film series inspired on Tom of Finland. Matt Lambert directed one of these scenes, "Pleasure Park".

== Reception ==
Joseph Brennan was critical of the actors featured on Men.com, describing their performances as "monolithic" and confined to specific top and bottom roles. In his review of the subsite Super Gay Hero, which includes parodies of popular franchises such as Pokémon Go, Star Wars, Game of Thrones, and Pirates of the Caribbean, Brennan noted that, like other Men.com productions, the subsite features hypermasculine actors portraying superheroes. He concluded that the microsite "replicates tried-and-tested gay porn conventions, rather than using parody to subvert them".

In January 2020, Men.com had a traffic ranking of 31,083 according to Alexa Internet.

=== Awards ===
GayVN Awards
Year	Nomination	Recipient	Result	Ref.
2018	Best Marketing – Company Image	Men.com	Won	
2021	Best Fetish Sex Scene	Dirk Caber, Nate Grimes, Jaxx Thanatos and Kurtis Wolfe	Won	
2024	Best Fetish Sex Scene	Spikey Dee and Joey Mills	Won	
2025	Best Directing – Featurette	Alter Sin	Won	
2025	Best Featurette	"Prisoner of War: 10 Years Later"	Won	
2025	Best Supporting Actor – Featurette	Allen King	Won	

Grabby Awards
Year	Nomination	Recipient	Result	Ref.
2015	Best Web Original Content	Men.com	Won	
2017	Best Videography	Tarzan: A Gay XXX Parody	Won	
2017	Best Art Direction	Star Wars : A Gay XXX Parody	Won	
2019	Best Actor	Diego Sans	Won	
2019	Best Parody	Pirates: A Gay XXX Parody	Won	
2024	Best Scene	Mr. Deep Voice and Papi Kocic	Won	
2024	Best Director/Web Series	Alter Sin	Won	
2024	Best Screenplay	Alter Sin	Won	
2024	Best Movie/Web Series	"Royally Fucked"	Won	

XBIZ Awards
Year	Nomination	Recipient	Result	Ref.
2022	Gay Site of the Year	Men.com	Won	

=== In popular culture ===
In 2017, a line from a Men.com scene titled "Private Lessons, Part 3" (later renamed "Right in Front of My Salad?") became an Internet meme. The scene depicts a woman eating a salad before noticing the cook is having sex with her husband behind the kitchen counter, and exclaiming, "Are you guys fucking? Right in front of my salad?!" The "right in front of my salad" meme is used in response to a post that is disgusting or unseemly. In the same year, a video was criticized in Australia for featuring an actor being penetrated with a didgeridoo, a musical instrument created by Aboriginal Australians.

== See also ==
- List of male performers in gay porn films
- List of pornographic film studios
