= Reality Kings =

American pornographic film studio

- Type: Subsidiary
- Industry: Pornography
- Founded: 2000; 26 years ago
- Founder: Kristopher Hinson, Robert Garner III
- Headquarters: Miami Beach, Florida, U.S.
- Area served: Worldwide
- Key people: Ernesto Morales(CEO)
- Parent: Aylo
- Website: www.realitykings.com

Reality Kings (company name: MG Premium Ltd.) is an independent American brand launched by RTA Netmedia, an internet-based hardcore pornography production company operating out of Miami Beach, Florida.

== Acquisition by MindGeek ==
A merger notification (with Manwin) was filed with the Austrian Federal Competition Authority in April 2012. In September 2012 Manwin (now known as Aylo) completed the acquisition. Reality Kings is a part of the Pornhub Network.

== Ranking ==
As of July 2021, Reality Kings has a traffic ranking of 19,245.

== Logo ==
The Reality Kings logo has gone through multiple modifications over the years, and there are various versions of it. A crown features in most, although sometimes it's just the name, and sometimes the name is within the crown, while at other times, the crown is resting on the name.

== Controversies ==
In 2010 Florida A&M University (FAMU) filed a lawsuit against Reality Kings over what is commonly known as the FAMU Sex Tape. The suit alleges that the company tarnished FAMU's reputation due to a video depicting eight performers whom DareDorm described as FAMU students performing sexual acts on each other. The university also sued the performers. Although Reality Kings announced its intention to fight the lawsuit, less than a month later it settled the case and paid FAMU $120,000. Reality Kings apparently has settled with the 26 recording company plaintiffs that sued the porn company over allegedly poaching music from some top recording artists and using it in 193 adult videos. In 2011 Reality Kings filed a motion to dismiss a lawsuit brought by a woman who claims the company featured her runaway, underage daughter in a porn film. Reality Kings, in its motion to dismiss, said it was fraudulently misled because the daughter misrepresented her age not only to Reality Kings but to various state and federal agencies.
