= YouPorn =

Free pornographic video sharing website

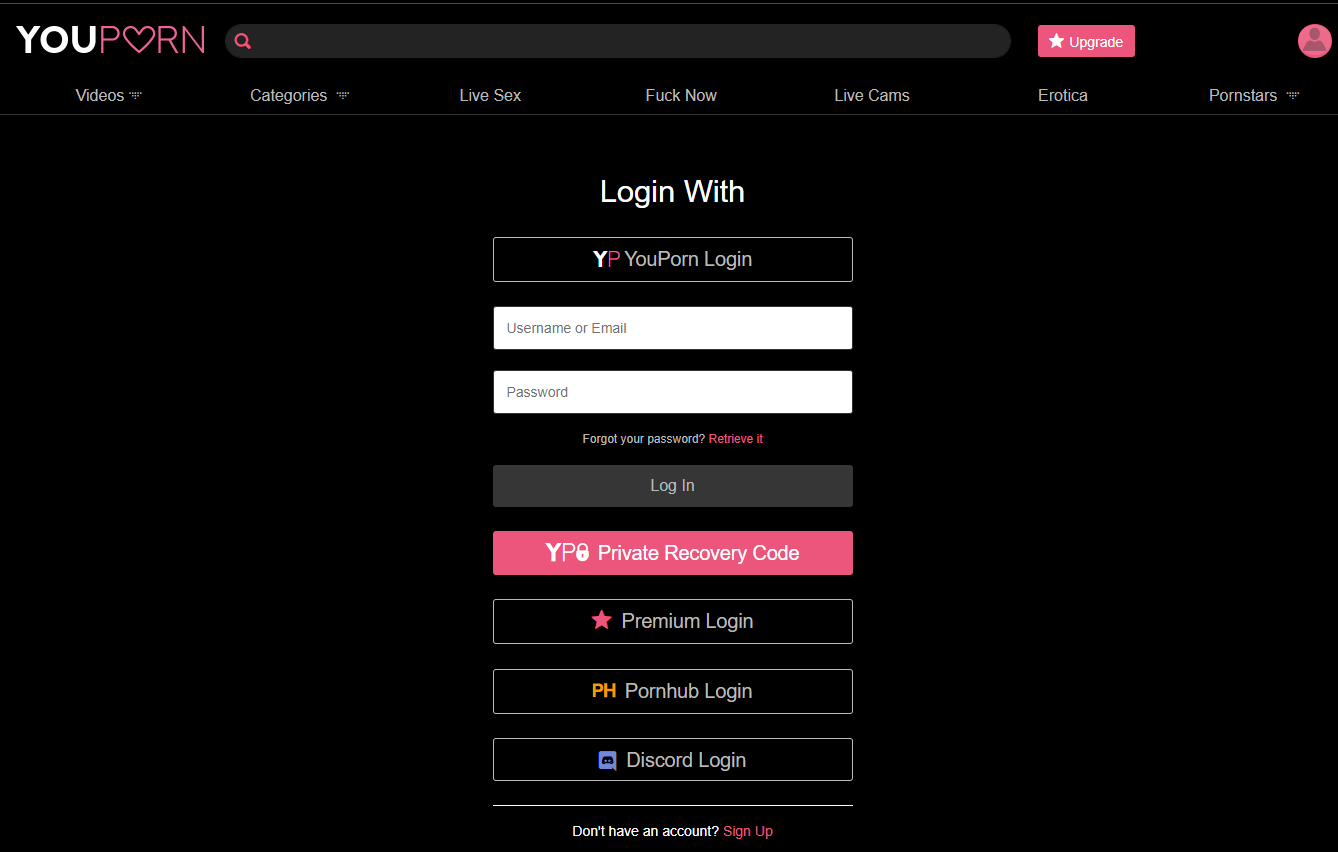
- Screenshot Login Interface
- Website type: Pornographic video sharing
- Available in: English, French, German, Spanish, Italian, Dutch, Turkish, Polish, Russian, Afrikaans, Romanian
- Founded: August 2006
- Headquarters: Limassol, Cyprus
- Country of origin: United States
- Owner: Aylo
- Industry: Sex
- Services: Pornography
- Website: www.youporn.com
- Registration: Optional
- Launched: August 26, 2006; 20 years ago
- Current status: Active
- Content license: Gratis; youporninhd.com is proprietary

YouPorn is a free pornographic video-sharing website owned by Aylo that launched in August 2006.

== Ownership ==
YouPorn's own site reports that its owner is Midstream Media International N.V., seated in Willemstad, the capital city of Curaçao, an island in the southern Caribbean Sea that forms a constituent country of the Kingdom of the Netherlands. The site is run from a hosting service in Texas, although one reporter described the site as "German-based".

In 2011, YouPorn was purchased by the adult entertainment and IT company Manwin, owners of other popular pornographic websites such as Pornhub and SpankWire based in Luxembourg.

== Bandwidth ==
As of 2012, ExtremeTech reported YouPorn transferred an average of 950 TB per day, up from a reported figure of 3 TB per day in 2006.

== Response ==
Concerns have surfaced over the inability to verify the age of the persons depicted in the videos, the possibility of copyrighted videos being uploaded to the site, and the possibility of privacy violations when private sex tapes are uploaded without the consent of all involved parties. In 2007 Vivid Entertainment took legal action against YouPorn, claiming that the streaming of copyrighted material was depriving it of revenue.

YouPorn has been called "a good role model for the sexually naive", as many of its homemade videos depict amateur couples having ordinary sex (known as "Amateur"), as opposed to the often unreal scenarios of commercial porn.

== Data breaches ==
In February 2012, the site was hacked, with the details of over 1 million users leaked onto the Internet. MindGeek blamed this on the failings of a third-party chat service.

== Blocking ==
=== France ===
After France passed a law requiring age verification for pornographic sites in June 2025, Aylo blocked access to YouPorn, as well as RedTube and Pornhub in France.

=== Germany ===
German law does not allow hardcore pornography without an effective age verification system, and the German Federal Department for Media Harmful to Young Persons placed YouPorn on its index. As a result, since April 2007, the German site of the Google search engine classified YouPorn as a hardcore pornography website and replaced it with a link to Chilling Effects, claiming that a "German regulatory body reported illegal material".

Following a request by Kirchberg, the owner of a competing pornography service (now defunct), German provider Arcor categorized YouPorn and a few other porn sites as hardcore pornographic and also blocked access to the website at the routing level in September 2007, affecting over 2 million users. The German Pirate Party promptly opened a proxy server so that Arcor customers could continue to easily access YouPorn.

Arcor lifted the block on September 17 because the IP address-based filter which had been set up for YouPorn adversely affected other sites. Kirchberg then sued, alleging that Arcor aided unfair competition by YouPorn, and on October 19, 2007, obtained a temporary injunction ordering Arcor to resume limiting the accessibility to YouPorn.com. On October 23, 2007, Arcor started to control access to YouPorn again, this time with a DNS-based approach that is easily circumvented, and successfully filed an appeal against the injunction.

Kirchberg has sent notices to 19 German ISPs demanding that YouPorn be granted access limitations, but none have complied. Efforts by Kirchberg to obtain injunctions regarding YouPorn from internet providers in Kiel and Düsseldorf were unsuccessful.

=== Singapore ===
In May 2008 it was reported that Singapore had blocked access to YouPorn and RedTube, in what a government officials described as "a symbolic statement".

=== Sri Lanka ===
In July 2009 Sri Lanka blocked access to 12 porn web sites including YouPorn, RedTube, XVideos and xHamster. On July 25, 2009, Sri Lanka Chief Magistrate Nishantha Hapuarachchi ordered the Telecommunications Regulatory Commission to block those 12 websites from all local Internet Service Providers.

=== India ===
The Government of India banned YouPorn in 2018, among other porn websites, after a Uttarakhand High Court court order demanding the same in a rape case where the perpetrators stated they were motivated to do so after watching online pornography.

== Team YP ==
YouPorn sponsors an esports team known as Team YP. In July 2014, YouPorn stated their intentions to enter the professional esports scene by sponsoring either a Dota 2 or League of Legends team. On December 3, 2014, YouPorn announced their official entry into the Dota 2 scene with the acquisition of a Spanish team previously known as Play2Win. On June 9, 2015, Team YP announced that they had signed Super Smash Bros. player Jason "Bizzarro Flame" Yoon. Team YP's Street Fighter division consists of Valentin "Valmaster" Petit and Anton "Filipin0man" Herrera with the former being signed on September 23 and the latter being signed on October 8. In October 2015, Team YP announced they were searching for a Counter-Strike: Global Offensive team. They stated they wanted one all-male and one all-female team.

== See also ==
- Comparison of video services
- Internet pornography
- List of video hosting services
- Porn 2.0
