= Brazzers =

Canadian pornographic production company

- Type: Subsidiary
- Industry: Pornography
- Genre: All
- Founded: 2004; 22 years ago
- Headquarters: Montreal, Quebec, Canada
- Area served: Worldwide
- Key people: Fabian Thylmann
- Products: Pornographic films
- Parent: Aylo
- Website: Official website

Brazzers (/ˈbræzərz/, company name: MG Premium Ltd.) is a Canadian pornographic video production and distributing company headquartered in Montreal, Quebec, and legal domicile in Nicosia, Cyprus. It has an online network of 31 hardcore pornography websites. The company's slogan is "World's Best HD Porn Site!" It features paid subscription-based content.

As of December 2020, the company features 2,340 different models and publishes across 31 different sites.

== History ==
Founded in 2004 by a group of Montreal investors, Brazzers became part of a larger group of pornographic sites under the corporate name Mansef, which combined the names of founders Stephane Manos and brothers Sam and Hassan Youssef. The name "Brazzers" was a humorous mispronunciation of the word "brothers" in a Middle Eastern accent. In 2010, Mansef was sold to Fabian Thylmann and rebranded as Manwin Inc. In December 2012, Thylmann was extradited from Belgium to Germany on suspicion of tax evasion.

In October 2013, Thylmann sold Manwin's assets, including Brazzers, to an internal management group, MindGeek.

In August 2014, Brazzers celebrated its 10th anniversary with a billboard in Times Square in New York City, at the corner of 47th Street and 7th Avenue. It was viewable for the entire month. In 2010, Brazzers had used a Times Square billboard to promote its safe sex campaign and announce its "Get Rubber!" slogan and website.

In September 2016, the data breach monitoring website Vigilante.pw alerted the media to a database breach at Brazzers that affected almost 1 million users after the site was hacked in April 2013.

== Operations ==
Brazzers is owned and operated by Aylo, a multinational officially registered in Luxembourg. The company was formerly known as MindGeek.

Brazzers came under industry criticism for associating with streaming media sites like Pornhub. In response, in 2009 the company initiated an anti-piracy campaign.

== Litigation ==
In 2008, after being fired, producer Bobby Manila sued Brazzers for fraud and violation of the terms of his contract. The lawsuit was settled.

In February 2010, Pink Visual Studio sued Brazzers' parent company, Manwin, for copyright infringement by distributing unlicensed video content on its free video-sharing sites. Brazzers' network has been accused of benefiting from unlicensed content by indirectly benefiting from traffic from sharing sites, but this was the first time a well-known studio had sued. A class action lawsuit was considered by other studios.

In 2018, the Government of India banned Brazzers, among other porn websites, after an order from the Uttarakhand High Court demanding the same in a rape case in which the perpetrators said they were inspired by online pornography.

== Ranking ==
As of July 2021, Brazzers.com has an Amazon Alexa traffic ranking of 3,576.
