= RedTube =

American pornographic video sharing site

- Website type: Pornographic video sharing
- Available in: Multilingual
- Headquarters: Houston, Texas, United States
- Owner: Aylo
- Website: www.redtube.com
- Registration: Optional
- Launched: January 7, 2006; 20 years ago
- Current status: Online
- Content license: Free; redtubeplatinum.com is proprietary

RedTube is an American pornographic video-sharing site, which in September 2009 held an Alexa ranking within the world's top 100 sites. It is one of several pornographic websites owned by Aylo. In June 2010 it had fallen out of the top 100, but it made a return in mid-2012. As of mid September 2020 its Alexa ranking was 520. Its popularity has been ascribed to its non-sexual name, which is a reference to the non-pornographic video sharing website YouTube. The website is based in Houston, Texas, and has servers in San Francisco, New Orleans and Montreal.

== History ==
Wired reported that RedTube was one of the 5 fastest-growing websites in December 2007.

The site's database was accessed and temporarily shut down by Turkish hackers in October 2008.

In 2009, it was one of twelve pornographic sites blocked by the Sri Lankan court because access to the site, which housed images of Sri Lankan women and children, "corrupted society".

In September 2013, one of the videos was blocked in Russia due to the Federal Law On Protection of Children from Information Harmful to Their Health and Development.

In 2018, the Government of India banned RedTube, among other porn websites, after a Uttarakhand High Court court order demanding the same in a rape case where the perpetrators stated they were motivated to do so after watching online pornography.

=== Viewers ===
As of 2009, three of the largest porn sites — "RedTube, YouPorn and Pornhub — collectively only make up 100 million unique visitors". MindGeek has since acquired all three sites.

=== Cease and desist case in Germany ===
In December 2013, the German law firm "Urmann und Collegen (U+C)" sent up to 30,000 cease and desist letters ("Abmahnungen" in German) giving legal warnings to German Internet users who allegedly viewed streams from RedTube containing certain copyrighted videos, demanding them to pay a fine of 250 EUR to the law firm of which 15.50 EUR would be distributed as compensation to the company claiming ownership of copyright for the videos, the Switzerland-based "The Archive AG". By December 13 more than 20,000 people had already received such letters. It is not clear how exactly the law firm was able to collect the IP addresses of RedTube's users.

In documents filed in court in order to obtain the personal data of the individuals involved, the plaintiff claims that he had charged a company called ITGuards, Inc. (allegedly of San Jose, California) who used a proprietary software by the name of "GLADII 1.1.3", allowing them not only to collect the IP addresses of users accessing certain URL's on redtube.com, but also to determine the exact time at which the user started playing or paused the videos embedded on each of those pages.

The BBC reports that the IP addresses were provided to the law firm by the court in Cologne, which began a retrospective review of its decision after receiving complaints. While sending out cease-and-desist letters to Internet users for copyright offenses related to filesharing had been common practice in Germany before, this marks the first time that legal measures are taken against people for merely watching streamed content from a website.

== Acquisition ==
Manwin filed merger notification to acquire RedTube.com from Bright Imperial Ltd on July 31, 2013.

== See also ==
- Internet pornography
- List of most-visited websites
- List of online video platforms
- Porn 2.0
