= Money Shot: The Pornhub Story =

2023 Netflix documentary

- Promotional poster
- Directed by: Suzanne Hillinger
- Produced by: Nicki Carrico; Suzanne Hillinger
- Cinematography: Iris Ng
- Edited by: Alexis Johnson
- Music by: Kyle Scott Wilson
- Production company: Jigsaw Productions
- Distributed by: Netflix
- Release date: March 15, 2023
- Running time: 94 minutes
- Country: United States
- Language: English

Money Shot: The Pornhub Story is a 2023 Netflix documentary about Pornhub and its parent company MindGeek (now Aylo). (Note: Aylo was named MindGeek at the time of the documentary's publication and announced its renaming in August 2023. It previously used the name Manwin.) It presents interview footage from sex workers, former Pornhub employees, journalists, and anti-sex-trafficking figures. The documentary focuses on a 2020 scandal over Pornhub hosting non-consensual pornography, including of children, and how the aftermath affected pornographic performers.

When Netflix approached Jigsaw Productions about the film, director Suzanne Hillinger wanted to highlight sex workers' opinions because she believed that they had been underrepresented in media coverage. Hillinger said that many figures in the pornographic industry were initially reluctant to participate. Cherie DeVille was skeptical but participated to present the narrative that anti-sex-trafficking groups had right-wing agendas. Ex-Aylo employee Noelle Perdue worked as an archivist and fact-checker, as well as being interviewed.

According to Rotten Tomatoes, most reviews of the documentary were positive. However, reviewers were divided on many topics, including the message, provenance, and pacing. Some critics called it neutral, but others saw it as pro-sex work. The focus on the political aims of anti-sex-trafficking organizations was generally seen as a strength, but some reviews criticized the interviews as lacking depth and a viewpoint. Other reviewers concluded that Pornhub's content moderation was lacking and that there are issues with the concentration of money and power in the industry.

== Synopsis ==
The documentary, which presents interview footage without narration, opens with subjects recounting their first memories of watching pornography. It interviews sex workers and individuals associated with the Canadian corporation Pornhub, including former employees, journalists, and legal figures. It also shows the filming, editing, and organization involved in the work of pornographic performers Gwen Adora and Siri Dahl.

Pornhub began as a free tube site to watch pirated content, comparable to LimeWire for music or The Pirate Bay for movies. It was founded by three Concordia University students and sold to Fabian Thylmann of Aylo, a data company, in 2010. After Thylmann was convicted of tax evasion, Pornhub and Aylo came under the control of Feras Antoon and David Tassillo and investor Bernd Bergmair. Pornhub gained traction through search engine optimization (SEO) and turned a profit through advertisements and promotions. However, pornographic performers were unable to monetize their content on the website until the Modelhub feature in 2018.

A civil lawsuit against Pornhub has 30 plaintiffs; it is led by lawyer Michael Bowe. The plaintiffs state that the company is complicit in non-consensual pornography that featured them, including revenge porn, videos of rape, and videos of child sexual abuse. Bowe accuses Pornhub of racketeering. On this subject, Dani Pinter, a representative of the National Center on Sexual Exploitation (NCOSE), criticizes child sexual exploitation on Pornhub.

The topic of child pornography victims is the subject of a 2020 article for The New York Times by Nicholas Kristof: "The Children of Pornhub". Around the same time, the Christian non-profit Exodus Cry led a campaign, '#Traffickinghub', that opposed sex trafficking content on Pornhub. Sex workers in the documentary characterize Exodus Cry as a far-right organization founded by an Evangelical preacher, whose mission is to end all sex work, and regard NCOSE, which was formerly called Morality in Media, in a smiliar light.

Kristof's article and Exodus Cry's campaign led Mastercard and Visa to disallow payment processing with the company and caused Pornhub to ban uploads by unverified users. Kristof's article had suggested three changes to Pornhub: require user verification, prevent user download, and increase content moderation. Dahl said these were "insanely reasonable" measures that sex workers favored. However, according to Michael Stabile, most of Pornhub's income came from banner ads and so the credit card company boycotts primarily affected individual performers.

A hearing of the Parliament of Canada investigates non-consensual content on Pornhub. Evidence is presented that, though Aylo cooperates with the National Center for Missing & Exploited Children (NCMEC) to remove non-consensual content, content moderators have been expected to view at least 700 flagged videos per day—more than they can properly investigate. Stabile notes that, shortly after his location was mentioned in the Parliament of Canada, Aylo CEO Feras Antoon's mansion was burned down, although the culprit and motive are not known.

Noelle Perdue criticizes Aylo, for whom she worked as a pornographic script writer, producer, and recruiter for three years. She says that not all Pornhub executives were aware of the U.S. bill FOSTA-SESTA (2018), which affected legal sex workers. Additionally, sex workers raise issues they face from other internet companies. For example, in October 2021, OnlyFans said that it would prohibit pornographic material. Adora says this left pornographic film actors like her in financially insecure positions. Dahl comments that website censorship is an issue for sex workers: their accounts on Instagram can be shadow banned even if no sexual material is posted, and sites like OnlyFans ban words associated with consensual sexual activity, such as "pegging". Allie Knox describes that changes to Craigslist increased danger to sex workers while making child traffickers harder to identify.

== Interviewees ==
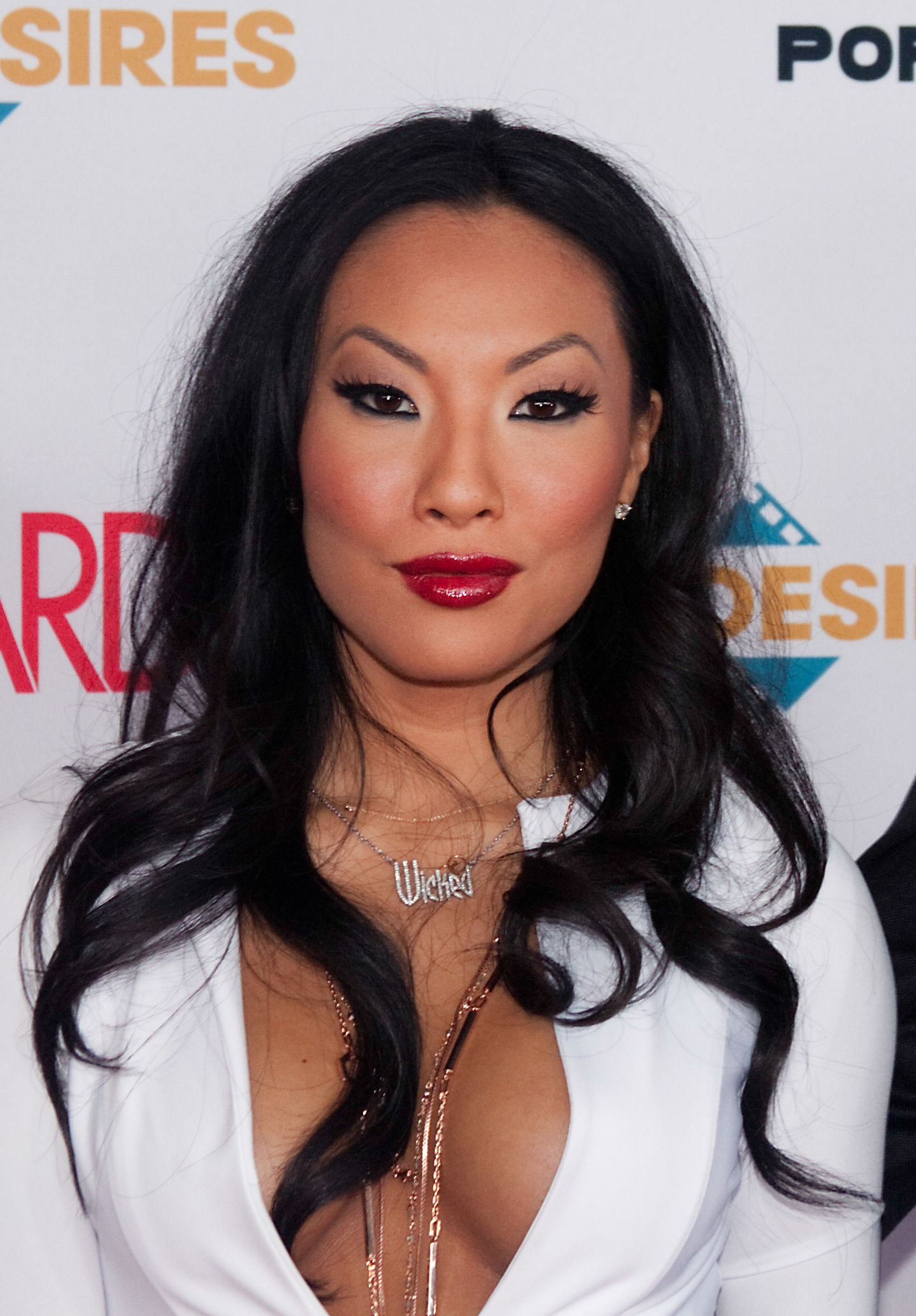
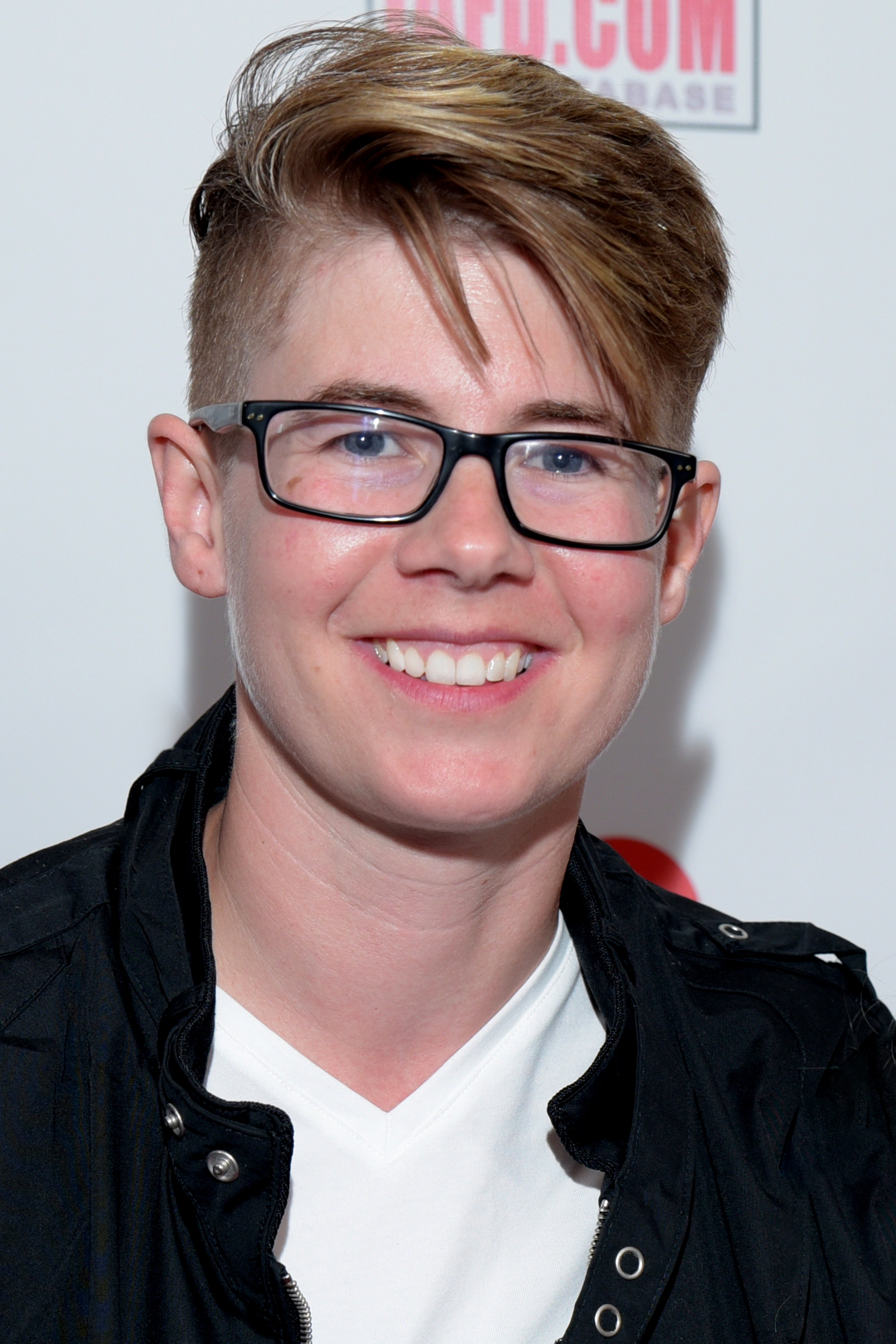
Sex workers interviewed include actor Asa Akira (left) and director Bree Mills (right).

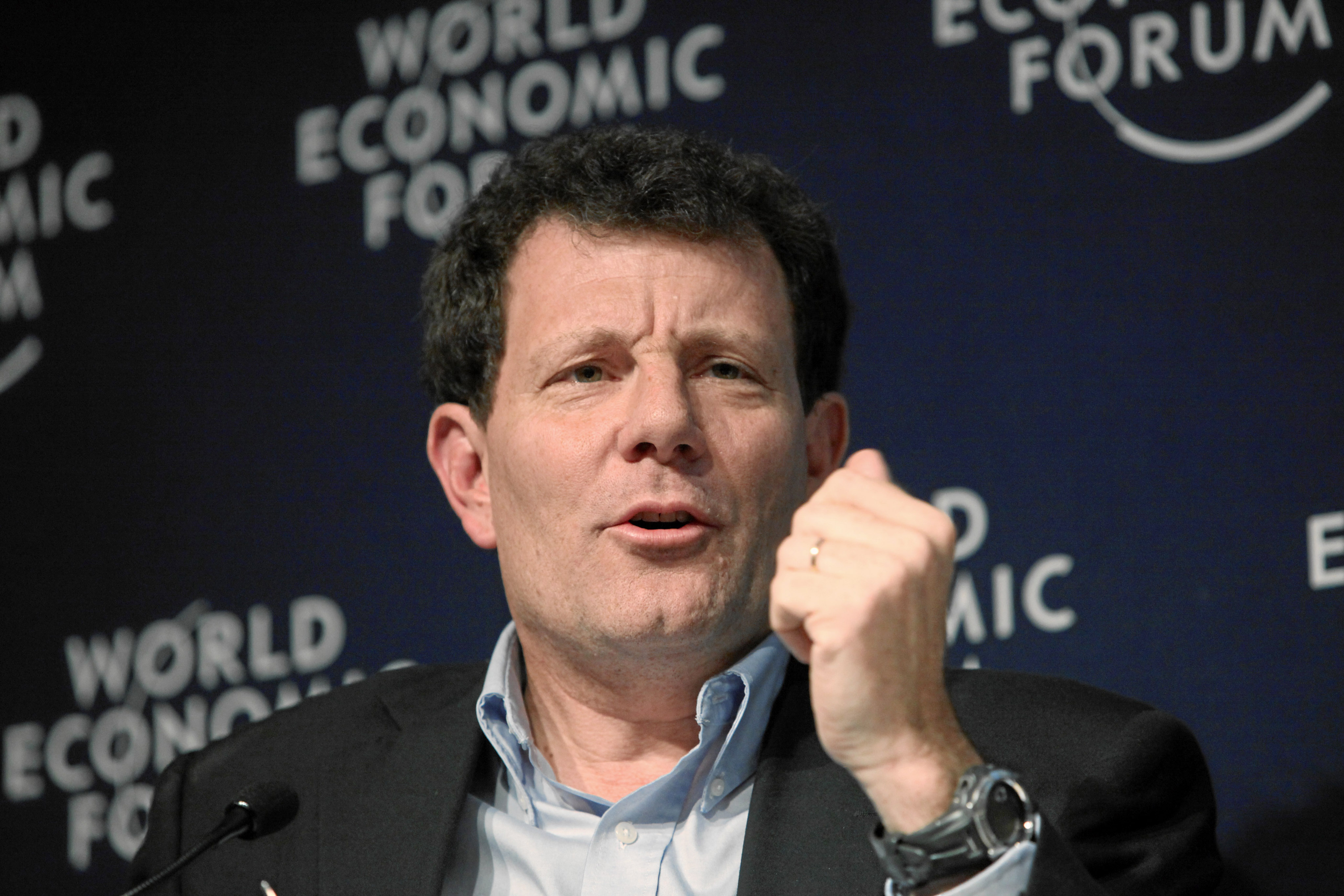
Nicholas Kristof, New York Times columnist and author of "The Children of Pornhub"

- Asa Akira, pornographic film actress and spokesperson for Pornhub
- Bree Mills, pornographic director
- Michael Bowe, legal representative for victims of non-consensual pornography on Pornhub
- Whitney Burgoyne, ex-Pornhub employee
- Siri Dahl, pornographic film actress
- Gwen Adora, pornographic film actress
- Cherie DeVille, pornographic film actress
- Natassia Dreams, pornographic film actress and spokesperson for Pornhub
- Wolf Hudson, pornographic film actor
- Allie Knox, pornographic film actress
- Noelle Perdue, ex-Aylo employee
- Martin Patriquin, journalist for The Logic
- Nicholas Kristof, columnist for The New York Times
- Michael Stabile, spokesperson for the Free Speech Coalition
- Dani Pinter, spokesperson for the National Center on Sexual Exploitation
- Yiota Souras, spokesperson for the National Center for Missing & Exploited Children

== Production ==
The documentary was released on streaming platform Netflix on March 15, 2023, in around 65 countries. It was directed by Suzanne Hillinger and edited by her wife Alexis Johnson. Netflix approached Jigsaw Productions about making a documentary on Pornhub and corporate responsibility. The first scenes shot were with Bowe on the day he filed a legal complaint.

Hillinger described the central focus as "what sexuality and consent means when billion-dollar internet platforms thrive on user-generated content". Hillinger aimed for it to facilitate "important conversations about sex and consent". Hillinger said that issues with non-consensual content applied to the entirety of the internet, not just Pornhub. According to Hillinger, NCOSE had "some questionable motives" but Pinter was knowledgeable, persuasive and did not refuse to answer difficult questions. Hillinger chose not to focus on the financial supporters of Exodus Cry or NCOSE, believing it would have distracted from larger themes of privacy, consent, and free speech.

Hillinger said that many ex-Aylo employees had signed non-disclosure agreements (NDAs) with the company and were "really, really scared" to participate in the documentary. Adora put Hillinger into contact with Perdue, who was "rightly suspicious" at first. In addition to being interviewed, Perdue served as an archivist and fact-checker for the documentary. She has written about sex work for newspapers including Slate, The Washington Post and Wired. As a self-described "internet porn historian", Perdue hoped the documentary would cause viewers to feel a "sense of responsibility" and "engage further ... out of curiosity instead of shame or stigma". Perdue began as a script writer for Brazzers, an Aylo-owned production company, and moved onto writing LGBTQ stories. After becoming uncomfortable with this, she requested a move to Modelhub. She left in 2020, perceiving the company as ignoring the feedback of pornographic performers. Perdue said that Money Shot should have shown wider context of content moderation on the internet and the nature of trafficking.

Hillinger wanted to center sex workers because she felt that they were underrepresented in Kristof's op-ed and media reporting. She did not give interviewees the right to approve the edited footage of them that was used. Hillinger said she opened conversations by acknowledging that subjects would be suspicious of her and stating that the documentary would not have a narrator. She suggested that Adora trusted her after reviewing her filmography and because of their shared queer identity. Dahl gave positive feedback to the final product, saying that it succeeded in presenting the viewpoint of sex workers "in a way they never have been before" and sparked conversations about sex work and porn among the public.

DeVille wrote in Rolling Stone that campaigns presenting as anti-sex-trafficking were right-wing, Christian, and anti-porn, and that Hillinger said the film would present this narrative. Though skeptical of being interviewed, DeVille agreed to participate, choosing to use soft colors and wear clothing that covered her skin to mitigate being portrayed as unintelligent or untruthful. Filming took place at a rented cottage outside Los Angeles over four hours. She said that she neither hated nor loved the film and did not regret her role in it.

Adora's Instagram account was suspended on the day that Money Shot premiered and Hillinger's was suspended one week later.

== Reception ==
Netflix stated that in its first week, Money Shot was streamed for 13 million hours; it was the fourth-most-watched film on the platform. It reached the top ten in each country it was available in. On review aggregator Rotten Tomatoes, which categorized 31 reviews as either positive or negative, the documentary holds an approval rating of 84%. It was rated 2.5 out of 5 stars by News24 and 2 stars by The Indian Express and The Guardian.

Some reviewers criticized the documentary's narrative and scope. The Daily Beast's Nick Schager and News24's Gabi Zietsman felt there was a lack of investigative journalism and that subjects were not covered in sufficient depth. Similarly, in The Indian Express, Rohan Naahar criticized the "loose narrative". Lucy Ford wrote in GQ that the scope was too broad. In a review for Jezebel, however, Rich Juzwiak wrote that it "excels at teasing out the nuances" of the topic. Barry Hertz suggested in The Globe and Mail that it was too slow-paced. Noel Murray of Los Angeles Times thought its runtime was too short, but that it contained irrelevant sexually explicit content. However, reviewers largely found the tone unsalacious and Schager criticised the film for misleadingly depicting pornography as largely softcore.

Various comments were made on the overall message of the documentary. The title is a pun, referring both to Pornhub's revenue streams and a cum shot in pornography. Ford lauded the decision to open with "the deeply unsexy reality" of Pornhub's use of data and advertising and the logistics of producing and editing sexual material. Ford suggested that the documentary's message is that pornography is a "capitalist monopoly" dictated by economic factors. Polygon's Katie Rife saw it to have a persuasive opposition to the concentration of unaccountable power in the hands of "tech bros and venture capitalists". Naahar believed, on the other hand, that the documentary has "absolutely nothing new to contribute": he found it obvious that Pornhub had engaged in unethical behaviors, sex workers became "collateral damage", and the company's "damage control" was not virtuous. Peter Bradshaw of The Guardian wrote that a more interesting, unexplored question is whether Pornhub—and non-pornographic websites—are publishers or platforms, and what responsibility they have for content that they host.

Critics differed on the matter of neutrality. Critics such as Zietsman and Variety's Owen Gleiberman viewed the film as neutral, the latter praising the "no-fuss journalistic evenhandedness". Murray approved its perspective as "thoughtful", despite the complicated topic. Hertz believed its neutrality was a negative, as it suffered from unresolved tension between the opposing views it presents. Zietsman commented that the documentary devoted most of its screen time to adult industry workers. Bradshaw believed the documentary presented these workers as "creative entrepreneurs and heroes of consenting sensuality". Rife said that, in the context of a longstanding clash of feminist views on pornography, it centered the underrepresented views of sex workers. Juzwiak wrote that industry workers are given a chance to explain the effects of anti-sex-trafficking measures on their lives and Pornhub was scrutinized for "grossly inadequate" content moderation.

On the subject of anti-sex-trafficking campaigners, Rife wrote that the documentary takes a "bold stance": the campaigners overstate the prevalence of child sexual abuse material on Pornhub. Gleiberman said that documentary gives "detached and sobering" analysis of the campaigners claims. Juzwiak opined that the documentary succeeds in showing that "anti-sex operatives" are capitalizing on a legitimate backlash to sexual exploitation with a "narratively compelling" reveal of NCOSE's political agenda, albeit one that "somewhat confuses the message". As well as Juzwiak, Schager was critical of Pinter's commentary on behalf of NCOSE. The lack of contributions from current Pornhub employees or anti-Pornhub campaigners was criticized by Naahar. Similarly, it was conspicuous to Bradshaw that Exodus Cry's Laila Mickelwait was not interviewed.

== See also ==
- Hot Girls Wanted
- Hot Girls Wanted: Turned On
