= XHamster =

Pornographic video sharing website

xHamster
- Website type: Pornographic video sharing
- Headquarters: Limassol, Cyprus
- Owner: Hammy Media Ltd
- Founders: Oleg Netepenko; Dmitri Gusev
- Website: xhamster.com
- Advertising: Ad-supported
- Registration: Optional
- Launched: 2 April 2005; 21 years ago
- Current status: Online
- Content license: Free and premium pornography

xHamster is a pornographic video sharing and streaming website based in Limassol, Cyprus. It was founded by Oleg Netepenko and Dmitri Gusev in 2005. xHamster serves user-submitted pornographic videos, webcam models, pornographic photographs, and erotic literature, and incorporates social networking features. As of October 2025, it is the 29th most-visited website in the world, and the second-most-visited adult website, after Pornhub.

The site produced The Sex Factor, a reality TV series in which contestants compete to become porn stars and OnlyFans stars. The site has been targeted as part of malvertising campaigns, and some governments have blocked xHamster as part of larger initiatives against Internet pornography.

== History ==
In August 2007, Russian citizens Oleg Netepenko and Dmitri Gussew (Note: Publicly appears under the name Alex Hawkins) launched xHamster. xHamster was envisioned as a social network; a spokesperson said the site's content organization scheme was intended to "allow people who wanted to chat, exchange erotic pics and share amateur videos ... to find mutual friends online and maybe discover partners interested in intimate relationships". In 2015, xHamster became the third most popular pornographic website, after XVideos and Pornhub. In May 2016, xHamster launched The Sex Factor, a reality series competition where contestants compete to become a porn star.

xHamster has restricted access to its site and removed content in response to political issues concerning the LGBTQ community and rape culture. The site blocked users with IP addresses based in North Carolina during April 2016, after the state enacted a law that stopped its counties and cities from passing laws to protect LGBTQ people. In response to the verdict of the People v. Turner sexual assault case, xHamster instituted a "Brock Turner rule", which banned videos involving rape, including those involving sex with an unconscious partner or hypnosis. In the aftermath of the 2016 Democratic National Committee email leak, xHamster offered Debbie Wasserman Schultz a $50,000 role in a pornographic film with a Bernie Sanders lookalike.

In August 2018, xHamster sent a letter to the creators of the television series Sense8, Lilly and Lana Wachowski, requesting to host the third season of Sense8, after the show was dropped from Netflix.

In August 2018, xHamster launched a $25,000 xHamster for Women Fund to expand the content in the "Porn for Women" category of the site. According to xHamster vice president Alex Hawkins, the goal of the fund is to increase the availability of porn that women viewers want to watch as well as to address the discrepancy between the site's visitors, 25% of whom identify as women, and the 95% of site content aimed at a male audience. Submissions were judged by "a rotating team of women-identified judges, made up of fans, porn stars, journalists and xHamster employees". Starting 1 September, amateur and professional women-identifying filmmakers could apply for grants in the range of $500 to $10,000. The films will be made available for free and without interest claims from xHamster.

In September 2018, the website released an interactive online guide map, titled "Legendary Porn Theaters of NYC", marking the most famous porn locations in 1970s New York City.

== Website ==
xHamster provides various pornographic videos, photos, fuclone and erotic stories grouped under categories catering to specific fetishes or sexual preferences. In addition to prerecorded videos, users can view live streams of paid models; the model can interact with several users by means of an online chat service. Models can also activate a "Tip" button, which allows users to provide the models additional money. Since 2017, xHamster has used an artificial intelligence model that scans material on its website to target individual user preferences. In reaction to growing demand for tech-related content, xHamster created a virtual reality platform to explore opportunities for VR techniques in the porn industry.

xHamster also contains several social networking features, including user profiles, a commenting and rating system, and the ability to interact by adding others as "friends" or subscribing to another's content. A user can verify their identity by submitting a photo of themselves with their username, which confers a stamp on their profile.

In August 2020, xHamster came under criticism for the deepfake pornography videos the site hosts. When asked about xHamster's policy on deepfake videos, Alex Hawkins reported that while the company lacks a specific policy regarding deepfakes, it would remove such videos when it became aware of them, as they are a violation of the site's terms of use.

=== HTTPS ===
In January 2017, xHamster became one of the first major adult sites to incorporate HTTPS encryption. HTTPS allows for privacy, malware protection, and the integrity of information exchange. Alex Hawkins said that one of the reasons for HTTPS was because xHamster receives millions of visitors from countries where pornography is illegal.

=== Security ===
In April 2013, Conrad Longmore, a cyber security researcher, found that xHamster and PornHub were attacked with malvertisements. In September 2015, xHamster was hit with another malvertising attack along with YouPorn and PornHub. TrafficHaus reported that it might be the result of a breach. On 28 November 2016, it was revealed that the usernames, email addresses and passwords of 380,000 users were stolen.

In an effort to maintain user anonymity, xHamster stated in a Men's Health interview that they limit third-party access to user information when sending viewer data to marketing and analytics groups. While these security measures do not necessarily eliminate the possibility of linking a "browser fingerprint" and IP address to a user's personal identity, xHamster claims that it does not actively identify individuals unless one decides to "opt in to providing more personal, identifiable info".

In 2025, xHamster agreed to settle a lawsuit brought by the state of Texas by paying a $120,000 penalty over noncompliance with the state’s age verification law.

=== Sex education ===
In response to lawmakers in the US state of Utah rejecting a sexual education bill in February 2017, xHamster started presenting a popup to visitors from Utah, offering them to view xHamster's sexual education series "The Box". The rejected House Bill 215 would have allowed parents to opt their children in for more comprehensive sexual education than the abstinence-only sex education common in Utah, but was opposed for encouraging sexual behaviour and allowing children to be taught how to have sex. The bill's sponsor criticized the trend of leaving sexual education to pornographic websites such as xHamster and Pornhub.

In April 2017, in response to US President Donald Trump's decision to allow states to deny federal money to Planned Parenthood, xHamster stated that they would be posting to their site information on Planned Parenthood with a popup encouraging donations to the organization. The post states, "Porn stars and amateurs alike depend on increased reproductive rights, access to birth control and low-cost STI screenings, and non-judgmental sexual health education".

=== Product history ===
In November 2016, the company released its own beer, xHamster beer. The beer is an 8.5% ABV Belgian Triple-style ale. Costing €3.90 for 0.55 liters, it sold out within five days.

In May 2017, xHamster partnered with Dutch inventor Moos Neimeijer to create Minimeyes, a motion sensor Bluetooth device that uses infrared to monitor the room and signals the computer to shut all windows and sound when an intrusion is detected.

In June 2017, xHamster released a sex doll named xHamsterina in collaboration with the manufacturer iDoll.

Since October 2017, xHamster has launched a product campaign that addresses "owners of apocalypse bunkers". Against receipt, owners receive some of the company's products and videos for free.

=== Censorship ===
xHamster has been blocked by various governments. In August 2015, the government of India ordered Internet service providers to block several sites, including xHamster, under the IT Act. In Russia, a local court in the Republic of Tatarstan ruled in favour of a block on xHamster and other pornographic websites in April 2014; the ruling was passed on a year later to Roskomnadzor, the state media overseer.

Legislation to restrict pornographic sites includes efforts targeted at reducing human trafficking which may mandate electronic manufacturers to install content filters to restrict "obscene" material. Nevertheless, organizations in support of free speech have been speaking out against the efforts to include porn sites such as xHamster which noted 125 million clicks from Thailand and 95 million clicks from users in Turkey, where the site is banned.

Other attempts at censorship have their origins in violating net neutrality, whereby governments may restrict bandwidth to various Internet categories. xHamster's Alex Hawkins stated, "As an international company, we see every day how restrictive governments use regulatory tools, like traffic throttling, to limit access to not only porn but political speech".

In September 2018, the Nepali government announced a ban on pornographic websites in response to public outcry regarding the rape and murder of a young Nepali girl. A few weeks later, xHamster released a graph that showed that after a slight dip in usage, traffic to its site from Nepal resurged to previous levels. India blocked xHamster again in late 2018. News discussions of India's porn ban cited both xHamster's data on Nepal as well as the site's data on traffic from China following that country's 2018 porn ban, which resulted in an 81% decline in visitors from China to the xHamster site.

As a step to promote "healthy relationship, sex, and consent", the British Board of Film Classification (BBFC) announced in January 2019 that it would require websites hosting pornography such as xHamster to implement "rigorous" third-party age-verification prior to web entry. This legal measure was designed to restrict access to internet pornography only to viewers of legal age, which is 18 in the UK. An alternative to directly verifying one's age is the option of purchasing a "porn pass" from a designated UK retailer, allowing viewers over the age of 18 to confirm their age anonymously.

In addition to criticizing the technical issues and privacy threats of the UK rule, porn providers, producers, actors, and civil rights advocates claim that underage porn viewership stems from broader societal issues left unresolved by the new law. Likely associated with the planned enactment date of the UK rule, 15 July 2019, xHamster viewership rose sharply in the UK in the preceding months.

After the third delay for the planned UK age-verification regulations, UK Culture Secretary Jeremy Wright announced in late June 2019 that, besides the delay, he was wary about how the enactment and enforcement of national age-verification rules would vary greatly from nation to nation, much "like pre-EU Europe".

In January 2020, State Representative Brady Brammer of the US state of Utah sponsored a bill that would require a "warning label" on "adult content" in an effort to inform potential viewers of supposed dangers associated with porn consumption on youth. Salt Lake City's FOX 13 reported that the "warning label" concept was "modeled after California's toxic product warning labels". xHamster "trolled" the Utah State Legislature by adding a label visible to all Utah viewers, stating, "Warning: porn use may lead to decreased stress, increased happiness, and lower rates of teen pregnancy, divorce, and sexual assault. However, it's only for adults". On 18 February 2020, the Utah State Legislature passed the proposal into law.

In Germany, in July 2021, cases have been filed by the Commission for Youth Media Protection (KJM) at a Düsseldorf court since 2020 requiring MindGeek's subsidiaries and xHamster to request age verification. Four companies declined to require age verification, and the KJM has issued a blanket ban on the IP addresses of MindGeek websites. The ruling was to be issued in August 2021.

=== Copyright infringement ===
In 2011, xHamster was sued by Fraserside Holdings, Ltd., a producer of adult films and a subsidiary of Private Media Group, Inc. Fraserside and Private alleged that xHamster had infringed on their copyrights by streaming copies of their adult media over the Internet. Fraserside brought the case in Iowa, and in 2012 Judge Mark Bennett found that US courts lacked jurisdiction over xHamster because it is a Cyprus-based company with "no offices in Iowa, no employees in Iowa, no telephone number in Iowa[;] ... xHamster does not advertise in Iowa[;] No xHamster officer or director has ever visited Iowa[; and] ... All of xHamster's servers are located outside of the United States". The copyright infringement case was dismissed.

=== Celebrity involvement ===
As a part of the marketing strategy, xHamster increasingly publishes job offers to celebrities or persons of temporary public interest. In November 2017, xHamster offered Julie Briskman a job in its marketing & social media team via Twitter after her old employer terminated her. Briskman had attracted attention for flipping the finger at Donald Trump while passing his motorcade on a bike. After Pusha T accused Drake in a diss track of denying a child, xHamster noticed an increase in search inquiries over 2700% for the alleged mother and former porn actress Rosee Divine. In May 2018, in the aftermath of the track's release, Divine was offered a job as an official xHamster spokesmodel. In June 2018, Australian rapper Iggy Azalea received a job offer after posting twerking videos on her social media accounts.

In September 2016, Alex Hawkins, speaking for xHamster, confirmed that it had purchased a sex tape alleged to portray American actress Alexis Arquette, which was put up for sale by an ex-lover shortly after her death. xHamster destroyed all copies of it, announcing that "Ms. Arquette was an icon and activist in the trans community and we could not see someone smear her memory the way the selling party was trying to do".

Following the airing of a Lifetime Network documentary-style film, Surviving R. Kelly, xHamster reported a 388% increase in R. Kelly-related searches since January 2019. The Lifetime film presents R. Kelly's arrest, trial, and acquittal on child pornography charges between 2002 and 2008. Censored from xHamster's website, the "infamous" sex tape features the hip-hop artist engaged in sexual relations with and urinating on an underage girl. In a bid to reprimand viewers who search for the sex tape, xHamster denounced seeking the tape as both "illegal" and "immoral".

After nude outtakes from a 2016 GQ Magazine photoshoot of Iggy Azalea were leaked on Twitter in May 2019, xHamster defended the rapper's right to prevent the images' widespread accessibility.

More than four years after retiring from porn, Mia Khalifa remains one of the most-searched female actresses on xHamster, with over 780 million views, according to a 2019 Washington Post article. Khalifa is best known for starring in a film in which she wears a hijab, garnering public criticism and even death threats from the terrorist organization ISIS.

=== COVID-19 pandemic ===
Early in the COVID-19 global pandemic, xHamster offered free Premium access until the end of March to places affected by the virus such as Tehran, Iran; Daegu, South Korea; Wuhan, China; the Lombardy and Veneto regions of Northern Italy; and Adeje, Canary Islands. The company issued the offer via their official Twitter page with the tagline, "Stay safe with xHamster". In March 2020, Vice reported that xHamster witnessed an "overwhelming surge" in new subscriptions from users in the aforementioned cities and regions that "outpaced xHamster's ability to approve new accounts".

As the pandemic spread, COVID-19-themed porn began appearing on xHamster and other streaming sites in early March 2020.

Following international quarantines, travel bans, and statewide stay-at-home orders in early and mid-2020, many sex toy retailers, livecam platforms, and streaming sites reported record traffic and sales. Coupled with this boom under quarantine is a marked shift towards amateur production on paid access platforms such as xHamsterLive Sex Webcams, FanCentro, and OnlyFans. This shift has resulted in higher profits, flexibility, and creative license afforded to performers.

A 2020 article published by Mashable on changing trends in porn since the pandemic cites several user trends reported by xHamster vice president Alex Hawkins. According to Hawkins, while interest in traditional categories of porn such as MILF and incest roleplay porn has decreased, demand for public sex scenes, kissing, and COVID-19-related adult content has surged. Hawkins attributed this to a desire for porn that reflects current issues and predicted that trends would return to normal with the pandemic under control.

=== LGBTQ+ ===
In honor of Pride Month in June 2020 the site held a 3-day live cam fundraiser, inviting activists, artists, sex workers, and LGBTQ+ content creators to submit 15–30-minute segments of content. The content was promoted on the site's social media channels and through its Pride partner Stripchat, and all proceeds were donated to the trans and sex worker charities the Sylvia Rivera Law Project, the Sex Workers Outreach Project and Rainbow Railroad.

=== Illegal content ===
Until 2021, photos and videos could be uploaded anonymously on xHamster. Vice reported in 2020 that, according to first-hand research, xHamster used unpaid, untrained and anonymous volunteer moderators, who were observed arguing over what criteria could be used to identify a minor in porn footage. The volunteers were explicitly asked by xHamster to wave through content whose legality was in doubt. xHamster switched its video moderation to be done by paid employees, declining to comment on the reason.

== User trends ==
In September 2018, the site released the top seven porn categories most popular among female users of the site, with "cunnilingus", "vibrators", and "eating pussy" the top three.

From October through December 2018, xHamster reported a 10,000% increase in searches for "The Grinch". Coupled with the widespread popularity of holiday and film-themed pornography, Alex Hawkins credits the recent Hollywood remake, The Grinch for the stark increase in searches.

The site reported an upward trend in searches for sex robots from 2016 to early 2019, pointing to increasing interest in lifelike sex dolls.

In 2019 xHamster reported about 40,000 searches per month for "braces", a preference associated with teen porn but also reported as a fetish on its own.

After a sex scene aired in an April 2019 episode of the television series Game of Thrones, xHamster reported a marked jump in searches for actress Maisie Williams and her character's name, Arya Stark.

Based on xHamster's survey of 50,000 respondents from over 150 countries, Cosmopolitan reported in May 2019 that "the ideal dream woman is a 25-year-old, 5'5", Eurasian, bisexual woman named 'Shy Yume.'" This supposed "ideal" woman has blue eyes, straight, dark, long hair, an "average" body size, "fully shaved" genitals, and is "not a feminist".

In 2019, xHamster reported a 100% increase in "pirate" related searches between 18 and 19 September. The sudden popularity of pirate-themed searches, most common among 18–35 year old users, is largely attributed to "International Talk Like a Pirate Day", falling on 19 September.

After the release of the 2019 film Joker, Hawkins reported an "astounding" 1300% increase in "joker" related searches.

In a 2020 survey of 100,000 xHamster users, the company found that female-identifying viewers are younger, more sexually fluid, and outspend their male-identifying users on porn, even while watching less frequently.

Amid the 2020 Black Lives Matter protests, an article published by Vice cited data released by xHamster reflecting a surge of interest in police-related pornography. The data, which show that search terms such as "cop", "police", and "jail" rose in popularity by 39% in the US and 25% worldwide between the first week of May and the first week of June, was reported in the Vice article as part of a broader examination of the racial and social dynamics of cop-related porn.

=== Annual reports ===
Based on 2018 viewership trends, xHamster predicted that the number of female viewers in 2019 would increase by more than forty percent. While gay, bisexual, and "heavy" women search terms are on the rise, web traffic for terms such as "redhead" and "teen" are sharply declining; xHamster claims that these changes are largely due to an increase in female viewers and the normalization of porn-viewing among Millennials, who "are less ashamed about porn than any other generation". Not only is web traffic increasing among women, but so is the amount of porn viewed on handheld devices, comprising roughly two-thirds of all xHamster viewership.

Although 2019 viewership trends on xHamster's website signal an increase in free porn consumption, this trend is coupled with an increase in the purchase of "premium" services. The number of new xHamster user accounts has also sharply increased, indicating a desire for private "cam-models" and other "niche porn services".

In their 2019 "Report on Digital Sexuality", xHamster claims a "direct" statistical correlation between frequent porn consumption and bisexuality. The survey gathered viewer data from "more than 11,000 US-based users", finding that the proportion of regular porn viewers who self-identify as gay or bisexual is seven times greater than the percentage of US citizens who identify as LGBT, according to a 2018 Gallup poll.

Additionally, viewers who self-identify as gay or bisexual are more likely than self-identified heterosexuals to watch porn on a daily basis. xHamster speculates that these higher rates of porn consumption amongst members of the LGBTQ community may be related to "a lower stigma associated with watching" porn coupled with broad base support for non-normative forms of "healthy" sexual expression. Associated with these trends, xHamster reports that less than half of all self-identified women viewers are heterosexual. The same study found that nearly half of all viewers consider themselves to be "very" or "somewhat religious". Religious viewers are twice as likely as non-believers to spend up to US$1,000 for a "live cam" video experience.

In a 2019 year-end report published by xHamster, the company found that more than two-thirds (71.49%) of all site traffic was accessed on mobile devices. This is a 12% increase from 2018 and is coupled with an upward trend in amateur and amateur style porn produced on mobile devices. The report also found that more than 100,000 videos are viewed, 1400 videos downloaded and 30 uploaded every sixty seconds on the site.

A MEL magazine article from 2020 cites Alex Hawkins statement that the "shift from studios to performer-producers" is "dramatically changing the industry", resulting in more "realistic" situations and "natural" body types in porn produced via mobile devices. xHamster's 2020 year-end report found that terms such as "natural tits" and "real homemade", and situations such as voyeurism and public sex "have experienced massive growth" in recent years.

In tandem with the growth of handheld porn production and consumption, short clip porn, often only one–five seconds, has grown in recent years, migrating onto content hosts such as Reddit and platforms such as Snapchat. The social media platform, TikTok, offers a venue for accessing short clips of softcore, and occasionally hardcore, amateur pornography. Although nudity is officially banned on TikTok, the platform's monitoring algorithm is not perfect, sometimes leading to pornographic content being made publicly available for several hours before deletion.

=== Porn and millennials ===
In a Forbes article on the historical developments in the porn industry, xHamster is noted for pioneering free online streaming or "tube" sites in 2007. Following the growth of "tube" sites, fears spread that paid porn would result in the industry's death. Millennials were blamed for a reported decline in the net value of the US porn industry. While paid-access porn has shifted from professionally produced films towards amateur clips and short video streaming, paid porn viewership has not declined. A Mashable article from February 2020 finds that Millennials are in fact "outspending older generations substantially.

Mashable also finds that "starting in the mid-2010s [...] consumer trend data started to show that millennials [...] were willing to spend even more than earlier generations on movies, shows, and music". In support of this claim, Mashable reported that xHamster data finds "millennial buyers spend about twice as much as older demographics" and "make up more than half of xHamster's paying premium consumers", leading Hawkins to assert that "millennials may well be the saviors of the porn industry".

With nearly five million user-labeled videos on xHamster, Alex Hawkins deems broad search terms ineffective at finding specific scenes and videos, while searching through category filters can prove more successful. In an interview with MEL in 2020, Hawkins claimed that creating an xHamster account either paid or free, "helps AI better recommend new scenes to you based on your previous views and videos you've liked or disliked, [...] follow certain producers and stars, create personal collections and find new content more efficiently".

== See also ==
- Internet pornography
- List of chat websites
- List of video hosting services
