= Zara Dar =

American internet personality (born 2000/2001)

- Born: 2000 or 2001 (age 25–26)
- Education: University of Texas, Austin (BS, MS)
- Website: zaradarz.com

Zara Darcy (born 2000 or 2001), better known under the pseudonym Zara Dar or Zara Darz, is an American educator and OnlyFans content creator.

== Biography ==
Dar was born and raised in Texas, United States. She describes herself as having "a mixed background: American, Persian, Southern European, Middle Eastern, and Indian". She received a bachelor's degree in computer science and bioengineering from the University of Texas (UT). She then began a PhD program at UT in computational biology and drug discovery before dropping out after two years, instead receiving a master's degree in computer science focused on machine learning.

Dar began posting STEM-focused lectures to YouTube and Pornhub in 2023, making videos on topics such as neural networks and probability. In addition, she has an OnlyFans where she posts adult content; she originally joined the platform in 2022. She revealed in December 2024 that she earned over one million dollars on the platform.

In December 2024 she decided to drop out of her PhD program and become a full time content creator, focused on OnlyFans, while continuing to produce educational video content. She said the primary reason was to maintain financial freedom and autonomy and have a larger impact on the world. The video of her announcement received 1.9 million views on Instagram in the first three months and netted her 40,000 dollars in the first 24 hours. A repost of her video about her decision to quit on X received over 12 million views.

In January 2025 she made a post on X and LinkedIn showing she received almost three times as much money per million views on her educational videos on PornHub compared to YouTube; as a result, her LinkedIn account was banned. In a 2026 LinkedIn post, she shared the results of an experiment testing whether a video would get more views if she wore a tank top.
