= The Sex Factor =

- Genre: Reality; Pornography
- Presented by: Asa Akira
- Judges: Lexi Belle; Tori Black; Remy LaCroix; Keiran Lee
- Country of origin: United States
- Original language: English
- No. of seasons: 1
- No. of episodes: 10

Production
- Producer: Buddy Ruben
- Running time: 20 minutes
- Production company: xHamster

Original release
- Release: May 20 – July 22, 2016

The Sex Factor is an online reality TV series produced by xHamster where eight men and eight women compete to become a porn star. The sixteen contestants had never had sex on camera prior to the series. The show is hosted by Asa Akira, and features Lexi Belle, Tori Black, Remy LaCroix, and Keiran Lee as mentors and judges.

The show has one male and one female winner. The winners get a three-year contract with a porn film production company and an undisclosed amount of money, for a total amount of $1 million in prize value.

== Filming ==
Casting took place in two rounds: one in December 2014 and one in January 2015, during that year's AVN Expo. Filming took place during early 2015. None of the performers have been paid for their presence in the show.

== Contestants ==
The 16 contestants who competed to win The Sex Factor are:

=== Male ===
- Donnie Rock, 31, from Denver, Colorado.
- Barry Newport, 24, from Orange County, CA.
- David Caspian, 25, from Bronx, NY.
- Buddy Hollywood, 26, from Las Vegas, NV. In Episode 1 he claimed to have had sex with over 100 women prior to filming.
- Sonny Keegan, 28, from Detroit, MI. Professional strip club DJ.
- Hero D. Protagonist, 26, software engineer from Austin, TX.
- The Colonel, 32, from Raleigh, NC. Adult on Autism Spectrum with something to prove.
- Johnny Black, 22, from Charleston, SC.

=== Female ===
- Blair Williams, 22, from Los Angeles, CA. She was a former church preschool teacher.
- Kaelin Blake, 23, from Winchester, KY.
- Adrian Lee Ray, 26, from Buffalo, NY. A Suicide Girl, in Episode 7 is discovered to have lied to the producers of the show, having shot a scene with James Deen.
- Khaya Peake, 23, from Brighton, UK.
- Veronica Vain, 23, from New York City.
- Sydney Gilmour, 22, a professional tattoo artist from Miami, FL.
- Dani Darko, 19, from Las Vegas.
- Allie Eve Knox, 26, from Dallas, TX, with a master's degree in anthropology. In Episode 1 she claimed to have had sex with four people prior to filming. In an interview for ABC News she claimed to have joined the show to make money in order to pay her student loans.

== Results ==
Contestant			Episode									
Name	Age	Hometown	1 (Note: The women won the challenge and they could cast votes to send one male contestant home. Three women voted against Donnie Rock, while one voted against Sonny Keegan. David Caspian received four votes from the women, eliminating him from the contest despite the judges' affection towards him.)	2 (Note: The women had a photoshoot done by Holly Randall and the judges chose Allie Eve Knox as the winner. Veronica Vain revealed she had been given an offer she couldn't refuse and wanted to leave the competition, so no contestant was eliminated. The judges invited David Caspian to join the guys in a strip club in this episode and learn how to dance as a male stripper.)	3	4 (Note: There was no elimination in this episode as the challenge was not complete and continues in the next episode. Allie Eve Knox, the winner of episode 2, is seen participating in a photoshoot by Holly Randall for Hustler magazine.)	5	6 (Note: There was no elimination in this episode as the challenge was not complete and continues in the next episode. Blair discovered that Adrian has previously acted in a professional porn film by James Deen, potentially disqualifying her from the contest.)	7	8 (Note: There was no elimination in this episode as the challenge was not complete and continues in the next episode.)	9	10 (Note: The challenge from the previous two episodes was concluded, with the winners being declared having the Sex Factor.)
Blair Williams	22	Los Angeles, CA	WIN	HIGH	SAFE	SAFE	SAFE	SAFE	SAFE	SAFE	SAFE	Winner
Donnie Rock	31	Denver, CO	LOW	SAFE	LOW	SAFE	SAFE	SAFE	SAFE	SAFE	SAFE	Winner
Allie Eve Knox	26	Dallas, TX	WIN	WIN	SAFE	SAFE	SAFE	SAFE	SAFE	SAFE	SAFE	Runner-Up
Johnny Black	22	Charleston, SC	SAFE	SAFE	LOW	SAFE	SAFE	SAFE	SAFE	SAFE	SAFE	Runner-Up
Hero D. Protagonist	26	Austin, TX	SAFE	SAFE	SAFE	SAFE	SAFE	SAFE	SAFE	SAFE	SAFE	Eliminated
Khaya Peake	23	Brighton, UK	WIN	SAFE	SAFE	SAFE	SAFE	SAFE	SAFE	SAFE	SAFE	Eliminated
Buddy Hollywood	26	Las Vegas, NV	SAFE	SAFE	SAFE	SAFE	LOW	SAFE	ELIM			
Adrian Lee Ray	26	Buffalo, NY	WIN	SAFE	LOW	SAFE	LOW	SAFE	DISQ			
Kaelin Blake	23	Winchester, KY	WIN	SAFE	LOW	SAFE	ELIM					
The Colonel	32	Raleigh, NC	SAFE	SAFE	SAFE	SAFE	ELIM					
Dani Darko	19	Las Vegas, NV	WIN	SAFE	ELIM							
Sonny Keegan	28	Detroit, MI	LOW	SAFE	ELIM							
Barry Newport	24	Orange County, CA	SAFE	SAFE	LEFT							
Sydney Gilmore	22	Miami, FL	WIN	SAFE	LEFT							
Veronica Vain	23	New York, NY	WIN	LEFT								
David Caspian	25	Bronx, NY	ELIM									

Legend
	Female
	Male
	The contestant won The Sex Factor
	The contestant was a runner-up.
	The contestant was eliminated in third place.
WIN	The contestant won the Elimination Challenge.
HIGH	The contestant was one of the best but did not win the challenge.
SAFE	The contestant was safe or did not receive votes.
LOW	The contestant was one of the worst, but was saved first.
LOW	The contestant was voted to go home by the winners or judges in the Elimination Challenge, but was not eliminated.
ELIM	The contestant was eliminated.
LEFT	The contestant left the competition despite not being eliminated.
DISQ	The contestant was disqualified from the competition
	The contestant did not compete in this episode.
