= USC Annenberg School for Communication and Journalism =

Private communication and journalism school at the University of Southern California

The USC Annenberg School for Communication and Journalism is a part of the University of Southern California in Los Angeles. It has 2,300 undergraduate and graduate students. Willow Bay is the Dean. Prof. Hector Amaya is the Director of the School of Communication, Prof. Gordon Stables serves as Director of the School of Journalism.

== History ==
The journalism program at USC dates back to 1916. In 1933, it became the School of Journalism within the USC College of Letters, Arts and Sciences. In 1971, the USC Annenberg School for Communication was founded, supported by an $8-million gift from Walter Annenberg. It was reorganized in 1994 to include the School of Journalism and the Department of Communication Arts.

In 2000, producer Norman Lear pledged $5 million to establish a multidisciplinary research and public policy center at the USC Annenberg School, focused on the impact of the entertainment on news, information, and other aspects of modern culture.

The school’s name officially changed to "USC Annenberg School for Communication and Journalism" in 2009.

The School publishes the International Journal of Communication, an open source academic journal featuring research from journalism, media and communication studies.

== Faculty ==
Faculty have included Pulitzer Prize-winning journalist Edwin O. Guthman, former national editor for the Los Angeles Times who taught at the USC Annenberg School for 20 years.

== Awards administered ==
The school presents several journalism awards:

- Everett M. Rogers Award for Achievement in Entertainment Education
- Selden Ring Award for Investigative Reporting
- USC Annenberg Walter Cronkite Award for Excellence in Television Political Journalism
- multiple USC Annenberg Health Journalism Fellowships, including one for California journalists, one opened nationally at Center for Health Journalism funded by The California Endowment, and one centered on data journalism

== Alumni ==
- Gabé Hirschowitz, Australian-American art dealer and lifestyles journalist
- Laila Mickelwait, American anti-sex trafficking activist, bestselling author, Founder/CEO of the Justice Defense Fund

== See also ==
- Annenberg School for Communication at the University of Pennsylvania
