= UK Adult Film and Television Awards =

UK Adult Film & TV Awards
- Date: 17 November 2006
- Location: London
- Country: United Kingdom

The UK Adult Film and Television Awards (UKAFTAs) were a short-lived annual awards ceremony for the adult industry in the United Kingdom, which ran for two years from 2006 to 2008. Redzone Pictures and adult video producer Phil Black organised the awards in an attempt to promote the adult film industry in the UK.

The inaugural awards show was held on 17 November 2006 at the Hammersmith Palais, London and was hosted by adult film performer and director Ben Dover. There were around thirty award categories, honouring performance, production, and technical achievements in film, television, and the Internet. Notable award nominees included the TV series The Secret Diary of a Call Girl, starring Billie Piper, which was nominated for "Best Soft Core Production" at the 29 November 2007 Awards.

The 2008 awards were the last to be held, with one commentator, in 2013, attributing the award's demise to insufficient financial backing or bad planning and promotion.

== 2006 winners ==
Performers:

- BGAFD Best Actress Award 2006 - Natalie Heck
- Best Female Actress Of The Year - Poppy Morgan
- Best Male Actor Of The Year - Pascal White
- Best Solo Scene by a Female Performer - Donna Marie
- Best Actor in a Gay Film - Fernando
- Lifetime Achievement Award - Ben Dover
- Best Supporting Actress - Suzie Best
- The Joe Adelman Best Female Newcomer - KazB
- Best Female Performer In An Amateur Film - Tracey Lain
- Best Supporting Male Actor - Mark Sloane
- Best Male Newcomer - Keni Styles
- Best Female Overseas Actress Of The Year - Rio Mariah
- Most Outrageous Female Performance - Emma-Louise (Circus Extreme)
- Best Female Performer in a Girl/Girl Scene - Donna Marie
- Best Female Performer in an Anal Scene - Alicia Rhodes
- Best Female Actress Blow Job Sex Scene - Sandie Caine

Production:

- Best Film - For Your Thighs Only (Doll Theatre)
- Best Director - Kendo
- Best Softcore Film - Real Euro Couples (One Eyed Jack Productions)
- Best Gay Film - French Heat (Corolo Productions)
- Best Transsexual Film - Jet Set (Fringe Dweller Productions)
- Best Amateur Film - Viewers Wives 47 (Your Choice Productions)
- Best Reality Porn Film - RealPunting II (Jay Kay Production)
- Best Gonzo Production - Jim Slip
- Best Online Scene - Jim Slip
- Best Soundtrack - For Your Thighs Only (Doll Theatre)
- Best Script - For Your Thighs Only (Doll Theatre)

== 2007 winners ==
Performers:

- Best Female Actress – Carmel Moore (Hug a Hoodie)
- Best Male Actor – Keiran Lee (Various)
- Lifetime Achievement Award – Cathy Barry
- Best Actor in a Gay Film – Kyle Price (ASBO Twinks)
- Best Supporting Male Actor – Keni Styles (Porn Date)
- Best Male Newcomer – Vince Velvet (Hug a Hoodie)
- Most Outrageous Female Performance – Lolly Badcock (Xperi-mental)
- Best Female Performer in an Amateur Film – Tracy Lain (Knob the Builder)
- Best Performer in a Girl/Girl Scene – Daisy Rock (Bound Gagged and Shagged)
- Best Female Performer in an Anal Scene – Jamie Brooks (Cream Bunz)
- BGAFD Female Performer of the Year (voted for online) – Isabel Ice
- Best Female Performance in an Oral Scene – Cindy Behr (Kitty Licks)
- Joe Adelman Award for Best New Starlet – Karlie Simon (Celebrity Shag)
- Best Overseas Female Performer – Carmella Bing
- Best Supporting Actress – Cyprus Isles (Pyjama Party)

Production:

- Best Film – Bondage Thoughts (Kendo/Erotic Flesh Productions)
- Best Gay Film – Supersize (Freshwave)
- Best Amateur Film – Knob the Builder (Freddy's World)
- Best Overseas Film – Breakin 'Em In 9 (Vouyer Media)
- Best Reality Porn Film – Hug a Hoodie (Anna Span)
- Best Gonzo Production – Don’t Kiss Me, Just Fuck Me (Nickelass Productions)
- Best Softcore Production – Hug a Hoodie (Anna Span)
- Best Director – Anna Span (Hug a Hoodie)
- Best Script – Dr Screw 2 (Paul Carder/Craig Kennedy)
- Best Original Soundtrack – Murder Mystery Weekend (Bluebird)
- Best Editing – Bondage Thoughts (XL/Erotic Flesh Productions)

TV and Internet:

- Pay-Per-View Channel of the Year – Playboy TV
- Best Online Scene – Rio and David (Real Couples)
- Free-To-View Presenter of the Year – Rio Lee (Sex Station)
- Pay-Per-View Series of the Year – Bound Gagged and Shagged (John Luton/Spice Extreme)
- Free-To-View Channel of the Year – Sex Station

== 2008 winners ==
Performers:

- Lifetime Achievement Award – Marino
- Best Female Actress – Keisha Kane
- Best Male Actor – Jason Romer
- Daily Sport Actress of the Year – Rennee Richards
- Best Supporting Actress – Isabelle Ice
- Best Female Newcomer (The Joe Aldman Award) – Michelle Moist
- Best Male Newcomer – John Janes
- Female Performer of the Year (BGAFD Award) – Cate Harrington
- Best Female Performer in an Amateur Film – Geogina Baille
- Most Outrageous Female Performance – Daisy Rock
- Best Solo Scene by a Female Performer – Leigh Logan
- Transsexual Performer of the Year – Joanna Jet
- Butter Would Melt Award – Katie Price (Jordan)

Production:

- Best Film – Satanic Slut 2 (Salvation Films)
- Best Director – Anna Span (Do the Business)
- Best Softcore Production – Petra Joy (Sensual Seduction)
- Best Editing – Get Your Rocks Off (Pumpkin Films)
- Best Original Soundtrack – Spanking Tomato - Road Trip 18 Esher
- Best Script – St Teeny Cums (Wicked Films)

TV and Internet:

- Pay Per View Channel of the Year- Television X
- Free to View Channel of the Year – Bang Babes
- Best TV Presenter of the Year – Nikki Lee
- Best Online Scene – Terry Stevens for Real Couples
- Best Online Film – Strap On Sex Tape (Strictly Broadband)
- Best Online Female Actress – Cathy Barry
- Best Online Male Actor – Pascel White
- Best Online Production Company – Killagram
