= Keiran Lee =

British pornographic actor, director and producer (born 1984)

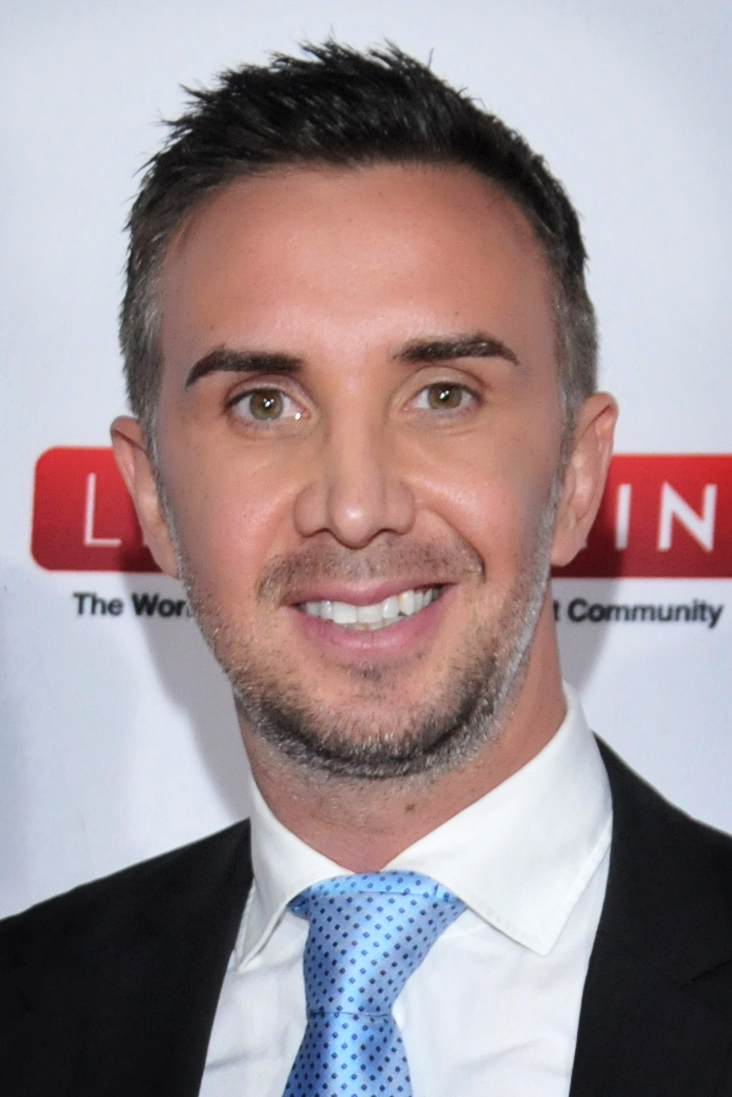
- Lee in January 2016
- Born: Adam Diksa; 15 January 1984 (age 42); Derby, England
- Other name: Princess
- Occupations: Actor; director; producer
- Years active: 2002–present
- Spouses: Puma Swede (m. 2009, divorced) Kirsten Price (m. 2013)
- Children: 3

Adam Diksa (born 15 January 1984), better known by his stage name Keiran Lee, is an English pornographic actor, director, and producer who works mainly for Brazzers. He is one of the highest-paid pornographic actors. He has received several awards, including an AVN Award for Favourite Male Performer and a UK Adult Film and Television Award for Best Male Actor.

== Early life ==
Lee was born Adam Diksa in the Littleover area of Derby on 15 January 1984, the son of an English mother and Indian father. He attended Saint Benedict Catholic Voluntary Academy in the Darley Abbey area of Derby. By the age of 18, he was working as a project manager for Network Rail.

== Career ==
Lee's career in porn began after his friends uploaded a naked picture of him to a swinging website. After seeing the post, a couple offered him a role in a porn film. He first performed in adult video in 2002 at the age of 18. He began freelancing in porn in England and then moved to the United States, where he signed an exclusive contract with Brazzers in 2005.

Lee performed in his first Brazzers video in 2008. In August 2011, Brazzers placed a billboard advertisement with a photo of Lee in a tank top and sunglasses on Sunset Boulevard. Dan Miller from XBIZ referred to it as "a landmark promotion for a male porn star". In 2012, it was reported that Brazzers had taken out an insurance policy with Lloyd's of London to insure Lee's penis for a reported $1 million. In October 2013, he made his feature film directorial debut with Hot Chicks Meet Big Fangs for Digital Playground.

In 2016, Lee appeared as a mentor and judge on The Sex Factor, an online reality series featuring 16 men and women competing for $1 million and a three-year porn contract. Lee, along with fellow porn stars Lexi Belle, Remy LaCroix, and Tori Black, would offer advice and judge the contestants throughout the competition. The series was critically panned, with reviewers saying Lee had "confused the deadpan tell-it-like-it-is judging technique of real TV with just straight up being a dickhead" while calling the judges in general "stilted" and "hard to watch".

As of May 2020, Lee has appeared in 1,553 videos for Brazzers, more than any other performer. He was inducted into the AVN Hall of Fame in 2022.

== Personal life ==
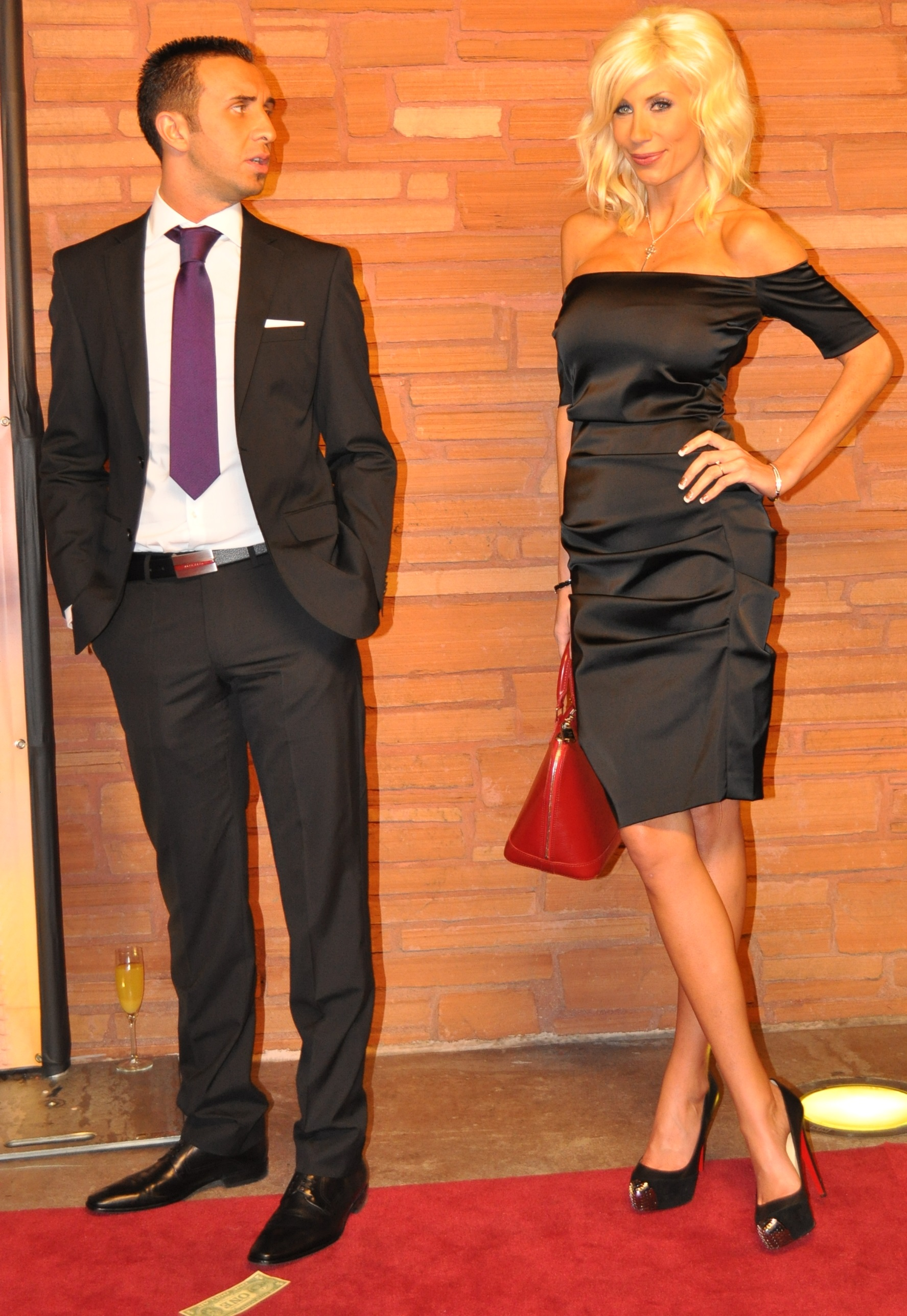
Lee with then-wife Puma Swede in 2011

Lee married Swedish pornographic actress Puma Swede in 2009. They divorced at an unknown date. He married American pornographic actress Kirsten Price in 2013. They have three children.

Lee is a supporter of his hometown football team Derby County FC and has said that he "schedules his whole life around" it. In 2011, while playing soccer for Hollywood United FC, he had to be hospitalised after breaking his jaw in two places.

== Select filmography ==
Television
Year	Title	Role	Notes
2012	The Jerry Springer Show	Sunit Patel	1 episode
2016	The Sex Factor	Judge	10 episodes

=== Movies ===
As an actor:

- Nasty Intentions (2009)
- Filthy Habits (2010)
- No Way Out (2014)
- Kill Bill (2015)
- In the Ass at Last (2016)

As a director:

- Hot Chicks Meet Big Fangs (2013)

== Awards and nominations ==
During his career, Lee has won two awards from 49 nominations. Some notable awards and nominations:

List of accolades received by Keiran Lee
Awards and nominations
Award	Won	Nominated
AVN Awards	1	12
XRCO Awards	0	3
XBIZ Awards	0	2
UK Adult Film and Television Awards	1	0
- Total numbers of wins and nominations
Totals	2	17
- References

Award	Year	Nominated work	Category	Result	Ref.
AVN Award	2009	Nasty Intention	Best Sex Scene in a Foreign-Shot Film	Nominated	
AVN Award	2010	Keiran Lee	Male Performer of the Year	Nominated	
AVN Award	2010	Filthy Habits	Most Outrageous Sex Scene	Nominated	
AVN Award	2010	Keiran Lee	Unsung Male Performer of the Year	Nominated	
AVN Award	2011	Keiran Lee	Male Performer of the Year	Nominated	
AVN Award	2012	Keiran Lee	Male Performer of the Year	Nominated	
AVN Award	2013	Keiran Lee	Male Performer of the Year	Nominated	
AVN Award	2014	Keiran Lee	Male Performer of the Year	Nominated	
AVN Award	2015	Keiran Lee	Male Performer of the Year	Nominated	
AVN Award	2017	In the Ass at Last	Best Anal Sex Scene	Nominated	
AVN Award	2017	Keiran Lee	Favorite Male Performer	Won	
AVN Award	2017	Keiran Lee	Male Performer of the Year	Nominated	
AVN Award	2019	Keiran Lee	Male Performer of the Year	Nominated	
UK Adult Film and Television Award	2007	Keiran Lee	Best Male Actor	Won	
XBIZ Award	2014	Keiran Lee	Male Performer of the Year	Nominated	
XBIZ Award	2017	Keiran Lee	Male Performer of the Year	Nominated	
XRCO Award	2013	Keiran Lee	Male Performer of the Year	Nominated	
XRCO Award	2015	Keiran Lee	Best Director (Web)	Nominated	
XRCO Award	2017	Keiran Lee	Best Director (Web)	Nominated	

== See also ==
- List of British pornographic actors
