= Shakedown (2018 film) =

- Directed by: Leilah Weinraub
- Release date: February 17, 2018 (Berlin International Film Festival)
- Country: United States

Shakedown is a 2018 American documentary film directed by Leilah Weinraub. The film centers around a Los Angeles black-lesbian strip club of the same name in its heyday from 2002 to 2004. The film premiered in 2018 and was screened at film festivals throughout North America and Europe. In March 2020 it was released via digital streaming on Pornhub as the first non-pornographic film on the website.

== Synopsis ==
The film documents a black lesbian strip club called Shakedown in Los Angeles from 2002 to the time it was shut down by police in 2004. It follows the staff including Ronnie, the club's owner and promoter, and some of the dancers.

== Release ==
The film premiered at the 2018 Berlinale and was later screened at various art institutions and film festivals including the Tate, London; ICA, London; MoMA PS1, New York; Centre d’Art Contemporain, Geneva; True/False Film Festival, Missouri; Sheffield Doc/Fest, England; Images Festival, Toronto; Frameline Film Festival, San Francisco and Gavin Brown's Enterprise, New York. A shorter version was screened as part of the 2017 Whitney Biennial.

In March 2020 it was released by the pornographic website Pornhub as "the first ever non-adult film" available on the site. It will be available on Pornhub throughout the month of March 2020 only. Starting in May 2020, Shakedown started streaming on the Criterion Channel as part of its “Tell Me: Women’s Stories, Women Filmmakers” series.

== Production ==
Weinraub began shooting the film in 2002 when she was 23 years old. She was initially brought to the club by a friend and was so amazed by it that she asked for a job there, eventually being hired as a photographer and videographer. She shot over 400 hours of footage. The film shows the strip club's heyday, between 2002 and 2004 when the club's main venue was shut down by Los Angeles police who cracked down on nude performers in the city.

== Reception ==
Devon Yarbrough of Vox magazine called it "an honest, multi-faceted film about freedom, strife and human connection" and noted that while the film contains funny moments it maintains a serious tone. Steve Erickson of Gay City News compared the film to Paris is Burning and Derek Jarman's Will You Dance with Me?
