= Cherie DeVille =

American pornographic film actress (born 1978/1979)

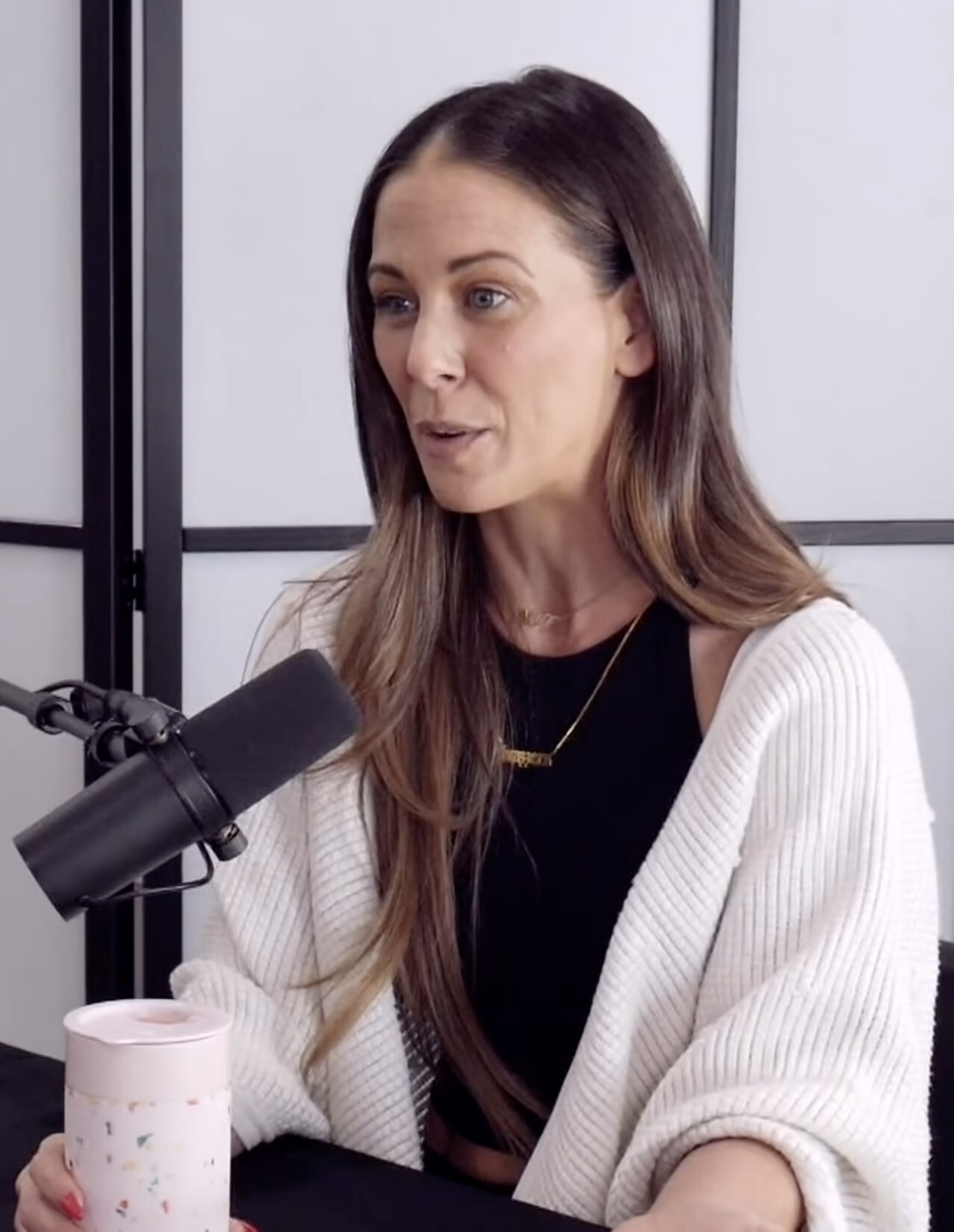
- DeVille in 2021
- Born: 1978 or 1979 (age 46–47); Durham, North Carolina, U.S.
- Education: Doctor of Physical Therapy
- Occupations: Pornographic film actress; physical therapist
- Years active: 2011–present
- Awards: AVN Award × 7; Adult Empire Award; Brazzers Hall of Fame; Fleshbot Award; Pornhub Award × 4; Urban X Hall of Fame; XBIZ Award × 6; XCritic Award × 3; XRCO Award × 2

Cherie DeVille (born 1978 or 1979) is an American pornographic film actress and writer. A doctor of physical therapy, she entered the adult-film industry in her early thirties and has since appeared in hundreds of scenes, marketing herself online as "the internet's step-mom." DeVille briefly sought the United States presidency in 2020 on a ticket with rapper Coolio, using the slogan "Make America Fucking Awesome Again". She ended her bid in 2019, endorsing senator Bernie Sanders's campaign.

== Early life and career ==
DeVille was born in Durham, North Carolina. She earned a doctorate in physical therapy and worked as a licensed clinician in Tennessee until 2011. After moving to California at age 32, she began performing in adult films. As of 2016, she operated her own physical therapy practice while performing in pornographic films in Los Angeles. By 2018 she was shooting roughly 200 scenes a year. Her on-screen persona and active presence on platforms such as OnlyFans led industry writers to dub her "the internet's step-mom".

== Activism ==
In 2017, DeVille announced that she was running for president of the United States as an independent candidate. Using the campaign slogan "Make America Fucking Awesome Again", she chose rapper Coolio as her vice-presidential running mate. DeVille positioned herself as a sex-positive, cannabis-friendly candidate who favored net neutrality protections. In January 2019, she suspended her campaign and publicly endorsed senator Bernie Sanders for president.

DeVille urged Utah's governor Spencer Cox to veto a 2021 "porn-blocker" bill on First Amendment grounds. The legislation would require new smartphones and tablet computers to block sexually explicit material. After the state enacted legislation in 2023 that required pornographic websites to verify the age of visitors and allowed parents to sue websites for damages, Utah visitors to Pornhub were shown a video message by DeVille arguing that the law would put users' privacy at risk.

== Other media appearances ==
In 2022, DeVille appeared in an advertisement for canned-water brand Liquid Death, urging viewers to avoid single-use plastic packaging. The same year, DeVille produced an instructional adult scene designed to steer men away from speculative cryptocurrency investments toward more stable financial instruments.

DeVille appeared in the 2023 Netflix documentary film Money Shot: The Pornhub Story and has written for Rolling Stone and The Daily Beast. According to 2018 interview, DeVille continues to practice physical therapy part-time and describes her politics as "left-leaning libertarian."

== Awards ==
DeVille has received multiple MILF-category performer honors from major adult-industry organizations, including AVN, XBIZ and XRCO.

- 2017 XBIZ Award – MILF Performer of the Year
- 2017 XRCO Award – MILF of the Year
- 2018 AVN Award – MILF Performer of the Year
- 2018 XRCO Award – MILF of the Year
- 2019 AVN Award – MILF Performer of the Year
- 2019 XCritic Award – Best MILF
- 2020 AVN Award – Most Outrageous Sex Scene
- 2021 AVN Award – MILF Performer of the Year
- 2021 XBIZ Award – MILF Performer of the Year
- 2021 XBIZ Award – Best Sex Scene - Trans
- 2021 XCritic Award – Best MILF
- 2021 Fleshbot Award – Best Total Package (Female)
- 2021 Adult Empire Award – Pornstar of the Year
- 2022 XCritic Award – Best MILF
- 2022 Pornhub Award – Top MILF Performer
- 2023 AVN Award – MILF Performer of the Year
- 2023 XBIZ Award – Performer of the Year
- 2023 Pornhub Award – Top MILF Performer
- 2024 Pornhub Award – Favorite MILF
- 2024 Urban X Hall of Fame
- 2024 Brazzers Hall of Fame
- 2025 AVN Award – MILF Performer of the Year
- 2025 AVN Award – Best Foursome/Orgy Scene
- 2025 XMA Award – Best Sex Scene - Feature Movie
- 2025 XMA Award – Best Sex Scene - Orgy/Group
- 2025 Pornhub Award – Top MILF Performer
