= Keni Styles =

British pornographic film actor (born 1981)

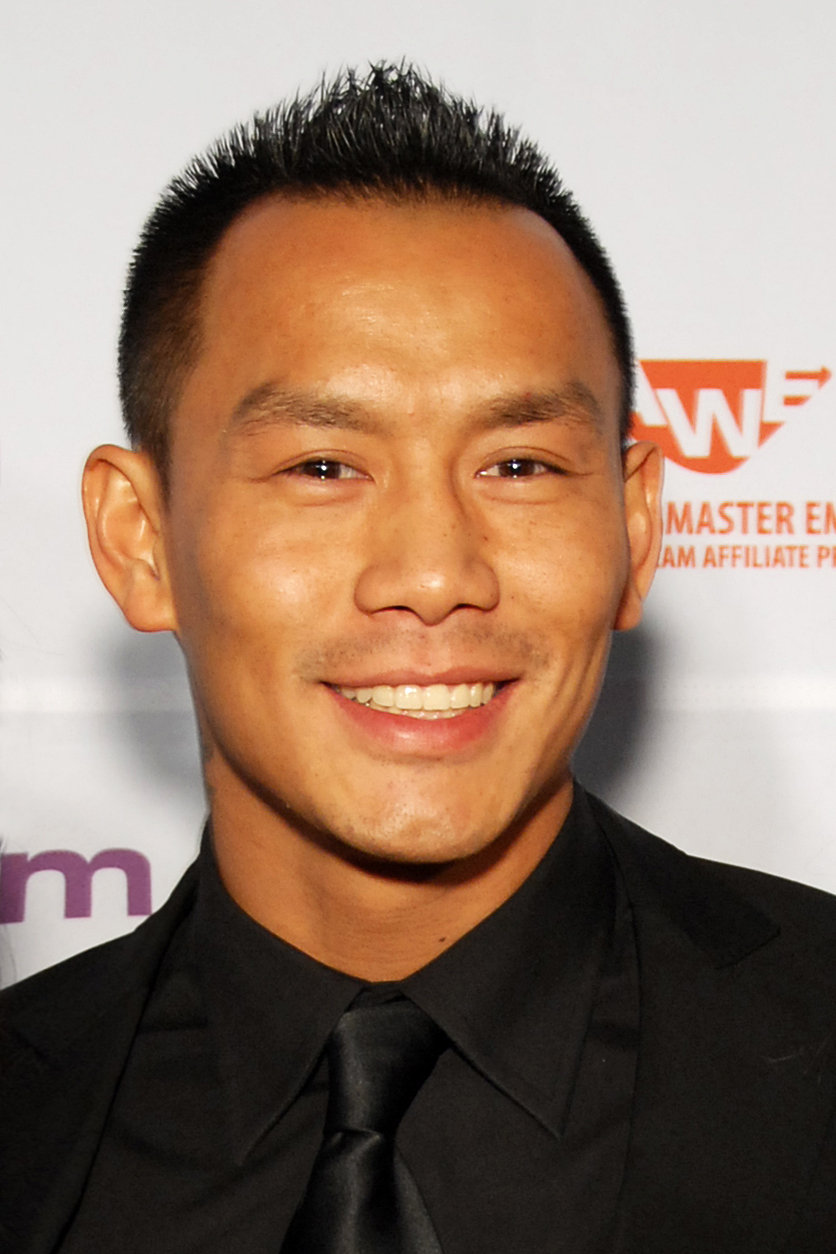
- Styles at the 2011 XBIZ Awards
- Born: Thailand
- Occupation: Pornographic actor
- Years active: 2006–2015

Keni Styles (born 27 May 1981) is a British-French-Thai former pornographic actor.

== Early life ==
Styles was born in Thailand to a single mother who worked as a sex worker. They two later moved to the United Kingdom after she married a British national. Once the marriage ended, his mother returned to Thailand, leaving Styles at an orphanage. He remained in the orphanage until the age of 16.

Styles took up boxing, becoming a regional champion as a teen. He was considered but ultimately passed on to represent Team Britain in the Youth Olympic Games. He later joined the British Army and served in Northern Ireland, Bosnia, Kosovo twice, and Iraq twice during his seven years of active duty.

== Career ==
After leaving the army, he entered the pornography industry, starting a company called "Superman Stamina". Styles was active in pornographic movies since August 2006, and retired in 2015. He first found steady work in Eastern Europe, relocating to live in both Prague and Budapest. In January 2010, Styles moved to Los Angeles. He is regarded as the first heterosexual Asian male porn star in American pornography by some. In July 2015, Styles announced his retirement from the porn industry on his blog, KeniCamz.

== Select filmography ==
| Year | Title | Role | Notes | Ref. |
|---|---|---|---|---|
| 2009 | The Human Sexipede | Katsuro | Parody of The Human Centipede (First Sequence) | |
| 2009 | Pure | Kichi | | |
| 2010 | This Ain't Star Trek XXX 2: The Butterfly Effect | Sulu | Parody of Star Trek | |
| 2010 | Malice in Lalaland | Chester Katz | | |

== Awards ==
AVN Awards
| Year | Nominated work and artist | Category | Result | Ref. |
|---|---|---|---|---|
| 2009 | Keni Styles | Best Male Newcomer | Nominated | |
| 2010 | Pure | Best Actor | Nominated | |
| 2010 | Pure | Best Couples Sex Scene | Nominated | |
| 2010 | Rocco's Dirty Dreams 8 | Best Sex Scene in a Foreign-Shot Production | Nominated | |
| 2011 | Keni Styles | Male Performer of the Year | Nominated | |
| 2011 | Malice in Lalaland | Best Couples Sex Scene | Nominated | |
| 2011 | Malice in Lalaland | Best Supporting Actor | Nominated | |
| 2012 | Joanna Angel and James Deen's Summer Vacation | Best Double Penetration Sex Scene | Nominated | |
| 2012 | Joanna Angel and James Deen's Summer Vacation | Best Group Sex Scene | Nominated | |
| 2012 | Rough Sex 3: Adriana's Dangerous Mind | Best Group Sex Scene | Nominated | |
| 2012 | Rough Sex 3: Adriana's Dangerous Mind | Best Three-Way Sex Scene (G/B/B) | Nominated | |
| 2015 | Lola, Dressage En Orgy | Best Group Sex Scene | Nominated | |

Erotic Awards
| Year | Nominated work and artist | Category | Result | Ref. |
|---|---|---|---|---|
| 2008 | Keni Styles | Best Porn Artist | Won | |

UK Adult Film Awards
| Year | Nominated work and artist | Category | Result | Ref. |
|---|---|---|---|---|
| 2006 | Keni Styles | Best Male Newcomer | Won | |
| 2007 | Keni Styles | Best Supporting Male Actor | Won | |

XBIZ Awards
| Year | Nominated work and artist | Category | Result | Ref. |
|---|---|---|---|---|
| 2010 | Pure | Acting Performance of the Year - Male | Nominated | |
| 2011 | Keni Styles | Male Performer of the Year | Nominated | |
| 2011 | Malice in Lalaland | Acting Performance of the Year - Male | Won | |

XRCO Awards
| Year | Nominated work and artist | Category | Result | Ref. |
|---|---|---|---|---|
| 2010 | Pure | Single Performance - Actor | Nominated | |

== See also ==
- List of British pornographic actors
