= Gabé Hirschowitz =

Australian-American art dealer, author and lifestyle journalist

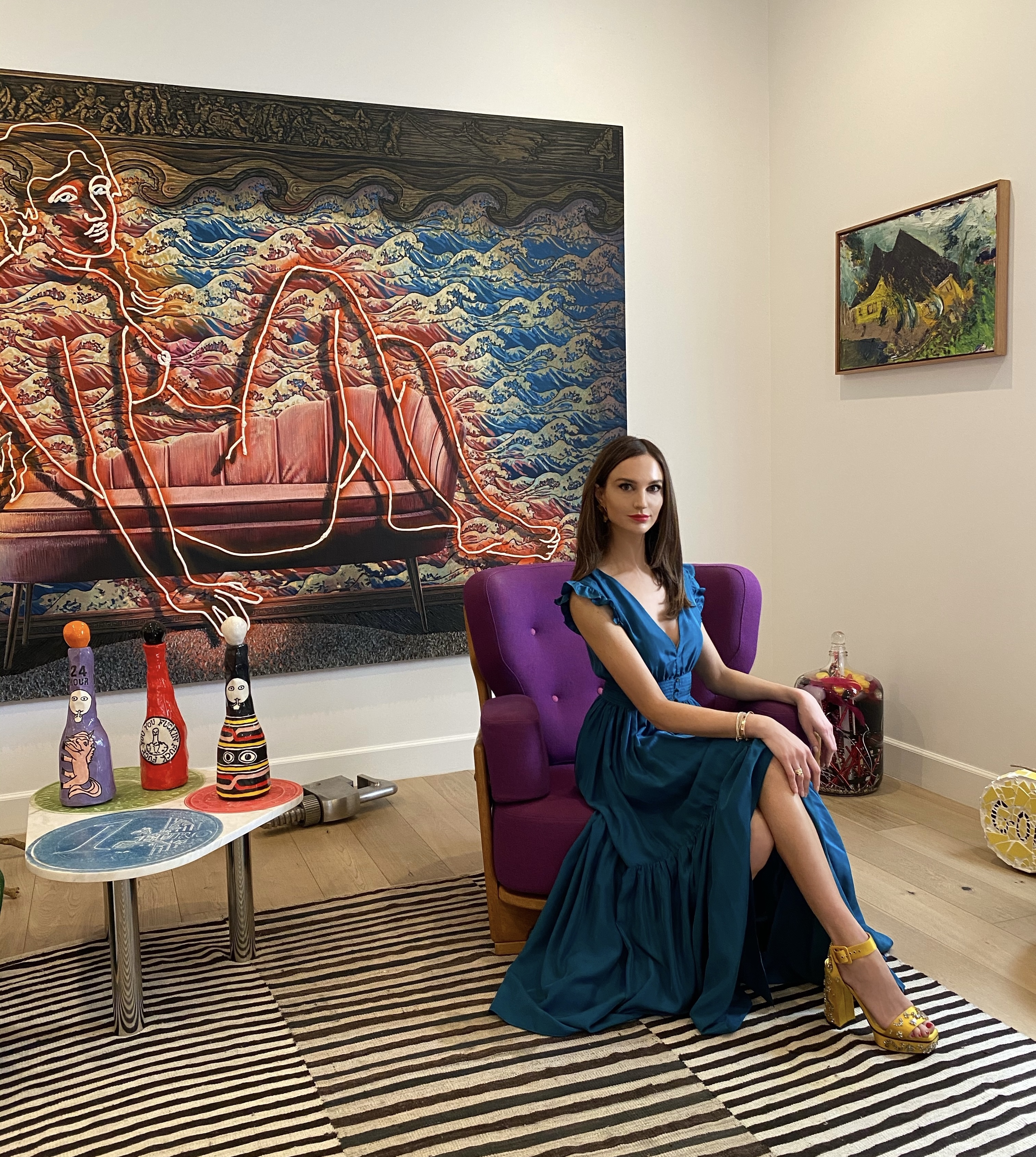
A 2022 portrait of Hirschowitz

Gabé Braunstein (née Hirschowitz) is an Australian-American art dealer, author, and lifestyle journalist.

== Early and personal life ==
Born in Sydney, Hirschowitz was raised in Los Angeles, California. She was educated at Brentwood School (Los Angeles) and later attended USC Annenberg School for Communication and Journalism where she attained a B.A. in Communications with a minor in Psychology in 2008.

During her time at university, Hirschowitz undertook internships with several journalistic publications, including editorial positions at Teen Vogue and Vogue Italia, and subsequently worked for notable fashion houses Carolina Herrera and Nina Ricci. Following this, Hirschowitz moved to New York City, though she would continue to split her time between New York and Los Angeles following the move.

== Foundation/philanthropic work and writing ==
After college, Hirschowitz was employed at the Museum of Contemporary Art, Los Angeles. Concurrently, she headed several charity initiatives, co-founding the Vista Del Mar Leadership Advisory Board in LA in 2014 and The UNICEF Next Generation Art Party in 2015.

During this time, Braunstein also began occasionally writing for various online and print arts and culture publications, including MyDomaine.com, C Magazine, LA Confidential, eventually also contributing to Artnet and Vogue.

In November 2023, Hirschowitz released her debut children's book titled "The Adventures of Gabriella Umbrella: Grandmother's Garden." The book pays tribute to her grandparents.

== Galerie Perrie online gallery ==
Hirschowitz has achieved prominence in the international art world, receiving attention in the art and fashion press from the likes of ArtNet and Vogue—as well as from numerous others—for founding one of the Internet's first traditionally curated online art galleries, Galerie Perrie, in 2021.

The impetus for Galerie Perrie's founding came as a result of the 2019-2022 COVID-19 pandemic after Hirschowitz had spent nearly a decade working as a private art consultant and art buyer, in addition to taking on numerous leadership roles in art philanthropy.

In a 2022 interview with her, ArtNet Vice President Sophie Neuendorf named Hirschowitz "one of the contemporary art world’s most plugged-in young consultants" who has "set a new standard in the art-collecting world."

When asked what drew her to the art world, Hirschowitz has been quoted by the New York Times as stating, "More than any other human endeavor, art has a unique ability to communicate, provoke thought and inspire change across vast distances and over immense periods of time," adding that "(art) is how we know ourselves and others."

== Awards ==
Hirschowitz was awarded the President's Volunteer Service Award by Barack Obama in 2016 for her efforts supporting UNICEF Tap Project.
