= Leilah Weinraub =

American filmmaker, conceptual artist and former CEO

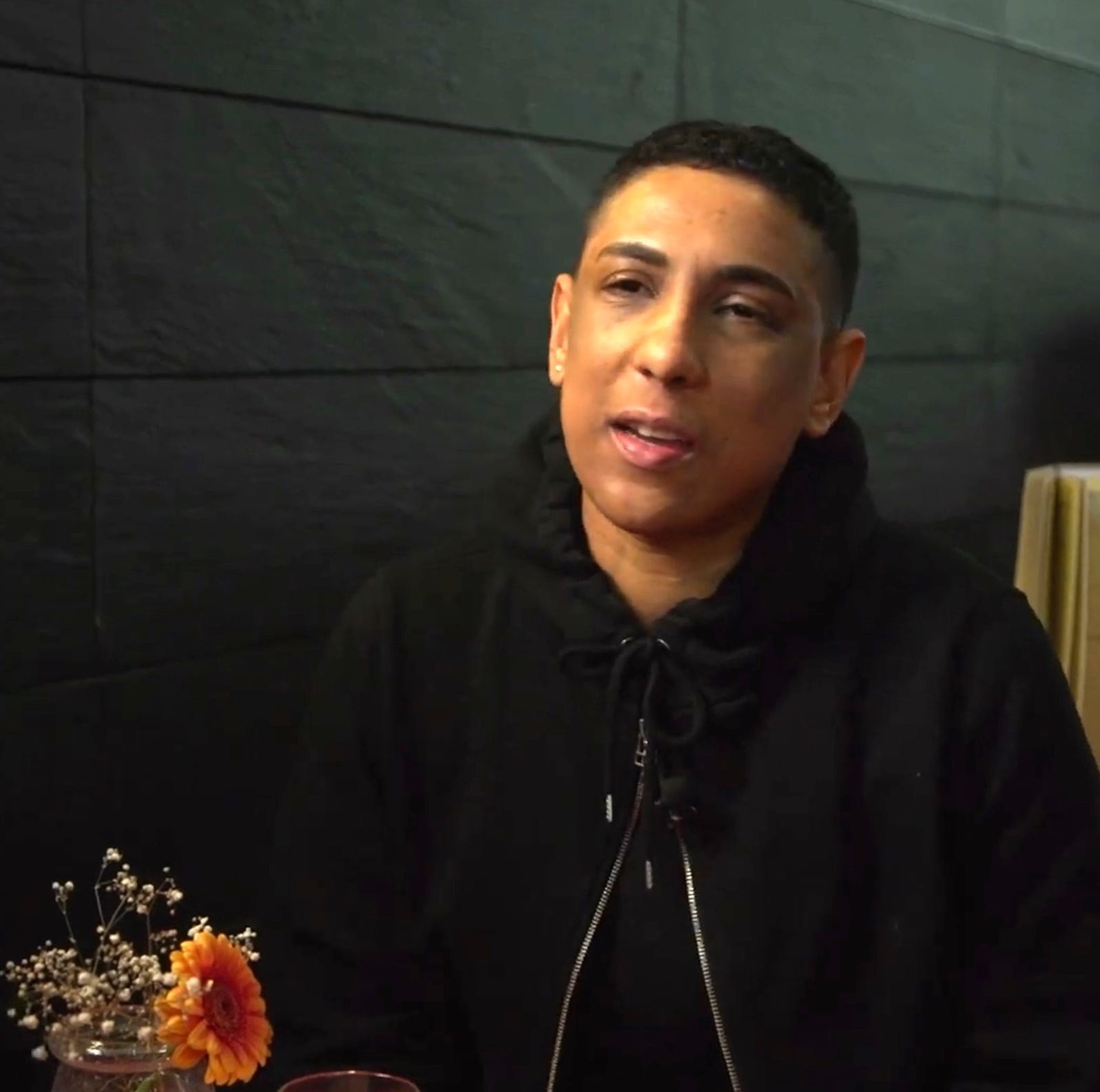
- 2018
- Born: 1979 (age 46–47); Los Angeles, California
- Education: Antioch College, Bard College
- Known for: Hood by Air
- Notable work: SHAKEDOWN (2018)

Leilah Weinraub (born 1979) is an American filmmaker, conceptual artist, and the former chief executive officer of the fashion brand Hood By Air. In 2018, she was named a Sundance Institute Art of Nonfiction Fellow.

== Biography ==
Weinraub was born in Los Angeles to an African-American textile designer mother from Compton and a Jewish pediatrician father from Fort Wayne, Indiana.

Weinraub attended one year at an agricultural high school in Israel before returning to the United States and legally emancipating herself from her parents. She later attended Antioch College and dropped out of the film program at Bard College.

== Career ==
In 1998, Weinraub met American History X director Tony Kaye while working at the Los Angeles Boutique Maxfield's. In exchange for Kaye paying her Antioch tuition, Weinraub assisted him on his project Lake of Fire.

=== Shakedown ===
In 2002—at the age of 23—Weinraub began shooting Shakedown, a Black lesbian strip club in the Mid-City neighborhood of Los Angeles. Over the course of 6 years, Weinraub accumulated over 400 hours of footage. The resulting documentary feature, Shakedown, premiered at the 2018 Berlinale and has subsequently been screened at various art institutions and film festivals including the Tate, London; ICA, London; MoMA PS1, New York; Centre d’Art Contemporain, Geneva; True/False Film Festival, Missouri; Sheffield Doc/Fest, England; Images Festival, Toronto; Frameline Film Festival, San Francisco and Gavin Brown's Enterprise, New York. A shorter version was screened as part of the 2017 Whitney Biennial.

In March 2020, the film was released on the website Pornhub, the first non-pornographic film to be shown there.

=== Hood by Air ===
In 2012, Weinraub began working on the critically acclaimed fashion label Hood By Air, eventually taking on the title of chief executive officer. She held this position until the brand's hiatus in 2017. Weinraub was openly skeptical of the brand's celebrity endorsements and kept the company closed to outside investors.

== See also ==
- List of female film and television directors
- List of lesbian filmmakers
- List of LGBT-related films directed by women
