= Laila Mickelwait =

American anti-sex trafficking activist (born 1982)

Laila Mickelwait is an American anti-sex trafficking activist and CEO who founded the Justice Defense Fund. She first began her work in 2006 and founded the Traffickinghub movement to "shut down Pornhub" for the distribution and monetization of sexual crime in 2020.

Mickelwait's Traffickinghub petition to "shut down Pornhub and hold its executives accountable for aiding trafficking" gathered more than two million signatures from 192 countries. The Sunday Times reported that Mickelwait's campaign played a role in major credit-card and payment companies (including Visa, Mastercard and Discover) cutting off payment processing for Pornhub's then parent company, MindGeek, and Pornhub removing content from unverified users, which had accounted for over 80 percent of the site's content, totaling over 30 million images and 10 million videos in what Financial Times called "probably the biggest takedown of content in internet history."

On July 23, 2024, Penguin Random House published Mickelwait's memoir about her attempt to shut down Pornhub titled Takedown: Inside the Fight to Shut Down Pornhub for Child Abuse, Rape, and Sex Trafficking. On July 31, 2024, Takedown ranked No. 37 on USA Today's list of the 150 best-selling books across all genres.

Mickelwait has shared her work through media appearances and interviews on platforms and programs, including CNBC's Squawk Box with Andrew Ross Sorkin, Theo Von's This Past Weekend, The Jordan Peterson Podcast, The Jordan Harbinger Podcast, and numerous others. Her work and writing has also been featured in outlets such as the New York Times,The New Yorker, USA Today, The Sunday Times, Newsweek, Washington Post, New York Post, among others.

== Early life and education ==
Mickelwait received her Master of Public Diplomacy degree from the Annenberg School for Communication and the Dornsife School of International Relations at the University of Southern California in Los Angeles in conjunction with the U.S. Department of State. She then interned at the United Nations in Geneva, Switzerland, before becoming the Director of Policy and Public Affairs and subsequently the Director of Abolition for the US-based nonprofit Christian advocacy organization, Exodus Cry.

In 2020, Mickelwait founded the Justice Defense Fund and has served as its CEO since its inception. The organization's stated mission is to "empower survivors of tech-facilitated sex trafficking, child sexual abuse material (CSAM), and image-based sexual abuse to pursue justice through strategic litigation and advocacy." It also states that it works to advance support for "governmental and corporate policy reforms aimed at preventing online sexual crime."
