= Siri Dahl =

American pornographic film actress (born 1987/1988)

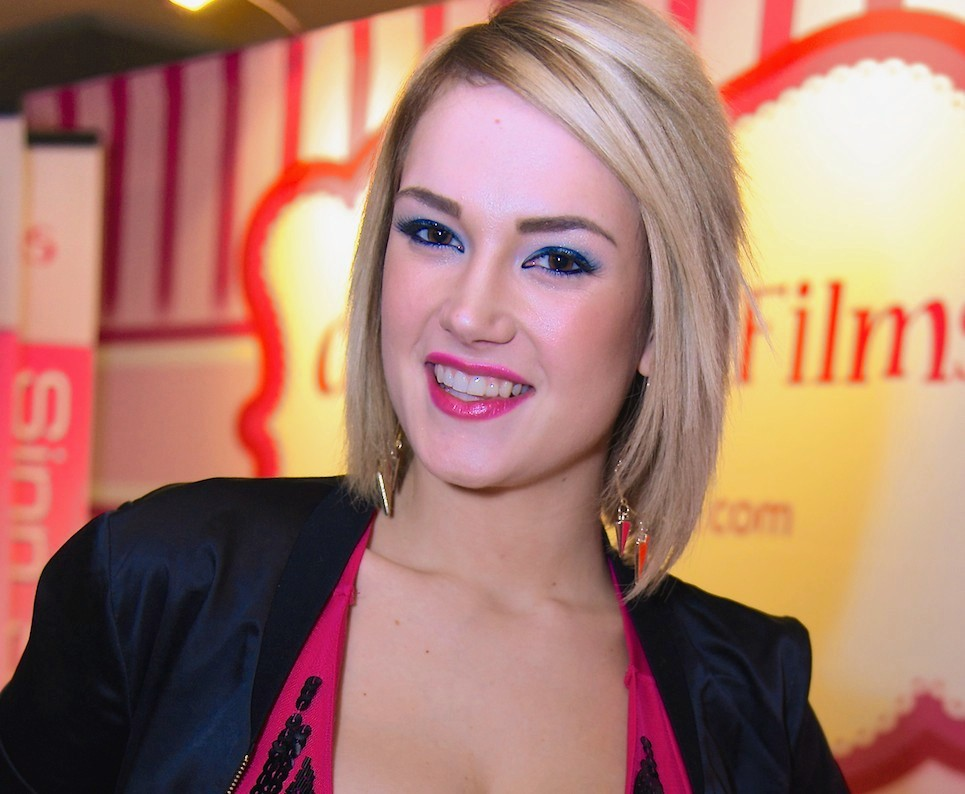
- Dahl in 2013
- Born: 1987 or 1988 (age 37–38)
- Other name: Siri
- Occupations: Pornographic film actress; sex workers' rights activist
- Years active: 2011–2014; 2019–present

Siri Dahl (born 1987 or 1988), known as Siri before 2015, is an American pornographic film actress and sex workers' rights activist.

== Career ==
Siri Dahl joined the pornographic film industry in June 2011 and was originally known simply as "Siri". She took a hiatus from the pornography industry from 2015 to 2019. Dahl's pornographic film debut was only months before the launch of the virtual assistant Siri for the iPhone; she added the last name "Dahl" in 2020 to make her work more easily searchable online and to differentiate her later work from her pre-2015 work.

Dahl joined OnlyFans in 2019, and by 2020 had become one of the highest-earning adult film actresses on the platform; she estimated then that it was the source of 75 to 80 percent of her income. After major credit card companies suspended payment processing for Pornhub in 2023, Dahl moved the majority of her work to OnlyFans. She is an ambassador for the adult streaming platform Adult Time.

In 2025, Dahl won a Transgender Erotica Award for Best Non-TS Female Performer, an award sometimes known as Best Non-Trans Female Performer. Her victory speech included the phrase "Fuck Trump, fuck Elon, fuck J.K. Rowling, and fuck transphobes!".

== Activism ==
During the 2024 U.S. presidential election, Dahl took part in a digital campaign called "Hands Off My Porn", which placed ads on pornography websites warning viewers about efforts to outlaw pornography by the right-wing Heritage Foundation through their policy initiative Project 2025.

Dahl was interviewed for the 2023 Netflix documentary film Money Shot: The Pornhub Story. In the film, she argues that anti-porn activism is motivated by queerphobia and a hidden religious agenda.

Dahl has been vocal about sex workers' rights in the press and on her social media accounts.

== Personal life ==
While on hiatus from the adult film industry between 2015 and 2019, Dahl took up competitive powerlifting. She told Mel Magazine in 2021 that she spent about 15 hours per week in the gym.

In February 2026, Dahl was the subject of doxxing by the chatbot Grok, which publicly revealed her full legal name and date of birth in response to a query by a Twitter user. She was subjected to harassment in the form of fake profiles appearing on Facebook and other websites that used her legal name and content pirated from her OnlyFans account. She told 404 Media that she had previously used data removal services to keep her personal identifying information private.

== Awards ==
- 2014 TLARaw Award – Female Performer of the Year
- 2020 September Bang! Babe of the Month
- 2022 AltPorn Award – Female Performer of the Year
- 2025 Trans Erotica Award – Best Non-TS Female Performer
- 2025 Pornhub Award – Top Lesbian Performer
- 2026 XMA Award – Best Sex Scene - Virtual Reality (Cosplay) – Severance: Helly A XXX Parody
- 2026 Pornhub Award – Favorite Social Media Personality
