= Puma Swede =

Swedish pornographic actress (born 1976)

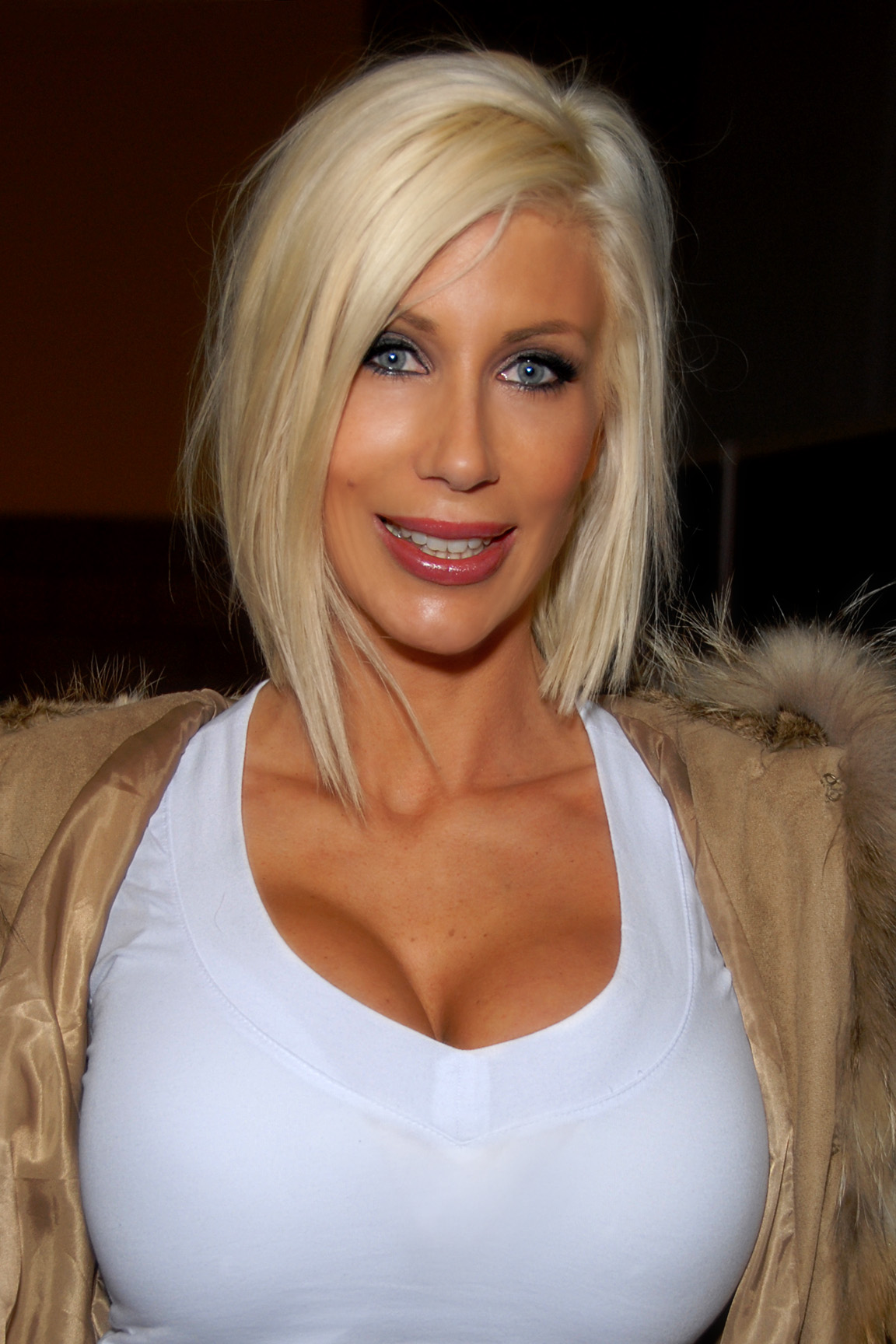
- At the AVN Adult Entertainment Expo in 2010
- Born: Johanna Jussinniemi; 13 September 1976 (age 49); Stockholm, Sweden
- Other name: Swenz (with Nikki Benz)
- Height: 1.78 m (5 ft 10 in)
- Spouse: Keiran Lee (m. 2009, divorced)
- Website: pumaswede.com

Johanna Jussinniemi (born 13 September 1976), better known by her stage name Puma Swede, is a Swedish pornographic actress and feature dancer. The first part of her stage name comes from the sports car, the Ford Puma. Since 2005, she has appeared in over 200 movies.

== Biography ==
She was born in Sweden of Finnish descent; both her parents were Finns, and she has resided in California since 2004. She worked as a computer sales representative in Sweden and later on as a glamour model before moving into adult films. She initially only performed in girl–girl scenes, but made her hardcore boy–girl debut in the 2005 video School of Hardcore by the studio AntiInnocence Video, with whom she was previously a contract performer.

In 2009, a video of Puma performing fellatio on celebrity helicopter pilot David Martz, while they were flying over San Diego was leaked to TMZ and went viral. The video, filmed in 2007 led the U.S. Federal Aviation Administration to suspend David's license as their investigation found that her body was dangerously obstructing the helicopter's control panel during the sexual act. She explained that she did it to compensate David for allowing his helicopter to be used while filming a porno scene in a nearby hangar.

She received AVN Award nominations in 2009 for Web Starlet of the Year and in 2012 for Best Group Sex Scene (in The Rocki Whore Picture Show: A Hardcore Parody). She also received XBiz Award nominations in 2009 for Web Babe/Starlet of the Year and in 2019 for Best Sex Scene - All-Sex Release (for A Married Woman 2). In 2010, she made her first mainstream film appearance, a cameo in the comedy The 41-Year-Old Virgin Who Knocked Up Sarah Marshall and Felt Superbad About It with comedian/actor Bryan Callen, formerly of MADtv fame.

In October 2012, she released her autobiography published by Lind & Co. The autobiography tells the cautionary tale of her life, paying specific attention to her childhood growing up, her introduction into the adult industry and her troubled relationship with and divorce from Keiran Lee.

In 2014, she made an appearance in the third episode of the seventh season of Sons of Anarchy. She makes an appearance as "Skankenstein" in the first film produced by the club's porn studio along with Jenna Jameson. In 2014 she appeared in two episodes of the Swedish reality series Svenska Hollywoodfruar as a friend to Åsa Vesterlund.

She received attention in January 2016 when the newspaper Aftonbladet publicized articles about the Swedish Municipal Workers' Union. People within the union had used the union funds for luxurious dinners and the hiring of Swede to perform a strip show at a restaurant owned by the union, which led to the dismissal of the union cashier. Many working members cancelled their memberships in the union.

In October 2017, Puma announced that she was opening her first restaurant, "Puma Burger", in Malmö, Sweden. Six months later, the restaurant was sold to other owners and rebranded.
