= The Logic =

Canadian news website

- Type: News website
- Format: Online Newspaper
- Founder: David Skok
- Editor: Jordan Timm
- Associate editor: April Fong
- Founded: 2018
- Headquarters: Toronto, Ontario, Canada
- Website: thelogic.co

The Logic is a subscription-based Canadian news outlet focused on the "innovation economy," which has been compared to The Information.

== History ==
The website was founded in June 2018 by David Skok, who was previously associate editor for Toronto Star, managing editor and vice-president of digital for the Boston Globe, and director of digital for Global News.

When the website was first launched, Moira Weigel, co-founder and editor of Logic, an American technology magazine launched in March 2017, took issue with the similarity of the names.

== Activities ==
The Logic has reported extensively on business in Canada, most notably reporting on Sidewalk Labs and their Waterfront Toronto project. Their reporting is paywalled, and requires a subscription starting at $300. In May 2019, Postmedia acquired a minor stake in The Logic, and began to republish stories on the Financial Post's website and newspaper, along with advertising the news outlets subscriptions.
