= Pornhub =

Canadian pornographic video-sharing website

- Company type: Private
- Website type: Pornographic video sharing
- Available in: English, German, French, Spanish, Italian, Portuguese, Polish, Russian, Japanese, Dutch, Czech, Simplified Chinese
- Headquarters: Montreal, Canada
- Country of origin: Canada
- Area served: Worldwide
- Owner: Aylo
- Founder: Matt Keezer
- Industry: Sex
- Services: Pornography
- Parent: Ethical Capital Partners
- Website: www.pornhub.com
- Advertising: Yes
- Registration: Optional
- Launched: 25 May 2007; 19 years ago Montreal, Quebec, Canada
- Current status: Online

Pornhub is a Canadian-owned Internet pornography video-sharing website, one of several owned by Aylo, an adult entertainment conglomerate formerly known as MindGeek/Manwin/Mansef. As of June 2026, Pornhub is the 25th-most-visited website in the world and the most-visited pornography website.

The site allows visitors to view pornographic videos from various categories, including professional and amateur pornography, and to upload and share their own videos. Content can be flagged if it violates the website's terms of service. The site also hosts the Pornhub Awards annually.

In December 2020, following a New York Times exposé of non-consensual pornography and sex trafficking, payment processors Mastercard and Visa cut their services to Pornhub. Pornhub then removed all videos uploaded by unverified users, reducing the total content from 13 million to 4 million videos. A 2023 documentary, Money Shot: The Pornhub Story, covers the opposition to Pornhub and the views of some pornographic performers.

== History ==
Pornhub was launched on 25 May 2007 by web developer Matt Keezer as a website within the company Interhub. In March 2010, the company was purchased by Fabian Thylmann as part of the Manwin conglomerate (now known as Aylo). In 2013, Thylmann sold his stake in the company to Feras Antoon and David Tassillo, who served until 2022 as its CEO and COO, respectively.

In an effort to introduce quality curation to the site, the company launched a service called "Pornhub Select" in October 2013. Pornhub also launched a content curation website on 9 October 2013 called "PornIQ", which used an algorithm to create personalized video playlists for the viewer based on a number of factors, including their porn preferences, the time of day they are visiting the website, what part of the world they live in, and the amount of time the viewer has available. David Holmes of PandoDaily noted that Pornhub's data-intensive approach to playlists set it apart from previous attempts at user-generated playlists, and marked a new trend in the switch from content searching to passive curation among Web 2.0 websites.

By 2009, Aylo's three largest pornographic sites, RedTube, YouPorn, and PornHub, collectively had 100 million unique visitors.

In June 2015, Pornhub announced that it was going to make a pornographic film featuring real-life sex in space, named Sexplorations. The site hoped to launch the mission and shoot the movie in 2016, covering the pre- and post-production costs itself, but sought $3.4 million from IndieGogo crowdfunders. If funded, the film would have been slated for a 2016 release, following six months of training for the two performers and six-person crew.

On 1 February 2016, Pornhub launched an online casino powered by Betsoft, Endorphina, and 1x2gaming.

In October 2017, vice president Corey Price announced that Pornhub would use computer vision and artificial intelligence software to identify and tag videos on the website with information about the performers and sex acts. Price said the company planned to scan its entire library beginning early 2018.

On 17 April 2018, the site began accepting Verge cryptocurrency as a payment option.

In December 2020, following a column in The New York Times by Nicholas Kristof that was critical of the company, payment processors Mastercard and Visa cut their services to Pornhub. Pornhub then removed all videos by unverified users.

=== Non-consensual pornography ===
Incidents have been reported of Pornhub hosting child pornography, revenge porn, and rape pornography. The company has been criticized for slow or inadequate responses to these incidents.

Pornhub employs Vobile to search for uploads of banned videos to remove them from the site, and non-consensual content or personally identifiable information present on Pornhub can be reported to the company via an online form. Pornhub has been criticized for its response to non-consensual pornography and sex trafficking. Journalists at Vice commented that Pornhub profits from "content that's destroyed lives, and continues to do harm". Slate said that the move reflected a larger trend of Internet platforms using verification to classify sources.

In 2009, a 14-year-old girl was gang raped at knifepoint and the videos were uploaded to Pornhub. The girl stated that she emailed Pornhub repeatedly over a period of six months but received no reply. Eventually the videos were removed. Another case in October 2019 involved a man who faces charges of lewd and lascivious battery of a 15-year-old girl, videos of which were discovered on Pornhub, Modelhub, Periscope, and Snapchat that led to his arrest. In another incident of non-consensual pornography, the UK-based activist group #NotYourPorn was founded by the friend of a woman whose iCloud storage had been hacked, leading to the hacker posting sexually explicit photos and videos on Pornhub alongside her full name. Pornhub removed the video when reported, but clones of the video using her full name replicated faster than the videos were removed. The woman found "the fractured communication system at Pornhub has meant this has become an increasingly excruciating process". The founder of Not Your Porn reported that fifty women contacted her over a six-month period about non-consensual online pornography featuring them, thirty of whom reported that the videos were uploaded to Pornhub.

On 10 October 2019, the two owners of GirlsDoPorn along with two employees were arrested on three counts of sex trafficking by force, fraud, and coercion, after a civil lawsuit was filed in July. A week afterwards, the official verified GirlsDoPorn channel – the 20th-largest channel at the time – was removed from the site. The delayed response was criticized by journalists at Daily Dot and Motherboard. Additionally, the videos could still be found afterwards unofficially on Pornhub's website. In December 2020, MindGeek, Pornhub's parent company was sued in California for hosting non-consensual videos produced by GirlsDoPorn, which coerced women into appearing in their videos under false pretenses. In January 2021, a class action lawsuit making similar claims was launched in Montreal. The Canadian-proposed class action sought $600 million for anyone who had intimate photos and videos, some of which may have been taken when they were underage, shared on MindGeek's sites without their consent, since 2007. In June 2021, 34 women sued MindGeek in a California federal court, alleging that the company had exploited them and hosted and promoted videos that depicted rape, revenge porn, and child sexual abuse.

The Internet Watch Foundation (IWF) found 118 instances of child sexual abuse material on Pornhub between 2017 and 2019. Pornhub rapidly removed this content. An IWF spokesperson said that other social networks and communication tools posed more of an issue than Pornhub in regard to this type of content. In 2020, the National Center for Missing & Exploited Children reported that over 20 million reports of child sexual abuse material related to content on Facebook, accounting for 95% of total reports, and that Pornhub and other MindGeek sites were the subject of only 13,000 reports.

In response to abusive content on the site, an online petition calling for the shutdown of Pornhub gained over one million signatures throughout 2020. The petition was started by Laila Mickelwait, Director of Abolition at Exodus Cry, a Christian anti-trafficking and anti- sex-work non-profit. Her petition was addressed to the executives of MindGeek, the parent company of Pornhub. It noted numerous instances of non-consensual and child abuse material on the website, including a child trafficking victim who was made a "verified model" by the site. In response to the petition, Pornhub claimed they were committed to removing such material from the site.

In December 2020, Nicholas Kristof's opinion column in The New York Times described Pornhub as a company that "monetizes child rapes, revenge pornography, spy cam videos of women showering, racist and misogynist content, and footage of women being asphyxiated in plastic bags". In response to the column, Pornhub announced it would prevent video uploads from unverified users and would disable video downloads. Visa and Mastercard also announced they would review their financial ties to Pornhub. On 10 December 2020, Mastercard and Visa blocked use of their cards on Pornhub. Pornhub told the New York Times that these claims were "irresponsible and flagrantly untrue". Performer Siri Dahl expressed criticism that Visa and Mastercard's actions victimized pornographic performers, while Pornhub continued to make most of its money through banner ads. Kristof, in a follow-up 2025 column, cited internal documents that allegedly showed Pornhub employees joking about child sexual abuse material available and that moderators were aware of 706,000 videos that were flagged for unlawful content in 2020.

On 14 December 2020, Pornhub announced that all videos posted by unverified users had been removed from public access "pending verification and review". This reduced the number of videos on the website from 13 million to 4 million. In Brazil, according to Clayton Nunes, CEO of Brasileirinhas, the result of this action showed that the people who upload non-consensual pornography to Pornhub are the same people who upload pirated pornography. Following their ban on unverified user posting videos, Pornhub released a blog post where they compared those opposed to them to who "same forces that have spent 50 years demonizing Playboy, the National Endowment for the Arts, sex education, LGBTQ rights, women's rights, and even the American Library Association.

In April 2021, Vice reported that individuals tied to far-right and Christian fundamentalist groups, which claim to be anti-trafficking and anti-pornography activists, disseminated disinformation and made death threats towards Pornhub's staff and sex workers.

A 2023 documentary, Money Shot: The Pornhub Story, covered the opposition to Pornhub and the views of pornographic performers. It featured interviews with Kristof, a lawyer representing women suing MindGeek and a spokesperson for the anti-sex-trafficking group National Center on Sexual Exploitation.

In 2023, a tool developed by Meta Platforms—Take It Down—was released. Participating platforms—including Pornhub—agree to remove non-consensual images or videos that users flag with the tool. Other participants include OnlyFans, Facebook, Yubo, and Instagram. The program relies on users uploading hashes of images and cannot identify edited versions of the image.

In September 2025, Pornhub's operators were required to establish a program to prevent the distribution of nonconsensual material on its websites and pay a $5 million penalty to the state of Utah in order to settle their charges of doing little to block videos and photos featuring nonconsensual material.

=== Non-pornographic content ===
Pornhub users have often uploaded non-pornographic content to the site, including posts of Hollywood films (believing copyright holders would be less likely to look for uploads on Pornhub relative to mainstream video-sharing services such as YouTube), to monetize content deemed ineligible for monetization, or as memes and jokes. These videos often have double entendre titles resembling porn films. Examples include a pirated recording of the musical Hamilton listed as "Revolutionary Boys Get Dirty on American Politics"; a clip from the animated film Puss in Boots listed as "Hardcore Pussy Gets Wrecked"; highlight compilations of esports events tagged as a "gangbang"; and Ryan Creamer videos featuring comedic clips with sexual titles. In 2014 internet users uploaded highlight videos of the Brazil v Germany match on Pornhub under ironic titles such as "Young Brazilians get fucked by entire German soccer team." The site has since deleted the highlight videos on copyright grounds and issued a plea for users to cease uploading the footage in question, jokingly tweeting that their "public humiliation category is full."

In March 2020, Pornhub premiered Leilah Weinraub's documentary Shakedown, which chronicles a black lesbian strip club of the same name in Los Angeles. The film streamed on the service throughout March, before being released via Criterion Channel. Brand director Alex Klein stated that the film's premiere on Pornhub was part of "a larger general commitment Pornhub has to supporting the arts".

=== Copyright infringement claims ===
In 2010, Mansef Inc. and Interhub, the then-owners of Pornhub, were sued by the copyright holding company of the pornographic film production company Pink Visual, Ventura Content, for the copyright infringement of 95 videos on websites, including Pornhub, Keezmovies, Extremetube, and Tube8. According to Ventura Content, the 45 videos were streamed "tens of millions of times", and they claimed the piracy threatened the "entire adult entertainment industry". The suit was settled in October 2010, with terms that remain confidential. The parties agreed that the site operators would implement digital fingerprint filtering on their sites. Porn 2.0 sites such as these are seen as posing notable competition for paid pornographic websites and traditional magazine and DVD-based pornography.

In July 2021, Pornhub launched Classic Nudes, an interactive guide of classic art from major institutions, as a means to help museums recover from the financial toll of the pandemic. However, The Louvre, Uffizi Gallery, and Museo del Prado sued Pornhub for copyright infringement, claiming that the museums had never "granted authorizations for the operation or use of the art".

=== Malvertising ===
In 2013, researcher Conrad Longmore found that advertisements displayed by popular porn websites contained malware programs, which install harmful files on users' machines without their permission. Longmore told the BBC that of pornography websites, Pornhub and xHamster posed the greatest threat.

In 2017, security firm Proofpoint discovered malicious ads running on the site that had the potential to install override software on users' PCs. The ads had been promoted on the site for over a year without intervention from Pornhub.

== Products ==
Pornhub features virtual reality videos that allow 360° viewing for premium customers. It can be used with the PlayStation VR, though videos need to be downloaded from a computer and transferred via USB.

In 2015, Pornhub announced a planned wearable device called the "Wankband"—a wristband that stores kinetic energy during male masturbation and can then be used to charge devices. As of 2020, Pornhub's website says that the product is in development.

=== VPNHub ===
In May 2018, Pornhub launched a VPN service known as VPNHub, a free service that offered a paid ad-free version. VPNHub operated out of Cyprus and was built in partnership with US-based AppAtomic, using servers located in the US. According to TechRadar, VPNHub operated on the StackPath server network. VPNHub claimed a no-logging policy, but this has been questioned by a reviewer based on their actual practices surrounding advertiser data.

== Philanthropy ==
Pornhub has hosted events and campaigns to raise awareness of breast cancer. The first of these events took place in New York City on 24 April 2012, with the introduction of the "Boob Bus", which offered free breast exams for passers-by and taught self-examination techniques to use at home. Pornhub hosted a "Save the Boobs!" campaign in August 2012. For every 30 videos viewed in Pornhub's "big tit" or "small tit" category in the month of October, the website offered to donate a penny to the Susan G. Komen Foundation. However, the Susan G. Komen Foundation rejected the offer, stating that it was not a partner of Pornhub, would not accept its donations, and asked the company to stop using the foundation's name. Video views totaled 74,146,928, equaling approximately $24,716 worth of donations, which Pornhub subsequently tripled to $75,000. Donations were split among several charities, including the Eileen Stein Jacoby Fund and Cancer Sucks Inc.

For Arbour Day 2014, Pornhub launched a weeklong environmental campaign called "Pornhub Gives America Wood", which started on 25 April 2014 and ended on 2 May 2014.

== Pornhub Awards ==
The inaugural Pornhub Awards was held on 6 September 2018 at the Belasco Theater in Los Angeles. Kanye West was creative director. At the event, West debuted the music video for his song, "I Love It". The second annual show was held at the Orpheum Theatre in Los Angeles on 11 October 2019 and Bad Bunny headlined the event. The third show was held online on 15 December 2020 and hosted by Asa Akira. The fourth show did away with a ceremony and announced winners on 23 March 2022. The fifth show announced winners on 20 April 2023. The sixth show announced winners on 29 March 2024.

== Search trends ==
Under the heading of Pornhub Insights, the website regularly releases information extracted from its archive of searches: in what regions it is most used, female searches vis-à-vis male searches, the most popular search terms by year or area, variations in searches that parallel current events, and the like; in the first half of 2017, the top search term in the US was "hentai", or that gay male porn ranks as the second most viewed category on the website among female viewers with 37% of searchers in total for the genre being women. Annually since 2013, it releases a "Year In Review". Consequently, it has been called "the Kinsey Report of our time". According to research by data scientist Seth Stephens-Davidowitz, 25% of female searches for heterosexual porn on Pornhub involved keywords for painful, humiliating, or non-consensual sex. The Insights also found that the lesbian category has been consistently the most popular among female viewers since 2014 when gender statistics were first gathered (except in 2020 when the data was limited), and that women in general regardless of sexual orientation are more likely to search for lesbian-associated terms such as "scissoring" than men, who are typically the target audience of such content.

Pornhub has also reported on traffic trends and their relation to large events. Traffic was below usual levels during the solar eclipse of 21 August 2017. During the 2018 Hawaii false missile alert, web traffic to Pornhub in Hawaii fell by 77% (from typical Saturday figures) at 8:23 am, after the alert was sent, and increased 48% above typical levels at 9:01 am, after notification that the alert was erroneous. During the Eurovision 2024 finale Pornhub saw a traffic decline across many European countries.

The COVID-19 pandemic has led to increased searches for pornographic content on the Internet, with Pornhub being the most searched site. The study analyzed data from Google Trends and Pornhub Insights to understand the behavior of users during the pandemic. The results showed a peak of 24.4% more searches for pornographic audiovisual material in 2020 compared to 2019 across the same dates (1 March – 30 April) internationally. The increase in pornography searches seems to be conditioned by the marketing campaign promoted by Pornhub to offer free Premium content to encourage citizens to stay home, consuming pornography. The study also found a correlation between the percentage increase in searches for pornography made by men and women during the pandemic, as well as by age.

== Usage statistics ==
Pornhub reported that for the year 2016, the website was visited about 23 billion times, and viewers watched a cumulative total of 4,599 billion hours of pornographic videos online. In 2017 Pornhub reportedly registered 28.5 billion visits with an average of 81 million visits per day. "MILF" and "stepmom" were the two most searched terms worldwide. During the year 2019 Pornhub received 42 billion visits with an average of 115 million visits per day. The most searched for genres on Pornhub in 2019 are lesbian, hentai, fauxcest, milf, big ass, and creampie.

== Blocks and bans ==
Authorities and organizations throughout the world have implemented a variety of measures and strategies to restrict access to and use of Pornhub.

- 2011: European broadband provider TalkTalk (formerly Tiscali) received some criticism because its Internet filter failed to block Pornhub for over a week. This was due to the issue of child Internet safety.
- January 2013: The Huffington Post commented that CBS "refused to air a short commercial for adult-themed site Pornhub during the Super Bowl on Sunday ... . The 20-second spot, which features an older couple sitting on a park bench (that's really all that happens), includes no explicit content". It was rejected because the Federal Communications Commission could hold CBS liable for endorsing pornographic content, as it is illegal to air pornography on US television.
- September 2013: the website was blocked by the Great Firewall in China.
- 12 March 2014: Pornhub was blocked in Russia because one actress looked too young, leading some viewers to think she was a minor.
- September 2016: the site was blocked in Russia for "spreading harmful information to children" and reinstated in April 2017 after requiring users to specify their ages. The site demands Russian users authenticate themselves via the social network VK.
- January 2017: the Government of the Philippines blocked Internet users from accessing Pornhub and other pornography websites. The websites were blocked pursuant to Republic Act 9775 or the Anti-Child Pornography Law, which prohibits websites from hosting child pornography content.
- October 2018: the Uttarakhand High Court reinstated a ban on Pornhub in India but made it optional for ISPs to leave sites that are free of child pornography unblocked. In order to circumvent the ban, Pornhub established a mirror website at Pornhub.net.
- November 2020: the government of Thailand blocked Pornhub, among other pornography websites.
- 3 September 2022: Instagram banned the website's Instagram account indefinitely. It attracted 13 million followers and posted non-pornographic material. The ban followed lobbying by the National Center on Sexual Exploitation and others.
- 16 December 2022: Pornhub's YouTube account was taken down, only a few days after it was removed from TikTok.
- May 2023: Utah passed SB287, which required age verification and ID requirements for adult sites. Pornhub blocked user access from Utah, two days before the law came into effect. Instead of the full site, Utah users would see a message criticizing the legislation.
- February 2024: The Attorney General of the state of Texas sued Aylo/Pornhub for allegedly not obeying the state's legal age verification law. As of June 2025, Pornhub and other Aylo-owned websites have already blocked access in Texas, due to the adoption of an age verification law which usually mandates age verification through the use of an identity document. In states where Pornhub is blocked, which also include currently and in the future: Alabama, Arkansas, Louisiana, Mississippi, Montana, North Carolina, Utah, Virginia, Arizona, Florida, Nebraska, Indiana, South Carolina, Tennessee, Georgia, Kansas, Idaho, Wyoming, South Dakota, North Dakota, Kentucky, and Oklahoma; a message is displayed featuring pornstar Cherie DeVille criticizing such laws.
- June 2025: After France passed a law that required pornographic websites to use IDs or credit cards to prevent minors from using the website, Pornhub blacked out in France. In place of the website there is a picture of Liberty Leading the People, as well as a text protesting the law, saying "Your government suggests checking your age every time you visit our site – that's crazy, right?"
- July 2025: In the United Kingdom, the Online Safety Act 2023 requires the use of mandatory age verification for Pornhub and other pornographic websites. Pornhub has said it will comply with the regulation.
- July 2026: Russia has blocked Pornhub.

== In popular culture ==
Pornhub made a prominent appearance in many scenes of the 2013 American romantic comedy film Don Jon. Pornhub Vice President Cory Price explained that one of the film's producers approached the company in March 2012, seeking permission to use the Pornhub brand. Price reviewed the movie's script and granted them permission, going as far as helping them find clips to use in the movie from Pornhub's content partners (e.g. Brazzers, Mofos, Digital Playground, and Twistys). Joseph Gordon-Levitt, who wrote, directed, and starred in the film, edited the clips together into rapid-fire montages, also featured prominently in the film.

=== Pornhub Community intro trend ===
In recent years, a three-second drum and bass jingle which plays at the start of Pornhub Community (amateur) videos has become a cultural phenomenon, with Pornhub executives acknowledging its reach. In 2020, a video of a student playing the jingle with his band at a talent show went viral. In 2021, a TikTok trend went viral, where one plays the Pornhub community intro and gauges reactions to catch unexpected people who visit the website. According to some feminist activists, these reactions reflect the over-consumption of pornography across all social categories. The community jingle is also played by viewers during Twitch streams to elicit similar reactions.

== Legacy ==
The original investors Ouissam Youssef and Steph Manos, who sold their ownership in 2010, founded Valnet in 2012. In 2022, Youssef stated he exited the business because he started a family and his "moral compass changed".

== See also ==
- Internet pornography
- List of most-visited websites
- List of online video platforms
- Porn 2.0
