= FanCentro =

Social network for adult content

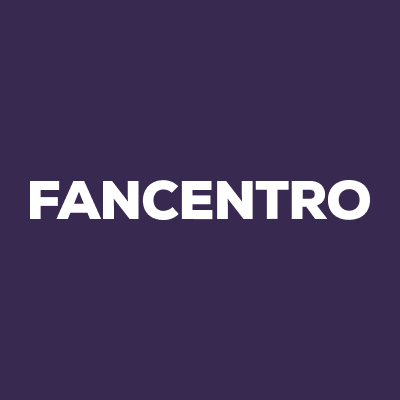
- Website type: Premium social network
- Available in: English, German, Spanish, Russian
- Headquarters: Matawan, New Jersey, United States
- Country of origin: United States
- Area served: Worldwide
- Founders: Stan Fiskin; Alan Hall
- CEO: Alan Hall
- Services: Social Media monetization, Direct Messaging, Clip store, Subscriptions, Feed
- Website: fancentro.com
- Launched: February 8, 2017; 9 years ago
- Current status: Active

FanCentro is a subscription-based website platform created in 2017 that allows adult film performers and other influencers to sell access to their private social media accounts. Due to deplatforming and shadow banning of sex-related content on social media sites, the platform began allowing fans to subscribe to content feeds directly on the site. The rise of premium social networks such as FanCentro, OnlyFans and JustForFans is a significant shift in the structure of the porn industry, as performers can own and continue to profit from their work and better control working conditions.

FanCentro has been a vocal defender of the rights of sex workers.

== History ==
The FanCentro platform was developed by entrepreneurs Stan Fiskin and Alan Hall of AdultCentro following the success of their ModelCentro tool, which allowed individual adult performers to create their own subscription websites. Unlike earlier platforms, which relied on social media or external visitors, FanCentro provided content creators with the ability to build their audience from within the platform's existing audience.

=== House Of FanCentro ===
In May 2019, FanCentro launched House Of FanCentro, a free one-week workshop in Miami, connecting models on its platform with professional photographers, with the goal of improving their content. Another House of FanCentro event was held in Los Angeles later that year, and in Medellin, Colombia in 2020. Further events were cancelled following the outbreak of the coronavirus.

=== Growth During COVID-19 ===
During the 2020 coronavirus pandemic and shutdown, paid social networks experienced significant growth after mainstream adult production was halted. FanCentro said it saw a rise of 65% in new daily sign-ups in the first weeks of the shutdown. By May 2020, the site boasted over 190,000 models (up from 15,000 in September 2019 and 6,000 in July 2018) with 19,000 signing up in the preceding two months alone.

FanCentro encouraged influencers on its platform to help encourage people to stay home and to fight misinformation about the COVID-19 virus.

=== Centro University ===
In September 2020, FanCentro launched Centro University (stylized as "Centro U" or "CentroU"), an online business school for adult influencers. The program had been in development for two years but was prioritized after large numbers of new people began using the platform and others like it to sell adult content during the 2020 production holds in the adult industry. Online classes in marketing and promotion, film and video production, privacy and censorship, health and safety and other subjects are taught by sex workers and available for free for anyone using the platform.

== Features ==
Like other premium social networking platforms, FanCentro allows content creators (or "influencers") to interact with and directly sell to fans.

- Messaging. Influencers can send direct messages and media to individuals or groups, which can free or paid, provided those individuals follow or have already interacted with the influencer. Any influencer if they follow, attempt to join, tip, or subscribe to that influencer. Fans can use the messaging feature to directly tip influencers.
- FanCentro Feed. Influencers can post text, audio, photo, and video content to a social media feed which may be either public or paid. Fans who want access to paid or locked posts must subscribe for full access. Posts can be scheduled with preset content to post at a later date.
- Tips. Fans may tip influencers directly using the influencer's personal tip link or through the messaging feature.
- Clips. Clips allows influencers to sell video clips directly on their page to fans who may not have a paid subscription.
- Social Networks subscriptions. Influencers can establish private social network accounts which fans can pay to access. Subscriptions may be monthly, yearly, or lifetime.
- Languages FanCentro platform's main language is English. However, the platform and tools are available in Spanish, German and Russian.

== Promotions ==
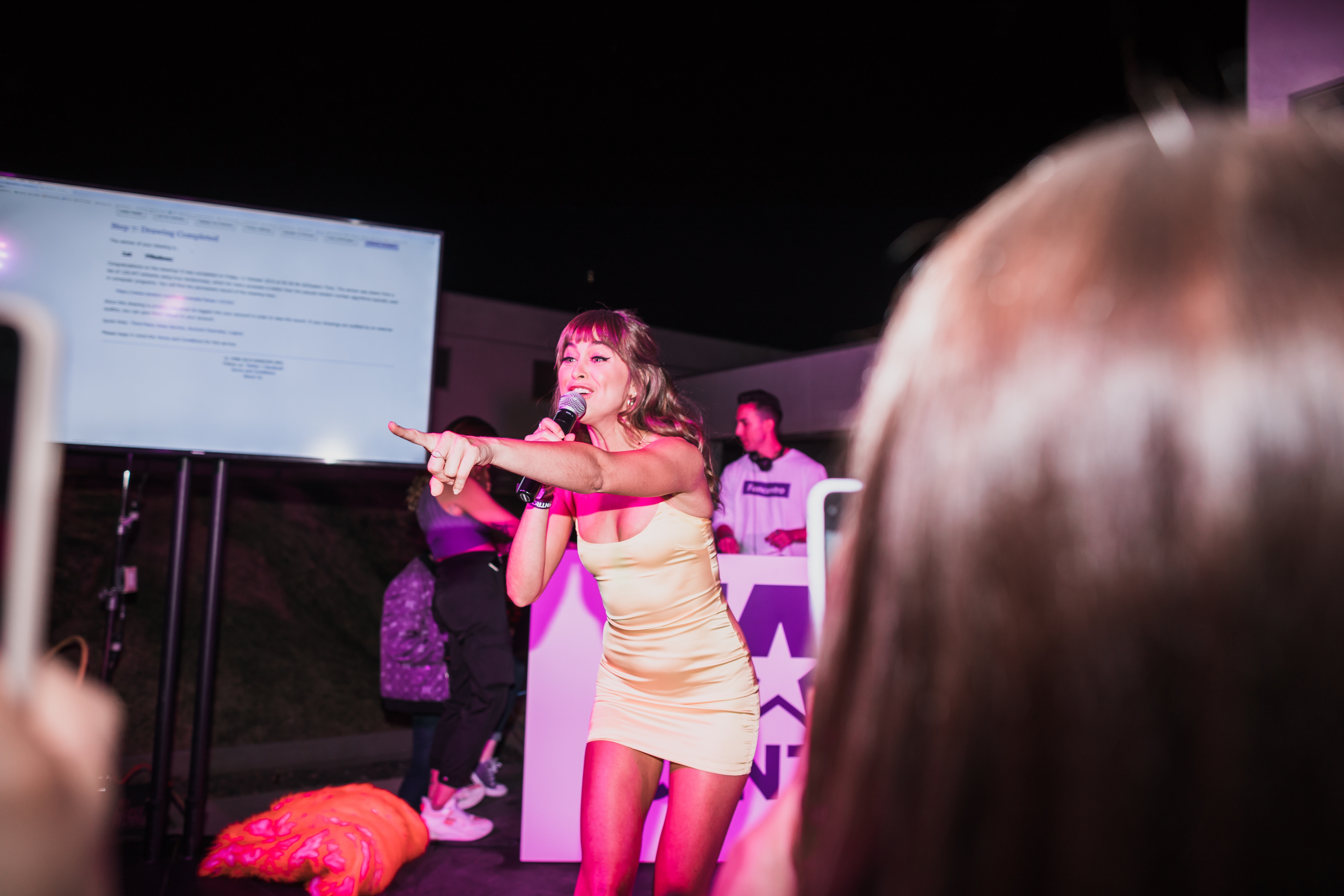
Riley Reid announces the winner

=== Lamborghini Giveaway ===
In June 2019, FanCentro sponsored a Lamborghini Urus in the Gumball 3000 charity race, from Mykonos to Ibiza. The Lamborghini was covered in a colored tape matching the style and colors of FanCentro brand, as part of a collaboration with Miami's Black Tape Project.

FanCentro simultaneously announced a promotional giveaway for the Lamborghini to a model on its platform. Each $69 earned by a model on the platform would result in one raffle ticket. On October 12, FanCentro conducted a raffle hosted by porn star Riley Reid in Los Angeles. Porn star Lela Star won the car.
