= Pink TV (France) =

- Country: France
- Broadcast area: France
- Headquarters: Paris, France

Programming
- Language: French
- Picture format: 576i (16:9 SDTV); 1080i (HDTV)

History
- Launched: 25 October 2004; 21 years ago
- Founder: Pascal Houzelot

Links
- Website: www.pinktv.fr

Pink TV is Europe's second gay satellite channel (after Italy's GAY.tv), started in France on 25 October 2004, on a subscription basis, mostly funded by TF1 and Canal Plus terrestrial channels in France. It is now possible to access Pink TV via satellite, cable and DSL providers. Highlights include Queer as Folk, as well as talkshows (including So Graham Norton). There is an X-rated film four times a week after midnight, and the channel broadcasts 24 hours per day, including productions from porn studios including French Twinks. Pink X launched in 2012 a pornographic reward, the PinkX Gay Video Awards.

== History ==
On 25 October 2004, Pink TV was born on cable and satellite in the form of a pay-TV channel.

On 12 March 2007, when the channel's accounts were bad, the Conseil supérieur de l'audiovisuel accepted the Pink TV project, which consisted of splitting the antenna into two: the day, the usual programs (cultural, entertainment, information expressing homosexual culture and lifestyles) and from midnight onwards, a service that broadcasts pornographic programs. Since 4 September 2007, Pink TV has been broadcasting free-to-air two hours a day from 10 pm to midnight. Its grid is composed only of rebroadcasts. Then, starting at midnight, it transmits encrypted until 5 am with a paying offer consisting only of X-rated movies called Pink X.

As of October 2008, the channel's accounts have improved, it released new programs (films, documentaries, shows) alongside the rebroadcasts.

But, in 2012, fewer and fewer operators are broadcasting Pink TV in clear two hours a day. This time slot is no longer available free at Free since 2009 nor on the Bbox of Bouygues Telecom since 2012.

Also, since July 2013, Pink TV has stopped broadcasting real programs between 10 pm and midnight. Instead, it offered short-lived scenes without words played by two different couples.

At the moment, no program is offered from 22:00 to 00:00. Pink X programs start at 00:00. Launched as a chain of homosexual culture, but not having found its audience, it now only broadcasts pornographic films.

== Shareholders ==
- M. Pascal Houzelot: 29.92%
- Canal+: 17.52%
- Groupe TF1: 11.44%
- Société M6 Thématique: 9.15%
- Société Connection: 9.15%
- Société Siges: 8.79%
- Société Hélios (Groupe Lagardère): 8.73%
- Société Financière Pinault: 1.93%
- M. Pierre Bergé: 1.93%
- Société Sophia Asset Management Ltd: 0.48%
- M. Henri Biard: 0.48%
- Société Tilder: 0.48%

== Notable programming ==
(presenters in parentheses)

- L’Agenda clubbing (Anthony Aréal)
- Bibliothèque Pink (Pascal Sevran)
- Bonheur, bonheur, bonheur (Éric Guého)
- Ça s’est passé comme ça (Frédéric Mitterrand)
- Cours chez Pink (Mathieu Lecerf)
- Le Débat (Laurent Drezner, Thomas Joubert, Alex Taylor)
- Face à Pink (Claire Chazal, Frédéric Mitterrand)
- Hétéro mais pas trop! (Laurent Artufel)
- Le je/nous de Claire (Claire Chazal)
- Les Pieds dans le plat mais pas trop! (Laurent Artufel, Éric Guého)
- Le Set (Christophe Beaugrand, Marie Labory, Raphaël Pathé)
- Pink Pong (Marie Labory)
- Zap’Pink (Laurent Artufel, Christophe Renaud)

== PinkX Gay Video Awards ==
The PinkX Gay Video Awards are annual gay pornographic awards in various categories. The Awards were launched by Pink TV in 2012 (later renamed Pink X) based on pornographic films included on the channel's programming.

=== Best New Cummer ===
Year	Name	Photo	Nationality	For	Nominations
2012	Dario Beck		(United States)	Criminal Intent (TitanMen)	Brandon Wilde in Take a load off (Rascal); Fabian Esteban in Gay House (Berry Prod); Kameron Frost in Le Clash (Crunchboy); Kennedy Carter in Splash of the Tight' Uns (UK Naked Men)
2013	Matt Kennedy		(France)	Dépucelages d'hétéros 3 (HPG)	Angel Rock in Bad Ass Bottoms (Jet Set Men); Jake Bass in Edge of Glory (CockyBoys); Mason Star in Edge of Glory (Cocky Boys)
2014	Josh Long		(United States)	Young and Furry (Dominic Ford)	Lyle Boyce in Cottage Boy (Eurocreme); Joey Cooper in The Boy Who Cried – DILF (All Words); Julien in 8 en partouze (GFK)
2015	Andrea Suarez		(United Kingdom)	Sneaker Sex Fuckers	Camille Kenzo; Mickey Taylor; Nathan Hope; Théo Ford
2016	Adam Ramzi			Workout	Frank Valencia dans Bear Essentials; Nick North dans Hard Labour; Brute Club dans Slammed; Logan Moore dans Stuffed; Juliano dans Juliano et ses potes
2017	Carter Dane			Let Them Eat Cake	Jason Maddox in Summer of Sweat; Ludwig in Bizutages de culs Lucas Phelps in The Hook-Up Hostel; Jay Alexander in How to Get Away with Murder; Abel Lacourt in L'Irrésistible Abel Lacourt
2018	Aarin Asker			Rubbergeddon	William Lefort; Kimi Monroe; LMDK in Hey taxi prends-moi Alex Chu in The Deuce; Leo-Rex Bunny

=== Best Duo ===
Year	Name	Photo	Nationality	For	Nominations
2012	Brent Everett and Brandon Wilde		(United Kingdom)	Take A Load Off	
2013	Jake Bass and Mason Star		(United States)	Edge of Glory (CockyBoys)	
2014	Billy Rubens and Dirk Caber		(United Kingdom)	Daddy's Boy (DadsFuckingLads)	David Peter / Michael Laurent in Baise-moi ! (Berry Prod HD); Brady Jensen and Ty Roderick in Stalker (NakedSword); Paulo Massa and Rudy Light in Lascars en force 3 (Citebeur); Kameron Frost and Matt Kennedy in Indic (Menoboy); Matteo Valentine and Ale Tedesco in Hairy Butt Bangers (Butch Dixon)
2015	Trelino and Christian Wilde		(United States)	Addict	Alex Marte and Kris Irons; Colby Keller and Seth Santoro; Gabriel Clark and Jaxon Radoc; Kai Alexander and Dolan Wolf; Tikehau and Mathieu Ferhati
2016	Kayden Gray and Danny Montero			Slammed	Rafael Alencar and Marcus Isaacs in The Pack; Damien Crosse and Logan Vaughn in Baiseurs d'exception Camille Kenzo and Théo Ford in Camille Kenzo aux USA; Issac Jones and Bruno Knight in Circus of Sex; Mack Manus and Kevin Ass in Lifeguard
2017	Sean Zevran and Armond Rizzo			Hard Medecine	Tyler Jenkins and Cody Rivers in Bound: Slaves for Their Cocks; Tiziano / Joe Delight in Les Bonhommes 3 Doryann Marguet / Joaquim B (Fabien Crunchboy) in Mate-moi ça me fait jouir Boomer Banks / Dillon Rossi in Boomer Has a Big Fat Dick; Carter Dane / Colby Keller in Let Them Eat Cake
2018	Allen King and Boomer Banks			Hard Wood	

=== Best Active ===
Year	Name	Photo	Nationality	For	Nominations
2012	Brent Everett		(Canada)		
2013	Paddy O'Brian		(United Kingdom)		
2014	Paddy O'Brian		(United Kingdom)	Straight as They Cum (UKNakedMen)	Ryan the caillera in Ryan, The caillera (Citebeur); Ken Ten in Studio of Sin (UKNakedMen); Antonio Garcia in Daddy’s Boy (DadsFuckingLads); Christian Wilde in Wilde Road (NakedSword); Jake Bass in King of Hearts (Cockyboys)
2015	Colby Keller		(United States)	Caliente!	Jimmy Johnson; Mathieu Ferhati; Nathan Hope; Rafael Alencar
2016	Gabriel Clark			The Amazing Cocky Boys	Enzo Rimenez in Légendes du X Delta Kobra in Topher! Rocco Steele in Stuffed; Kayden Gray in Daddy's Orgy; Nathan Hope in Be My Fuck Toy
2017	Paolo Bravo			Bravo Boys Band	Adam Ramzi in Fame Game; Tex Davidson in Buff & Scruff; Killian James in Sergeant Daddy; Dalton Briggs in Berkeley; Dato Foland in Dato Has A Big Fat Dick
2018	Doryann Marguet			Jeunes étudiants délurés	Kayden Gray in Rubbergeddon; Paolo Bravo in BravoFucker; Justin Brody; Enzo Lemercier in Petits Jeux entre minets Benjamin Blue in Cory Has a Big Fat Cock

=== Best Passive ===
Year	Name	Photo	Nationality	For	Nominations
2012	Léo Hélios		(France)		
2013	Léo Helios		(France)		
2014	Jeff Stronger		(United States)	Rigid (Titan Men)	Jessie Colter in Men Of The World : Miami (Men of the world); Adrian Toledo in Studio of Sin (UKNakedMen); Marcus Mojo in The Harder, The Better (NextDoor Studios); Jake Bolton in Hairy Butt Bangers (Butch Dixon); Stany Falcone in Fast Friends (Titan Men)
2015	Duncan Black		(United States)	Grosses bites	Camille Kenzo; Marc Humper; Mike DeMarko; Trelino
2016	JP Dubois			Hooded	Billy Santoro in My Doctor Rocks; Camille Kenzo in Camille Kenzo aux USA; Ricky Roman in The Amazing Cocky Boys; Mickey Taylor in XXL Hammered; Yo in Yo abusé et enchanté
2017	Armond Rizzo			Hard Medecine	Aitor Bravo in Bites chaudes à Barcelone; Cory Prince in Sergeant Daddy; Angel Cruz in A Man & His Boy; Jayden Middleton in Pumped; Teddy Torres in Butt Breaker
2018	Carter Dane			Just Love: A Porn Star Guide to Sexual Freedom	Sam Barclay; Chris Harder; François Sagat in Paris Perfect; Colton Grey; Tegan Zayne

=== Best Group ===
Year	Name	Photo	Nationality	For	Nominations
2012	Ashley Ryder, Viktor, Korben David			London Massive 2 (UK Naked Men)	
2013	Aurélien Angel, Gaëtan, Juan Perez		(France)	Internat pour Garçons (Berry Prod HD)	
2014	Ashley Ryder, J.P. Dubois, Leo Cage		(United Kingdom)	The London Massive part 3 (UK Naked Men)	Anthony Cruz, Jeremy F., Dylan Donovan pour Jeune et baisable (Berry Prod HD); Ashley Ryder, J.P. Dubois, Leo Cage dans The London Massive part 3 (UKNakedMen); Kyle Quinn, David Anthony, Race Cooper dans Special Reserve (Titan Men); Spencer Reed, Hunter Vance, Andrew Blue, Bryce Star, Chris Tyler, Cole Brooks, Evan Mercy, Randy Star dans To Fuck a Predator Gang Bang (Jet Set); Tim Loux, Dylan, Fabien Dolko dans Indic (Menoboy)
2015	Yo, Maltos, le Marseillais		(France)	Le Bad Boy de Marseille (Citébeur)	Denix, Gino, Jean Kader, Léon, Lets Boy in Weekend très chaud à Paris ! Dolan Wolf, Bruno Fox, Rich Kelly in Check Mate; Leo Forte, Drew Sebastian, Max Cameron in Addict; Tommy Defendi, Duncan Black, Darius Ferdynand in Massive New York Cocks
2016	Sebastian Kross, Derek Atlas, David Benjamin, Dario Beck			Clusterfuck! 1	Brian Jovovich, Connor Maguire, Marcel Gassion, Rick Lautner & Tim Campbell in Dirty Rascals; Guillaume Wayne, Thomas, Théo Ford, Jérôme in Brochettes de minets pour mâles affamés Bruno Bernal, Craig Daniel, Marco DuVaul, Drew Kingston, Mickey Taylor in Ruined; Danny Montero, Matthew Anders, Kayden Gray, Ross Drake, Lyle Boyce, Cory Prince in Daddy's Orgy; Dan Broughton, Mickey Taylor, Guillaume Wayne in XXL Hammered
2017	Colby Keller, Duncan Black, Justin Matthews			Kiss Hug Fuck Love	Kamel, Steve and Lexitoy in Sextapes From France; Zac Hunter, Camille Kenzo, Skyler Dallon, Xavier Sibley, Sacha West in France-Canada / 4 points par trou Dylan Thorne, Reece Bentley, Timmy Treasure in Bound : Slaves For Their Cocks; All the cast of Prends-moi en stop Brandon Wilde, Brian Bonds, Trenton Ducati in Secret & Lies
2018	Brent Corrigan, Dominic Pacifico and Dorian Ferro			Ultra Fan	

=== Best Amateur Film ===
Year	Title	Distributor	Nominations
2012	Chaudes vacances avec Jordan Fox	(Crunchboy)	
2013	Macho Fucker XXL	Crunchboy	
2014	Devoirs de vacances by Christo Ball	GayFrenchKiss	Scottxxx One (Scottxxx) by Scott Sniffs Socks; Lascars en cave (Crunchboy) by Jess Royan; TED TN acteur et scénariste (GFK) by Christo Ball; Les plans perso de Fred Sneaker (Sketboy) by Fred Sneaker
2015	Week-end très chaud à Paris	GayFrenchKiss	7 trous à jus (HPG); Anthony Cruz : ses plans directs TTBM (AirmaxSex); Pornstars (Crunch Boy); Soirée Pizza (le petit gay production)
2016	À deux dans mon cul	HPG	Gros Calibres pour minets (Arimaxsex); Les vices de Waikix (Crunch Boy); Couilles à vider (Crunch Boy); Ils se font défoncer (Crunch Boy); Men of Montréal vol 1 (Men of Montréal)
2017	Objectif Cul !	Christo Ball	Kiffeurs Underground 2 (Fred Sneaker); Casting à cruncher (Jess Royan); Passifs pour gros calibres (Jess Royan); Men of Montreal 8 (Marko Lebeau)
2018	Hey taxi prends-moi	HPG	Viens kiffer les mecs de téci (Citébeur); Bravo Boys Band 2 (BravoFucker); Des hétéros qui baisent des mecs (Crunch Boy); Un porno presque parfait (Crunch Boy); Jouissances et Cagoules (Gayfrenchkiss)

=== Best Ethnic Film ===
(Category suspended in 2018)

Year	Title	Distributor	Nominations
2012	Souann et ses potes	Citébeur	
2013	Med in France	Citébeur	
2014	Lascars en force 2	Citébeur	Le jus des lascars (HPG) de HPG; Black Dream White Cream (All Worlds) by Chi Chi Larue; Les Nikeurs de Cooper (Citebeur) by Stéphane
2015	Bites de Black pour culs blancs	Dominic Ford	Cuban XL Cocks; Les Nikeurs by Marc Humper (Citébeur); Serial Sneaker #6 (Sketboy.com); Walid le zobeur (Citébeur)
2016	Malik et ses potes	Citébeur	Phat Dick Fitness (Next Door Ebonyd); Juliano et ses potes (Citébeur); Matos de Blackos 7 (Univers Black); Quartier chaud 4 (Citébeur); Quartier chaud 5 (Citébeur)
2017	Bravo Boys Band	Paolo Bravo	How to get away with murder (Dominic Ford); Les Bonhommes 3 (Stéphane); Viens kiffer les mecs de téci # 02 (Stéphane); Viens kiffer les mecs de téci #03 (Stéphane)

=== Best Actor ===
Year	Name	Photo	Nationality	For	Nominations
2012	Stany Falcone		(Belgium)	Stany Falcone	Brent Everett in Some Things Cum Up; Spencer Reed in Spencer Reed; Jessy Dog in Incarcération; Dillon Buck in Getting Ahead in Business; John Despe in Incarcération
2013	Topher DiMaggio		(United States)		
2014	Christian Wilde		(United States)	Wilde Road (NakedSword)	François Sagat in Incubus 2 (Titan Men); Brady Jensen in Stalker (NakedSword); Kameron Frost in Indic (Menoboy); Kareem in Indic (Menoboy); Trenton Ducati in Grindhouse (NakedSword)
2015	Mike De Marko		(United States)	Sentenced & Punished	Darius Ferdynand; Dillon Rossi; Fabio; Jacob Daniels
2016	Brent Corrigan		(United States)	Vegas Hustle	Rocco Steele in Daddy Issues; Jordan Fox in Les Patients du Dr Jordan Fox; Theo Ford in I, Spy; Matt Kennedy in Agents X Guillermo Cruz in Agents X
2017	Doryann Marguet		(France)	Plaisir charnel	Johannes Lars in PizzaBoy; Matthew Bosch in Cauke for President; Trenton Ducati in Secret & Lies; Colton Grey in Cruising For Ass; Ryan Rose in Scared Stiff
2018	Paul Delay		(France)	Hotthell PornHorror Movie	Brent Corrigan; Ludwig in Le Goût salé de tes lèvres sucrées Jason Vario; Mark Long; Mickey Taylor

=== Best Director ===
Year	Name	Photo	Nationality	For	Nominations
2012	Stéphane Berry		(France)	Gay House	
2013	François Sagat and Brian Mills		(France) (United States)	Incubus	
2014	Ludovic Peltier		(France)	Indic	Joe Gage in Special Reserve (Titan Men); Jonno in Dominant Daddies (Butch Dixon); Ashley Ryder and Blacky Mendez in Snatched (Bulldog); Mr. Pam in Grindhouse (NakedSword)
2015	Andy O'Neill		(United States)	Daddy Knows Best	Chi Chi LaRue in Sentenced & Punished; Chris Steele in America's next hot bottom Jack Jones in The Weekend; Jonno in Big Dick French Adventures; Mr Paml in Addict; Sam Barclay & JP Dubois in Toy Stories
2016	Antoine Lebel et Jérôme Bondurand			Minets au camping French Twinks	Martial Amaury in Amours suprêmes d'or et de lumière 2 Mr. Pam in Vegas Hustle; Dominic Ford in Baiseurs d'exception Lucas Kazan in The Men I Wanted 2 JP Dubois and Sam Barclay in Hooded
2017	Mr. Pam			Fame Game NakedSword	Sam Barclay and JP Dubois in Grappld; Jasun Mark in Cauke For President; Blacky Mendez in The Hook-Up Hostel; Ettore Tosi in The Spanish Conexxxion; Chi Chi LaRue in Scared Stiff
2018	Jake Jaxson			The Stillest Hour CockyBoys	Ettore Tosi; Ridley Dovarez; Antoine Lebel; Mr. Pam

=== Best Foreign Film ===
Year	Title	Distributor	Nominations
2012	Slick Dogs	Titan Media	
2013	Incubus by François Sagat and Brian Mills	Titan Media	
2014	Stalker by Mr. Pam	Naked Sword	London Spunked (All Worlds) by Chi Chi LaRue; The Ultimate Top (Jet Set) by Chris Steele; Cottage Boy (Eurocreme) by Blacky Mendez; Studio of Sin (UK Naked Men) by Jonno; Daddy’s Boy (DadsFuckingLads) by Andy O’Neill
2015	Sentenced & Punished by Chi Chi LaRue	Rascal Video	Addict (Mr. Pam, Naked Sword); Broken (Asley Rider, Bulldog); Daddy Knows Best (Andy O'Neill, Dads Fucks Lads); Frat House Cream (Mr. Pam, Naked Sword); Jake Bass and ses amants (Jake Jaxson, CockyBoys)
2016	The Amazing Cocky Boys	CockyBoys	Dirty Rascals (Naked Sword); Clusterfuck! 1 (Raging Stallion); Baiseurs d'exception (Dominic Ford); Twinks on Top (Phoenixxx); Hooded (UK Hot Jocks)
2017	Don't Make Him Beg de Jonno	UKNakedMen	A Man & His Boy by Jake Jaxson; Berkeley by mr. Pam; Abducted by Blacky Mendez; Tahoe: Cozy Up by Tony DiMarco; Spanish Milk by JP Dubois & Sam Barclay
2018	Paris Perfect de Mr Parker	NakedSword	Ultra Fan; Cauke for Free; The Stillest Hour; Silverlake; Rubbergeddon

=== Best French Film ===
Year	Title	Distributor	Nominations
2012	Incarcération by Ludovic Peltier	Menoboy	Gay House by Stéphane Berry; Sexual Network 1 by Mr Burns; Le Gang des cagoules by SP; Open Bar by Ludovic Peltier
2013	Le Riad	Menoboy	
2014	Indic by Ludovic Peltier	Menoboy	Une heure de colle (Menoboy) by Ludovic Peltier; Baise-moi ! (Berry Prod HD) by Stéphane Berry; Le garçon du lac (Berry Prod HD) by Stéphane Berry; Les Nikeurs de Cooper (Citebeur) by Stéphane
2015	Tout le monde baise Camille by Antoine Lebel and Jérôme Bondurand	French Twinks	De Passage (Stephane Berry, Mecs de France); Les Grimpeurs (Ludovic Peltier, Menoboy); Skets Shop Boys (Fred Sneaker, Skerboy.com); Suckers (Ridley Dovarez, RD)
2016	Agents X	Ridley Dovarez	Amours suprêmes d'or et de lumière 2 (Comme des anges); Minets au camping (French Twinks); Plaisirs cachés d'Orient (Menoboy); Nathan Hope sexy et vicieux (Citébeur); Lifeghaurd (Ridley Dovarez)
2017	Fuckers Society	Ridley Dovarez	Baise en plein air d'Antoine Lebel; Baise avec les stars by Antoine Lebel; Les Inconscients by Ludovic Peltier; Coup de poker by Stéphane Berry; Prends-moi en stop by HPG
2018	Le Goût salé de tes lèvres sucrées	Ridley Dovarez	Derrière la porte (Menoboy); Passions estivales (French Twinks); HotHell Porn Horror Movie (French Twinks); Hey Taxi Prends-moi (HPG); Minets sportifs (French Twinks)
