= Angel Rivera =

American pornographic actor (born 1998)

- Born: Ricardo Salinas; February 18, 1997 (age 29); Austin, Texas
- Occupation: Pornographic film actor
- Years active: 2018–present
- Height: 5 ft 7 in (170 cm)

Ricardo Salinas, known professionally as Angel Rivera (born February 18, 1997) is a Mexican-American pornographic actor, known for his work in the gay adult film industry. Initially gaining attention for his films for Helix Studios, he has subsequently worked with other studios including CockyBoys, Falcon Studios, Guys in Sweatpants, HotHouse Studios, Naked Sword, and Men.com. Rivera is a versatile performer, and is considered one of the most recognisable and popular Latin twunk performers in the industry. He has earned multiple awards and nominations for his work, notably being named Performer of the Year at the 2020 Str8Up Gay Porn Awards, and winning the GayVN Award for Best Actor in 2021. He was also one of the most-searched performers on Pornhub Gay in 2024.

== Early life ==
Rivera was born and raised in a border town four hours south of Austin, Texas. He described that his upbringing was challenging as told AVN, "you have to have thick skin to get along, really. And if someone’s really sensitive or bullied, they’re going to be picked on double. So what I learned growing up in a border town was one, I’ve got to learn Spanish, because I’m a Mexican that doesn’t know Spanish in a Spanish town; and two, I need to let people stop fucking with me". He also cited living in a small border town as a reason why he wasn't able to explore his sexuality until later in his teens, but expressed that "I knew deep down I was bisexual. I just never really explored it", and that he exclusively dated women for several years, and had a difficult time coming out to his family as an only child, and has spoken openly about struggling with depression during this time. He stated that dating his first boyfriend in college at Texas State University helped him to "find [himself]".

== Career ==
Rivera made his porn debut in 2018 in a film for Helix Studios, and signed an exclusive contract with them when he was 20 years old after shooting his first few scenes. He was already a fan of the studio and was paying for a subscription when he applied to be a model, initially believing that nothing would come from his application until he received a message a few days after submitting it. Rivera expressed that he hopes his work helps to inspire others, stating, "if more models were open about their experiences growing up and all the bad stuff that’s happened. Kids need to grow up not being so afraid to hit on somebody, or not being afraid to walk up and ask a girl for her number, because I was that kid." He announced his departure from Helix on January 28, 2019, stating that he wanted to focus on creating content for his OnlyFans, but clarified that he had no intention to quit performing and wanted to take his career in a new direction.

In 2020, Rivera was introduced as a Fleshjack Boy. The same year, he signed a contract to become an exclusive model for CockyBoys. Of this decision, Rivera stated, "I am choosing to go exclusive with CockyBoys because I feel like we can build each other up and both benefit from this deal. Things fall into place when they do and with me now being based in New York the timing feels right. I have a great amount of professional and personal chemistry with the team, and I know there are things I can learn to make my content better and also better elevate my business sense. There’s mutual respect and value here and I feel like we will continue to put together works of art demonstrating sexual freedom." His first scene for the studio, a COVID-19 pandemic influenced film with Sean Ford called "6 Feet Apart", premiered on August 21, 2020.

Rivera joined the cast of OUTtv's reality television series X-Rated: NYC for the show's third season, which aired across six episodes from September to October 2024. The series followed the personal and professional lives of gay porn stars living in New York City and also starred Rivera's ex-boyfriend and frequent collaborator Joey Mills. Rivera had appeared in six episodes over the previous two seasons in a guest role.

== Personal life ==
Rivera identifies as pansexual. He is open about his previous struggles with mental health and addiction. He was previously in a relationship with fellow adult performer Joey Mills.

== Filmography ==
Year	Title	Notes
2022-2024	X-Rated: NYC	Main role (season three); Recurring role (season two); Guest role (season one)

=== Music videos ===
Year	Title	Artist(s)	Ref.
2018	"Daddy D"	Willam Belli	

== Awards and nominations ==
=== GayVN Awards ===
The GayVN Awards are presented annually to honor word in the gay adult film industry. The awards are sponsored by AVN magazine and are a spinoff of the AVN Awards, which are considered the "Oscars of porn". Rivera has won three awards from eleven nominations.

List of awards and nominations received by Angel Rivera
Year	Category	Nominated work	Studio	Result	Ref.
2019	Best Newcomer	Himself	—N/a	Nominated	
2019	Best Three-Way Sex Scene	"Room for One More" (with Kevin Daley and Cameron Parks)	Helix Studios	Nominated	
2019	Best Group Sex Scene	"Splash" (with Josh Brady Corbin Colby, Joey Mills, Caleb Griffith, Cameron Parks, and Luke Wilder)	Helix Studios	Won	
2020	Best Group Sex Scene	"Vegas Nights" (with Kyle Ross, Tyler Hill, Joey Mills, Cameron Parks, Julian Bell, and Corey Marshall)	Helix Studios	Nominated	
2020	Best Three-Way Sex Scene	"Vegas Nights" (with Corbin Colby and Joey Mills)	Helix Studios	Nominated	
2021	Best Quarantine Scene	"Lips Together, Six Feet Apart" (with Sean Ford)	CockyBoys	Won	
2021	Best Three-Way Sex Scene	"Winner Gets All" (with Aiden Ward and Marcus Young)	Guys in Sweatpants	Nominated	
2021	Best Actor	A Murdered Heart	Naked Sword	Won	
2021	Performer of the Year	Himself	—N/a	Nominated	
2022	Best Fetish Scene	"Boys in the Raw" (with Levi Karter)	CockyBoys	Nominated	
2026	Best Duo Sex Scene	"3 Loads for Angel" (with Lydian Grey)	Guys in Sweatpants	Nominated	

=== Grabby Awards ===
The Grabby Awards are presented by GRAB Magazine annually to honor the gay adult film industry. Rivera has received two awards from fifteen nominations.

List of awards and nominations received by Angel Rivera
Year	Category	Nominated work	Studio	Result	Ref.
2019	Best Newcomer	Himself	—N/a	Nominated	
2019	Best Twink Performer	Himself	—N/a	Nominated	
2019	Best Group	"Room for One More" (with Josh Brady, Corbin Colby, Joey Mills, Cameron Parks, Angel Rivera & Luke Wilder)	Helix Studios	Nominated	
2019	Best Group	"Vegas Nights" (with Julian Bell, Tyler Hill, Corey Marshall, Joey Mills, Cameron Parks, and Kyle Ross)	Helix Studios	Won	
2019	Best Supporting Actor	"Vegas Nights"	Helix Studios	Nominated	
2019	Hottest Flip	"Blazing Bareback" (with Andy Taylor)	Helix Studios	Nominated	
2019	Best Three-Way	"Vegas Nights" (with Corbin Colby and Joey Mills)	Helix Studios	Nominated	
2021	Performer of the Year	Himself	—N/a	Nominated	
2021	Best Actor	"A Murdered Heart"	Naked Sword	Nominated	
2021	Best Duo	"Lips Together, Six Feet Apart" (with Sean Ford)	CockyBoys	Nominated	
2021	Best Group	"Tom of Finland: Pleasure Park" (with Sean Ford, Joey Mills, River Wilson, and Tannor Reed)	Men.com	Nominated	
2021	Hottest Bottom	Himself	—N/a	Nominated	
2021	Best Versatile Performer	Himself	—N/a	Won	
2021	Hottest Body	Himself	—N/a	Nominated	
2022	Best Duo	"Let's Get Cocky" (with Dallas Preston)	CockyBoys	Nominated	

=== Str8Up Gay Porn Awards ===
The Str8Up Gay Porn Awards are hosted by the gay porn new site of the same name from 2017 to 2022. Rivera has won five awards from twelve nominations.

List of awards and nominations received by Angel Rivera
Year	Category	Nominated work	Studio	Result	Ref.
2018	Best Newcomer	Himself	—N/a	Nominated	
2018	Best Butt	Himself	—N/a	Nominated	
2018	Best Group Scene (with Joey Mills, Josh Brady, Corbin Colby, Luke Wilder, and Cameron Parks)	"Splash"	Helix Studios	Won	
2019	Favorite Gay Porn Star	Himself	—N/a	Nominated	
2019	Favorite Versatile Scene	"Wet Dreams" (with Colby Tucker)	Men.com	Nominated	
2020	Performer of the Year	Himself	—N/a	Won	
2020	Best Lead Actor	"A Murdered Heart"	Naked Sword	Nominated	
2020	Best Cum Facial	"Making Moves" (with Arad Winwin)	HotHouse Studios	Won	
2020	Favorite Quarantine-Themed Scene	"Lips Together, Six Feet Apart" (with Sean Ford)	CockyBoys	Won	
2020	Favorite Quarantine-Themed Scene	"Model Behavior: How To Make A Porn" (with Boomer Banks)	Naked Sword	Nominated	
2020	Favorite Duo Scene	"Aiden Breeds Angel" (with Aiden Ward)	Guys in Sweatpants	Won	
2022	Best Duo Scene	"Zach Astor Fucks Angel Rivera" (with Zach Astor)	CockyBoys	Nominated	

== Listicles ==
Name of publisher, year(s) listed, name of listicle, and placement result
Publication	Year	Title	Rank	Ref.
Pornhub	2024	Most Viewed Performers	24th	
Str8Up Gay Porn	2018	Best Butts	Listed	
Str8Up Gay Porn	2018	The Best Gay Porn Scenes	Listed	
Str8Up Gay Porn	2018	Most Searched-For Gay Porn Stars	39th	
Str8Up Gay Porn	2021	Most Searched-For Gay Porn Stars	14th	
Str8Up Gay Porn	2022	Most Searched-For Gay Porn Stars	20th	
