= Max Konnor =

American gay pornographic film actor

- Born: 1986 or 1987 (age 39–40); Clinton, Maryland, U.S.
- Other name: Isaiah Foxx
- Occupations: Pornographic film actor; webcam model
- Years active: 2009–2012, 2017–present
- Height: 5 ft 6 in (1.68 m)

Max Konnor (born 1986 or 1987) is an American-French gay pornographic film actor and webcam model. After starting his pornographic career under the name Isaiah Foxx in 2009, he left the industry in 2012 to pursue a career in stage and television acting. In 2017, he became a webcam model on Cam4 and started pornographic accounts on OnlyFans and Twitter. He soon started performing in studio-made pornographic films and later became the most-followed Black gay pornographic actor on Twitter and Cam4's first male ambassador.

As a pornographic film actor, he has won five Grabby Awards, five GayVN Awards—including for Performer of the Year in 2022—the XBIZ Award for Gay Performer of the Year, and two Fleshbot Awards. Outside of pornography, he was one of the subjects of the 2021 documentary Being Black in Porn, has appeared as a main cast member on the OutTV reality television series X-Rated: NYC since 2023, and starred in the off-Broadway musical Waiting in the Wings: The Musical in 2023. In 2019, he launched Haus of Konnor, a pornographic agency and studio geared toward gay pornographic actors of color.

== Career ==
Konnor was raised in Albany, Georgia. He has one older sister and has described his parents as "extremely religious", "strict", and "very protective", also describing his upbringing as "very sheltered". As a child, he was diagnosed with ADHD. He was ordained as a minister at age 14 and became a pastor at his church at age 16. After graduating from high school, he moved to New York City to attend the American Musical and Dramatic Academy and pursue a career in musical theater. While there, he realized he was gay and came out to his parents in an email. Until 2017, he worked primarily as a stage and television actor and appeared in the Comedy Central series Broad City, the Fox series Gotham, the Netflix series Master of None, and the CBS series Madam Secretary.

Konnor first began his career as a gay pornographic film actor in 2009 as Isaiah Foxx, appearing in several Lucas Entertainment films before appearing in films for other gay pornographic studios, including Treasure Island Media and Flava Works, until 2012. He began working in gay pornography again after the pilot of an ABC television series titled Salamander, which he starred in, was not picked up in October 2017. He began as a webcam model on Cam4 before starting an account on the subscription service OnlyFans and launching a pornographic Twitter account. He soon made his studio debut with the gay pornographic studio Black Rayne Productions as Max Konnor. He initially mostly appeared in films for "Black studios" alongside other Black and brown actors before performing in films for mainstream gay pornographic studios. In June 2018, he starred in a Lucas Entertainment film initially titled Black Cocks Matter, the title of which received backlash online for its play on the name of the Black Lives Matter movement and which Konnor said he had not been aware of before its release; it was soon changed to Black Cocks Rock. In January 2019, Konnor won the award for Best Duo alongside Armond Rizzo at the GayVN Awards, making them the first actors of color to both win the award, and was named gay pornographic studio Noir Male's inaugural Noir Male of the Month. At the 2019 Grabby Awards, he won the award for Best Cock. He launched the talent management agency Haus of Konnor in December 2019, which focused on representing and managing pornographic actors of color. Also in 2019, he became the most-followed Black gay pornographic actor on Twitter and the first to have more than 300,000 followers, as well as one of the most subscribed-to gay pornographic actors on subscription service JustForFans.

In March 2020, Konnor started working as a webcam model for Cam4 again, where he became the website's first male ambassador and performed in monthly solo shows. During the COVID-19 pandemic, he was contracted to do two-hour-long webcam shows. Also in 2020, he signed an exclusive contract with gay pornographic studios Falcon Entertainment and Naked Sword and won the Grabby Award for Hottest Top. In 2021, he won the XBIZ Award for Gay Performer of the Year and was one of the subjects of the documentary film Being Black in Porn, which was directed by fellow gay pornographic film actor DeAngelo Jackson. He also made his directorial debut in August 2021, directing the Noir Male film Start of the Summer, for which he was nominated for a Grabby Award. He also won the Grabby Awards for Hottest Cock and Best Three-Way, winning the latter for Tales from the Locker Room 2 alongside Beau Butler and Colton Reece, and the GayVN Award for Performer of the Year in 2022. In February 2023, Falcon Studios and Naked Sword released The Best of Max Konnor Bareback, a compilation DVD of six scenes starring Konnor. Starting in April 2023, Konnor starred as Michael in Waiting in the Wings: The Musical, an adaptation of the 2015 film of the same name about a casting mix-up between a stripper and a musical theater performer, during its off-Broadway run at the Theatre at St. Clement's. Konnor is a main cast member on the OutTV reality television series X-Rated: NYC, which premiered in September 26, 2022.

== Public image ==
Konnor identifies as demisexual and has stated that he only has sex on camera. He has also spoken against the term "BBC" and the fetishization of Black men in pornography. James Franklin of DNA called Konnor "the sweetest top in porn" in 2019, while Joshua S. Mackey of Into called Konnor one of "the biggest names in porn" in 2023. Frank J. Avella of Edge wrote that Konnor was a "porn superstar" in 2023. For Out, Mikelle Street called him a "multi award-winning studio performer with a robust presence across fan site platforms like JustForFans and OnlyFans".

== Awards and nominations ==
List of awards and nominations, with award, year, category, nominated work, result, and reference shown
Award	Year	Category	Nominee(s)	Result	Ref.
Cybersocket Web Awards	2020	Best Porn Star	Himself	Nominated	
Cybersocket Web Awards	2022	Cam Performer of the Year	Himself	Nominated	
Fleshbot Awards	2021	Gay – Best Total Package	Himself	Nominated	
Fleshbot Awards	2021	Gay – Best Social Media Personality	Himself	Nominated	
Fleshbot Awards	2021	Gay – Best Fansite Presence	Himself	Nominated	
Fleshbot Awards	2021	Gay – Best Scene	Scrum	Nominated	
Fleshbot Awards	2021	Gay – Movie of the Year	Tales from the Locker Room 2	Nominated	
Fleshbot Awards	2021	Gay – Best Group Sex Scene	Tales from the Locker Room 2	Won	
Fleshbot Awards	2022	Gay – Movie of the Year	Under the Influencer	Nominated	
Gay Fleshbot Awards	2019	Best Cock	Himself	Nominated	
Gay Fleshbot Awards	2019	Best Clip Performer	Himself	Nominated	
Gay Fleshbot Awards	2020	Performer of the Year	Himself	Nominated	
Gay Fleshbot Awards	2020	Best Body	Himself	Nominated	
Gay Fleshbot Awards	2020	Best Daddy	Himself	Won	
Gay Fleshbot Awards	2020	Best Premium Social Media Star	Himself	Nominated	
Gay Fleshbot Awards	2020	Cam Model of the Year	Himself	Nominated	
GayVN Awards	2019	Best Duo Sex Scene	Big Black Daddy	Won	
GayVN Awards	2019	Best Group Sex Scene	Fuck the Police	Nominated	
GayVN Awards	2019	Performer of the Year	Himself	Nominated	
GayVN Awards	2020	Best Actor	Feed Me Your Love	Nominated	
GayVN Awards	2020	Best Three Way Sex Scene	Feed Me Your Love	Nominated	
GayVN Awards	2020	Best Duo Sex Scene	The Hitchhiker	Nominated	
GayVN Awards	2020	Performer of the Year	Himself	Nominated	
GayVN Awards	2021	Best Fetish Scene	Super Milker	Nominated	
GayVN Awards	2021	Best Quarantine Scene	Max Konnor is So Fucking Horny for You	Nominated	
GayVN Awards	2021	Performer of the Year	Himself	Nominated	
GayVN Awards	2021	Favorite Cam Guy	Himself	Won	
GayVN Awards	2022	Best Supporting Actor	Work from Home	Nominated	
GayVN Awards	2022	Best Three-Way Sex Scene	Tales from the Locker Room 2	Nominated	
GayVN Awards	2022	Performer of the Year	Himself	Won	
GayVN Awards	2023	Best Supporting Actor	Ride or Die: Raw Deal/Hard Time	Won	
GayVN Awards	2023	Best Director – Non-Feature	Men's Briefs	Won	
GayVN Awards	2023	Best Featurette	The Gift	Nominated	
GayVN Awards	2023	Best Featurette	Give the Dog a Bone	Nominated	
GayVN Awards	2023	Performer of the Year	Himself	Nominated	
Grabby Awards	2019	Hottest Top	Himself	Nominated	
Grabby Awards	2019	Hottest Cock	Himself	Won	
Grabby Awards	2019	Best Duo	Big Black Daddy	Nominated	
Grabby Awards	2019	Performer of the Year	Himself	Nominated	
Grabby Awards	2019	Hottest Body	Himself	Nominated	
Grabby Awards	2020	Performer of the Year	Himself	Nominated	
Grabby Awards	2020	Hottest Top	Himself	Won	
Grabby Awards	2021	Performer of the Year	Himself	Nominated	
Grabby Awards	2021	Hottest Cock	Himself	Nominated	
Grabby Awards	2021	Hottest Top	Himself	Nominated	
Grabby Awards	2021	Hottest Body	Himself	Nominated	
Grabby Awards	2021	Hottest Daddy	Himself	Nominated	
Grabby Awards	2021	Wall of Fame	Himself	Won	
Grabby Awards	2022	Hottest Cock	Himself	Won	
Grabby Awards	2022	Best Director – All-Sex	Start of the Summer	Nominated	
Grabby Awards	2022	Best Threeway	Tales from the Locker Room 2	Won	
Grabby Awards	2022	Best Duo	Mountain Tops	Nominated	
Grabby Awards	2022	Best Group Scene	Dirty 30 Bareback Birthday	Nominated	
Grabby Awards	2023	Performer of the Year	Himself	Nominated	
Grabby Awards	2023	Best Supporting Actor	Under the Influencer	Nominated	
Grabby Awards	2023	Hottest Cock	Himself	Nominated	
Grabby Awards	2023	Hottest Body	Himself	Nominated	
Grabby Awards	2023	Best Director – All-Sex	Men's Briefs	Nominated	
Pornhub Awards	2020	Most Popular Gay Male Performer	Himself	Nominated	
Pornhub Awards	2020	Top Big Dick Performer	Himself	Nominated	
Pornhub Awards	2020	Top Daddy Performer	Himself	Nominated	
Pornhub Awards	2022	Most Popular Gay Male Performer	Himself	Nominated	
Pornhub Awards	2022	Top Big Dick Performer	Himself	Nominated	
Pornhub Awards	2022	Top Daddy Performer	Himself	Nominated	
Pornhub Awards	2022	Favorite Gay Model	Himself	Nominated	
Pornhub Awards	2023	Most Popular Gay Male Performer	Himself	Nominated	
Pornhub Awards	2023	Top Big Dick Performer	Himself	Nominated	
Str8UpGayPorn Awards	2019	Favorite Body	Himself	Nominated	
Str8UpGayPorn Awards	2019	Favorite Gay Porn Star	Himself	Nominated	
XBIZ Awards	2021	Gay Performer of the Year	Himself	Won	
XBIZ Awards	2021	Best Sex Scene – Gay	Freaky Cousin	Nominated	
XBIZ Awards	2021	Cam Model of the Year	Himself	Nominated	
XBIZ Awards	2022	Gay Performer of the Year	Himself	Nominated	
XBIZ Awards	2023	Gay Performer of the Year	Himself	Nominated	
XBIZ Awards	2023	Best Sex Scene – Gay	Falcon Live: 4 the Fans	Nominated	
