= It Is Not the Pornographer That Is Perverse... =

2018 film directed by Bruce LaBruce

It is Not the Pornographer That is Perverse...
- Directed by: Bruce LaBruce
- Written by: Bruce LaBruce
- Produced by: Jake Jaxson; R.J. Sebastian
- Starring: Sean Ford; Allen King; François Sagat; Colby Keller; Calvin Banks; Dato Foland
- Cinematography: Octavio Arias; Tobias Jall
- Production companies: CockyBoys; Amard Bird Films
- Release date: 14 March 2018 (Mexico)
- Running time: 69 min
- Countries: United States; Germany
- Languages: English, German

It is Not the Pornographer That is Perverse... is a 2018 English and German language collection of four gay pornographic short films directed by Bruce LaBruce for CockyBoys studio. The title refers to Rosa von Praunheim's film It Is Not the Homosexual Who Is Perverse, But the Society in Which He Lives (1971).

== Storyline ==
The movie contains four independent but interconnected and with overlapping characters, parts.

=== Part 1 Diablo en Madrid (The Devil in Madrid) ===
A devil emerges from the underworld in Madrid cemetery and begins to seduce all the men who are mourning there. An angel, played by Sean Ford, starts to watch the diabolical doings. When the angel finally confronts the devil the result is an epic battle between good and evil. The character of the reader is the same as a professor in part 2.

=== Segment 2: Über Menschen (About Humans) ===
A professor, played by Colby Keller, is visiting Madrid from Buenos Aires and contemplates to kill himself by jumping off the Viaducto de Segovia, known as a notorious site for suicides. When his young Uber driver realizes that, he talks him out of it and offers him a very personal and seducing tour of the city instead.

=== Segment 3: Purple Army Faction ===
In the near future, a terrorist group called the Purple Army Faction (PAF) has formed to reduce the population in a dangerously over-populated world by stopping people to reproduce. For that, they kidnap unsuspecting heterosexuals, one played by Francois Sagat, and sway them towards the gay cause.

=== Segment 4: Dirty Cinema (Fleapit) ===
In the seventies, a seedy movie theatre showing B-movies and softcore porn were called a "fleapit." In "Fleapit," a group of eleven people watching Bruce LaBruce's The Raspberry Reich in a theatre slowly start to flirt with each other, becoming more and more sexually aroused as they watch the porn on the screen until they become part of the porn film themselves.

== Cultural references ==
The film's title is a reference to the German director Rosa von Praunheim's 1971 iconic film It Is Not the Homosexual Who Is Perverse, But the Society in Which He Lives. Section 2 can be understood in several ways: 'about humans', 'superhumans', and 'Uber humans', referencing the ridesharing app. The Purple Army Fraction (PAF) from section 3 is a reference to the far left militant Red Army Faction, which was founded in 1970 and active until 1998.

== Cast ==
- Sean Ford as Angel in Diablo en Madrid
- Calvin Banks as Uber Driver in Über Menschen
- Allen King as Devil in Diablo en Madrid and Über Menschen
- Dato Foland as Terrorist in Purple Army Faction and member of Audience in Dirty Cinema (Fleapit)
- Levi Karter as Terrorist in Purple Army Faction and member of Audience in Dirty Cinema (Fleapit)
- François Sagat as Abductee in Purple Army Faction
- AJ Alexander as member of Audience in Dirty Cinema (Fleapit)
- Bishop Black as member of Audience in Dirty Cinema (Fleapit)

== Festivals ==
- March 2018 Guadalajara International Film Festival
- April 2018 Toronto International Porn Festival
- August 2018 BUT - B-Movie, Underground and Trash Film Festival
- October 2018 Berlin Porn Film Festival
- November 2018 Fringe! Queer Film & Arts Festival, United Kingdom
- November 2018 Chéries-Chéris Film Festival, Paris
- April 2019 Vienna Porn Film Festival
- June 2019 TLVFest, Israel
