= Lane Rogers =

American pornographic actor (1994–2025)

- Born: August 14, 1994; Versailles, Kentucky, U.S.
- Died: December 15, 2025 (aged 31); Oxnard, California, U.S.
- Other name: Blake Mitchell
- Education: University of Kentucky
- Occupation: Pornographic actor
- Years active: 2015–2025

Lane Vincent Rogers (August 14, 1994 – December 15, 2025), also known as Blake Mitchell, was an American pornographic actor, YouTuber, Twitch streamer and adult webcam model.

== Early life and career ==
Rogers was born in Lexington, Kentucky, and grew up in Versailles. Before starting his career in the pornography industry, he worked in several restaurants. In February 2014, he began modelling on the webcam site Chaturbate, where he gained recognition from porn producer Casey Roman. Shortly after, he established a collaboration with the film studio Helix Studios and debuted with a scene in the December 2014 film Take it from Blake. He also appeared in films produced by Himeros.tv. In January 2019, he announced the end of his collaboration with Helix Studios.

In 2018, he won the industry's Grabby Award for the categories of hottest penis and best group sex scene (in the film Breathe). That same year, he received awards at the GayVN Awards in the following categories: best group sex scene (in Lifeguards), best twink scene (in Boys Night), favorite cam boy and favorite body.

In 2020, at the Str8UpGayPorn Awards, he received the Performer of the Year and Scene of the Year awards for the film Blake Mitchell Is An American in Prague. In 2021, he appeared in his first heterosexual pornographic scene.

== Personal life and death ==
Rogers came out as bisexual and had a brief relationship with fellow actor Casey Tanner. He was later in a relationship with Chad Alec Estrella Jackson. In 2019, he requested that he no longer be referred to as Blake Mitchell and that his real name be used.

In 2022, he began studying at the University of Kentucky.

On December 15, 2025, Rogers died from blunt force head trauma in a traffic accident in Oxnard Plain, California. While he was riding his motorcycle on a coastal highway, a collision occurred between himself and a box truck in the highway median. He was 31. As of December 17, the cause of the accident was being investigated.

== Notable works ==
- Lifeguards: Summer Session (2016)
- Blake Mitchell Is An American In Prague (2020)
- Hollywood And Vine (2020)

== Awards and nominations ==
Year	Prize	Category	Nominated work	Result	Ref.
2016	Grabby Awards	Hottest Cock	Himself	Nominated	
2016	Grabby Awards	Best Group (3 or more)	Mirage (Note: shared with Kody Knight, Andy Taylor and Brad Chase)	Nominated	
2016	Grabby Awards	Best Duo	Raw Exposure (Note: shared with Casey Tanner)	Nominated	
2017	Str8UpGayPorn Awards	Best Performer	Himself	Nominated	
2017	Str8UpGayPorn Awards	Best Supporting Actor	Lifeguards	Won	
2017	Str8UpGayPorn Awards	Best Cock	Himself	Nominated	
2017	Str8UpGayPorn Awards	Best Gay Porn Newsmaker	Blake Mitchell's Bottoming Debut For Sean Ford	Nominated	
2017	Str8UpGayPorn Awards	Best Group Scene	Lifeguards (Note: shared with Kyle Ross, Max Carter, Joey Mills, Tyler Hill and Evan Parker)	Nominated	
2017	Str8UpGayPorn Awards	Best Duo Scene	Fair Game (Note: shared with Justin Owen)	Nominated	
2017	Grabby Awards	Hottest Top	Himself	Nominated	
2017	Grabby Awards	Best Group	Lifeguards (Note: shared with Evan Parker, Tyler Hill, Kyle Ross, Max Carter and Joey Mills)	Nominated	
2018	GayVN Awards	Best Group Sex Scene	Lifeguards	Won	
2018	GayVN Awards	Best Twink Scene	Boys Night (Note: shared with Logan Cross, Colton James and Sean Ford)	Won	
2018	GayVN Awards	Best Twink Scene	Proteín (Note: shared with Corbin Colby)	Nominated	
2018	GayVN Awards	Favorite Body	Himself	Won	
2018	GayVN Awards	Favorite Cam Boy	Himself	Won	
2018	Grabby Awards	Hottest Cock	Himself	Won	
2018	Grabby Awards	Best Group Scene	Breathe (Note: shared with Wes Campbell, Corbin Colby, Sean Ford and Joey Mills)	Won	
2018	Grabby Awards	Best Versatil Performer	Himself	Nominated	
2018	Grabby Awards	Performer of the Year	Himself	Nominated	
2019	Grabby Awards	Hottest Top	Himself	Nominated	
2019	Grabby Awards	Hottest Cock	Himself	Nominated	
2019	Grabby Awards	Performer of the Year	Himself	Nominated	
2019	Grabby Awards	Best 3 Way	Spitroasted (Note: shared with Corbin Colby and Clay Turner)	Nominated	
2019	Grabby Awards	Best Duo	Mine (Note: shared with Joey Mills)	Nominated	
2019	GayVN Awards	Best Duo Sex Scene	Mine	Nominated	
2020	Str8UpGayPorn Awards	Artist of the Year	Himself	Won	
2020	Str8UpGayPorn Awards	Scene of the Year	Blake Mitchell Is An American In Prague (Note: Eluan Jeunet and Andréi Karenin)	Won	
2020	Str8UpGayPorn Awards	Best Supporting Actor	Hollywood And Vine	Nominated	
2020	Str8UpGayPorn Awards	Best Scene Of The Year	Hollywood And Vine (Note: shared with Avery Jones)	Nominated	
2020	GayVN Awards	Best Group Sex Scene	Winter Break 10: Keeping Warm (Note: shared with Julian Bell, Jamie Ray, Milo Harper, Trevor Harris, Caleb Gray, Riley Finch and Taylor Coleman)	Nominated	
2020	GayVN Awards	Best Supporting Actor	Winter Break 10: Keeping Warm	Nominated	
2020	GayVN Awards	Favorite Body	Himself	Won	
2024	Grabby Awards Europe	Best Scene	Blake Mitchell and Sven Basquiat for Bel Ami	Nominated	
