= List of LGBTQ-related films of 2017 =

This is a list of lesbian, gay, bisexual, transgender or queer-related films released in 2017. It contains theatrically released films that deal with important gay, lesbian, bisexual, transgender or queer characters or issues and may have same-sex romance or relationships as a plot device.

== Films ==
Title	Director	Country	Genre	Cast	Notes	Ref
Abu	Arshad Khan	Canada	Documentary			
Alifu, the Prince/ss	Wang Yu-lin	Taiwan	Drama	Utjung Tjakivalid		
Allure	Carlos and Jason Sanchez	Canada	Thriller drama	Evan Rachel Wood, Julia Sarah Stone, Denis O'Hare, Maxim Roy		
Anything	Timothy McNeil	United States	Romantic drama	John Carroll Lynch, Matt Bomer, Maura Tierney, Margot Bingham, Michael Boatman, Tanner Buchanan, Micah Hauptman		
Axolotl Overkill	Helene Hegemann	Germany	Drama	Jasna Fritzi Bauer, Arly Jover, Mavie Hörbiger	Based on Hegemann's novel of the same name	
Battle of the Sexes	Jonathan Dayton, Valerie Faris	United States	Comedy-drama, Sport	Emma Stone, Steve Carell, Andrea Riseborough, Sarah Silverman, Bill Pullman, Alan Cumming, Elisabeth Shue, Austin Stowell, Natalie Morales, Jessica McNamee, Fred Armisen, Lewis Pullman, Martha MacIsaac, Mickey Sumner, Bridey Elliott, Eric Christian Olsen, Wallace Langham, Matt Malloy, James Mackay	Loosely based on the 1973 tennis match between Billie Jean King and Bobby Riggs	
Bayard & Me	Matt Wolf	United States	Documentary, Short	Bayard Rustin, Walter Naegle		
Beach Rats	Eliza Hittman	United States	Drama	Harris Dickinson, Madeline Weinstein, Kate Hodge, Neal Huff		
Body Electric (Corpo Elétrico)	Marcelo Caetano	Brazil	Drama			
Bones of Contention	Andrea Weiss	United States	Documentary	Miguel Ángel Muñoz (Narrator), Laura García Lorca, Emilio Silva, Antoni Ruiz, Isabel Franc, Empar Pineda, Fernando Valverde, Silvia Reyes, Miguel Caballero	Stories of LGBT people during Spain's fascist regime	
BPM (Beats per Minute)	Robin Campillo	France	Drama	Nahuel Pérez Biscayart, Arnaud Valois, Adèle Haenel, Antoine Reinartz, Felix Marituad, Médhi Touré, Aloïse Sauvage, Simon Bourgade, Catherine Vinatier, Saadia Ben Taieb, Ariel Borenstein, Théophile Ray, Simon Guélat, Jean François Auguste		
The Cakemaker	Ofir Raul Grazier	Israel; Germany	Drama	Sarah Adler, Zohar Strauss, Tim Kalkhof, Roy Miller, Tamir Ben-Yehuda		
Call Me by Your Name	Luca Guadagnino	Italy	Drama	Armie Hammer, Timothée Chalamet, Michael Stuhlbarg, Amira Casar, Esther Garrel, Victoire Du Bois	Based on the novel by André Aciman	
The Carmilla Movie	Spencer Maybee	Canada	Drama	Natasha Negovanlis, Elise Bauman, Dominique Provost-Chalkley, Annie M. Briggs (credited as Annie Briggs), K Alexander (credited as Kaitlyn Alexander), Nicole Stamp, Grace Lynn Kung, Cara Gee	Based on the web series Carmilla, which itself is loosely based on the Gothic novella of the same name by Sheridan Le Fanu	
Casa Roshell	Camila José Donoso	Mexico; Chile	Documentary	Roshell Terranova, Liliana Alba, Lia García, Diego Alberico, Cristian Aravena	Casa Roshell is a place where men who want to be women in secret	
Casting	Nicolas Wackerbarth	Germany	Comedy, Drama	Toby Ashraf, Susanne Beier, Milena Dreißig, Judith Engel, Stephan Grossmann, Tim Kalkhof, Corinna Kirchhoff, Ursina Lardi, Andreas Lust		
The Chances	Anna Kerrigan	United States	Drama	Josh Feldman, Shoshonnah Stern		
Chavela	Catherine Gund, Daresha Kyi Hauptsächlich	United States	Documentary	Chavela Vargas		
Close-Knit ( 彼らが本気で編むときは、)	Naoko Ogigami	Japan	Drama	Toma Ikuta, Kenta Kiritani, Rinka Kakihara, Rie Mimura (credited as Mimura), Eiko Koike, Mugi Kadowaki, Shuji Kashiwabara		
Coby	Christian Sonderegger	France	Documentary	Coby, Jacob Hunt, Sara Mound, Ellen Richards-Hunt	Story of a transgender person and family in Ohio	
The Death and Life of Marsha P. Johnson	David France	United States	Documentary		Explores the activism and death of Marsha P. Johnson	
Discreet	Travis Mathews	United States	Drama	Jonny Mars, Atsuko Okatsuka, Joy Cunningham, Jordan Elsass, João Federici, Ed Hattaway		
Disobedience	Sebastián Lelio	United Kingdom	Drama	Rachel Weisz, Rachel McAdams, Alessandro Nivola, Anton Lesser	Based on the novel by Naomi Alderman	
Dream Boat (2017 Film)	Tristan Ferland Milewski	Germany	Documentary	Michael A., Amit, Michael Anastasio, Ansgar, Daniel B.	On a cruise only for gay men promising seven days of sunshine, love and freedom, appear five men from five countries	
Dressed for Pleasure (Je fais où tu me dis)	Marie de Maricourt	Switzerland	Short	Angélique Bridoux, Nathalie Cuenet, Naëlle Dariya, Vincent Chaumont, Raphaël Tschudi	17 mins long	
Escape from Rented Island: The Lost Paradise of Jack Smith	Jerry Tartaglia	United States	Documentary	Archive footage of; Jack Smith (film director), Mario Montez, Beverly Grant, Tony Conrad, Agosto Machado, Francis Francine (actress), Irving Rosenthal (journalist), Tally Brown, Mary Waronor,		
A Fantastic Woman (Una mujer fantástica)	Sebastián Lelio	Chile	Drama	Daniela Vega, Francisco Reyes Morandé (credited as Fransisco Reyes), Luis Gnecco, Aline Küppenheim, Amparo Noguera		
The Feels	Jenée LeMarque	United States	Comedy	Constance Wu, Angela Trimbur, Josh Fadem, Ever Mainard		
Final Stage	Nicolaas Schmidt	Germany	Short	Aaron Hilmer and Fynn Grossmann	27 min (happy end) or 32 min (sad end)	
Fluidø	Shu Lea Cheang	Germany	Science fiction	Caprice Crawford, William E. Morris		
For Nonna Anna	Luis De Filippis	Canada	Short drama	Maya Henry, Jacqueline Tarne		
Freak Show	Trudie Styler	United States	Drama	Alex Lawther, Abigail Breslin, Bette Midler, Larry Pine, AnnaSophia Robb, Ian Nelson, Lorraine Toussaint, Laverne Cox, Willa Fitzgerald, Celia Weston	Based on the novel of the same name by James St. James	
God's Own Country	Francis Lee	United Kingdom	Drama	Josh O'Connor, Alec Secăreanu, Ian Hart, Gemma Jones		
Golden Years	André Téchiné	France	Drama	Pierre Deladonchamps, Céline Sallette, Grégoire Leprince-Ringuet	Based on the non fiction book La garconne et l'assassin (The Flapper and the Killer) by Fabrice Virgili and Daniele Voldman	
Hello Again	Tom Gustafson	United States	Musical	Audra McDonald, Martha Plimpton, T. R. Knight, Cheyenne Jackson	Based on the musical by Michael John LaChiusa	
Hidden Kisses	Didier Bivel	France	Drama	Bérenger Anceaux		
How to Talk to Girls at Parties	John Cameron Mitchell	United States; United Kingdom	Science fiction, romantic comedy	Elle Fanning, Alex Sharp, Nicole Kidman, Ruth Wilson, Matt Lucas	Based on the short story of the same name by Neil Gaiman	
I Dream in Another Language (Sueño en otro idioma)	Ernesto Contreras	Mexico	Drama	Fernando Álvarez Rebeil, José Manuel Poncelis, Eligo Meléndez, Fátima Molina, Norma Angélica		
If Not Love	Rose Troche	United States	Short, Drama	Zachary Booth, Mitchell Winter		
In a Heartbeat	Esteban Bravo, Beth David	United States	Animated short			
Just Like Our Parents (Como nossos pais)	Laís Bodanzky	Brazil	Drama	Maria Ribeiro, Paulo Vilhena, Felipe Rocha, Sophia Valverde, Jorge Mautner		
Marguerite	Marianne Farley	Canada	Short, Drama	Béatrice Picard, Sandrine Bisson		
Marlina the Murderer in Four Acts	Mouly Surya	Indonesia	Drama	Marsha Timothy, Yoga Pratama, Egy Fedly, Dea Panendra		
Method	Bang Eun-jin	South Korea	Drama	Park Sung-woong, Yoon Seung-ah		
The Misandrists	Bruce LaBruce	Germany; Canada	Drama	Susanne Sachße, Viva Ruiz, Kembra Pfahler, Caprice Crawford, Grete Gehrke		
A Moment in the Reeds	Mikko Mäkelä	Finland	Romantic drama	Janne Puustinen, Boodi Kabbani	Most dialogue in English	
Montana	Limor Shmila	Israel	Drama	Noa Biron, Netta Shpigelman, Avi Malka, Keren Tsur		
My Days of Mercy	Tali Shalom Ezer	United Kingdom	Drama	Elliot Page, Kate Mara, Amy Seimetz, Brian Geraghty, Elias Koteas		
My Gay Sister (Min Homosyster)	Lia Hietala	Sweden; Norway	Short	Erika Coleman, Tina Pour Davoy, Juliette Safavi	15 mins long	
My Wonderful West Berlin (Mein wunderbares West-Berlin)	Jochen Hick	Germany	Documentary, Biography, History	Mabel Aschenneller, Wolfgang Cihlarz, Rolf Eden, Egmont Fassbinder, Romy Haag, Peter Hedenström (Journalist), Gerhard Hoffmann, Manuela Kay, René Koch, Patsy L'Amour LaLove, Wilfried Laule, Dirk Ludigs (Journalist), Detlef Mücke (politician), Wolfgang Müller (actor and comedian) and Aron Neubert		
Never Steady, Never Still	Kathleen Hepburn	Canada	Drama	Shirley Henderson, Nicholas Campbell, Theodore Pellerin		
The Prince of Nothingwood (also known as Nothingwood)	Sonia Kronlund	France; Germany	Documentary	Qurban Ali Afzali (cross dressing actor) and Salim Shaheen (director)	Follows a film mogul in Afghanistan and his actor friend	
Neruppu Da	B. Ashok Kumar	India	Thriller	Vikram Prabhu, Nikki Galrani, Sangeetha Krish, Madhusudhan Rao, Vincent Asokan		
On My Way Out: The Secret Life of Nani and Popi	Brandon Gross, Skyler Gross	Canada	Documentary	Ruth Blank, Roman Blank		
Out of Exile: Daniel's Story	Nonny de la Peña	United States	Documentary, Short	Daniel Ashley Pierce		
The Party	Sally Potter	United Kingdom	Comedy	Patricia Clarkson, Bruno Ganz, Cherry Jones, Emily Mortimer, Cillian Murphy, Kristin Scott Thomas, Timothy Spall		
Paths (Ein Weg)	Chris Miera	Germany	Drama	Mike Hoffmann, Mathis Reinhardt, Cai Cohrs, Tom Böttcher, Eva Horacek		
Porcupine Lake	Ingrid Veninger	Canada	Drama	Delphine Roussel, Christopher Bolton, Lucinda Armstrong Hall		
Pre-Drink	Marc-Antoine Lemire	Canada	Short, Drama	Alex Trahan, Pascale Drevillon		
Princess Cyd	Stephen Cone	United States	Drama	Rebecca Spence, Jessie Pinnick		
Professor Marston and the Wonder Women	Angela Robinson	United States	Drama	Luke Evans, Rebecca Hall, Bella Heathcote, JJ Field, Oliver Platt, Connie Britton	Biopic of American psychologist William Moulton Marston	
Queercore: How to Punk a Revolution	Yony Leyser	Germany	Documentary	Bruce LaBruce, G. B. Jones, Lynn Breedlove		
Rebels on Pointe	Bobbi Jo Hart	Canada	Documentary	Les Ballets Trockadero de Monte Carlo		
Retablo	Alvaro Delgado-Aparicio	Peru	Drama	Junior Béjar Roca, Amiel Cayo, Magaly Solier		
Rough Night	Lucia Aniello	United States	Comedy	Scarlett Johansson, Kate McKinnon, Jillian Bell, Zoë Kravitz		
Saturday Church	Damon Cardasis	United States	Musical, drama	Margot Bingham, Regina Taylor, Mj Rodriguez, Indya Moore		
Scotty and the Secret History of Hollywood	Matt Tyrnauer	United States	Documentary	Scotty Bowers		
Sebastian	James Fanizza	Canada	Romantic drama	James Fanizza, Guifré Bantjes-Rafols, Alex House, Brian McCook	Expansion of the 2014 short film of the same name, which was also written by Fanizza, but directed by Ricky Bryant	
Signature Move	Jennifer Reeder	United States	Romantic comedy	Fawzia Mirza, Shabana Azmi, Sari Sanchez		
Skins (Pieles)	Eduardo Casanova	Spain	Drama	Macarena Gómez, Carolina Bang, Jon Kortajarena, Candela Peña, Carmen Machi		
Small Talk (Ri Chang Dui Hua)	Hui-chen Huang	Taiwan	Documentary	Huang (director) and her lesbian mother A-nu (also a Taoist priestess)		
Soldiers, Story from Ferentari	Ivana Mladenovic	Romania	Drama	Vasile Pavel, Adrian Schiop, Ștefan Iancu, Dan Bursuc		
Speech & Debate	Dan Harris	United States	Dramedy	Liam James, Sarah Steele, Austin P. McKenzie, Roger Bart, Janeane Garofalo, Wendi McLendon-Covey, Kal Penn, Kimberly Williams-Paisley, Skylar Astin, Lin-Manuel Miranda, Ryan Lee, Darren Criss, Lucy DeVito, Sarah Baker, Lester Speight, Jeremy Rowley	Screenplay by Stephen Karam, based on his play of the same name	
Take a Walk on the Wildside	Lisa Rideout	Canada	Documentary	Patricia Ann Aldridge	About a clothing store in Toronto, Ontario which caters to the unique needs of cross-dressing men	
Tellin' Dad	André D Chambers	United Kingdom	Short, drama	Carl Loughlin, Michael Byron, Ricky Tomlinson		
The Taste of Betel Nut (Bing lang xue)	Hu Jia	Hong Kong	Drama	Bingrui Zhao, Yue Yue, Shen Shi Yu		
Thelma	Joachim Trier	Norway	Supernatural drama	Eili Harboe, Kaya Wilkins, Henrik Rafaelsen, Ellen Dorrit Petersen		
They	Anahita Ghazvinizadeh	United States	Drama	Rhys Fehrenbacher		
This Is Everything: Gigi Gorgeous	Barbara Kopple	United States	Documentary	Gigi Gorgeous		
Tom of Finland	Dome Karukoski	Finland	Drama	Pekka Strang, Lauri Tilkanen, Jessica Grabowsky	Biography of Finnish homoerotic artist, Touko Laaksonen	
Transformer	Michael Del Monte	Canada	Documentary	Janae Kroc		
Ulrike's Brain	Bruce LaBruce	Canada; Germany	Drama	Susanne Sachße		
Venus	Eisha Marjara	Canada	Comedy-drama	Debargo Sanyal, Jamie Mayers, Zena Darawalla, Pierre-Yves Cardinal, Amber Goldfarb, Gordon Warnecke		
We Forgot to Break Up	Chandler Levack	Canada	Short, Drama	Jesse Todd, Cara Gee, Steven McCarthy, Mark Rendall	Adapted from the novel Heidegger Stairwell by Kayt Burgess	
Wild Mouse (Wilde Maus)	Josef Hader	Austria	Comedy	Josef Hader, Pia Hierzegger		
The Wound	John Trengove	South Africa	Drama	Nakhane Touré, Bongile Mantsai, Niza Jay Ncoyini		
