= Bruce LaBruce =

Canadian filmmaker and artist

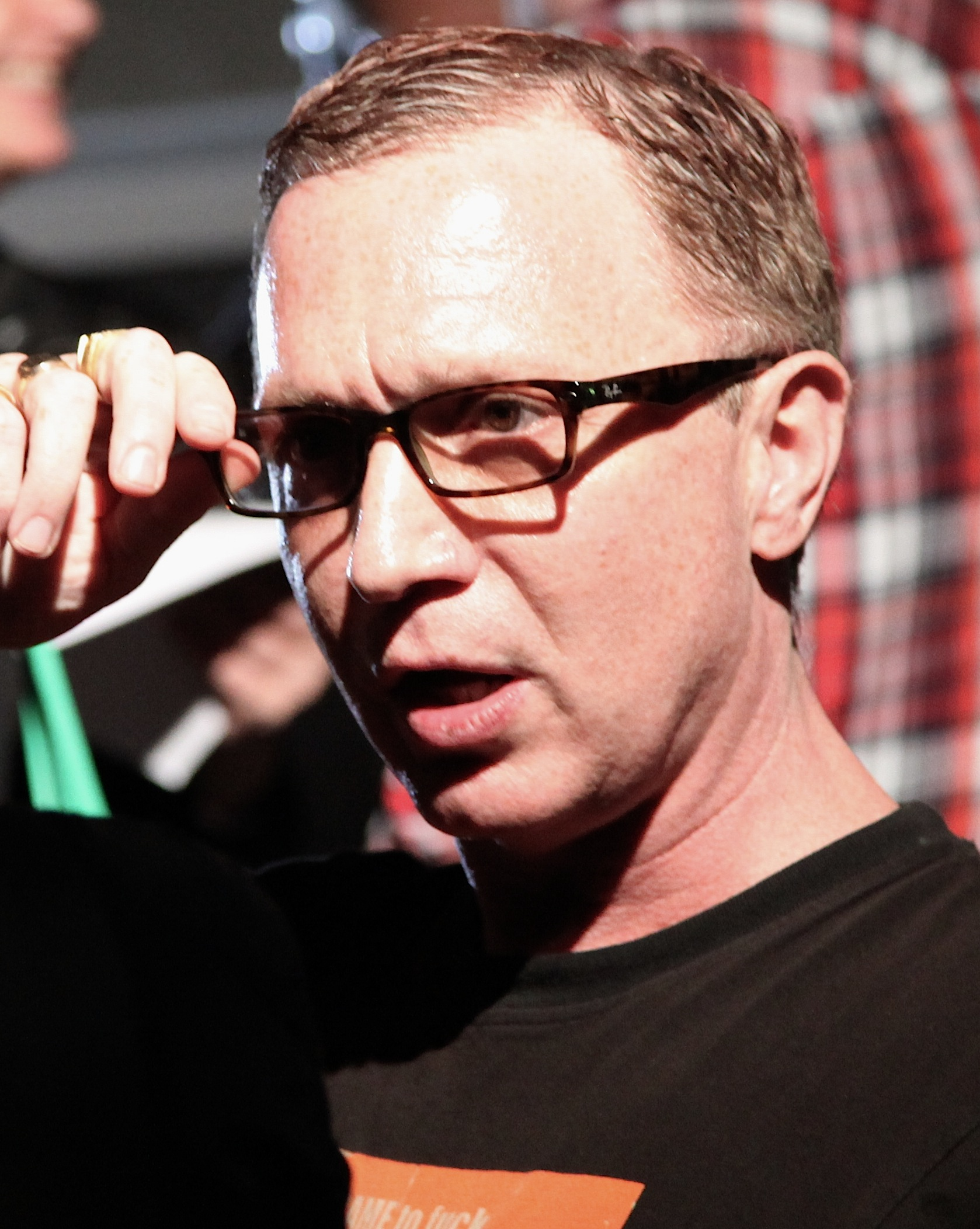
- LaBruce in 2011
- Born: January 3, 1964 (age 62); Southampton, Ontario, Canada
- Occupations: Actor; writer; filmmaker; photographer; underground adult director
- Years active: 1987–present
- Website: brucelabruce.com (Archived)

Bruce LaBruce (born January 3, 1964) is a Canadian artist, writer, filmmaker, photographer, and underground director based in Toronto. He is notable for being a pioneer of the queercore punk rock movement.

== Life and career ==
LaBruce was born in Tiverton, Ontario. He has claimed both Justin Stewart and Bryan Bruce as his birth name in different sources. He studied film at York University in Toronto and wrote for Cineaction magazine, curated by Robin Wood, his teacher.

He first gained public attention with the publication of the queer punk zine J.D.s, which he co-edited with G.B. Jones. He has written and photographed for a variety of publications including Vice, the former Nerve.com and BlackBook Magazine, and has been a columnist for the Canadian music magazine Exclaim! and Toronto's Eye Weekly, as well as a contributing editor and photographer for New York's Index Magazine. He has also been published in Toronto Life, the National Post and The Guardian.

His film, Otto; or, Up with Dead People debuted at the 2008 Sundance Film Festival. L.A. Zombie was banned from the Melbourne International Film Festival in 2010 because, in the opinion of Australian censors, it would have been refused classification. However, the film was subsequently able to screen at OutTakes, a New Zealand lesbian and gay international film festival, in May 2011.

In March 2011, LaBruce directed a performance of Arnold Schoenberg's opera Pierrot Lunaire at the Hebbel am Ufer Theatre in Berlin. This iteration of the opera included gender diversity, castration scenes and dildos, as well as portraying Pierrot as a transgender man. He subsequently also filmed this adaptation as the 2014 theatrical film Pierrot Lunaire.

Beginning with Gerontophilia in 2013, LaBruce dropped some of the more sexually explicit aspects of his filmmaking style. He retained his traditional interest in exploring sexual taboos, dramatizing an intergenerational relationship between a young man and a senior citizen, but opted to do so within a film that would be more palatable to a mainstream audience.

In 2018, LaBruce directed the short film Scotch Egg as part of Erika Lust's XConfessions series. The short is about a Scottish gay man who has sex with a woman in a gay bar. LaBruce was inspired to create the film after reading a confession sent to XConfessions by a heterosexual woman who fantasized about going to a gay bar and having sex with a homosexual man.

His short film collection It Is Not the Pornographer That Is Perverse... was released in 2018. The title refers to Rosa von Praunheim's film It Is Not the Homosexual Who Is Perverse, But the Society in Which He Lives (1971).

In 2024, his film The Visitor was selected in the Panorama section at the 74th Berlin International Film Festival where it premiered February 17.

== Themes and style ==
According to Courtney Fathom Sell of South Coast Today, some of his films explore themes of sexual and interpersonal transgression against cultural norms, frequently blending the artistic and production techniques of independent film with gay pornography.

LaBruce's filmmaking style is marked by a blend of explicitly pornographic depictions of sex with more conventional narrative and filmmaking techniques, as well as an interest in extreme topics which mainstream audiences might dismiss as shocking or disturbing taboos. For instance, his films have depicted scenes of sexual fetish and paraphilia, BDSM, gang rape, racially-motivated violence, amputee fetishism, gerontophilia, male and female prostitution, twincest, and zombie and vampire sexuality.

He has frequently been identified with the New Queer Cinema movement that emerged in the 1990s, although at the height of that movement's prominence, he rejected the association on the grounds that he felt more personally aligned with the queercore movement. The queercore movement was born in the 1980s and LaBruce was one of the fathers. Noted as the avant-garde and unapologetic gay answer to the punk movement, queercore expressed the very same discontent with society as the punks were stating.

== Filmography ==
=== Feature films ===
- No Skin Off My Ass (1991)
- Super 8½ (1994)
- Hustler White (1996), co-directed & written with Rick Castro
- Skin Flick / Skin Gang (1999)
- The Raspberry Reich (2004)
- Otto; or, Up with Dead People (2008)
- L.A. Zombie (2010)
- Gerontophilia (2013)
- Pierrot Lunaire (2014)
- The Misandrists (2017)
- Ulrike's Brain (2017)
- It is Not the Pornographer That is Perverse... (2018) for CockyBoys studio
- Saint-Narcisse (2020)
- The Affairs of Lidia (2022)
- The Visitor (2024)

=== Short films ===
- Boy, Girl (1987)
- I Know What It's Like to Be Dead (1987)
- Bruce and Pepper Wayne Gacy's Home Movies (1988), co-directed with Candy Parker
- A Case for the Closet (1992)
- The Post Queer Tour (1992)
- Slam! (1992)
- Come As You Are (2000)
- Give Piece of Ass a Chance (2007)
- The Bad Breast, or The Case of Theda Lange (2010)
- Weekend in Alphaville (2010)
- Défense de fumer (2014)
- Refugee's Welcome (2017)
- Scotch Egg (2018)
- Valentin, Pierre and Catalina (2018)
- 30/30 Vision: 3 Decades of Strand Releasing (segment "Homage to Blow Job") (2019)

== Books ==
- Ride Queer, Ride (1996)
- The Reluctant Pornographer (1997)

== Awards ==
- 2019: XBIZ Award – Gay Director of the Year
