= The Misandrists =

2017 film

- Film poster
- Directed by: Bruce LaBruce
- Written by: Bruce LaBruce
- Starring: Susanne Sachße
- Cinematography: James Carman
- Edited by: Judy Landkammer
- Release dates: 13 February 2017 (Berlin); 2 November 2017 (Germany)
- Running time: 91 minutes
- Country: Germany
- Language: English

The Misandrists is a 2017 English-language German drama film directed by Bruce LaBruce. It was screened in the Panorama section at the 67th Berlin International Film Festival.

The film centres on a radical feminist group plotting a revolution to overthrow patriarchy in Germany. It is thematically linked with LaBruce's shorter film Ulrike's Brain, which premiered in the Berlin Film Festival's Forum program in the same week.

== Cast ==
- Susanne Sachße as Big Mother
- Viva Ruiz as Sister Dagmar
- Kembra Pfahler as Sister Kembra
- Caprice Crawford as Sister Barbara
- Grete Gehrke as Sister Grete

== Reception ==
On the review aggregator website Rotten Tomatoes, 75% of 36 critics' reviews are positive. The website's consensus reads: "The Misandrists mounts a memorably gonzo assault on the patriarchy — one whose wild ambition and outré aesthetic are often enough to cover for its uneven execution." Metacritic, which uses a weighted average, assigned the film a score of 56 out of 100, based on 11 critics, indicating "mixed or average" reviews.

== See also ==
- List of LGBT-related films of 2017
