= Pierrot Lunaire (film) =

- Directed by: Bruce LaBruce
- Written by: Bruce LaBruce
- Produced by: Tomas Liska; Anna Mülter
- Starring: Susanne Sachsse; Luizo Vega; Maria Ivanenko
- Cinematography: Tomas Liska
- Music by: Arnold Schoenberg
- Distributed by: Die Lamb
- Release date: 9 February 2014 (Berlin)
- Running time: 51 minutes
- Countries: Canada; Germany
- Language: German

Pierrot Lunaire is a Canadian/German film, which premiered at the 2014 Berlin Film Festival.

Written and directed by Bruce LaBruce as an adaptation of Arnold Schoenberg's Pierrot lunaire, the film adds a transgender interpretation to the work, starring Susanne Sachsse as a trans man Pierrot. It originated as a theatrical production of Pierrot Lunaire, which LaBruce directed for Berlin's Hebbel am Ufer theatre in 2011.

The costumes were designed by Zaldy.

The film won a Jury Award from the 2014 Teddy Award jury.
