= Joey Mills =

American pornographic actor (born 1998)

- Born: May 20, 1998 (age 28); Missouri, US
- Occupation: Pornographic film actor
- Years active: 2016–present
- Website: joey-mills.com

Joey Mills (born May 20, 1998) is an American pornographic actor, known initially for his films for Helix Studios, and later with other studios including Men.com. Primarily a bottom performer, Mills was considered one of the most recognizable twinks in the industry and won numerous awards for his work. In 2021, he was the most searched-for gay porn star on the internet according to the website Str8Up Gay Porn, and was the second-most searched gay performer on Pornhub in 2023.

== Career ==
Mills was born in 1998 in St. Louis, Missouri, where he was also raised. Mills worked as a pizza delivery driver in his youth. In 2016, at 18, he entered the world of gay pornography, where his youthful appearance attracted attention. He initially applied to be a Helix Studios model as a joke before getting a call back and flying out to the studio. He filmed his first pornographic scene with actor Justin Owen, and the first scene of his to be released was alongside actor Tyler Hill. Since then, he has appeared in more than 20 pornographic films and series, including The Men Twink Pop series. He has received numerous awards for his frequent portrayals of twinks (young gay men).

From 2016 to 2019, Mills worked exclusively for Helix Studios (a production company specializing in twink gay pornography). After appearing in more than a dozen productions, he announced his departure from the studio in 2019. In the summer of that same year, he signed an exclusive contract with Men.com.

With Taylor Saracen, Mills co-authored the book Electric Soul, published by Helix Studios in 2019. In it, he points out that it is a journey of self-discovery, as well as a moving and unconventional story about the relationship between a troubled teenager and his mother as they face life's challenges.

Mills won the GayVN Award for Best Twink in 2020. By 2023, Mills had over 700,000 followers on Twitter. Mills was the second most-searched gay pornographic film actor of 2023 on Pornhub. According to Str8UpGayPorn, Mills ranked 32nd in 2017 and 23rd in 2018 among the most searched gay porn actors on the internet. In 2021, he ranked first on that list. In 2023, he became the second most searched pornographic film star on Pornhub, after Malik Delgaty.

Ricky Cornish of Pride.com called Mills "one of the most recognizable Twinks in the adult entertainment industry". Mills has advocated for higher pay for actors in the gay pornographic film industry.

== Filmography ==
Year	Title	Notes	Ref.
2016-2018	Helix Studios	Helix Studios Anthology Series	
2017	Flower	Short film	
2019	A Tale of Two Cock Destroyers	Men.com film	
2022	Buttering His Popcorn	Men.com and Str8UpGayPorn film	
2022-present	X-Rated: NYC	Lead; OUTtv Original Series	
2023	Hot Haus	Guest star; Season 2; OUTtv Original Series	
2024	School of Hard Cocks	Men.com film	
2026	DIY Dungeon	OUTtv Original Series; host	

== Awards and nominations ==
List of awards and nominations received by Joey Mills
Year	Award	Category	Nominated work	Result	Ref.
2017	Grabby Awards	Twink Performer	Himself	Nominated	
2017	Grabby Awards	Best Actor	Raw Talent (Helix Studios)	Nominated	
2017	Grabby Awards	Best Group	Lifeguards (Helix Studios) (Note: shared with Evan Parker, Tyler Hill, Kyle Ross, Max Carter, and Blake Mitchell.)	Nominated	
2017	Str8UpGayPorn Awards	Best Group Scene	Lifeguards (Helix Studios)	Nominated	
2018	GayVN Awards	Best Group Sex Scene	Lifeguards (Helix Studios)	Won	
2018	GayVN Awards	Favorite Twink	Himself	Won	
2018	Grabby Awards	Twink Performer	Himself	Nominated	
2018	Grabby Awards	Hottest Bottom	Himself	Nominated	
2018	Grabby Awards	Performer of the Year	Himself	Nominated	
2018	Grabby Awards	Best Group	Breathe (Helix Studios) (Note: shared with Wes Campbell, Corbin Colby, Sean Ford, and Blake Mitchell)	Won	
2018	Grabby Awards	Best Group	Vegas Pride Afterparty (Helix Studios) (Note: shared with Cole Claire, Cameron Parks and, Ashton Summers.)	Nominated	
2018	Grabby Awards	Best Duo	Raw Rollers (Helix Studios) (Note: shared with Cole Claire.)	Nominated	
2018	Grabby Awards	Hottest Flip	Beach Bodies (Helix Studios) (Note: shared with Josh Brady.)	Nominated	
2018	Pornhub Awards	Top Twink Performer	Himself	Won	
2019	Grabby Awards	Best Twink Performer	Himself	Won	
2019	Grabby Awards	Hottest Bottom	Himself	Nominated	
2019	Grabby Awards	Performer of the Year	Himself	Nominated	
2019	Grabby Awards	Best Group	Vegas Nights (Helix Studios) (Note: shared with Julian Bell, Tyler Hill, Corey Marshall, Cameron Parks, Angel Rivera, and Kyle Ross.)	Won	
2019	Grabby Awards	Best Group	Room for One More (Helix Studios) (Note: shared with Josh Brady, Corbin Colby, Cameron Parks, Angel Rivera, and Luke Wilder.)	Nominated	
2019	Grabby Awards	Best Duo	Mine (Helix Studios) (Note: shared with Blake Mitchell.)	Nominated	
2019	Grabby Awards	Best Supporting Actor	Vegas Nights (Helix Studios)	Nominated	
2019	Grabby Awards	Best 3 Way	Vegas Nights (Helix Studios) (Note: shared with Corbin Colby, and Angel Rivera.)	Nominated	
2019	Pornhub Awards	Most Popular Gay Performer	Himself	Nominated	
2019	Pornhub Awards	Top Twink Performer	Himself	Won	
2020	Pornhub Awards	Most Popular Gay Male Performer	Himself	Nominated	
2020	Pornhub Awards	Top Twink Performer	Himself	Nominated	
2020	Pornhub Awards	Favorite Gay Model: Viewer's Choice	Himself	Won	
2020	Str8UpGayPorn Awards	Favorite Duo Scene	Elevator Pitch (Men.com) (Note: shared with JJ Knight.)	Won	
2021	Grabby Awards	Hottest Bottom	Himself	Won	
2021	Grabby Awards	Best Group Scene	A Tale Of Two Cock Destroyers (Men.com) (Note: shared with JJ Knight, Johnny Rapid, and Ty Mitchell.)	Won	
2022	Grabby Awards	Hottest Twink	Himself	Won	
2022	Grabby Awards	Best Threeway	Layover My Dick, Part 3 (Men.com) (Note: shared with Dillon Diaz and Adrian Hart.)	Nominated	
2022	Pornhub Awards	Most Popular Gay Male Performer	Himself	Nominated	
2022	Pornhub Awards	Top Twink Performer	Himself	Nominated	
2022	Pornhub Awards	Favorite Gay Model	Himself	Nominated	
2023	Grabby Awards	Hottest Twink	Himself	Won	
2023	GayVN Awards	Favorite Twink	Himself	Won	
2024	Pornhub Awards	Top Twink Performer	Himself	Nominated	
2024	Pornhub Awards	Favorite Gay Model: Viewer's Choice	Himself	Nominated	
2024	GayVN Awards	Best Fetish Scene	Self-Sucking Twink Is Packing Large (Men.com) (Note: shared with Spikey Dee.)	Won	
2024	GayVN Awards	Best Featurette	Accidental Pornstar (Men.com) (Note: shared with Colton Reece.)	Nominated	
2024	GayVN Awards	Performer of the Year	Himself	Nominated	
2025	GayVN Awards	Best Oral Scene	Joey's Hungry Bukkake (Men.com) (Note: shared with Spikey Dee, Greg Dixxon, Kane Fox, Jake Preston, Clark Reid and Alpha Wolfe.)	Nominated	
2025	GayVN Awards	Best Three-Way Sex Scene	Good Rubber, Part 3 (Men.com) (Note: shared with Dom King and Reese Rideout.)	Nominated	
2025	GayVN Awards	Performer of the Year	Himself	Nominated	
2025	Pornhub Awards	Top Twink Performer	Himself	Nominated	
2026	GayVN Awards	Best Three-Way Sex Scene	Ready or Nut (Men.com) (Note: shared with Finn August and Jake Preston.)	Nominated	

== Listicles ==
Name of publisher, year(s) listed, name of listicle, and placement result
Publication	Year	Title	Rank	Ref.
Grindr	2025	Pornstar of the Year	1st	
Pornhub	2018	Most Searched Gay Pornstars	8th	
Pornhub	2019	Most Searched Gay Pornstars	4th	
Pornhub	2019	Pornstars Searched More Often by Woman Compared to Men	7th	
Pornhub	2021	Most Viewed Performers	2nd	
Pornhub	2023	Most Viewed Performers	2nd	
Pornhub	2024	Most Viewed Performers	7th	
Pornhub	2025	Most Viewed Performers	16th	
Pornhub	2025	Most Viewed Performers by Gay Visitors (Pride Month)	2nd	
Pornhub	2025	Most Viewed Performers by Gay Visitors in the United Kingdom (Pride Month)	4th	
Pornhub	2025	Most Viewed Performers by Gay Visitors in Italy (Pride Month)	4th	
Pornhub	2025	Most Viewed Performers by Gay Visitors in Germany (Pride Month)	4th	
Str8UpGayPorn	2023	Top Best Gay Porn Stars	5th	
Str8UpGayPorn	2024	Top Best Gay Porn Stars	Listed	
Str8UpGayPorn	2018	The Best Gay Porn Scenes	Listed	
Str8UpGayPorn	2022	The Best Gay Porn Scenes	6th	
Str8UpGayPorn	2023	The Best Gay Porn Scenes	8th	
Str8UpGayPorn	2017	The Top Gay Porn Cum Facials	5th	
Str8UpGayPorn	2021	The Top Gay Porn News Stories	1st	
Str8UpGayPorn	2023	The Top Gay Porn News Stories	19th	
Str8UpGayPorn	2024	The Top Gay Porn News Stories	6th	
Str8UpGayPorn	2017	Most Searched-For Gay Porn Stars	32nd	
Str8UpGayPorn	2018	Most Searched-For Gay Porn Stars	23rd	
Str8UpGayPorn	2021	Most Searched-For Gay Porn Stars	1st	
Str8UpGayPorn	2022	Most Searched-For Gay Porn Stars	9th	
Str8UpGayPorn	2023	Most Searched-For Gay Porn Stars	20th	
Str8UpGayPorn	2024	Most Searched-For Gay Porn Stars	19th	
