= X-Rated: NYC =

- Genre: Reality; Docuseries; LGBTQ
- Directed by: Topher Cusumano; Artie Davis
- Starring: Boomer Banks; Dante Colle; Joey Mills; Max Konnor; Angel Rivera
- Country of origin: Canada
- Original language: English
- No. of seasons: 3
- No. of episodes: 18

Production
- Executive producers: Topher Cusumano; Artie Davis
- Production location: New York City
- Cinematography: Ryan DeVita; Adam Finmann
- Editors: Kevin Philip; Jason C. Stewart
- Running time: 18–24 minutes
- Production company: DaddyTV

Original release
- Network: OUTtv
- Release: September 26, 2022 – present

Related
- X-Rated: LA

X-Rated: NYC is a Canadian reality television series, which premiered on OUTtv in 2022. It was created by the production company DaddyTV and follows the personal and professional lives of four male adult entertainers of gay pornography in New York City.

The series has aired three seasons as of 2024 and has spawned a spin-off, X-Rated: LA.

== Synopsis ==
The series documents the lives of adult film actors Boomer Banks, Dante Colle, Joey Mills, and Max Konnor as they navigate careers in the adult entertainment industry alongside their personal relationships and public identities in New York City.

Beginning in the third season, Dante Colle departed the series to star in the spin-off X-Rated: LA, and Angel Rivera joined the cast as a main cast member.

== Cast ==
=== Main ===
Name	Seasons		
Name	1	2	3
Main
Boomer Banks	Main		
Dante Colle	Main		—N/a
Joey Mills	Main		
Max Konnor	Main		
Angel Rivera	Guest	Recurring	Main

- Boomer Banks — American-Mexican gay pornographic film actor, fashion designer and DJ.
- Dante Colle — American gay pornographic film actor (seasons 1–2).
- Joey Mills — American gay pornographic film actor and social media personality.
- Max Konnor — American gay pornographic film actor and webcam model.
- Angel Rivera — gay pornographic film actor and model (seasons 3), previously guest/recurring (seasons 1–2).

== Episodes ==
Season	Episodes	Originally released	
Season	Episodes	First released	Last released
1	6	September 26, 2022	November 1, 2022
2	6	October 3, 2023	November 17, 2023
3	6	September 3, 2024	October 8, 2024

=== Season 1 (2022) ===
No. overall	No. in season	Title	Original release date
1	1	"Charity Brawl"	September 26, 2022
2	2	"Four Dildos, Two Faces"	September 27, 2022
3	3	"Twink No More"	October 10, 2022
4	4	"Blow Me (A Kiss)"	October 24, 2022
5	5	"Can't Stand The Heat; Get Outta Hell's Kitchen"	October 31, 2022
6	6	"Fights & Fleshjacks"	November 1, 2022

=== Season 2 (2023) ===
No. overall	No. in season	Title	Original release date
7	1	"Q&A Chaos"	October 3, 2023
8	2	"The Messy Bottoms Coalition"	October 10, 2023
9	3	"Meet & Greet Mayhem"	October 23, 2023
10	4	"Screaming & Creaming"	October 24, 2023
11	5	"Go-Go Bye Bye"	November 7, 2023
12	6	"The Talking Fleshjack"	November 17, 2023

=== Season 3 (2024) ===
No. overall	No. in season	Title	Original release date
13	1	"Angels & Demon Twinks"	September 3, 2024
14	2	"Two In The Pink Lightning"	September 10, 2024
15	3	"Bestie Brawl"	September 17, 2024
16	4	"Dressing for Drama"	September 24, 2024
17	5	"The Angry Orgy"	October 4, 2024
18	6	"The Fashion Of Friendship"	October 8, 2024

== Production and release ==
The first season consists of six episodes and premiered on September 26, 2022. In October 2022, the series was renewed for two additional seasons. The second and third seasons premiered in October 2023 and September 2024, respectively.

=== Spin-off ===
A spin-off series, X-Rated: LA, premiered in 2024 and focuses on cast members based in Los Angeles.

== See also ==
- List of male actors in gay pornographic films
- List of programs broadcast by OUTtv
