= Seth Peterson (pornographic film actor) =

American gay pornographic actor

- Born: Adam Daniel Aguirre; August 27, 1997; Torrance, California, U.S.
- Died: March 19, 2026 (aged 28); Los Angeles
- Years active: 2020–2026
- Height: 5 ft 6 in (168 cm)

Seth Peterson (born Adam Daniel Aguirre; August 28, 1997 – March 19, 2026) was an American gay pornographic film actor. He rose to prominence through his projects with Helix Studios, and became a well-known figure in the gay adult film industry, earning multiple nominations.

== Early life and education ==
Adam Aguirre was born in Torrance and grew up in Redondo Beach, California. His father was a firefighter and his mother a former dental hygienist and real estate broker. Adam was the eldest of three brothers. He was half Mexican and half Caucasian (with French, Scottish and Irish ancestry).

He came out to his family when he was 15 years old, a sophomore in South High School (Torrance, California). In 2019, he graduated from University of California, Riverside with a Bachelor of Science in neuroscience.

== Career ==
While Adam considered his neuroscience degree to be his "biggest achievement", after graduating he didn't want to work in that field. He was interested in working in the adult film industry, but his boyfriend at the time wouldn't allow it. After they split, he applied to Helix Studios and was selected.

In 2020, he made his gay porn debut with a solo scene for Helix. The following year, he won the fan-voted GayVN Award for Hottest Newcomer. He was a versatile performer, and became especially popular in group scenes and bareback productions of Helix Studios. He worked as a Helix exclusive for four years, and starting in 2024 began working with other studios like Falcon | NakedSword, Next Door Studios / ASGmax, and Men.com. Due to his popularity, Falcon | Naked Sword released The Best of Seth Peterson Bareback (2025), a compilation showcasing his best bareback performances.

His looks had been compared with Tom Cruise and Taylor Lautner in the media and among his fans.

== Awards and nominations ==
Year	Award	Nomination	Work	Result	Ref.
2021	GayVN Awards	Hottest Newcomer (fan-voted category)		Won	
2021	GayVN Awards	Best Newcomer		Nominated	
2021	GayVN Awards	Best Three-Way Sex Scene	Happy Campers (with Josh Brady, Kane Fox), Helix	Nominated	
2021	GayVN Awards	Favorite Group Scene	Happy Campers (with Josh Brady, Kane Fox), Helix	Nominated	
2022	GayVN Awards			Nominated	
2022	GayVN Awards	Best Supporting Actor	Stealing Hearts, Helix	Nominated	
2022	GayVN Awards	Best Group Sex Scene	Helix Academy Wrestling: Chapter 6 (with Kane Fox, Jacob Hansen, Garrett Kinsley, Dallas Preston, Levi Rhodes, Travis Stevens), Helix	Nominated	
2022	Cybersocket Awards	Twink of the Year		Nominated	
2022	Str8UpGayPorn Awards	Twink of the Year		Nominated	
2023	GayVN Awards	Best Actor	Unraveled, Helix	Nominated	
2023	GayVN Awards	Best Actor – Featurette	Just Called to Say I'm Sorry, Helix	Nominated	
2023	GayVN Awards	Best Duo Sex Scene	Unraveled (with Kai Taylor), Helix	Nominated	
2023	GayVN Awards	Best Group Sex Scene	Wet 2: Heatwave (with Noah Bentley, Josh Brady, Silas Brooks, Garrett Kinsley, Chase Williams), Helix	Nominated	
2023	GayVN Awards	Performer of the Year		Nominated	
2023	Grabby Awards	Performer of the Year		Nominated	
2023	Grabby Awards	Best Versatile Performer		Nominated	
2023	Grabby Awards	Best Actor	Unraveled, Helix	Nominated	
2023	Grabby Awards	Best Group Scene	Wet 2: Heatwave (with Noah Bentley, Josh Brady, Silas Brooks, Garrett Kinsley, Chase Williams), Helix	Nominated	
2024	GayVN Awards	Best Three-Way Sex Scene	Twink Spitroast (with Kai Taylor, Chase Williams), Helix	Nominated	
2025	Grabby Awards	Hottest Twink		Nominated	
2026	GayVN Awards	Best Group Sex Scene	Spain in the Ass (with John Brachalli, Alex Brand, Damon Heart, Justin Jett, Jolian, Jacob Lord, Roque Rems, Dean Young), Naked Sword Originals	Nominated	
2026	GayVN Awards	Best Group Sex Scene	To the Nines (with Grant Ducati, Derek Kage, Allen King, Drew Valentino), Falcon / MenAtPlay	Nominated	

== Personal life ==
Seth's hobbies were surfing, skating, sailing, swimming, spearfishing, reading, and playing the piano. He could play an entire Beethoven Sonata which is about an hour long.

Seth dated fellow porn star Aiden Garcia in 2022.

Seth was engaged to porn star Cyrus Stark, with whom he had frequently collaborated in adult productions beginning in 2025.

== Death ==
On March 21, 2026, Kobe Marsh— who works in adult entertainment under the name Cyrus Stark— announced his fiance Seth's death through a post on Peterson's X (formerly Twitter) account. Seth died on March 19, 2026; he was 28 years old. He was reported to have died in his Los Angeles home, but the cause of death was not disclosed.

Seth alias Adam's mother told TMZ that he had been staying alone at a short-term rental home in Portland, Oregon, and his partner called to tell her that Adam had not been responding to phone calls in the past few days. She called Portland Police to request a welfare check, and they responded to Adam's place where they discovered the body of a deceased male. Police officers didn't confirm the individual's identity, but Adam’s mother believed it was her son. She travelled to Portland and said that she discovered, what she believed to be, drug paraphernalia at the rental property.
