= Flava Works =

American pornographic media company

Flava Works, Inc.
- Company type: Private
- Industry: Gay pornography
- Founded: 1999
- Headquarters: Miami, Florida, United States
- Products: Pornographic films, magazines, and Internet services
- Website: http://www.flavaworks.com

Flava Works, Inc. is an independent company that produces gay media featuring black and Latino men. Its headquarters are in Miami, Florida, with a satellite office in Chicago, Illinois.

== Overview ==
Flava Works was founded in 1999 and is owned and operated by CEO Phillip Bleicher. It began with its "CocoBoyz" website showcasing African-American men in nude and erotic photos and videos. In 2000, Flava Works started "Thugboy", and a year later expanded with the creation of the "CocoDorm". Flava Works moved its operations to Miami, Florida, in 2006 and continues to operate a satellite office in Chicago, Illinois. Flava Works' titles are available in Europe through a distribution partnership with XY Studios. In July/August 2008, FlavaWorks Cocodorm signed its first white male model, named Snowflake, to sign a five-year modeling contract to be featured on camera as their first white adult entertainment model and in January 2009, Flava Works announced its production and distribution partnership with RocaFellaz Entertainment. In April 2009, Flavaworks announced a distribution partnership with Black Rayne Productions. In May 2009, Flava Works signed its first white exclusive model.

== Products and services ==
Flava Works operates several websites offering pornographic images and videos to its patrons including Cocodorm.com, PapiCock.com, ThugBoy.com, CocoBoyz.com, and FlavaMen.com. Thugsforsex.com is an online dating portal for black and Latin men. It has a chat room with video chat capabilities to its users. The CocoDorm is a live, interactive residence where models are hired to live together in a dorm-like environment. The Miami Herald described the operation as follows: "CocoDorm offers its young, muscular males $1,200 a month along with free room and board while requiring they masturbate and have group sex in front of [web] cameras." Flava Works produces a quarterly magazine, FlavaMen, which showcases the Flava Works models and contains editorials from contributing writers.

== Blatino Awards ==
In May 2009, Flava Works announced that it was launching the FlavaMen Blatino Awards, which will honor ethnic clubs, adult performers, and websites in a variety of categories.

== The Chicago controversy ==
In 2006, a report surfaced from the Chicago Department of Public Health, which alleged that there was a high level of sexually transmitted diseases, including HIV, among the models of the Cocodorm. Allegations were also made that the CocoDorm models were engaging in bareback sex. Flava Works denied the accusations contained in the report.

== The "House Next Door" controversy and its legal resolution ==
On May 8, 2007, NBC 6 aired a news investigation entitled "The House Next Door".

The investigation surfaced when neighbors and zoning authorities were sent anonymous printed copies of webpages, a DVD of a sex show and of a fight that happened at the dorm, and photos of the red brick home.

In the documentary, models were shown half-dressed behind windows, and these images were juxtaposed with those of children playing in the street and unsuspecting neighbors being interviewed. The Miami Department of Code Enforcement visited the residence on May 8, 2007, and imposed five citations:

1. Illegal rooming house. Flava Works denied these allegations, on the grounds that the company was not charging any of its models for rent while they were residents in the CocoDorm.
2. Adult entertainment not permitted in C-1 zone property. Flava Works responded stating that they do not run an "Adult Entertainment" service on the property.
3. Failure to Maintain Exterior of Commercial or Residential Property. Flava Works maintained in response that the property's landscape was well maintained and cleaned.
4. Failure to maintain lot in safe, clean condition; not allowing accumulation of debris, trash or dense growth of grass. Flava Works maintained that the yard was in good condition.
5. Illegally operating a business in a residential zone. Flava Works responded that the company was not operating a business at the property; all business activities and Internet servers are located off-site.

On August 13, 2007, and after "three acrimonious public meetings … in sessions going past midnight, Miami's Code Enforcement Board ruled that Flava Works was "illegally running an adult entertainment business out of a single-family home … and ordered that those operations cease.

However, Flava Works filed a lawsuit against the City of Miami in response to the verdict, invoking First Amendment rights and arguing that it was not running an adult-oriented business out of the "House Next Door". Flava Works also argued that business transactions do not take place in a residential neighborhood in Miami, but rather in virtual space. The case attracted some interest in legal circles.

Ruling on the case was made in January 2009, when Judge Marcia G. Cooke of the United States District Court, Southern District of Florida, Miami Division, ruled in favor of Flava Works. She based her judgment on the precedent of a very similar case involving a heterosexual porn site, "Voyeur Dorm", operating webcams in a Tampa, Florida, residence. The judge ruling on the Voyeur Dorm case came to the conclusion that the residence provided no "offer[ing] [of adult entertainment] to members of the public". The offering occurs when the videotaped images are dispersed over the internet and into the public eye for consumption.

Cooke agreed, writing on the CocoDorm: "Because the public offering by Flava Works, Inc. occurs via cocodorm.com in cyberspace, and not in a particular geographic location, the City of Miami zoning ordinance cannot be applied to the 503 residence. Furthermore,

the servers necessary to transmit the live and recorded video feeds to subscribers are not housed in either the 503 residence or the North Miami avenue business office. Here, although the performers are paid to be at the residence and captured on video, the processing and transmitting of the resulting images is done at a different location; a location not at issue in this case.

Cooke's decision was featured on NBC 6 on February 3, 2009, in a story entitled, "Porn House Can Stay". The report indicated that the City of Miami's intended to appeal the decision.

The city appealed, and in June 2010 the Eleventh Circuit Court of Appeals ruled that regardless of whether the CocoDorm was an adult entertainment establishment, it was a business operation, and Miami zoning ordinances forbid operating a business in a residential zone. The court distinguished the Voyeur Dorm case by pointing out that the latter involved a Tampa ordinance against adult entertainment establishments, not business operations in general.

== Flava Works Inc. v. Gunter ==
In 2010 Flava Works filed a lawsuit against Gunter who was operating myVidster.com claiming copyright and trademark infringement. This case became an important case in copyright law as it shows the boundaries of the safe harbour provisions in the Digital Millennium Copyright Act. The case resulted in a preliminary injunction in favor of Flava Works. The decision was reversed by The United States Seventh Circuit Court of Appeals on August 2, 2012.

== Awards and recognition ==
- 2010 XBIZ Award Nominee - Gay Studio of the Year

== See also ==
- Internet pornography
- List of male performers in gay porn films
- List of gay pornographic movie studios
- Pornography
