= Helix Studios =

American gay pornographic film studio

- Type: Private
- Industry: Gay pornography
- Founded: 2002 in Fort Lauderdale, Florida, U.S.
- Founder: Keith Miller
- Headquarters: Las Vegas, Nevada, U.S.
- Website: helixstudios.com

Helix Studios is an American gay pornographic film studio. Founded in 2002 by Keith Miller and based in Las Vegas, Nevada, it primarily features twink performers. The company began in Fort Lauderdale, Florida, as a maker of niche spanking films before transitioning to mainstream hardcore pornography in 2004 and relocating to San Francisco, California, in 2006. Helix has primarily operated on a subscription business model since its inception and has released films on DVD, video on demand, a Roku channel, pay-per-view, and its website.

== History ==
Helix Studios was founded in 2002 by Keith Miller, who had previously co-founded the billing service iBill, which was acquired in 2000. Since starting and as of 2022, it uses a monthly subscription business model, which allows subscribers to download or stream the studio's films. The studio's first release, First Time Spankings, was an erotic spanking movie released in 2002 under the label SpankThis. Helix partnered with distributor Marina Pacific in 2003 and transitioned from niche fetish content to hardcore pornography films in 2004. At the 2005 GayVN Awards, Helix was nominated for Best Specialty Release (18–23) for its movie Twinkalicious, winning the award at the following year's ceremony for Twink Juice. Helix Cash, its affiliate program, was launched in January 2006. In September 2006, Helix Studios moved from Fort Lauderdale, Florida, to San Diego, California. AVN called Helix "one of the leaders in its specialties" of twink-focused videos the following month, by which point it had production lines SpankThis—which focused on erotic spanking films—and 8Teenboy, which had been purchased by Miller from a local photographer and focused on hardcore videos featuring "barely legal" twink performers. It opened an online store, Mankind Video, which contained its entire film catalog, in September 2007. Helix Studios released a mobile version of its website using WebKit in 2010.

Helix released 8TeenBoy Boost, an herbal aphrodisiac, in March 2011. In June 2011, it partnered with AEBN to release over 200 of its films on video on demand, it and launched a channel on Roku in August 2012. By then, in addition to SpankThis and 8TeenBoy, it also had HotStuds, Fratboy, Latin Studs, and Raw Lads production lines, which were eventually all merged into Helix Studios as a result of the Great Recession. A parody of the music video for the Robin Thicke song "Blurred Lines" by Helix Studios was released in July 2013 and became popular online. Helix signed a licensing deal with the gay pornographic film studios BoyCrush and Staxus to release their films to subscribers in January 2015 and purchased the catalogs of gay pornographic film studios PZP Productions and Puppy Productions in March 2015. Helix Studios was nominated for the XBIZ Award for Gay Studio of the Year in 2017. In April 2017, Helix launched 8TeenBoy.com, a website for their 8TeenBoy production line, which was headed by Max Carter, a former performer for Helix. Also in 2017, Helix relocated to Las Vegas, Nevada, and closed its San Francisco studio in January 2018.

Las Vegas-based filmmaker Heidi Moore became an editor and writer for Helix Studios in 2018 and made the studio's films more narrative-based, with many of the films' nonsexual scenes being uploaded to Amazon Prime Video and its YouTube channel; it earned 150,000 subscribers on YouTube by 2022. By 2018, Helix Studios and its performers had devoted female followings on social media. 13 Red Media, an LGBTQ media company founded by Miller, began releasing the Rise Up series of young adult novels based on Helix Studios actors, including His Own Way Out, based on Blake Mitchell, Twink, based on Kyle Ross, and Electric Soul, based on Joey Mills. Miller was inducted into the GayVN Hall of Fame in 2019 for his work with Helix. In 2020, Helix Studios won the GayVN Award for Best Feature for its film Vegas Nights. Helix Studios Latin America was created in 2021, and, in 2022, Helix launched Helix Studios Europe and a pay-per-view service, which allowed non-subscribers to purchase individual films. As of 2022, Helix Studios is based in Las Vegas.

== Performers ==
- Kyle Ross became a popular pornographic actor for Helix Studios after signing with them in 2012. He became an administrator for Helix and got engaged to fellow former Helix actor Max Carter in December 2017; the couple were called the "First Couple of Helix Studios" by Kevin O'Keeffe of Into for being "the longest-lasting, most visible faces" of the Helix brand. Ross died in a car crash in Florida in May 2023 at 29 years old. His identical twin brother, Kris Ross, had signed with Helix after him in 2012.
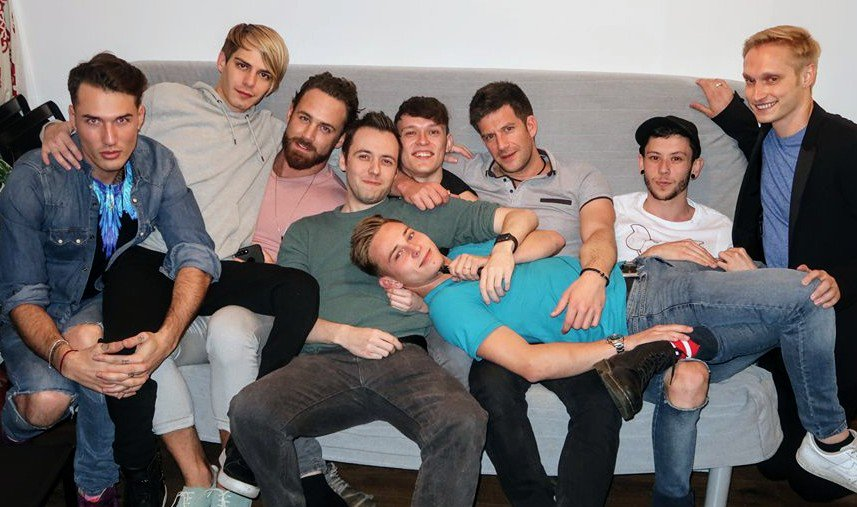
  French Twinks team meeting Max Carter (rightmost) and Kyle Ross (2nd from left) in London for Prowlers European Gay Porn Awards 2018
- The Vine star Bryan Silva, who went viral on the platform in 2014, had worked for Helix Studios.
- Zac Stevens, a gay pornographic actor who worked with Helix, died in November 2015 at age 25.
- The 2017 short film Flower, directed by Matt Lambert, starred Joey Mills, Sean Ford, Blake Mitchell, Landon Vega, and Corbin Colby, five gay pornographic actors from Helix.
- Angel Rivera signed an exclusive contract with Helix at the beginning of his porn career.
- Helix Studios actor Shane Cook announced in 2018 that he had been diagnosed with stage 2 Hodgkin lymphoma.
- A video featuring Justin O'Brien, who had previously performed for Helix Studios under the name Dustin Gold, shouting racial slurs at a Black sanitation worker from his car and arguing with a pedestrian in New York City went viral in July 2020. Helix Studios responded on Twitter, writing that he had been fired and had not worked for the company since 2014 but would not be employed by them going forward.
- Alex Riley began working exclusively with Helix Studios in 2019 and won the GayVN Award for Best Newcomer in 2020; the following year Helix Studios announced that Riley died at age 22.
- Casey Tanner, who had been a popular actor for Helix Studios in the mid-2010s before retiring in 2017, died at age 28 in April 2023.
- Lane Rogers, who had been known as Blake Mitchell when he worked as an actor for Helix Studios, died at age 31 in December 15, 2025.
- Seth Peterson, an actor who worked as a Helix exclusive from 2020 to 2024 and who died at age 28 in March 2026.
