= Voyeur Dorm, L.C. v. City of Tampa =

Florida court case

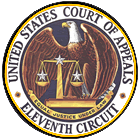
- Court: United States Court of Appeals for the Eleventh Circuit
- Full case name: Voyeur Dorm, L.C., et al v. City of Tampa, FL
- Decided: September 21, 2001
- Citation: 265 F.3d 1232

Case history
- Prior history: 121 F. Supp. 2d 1373 (M.D. Fla. 2000)

Court membership
- Judges sitting: Gerald Bard Tjoflat, Joel Fredrick Dubina, John M. Duhe, Jr.

Case opinions
- Majority: Dubina, joined by a unanimous court

Laws applied
- Tampa City Code

Voyeur Dorm, L.C. v. City of Tampa, 265 F.3d 1232 (11th Cir. 2001), was a case decided by the U.S. Court of Appeals for the Eleventh Circuit, in which the court decided whether an adult-oriented website called Voyeur Dorm could be defined as "adult entertainment establishment" under the city's zoning codes. The circuit court was unanimous in its decision that the zoning codes did not apply to an online-only business.

== Background ==
Voyeur Dorm, located at 2312 West Farwell Drive in Tampa, Florida, was an online company operating a website that allowed subscribers to watch the lives of the residents 24 hours per day for a $34.95 monthly subscription. The women employed by Voyeur Dorm signed contracts stating that they were employees on a "stage and filming location". Subscribers could also pay an additional $16.00 each month to chat with the women. From August 1998 to June 2000, Voyeur Dorm generated $3,166,551.35 from subscriptions and sales. Upon learning that local law enforcement officers were investigating the business in 1998, Voyeur Dorm wrote to Tampa's Zoning Coordinator to inquire about whether the city's zoning codes applied to the activities at 2312 West Farwell Drive.

Tampa's zoning codes for adult-oriented businesses were based on the secondary effects doctrine, or the belief that such businesses would attract undesirable customers and cause quality of life in the surrounding neighborhood to deteriorate. Hence, adult-oriented businesses were confined to pre-approved districts of the city. Voyeur Dorm contended that the house on West Farwell Drive did not qualify as a traditional adult-oriented business because it did not welcome customers from the general public onto the property. Tampa's Zoning Coordinator disagreed, finding that Voyeur Dorm was operating an adult-oriented business in an unapproved location, and ordering the business to vacate the property immediately or be shut down.

Voyeur Dorm appealed the zoning decision to District Court for the Middle District of Florida, which upheld Tampa's order for Voyeur Dorm to vacate the building. That decision was appealed to the U.S. Court of Appeals for the Eleventh Circuit.

== Opinion ==
The circuit court reversed the lower court decision, and found that Voyeur Dorm could not be defined as an adult-oriented business under Tampa's zoning codes, which had been written with physical businesses in mind. Judge Fredrick Dubina wrote that "the offering occurs when the videotaped images are dispersed over the Internet and into the public eye for consumption. The City Code cannot be applied to a location that does not, itself, offer adult entertainment to the public."

While several U.S. Supreme Court precedents had upheld efforts by cities to improve residential neighborhoods via zoning codes that prohibited adult-oriented businesses, the 11th Circuit found that those efforts had been supported by evidence of secondary effects. On the other hand, as an online-only business, Voyeur Dorm did not attract disreputable characters to the neighborhood around the building where the online entertainment originated.

Lawyers on both sides in the case noted that free speech issues, which may be relevant as Voyeur Dorm was a content creator, were not being argued, and that the ruling should be about the city's zoning codes specifically. Tampa appealed the circuit court ruling to the U.S. Supreme Court, but the high court declined to hear the case.
