= Jonathan De Falco =

Belgian footballer and pornographic actor (born 1984)

Jonathan De Falco (born 8 October 1984) is a Belgian former footballer who played as a defender for KRC Mechelen. After his retirement, he began a career as a gay pornographic actor under the name Stany Falcone.

== Career ==
In 2007, de Falco signed for Belgian second-tier side Deinze. At the age of 26, he retired from professional football due to injury. After that, he worked as a gay pornography actor under the pseudonym Stany Falcone.
