= Ulrike's Brain =

- Directed by: Bruce LaBruce
- Written by: Bruce LaBruce
- Starring: Susanne Sachsse
- Release date: 11 February 2017 (Berlin)
- Running time: 55 minutes
- Countries: Germany; Canada
- Language: English

Ulrike's Brain is a 2017 German-Canadian drama film directed by Bruce LaBruce. It was screened in the Forum section at the 67th Berlin International Film Festival.

The film, described by LaBruce in advance interviews as a sequel of sorts to his early film The Raspberry Reich, stars Susanne Sachsse as Julia Feifer, an academic who possesses and can communicate with the brain of German Red Army Faction radical Ulrike Meinhof. She is seeking to transplant the brain into a new body so that she can resurrect Meinhof and revive her goal of socialist and feminist revolution, but her plans are complicated when her archrival Detlev Schlesinger, an extreme right-wing ideologue, arrives with identical plans for the surviving brain of German neo-Nazi leader Michael Kühnen.

The film, a spoof of the 1960s B-movie subgenre of mad scientists preserving human brains, is thematically linked with LaBruce's feature film The Misandrists, which premiered at Berlin's Panorama program in the same week. Although both films were made in Germany, Ulrike's Brain received some production funding from the Canada Council for the Arts while The Misandrists did not.
