= Davey Wavey =

American YouTuber

- Born: David Perry Jacques; July 12, 1983 (age 42); Woonsocket, Rhode Island, U.S.
- Occupation: YouTuber

YouTube information
- Channel: wickydkewl
- Years active: 2006–present
- Genres: LGBT; sex; relationships
- Subscribers: 1.75 million
- Views: 881.9 million
- Last updated: April 8, 2026

David Perry Jacques (born July 12, 1983), known as Davey Wavey, is an American YouTuber who covers LGBT topics related to sex, relationships, and coming out. His YouTube channel has over a million subscribers. Wavey is also the creator of Himeros.tv, an erotic video platform.

== Early life ==
Davey Wavey grew up in Woonsocket, Rhode Island, in a conservative Catholic family. He came out as gay when he was 16 and abandoned the Catholic faith while attending a Catholic high school. He has lived in Rhode Island, New York City, Washington, D.C., Buenos Aires, Toronto, and West Hollywood, California.

== Career ==
Wavey's first YouTube video was on June 21, 2007. He became well known after his 2007 video, "I Caught My Hot Neighbor Masturbating! (with sound)" went viral, reaching over two million views. His channel, wickydkewl, has over a million subscribers from 150 countries. Wavey talks about love and sex, often appearing shirtless. Wavey began by making videos that addressed misconceptions about gay people, "Like that all gay men are hairdressers or sexually promiscuous or that we're weak", but now describes his videos as "focused on the misconceptions, stigmas, and issues within our LGBT community. Those include slut-shaming, a lack of respect for elder-gays, fem-shaming, HIV, and body issues, to name a few."

In 2017, Wavey created Himeros.tv, a porn platform that "enhances gay and bisexual men's experience of sex and sexuality through connection, exploration, and pleasure". Wavey described Himeros.tv to The Advocate saying, "We don't market it as educational porn or porn that's good for you, but it kind of is. It's porn, that when you watch it, you see either a technique that's being demonstrated or a concept that you feel like you can apply to your life. As gay men in a vacuum of sex education, we learned about sex by doing what? Watching porn." Himeros.tv creates videos with sex coaches, sexologists, tantric coaches, and adult film stars.

Wavey also had a cameo as a non-nude extra in Justice League : A Gay XXX Parody (2018), Men.com's gay porn parody of Justice League.
