= French Twinks =

Gay pornographic film studio

- Type: Pornography
- Industry: Gay pornography
- Genre: Twinks
- Founded: 2013
- Founder: Antoine Lebel
- Headquarters: Geneva, Switzerland
- Products: Pornographic films and internet pornography
- Brands: Friends & Buddies GaySexChallenge
- Parent: VivaLead SA
- Website: www.french-twinks.com/en/

French Twinks is a France-based gay pornographic studio founded by director and producer Antoine Lebel in 2013.

== Overview ==
French Twinks is a Swiss Owned company, operating under the parent company VivaLead SA. Since its launch in 2013 it has grown to the largest French based Twink porn studios, focusing on young sporty guys in France. The studios have been nominated for and won multiple awards for both its porn scenes and more recently its direction and production.

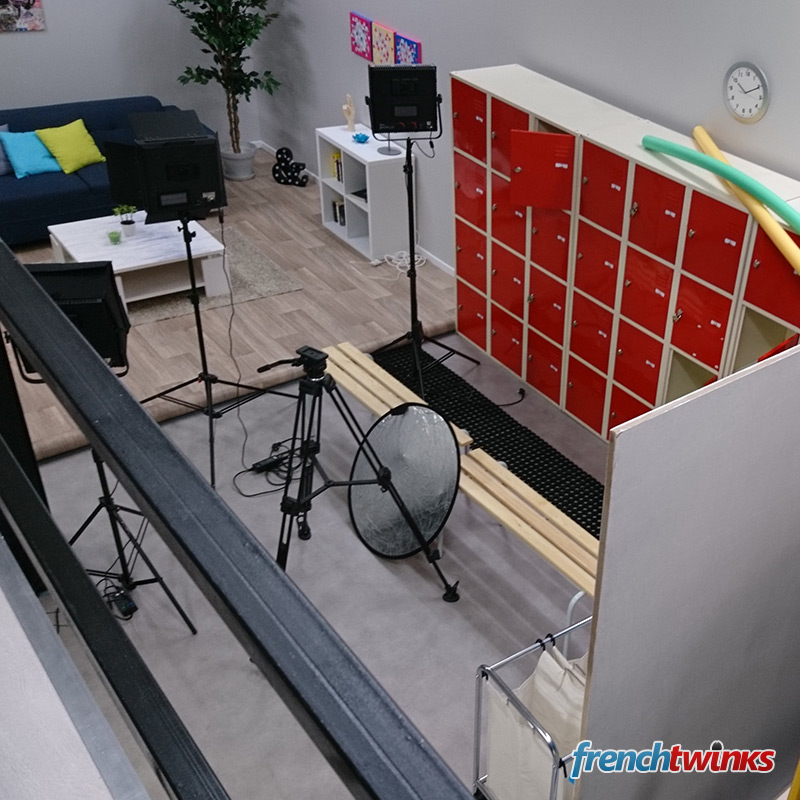
French Twinks Studios in French Riviera

When describing his studios, Antoine Lebel; creator, says "French Twinks Studios is a Euro twink niche gay porn site dedicated to producing exclusive quality gay porn productions."

== History ==
French Twinks was founded in 2013 by Antoine Lebel. It has grown to become one of the largest gay porn film studios in France. In 2013 the site launched with an explicit web series called "Apprentice Porn-stars", following the lives of real gay porn stars in training, shot in a "reality TV show" style.

It was in 2013 during "Apprentice Porn-stars" that a young model Theo Ford was found and trained by French Twinks, Theo went on to become one of the word leading male hunk porn stars and has won many awards as well as giving many interviews in his career, always citing French Twinks as here he started off his career. Anthony Cruz is another model who after starting at French Twinks went on to start his own porn studios as well as w being a porn star for many other studios.

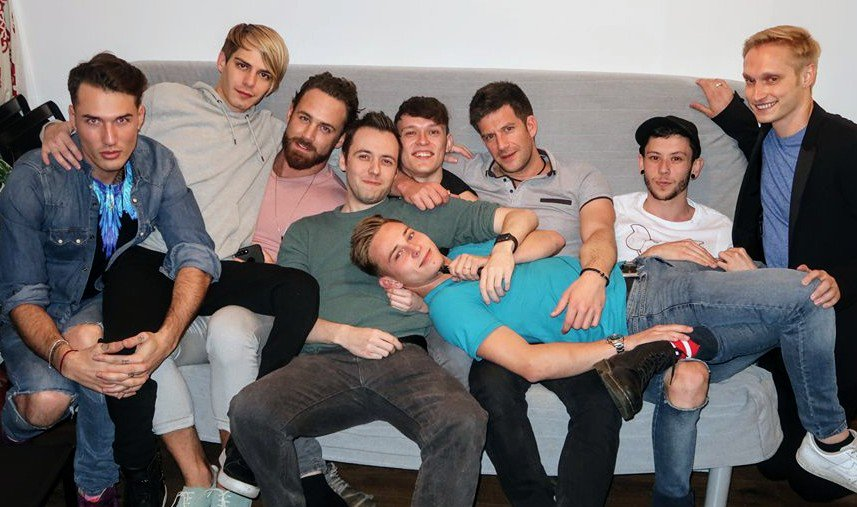
French Twinks Team Meet with Helix Studios' models in London for Prowlers European Gay Porn Awards 2018

In 2015 French Twinks crew took porn star Camille Kenzo to the United States of America for a planned "US Tour" where French Twinks collaborated with other gay pornographic studio's Dominic Ford & Helix Studios, producing a range of scenes released by both companies.

In April 2016 French Twinks Shot its first Virtual Reality scenes using an external company to manage the scenes sales

In 2016 French Twinks starts live streaming its behind the scenes footage of its porn shoots on online sex cam site Cam4.

In 2016 French Twinks uses the anti-piracy company Porn Guardian.

On 26 May 2016 Antoine Lebel Appeared on TV program Canal+ to discuss the success of FrenchTwinks in France.

In March 2016 La Voix Dux Porno Magazine visited French Twinks Studios behind the scenes to write an article on the studios. They visited during a shoot with a guest model and noted international Porn Star Angel Cruz.

From the Period 2013–Present, French Twinks has held many fan meets with its models and held many live events in local bars in France.

On 30 November 2016, French Twinks launched a new sub-website, GaySexChallenge.com, produced by BoyMove productions, a new branch of the company.

== Baptiste Garcia: Disappearance and Death ==
On 3 October 2016 Maxent Houillon, an exclusive model who performed for the studio under the stage name "Baptiste Garcia", was reported missing to police following, not keeping an appointment with friends in "Place Francois Arago, and then not showing up for a new job he was due to start in a bar in Elne. It was reported by his boyfriend also an exclusive model at French Twinks, Chris Loan, he was last seen by his best friend and unofficial adoptive sister at 13:00 on 03/10/2016 at bus stop in "Roussillonnais". Days went by with no information; news agencies in France, Gay Porn sites all around the world, and social media took an interest spreading word as quickly as possible to as many as they could, to aid with Baptiste's discovery.

It was not until 15 October 2016 nearly 2 weeks after his disappearance that Maxent was found, and although details were never officially released a close friend of French Twinks studios posted to her blog to inform fans that he had been found safe and well.

On 12 May 2019, French Twinks announced the death of Houillon. No cause of death was given, though fellow porn star Jordan Fox tweeted "...how many young gays have to die before we react against drugs..." in his tribute to Houillon.

== Video Series lines ==
- Friends & Buddies
- Apprentice PornStars
- French Twinks
- Gay Sex Challenge

== Team ==
- Antoine Lebel - Creator / Producer - (2013–Present)
- Jerome Bondurand - Video Director / Editor - (2013 - 2016)
- Max Riviera - Assistant Director (2016–Present)
- Daniel Ryder - Marketing & Partners Manager (2014–Present)
- Benj 'Nguyen - Media Editor (2016–Present)

== Exclusive Models ==
- Abel Lacourt
- Paul Delay
- Mattèo Lavigne
- Nolan Lacroix
- Alex Tivoli
- Camille Kenzo
- Baptiste Garcia
- Chris Loan
- Robin Castel

== Awards and nominations ==
=== Awards ===
- 2015: CyberSocket Awards: Best Sex Scene - French Twinks & Helix Studios - “Two Americans for a Frenchie”
- 2015: PinkX Awards: Best French Movie - Antoine Lebel, FrenchTwinks - "Everyone Loves Fucking Camille"
- 2016: PinkX Awards: Best Director - Antoine Lebel & Jerome Bondurand - "Twinks Go Camping"

=== Nominations ===
- 2015: CyberSocket Awards: Best New Site - French Twinks
- 2015: CyberSocket Awards: Best Newcomer - Camille Kenzo, French Twinks
- 2015: CyberSocket Awards: Best Video Site - French Twinks
- 2015: CyberSocket Awards: Best European Site - French Twinks
- 2015: CyberSocket Awards: Best Niche Site - French Twinks
- 2015: PinkX Awards: Best New Cumer - Theo Ford - "Apprentice PornStars"
- 2015: PinkX Awards: Best Bottom - Camille Kenzo, FrenchTwinks - "Everyone Loves Fucking Camille"
- 2016: PinkX Awards: Best French Movie - FrenchTwinks - "Twinks Go Camping"
- 2016: PinkX Awards: Best Duo - Camille Kenzo & Theo Ford - "Camille in the USA"
