= CockyBoys =

American pornographic film studio

- Type: Private
- Industry: Gay pornography
- Founded: 2007
- Headquarters: New York City, United States
- Key people: Jake Jaxson; RJ Sebastian; Benny Morecock
- Products: Internet pornography and Pornographic films
- Website: cockyboys.com

CockyBoys is an independent New York City-based producer of gay internet pornography, managed by CEO Jake Jaxson and his two partners, RJ Sebastian and Benny Morecock. The 2012 reality television feature film Project GoGo Boy is considered the studio's breakout hit.

In 2014, CockyBoys partnered with Bruno Gmünder and published a book of erotic photography titled A Thing of Beauty leading to an international book tour.

CockyBoys has earned multiple nominations and over 80 awards, most recently Str8UpGayPorn's Best of 2020 Fan Choice Awards.

== History ==
CockyBoys was founded by Kyle Majors in 2007. Based in Los Angeles, Majors' version of the site took a voyeuristic approach focusing heavily on jocks, tattooed guys, and southern California culture. Majors was inspired by a friend's desire for, "no complicated stories, ... no lavish costumes or stupid uniforms – just cock pounding ass."

In early 2010, CockyBoys was sold to New York-based filmmaker Jake Jaxson, becoming one of only two major gay adult studios in the city's five boroughs. The site briefly went offline to undergo a complete transformation, and re-launched with a new design, full HD content, mobile device compatibility, and a streamlined sign-up process. A new roster of exclusively signed models was recruited including Mason Star, Gabriel Clark, and Tommy Defendi. The look and feel of the films also changed drastically, with more attention to cinematography and editing.

The inner-workings of the studio came to light in August 2012, when New York Magazine profiled self-taught web designer Benny Morecock and his relationship with Jake Jaxson and RJ Sebastian. The article, He & He & He, was later adapted into a play titled "Gay Sex" for a Vassar College student's senior thesis. The writer led a panel discussion with Morecock, Jaxson, and Sebastian on life, love, and their art porn movement.

In June 2013, Jaxson garnered international headlines when the New York Daily News revealed that his former business partner was Glenn Greenwald, the journalist behind the National Security Agency scandal. Additionally, CockyBoys signed a professional dancer they named Jett Black in 2013, who was subsequently expelled from the Royal Winnipeg Ballet for his work with the studio. Both Jett Black and CockyBoys became the center of an international news story when CBC News in Canada interviewed Jaxson and Black for a feature that ran online and on television about the whole scandal.

In October 2014, CockyBoys announced that two of its films were selected to screen at the 2014 Berlin Porn Film Festival: Fuck Yeah Levi Karter, a documentary about the CockyBoys star's life and fast rise to porn stardom composed entirely of footage from his own phones, computers, and cameras, and Answered Prayers: The Banker, part one of an allegorical morality play set against an ancient family feud and the follies of men. The six-part miniseries was profiled in The Village Voice with a multi-page story detailing the inspiration behind the project.

On April 3, 2015, CockyBoys appeared at the Schwules Sex Museum in Berlin during the museum's Porn That Way exhibition to present their new photo book Sixty Nine: Joyful Gay Sex. In addition, CockyBoy CEO Jake Jaxson and photographer RJ Sebastian along with models Tayte Hanson, Levi Karter and Liam Riley participated on a panel before an audience forum to discuss the "Romantic Porn" trend.

== Feature film productions & mini-series ==
CockyBoys has built a reputation for its avant-garde approach to gay sex, often incorporating mainstream genres and personal anecdotes from both the models and the filmmakers with porn. In describing Jaxson's creative impact on the adult industry, Bradford Matthews of Fleshbot wrote, "There's plenty of filmmakers that have explored pornography in independent films, but I can honestly say Jaxson is one of first pornographers I've seen successfully work in the opposite direction, exploring the art of creative filmmaking through pornography."

Partial list

- Name of the Game (2011)
- Project GoGo Boy (2012)
- The Haunting (2012–2013)
- Max & Jake's RoadStrip (2013)
- A Thing Of Beauty (2013)
- Answered Prayers (2013–2015)
- Meeting Liam (2014–2015)
- Meet The Morecocks (2013–2017)
- One Erection: The Un-Making Of A Boy Band (2016)
- Just Love (2016)
- The Stillest Hour (2016)
- Missed Connections (2017)
- A CockyBoy Is ______ (2017)
- Camp CockyBoys (2017)
- Just One Night (2017)
- Diablo In Madrid (2017) (Note: as part of It Is Not the Pornographer That Is Perverse...) directed by Bruce LaBruce
- Call Me Lucky (2017) directed by Dominic Pacifico
- Postcards From LA (2018)
- Jake Jaxson's ALL SAiNTS Chapter One (2018)
- Bruce La Bruce's Flea Pit (2018)
- Bruce La Bruce's Uber Menschen (2018)
- Bruce La Bruce's Purple Army Faction (2018)
- Love Lost & Found (2018)
- Before The Afterglow (2018)
- It's Summer At Cocky Boys (2018)
- Just Being Me (2018)
- Jake Jaxson's ALL SAiNTS Chapter Two (2018–2020)
- More Before The Afterglow (2018)
- Le Garçon Scandaleux (2019)
- A Is For Alpha (2019)
- Dim The Lights (2019)
- Hollywood & Vine (2020)
- LOCK(DOWN) But Not Out (2020)
- Jake Jaxson's ALL SAiNTS
- Chapters One & Two Director's Cut (2020)
- New Day (2020)
- Meetin Liam. (2021)

== Fan base ==
CockyBoys has a cult following of fans of many genders and sexualities. In 2013, CockyBoys was the only exclusively gay male porn producer included in a Cosmopolitan article listing the very best porn for women. Jaxson described CockyBoys' uniquely large following of female fans as "porn moms" in a 2014 interview with The Daily Telegraph.

== See also ==
- List of male performers in gay porn films
- List of gay pornographic movie studios
