= It Is Not the Homosexual Who Is Perverse, But the Society in Which He Lives =

1971 German film

- Book cover
- German: Nicht der Homosexuelle ist pervers, sondern die Situation, in der er lebt
- Directed by: Rosa von Praunheim
- Written by: Rosa von Praunheim; Martin Dannecker; Sigurd Wurl
- Produced by: Werner Kließ
- Starring: Berryt Bohlen; Bernd Feuerhelm; Ernst Kuchling
- Cinematography: Robert van Ackeren
- Edited by: Jean-Claude Piroué
- Production companies: Bavaria Film; Bavaria Atelier; Westdeutscher Rundfunk (WDR)
- Distributed by: Filmverlag der Autoren (West Germany)
- Release date: 1971 (Berlinale)
- Running time: 67 minutes
- Country: West Germany
- Language: German
- Budget: DM 250,000

It Is Not the Homosexual Who Is Perverse, But the Society in Which He Lives (German: Nicht der Homosexuelle ist pervers, sondern die Situation, in der er lebt) is a 1971 West German avant-garde film directed by Rosa von Praunheim.

The film was an emancipation call for homosexuals to organize and fight for their freedom. Triggering the modern gay rights movement in West Germany and Switzerland, and also founding great resonance internationally. The film became a media scandal because conservative homosexuals and heterosexuals alike rejected the demands for equality in all areas of life and the call for public solidarity.

The film had its world premiere at the Young Filmmakers Forum section of 1971 Berlin International Film Festival.

== Plot ==
A young man named Daniel moves to Berlin and meets Clemens. They fall in love, move in together and try to imitate a typical bourgeois marriage. After four months, they separate. Daniel moves into the villa of a rich older man. A little later, his boyfriend cheats on him with another man. Daniel realizes he was only an object of lust.

Daniel starts working in a gay café, dresses in the latest fashion and quickly adapts to the ideals of the gay subculture. He likes to spend his free time at the lido and shows off his body in a skimpy bathing suit. At night, he goes to trendy bars and becomes more and more addicted to constantly changing partners and fleeting sex adventures. After a while, he also discovers the charms of cruising in parks and public toilets, where he also notices older homosexuals being beaten up.

During a night out, Daniel ends up in a drag queen bar, looking for his latest hook-up. Here he meets Paul, who takes him to his apartment shared with several gay roommates.

The residents discuss the challenges and problems of gay life with him and make it clear that he leads a superficial life. His task as an emancipated gay man, they say, is to publicly acknowledge his gayness and be an activist, instead of just chasing fashion trends and fast, mostly anonymous sex. The group suggests that he get involved socially and politically with them, create networks and fight together with others for a fairer society in which homosexuals can develop freely and without discrimination.

The plot deals with gay emancipation, homosexual culture, and other provocative themes for its time.

== Cast ==
- Bernd Feuerhelm as Daniel
- Berryt Bohlen as Clemens
- Ernst Kuchling as Der Reiche (The Rich)
- Volker Eschke
- Michael Bolze

== Release ==
The film had its world premiere at the Young Filmmakers Forum section of 1971 Berlin International Film Festival. The US premiere took place in 1972 at the Museum of Modern Art in New York City, the British premiere in the same year at the National Film Theatre in London.

== Reception ==
The film was attacked both by German conservatives, progressives and gay activists. Despite not being a very good film, according to Samuel Clowes Huneke, it was revolutionary by conceiving homosexuality as a political identity. The film also spawned dozens of homosexual activism groups, to the left of older homophile organizations.

"Rosa von Praunheim is one of the world's most prolific gay filmmakers. His 1970 [1971] film It's Not the Homosexual Who is Perverse, But the Society in Which He Lives (Nicht der Homosexuelle ist pervers, sondern die Situation, in der er lebt) established him as the public trailblazer for the modern gay rights movement." (Academy of Arts) "It is a personal liberation for Holger Mischwitzky [Rosa von Praunheim] - and a wake-up call for all homosexual men. [...] With this film, Rosa von Praunheim became the icon of the gay and lesbian movement in Germany almost overnight." (Deutsche Welle) "Rosa von Praunheim's film made an epoch." (Frankfurter Rundschau) "Praunheim became the spokesperson of politically active gays. Nearly all programs concerned about gay issues sought his presence." (Gay Museum) The American film critic Joe Hoeffner wrote in an article about the twelve most important queer films: "Many films have been called revolutionary, but It Is Not the Homosexual… truly earns that description. The breakout film by director and activist Rosa von Praunheim (aka Holger Mischwitzky) became a foundational text of the German gay rights movement, and its call for liberation reverberated through the history of queer cinema.“

The American LGBT activist and film historian Vito Russo wrote in a public letter to Rosa von Praunheim on the occasion of the film's upcoming US premiere: "[…] Your film deserves to be shown here in America. The gay and straight community alike here must be made aware that these things are being discussed and presented elsewhere in the world. It is only through constant exposure and expression that we can ever hope to overcome what has for so many years, for too many years, been an irrational taboo. When people spend their lives fighting for a cause in which they believe, it gives them immeasurable comfort to know that there are others fighting for freedom of expression both in their lives and in their art." (Signed February 18, 1972, kept in the MoMA Archive)
