= Stéphane Pacaud =

French computer scientist and adult media entrepreneur (born 1978)

Stéphane Pacaud (born 17 September 1978 in Creusot) is a French computer scientist known for owning pornographic websites such as XVideos and XNXX, studios like Bang Bros, magazines like Penthouse, and companies like Private Media Group. As of 2025, Pacaud owns 100% of the shares of WGCZ Holding, which holds numerous subsidiary companies within the pornography industry.

According to Challenges magazine, Pacaud's fortune is estimated at 500 million euros, placing him among the top 500 richest French people.

== Personal life ==
Little is known about Pacaud because he refused to give interviews to the press due to a lack of "trust" and "respect" for the media. He finally gave an interview to BFM TV in 2019. He reportedly lived in Manila in 2008 and around Zurich in 2012 before settling in Prague, Czech Republic, in 2009. He entered the pornographic industry in the early 2000s.

== Accusations ==
In the pornography industry and in court, Pacaud is accused of having, in his early days, illegally distributed content without the owners' consent, including films of sexual abuse committed by his crew during filming, and of leaving child pornography videos online. He is also criticized for the lack of transparency in the operations of his WGCZ group.

On July 17, 2025, the newspaper Le Monde reported that behind "a complex network of companies," his WGCZ group was the true owner of the French company Jacquie et Michel (J&M), contrary to what the company had stated at the time.

== See also ==
- WGCZ Holding
- XVideos
- XNXX
- Porn 2.0
- Penthouse Magazine
- Bang Bros
