= ECAT =

ECAT may refer to

- European Centre for Algorithmic Transparency (part of the European Commission)
- Emergency Committee for American Trade
- Escambia County Area Transit
- Energy Catalyzer (sometimes shortened to E-Cat)
- ECAT Pakistan
