= Berth Milton =

Berth Milton is the name of two Swedish pornographers:

- Berth Milton, Sr. (1926 – 2005), Swedish pornographer and businessman who founded Private
- Berth Milton, Jr. (born 1955), son of the above, majority owner of Private
