= The Uranus Experiment =

1999 pornographic science fiction film by John Millerman

- Directed by: John Millerman
- Screenplay by: John Millerman
- Starring: Sylvia Saint; Wanda Curtis; Bettina Campbell
- Music by: Liam Howlett; Robert Del Naja
- Production company: Private Media Group
- Release date: 1999
- Running time: 136 minutes
- Language: English

The Uranus Experiment is a 1999 three-part pornographic science fiction video produced by the Swedish production and distribution company Private Media Group that is notable for being partially shot in microgravity. In a scene from the second part, the performers Sylvia Saint and Nick Lang have sex in zero gravity for about 20 seconds. The scene was shot during a parabolic flight.

The filming process for the microgravity scene was particularly difficult from a technical and logistical standpoint. Budget constraints allowed for only one take for the microgravity shot. The other "zero-gravity" shots in the film are faked.

Described as an "anal space opera", the film features music by Liam Howlett from The Prodigy and Robert Del Naja from Massive Attack.

Its director John Millerman was nominated in the Best Script category in the 1999 Nebula Awards by a disgruntled group of science fiction authors as a protest against the policies of the awarding body. It did not win the award, which was won by M. Night Shyamalan for his script for his film The Sixth Sense.

Regarding the possibility of amateurs hiring a parabolic flight plane to emulate the film, Berth Milton, Jr, the CEO of Private Media Group, said that "You would not want to be afraid of flying, that's for sure!"
