= Reduced-gravity aircraft =

Aircraft used to create brief weightlessness

Trajectory for zero gravity maneuver

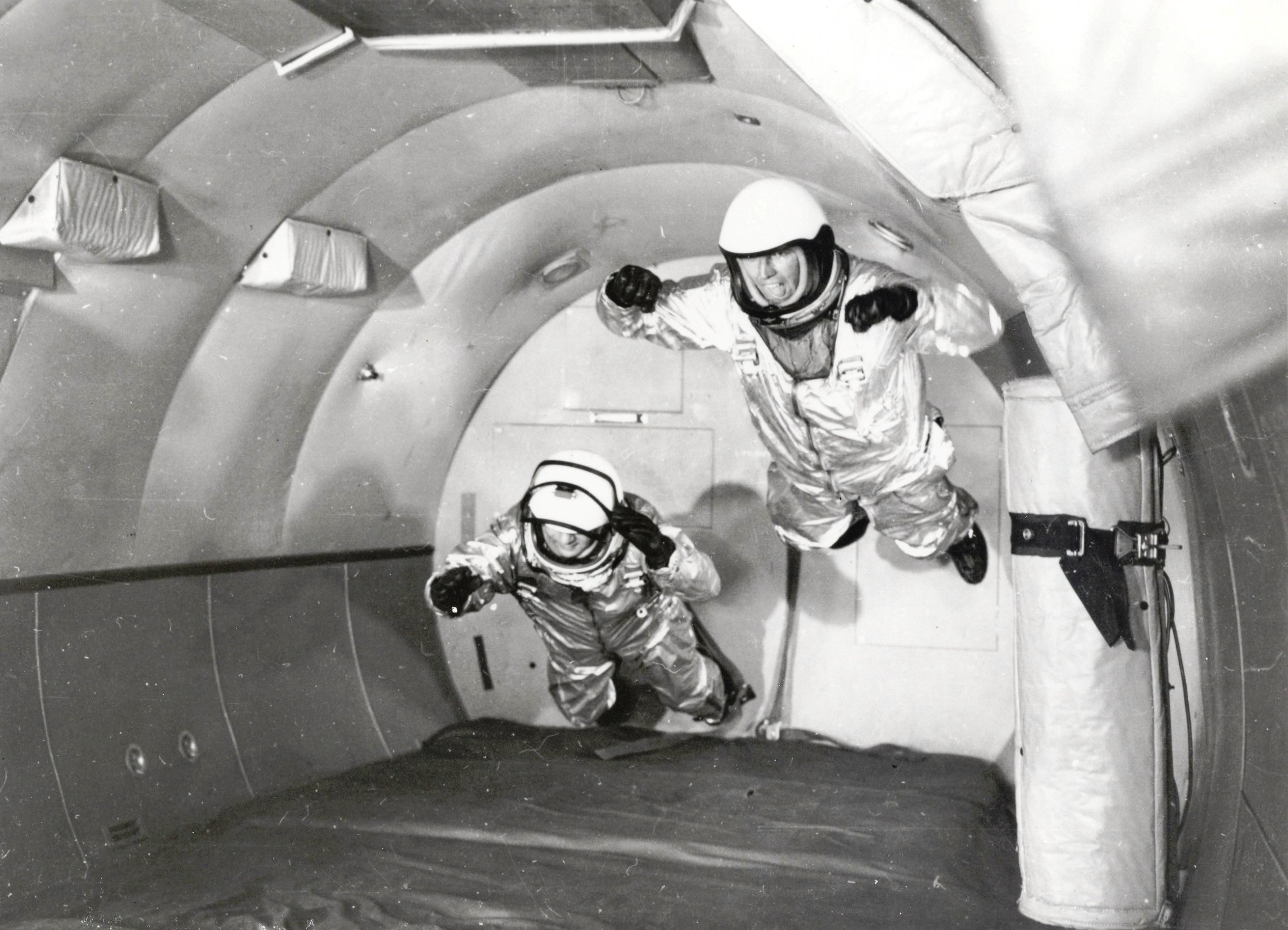
Project Mercury astronauts on board a C-131 Samaritan flying as the "vomit comet" in 1959

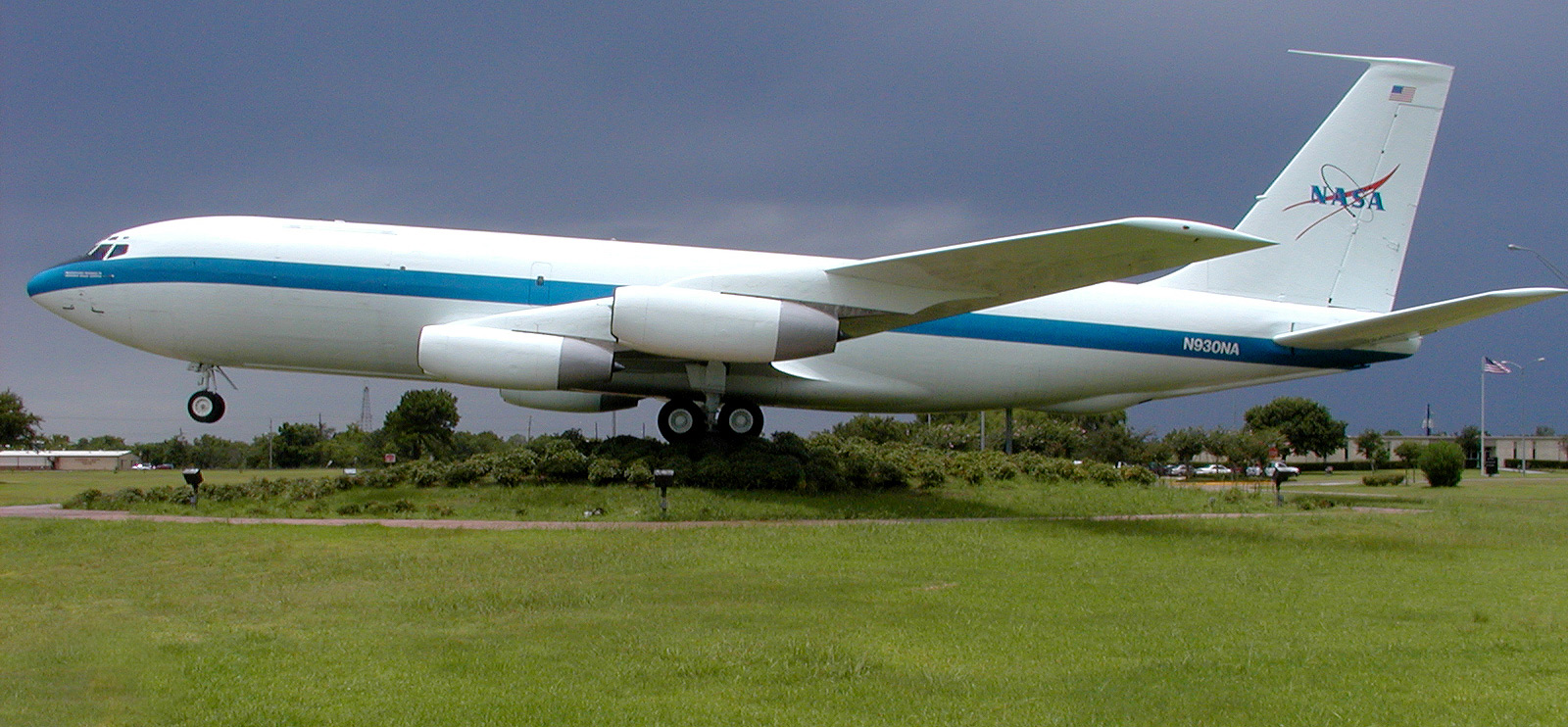
KC-135 0-G aircraft nicknamed "Vomit Comet"

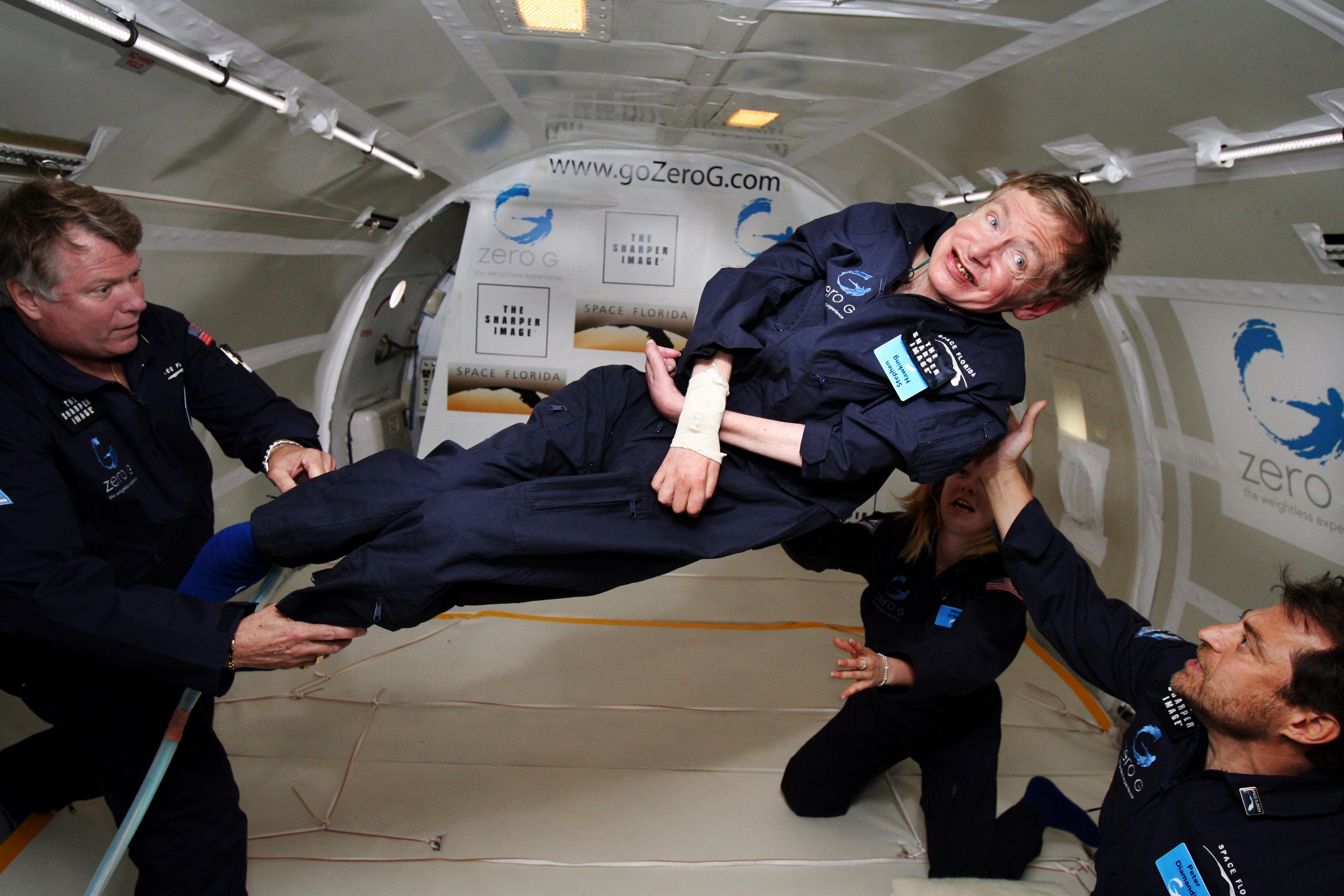
Physicist Stephen Hawking on board a reduced-gravity aircraft in April 2007

A reduced-gravity aircraft is a type of fixed-wing aircraft that provides brief near-weightless environments for training astronauts, conducting research, and making gravity-free movie shots.

Versions of such airplanes were operated by the NASA Reduced Gravity Research Program, and one is currently operated by the Human Spaceflight and Robotic Exploration Programmes of the European Space Agency. The unofficial nickname "vomit comet" became popular among those who experienced their operation.

== History ==
Parabolic flight as a way of simulating weightlessness was first proposed by the German aerospace engineer Fritz Haber and his brother, physicist Heinz Haber in 1950. Both had been brought to the US after World War II as part of Operation Paperclip. As well, Shih-Chun Wang studied nausea in astronauts for NASA, which helped lead to the creation of the vomit comet.

Parabolic flights are sometimes used to examine the effects of weightlessness on a living organism. While humans are by far the most common passengers, animals have occasionally been involved in experiments, including a notable experiment on how weightlessness affected a domestic cat's righting reflex and a pigeon's attempts to navigate in a weightless state.

== Operating principles ==
The aircraft gives its occupants the sensation of weightlessness by following a parabolic flight path, which is the path that objects naturally follow while in free fall. The aircraft is used in this way to demonstrate to astronauts what it is like to orbit the Earth. During this time the aircraft does not need to exert any ground reaction force on its contents to keep them stationary relative to the aircraft, causing the sensation of weightlessness.

Initially, the aircraft climbs with a pitch angle of about 45 degrees. The sensation of weightlessness is achieved by reducing thrust and lowering the nose to maintain a neutral, or "zero lift", configuration such that the aircraft follows the same path that an object in free fall, with no air resistance, would follow. Engine thrust is used to exactly compensate for drag. Weightlessness begins at the point when the plane starts to follow this parabolic path, which is while the plane is ascending. It lasts through the rest of the ascent, and into the descent phase, until the aircraft must pull up, usually when it reaches a downward pitch angle of around 30 degrees. The aircraft then pulls back up to repeat the maneuver. During this pull-up, the forces felt are roughly twice that of gravity. This cycle can be repeated.

This aircraft is used to train astronauts in zero-g maneuvers, giving them about 25 seconds of weightlessness out of 65 seconds of flight in each parabola. During such training, the airplane typically flies about 40–60 parabolic manoeuvres. In about two thirds of the passengers, these flights produce nausea due to airsickness, giving the plane its nickname "vomit comet".

== Operators ==
=== Canada ===
The Canadian Space Agency and the National Research Council have a Falcon 20 used for microgravity research. The small plane is normally not used for people to float freely and experience weightlessness; however, comedian Rick Mercer did so for a segment of his show.

=== Ecuador ===
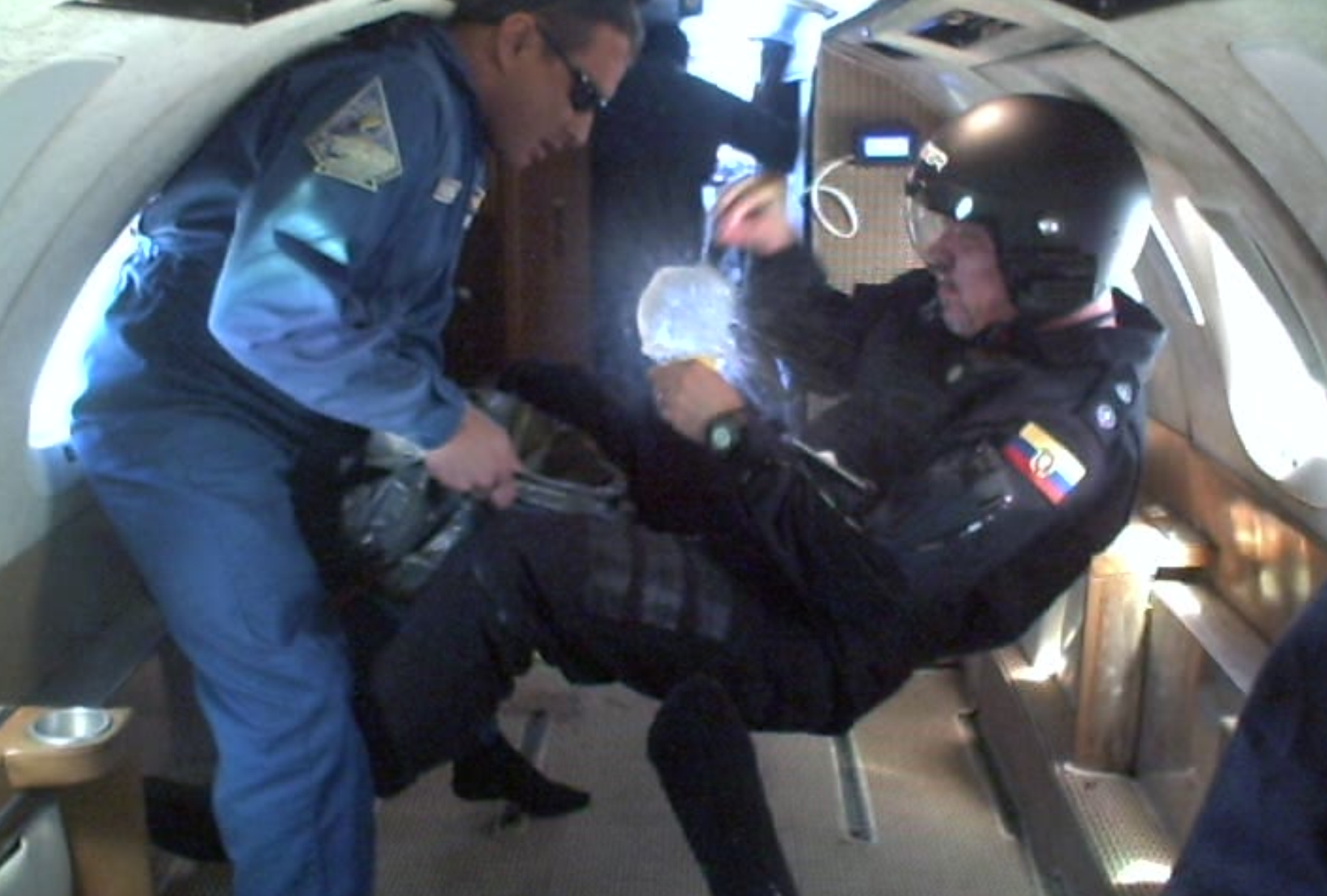
Ecuadorian crew in weightlessness

The first zero G plane to enter service in Latin America is a T-39 Sabreliner nicknamed CONDOR, operated for the Ecuadorian Civilian Space Agency and the Ecuadorian Air Force since May 2008. On June 19, 2008, this plane carried a seven-year-old boy, setting the Guinness world record for the youngest person to fly in microgravity.

=== Europe ===
Since 1984, ESA and the CNES have flown reduced-gravity missions in a variety of aircraft, including NASA's KC-135, a Caravelle, an Ilyushin Il-76MDK, and an Airbus A300 known as the Zero-G. In 2014 the A300 was phased out in favor of a more modern Airbus A310, also named Zero-G. It is based at Bordeaux-Mérignac airport in France, operated by Novespace, and has also been flown from Paris Le Bourget airport and Dübendorf Air Base in Switzerland. Since 1997 CNES subsidiary Novespace has handled the management of these flights.

This A310 Zero G aircraft is used also to realize commercial flights for public passengers in partnership between operator Novespace and the Avico company, under Air Zero G brand. The aircraft has also been used for cinema purposes, with Tom Cruise and Annabelle Wallis filming for The Mummy in 2017.

=== Russia ===
In Russia, commercial flights are offered on the Ilyushin Il-76MDK jet; several U.S. companies book flights on these jets.

The Indian Air force also used them to train the first batch of Indian Astronauts for the Gaganyaan Project of ISRO.

=== United States ===
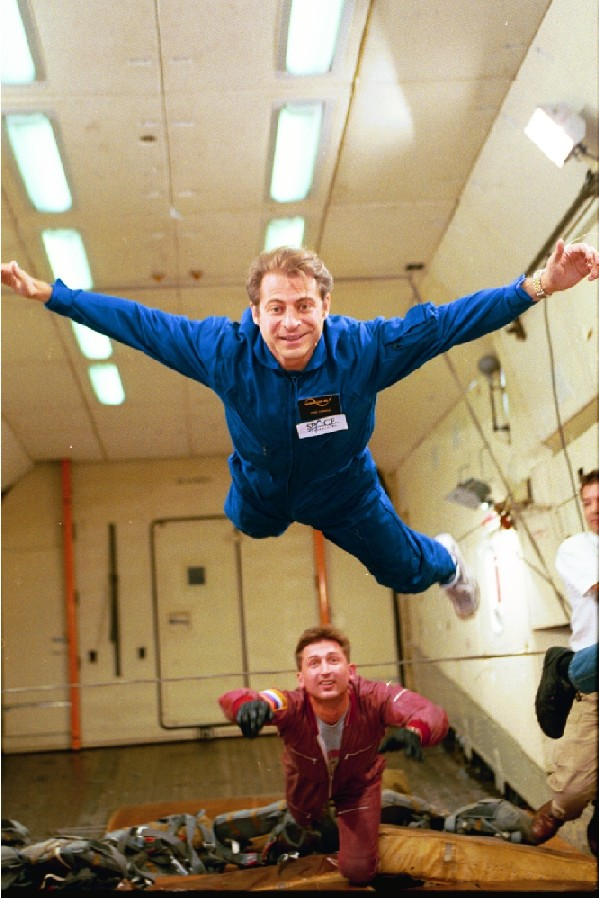
Peter Diamandis of Zero Gravity Corporation

==== NASA ====
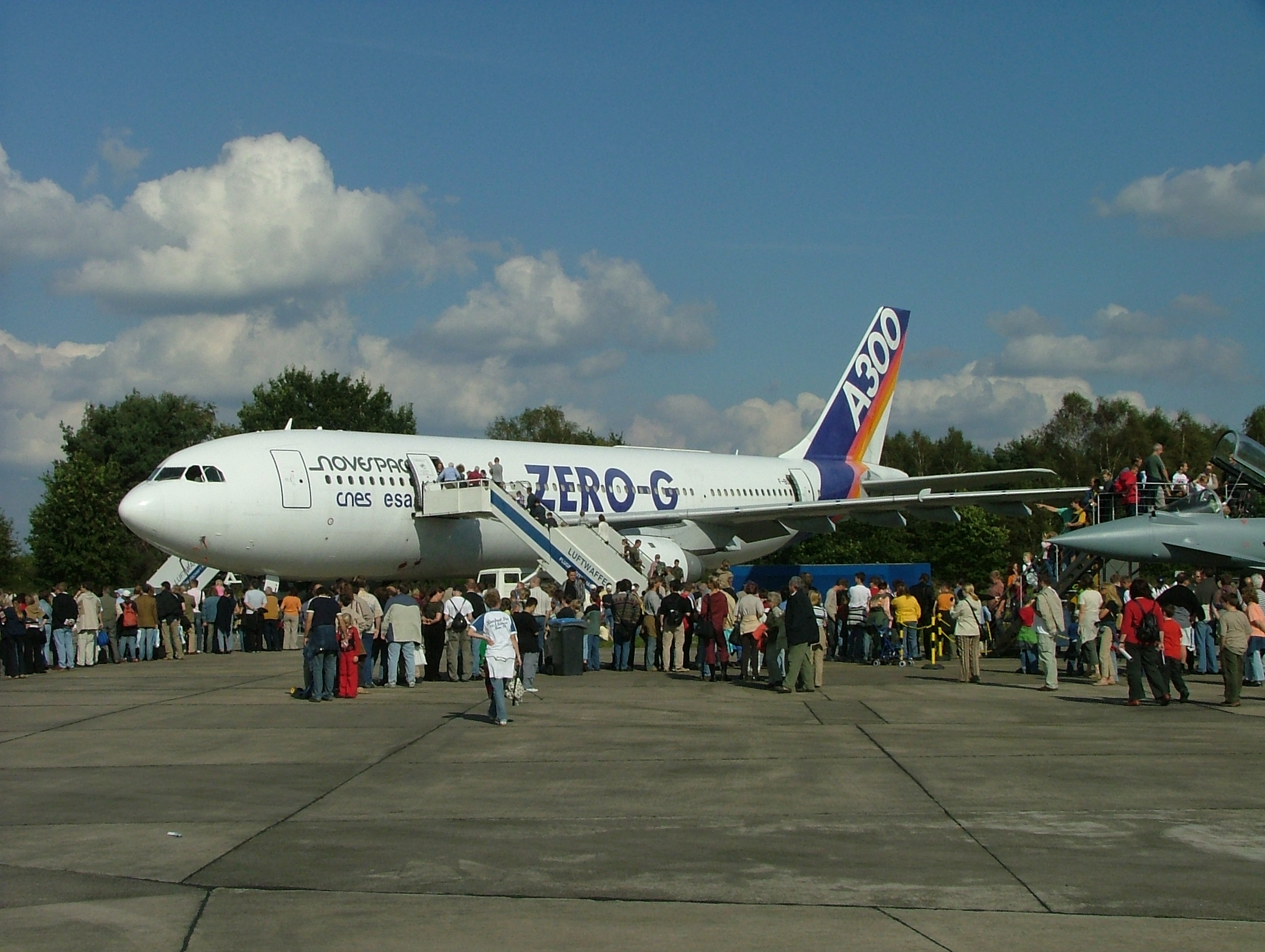
A300-Zero-G

NASA flew zero gravity flights on various aircraft for many years. In 1959 Project Mercury astronauts trained in a C-131 Samaritan aircraft dubbed the "vomit comet".

Twin KC-135 Stratotankers were used until December 2004 and later retired. One, a KC-135A registered N930NA (also known as NASA 930, formerly USAF serial no. 59-1481), flew more than 58,000 parabolas after NASA acquired it in 1973, before being retired in 1995. It is now on display at Ellington Field, near the Johnson Space Center. The other (N931NA or NASA 931, formerly AF serial no. 63-7998) was also used by Universal Pictures and Imagine Entertainment for filming scenes involving weightlessness in the movie Apollo 13; it made its final flight on October 29, 2004, and is permanently stored in the Pima Air & Space Museum in Tucson, Arizona.

In 2005 NASA replaced these aircraft with a McDonnell Douglas C-9B Skytrain II (N932NA) formerly owned by KLM Royal Dutch Airlines and the United States Navy.

NASA concluded the Reduced Gravity Research Program and ended operations in July 2014, due to aircraft technical problems. It is replaced with private company contracts.

As of 2015 NASA had a microgravity services contract with Zero Gravity Corporation (ZERO-G) and used its aircraft, G-FORCE ONE, a modified Boeing 727-200.

==== Other operators ====
In late 2004, the Zero Gravity Corporation became the first company in the United States to offer zero-g flights to the general public, using Boeing 727 jets. Each flight consists of around 15 parabolas, including simulations of the gravity levels of the Moon and Mars, as well as complete weightlessness.

In 2015, Integrated Spaceflight Services, began serving as the research and education integrator of the National Research Council of Canada for the US market, offering comprehensive reduced-gravity services on a modified Falcon 20 aircraft. ISS has flown annual microgravity research campaigns to evaluate space suits and other technologies with Project PoSSUM.

Aurora Aerospace in Oldsmar, Florida offers zero-g flights using a Fuji/Rockwell Commander 700. It is also used to simulate the gravity of the Moon and Mars.

== Airsickness ==
According to former Reduced Gravity Research Program director John Yaniec, anxiety contributes most to passengers' airsickness. The stress on their bodies creates a sense of panic and therefore causes the passenger to vomit. Yaniec gives a rough estimate of passengers, that "one third [become] violently ill, the next third moderately ill, and the final third not at all." Vomiting is referred to as being "ill".

Scopolamine is often used as an antiemetic during reduced-gravity-aircraft training.

== Use in media production ==
The 1995 film Apollo 13 filmed many scenes aboard NASA's KC-135 parabolic aircraft.

In 2016, rock group OK Go recorded a music video for their single "Upside Down & Inside Out" on a reduced-gravity aircraft, which involved acrobatic choreography created specifically for the zero-gravity environment. The production was done with the assistance of Russian cosmonauts.

The adult entertainment production company Private Media Group has filmed a pornographic movie called The Uranus Experiment: Part Two where a zero-gravity intercourse scene was filmed aboard a reduced-gravity aircraft. The filming process was particularly difficult from a technical and logistical standpoint. Budget constraints allowed for only one 20-second shot, featuring the actors Sylvia Saint and Nick Lang. Berth Milton, Jr, president and CEO of Private Media Group, said in 2000 "You would not want to be afraid of flying, that's for sure!"

The ZERO-G corporation was featured in the MythBusters NASA Moon Landing Conspiracy episode, in which it flew Adam Savage and Jamie Hyneman on a custom flight path to replicate the Moon's gravity. This allowed Savage to replicate the footage of Neil Armstrong walking on the Moon, disarming claims that the footage was forged.

== See also ==
- Micro-g environment
- Space tourism
- Astronaut training
- Zero Gravity Research Facility
- Fallturm Bremen
