= Silvia Saint =

Czech pornographic film actress

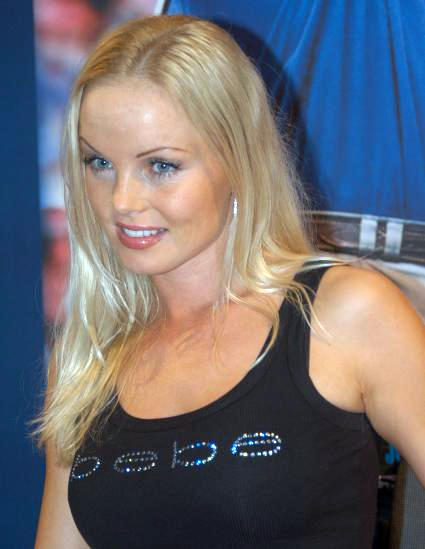
- Saint in 2005
- Born: 1976 (age 49–50); Czechoslovakia
- Website: www.silviasaint.com

Silvia Saint (born 1976) is a Czech former pornographic film actress. She began performing in the 1990s and subsequently worked in Europe and the US, appearing in more than 150 productions by 2006. She received several adult-industry awards and was inducted into the AVN Hall of Fame in 2012.

== Early life ==
Saint was born in 1976 in Czechoslovakia (in that part which was to become the Czech Republic). An only child, she faced significant hardship, including poverty and the death of her father during her early childhood. After studying management for two years, she worked as an accountant and marketing coordinator.

== Career ==
Saint then began a career in erotic modeling, first appearing in lingerie, then posing nude in magazines, and finally appearing in pornographic films. She was Penthouse Pet of the Year in the 1996 Czech edition. After her introduction to the American porn industry, she became the October 1998 Penthouse Pet of the Month (U.S. edition).

She performed in a Private Media Group sex in space-themed pornographic film The Uranus Experiment: Part Two. The film featured around 20 seconds of Saint and Nick Lang having sex in freefall (the scene was shot during a parabolic flight). It was nominated in the Best Script category for a Nebula Award, but it did not win.

Saint was awarded a Lifetime Achievement Award at Torino Sex 2005, Turin's second annual Delta of Venus Fair.

In 2006, she won the rights to the Internet domain name silviasaint.com from a cybersquatter in a Uniform Domain-Name Dispute-Resolution Policy action. In 2007, the mobile game Sylvia Saint in Erotic Pool was released for Java ME-supported phones. Since 2007, she has only starred and performed in lesbian sex movies, while also taking care of the auditions as director and producer to her official website.

== Awards ==
- 1998 AVN Award – Best Tease Performance (Fresh Meat 4)
- 2000 Hot d'Or – Best European Supporting Actress (Le Contrat des Anges)
- 2000 FICEB Ninfa Award – Best Lesbian Scene (Alexia and Cie), with Nikki Anderson & Kate More
- 2004 FICEB Ninfa Award – Public Award for Best Actress
- 2005 FICEB Ninfa Award – Public Award for Best Actress
- 2005 Torino Sex – Lifetime Achievement
- 2012 AVN Hall of Fame
