= Private (magazine) =

Pornographic magazine

- Cover of issue 134, published April 1996
- Categories: Pornographic magazine
- Frequency: Every two months
- First issue: 1965; 60 years ago
- Company: Private Media Group (since 1991)

Private was a pornographic magazine published by the Swedish publisher and distributor Private Media Group. The magazine was famous for its combination of high-quality photography and depiction of sex acts typical of hardcore pornography such as anal sex, an innovation at the time of its creation. The American pornographer Al Goldstein described it as "[the] best porno magazine in the world".

The magazine was created in 1965 by the Swedish photographer Berth Milton Sr., who initially included his pornographic photographs in erotic magazines, which he distributed in his bookshop in Stockholm. He sold the first issues of his magazine himself to newspaper kiosks, since there was no distribution for such magazines.

After the 1966 United States Supreme Court decision Memoirs v. Massachusetts, the prohibition of pornography in the United States was questioned for the first time. The magazine, previously distributed under the counter in the United States, has since been sold openly there and, from its ninth issue, is considered the United States' first legally distributed pornographic magazine.

Since the mid-1980s, Private has been published in Barcelona, Spain, which was the second largest market for pornographic products after Germany. The magazine became the best-selling pornographic magazine in the world, before losing importance in the course of the digitalization of pornography in the 1990s.

Private Media Group was founded in 1991 by Berth Milton Jr. who extended the Private brand by adding web offerings to the portfolio, expanded video production and successfully took the company public. The magazine Private, which forms the cornerstone of the company, continues to this day.

The erotic art book publisher Taschen has published two collections, each in five volumes, featuring photographic works published in Private in the 1970s and 1980s.
