= Tove Meyer =

Swedish poet, writer and journalist

Tove Cecilia Meyer (1 October 1983) is a Swedish poet, writer and journalist.

== Career ==
She is a coauthor of the much-discussed biography Carl XVI Gustaf – Den motvillige monarken, together with Thomas Sjöberg and Deanne Rauscher. The book was published by Lind & Co in 2010.

Her first poetry collection, Asfaltshimmel, was published in 2016. She published her first novel, Ha ett underbart år, in 2020.

She has also published poems in the Swedish poetry magazine Populär Poesi and in a number of anthologies.

Meyer has, among other things, worked as a researcher for the talk show Skavlan and as the main producer for Musikhjälpen in 2017, and is previously known as a radio producer at Sveriges Radio P3.

In April 2018, she was appointed as the cultural manager for Strömstad Municipality.

== Bibliography ==
- 2020 – Ha ett underbart år
- 2016 – Asfaltshimmel
- 2010 – Carl XVI Gustaf - den motvillige monarken
