= Private Media =

Private Media may refer to:

- Private Media (Australia), an independent Australian media company, publisher of Crikey and other news and information websites
- Private Media Group, a Swedish company based in Ireland, publisher of adult entertainment
