= XVideos =

Pornographic video sharing and viewing website

- Website type: Pornographic video sharing
- Available in: English, Chinese, Czech, Dutch, French, Hindi, Italian, Japanese, Portuguese, Romanian, Spanish, Afrikaans and others
- Headquarters: Prague, Czech Republic
- Country of origin: France
- Owner: WGCZ Holding
- Founder: Stéphane Michael Pacaud
- Website: www.xvideos.com
- Advertising: Yes
- Commercial: Yes
- Registration: Optional
- Launched: 1 March 2007; 19 years ago
- Current status: Online
- Written in: HTML, JavaScript, PHP

XVideos (stylized as XVIDEOS) is a Czech-French Internet pornography video sharing and viewing website. Founded in Paris in 2007, the website is now registered to the Czech company WGCZ Holding. As of October 2025, it is the 30th-most-visited website in the world and the third-most-visited pornography website after Pornhub and xHamster.

WGCZ Holding also owns Bang Bros, Penthouse magazine, Private Media Group, XNXX, DDF Network and Erogames and has a controlling interest in the productions gathered under the Legal Porno brand.

== History ==
Former XVideos logo

XVideos was founded in Paris in 2007 by the French owner, Stéphane Michael Pacaud. XVideos serves as a pornographic media aggregator, a type of website which gives access to adult content in a similar manner as YouTube does for general content. Video clips from professional videos are mixed with amateur and other types of content. By 2012, XVideos was the largest porn website in the world, with over 100 billion page views per month.

Fabian Thylmann, the owner of MindGeek (now Aylo), attempted to purchase XVideos in 2012 in order to create a monopoly of pornographic tube sites. The French owner of XVideos turned down a reported offer of more than US$120 million by saying, "Sorry, I have to go and play Diablo II."

In 2014, XVideos controversially attempted to force content providers to either pledge to renounce the right to delete videos from their accounts or to shut down their accounts immediately. The company is now owned by both Stéphane Michael Pacaud and his sister, Malorie Debroah Pacaud.

== Web traffic and ranking ==
As of August 2021, XVideos was the most-visited porn website and the seventh-most-visited website in the world, as ranked by Similarweb.

XNXX, another site owned by WGCZ Holding, was the tenth-most-visited website overall and the second-most-visited website in the adult category by 2021, although competitor Pornhub was ranked one slot above XNXX by 2024. Both XVideos and XNXX were also the world's most-visited websites for virtual reality videos in 2021.

== Legal ==
In 2015, XVideos became involved in a legal case against MindGeek (currently known as Aylo).

In a 2021 article, journalists Jakub Zelenka and Lukáš Prattle investigated abuse from XVideos brand, Legal Porno. Testimonies, both publicly available and obtained for the article, included women being uninformed about the films intent and having to engage in dangerous and complicated practices. Health concerns also appeared, such as one participant going to the hospital and many struggling with bowel movements afterwards.

== See also ==
- List of most-visited websites
- List of online video platforms
- Porn 2.0 – Pornographic websites featuring user-generated content
