= Jacquie et Michel =

Pornography production company

Jacquie et Michel is a French brand of the American company JetM Technology Solutions (LLC) operated by a group of companies and primarily associated with several pornographic websites, including video-on-demand (VoD) services. The group also controls sex shops bearing its name and the print magazine Hot Vidéo. It is active in the events sector (nightclub parties) and sells related products.

== Development and commercial success ==
Jacquie et Michel began as an amateur and gradually became more professional, notably with the registration of the trademark in 2004.

In 2007, Jacquie et Michel TV was launched, now the group's most popular site.

The group reportedly generated €25 million in revenue in 2017, owns around thirty websites, employs around twenty staff members, and around sixty people in total, including producers working in partnership with it, store managers, party organizers, etc.

In December 2016, the owners of the Jacquie et Michel brand acquired the magazine Hot Vidéo, and the group established itself as one of the two heavyweights in the French pornography industry. The acquisition of Colmax in November 2019 allowed it to be present in all the largest subscription television packages.

== Legal issues and ownership ==
The group, which made its brand very popular by relying on the fantasy of consensual libertinism, has been the subject of controversy due to its legal opacity and the violent practices of some of its independent producers in the videos it broadcasts. It was the subject of a judicial investigation in July 2020 for pimping and rape. In June 2022, the site's former owner, Michel Piron, was indicted for "complicity in rape and complicity in human trafficking." In November 2024, his indictment was quashed by the investigating judges; he was given the more favorable status of assisted witness, and was no longer prosecuted.

Announced as having been taken over by an American group, the newspaper Le Monde reported that through a tangle of companies in various countries, the new final owner of Jacquie et Michel is the Czech group WGCZ belonging to the Frenchman Stéphane Pacaud who acquired the whole in September 2024.
