= WGCZ Holding =

Joint-stock holding company

- Type: Private
- Industry: Pornography
- Founded: 18 August 2014
- Headquarters: Krakovská 1366/25, Nové Město, Prague, Czech Republic
- Key people: Stéphane Pacaud; Robert Seifert; Marjorie Grocq
- Brands: XNXX; XVideos
- Revenue: 17,001,000 Czech koruna (2023)
- Operating income: −898,000 Czech koruna (2023)
- Net income: −17,446,000 Czech koruna (2023)
- Total assets: 821,118,000 Czech koruna (2023)
- Subsidiaries: Bang Bros; Private Media Group; Penthouse Global Media

WGCZ Holding a.s. is a Czech holding company based in Prague and one of the major corporate groups in internet pornography. The group includes the pornography video-sharing websites XVideos and XNXX, as well as adult-entertainment companies and brands including Bang Bros, Private Media Group and Penthouse. WGCZ Holding is wholly owned by French entrepreneur Stéphane Pacaud.

== History ==
=== XNXX ===
In 2002, the domain XNXX was first registered to Stéphane Pacaud in Paris. It quickly rose to become one of the top visited websites in the world. The original site hosted lists of galleries of pornographic photos sorted into limited categories of interest, with new lists added daily. By 2004 the site boasted of "sex pictures & movies & stories updated every 30 minutes", with thousands of photos across over 60 categories. XNXX is still a major tube site that ranks among the most trafficked websites globally as of 2026.

=== XVideos ===
In 2007, XVideos was registered to Stéphane Pacaud, also in Paris, as a sister website to XNXX. The site served functionally as a mirror to XNXX, hosting much of the same content and redirecting traffic to the older website. XVideos outgrew its status as a secondary website to the older XNXX by 2009, experiencing exponential growth over the 2010s. The site offered nearly 13,000 videos in 2008, a year later the platform reported around 90,000. By 2022, over 10 million videos have been uploaded to the site with many more being added every day. XVideos remains a highly trafficked site, consistently ranking as the second most popular pornographic website after Pornhub.

=== Formation ===
By 2012, the growing success of XNXX and XVideos led to the establishment of WebGroup Czech Republic a.s. (formerly WGCZ s.r.o.) to manage the rapidly growing brands. Additional acquisitions and incorporation of new corporate entities led to the establishment of WGCZ Holding as a parent company to many of the properties associated with Stéphane Pacaud. The company was incorporated in Prague, Czech Republic in 2014 with Robert Seifert as the sole member of the company’s Statutory body.

== Expansion and acquisitions ==
Throughout the 2010s, numerous subsidiary companies were registered with Stéphane Pacaud listed as the owner. The company pursued an aggressive acquisition strategy, purchasing established production studios and content platforms. Subsidiaries of WGCZ acquired several notable production studios such as LegalPorno (renamed AnalVids), a site known for its hardcore content. This acquisition was followed by the purchase of Private Media Group, one of the oldest and most recognized brands in adult entertainment, founded in 1965.

The company's most notable acquisition came in 2018 when it purchased Penthouse Global Media, Inc. and the iconic Penthouse magazine brand at a bankruptcy auction for $11.2 million, winning out against Aylo (previously MindGeek), the company responsible for PornHub among other top-name adult websites.

In 2017, WGCZ acquired the Miami-based production company Bang Bros. which operates a network of over 40 adult sites. Girls Gone Wild was acquired by BangBros in 2014, adding another notable name under the WGCZ umbrella.

In a 2026 report, the Office of the United Nations High Commissioner for Human Rights mentioned a reported widespread monetization of non-consensual sexual content and inadequate age verification on pornographic websites owned by WGCZ Holding, among others.

== Controversies and legal challenges ==
As XVideos and XNXX grew to become among the world's most-visited websites, WGCZ Holding faced increasing scrutiny over content moderation practices. Critics and advocacy groups have accused the platforms of insufficient measures to prevent the distribution of non-consensual content and material depicting sexual violence. Several lawsuits have been filed against the company by survivors alleging that videos of their abuse were hosted on WGCZ-owned sites.

In 2024, the European Union designated XVideos as a "very large online platform" under the Digital Services Act, subjecting it to much stricter content moderation requirements and regulatory oversight.
