= Kelly Holland =

American publisher

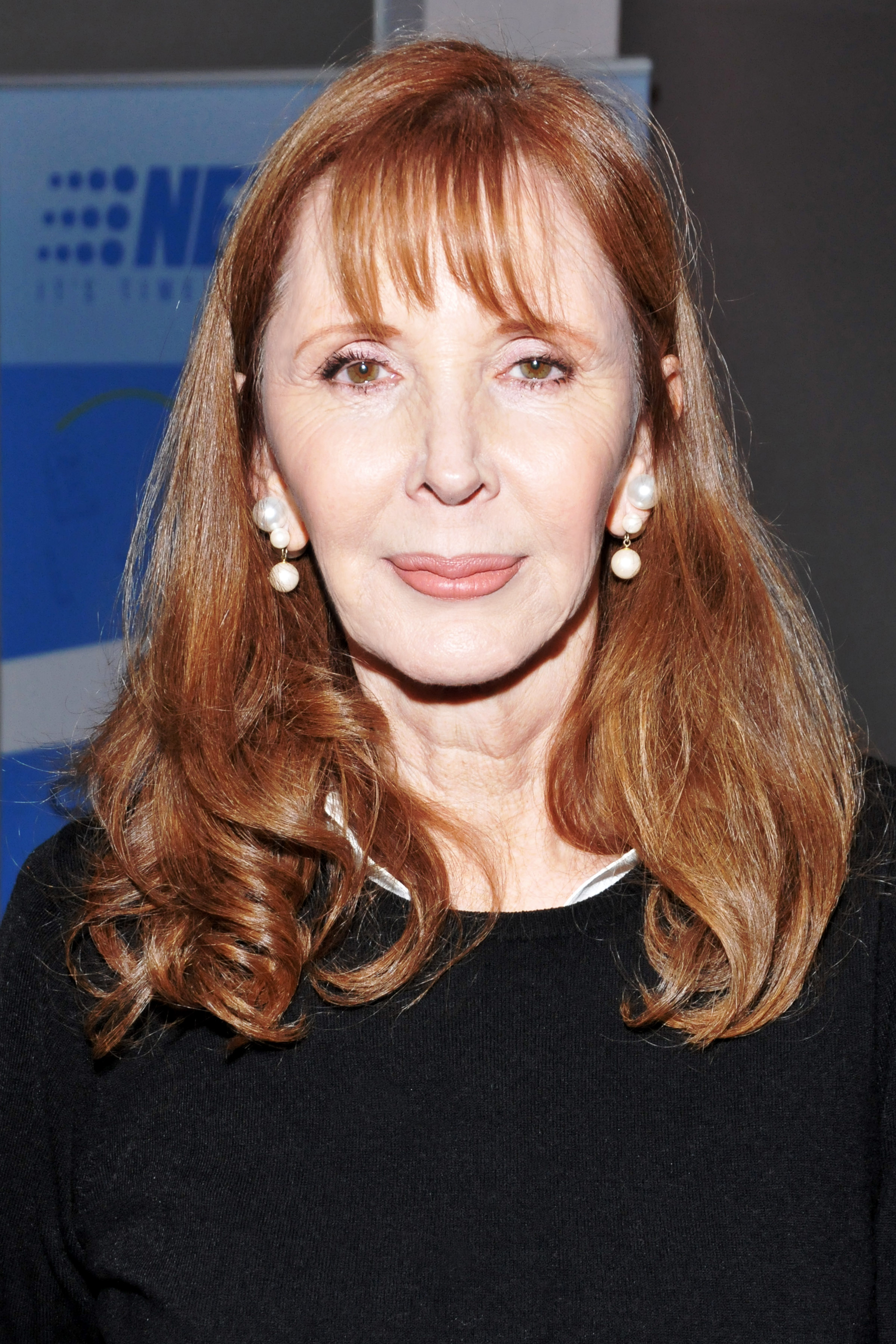
- Holland in West Hollywood, California in January 2016
- Born: Texas, U.S.
- Other name: Toni English
- Occupations: Publisher, director, producer

Kelly Holland is the former CEO and owner of Penthouse Global Media Inc., as well as a director and producer.

== Career ==
A former mainstream documentarian, Holland directed her first adult film in 1994 under an exclusive contract with Vivid Entertainment. She went on to direct films for other companies, including the award-winning 22-volume series Naked Hollywood for Adam & Eve Pictures. She became head of production for Playgirl TV in 2005, and appeared in several mainstream media outlets as the company's spokesperson.

Holland is the founder of Chick Media, a multimedia corporation that produces erotic programming for women. In 2009, she became the executive producer of Penthouse Films.

In 2016, Holland became the CEO and owner of Penthouse Global Media. She was since been responsible for a complete overhaul of the brand and its properties, initially with guidance from then-publisher of Penthouse's Australian edition, Damien Costas.

In addition to overseeing all video production, she is also responsible for the company's ten satellite channels in 100 countries, product licensing, international publications, and the Penthouse Clubs.

== Awards ==
- 2008 Feminist Porn Award – Sexiest Straight Film – My Sex Therapist.com: The First Sessions
- 2011 Venus Award – Business Woman of the Year
- 2017 AVN Hall of Fame inductee – Performers and directors
