= Escambia County Area Transit =

Transit agency serving the greater Pensacola, Escambia County, Florida area

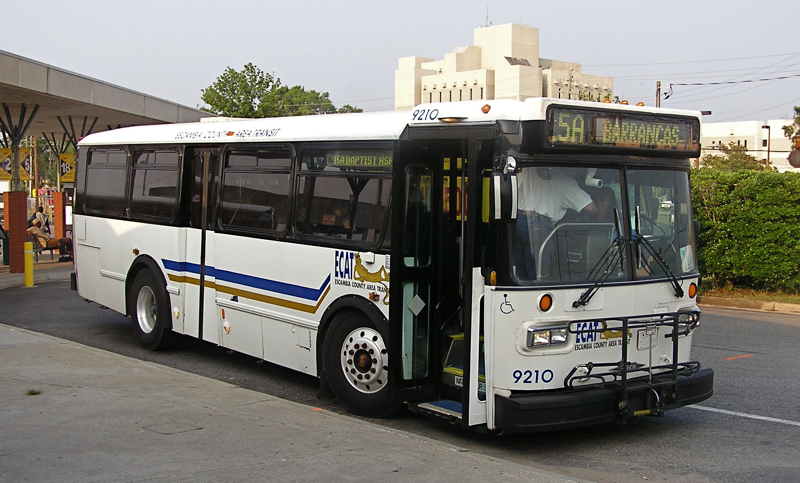
- ECAT bus in Pensacola, 2006
- Headquarters: 1515 West Fairfield Drive
- Locale: Pensacola, FL
- Service area: Escambia County, Florida
- Service type: Fixed route bus service
- Fleet: Gillig, ElDorado, Champion
- Operator: Dept of Escambia County
- Website: goecat.com

Escambia County Area Transit (ECAT) is the transit agency that serves the greater Pensacola, Escambia County, Florida area. It is owned by the Escambia County government which began managing the agency in 1971. ECAT served 1.23 million riders in October 2016 - September 2017.

== Fleet ==
The ECAT fleet is composed of buses manufactured by Gillig, ElDorado, and Champion. There are 32 buses in the fleet as of January 2016.
