= European Centre for Algorithmic Transparency =

Centre for algorithmic transparency research

The European Centre for Algorithmic Transparency (ECAT) provides scientific and technical expertise to support the enforcement of the Digital Services Act (DSA) and researches the impact of algorithmic systems deployed by online platforms and search engines. Launched in 2023, ECAT is part of the Joint Research Centre within the European Commission, working in close collaboration with the Directorate General Communications Networks, Content and Technology (DG CONNECT).

== Context and mission ==
The ever-increasing societal impact of online platforms such as social networks, online marketplaces, and search engines has created an urgent need for public oversight of the processes at the core of their businesses. The automated processes deployed to moderate content and curate information for users warrant particular scrutiny, as they affect everything — from social interactions, to news and entertainment consumption, to shopping habits.

The DSA requires designated Very Large Online Platforms (VLOPs) and Very Large Online Search Engines (VLOSEs) operating in the European Union to identify, analyse and assess certain systemic risks stemming from the design and functioning of their service and related systems, including algorithmic systems. Moreover, they must commit to addressing identified risks, directly or indirectly related to the functioning of the algorithmic system in use.

ECAT's mission is to contribute to the supervision and enforcement of the DSA in two core ways. Firstly, by providing technical assistance and practical guidance for the enforcement of the DSA. Secondly, by researching the long-running impact of algorithmic systems to inform policy-making and contribute to the public discussion.

Throughout its work, ECAT takes an interdisciplinary approach by integrating technical, ethical, economic, legal and environmental perspectives. It also engages with an international community of researchers and practitioners within academia, civil society, national public administrations and industry. Its ultimate goal is to guarantee that European citizens can navigate a safer digital environment.

== Activities ==
ECAT's work has three pillars:

1. Platform assessments and investigations

- Algorithmic system inspections to support enforcement of the DSA.
- Technical tests on algorithmic systems to enhance the understanding of their functioning.
- Advice on procedures to secure data access to regulators and researchers.

2. Scientific research and foresight

- Study of the short, mid and long-term societal impact of algorithmic systems.
- Identification and measurement of systemic risks associated with VLOPs and VLOSEs and risk mitigation measures.
- Development of practical methodologies towards fair, transparent and accountable algorithmic approaches, with a focus on recommender systems and information retrieval.

3. Networking and community building

- Sharing of knowledge and facilitation of discussions on algorithmic transparency with international stakeholders.
- Acting as a knowledge hub for research conducted through data access provided by the DSA.

== See also ==
- Ethics of artificial intelligence
- Regulation of algorithms
- Regulation of artificial intelligence
- Algorithmic bias
