= Berth Milton Sr. =

Swedish pornographer and businessman

Berth Milton Sr. (26 November 1926 – 31 December 2005) was a Swedish pornographer and businessman. He is known for his creation of Private, the first full-color hardcore pornographic magazine, in 1965. Later, he went on to build one of the most renowned brand names in modern pornography. He was the father of Berth Milton Jr., the current majority owner and former CEO of Private Media Group, the company that now publishes the magazine and other properties under the Private brand.
