= Information society service =

EU Directive

In EU law, an information society service (ISS) is any service normally provided for remuneration, at a distance, by electronic means and at the individual request of a service recipient. The concept is defined in EU directive 2015/1535, as part of regulations applying to big tech and online media services in the information society.

== Contents ==
Article 1(b) defines a 'service' as any information society service normally provided for remuneration, at a distance, by electronic means and at the individual request of a recipient of services. An indicative list of examples is set out in Annex I.

1. Services not provided ‘at a distance’

Services provided in the physical presence of the provider and the recipient, even if they involve the use of electronic devices: (a) medical examinations or treatment at a doctor's surgery using electronic equipment where the patient is physically present; (b) consultation of an electronic catalogue in a shop with the customer on site; (c) plane ticket reservation at a travel agency in the physical presence of the customer by means of a network of computers; (d) electronic games made available in a video arcade where the customer is physically present.

2. Services not provided ‘by electronic means’ — services having material content even though provided via electronic devices: (a) automatic cash or ticket dispensing machines (banknotes, rail tickets); (b) access to road networks, car parks, etc., charging for use, even if there are electronic devices at the entrance/exit controlling access and/or ensuring correct payment is made, — offline services: distribution of CD-ROMs or software on diskettes, — services which are not provided via electronic processing/inventory systems: (a) voice telephony services; (b) telefax/telex services; (c) services provided via voice telephony or fax; (d) telephone/telefax consultation of a doctor; (e) telephone/telefax consultation of a lawyer; (f) telephone/telefax direct marketing.

3. Services not supplied ‘at the individual request of a recipient of services’ Services provided by transmitting data without individual demand for simultaneous reception by an unlimited number of individual receivers (point to multipoint transmission): (a) television broadcasting services (including near-video on-demand services), covered by point (e) of Article 1(1) of Directive 2010/13/EU; (b) radio broadcasting services;

(c) (televised) teletext.

== History ==
Information Society Service (ISS) - the term was initially introduced on 22 June 1998 by Directive 98/34/EC of the European Parliament and of the Council by describing procedure for the provision of information in the field of technical standards and regulations in Article 1(2) of Directive 98/34 definition of ISS - ‘any service normally provided for remuneration, at a distance, by electronic means and at the individual request of a recipient of services’.

(i) ‘at a distance’ refers to services provided without the parties being simultaneously present,

(ii) ‘by electronic means’ denotes services sent initially and received at its destination by means of electronic equipment for the processing (including digital compression) and storage of data, and entirely transmitted, conveyed and received by wire, by radio, by optical means or by other electromagnetic means and

(iii) ‘at the individual request of the recipient of the service’, as a service provided through the transmission of data on individual request.

== Other EU Directives regulating ISS ==
Directive 2006/123/EC of the European Parliament and of the Council of 12th December 2006 on services in the internal market.

Directive (EU) 2015/1535 of the European Parliament and of the Council of 9 September 2015 laying down a procedure for the provision of information in the field of technical regulations and of rules on Information Society services (OJ L 241, 17.9.2015, p. 1).

Digital Services Act (Act on digital services, focusing on users — consumers) in force from 17.2.2024.

Regulation (EU) 2022/1925 Digital Markets Act (DMA) (Act on digital markets, focusing on the relationship between online markets and platforms and professionals — suppliers of goods and services).

A clarification published by the Czech Ministry of Industry and Trade in September 2025 clearly states that platforms that set prices and assign drivers should be considered transport service providers, not information society intermediaries. In practice, when a platform is involved in organizing a trip and controls the vehicle and driver supply, it is legally classified as a transport operator and is required to comply with national licensing requirements. Since transport remains outside the scope of EU harmonized legislation, each Member State is free to establish its own regulatory and licensing requirements for such services.

== Court Cases Establishing ISS ==
=== European Union ===
Uber was considered not an ISS. Uber Systems Spain SL v. Asociacioón Profesional Elite Taxi (C-434/15) — on December 20, 2017, the CJEU ruled that Uber does not qualify as an ISS under Directive 2000/31/EC. Instead, Uber was classified as a transport service provider because it exercises significant control over drivers and the provision of transport services, including setting prices and service standards. This classification was based on Uber's role in managing and organizing transport activities, distinguishing it from digital intermediaries.

Star Taxi App was considered an ISS.Star Taxi App SRL v. Unitatea Administrativ Teritorială Râmnicu Vâlcea (Case C‑62/19) — on December 3, 2020, the CJEU ruled that the Star Taxi App, a platform connecting taxi drivers directly with passengers, is an ISS. The court determined that the app did not require a transport license as it merely facilitated connections without controlling the provision of transport services. This distinction highlighted the intermediary role of the service.

Airbnb was considered an ISS. Airbnb Ireland UC v. Hotelière Turenne SAS (C-390/18) — on December 19, 2019, the Court of Justice of the European Union (CJEU) ruled that Airbnb is classified as an ISS under Directive 2000/31/EC. The court determined that Airbnb provides an online platform facilitating transactions between property owners and potential renters without exercising control over the provision of accommodation services. This distinguishes it from traditional real estate agents, emphasizing its role as a digital intermediary.

Google's AdWords service was considered an ISS.Google France and Google Inc. v. Louis Vuitton Malletier (C-236/08, C-237/08, C-238/08) — on March 23, 2010, the CJEU ruled that Google's AdWords service is an ISS. The court decided that Google was not liable for trademark infringement for ads generated by users, provided it had not played an active role in creating the ads. This established the principle that ISS providers are not liable for user-generated content if they act as neutral intermediaries.

eBay was considered an ISS. L'Oréal SA v. eBay International AG (C-324/09) — on July 12, 2011, the CJEU ruled that eBay is an ISS. However, ISS providers like eBay could be held liable if they actively promoted illegal activities or had knowledge of such activities and failed to act. This case emphasized the balance between liability exemption for ISS providers and their responsibility to act against illegal activities on their platforms.

Iberia's online booking platform was considered an ISS. Asociación de Consumidores Independientes de Castilla y León v. Iberia Lineas Aéreas de España SA (C-413/12) — on December 19, 2013, the CJEU ruled that Iberia's online booking platform is an ISS. The platform facilitates the booking of flights by processing data electronically at the individual request of users, underscoring the application of ISS principles to online booking systems.

Evaluating credit risk was not considered an ISS. Asociación Nacional de Establecimientos Financieros de Crédito (ASNEF) and Federación de Comercio Electrónico y Marketing Directo (FECEMD) v. Administración del Estado (C-468/10 and C-469/10) — on November 24, 2011, the CJEU ruled that the processing of personal data by financial institutions for evaluating credit risk does not constitute an ISS. This is because it does not meet the criteria of being provided at a distance, by electronic means, and at the individual request of the recipient.

ISPs cannot be required to install general filtering systems and are considered ISS. Scarlet Extended SA v. Société belge des auteurs, compositeurs et éditeurs SCRL (SABAM) (C-70/10) — on November 24, 2011, the CJEU ruled that an ISP cannot be required to install a filtering system to prevent illegal file sharing, as it would violate the prohibition on imposing a general monitoring obligation on ISS providers. This case reinforced the principle that ISS providers should not be subject to general monitoring requirements.

Social networking services were considered ISS, with protections against general monitoring obligations. Netlog NV v. Belgische Vereniging van Auteurs, Componisten en Uitgevers CVBA (SABAM) (C-360/10) — on February 16, 2012, the CJEU ruled similarly to the Scarlet case, stating that social networking services are ISS and cannot be required to implement a general filtering system for user-uploaded content. This confirmed the limitations on the obligations that can be imposed on ISS providers regarding user-generated content.

Online versions of newspapers were considered ISS. Papasavvas v. O Fileleftheros Dimosia Etairia Ltd (C-291/13) — on September 11, 2014, the CJEU ruled that a newspaper's online version providing electronic services is an ISS. However, the case also highlighted that ISS providers can be liable for defamatory content if they do not act as neutral intermediaries.

Search engines were considered ISS providers. Google Spain SL and Google Inc. v. Agencia Española de Protección de Datos (AEPD) and Mario Costeja González (C-131/12) — on May 13, 2014, the CJEU ruled that search engines like Google are ISS providers and can be required to remove links to personal information upon request under certain conditions, establishing the "right to be forgotten". This case emphasized the responsibility of ISS providers to respect individuals' privacy rights.

=== UK ===
In 2021, a ruling by the High Court of Justice established that if a licensed operator accepts bookings for passenger transport, they act not only as an agent or intermediary between passengers and drivers but also as a contractor, meaning they are obligated to enter into a contract with the passenger to provide the journey that is the subject of the booking.

In November 2025, the UK government announced legislative changes to the application of the VAT Tour Operators’ Margin Scheme (TOMS) to taxi and private hire vehicle services. From 2 January 2026, suppliers of taxi and private hire journeys are excluded from the definition of a “tour operator” for TOMS purposes and must account for VAT under normal VAT rules, rather than on their margin. The change follows litigation concerning the scope of TOMS, including cases involving private hire vehicle operators, and is intended to provide legal certainty. An exception remains for journeys supplied as part of a wider travel package where the taxi or private hire service is ancillary to accommodation or certain other passenger transport services.

=== USA ===
Treatment and rights of gig economy workers and the responsibilities of digital platforms Uber (not EU ISS) and Lyft — settlement in Massachusetts — in June 2024, Uber and Lyft reached a settlement with the Massachusetts Attorney General, agreeing to pay their drivers a minimum of $32.50 per hour while en route to pick up passengers or actively transporting them. This settlement resolved longstanding litigation concerning alleged violations of state wage and hour laws. Additionally, the settlement included benefits such as paid sick leave, occupational accident insurance, and health care stipends.

Under the agreement, Uber and Lyft were required to pay a combined $175 million to the state, with a substantial portion distributed to current and former drivers. The settlement also stipulated that the companies must update their driver applications to allow drivers to view and claim their sick leave directly through the app. Furthermore, drivers who work more than 15 hours per week for either or both companies can pool their hours to obtain a health insurance stipend. The case addressed the classification of gig economy workers and the obligations of digital platforms in ensuring fair wages and benefits. It also prevented the companies from pursuing a proposed ballot initiative that would have classified drivers as independent contractors with fewer protections.

In August 2024, a $250 million wrongful death lawsuit was filed in the United States District Court in Massachusetts following a fatal limousine-related traffic accident that occurred in January 2024 on Interstate 91 in Connecticut. The case involves the death of Paula Garcia Franks, a Massachusetts resident who was killed when the uninsured vehicle in which she was a passenger was rear-ended by a tractor-trailer while traveling from JFK Airport to her home.

The lawsuit names multiple defendants, including the limousine driver, the transportation company that arranged the ride, and several commercial trucking entities, alleging negligence, lack of required insurance coverage, and violations of state and federal transportation regulations. The case has drawn attention to broader issues surrounding uninsured for-hire passenger carriers, commercial vehicle safety standards, and regulatory oversight in interstate transportation within the United States.

== See also ==
- EU law
- UK enterprise law
