= XNXX =

Czech-pornographic website

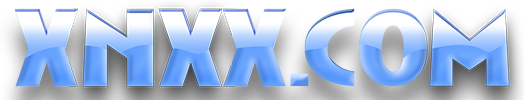
- Website type: Pornographic video sharing
- Founded: 1997; 29 years ago
- Country of origin: France
- Owner: WGCZ Holding
- Founder: Stephane Michael Pacaud
- Website: xnxx.com
- Advertising: Yes
- Commercial: Yes
- Registration: Optional
- Current status: Active

XNXX is a Czech–French pornographic video sharing and viewing website. It was founded in 1997 in Paris, with servers and offices in Montreal, Tokyo and Newark. It is owned by WGCZ Holding, the same company that runs XVideos. As of February 2026, it is the 44th-most-visited website in the world and the fourth most-visited pornography website after Pornhub, xHamster, and XVideos.

== History ==
WGCZ's ownership was first revealed in 2014 when WGCZ brought a Uniform Domain-Name Dispute-Resolution Policy case against a similar domain in 2014.

In 2018, the Government of India blocked XNXX, among other porn websites, after a Uttarakhand High Court court order demanding the same in a rape case where the perpetrators stated they were motivated to do so after watching online pornography.

In January 2023, the Financial Times reported that WGCZ tube sites XVideos and XNXX received 6 billion visits a month.

== See also ==
- List of most-visited websites
- Pornhub

== Notes ==
- Mazières, Antoine; Trachman, Mathieu; Cointet, Jean-Philippe; Coulmont, Baptiste; Prieur, Christophe (21 March 2014). "Deep tags: toward a quantitative analysis of online pornography" (PDF). Porn Studies. 1 (1–2). Routledge: 80–95. doi:10.1080/23268743.2014.888214. S2CID 38282677.
- Sullivan, Rebecca; McKee, Alan (2015). Pornography: Structures, Agency and Performance. Cambridge: John Wiley & Sons. ISBN 978-0745694849.
- Stecklow, Steve (17 September 2010). "On the Web, Children Face Intensive Tracking". The Wall Street Journal.
- 90 percent of the pornographic videos hosted by the four most visited sites in France - Pornhub, HVideos, Xnxx and Xhamster - feature real acts of physical, sexual or verbal violence against women. by Anna Fleck, October 5, 2023 Statista
