= Thomas Sjöberg (journalist) =

Swedish journalist

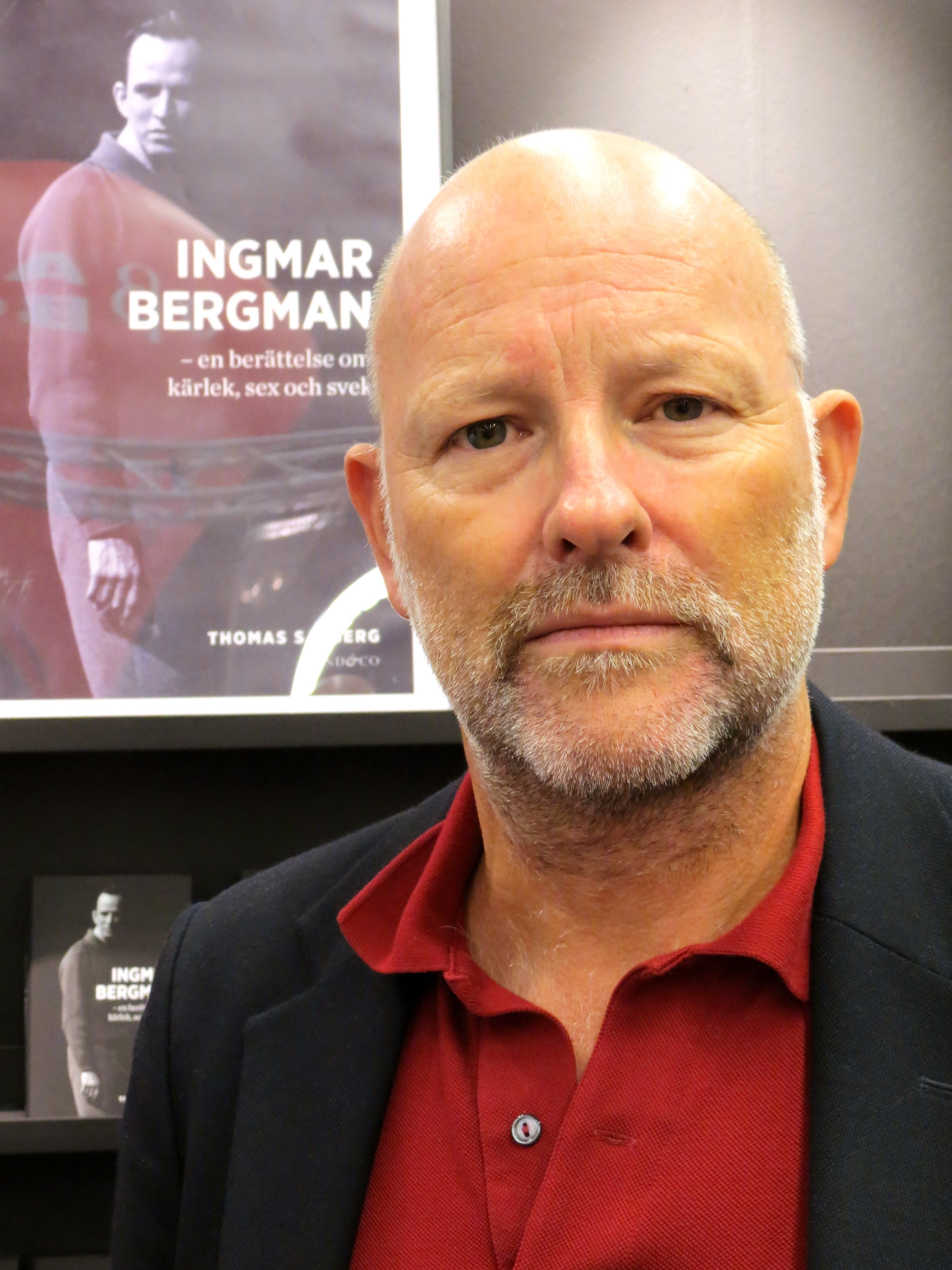
Thomas Sjöberg

Thomas Sjöberg, born 1958 in Sweden, is a journalist and author based in Stockholm.

He began his career as journalist in the late 1970s and for several years filled in for others in contributing articles to newspapers such as Expressen, Aftonbladet, Sydsvenska Dagbladet, and Dagens Nyheter. In the mid-1980s he switched to freelance employment and worked for, among others, Nöjesguiden and Elle. He made himself above all known as a writer of personal profiles and wrote a number of notable articles on people such as Berth Milton, Ingmar Bergman, Pierre Schori, Sven-Göran Eriksson, and Lennart Hyland.

Sjöberg has taught biographical journalism and contributed to Swedish television. In the first decade of the 21st century Sjöberg was editor for Scanorama, the in-flight magazine published by the Scandinavian Airline SAS.

Sjöberg has also written several books (see below), the most controversial of which was Carl XVI Gustaf: Den motvillige monarken (Carl XVI Gustaf: The Unwilling Monarch), which alleged that the Swedish king had frequented strip clubs managed by the Mafia. The book was assailed not only for probing into the royal family (traditionally a tabooed subject in Sweden) but also for questions about the anonymity and credibility of the sources. Nonetheless, the book became a national bestseller and in 2013 it was shortlisted by the Association for Investigative Journalism in Sweden as one of the most important revelations the last 25 years.

== Books ==
Sjöberg, Thomas. (1996). Tommy Lindström: Mitt liv som snut (Tommy Lindström: My Life as a Cop). ISBN 91-7964-230-6.
Sjöberg, Thomas. (1998). Ingvar Kamprad och hans IKEA: en svensk saga (Ingvar Kamprad and His IKEA: A Swedish Story) ISBN 91-7964-251-9.
Sjöberg, Thomas. (2002). Private med Milton och Milton (Private with Milton and Milton). ISBN 91-7054-887-0.
Sjöberg, Thomas. (2005). Barnflickan i Knutby: dramadokumentär (The Nanny in Knutby: A Documentary Drama). ISBN 91-46-21146-2.
Sjöberg, Thomas. (2010). Carl XVI Gustaf: Den motvillige monarken (Carl XVI Gustaf: The Unwilling Monarch). ISBN 978-91-7461-016-1.

Sjöberg, Thomas (2013). Ingmar Bergman – En berättelse om kärlek, sex och svek ISBN 978-91-7461-203-5
