= Bang Bros =

American pornographic film studio

BangBros.com
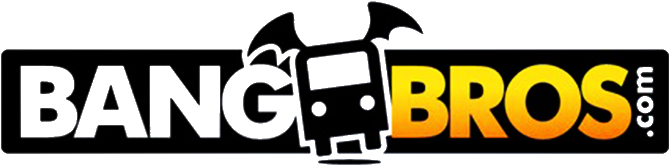
- Website type: Pornography
- Available in: English, Polish, Spanish, Afrikaans, Turkish, Japanese, German, Russian, Chinese, Macedonian, Greek, Ukrainian, Balochi, Arabic, Bulgarian, Hindi
- Headquarters: Miami, Florida, U.S.
- Owner: WGCZ Holding
- Website: Official website
- Registration: Optional (previews only)
- Launched: March 1, 2002; 24 years ago
- Current status: Active

Bang Bros (stylized BangBros) is an independent pornographic film studio operating from Miami, Florida, United States. The network is now owned by WGCZ Holding, a Czech company based in Nové Město district of Prague, which purchased the network and its associated websites in 2017.

Bang Bros operates a network of 60 websites as of June 2018.

== History ==
Bang Bros rose to prominence with its flagship sites Bangbus.com and Assparade.com. Along with multiple paysites, they also owned and operated the popular camming websites Camster.com and Naked.com, which were sold off in 2019.

In 2014, they completed the purchase of the popular amateur pornographic film studio Girls Gone Wild.

In 2019, Bang Bros completed the purchase of PornWikiLeaks.com. PornWikiLeaks.com was known for publishing the real names and information of actresses and actors within the pornography industry. When Bang Bros took control of the data and domain, they immediately destroyed and wiped all information associated with the site, which helped to protect associated workers in the pornography industry.

On September 15, 2019, Bang Bros made an offer to the Miami Heat to get the naming rights to the arena in which they play. The new name suggested was the Bang Bros Center (BBC). The company re-submitted a bid to sponsor the stadium in exchange for naming rights in November 2022, after the collapse of FTX, the former sponsor of the stadium.

Bang Bros used to operate a Spanish-language service based out of Colombia called "Culioneros", which taped on location and had local versions of their own productions like their "bang bus".

== Legal issues ==
BangBros.com, Inc. was sued by the U.S. government in June 2005 for violating the Federal Trade Commission (FTC) Adult Labeling Rule and Federal CAN-SPAM Act. The company failed to follow the rule that requires commercial e-mailers of sexually explicit material to use the phrase "sexually explicit" in the subject line. The company settled the lawsuit for $650,000, and also agreed to allow its operations to be monitored to ensure future compliance.

== Awards ==
- 2010 XBIZ Award: Gonzo series of the year: Big Tits Round Asses
- 2011 XBIZ Award: Studio Affiliate Program of the Year
- 2012 XBIZ Award: Amateur Release of the Year
- 2013 XBIZ Award Nominee: Studio of the Year
- 2013 XBIZ Award: Adult Site of the Year
- 2015 XBIZ Award: Gonzo Series of the Year: Bang Bus
- 2006 AVN Award: Best Amateur Release / BangBus 6
- 2006 AVN Award: Best Amateur Series / BangBus
- 2007 AVN Award: Best Amateur Release / BangBus 9
- 2008 AVN Award: Best Gonzo Series / BangBus
- 2009 AVN Award: Best Pro Am Series / BangBus
- 2010 AVN Award: Best Pro Am Release / BangBus 24
- 2010 AVN Award: Best Adult Website / BangBros.com
- 2014 AVN Award: Best Pro Am Series / BangBus
- 2016 AVN Award: Best Amateur / ProAm Series / BangBus
