= Private Media Group =

Swedish production and distribution company

- Industry: Publishing
- Genre: Adult online movies, DVDs, and magazines
- Founded: 1965; 61 years ago (as Private Magazine); Stockholm, Sweden
- Founder: Berth Milton Sr.
- Headquarters: Ireland
- Area served: Worldwide
- Products: DVDs, magazines, licensing, online dating service, movies, sex toys
- Number of employees: 38 (2013)
- Website: prvt.com private.com

Private Media Group, Inc. is a Swedish production and distribution company that distributes adult entertainment via print publications, DVDs, and the Internet. It first published a magazine called Private in Stockholm in 1965. Private Media Group was purchased in 2019 by WGCZ Holding, the owner of XVideos.

== Origins ==
Private magazine was established in Stockholm, Sweden, in 1965 as the world's first full-color hardcore magazine by Berth Milton Sr. In the early 1990s, his son Berth Milton Jr. took over and started to produce movies and internet content, taking Private public soon after.

== Product lines ==
The firm provides content through DVD, Video on Demand (VOD), Internet Protocol television (IPTV), PSP, mobile and magazines. It supplies adult entertainment films to thousands of major hotels around the world through their Hotel Pay Per View services. The company also runs the adult channels Private TV (Europe) and Private Gold (Latin America)

In 1998 the company launched Private Circle, a designer clothing label, at the Cannes Film Festival. The label would later be changed to Private Clothing and a boutique would be opened in Los Angeles.

In August 2008 Private Media Group announced it had established an alliance with Marc Dorcel to collaborate in the home video market. The collaboration started with a three-year DVD distribution agreement for France.

The firm's 2009 acquisitions of video on demand companies Gamelink LLC and Sureflix, and the ecommerce technology firm eLine LLC established it as a leading adult content and distribution company in the digital media sector.

In June 2014 the firm announced the released of its full archive of images and (film and video) scenes dating back to the 1960s when Private magazine launched in Sweden. The material is available via a website, PrivateClassics.com.

== Movies ==
Private is known for high-budget, adult movies, such as the two-part series Millionaire, directed by Alessandro del Mar, with a reported budget of $1.9 million. In the last few decades, Private has earned more than 130 adult industry awards. The film Millionaire alone earned 16 Venus Award nominations in 2004. Best-selling releases include the Private Gladiator series, Cleopatra, Millionaire and Chateau.

In 1999, Private released The Uranus Experiment, a three-part pornographic science fiction video that is notable for part of it having been shot in microgravity during a parabolic flight, representing the first time a sex act had been carried out in zero-g conditions.

=== Awards ===
The following is a selection of some of the major awards Private films have won:

- 1994 AVN Award – Best Foreign Feature (Private Video Magazine 1)
- 1995 AVN Award – Best Counting Video Series (Private Video Magazine)
- 1995 AVN Award – Best Foreign Feature (Virgin Treasures 1 & 2)
- 1996 AVN Award – Best Foreign Feature (The Tower, Parts 1, 2 & 3)
- 1996 AVN Award – Most Outrageous Sex Scene (Private Video Magazine 20)
- 1997 AVN Award – Best Foreign Feature (The Pyramid, Parts 1, 2 & 3)
- 1998 AVN Award – Best Foreign Feature (The Fugitive 1 & 2)
- 1999 AVN Award – Best Foreign Feature (Tatiana 1, 2 & 3)
- 2000 AVN Award – Best Foreign Feature (Amanda's Diary 2)
- 2001 AVN Award – Best Foreign Vignette Series (Private XXX)
- 2003 AVN Award – Best Foreign Feature (Private Gladiator)
- 2004 AVN Award – Best Foreign Feature (The Scottish Loveknot)
- 2006 AVN Award – Best Foreign Feature (Robinson Crusoe on Sin Island)
- 2007 AVN Award – Best Foreign Feature (Porn Wars: Episode 1)
- 2007 Eroticline Award - Best European Film (The Sexual Adventures of Little Red)
- 2009 AVN Award – Best BDSM Release (House of Sex and Domination)
- 2009 AVN Award – Best Foreign Feature (Jason Colt, Mystery of the Sexy Diamonds)
- 2017 VENUS Award – Best International Label
