= Penthouse (magazine) =

Erotic magazine

- Cover of the February 1980 issue, Debbie Harry by Mick Rock
- Categories: Pornographic
- Frequency: Monthly (1965–2018); Bi-monthly (2019–2023); Monthly (2024–present)
- Total circulation: 4.7 million (1979)
- Founder: Bob Guccione
- First issue: March 1965; 61 years ago (United Kingdom); September 1969; 57 years ago (United States)
- Company: General Media Inc. (1965–2004); Friend Finder Networks (2004–2016); Kelly Holland (2016–2018); WGCZ Holding (2018–present)
- Country: United Kingdom
- Based in: Los Angeles, California, United States
- Language: English
- Website: penthouse.com
- ISSN: 0090-2020

Penthouse (stylised in all caps; incorporating Penthouse Letters) is an American monthly digital pornographic magazine that covers sex, entertainment, technology, and lifestyle. Founded by Bob Guccione in 1965, under his control through General Media Inc. until 2004, after which the company was acquired by PET Capital Partners and renamed Penthouse Media Group (later rebranded to Friend Finder Networks). In 2016 it was acquired by Kelly Holland through Penthouse Global Media and since 2018 Penthouse is under the control of WGCZ Holding, operated through Penthouse World Media.

Penthouse began publication from London in March 1965. The American edition began publication from September 1969 and became the flagship edition. In the United States, Penthouse ceased print publication with its 2023 anniversary issue, transitiong to digital issues incorporating Penthouse Letters from 2024. A print revival was announced in 2024 and again confirmed in early 2026.

== History ==
=== The Guccione Era (1965–2004) ===
Penthouse began publication in the United Kingdom in March 1965. The magazine began on a small budget and it took twenty months to produce the first twelve monthly issues. However by the late 1960s, according to Dian Hanson it was "the best-selling erotic magazine in Europe", notably with high sales in France and its UK target market. Reports of the magazine outselling Playboy among American troops in Vietnam inspired Guccione to launch an American edition, with the first issue appearing in September 1969.

The September 1984 issue of Penthouse magazine would eventually become controversial because of its centerfold, Traci Lords. Lords posed nude for this issue at the beginning of her career as an adult film star. It was later revealed that Lords was underage throughout most of her career in pornography and was only 16 when she posed for Penthouse. The same issue also caused controversy with nude pictures of Vanessa Williams that caused her to be stripped of her Miss America crown.

In 1997, Penthouse changed its format and began featuring sexually explicit pictures (i.e., actual oral, vaginal, and anal penetration), beginning with photos from the Stolen Honeymoon sex tape featuring Pamela Anderson and Tommy Lee. It also began to regularly feature pictorials of female models urinating, which, until then, had been considered a defining limit of illegal obscenity as distinguished from legal pornography. Following these editorial changes advertising revenue declined and the magazine entered a period of decline.

In 1999, hoping to raise cash and reduce debt, Penthouse sold several automotive magazine titles from its large portfolio Peterson Automotive, raising $33 million in cash. However, two of their retained publications, science and health magazines Omni and Longevity lost almost $100 million, contributing to further financial problems.

In April 2002, Guccione stated that the magazine had grossed from $3.5 billion to $4 billion since launch.

On August 12, 2003, General Media, the parent company of the magazine, filed for Chapter 11 bankruptcy protection. Immediately upon filing, Cerberus Capital Management entered into a $5 million debtor-in-possession credit line with General Media to provide working capital. In October 2003, Penthouse magazine was put up for sale as part of a deal with its creditors. On November 13, 2004, Guccione resigned as chairman and CEO of Penthouse International, the parent of General Media.

=== Post-Guccione (2004–2018) ===
Starting with the January 2005 issue, the new owners significantly softened the content of the magazine. Penthouse no longer showed male genitalia, real or simulated male-female sex, nor any form of explicit hardcore content. While this change was followed by the return of a limited number of mainstream advertisers to the magazine, it did not significantly raise the number of subscribers; total circulation was still below 350,000.

In 2006, Guccione sued Penthouse Media Group for fraud, breach of contract, and conspiracy, among other charges. People named in the case include Marc Bell, Jason Galanis, Fernando Molina, Charles Samel, and Daniel C. Stanton.

Penthouse filed for bankruptcy protection on September 17, 2013. The magazine's then-owner Friend Finder Networks current common stock was wiped out and was no longer traded on the open market. In August 2013, FriendFinder's stock was delisted from Nasdaq.

The first American issue of Penthouse, September 1969

In January 2016 it was widely reported that Penthouse was ceasing print publication. The company quickly clarified that this was not the case, blaming a "weakly crafted press release" for the confusion. In fact the difference between the two announcements was semantic. The first had said print would end when the transition to digital was complete; the second said the print edition would continue as long as it was profitable, which did not necessarily guarantee it a longer life.

In February 2016, Penthouse Global Media (led by Penthouse Entertainment managing director Kelly Holland) acquired the brand from Friend Finder Networks. Holland overhauled the brand and properties, with guidance from publisher of Australian Penthouse, Damien Costas who had repositioned the Australian edition from adult content toward commentary on cultural and political issues after acquiring the title in 2013.

=== Under WGCZ Holding (2018–present) ===
Penthouse Global Media filed for Chapter 11 bankruptcy on January 11, 2018, to address debt-related issues. The company was acquired on June 4, 2018 for US$11.2 million by WGCZ Ltd, beating bids from Pornhub and Hustler.

The last print issue to appear was the 2023 anniversary issue (September), previously the number of issues per year dropped to eleven in 2009, to ten in 2017, and to six in 2019 (there were only five issues in 2020). A digital-only "annual" appeared at the end of 2023, followed by the launch of digital-only monthly Penthouse with Penthouse Letters.

In September 2024, Penthouse World Media stated that it would continue to produce print magazines and that new publication schedules for Penthouse and Penthouse Letters would be revealed by the end of 2024. These plans did not eventuate, however in early 2026 that it was stated that "plans for a return to print are still in the works".

== Contributors and style ==
Guccione offered editorial content that was more sensational than that of Playboy, and the magazine's writing was far more investigative than Hefner's upscale emphasis, with stories about government cover-ups and scandals. Writers such as Seymour Hersh, James Dale Davidson, and Ernest Volkman exposed numerous scandals and corruption at the highest levels of the United States Government. Contributors to the magazine included Isaac Asimov, James Baldwin, Howard Blum, Victor Bockris, T. C. Boyle, Alexander Cockburn, Harry Crews, Cameron Crowe, Don DeLillo, Alan Dershowitz, Edward Jay Epstein, Chet Flippo, Albert Goldman, Anthony Haden-Guest, John Hawkes, Nat Hentoff, Warren Hinckle, Abbie Hoffman, Nicholas von Hoffman, Michael Korda, Paul Krassner, Michael Ledeen, Anthony Lewis, Joyce Carol Oates, James Purdy, Philip Roth, Harrison E. Salisbury, Gail Sheehy, Robert Sherrill, Mickey Spillane, Ben Stein, Harry Stein, Tad Szulc, Studs Terkel, Nick Tosches, Gore Vidal, Irving Wallace, and Dr. Ruth Westheimer.

Due to Guccione's lack of resources, he personally photographed most of the models for the magazine's early issues. Without professional training, Guccione applied his knowledge of painting to his photography, establishing the diffused, soft focus look that would become one of the trademarks of the magazine's pictorials. Guccione would sometimes take several days to complete a shoot.

The magazine's pictorials offered more sexually explicit content than what was commonly seen in most openly sold men's magazines of the era. It was the first to show female pubic hair, followed by full-frontal nudity, and eventually, the exposed vulva and anus. Penthouse has also featured a number of authorized and unauthorized photos of celebrities, such as Madonna and Vanessa Williams. In both cases, the photos were taken earlier in their careers and sold to Penthouse only after Madonna and Williams became famous.

=== Skeleton key symbol ===
The magazine's symbol is a skeleton key, or three keys for the Penthouse Clubs.

=== Editors (United States) ===
Editor	Start year	End year
Bob Guccione	1969	2004
Peter Bloch		
Barbara Rice Thompson		
Mish Barber-Way	2017	2020
Damien Costas	2020	2021
Corrine Barraclough	2021	
Aaron Solorzano		
Moose		2023

== Influence and reception ==
In 1975, Guccione was honored by Brandeis University for focusing "his editorial attention on such critical issues of our day as the welfare of the Vietnam veteran and problems of criminality in modern society".

In March 1975, Penthouse published an article headlined "La Costa: The Hundred-Million-Dollar Resort with Criminal Clientele", written by Jeff Gerth and Lowell Bergman. The article indicated that the La Costa Resort and Spa in Carlsbad, California, was developed by Mervyn Adelson and Irwin Molasky using loans from the Teamsters Pension Fund and that the resort was a playground for organized crime figures. The owners, along with two officials of the resort, Morris B. Moe Dalitz and Allard Roen, filed a libel lawsuit for $522 million against the magazine and the writers. In 1982, a jury absolved the magazine of any liability against the lawsuit from the owners. The plaintiffs appealed, but in December 1985, before a new trial could begin, the two sides settled. Penthouse issued a statement that they did not mean to imply that Adelson and Molaskey are or were members of organized crime. In turn the plaintiffs issued a statement lauding Penthouse publisher Guccione and his magazine for their "personal and professional awards". Total litigation costs were estimated to exceed $20 million.

In December 1984, a group of radical feminists began a civil disobedience campaign against Penthouse which they called a National Rampage. Led by Melissa Farley and Nikki Craft, they went into stores selling copies of the magazine and ripped them up, and they also burned an effigy of Bob Guccione in front of a bookstore in Madison, Wisconsin. In late 1985 the group began to focus on the printer of Penthouse, Meredith Corporation. They bought shares in the company and attended their annual stockholder's meeting. The women were not allowed to speak, but they removed their coats, revealing images from a Penthouse shoot about Japanese rope bondage—among which two poses were construed by Farley to evoke dead bodies—ironed onto [their] shirts.

== International editions ==
=== Operating ===
==== Print ====
- Penthouse Deutschland (for Germany; since 1980, originally published as Penthouse Deutsche Ausgabe)

==== Digital ====
- Penthouse (for the United States; since 1969)

=== Defunct ===
- Penthouse Australia & NZ (for Australia and New Zealand; from 1984 to 2022, as Australian Penthouse until 2014)
- De Belgische Penthouse (for Belgium; from 1986)
- Penthouse Brasil (for Brazil; from 1982)
- Penthouse България (for Bulgaria, from 2010)
- Penthouse Canada (for Canada)
- Penthouse (for Croatia)
- Penthouse Edition Française (for France; from 1985 to 1998, 2001 to 2002)
- ελληνικά Penthouse (for Greece)
- Penthouse Hong Kong (for Hong Kong)
- Penthouse Magyarország (for Hungary; from 1989/1990)
- Penthouse Edizione Italiana (for Italy)
- Penthouse 日本版 (for Japan)
- Penthouse México (for Mexico)
- De Nederlandse Penthouse (for The Netherlands; from 1986 to 2013)
- Penthouse Portugal (for Portugal; from 2010 to 2013)
- Penthouse Русское издание (for Russia; from 1992)
- Penthouse España (for Spain; from 1978 to 2012)
- Thai Penthouse (for Thailand; from 1994 to 2019)
- Penthouse (for the United Kingdom; from 1965 to 1999, 2001 to 2006, 2007 to 2007)

=== United Kingdom ===
In 1997 in an attempt to restore sales under the editorship of Tom Hilditch, the magazine was rebranded as PH.UK and relaunched as middle-shelf "adult magazine for grown-ups". Fashion photographers (such as Corinne Day of The Face magazine) were hired to produce images that merged sex and fashion. The magazine's editorial content included celebrity interviews and tackled issues of sexual politics. The experiment attracted a great deal of press interest, but failed to generate a significant increase in sales. The magazine ceased publication in late 1998

== Other editions ==
- Penthouse Comics (1994–1998; 2024–present)
- Penthouse Forum (1968–2016)
- Girls of Penthouse (1977–2016)
- Penthouse Letters (–2023)
- Penthouse Photo World (1976–1977)
- Penthouse Variations
- Longevity (1989–)
- Omni (1978–1997)
- Viva (1973–1980)

== Other ventures ==
- Caligula
- Chinatown
- Penthouse Club (Australia: Perth United States: Baltimore, Baton Rouge, New Orleans, Tampa; Previously, France: Paris Mexico: Mexico City New Zealand: Auckland Russia: Moscow Ukraine: Kharkiv United Kingdom: London United States: Atlanta, Dallas, Denver, Detroit, Houston, Los Angeles, Myrtle Beach, New York City, Niagara Falls, Philadelphia, Pittsburgh, San Francisco, Spartanburg, St. Louis Yugoslavia: Malinska)

== See also ==
- Pubic Wars
