= Berth Milton Jr. =

Swedish businessman (born 1955)

Berth Milton Jr. (born 1955) is a Swedish businessman. He is the majority owner of Private Media Group, one of the leading producers and distributors of pornography, founded by his father, Berth Milton Sr. Milton is estimated to own a majority of the company's stock.

Like his father, Milton proved to be an accomplished businessman and made a small fortune on various investments ranging in everything from a gym and tanning salon in Stockholm to various imports of everything from pantyhose to wristwatches as well as real estate deals in Spain. Milton himself has described his upbringing by his father as harsh and loveless, and though he vowed never to get into the porn business, he eventually took over Private Media Group in 1991.

Since his takeover, Milton has expanded the company into videos and DVDs, and established websites. He has also overseen licensing the company's name for commercial products, including condoms.

The lives and careers of Milton Sr. and Jr. have been the topic of the biography Private med Milton och Milton ("Private with Milton and Milton") by the Swedish journalist Thomas Sjöberg.

In 2007, the shareholders of Private Media group filed a lawsuit against Mr Milton Jr. The suit cited the improperly borrowing of more than $10 million, Private Media Group paying personal legal bills in his fight with Swedish tax authorities, and awarding himself a salary of $600,000 without board approval.

He lives in Mauritius with his three children but spends a lot of time in Spain.

He has one of the largest tax-debts in Swedish history to the Swedish tax authorities. The amount is SEK 462,056,863 (€46 million). The debt was supposedly about to be written off in its entirety on 1st of January 2020. However, the authorities made an extension to the debt until the year 2025.

One of his latest business ventures, CokoAkvo, which produced and distributed a coconut water drink, resulted in a failure.

An intimate documentary about the life and business of Berth Milton and Private was produced by Airborne TV and Channel Five – The Reluctant Porn King.
