= GayVN Award for Best Actor =

Gay pornographic film award category

- GayVN award for contributions of actors to pornography
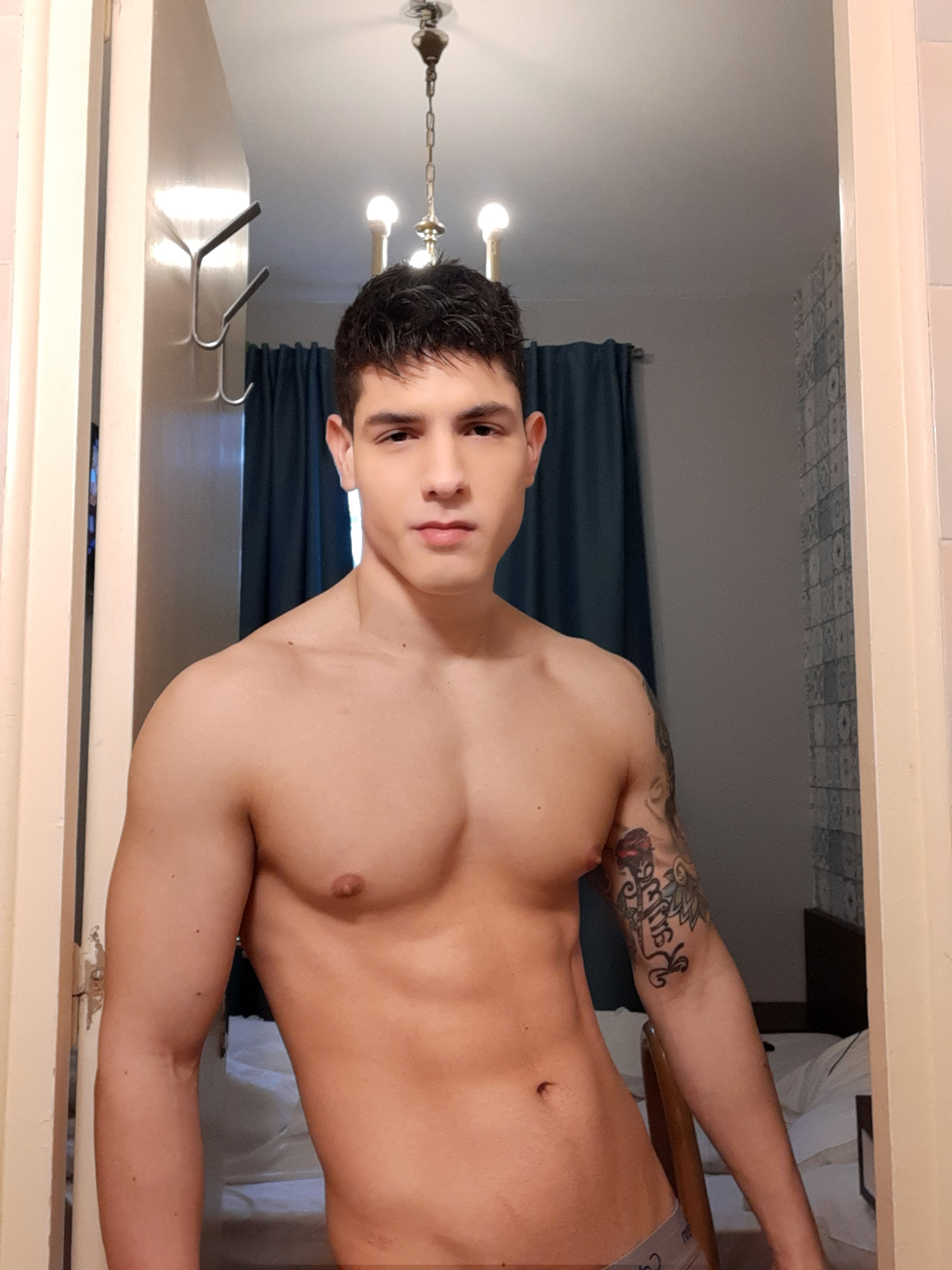
- The 2025 recipient: Bastian Karim
- Awarded for: Best performance by a gay porn actor in a leading role
- Sponsored by: AVN
- Location: Las Vegas
- Country: USA
- Presented by: AVN Media Network
- First award: 1998; 28 years ago
- Most recent winner: Paddy O'Brian; To the Nines (2026)

Highlights
- Most awards: Tony Donovan (2)
- Total awarded: 24
- First winner: Vince Rockland; Three Brothers (1998)
- Website: avn.com/gayvnawards

The GayVN Award for Best Actor is an award presented annually by AVN Media Network at the GayVN Awards, given to a gay porn actor for the "most outstanding acting performance in a principal role including at least one sex scene within a full-length or longer narrative work".

Initially, achievements in gay pornography were recognized by AVN Media Network at the AVN Awards, until the creation of the GayVN Awards. The 1st GayVN Awards ceremony was held in 1998, with Vince Rockland receiving the award for his performance in Three Brothers. The second ceremony was held in 2000, with the GayVN Awards taking place annually until 2010. Following this the GayVN Awards would enter a seven-year hiatus, coming back in 2018.

Since its inception, the award has been given to 24 actors. With two wins, Tony Donovan is the only actor to have won this award more than once, as well as the only one to achieve two consecutive wins. DeAngelo Jackson is the only man of color to win in this category, for Blended Family in 2020. As of the 2026 ceremony, the most recent recipient is Paddy O'Brian for To the Nines.

== Winners and nominees ==
Table key
‡	Indicates the winner

=== 1990s ===
1990s winners and nominees
Award year	Actor	Film	Studio	Ref(s).
1998 (1st)	Vince Rockland ‡	Three Brothers	New Age Pictures	

=== 2000s ===
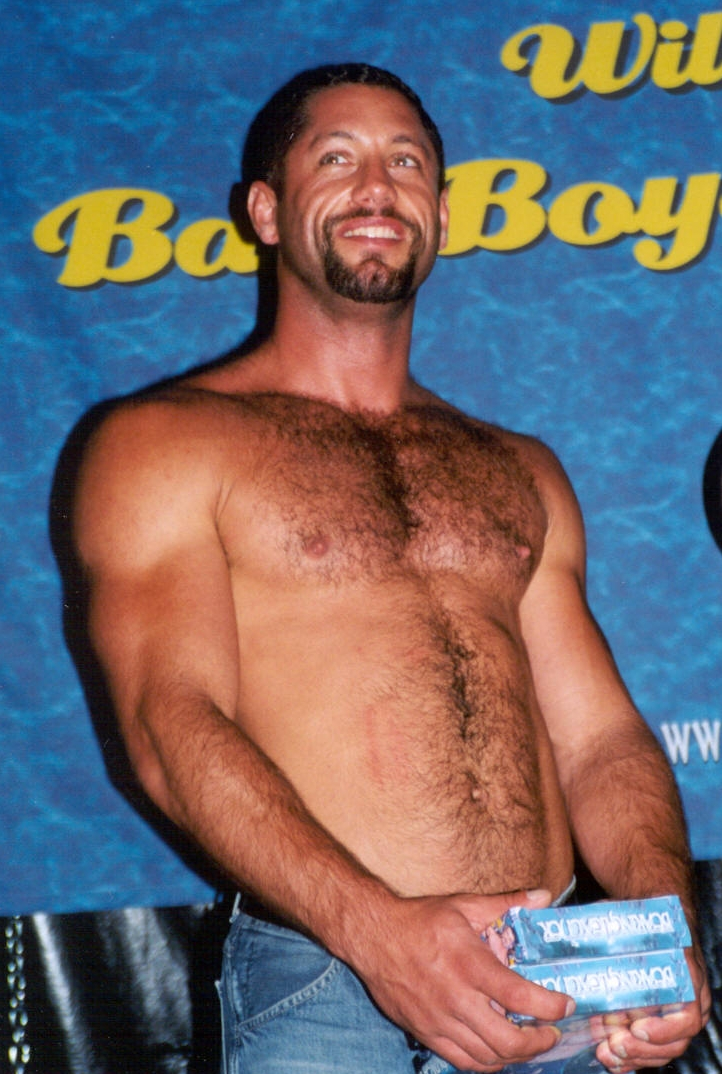
Blake Harper won for Animus in 2000.

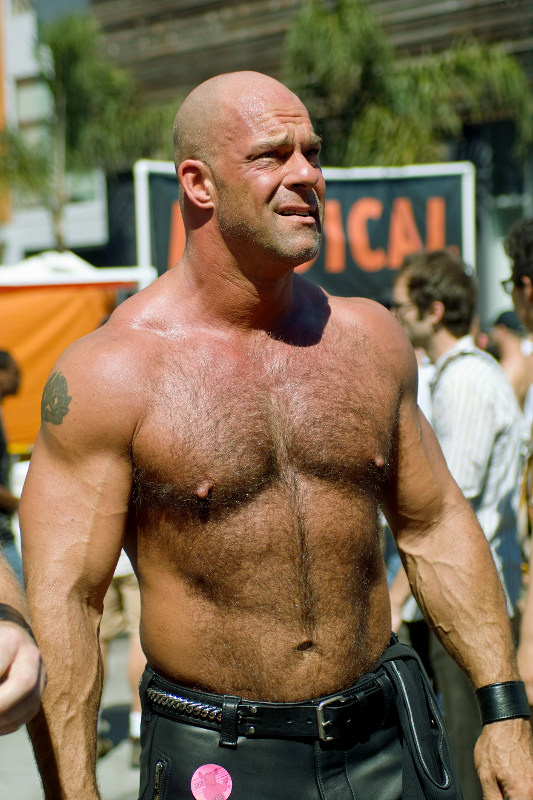
Zak Spears won for The Joint in 2002.

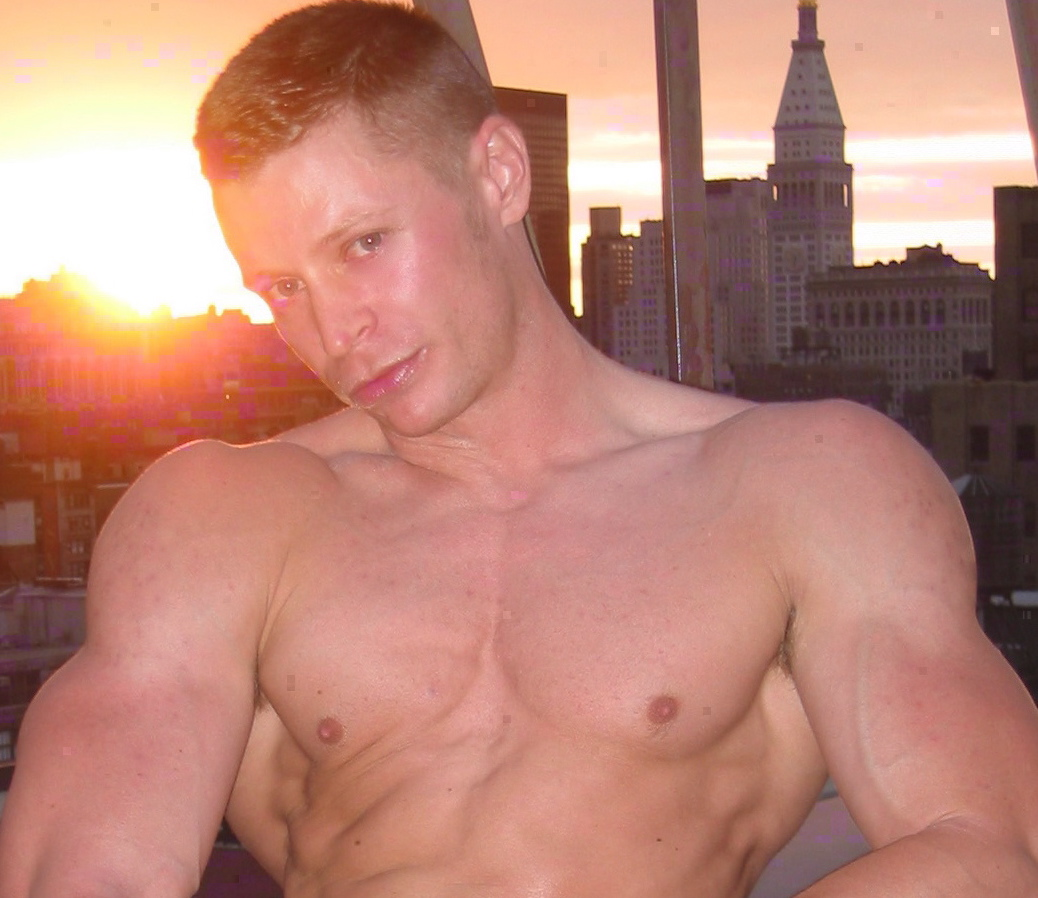
Josh Weston won for Deep South: The Big and the Easy in 2003.

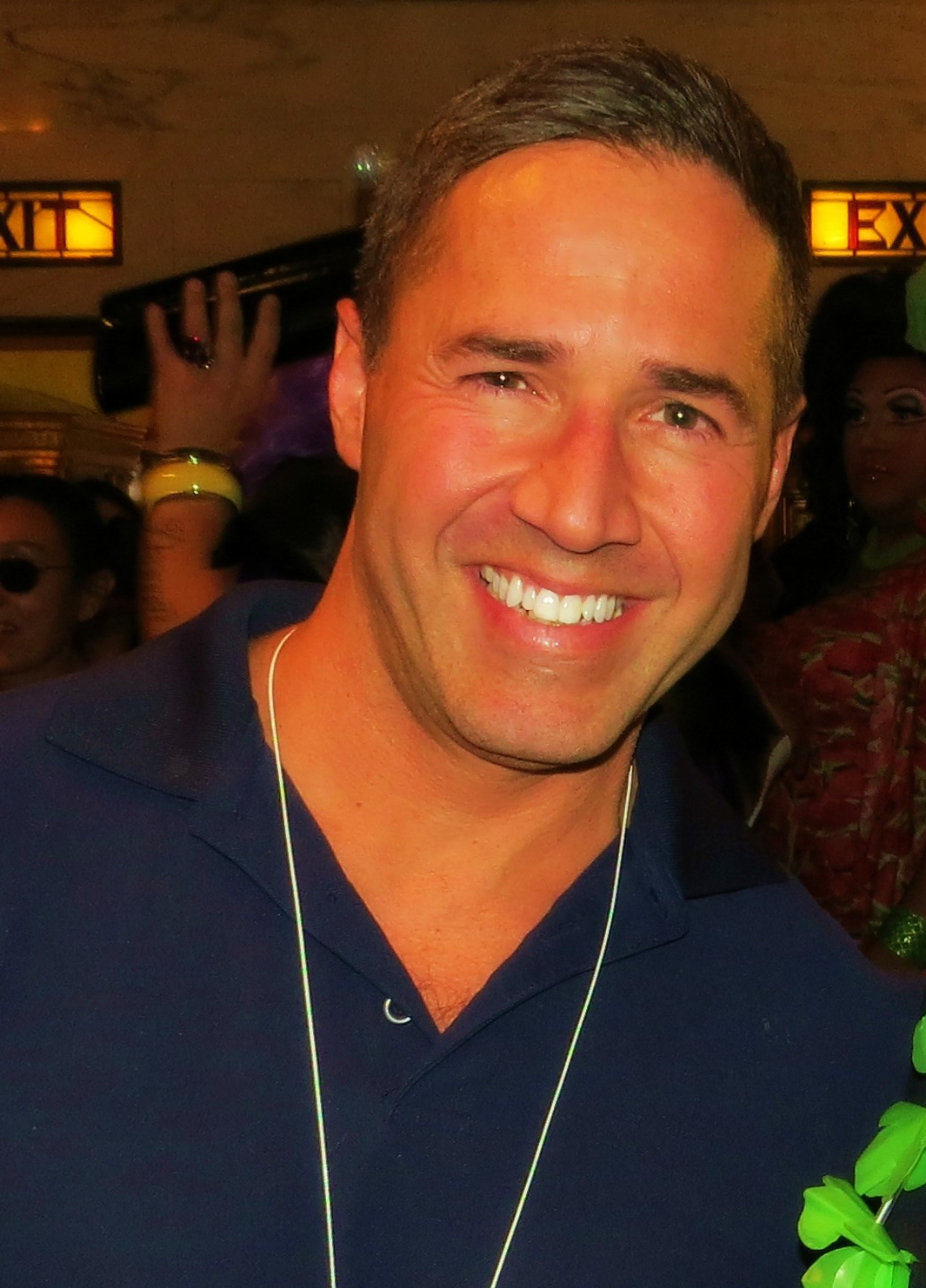
Dean Phoenix won for BuckleRoos 1–2 in 2005.

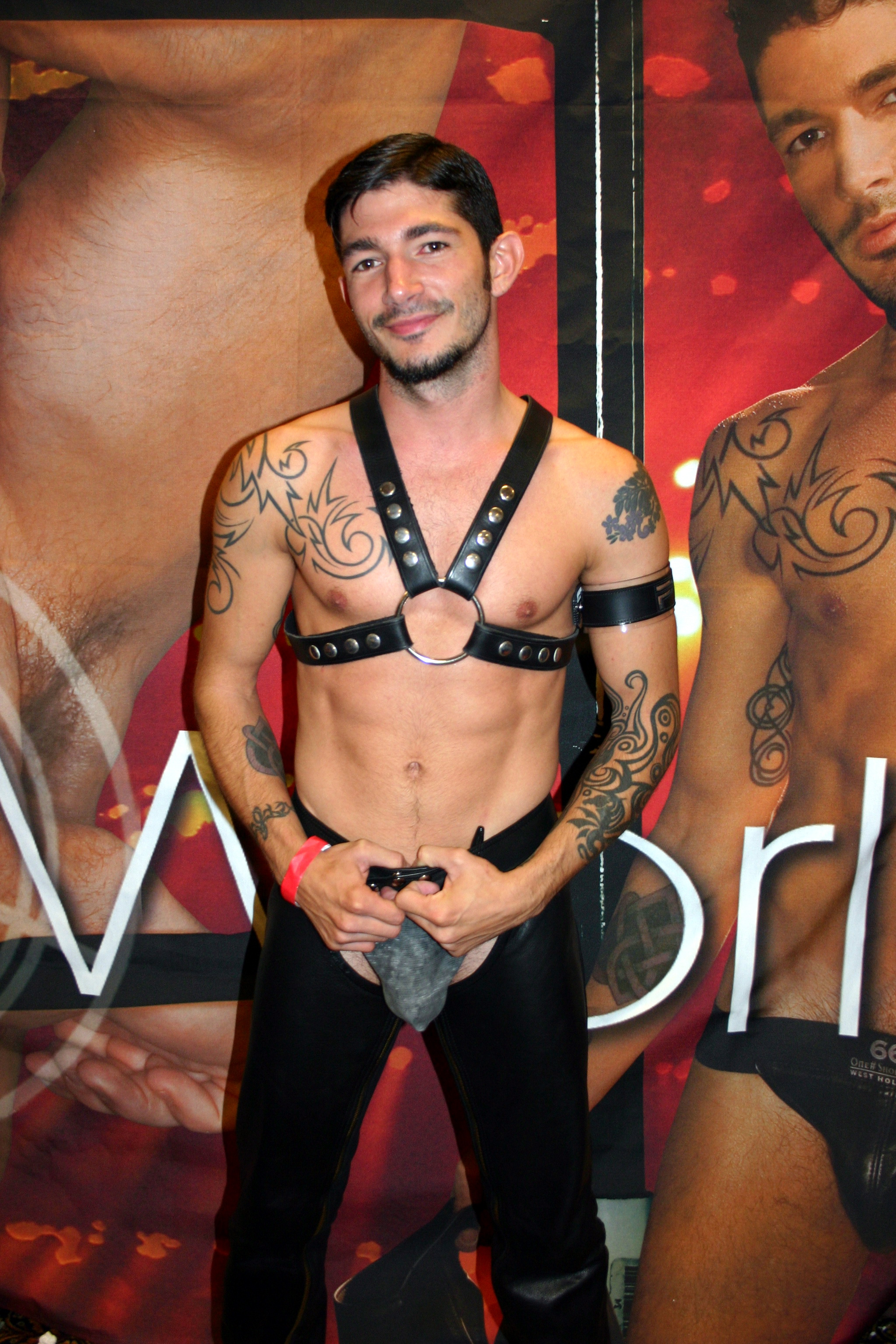
Johnny Hazzard won for Wrong Side of the Tracks in 2006.

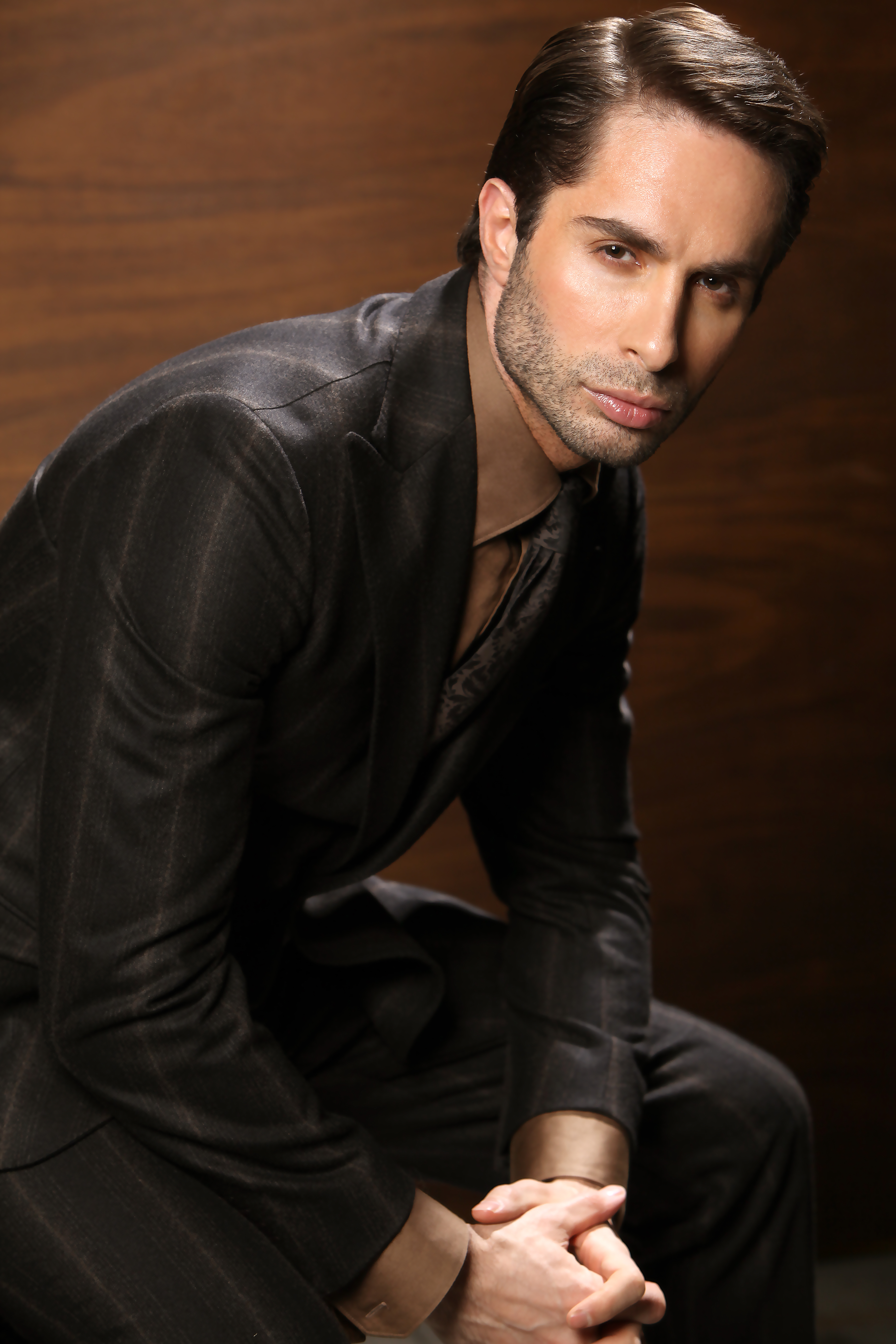
Michael Lucas won for Michael Lucas' La Dolce Vita in 2007, which he also directed.

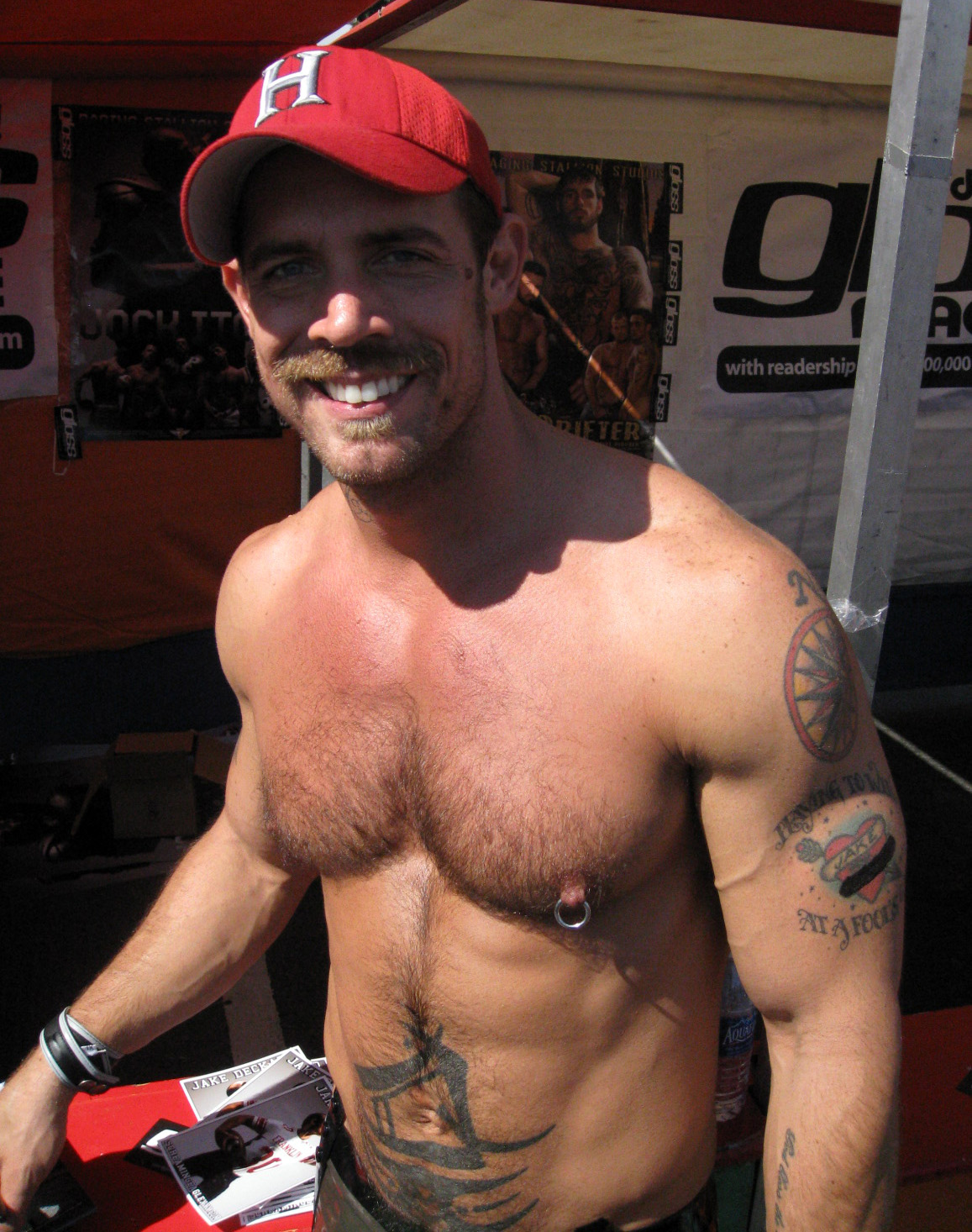
Jake Deckard won for Grunts in 2008.

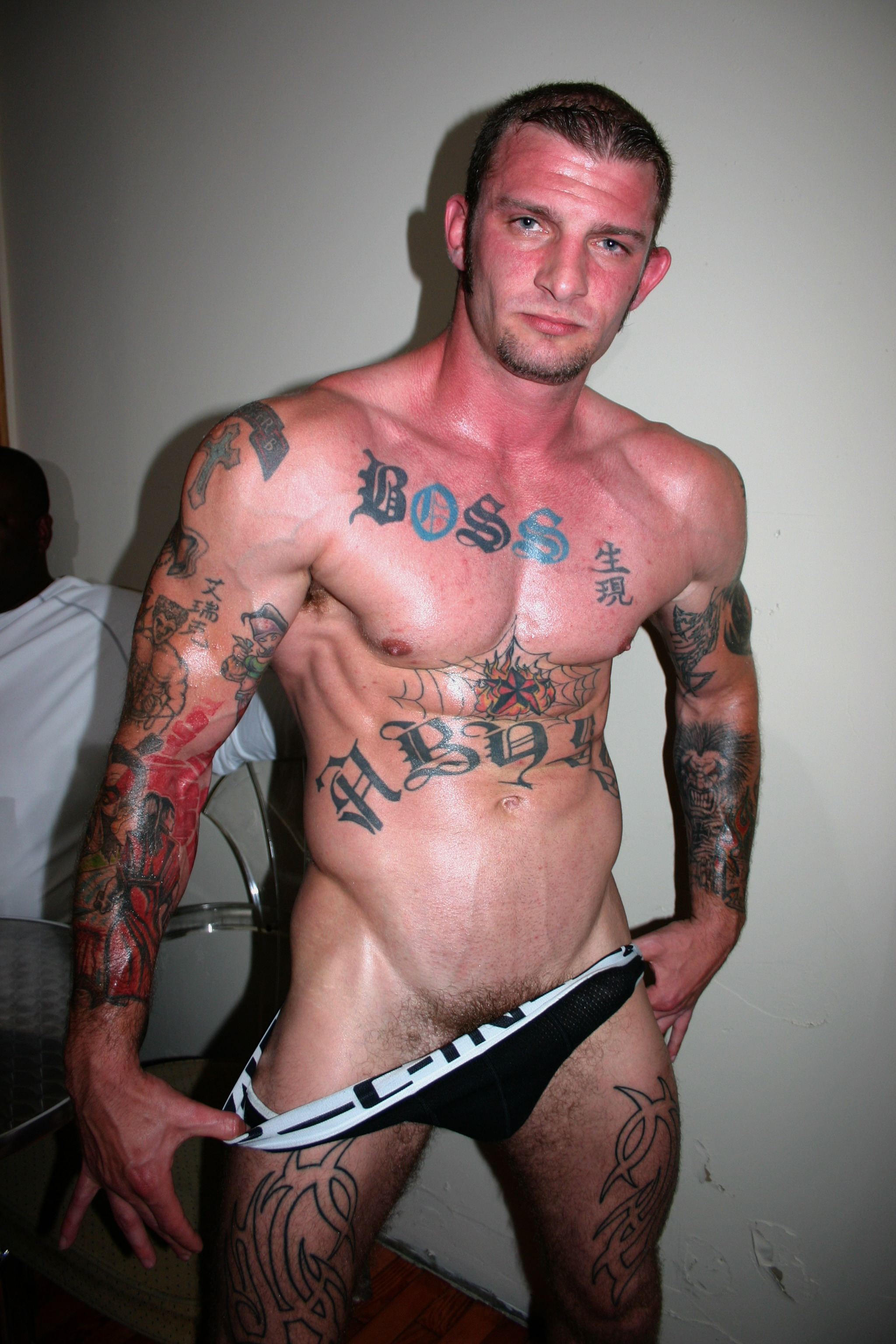
Ricky Sinz won for To the Last Man in 2009.

2000s winners and nominees
Award year	Actor	Film	Studio(s)	Ref(s).
2000 (2nd)	Blake Harper ‡	Animus	All Worlds Video	
2000 (2nd)	Rick Chase	Dream Team	Studio 2000	
2000 (2nd)	Joe Landon	The Apprentice	Delta Productions	
2000 (2nd)	Thomas Lloyd	Endless Pursuit	10% Productions/Greenwood-Cooper	
2000 (2nd)	Tommy Lord	Cuffed!	Studio 2000	
2000 (2nd)	Leo Lyons	Tales From The Foxhole	All Worlds Video	
2000 (2nd)	Spike	Spiked	All Worlds Video	
2000 (2nd)	Chris Steele	Steele Ranger	Rascal Video	
2000 (2nd)	Grant Wood	Late Nite Porn	Stable Entertainment	
2000 (2nd)	Kurt Young	Sodom	Vivid Man	
2001 (3rd)	Tony Donovan ‡	Echoes	Men of Odyssey	
2001 (3rd)	Johnny Brosnan	Out of Athens	Falcon Studios	
2001 (3rd)	Thomas Lloyd	Dirty Hairy	All Worlds Video	
2001 (3rd)	Dean Phoenix	The Servant	Stable Entertainment	
2001 (3rd)	Steve Rambo	Score	Catalina Video	
2001 (3rd)	Zak Spears	The Journey Back	Men of Odyssey	
2001 (3rd)	Corey Summers	Top Secret	Men of Odyssey	
2001 (3rd)	Colby Taylor	The Crush	Falcon Studios	
2001 (3rd)	Cole Tucker	Don't Ask, Don't Tell!	MSR Videos	
2001 (3rd)	Travis Wade	Now and Forever	Studio 2000	
2002 (4th)	Tony Donovan ‡	Carnal Intentions	Men of Odyssey	
2002 (4th)	Zak Spears ‡	The Joint	Men of Odyssey	
2002 (4th)	Jason Branch	Homo Erectus	MSR Videos	
2002 (4th)	D.C. Chandler	SuperCharge	Studio 2000	
2002 (4th)	Lance Gear	In Gear	Rascal Video	
2002 (4th)	Tanner Hayes	Seven Deadly Sins: Gluttony	All Worlds Video	
2002 (4th)	Billy Herrington	Conquered	All Worlds Video	
2002 (4th)	Court Logan	A Dream Come True	Rad Video	
2002 (4th)	Jeff Palmer	Palmer's Lust	Pacific Sun Entertainment	
2002 (4th)	Logan Reed	Going Down and Cumming Out in Beverly Hills	Great Dane	
2003 (5th)	Caesar ‡	Cowboy	Big Blue Productions	
2003 (5th)	Josh Weston ‡	Deep South: The Big and the Easy	Falcon Studios	
2003 (5th)	Lucas Foz	L'Elisir D'Amore	Lucas Kazan Productions	
2003 (5th)	Lance Gear	2nd Gear	Rascal Video/Channel 1 Releasing	
2003 (5th)	Michael Soldier	The Dirty Director	Raging Stallion	
2004 (6th)	Michael Soldier ‡	A Porn Star Is Born	Raging Stallion	
2004 (6th)	Tag Eriksson	The Hole	Jet Set Productions	
2004 (6th)	Joe Foster	A Man's Tail	Rascal Video/Channel 1 Releasing	
2004 (6th)	Paul Johnson	There Goes the Neighborhood	All Worlds Video	
2004 (6th)	Lance Landers	Dear Dick	All Worlds Video	
2004 (6th)	Jason McCain	Sex Psycho	Arena Entertainment/Thor Productions	
2004 (6th)	Jason Ridge	Nasty Nasty	Red Devil Entertainment	
2004 (6th)	Rob Romoni	Canvas	Red Devil Entertainment	
2004 (6th)	Carlo Cox	8 Inches	Marcostudio	
2004 (6th)	Josh Weston	Big Timber	Falcon Studios	
2005 (7th)	Dean Phoenix ‡	BuckleRoos 1–2	Buckshot Productions	
2005 (7th)	Rafael Alencar	Gored	Studio 2000	
2005 (7th)	Brad Benton	Wet Palms 1–3	Jet Set Team Productions	
2005 (7th)	Fyerfli	Husband by Day, Hustler by Night	All Worlds Video	
2005 (7th)	Marcus Iron	BuckleRoos	Buckshot Productions	
2005 (7th)	Michael Lucas	Lost	Lucas Entertainment	
2005 (7th)	Aiden Shaw	Perfect Fit	Hot House Entertainment	
2005 (7th)	Jim Slade	The Matrixxx: A Muscle Explosion	Big Blue Productions	
2005 (7th)	Michael Soldier	Wet Palms 1–3	Jet Set Team Productions	
2005 (7th)	Josh Weston	Taking Flight 1–2	Falcon Studios	
2006 (8th)	Johnny Hazzard ‡	Wrong Side of the Tracks	Rascal Video	
2006 (8th)	Rod Barry	Thirst	Adonis Pictures	
2006 (8th)	Brad Benton	Dirty Little Sins	Red Devil Entertainment	
2006 (8th)	Pierre Fitch	Through the Woods	Falcon Studios	
2006 (8th)	Junito	Wet Dreamz of Genie	Liquid Dreamz	
2006 (8th)	Michael Lucas	Dangerous Liaisons	Lucas Entertainment	
2006 (8th)	Gus Mattox	Dangerous Liaisons	Lucas Entertainment	
2006 (8th)	Brad Patton	Beyond Perfect	Buckshot Productions	
2006 (8th)	Bryce Pierce	110° in Tucson	Titan Media	
2006 (8th)	Colby Taylor	Getting It in the End	Jocks Studios	
2007 (9th)	Michael Lucas ‡	Michael Lucas' La Dolce Vita	Lucas Entertainment	
2007 (9th)	Shane Collins	Doggie Style	Jet Set Productions	
2007 (9th)	Erik Rhodes	The Velvet Mafia	Falcon Studios	
2007 (9th)	Danny Roddick	Boot Black Blues	Buckshot Productions	
2007 (9th)	Shane Rollins	Justice	Hot House Video	
2007 (9th)	Cole Ryan	The Chest	Titan Media	
2007 (9th)	Eddie Stone	2nd Inning	Electro Video	
2007 (9th)	Colby Taylor	Big Rig	Buckshot Productions	
2007 (9th)	Derrick Vinyard	From Top to Bottom	Falcon Studios	
2007 (9th)	Justin Wells	Booty Thief	Arena Entertainment	
2008 (10th)	Jake Deckard ‡	Grunts	Raging Stallion	
2008 (10th)	Dean Flynn	BarnStorm	Titan Media	
2008 (10th)	Roman Heart	Basic Plumbing 3	Falcon Studios	
2008 (10th)	Josh Vaughn	Bottom of the 9th: Little Big League 3	All Worlds Video	
2008 (10th)	Michael Lucas	Gigolo	Lucas Entertainment	
2008 (10th)	Vinnie D'Angelo	Gunnery Sgt. McCool	Titan Media	
2008 (10th)	Erik Rhodes	The Ivy League	Falcon Entertainment	
2008 (10th)	Dean Phoenix	On Fire!	Jet Set Men	
2008 (10th)	Jason Ridge	A Rising Star	Ridgeline Films	
2008 (10th)	Tiger Tyson	Tiger's Eiffel Tower: Paris is Mine!	Pitbull Productions	
2009 (11th)	Ricky Sinz ‡	To the Last Man	Raging Stallion	
2009 (11th)	Tony Buff	Home Invasion	Titan Media	
2009 (11th)	Chad Clovis	Friendly Force	G&G Media	
2009 (11th)	Brent Corrigan	Just the Sex	Dirty Bird Pictures/Prodigy Pictures	
2009 (11th)	D.O.	Sex Hiker	Black Scorpion	
2009 (11th)	Austin Grant	Young Guns	Centaur Films	
2009 (11th)	Roman Heart	Roman's Holiday	Falcon Studios	
2009 (11th)	Chad Hunt	Endgame	Dirty Bird Pictures	
2009 (11th)	Ross Hurston	Paging Dr. Finger	Hot House Entertainment	
2009 (11th)	Aaron James	Ass Cruisin'	Jet Set Men	
2009 (11th)	Wilfried Knight	Brothers' Reunion	Lucas Entertainment	
2009 (11th)	Cameron Marshall	Black Meat White Heat	All Worlds Video	
2009 (11th)	Logan McCree	The Drifter	Raging Stallion	
2009 (11th)	Zack Randall	Paradise Found	Buckshot	
2009 (11th)	Erik Rhodes	Best Men 1 & 2	Falcon Studios	
2009 (11th)	Blake Riley	Unknown	Rascal Video / Channel 1 Releasing	
2009 (11th)	Kaden Saylor	The Porne Ultimatum	Dirty Bird Pictures	
2009 (11th)	Brad Star	South Beach Diaries	ASG Entertainment	
2009 (11th)	Aaron Tyler	The Twink Whisperer	PZP Productions	

=== 2010s ===
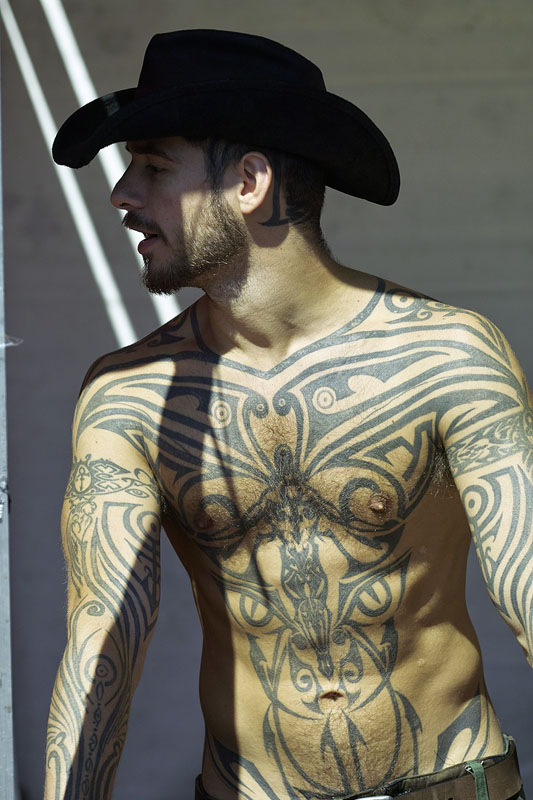
Logan McCree won for The Visitor in 2010.

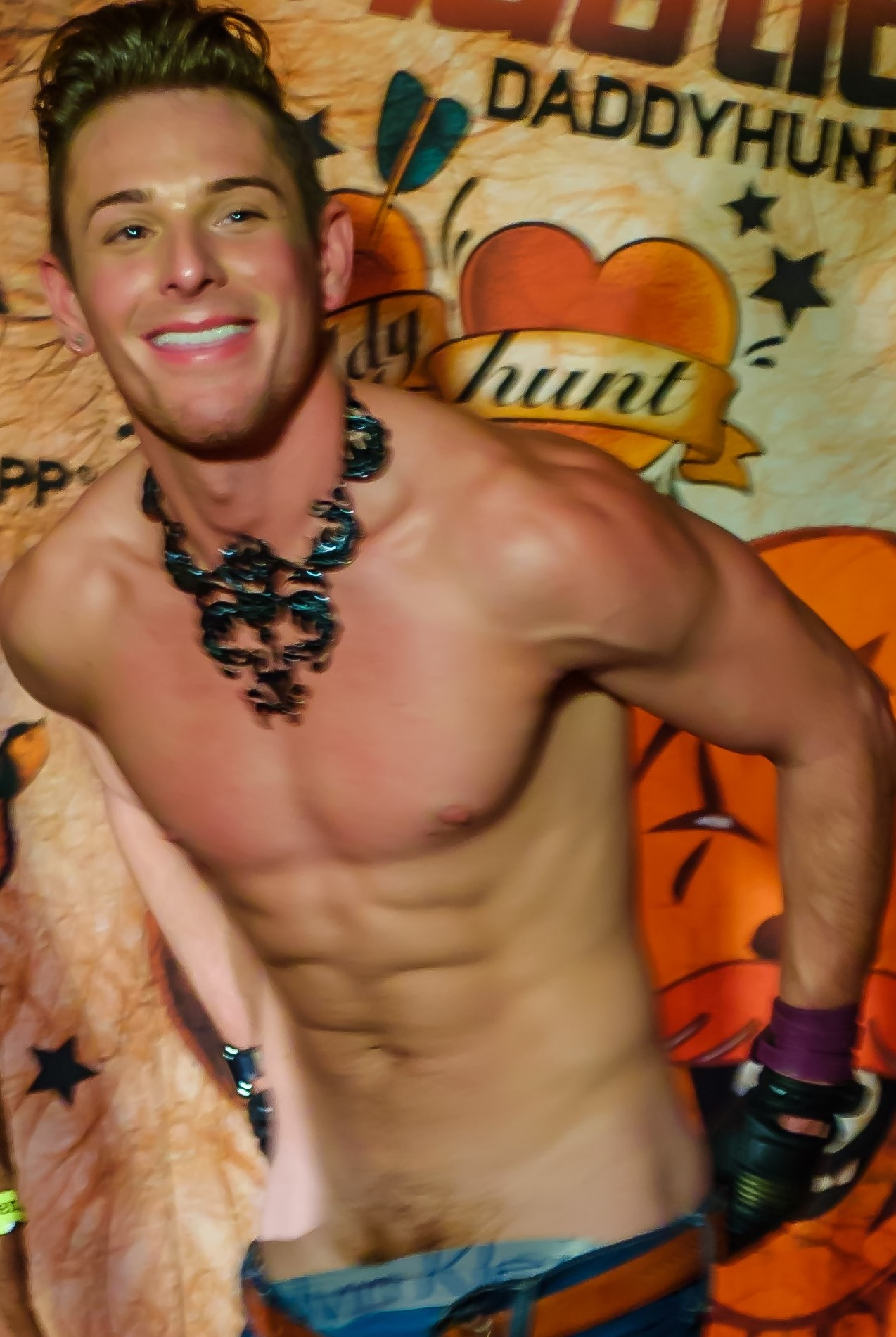
Brent Corrigan won for Ultra Fan in 2018.

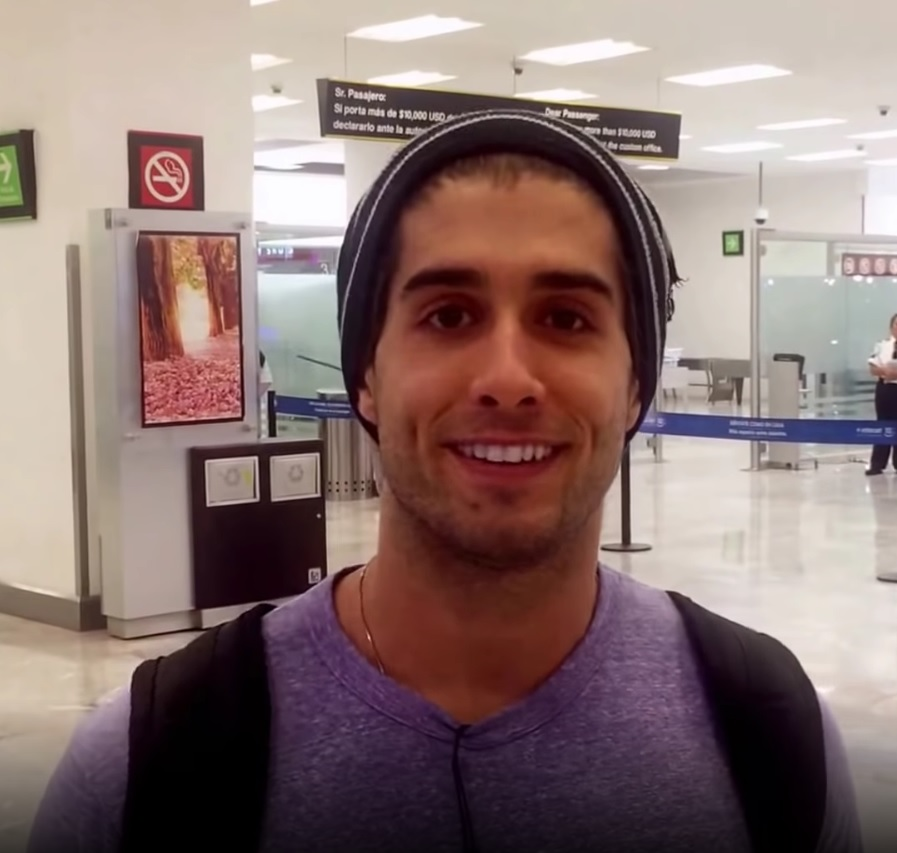
Diego Sans won for Pirates: A Gay XXX Parody in 2019.

2010s winners and nominees
Award year	Actor	Film	Studio(s)	Ref(s).
2010 (12th)	Logan McCree ‡	The Visitor	Raging Stallion	
2010 (12th)	Allen Silver	Dad Takes a Fishing Trip	Dragon/Gage Media	
2010 (12th)	Cole Streets	Focus/ReFocus	Raging Stallion Studios	
2010 (12th)	Luke Marcum	Whorrey Potter and the Sorcerer's Balls	Dominic Ford	
2010 (12th)	Steven Tyler	HouseBoy	DreamBoy Productions/Eurocreme	
2010 (12th)	Wilfried Knight	Obsession	Lucas Entertainment	
2018 (13th)	Brent Corrigan ‡	Ultra Fan	NakedSword/Falcon Studios	
2018 (13th)	David Benjamin	Silverlake	TitanMen/Pulse	
2018 (13th)	Matthew Bosch	Cauke for Free	TitanMen/Pulse	
2018 (13th)	James Castle	Barebackula	Lucas Entertainment	
2018 (13th)	Trenton Ducati	Secrets & Lies	NakedSword/Rock Candy	
2018 (13th)	Quentin Gainz	Straight Chexxx	Next Door/Pulse	
2018 (13th)	Tayte Hansen	Fuck Him Up	Men.com/Pulse	
2018 (13th)	Dustin Holloway	Route 69	Falcon Studios	
2018 (13th)	Colby Keller	The Stillest Hour	CockyBoys	
2018 (13th)	Markie More	Straight Chexxx	Next Door/Pulse	
2018 (13th)	Adam Ramzi	It's Coming	Raging Stallion/Falcon Studios	
2018 (13th)	Ryan Rose	Scared Stiff	NakedSword/Falcon Studios	
2018 (13th)	Adam Russo	The Stepfather 3	Icon Male/Mile High Media	
2018 (13th)	Will Wikle	The Stillest Hour	CockyBoys	
2018 (13th)	Brandon Wilde	His Sister's Lover 2	Icon Male/Mile High Media	
2019 (14th)	Diego Sans ‡	Pirates: A Gay XXX Parody	Men.com/Pulse	
2019 (14th)	Wesley Woods ‡	Zack & Jack Make a Porno	Falcon Studios	
2019 (14th)	Max Adonis	Max in the City	Falcon Studios	
2019 (14th)	Calvin Banks	All Saints: Chapter 1	CockyBoys	
2019 (14th)	Remy Cruze	Breaking Mr. Hart	Golden Age Films/NakedSword	
2019 (14th)	Carter Dane	All Saints: Chapter 1	CockyBoys	
2019 (14th)	Ace Era	The Slutty Professor	NakedSword/Falcon Studios	
2019 (14th)	Sean Ford	Love Lost & Found	CockyBoys	
2019 (14th)	Woody Fox	Zack & Jack Make a Porno	Falcon Studios	
2019 (14th)	Colton Grey	Paris Perfect	NakedSword/Falcon Studios	
2019 (14th)	Riley Mitchel	Bounty Hunters	Raging Stallion/Falcon Studios	
2019 (14th)	Michael Roman	Daddy Dilemma	Icon Male/Mile High Media	
2019 (14th)	Roman Todd	The Married Man	Icon Male/Mile High Media	
2019 (14th)	Daymin Voss	Vice	Raging Stallion/Falcon Studios	
2019 (14th)	Tegan Zayne	Three Wishes	Raging Stallion/Falcon Studios	

=== 2020s ===
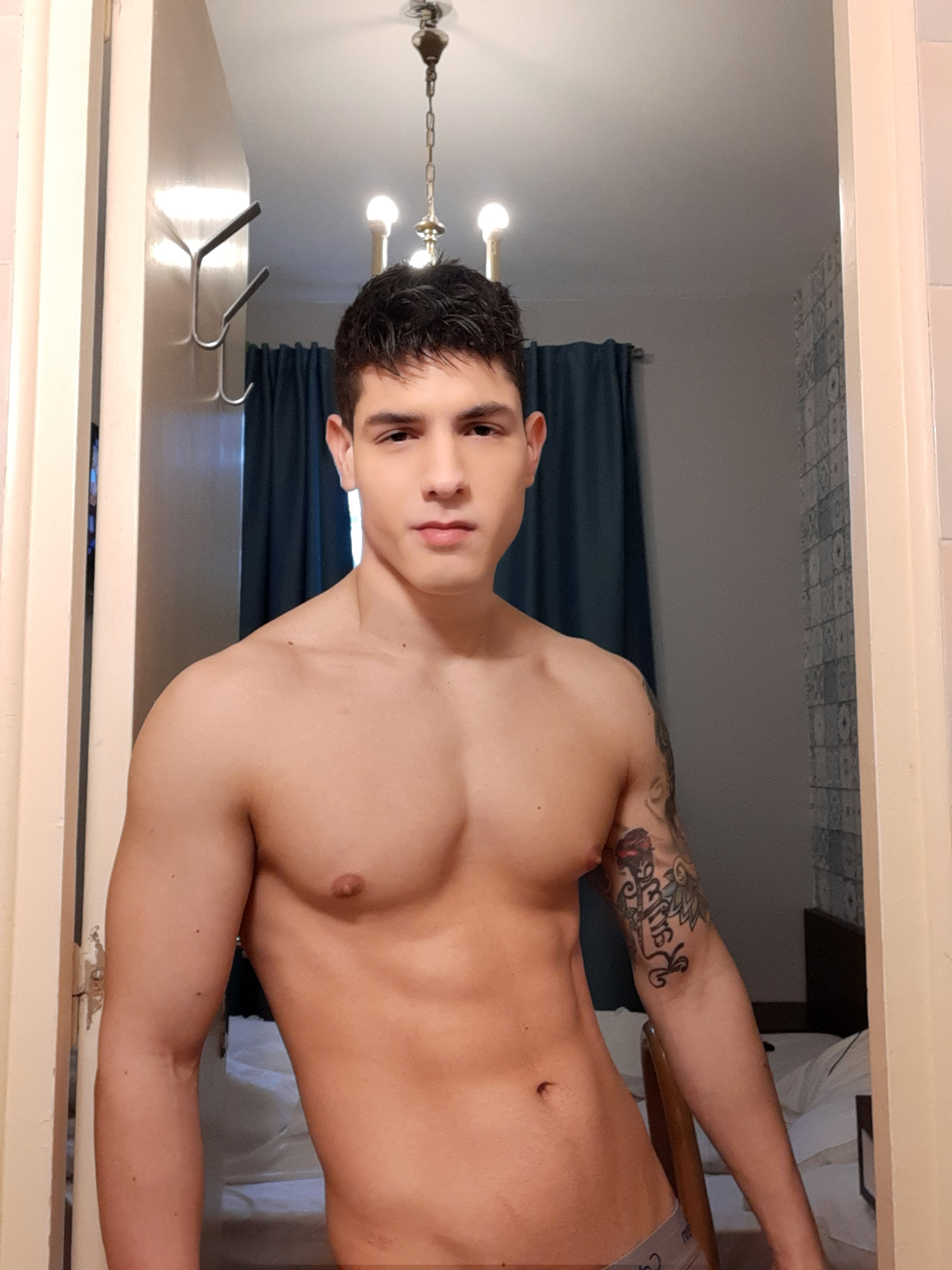
Bastian Karim won for The Mafia in 2025.

2020s winners and nominees
Award year	Actor	Film	Studio(s)	Ref(s).
2020 (15th)	DeAngelo Jackson ‡	Blended Family	Icon Male/Mile High	
2020 (15th)	Max Adonis	Dirty Deeds	Men.com	
2020 (15th)	Bruce Beckham	Get Your Dick Outta My Son!	Men.com/Pulse	
2020 (15th)	Matthew Camp	Camp Chaos	Men.com	
2020 (15th)	Nick Capra	Don't Tell My Wife	Icon Male/Mile High	
2020 (15th)	Sean Ford	Le Garçon Scandaleux	CockyBoys/PinkTV	
2020 (15th)	Max Konnor	Feed Me Your Love	PeterFever	
2020 (15th)	Ricky Larkin	At Large	Raging Stallion/Falcon	
2020 (15th)	Riley Mitchel	The Night Riders	Raging Stallion/Falcon	
2020 (15th)	Cameron Parks	Vegas Nights	HelixStudios.com	
2020 (15th)	Pierce Paris	The Legend of Big Cock	Men.com	
2020 (15th)	Michael Roman	My Stepdad's Stepdad	Icon Male/Mile High	
2020 (15th)	Nic Sahara	Five Brothers: Family Values/The Takedown	NakedSword.com	
2020 (15th)	Mickey Taylor	Psycho Joe	NakedSword/Falcon	
2020 (15th)	Roman Todd	Beach Rats of Lauderdale	Falcon Studios	
2021 (16th)	Angel Rivera ‡	A Murdered Heart	NakedSword	
2021 (16th)	Beaux Banks	Rise of the Sirens	Men.com	
2021 (16th)	Calvin Banks	The Gay Simple Life	NakedSword	
2021 (16th)	Dante Colle	Scared Stiff 2: The Amityville Whore	NakedSword	
2021 (16th)	Drew Dixon	What's Gotten into Him?	Masqulin.com	
2021 (16th)	Andre Donovan	Journeys – Season Two	Himeros.tv	
2021 (16th)	DeAngelo Jackson	Sin City	Noir Male	
2021 (16th)	Trevor Harris	Happy Campers	Helix	
2021 (16th)	Devin Holt	The Lake House	Helix	
2021 (16th)	Tristan Hunter	My Best Friend's Dad	Icon Male	
2021 (16th)	Nico Leon	Hollywood and Vine	CockyBoys	
2021 (16th)	Drake Masters	Timberwolves 2: Blood Moon	Raging Stallion	
2021 (16th)	Josh Moore	Califuckinfornia	Falcon	
2021 (16th)	Johnny Rapid	A Tale of Two Cock Destroyers	Men.com	
2021 (16th)	Taylor Reign	Love Thy Neighbor	Icon Male	
2022 (17th)	Michael DelRay ‡	The Last Course	Disruptive Films	
2022 (17th)	Alex Riley ‡	Return to Helix Academy Parts 1 & 2	Helix Studios	
2022 (17th)	Johnny B	Don't Tell My Wife 2	Icon Male	
2022 (17th)	Cole Conner	Making the Grade	Falcon	
2022 (17th)	Paul Delay	FBI: Frisky Boys Investigation	French-Twinks.com	
2022 (17th)	Andre Donovan	The Territory	Raging Stallion	
2022 (17th)	Casey Everett	Painful Love	Icon Male	
2022 (17th)	Tayte Hanson	(Un)Lucky in Love	CockyBoys	
2022 (17th)	Trevor Harris	Return to Helix Academy Parts 1 & 2	Helix Studios	
2022 (17th)	Devin Holt	A Halloween Story	Helix Studios	
2022 (17th)	Tristan Hunter	Work From Home	Falcon	
2022 (17th)	Garrett Kinsley	Let's Hit It	Helix Studios	
2022 (17th)	Dominic Pacifico	A Stepbrother's Obsession 2	Icon Male	
2022 (17th)	Adam Russo	Caught Raw-Handed	Masqulin.com	
2022 (17th)	Roman Todd	Best Sex Ever	NakedSword.com	
2023 (18th)	Cole Connor ‡	Ride or Die: Raw Deal/Hard Time	Raging Stallion	
2023 (18th)	Brock Banks	Love Happens	CockyBoys	
2023 (18th)	Silas Brooks	Tech Support	Helix Studios	
2023 (18th)	Beau Butler	Dirty 30 Bareback Birthday	Raging Stallion	
2023 (18th)	Dillon Diaz	Briar Basin Ranch	Disruptive Films	
2023 (18th)	Felix Fox	Norse Fuckers	Men.com	
2023 (18th)	Leo Grand	Game On	CockyBoys	
2023 (18th)	Dann Grey	Historias de Barcelona	TLAgay	
2023 (18th)	Asher Haynes	Un-Romantic Getaway	Helix Studios	
2023 (18th)	Bastian Karim	Historias de Barcelona	TLAgay	
2023 (18th)	Draven Navarro	Next Stop Vegas	Disruptive Films	
2023 (18th)	Seth Peterson	Unraveled	Helix Studios	
2023 (18th)	Diego Sans	Get. Away.	NakedSword.com	
2023 (18th)	Derek Shaw	Just Friends	Helix Studios	
2023 (18th)	Dean Young	Body & Sol	Falcon	
2024 (19th)	Derek Kage ‡	Overdrive	Raging Stallion	
2024 (19th)	Tyler Berg	Dis-Connecting	TLAgay	
2024 (19th)	Beau Butler	Guilty As Sin	Raging Stallion	
2024 (19th)	Cole Connor	The Swords: Final Cut	NakedSword Originals	
2024 (19th)	Andre Donovan	The Swords: First Mission	NakedSword Originals	
2024 (19th)	Tristan Hunter	Jake Jaxson's Happy Endings	CockyBoys	
2024 (19th)	Jayden Marcos	Changes	Next Door Films/ASGMax.com	
2024 (19th)	Jordi Massive	Full Holes	FamlyDick.com/SayUncle.com	
2024 (19th)	Enrique Mudu	The Bartender: The Final Cut	LatinLeche.com/SayUncle.com	
2024 (19th)	Sir Peter	Royally Fucked	Men.com	
2024 (19th)	Dan Saxon	Cumming Home for Christmas	Falcon	
2024 (19th)	Adam Snow	The Professor	Gaycest.com/CarnalPlus.com	
2024 (19th)	Roman Todd	The Swords	NakedSword Originals	
2024 (19th)	Drew Valentino	Strong Suit	Raging Stallion	
2024 (19th)	Carter Woods	For You, I Will	Disruptive Films/ASGMax.com	
2025 (20th)	Bastian Karim ‡	The Mafia	Staghomme/CarnalPlus.com	
2025 (20th)	Cole Connor	Heart On	NakedSword Originals	
2025 (20th)	Callum Cox	Heart On	NakedSword Originals	
2025 (20th)	Gustavo Cruz	Diary of a Gigolo	MenAtPlay.com	
2025 (20th)	Pietro Duarte	Hidden Truths	TLAgay	
2025 (20th)	Heath Halo	Bred & Breakfast: All the Way Inn	NakedSword Originals	
2025 (20th)	Justin Jett	Hidden Truths	TLAgay	
2025 (20th)	Hoss Kado	Honeyguide	Disruptive Films/ASGMax.com	
2025 (20th)	Derek Kage	The Goldenrod Resort	ASGMax Films/ASGMax.com	
2025 (20th)	Jayden Marcos	No Strings Attached	Next Door Studios/ASGMax.com	
2025 (20th)	Damian Night	Cum All Ye Faithful	Falcon	
2025 (20th)	Sir Peter	Yes, Sir!	NakedSword X Sir Peter	
2025 (20th)	Reece Scott	Staying With Dad	Gaycest/CarnalPlus.com	
2025 (20th)	Adam Snow	International Transfer	Gaycest/CarnalPlus.com	
2025 (20th)	Carter Woods	Breaking Frontiers	Next Door Studios/ASGMax.com	
2026 (21st)	Paddy O’Brian ‡	To the Nines	Falcon/MenAtPlay	
2026 (21st)	Andrew Delta	Welcome Home	ASGmax Films/ASGmax.com	
2026 (21st)	Brody Fox	The Adventures of Brody Fox	KinkMen.com	
2026 (21st)	Rocky Heron (Rocky Unleashed)	The Manchineel King	Himeros.tv	
2026 (21st)	Tim James	The Way to a Man’s Heart	Raging Stallion	
2026 (21st)	Michael Klashman	The Manchineel King	Himeros.tv	
2026 (21st)	Jayden Marcos	Pledge Daddy	Disruptive Films/ASGmax.com	
2026 (21st)	MrDeepVoice	Dawn of the Gladiators	Men.com	
2026 (21st)	Blain O’Connor	Wild Game	NakedSword X Disruptive Films	
2026 (21st)	Ryder Owens	The Goldenrod Resort 2: Singles Weekend	ASGmax Films/ASGmax.com	
2026 (21st)	Eddie Patrick	Sexerance	SayUncle.com	
2026 (21st)	Sir Peter	The Barcelona Job	NakedSword X Voyr	
2026 (21st)	Adam Snow	Deeper Deep Throat	Carnal+ Originals / CarnalPlus.com/BarebackPlus.com	
2026 (21st)	Paul Wagner	Wild Game	NakedSword X Disruptive Films	
2026 (21st)	Guillaume Wayne	Below the Belt	HungFuckers/BarebackPlus.com	
