= Josh Weston =

American pornographic actor (1973-2012)

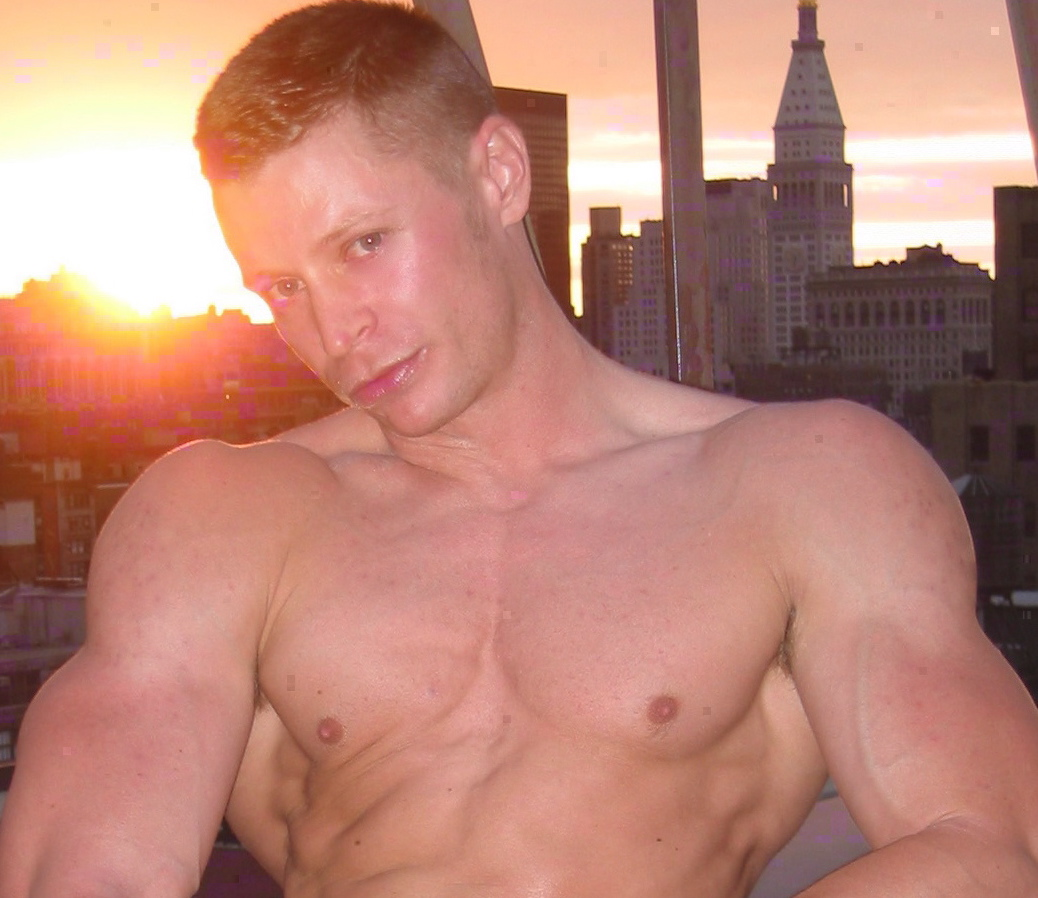
- Born: Chad Jason Hull; January 20, 1973; Sparks, Nevada, U.S.
- Died: December 16, 2012 (aged 39); San Francisco, California, U.S.
- Occupation: Pornographic actor
- Years active: 2002–2011

Chad Jason Hull (January 20, 1973 – December 16, 2012), better known as Josh Weston, was an American pornographic actor who appeared in gay pornographic films and magazines.

== Personal life and career ==
A native of Nevada, after graduating from college he moved to San Francisco and commenced a career as a personal trainer. He was discovered by adult film producer/director Chi Chi LaRue while dancing at the Nob Hill Theatre. In 2001, he signed an exclusive contract with Falcon Studios.

After the ending of his contract, he worked with a number of bareback and mainstream gay pornography studios.

Weston died at California Pacific Medical Center in San Francisco on December 16, 2012, from septic shock and bacterial endocarditis, which were complications related to his HIV positive status. He was 39. At the time of his death, he was apparently writing a memoir titled Sleeping My Way to the Bottom.

== Awards ==
- 2002 Grabby Awards for Best Duo Sex Scene (with Matthew Rush) in Deep South, Part 2
- 2003 GayVN Awards Best Actor for Deep South, Part 1
- 2003 GayVN Awards Best Three Way (with Jeremy Jordan and Jack Ryan) for Deep South, Part 1
- 2007 Grabby Awards for Best Cum Scene for Manly Heat: Scorched

== See also ==
- List of male performers in gay porn films
- List of pornographic movie studios
