= Bastian Karim =

Colombian pornographic actor (born 1996)

- Bastian Karim in 2020
- Born: Sebastián Loaiza; March 31, 1996 (age 30); Pereira, Colombia
- Occupations: Adult film actor, model
- Years active: 2017–present
- Awards: GayVN Award for Best Actor (2025)
- Website: bastiankarim.es

Sebastián Loaiza (born March 31, 1996), better known as Bastian Karim, is a Colombian gay pornographic actor and model.

== Early life ==
Bastian Karim was born Sebastián Loaiza on March 31 1996, in Pereira, Colombia. He moved to Spain where he currently lives.

== Career ==
Karim began his career in the adult entertainment industry driven by an interest in personal freedom and self-expression. After initially encountering rejection in Spain due to not fitting the conventional profile of performers in the field, he pursued opportunities abroad. He later relocated to Prague, Czech Republic, where he filmed his first scene for BoyFun in 2017. In 2019, he debuted with Tim Kruger’s studio, TimTales.

Since the early 2020s, Karim has worked in the international gay adult film industry, primarily in Europe. He has appeared in productions for studios such as Kristen Bjorn, TimTales, Falcon, Lucas Entertainment, and MenAtPlay, among others. In addition to his film work, he has modeled for lingerie brands.

In 2020, he co-starred alongside fellow adult performer Allen King in the music video for King's single "Me da Igual," which features singer La Pelopony. In 2022, Karim won Best Twink at the Grabby Awards in Europe. The following year, he was awarded with two more awards Best Jock and Best Couple (together with Sir Peter) for his participation in a production for MenAtPlay.

Between 2023 and 2024, Karim collaborated with filmmaker Paul Granier on a short documentary about his life, scheduled for release under Mood films. In late 2023, he signed an exclusive contract with the American company Carnal Media.

In 2024, Karim made a cameo appearance opposite Jaime Lorente in the Netflix series Iron Reign (Mano de Hierro), a Barcelona-set crime drama produced by The Mediapro Studio. In 2025, he won the GayVN Award for Best Actor in recognition for his performance in The Mafia, produced by StagHomme/CarnalPlus.com.

== Filmography ==
Selected work of Bastian Karim
Title	Year	Notes	Studio	Ref.
Me da Igual	2020	Music video; Allen King and LaPelopony	YouTube	
Islas Canarias	2022	Main cast	NakedSword	
Taking Care of Business	2022	Main cast	Falcon	
Historias de Barcelona	2023	Main cast	TLAgay	
The Florist With A Big Dick	2024	Opposite Sir Peter	Macho Factory	
An Executive Bargain	2024	Co-star Justin Jett	MenAtPlay	
Iron Reign	2024	Cameo, opposite Jaime Lorente	Netflix	
The Mafia	2025	Bastian; also director	Staghomme	
Soy Un Chico Normal	TBA	Himself; Paul Granier Documentary	Mood Films	

== Accolades ==
List of awards and nominations received by Bastian Karim
Award	Year	Category	Nominated work	Studio	Result	Ref.
Fleshbot Awards	2022	Gay Best Flip-Fuck	Islas Canarias (Note: shared with Sam Steiner)	NakedSword	Nominated	
Fleshbot Awards	2022	Gay Best Group Sex Scene	Taking Care of Business Part 3 (Note: with Angel Rivera, and Dean Young)	Falcon Studios	Nominated	
Fleshbot Awards	2022	Gay Movie of the Year	Taking Care of Business (Note: shared with Tyler Berg, Manuel Reyes, Pietro Duarte, Sean Weiss, Angel Rivera, Dean Young, and Craig Marks)	Falcon Studios	Nominated	
GayVN Awards	2023	Best Actor	Historias de Barcelona	TLAgay	Nominated	
GayVN Awards	2024	Favorite Bottom	Himself	—N/a	Nominated	
GayVN Awards	2024	Favorite Butt	Himself	—N/a	Nominated	
GayVN Awards	2025	Best Actor	The Mafia	Staghomme/CarnalPlus	Won	
GayVN Awards	2025	Best Director	The Mafia	Staghomme/CarnalPlus	Nominated	
GayVN Awards	2026	Best Fourgy Scene	The Men of the Stepfamily: Group Dynamics (Note: shared with Apolo Adrii, Hugo Dupre, and Apolo XL)	Gaycest/CarnalPlus	Nominated	
GayVN Awards	2026	Best Supporting Actor	Below the Belt	HungFuckers/BarebackPlus	Nominated	
Grabby Awards	2022	Best Twink	Himself	—N/a	Won	
Grabby Awards	2022	Best Bottom	Himself	—N/a	Nominated	
Grabby Awards	2022	Best Couple	Himself	—N/a	Nominated	
Grabby Awards	2022	Best Jock	Himself	—N/a	Nominated	
Grabby Awards	2022	Fansite Performer Of The Year	Himself	—N/a	Nominated	
Grabby Awards	2022	Fetish Pornstar Or The Year	Himself	—N/a	Nominated	
Grabby Awards	2022	Most Accomplished International Pornstar	Himself	—N/a	Nominated	
Grabby Awards	2022	Pornstar Of The Year	Himself	—N/a	Nominated	
Grabby Awards	2023	Best Jock	Himself	—N/a	Won	
Grabby Awards	2023	Best Couple	with Sir Peter	MenAtPlay	Won	
Grabby Awards	2023	Best Scene	The Florist With A Big Dick	Macho Factory	Won	
Grabby Awards	2024	Pornstar of the Year	Himself	—N/a	Nominated	
Grabby Awards	2024	Most Accomplished International Pornstar	Himself	—N/a	Nominated	
Grabby Awards	2024	Best Jock	Himself	—N/a	Nominated	
Grabby Awards	2024	Best Bottom	Himself	—N/a	Nominated	
Grabby Awards	2024	Best Scene	with Igor Lucios and Ricky Hard (Note: in Fansite Content.)	OnlyFans	Nominated	
Grabby Awards	2024	Best Duo	with Justin Jett (Note: in Men At Play's An Executive Bargain.)	MenAtPlay	Nominated	
Grabby Awards	2024	Best Duo	with Tim Kruger	TimTales	Won	
XBIZ Europa Awards	2023	Gay Performer of the Year	Himself	—N/a	Won	
XBIZ Europa Awards	2024	Gay Performer of the Year	Himself	—N/a	Nominated	
XMA Europa Awards	2025	Gay Performer of the Year	Himself	—N/a	Nominated	

== See also ==
- List of male performers in gay porn films
