= Paddy O'Brian =

English pornographic actor (born 1986)

- Born: Liam Patrick Hanlon; 25 March 1986 (age 40); Hackney, London, UK
- Other names: Leon, Liam Cockney, Patrick, Patrick O'Brien
- Years active: 2010–present
- Height: 5 ft 8 in (1.73 m)
- Website: paddyobrian.com

Liam Patrick Hanlon (born 25 March 1986), known professionally as Paddy O'Brian, is an English pornographic actor and model. He began his career in pornography in 2010, appearing in solo scenes for EnglishLads, before going on to appear in over 100 scenes for Men.com. He has also worked for other studios including Falcon Entertainment and Raging Stallion Studios, as well as having an OnlyFans account.

== Early life ==
O'Brian was born Liam Patrick Hanlon in Hackney, London on 25 March 1986. Whilst in school, he trained in karate, boxing and athletics. Prior to his career in pornography, O'Brian had worked as a machine operator for a dumper truck, done fencing work for gardens, and served as a gym assistant.

== Career ==
Early on in his career, O'Brian worked as an underwear model for designers such as Calvin Klein, Armani, and Dolce & Gabbana, as well as various fitness magazines.

In 2010, he embarked on a career in pornography, performing solos for the website EnglishLads.com. Later, he appeared in other films for production companies such as Colt Studios, Raging Stallion, Falcon Studios, Lucas Entertainment, UK Naked Men, and most notably Men.com, among others. In 2016, O'Brian co-starred as The Winter Soldier in the gay porn parody of Captain America.

In September 2022, O'Brian made a cameo in the music video for Sam Smith and Kim Petras’ song "Unholy". In March 2025, he signed as an exclusive performer for the Falcon Studios.

In January 2026, O'Brian won the GayVN Award for Best Actor for his performance in To the Nines, produced by Falcon Studios.

== Personal life ==
O'Brian identifies as straight, describing himself as a "gay-for-pay" actor.

== Selected filmography ==
=== Films ===
Year	Title	Studios	Notes	Ref.
2011	Addicted to Cock	Hot Spunks	Directed by Mike Esser	
2011	A Police Man Fucked My Son	Eurocreme	Directed by Blue Blake	
2012	Cock Crazy	UK Naked Men	Directed by Jonno	
2012	Paddy O'Brian's Fucking My Arse	Hot Spunks	Directed by Mike Esser	
2012	Deep Inside	Falcon Entertainment	Directed by Steve Cruz	
2012	Summer Lust	Falcon Entertainment	Directed by Tony Dimarco	
2013	Oh My Godfre	Raging Stallion	Directed by Benjamin Godfre	
2013	Secret Agent	Men.com	Co-star Tomas Brand	
2013	Huge Dick Muscle Lads	Hard Brit Lads	Directed by Simon Booth	
2013	Unzipped	Lucas Entertainment	Directed by Michael Lucas	
2013	Dark Dreams	UK Naked Men	Directed by Jonno	
2013	Fallen	Men.com	Men of U.K.	
2013	Deep Connection	Men.com	Men of U.K.	
2014	Prisoner of War	Men.com	Directed by Alter Sin	
2014	The End	Men.com	Directed by Alter Sin	
2015	Howl	Men.com	Directed by Alter Sin	
2015	Gay of Thrones 2	Men.com	Directed by Alter Sin	
2016	Batman v Superman: A Gay XXX Parody	Men.com	Directed by Alter Sin	
2016	Captain America: A Gay XXX Parody	Men.com	Directed by Alter Sin	
2017	Sense 8: A Gay XXX Parody	Men.com	Directed by Alter Sin	
2017	Ex-Machina	Men.com	Directed by Alter Sin	
2018	Sex God	Men.com	Directed by Alter Sin	
2019	Emergency Sex	Men.com	Co-star Dante Colle	
2020	Conjuring Dick	Men.com	Co-star Chris Loan	
2021	Hole Invitation	Macho Mayhem	Solo scene	
2024	Spain in the Ass	NakedSword	Directed by Alter Sin & Ben Rush	
2025	Time Warp Fuckers	Men.com	Lead Role, Directed by Alter Sin	
2025	Paddy O'Brian: The Man Behind the Actor	Men Crush	Documentary	
2025	The Devil You Know	Raging Stallion	Co-star Jake Mathews	
2025	The Air Outside	Men.com	Co-star Caio Rodrigues	
2026	Ashes Before Dawn	NakedSword	Lead Role, Directed by Alter Sin	

== Accolades ==
List of awards and nominations received by Paddy O'Brian
Award	Year	Category	Nominated work	Result	Ref.
Besametonto Awards	2015	Best Porn Star International	Himself	Won	
GayVN Awards	2018	Best Group Sex Scene	Sense 8: A Gay XXX Parody	Nominated	
GayVN Awards	2019	Best Supporting Actor	Pirates: A Gay XXX Parody	Nominated	
GayVN Awards	2019	Best Three-Way Sex Scene	Sex God (Note: shared with Allen King, and Francois Sagat.)	Nominated	
GayVN Awards	2020	Best Three-Way Sex Scene	Anal Abduction (Note: shared with Francois Sagat, and Lukas Daken.)	Nominated	
GayVN Awards	2025	Best Three-Way Sex Scene	Bending Over In The Boardroom (Note: shared with MrDeepVoice, and Sir Peter.)	Nominated	
GayVN Awards	2025	Best Actor — Featurette	Prisoner of War: 10 Years Later	Won	
GayVN Awards	2026	Best Actor	To the Nines	Won	
GayVN Awards	2026	Best Duo Sex Scene	Spain in the Ass (“Sir Peter & Paddy O’Brian Flip-Fuck”)	Nominated	
Grabby Europe Awards	2022	Best Daddy	Himself	Nominated	
Grabby Europe Awards	2022	Most Accomplished International Pornstar	Himself	Nominated	
Grabby Europe Awards	2022	Pornstar Of The Year	Himself	Nominated	
Grabby Europe Awards	2022	Best Top	Himself	Nominated	
Grabby Europe Awards	2025	Pornstar Of The Year	Himself	Won	
Grabby Europe Awards	2025	Collaboration of the Year (Note: shared with Alex Ink, and Justin Jett.)	Himself	Won	
Grabby Europe Awards	2026	Best Top	Himself	Nominated	
Grabby Europe Awards	2026	Creator of the Year	Himself	Nominated	
Grabby Europe Awards	2026	Actor of the Year	Himself	Nominated	
Grabby Europe Awards	2026	Most Accomplished Actor of the Year	Himself	Nominated	
Grabby Europe Awards	2026	Social Media Personality of the Year	Himself	Nominated	
Grabby Europe Awards	2026	Creator & Studio: Best Feature Film	The Devil You Know	Nominated	
Grabby Europe Awards	2026	Creator & Studio: Best Feature Film	To the Nines	Won	
Grabby Europe Awards	2026	Creator & Studio: Fan Favourite Film	The Devil You Know	Nominated	
Grabby Europe Awards	2026	Duo Scene of the Year	To the Nines (Note: shared with Dean Young.)	Nominated	
Grabby Europe Awards	2026	Duo Scene of the Year	Fired Up: Cuesta del Sol (Note: shared with Justin Jett.)	Nominated	
Grabby Europe Awards	2026	Duo Scene of the Year	The Whole Package (Note: shared with John Jai.)	Nominated	
PinkX Gay Video Awards	2013	Best Top	Himself	Won	
Prowler Porn Awards	2014	Best British Scene (Note: shared with Johnny Hazzard, and Issac Jones.)	Dark Dreams	Won	
Prowler Porn Awards	2014	Hottest British Porn Star	Himself	Nominated	
Prowler Porn Awards	2014	Best British Stud	Himself	Won	
Prowler Porn Awards	2014	Best British Onscreen Couple (Note: shared with Topher DiMaggio.)	Himself	Nominated	
Prowler Porn Awards	2015	Best British Onscreen Couple (Note: shared with Paul Walker.)	Himself	Won	
Prowler Porn Awards	2016	Best British Stud	Himself	Won	
Prowler Porn Awards	2016	Best British Top	Himself	Nominated	
Prowler Porn Awards	2017	Best British Onscreen Couple (Note: shared with Gabriel Cross.)	Himself	Nominated	
Prowler Porn Awards	2017	Hottest British Porn Star	Himself	Nominated	
Prowler Porn Awards	2017	Best British Top	Himself	Nominated	
Prowler Porn Awards	2017	Best British Scene (Note: shared with Logan Moore.)	Sense 8: A Gay XXX Parody	Won	
Prowler Porn Awards	2017	Best British Stud	Himself	Won	
Prowler Porn Awards	2017	Best British Onscreen Couple (Note: shared with Logan Moore.)	Himself	Nominated	
Prowler Porn Awards	2018	Best European Top	Himself	Won	
Prowler Porn Awards	2019	Best European Top	Himself	Won	
Raven's Eden Awards	2020	Best Condom Performer	Himself	Nominated	
