= Zak Spears =

American gay pornographic film actor

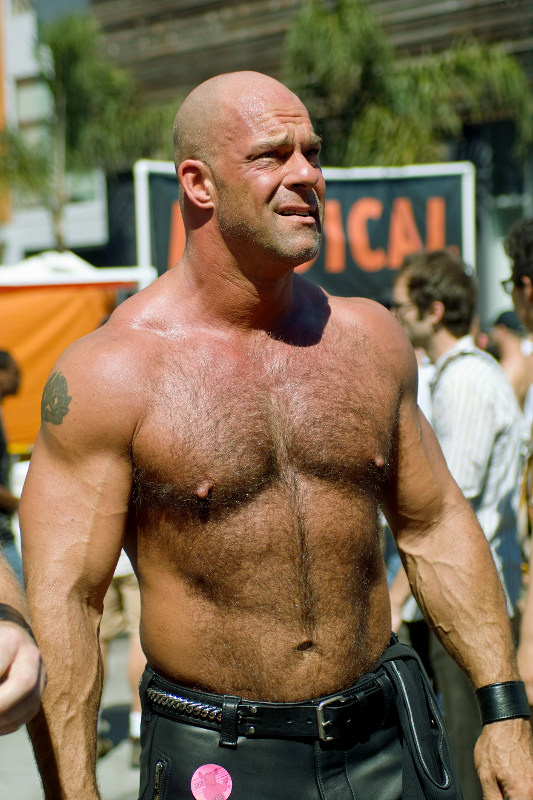
- Spears in 2015
- Born: Khristofor Rossianov; January 15, 1965 (age 61); Chicago, Illinois
- Other name: Zak Spears
- Height: 6 ft 2 in (188 cm)

Zak Spears (born January 15, 1965) is an American gay pornographic film actor. Spears appeared in the feature film The Doom Generation (1995) using his real name, Khristofor Rossianov.

Spears also appeared in the black comedy feature film Forgiving the Franklins (2006) under the name Khris Scaramanga. The film's director, Jay Floyd, said that having Spears in his film helped raise its profile. "I have one star in my movie," Floyd told The Los Angeles Times. "He just happens to be a porn star."

Initially retiring from the industry in 1996, he made a return in 2004 in the film Zak Attack, sporting a dramatic image change which included a shaved head and a much bulkier build.

== Awards ==
=== Grabby Awards ===
- 1993 Best Newcomer
- 1994 Best Actor, a tie with Ty Fox
- 2000 Wall of Fame inductee
- 2004 Best Duo Sex Scene, with Johnny Hazzard in Bolt; tied with Tag Adams and Aiden Shaw in Perfect Fit
- 2004 Best Non-Sex Performance, in Buckleroos Parts I and II

=== GayVN Awards ===
- 2001 Hall of Fame
- 2002 Best Actor, The Joint; tied with Tony Donovan, Carnal Intentions
- 2005 Best Non-Sex Performance, Buckleroos Parts I and II

=== Gay Erotic Video Awards ===
- 1994 Best Actor,
- 1993 Best Cumshot a tie with Grant Larson

=== The "Dave" Awards ===
- 1994 Best Sex Scene, the orgy in The Wild Ones, featured performer along with Wolff

=== Probe/Men in Video Awards ===
- 1997 Porn Legend

=== AVN Awards ===
(The AVN Awards included a gay award category up until 1998; they were separated into the GayVN Awards in 1999.)

- 1994 Best Supporting Actor—Gay Video
- 1994 Best Newcomer—Gay Video

== Partial videography ==
- Unsuitable (2010, Pantheon Productions)
- The Abduction Series, Part II: The Conflict (1993, Falcon Studios)
- The Abduction Series, Part III: Redemption (1993, Falcon Studios)
- Ace in the Hole
- Backstage Pass (Hothouse)
- The Best Of Brad Stone (2007, Falcon Studios)
- The Best of Zak Spears (Falcon Studios)
- Blue Movie (2009, Falcon Studios)
- Bolt
- Boot Black
- Buckleroos (Colt Studio)
- The Coach's Boys (Falcon Studios)
- Double Vision (Falcon Studios)
- The Fluffer
- Hard Body Video Magazine (1993, Odyssey Men Video)
- Hard Cops (Massive)
- Hard Cops 2 (Massive)
- Hologram
- Home Grown (Falcon Studios)
- House Rules (Falcon Studios)
- The Joint
- The Journey Back
- The Look of a Man (Falcon Studios)
- Massive Muscle Bears (Massive)
- Night Watch (Falcon Studios)
- On The Mark (Hot House)
- Posing Strap
- Raw 2: No Limits
- Rivers of Cum
- Secret Sex 2: The Sex Radicals (1994, Catalina Video)
- Sex Crimes
- Solicitor
- Summer Fever (Falcon Studios)
- Sunsex Blvd. (1993, Catalina Video)
- Total Corruption
- Unleashed: The Best of Zak Spears (Massive)
- Wet Palms
- Wide Strokes (Colt Studio)
- The Wild Ones (Tom of Finland)
- Zak Attack (Falcon Studios)

== See also ==
- List of male performers in gay porn films

GayVN Awards Hall of Fame
2001

Awards and achievements
Preceded by B.J. Slater	AVN Awards for Best Newcomer-Gay Video; 1994	Succeeded by Steve Marks
Preceded by Wes Daniels for Songs in the Key of Sex	AVN Awards for Best Supporting Actor-Gay Video for Total Corruption; 1994	Succeeded by Scott Baldwin for Flashpoint
Preceded by Tony Donovan for Echoes	GayVN Awards for Best Actor for The Joint (tie with Tony Donovan for Carnal Intentions); 2002	Succeeded by Caesar / Josh Weston for Cowboy / Deep South: The Big and the Easy
