= Titan Media =

San Francisco-based gay pornographic studio

- Type: Private
- Industry: Gay pornography
- Founded: 1995
- Headquarters: San Francisco, United States
- Products: Pornographic films and internet pornography
- Website: TitanMen.com

Titan Media is an independent San Francisco–based gay pornographic studio founded by director and cinematographer Bruce Cam and Robert Kirsch (1961–2001) in 1995.

== Overview ==
The company grew to become one of the largest producers of gay adult content in the world. According to Cam, the company was created to "Eroticize safer-sex and portray positive gay sexuality, with a wide range of men, set in the panorama of nature." Consequently, all of its films are condoms-only, the company does not film bareback scenes. Titan is owned by parent company Io Group, Inc. The studio has won several gay pornographic film awards.

== History ==
Titan Media was founded in 1995 by Bruce Cam and Robert Kirsch (1961–2001). It has grown to become one of the largest gay porn film studios. In 2001, the company launched a mid-priced product line under the ManPlay brand, and launched a line of products with younger men under the TitanMen Fresh label. In 2005, Titan acquired former gay pornographic studio MSR, and has been re-releasing its old videos on DVD.

In 2005, Titan Media released a film titled Cirque Noir starring Buck Angel, marking the first time a trans man had been featured in an all-male film produced by a company specializing in gay male porn. The decision to cast Buck Angel in a scene has been praised as a "landmark role" in the representation of trans men in gay porn "whose magnitude cannot be understated."

In 2008, they were against a proposed bill by Charles Calderon to increase the California porn tax to 25%.

In 2011, Falcon Studios, Raging Stallion and Titan Media joined with the anti-piracy company Porn Guardian.

== Legal affairs ==
In November 2003 Io Group filed a lawsuit against Larry Flynt Publications alleging copyright infringement. It alleged that 220 Titan Media photographs were published on the LFP owned website StudClub.

In December 2003 the company asked file sharing website Kazaa to block its users from downloading 1,400 of its films. Titan alleged that Kazaa's owner Sharman Networks had the capacity to monitor activity on the network through "spyware" installed on users' computers, and that it could use that capability to block its users from downloading its films. In January 2004 Titan wrote to the Senate Judiciary Committee, complaining that Kazaa had refused to cooperate. Kazaa had told a Senate committee in 2003 that it would improve its content filters to help users avoid offensive material.

In 2007, Titan claimed $2.7 million in damages for copyright infringement and other alleged violations against GayForIt, a video hosting website. In 2008, Titan Media sued Veoh for hosting pirated videos, but the district court ruled Veoh not liable.

In March 2010, Channel 1 Releasing, Corbin Fisher Entertainment and Titan Media/Io Group, filed a $29 million suit against the two operators of three gay pornographic web sites over the alleged infringement of more than 200 videos.

In spring 2010, they won a $1.35 million default judgment against Antelope Media, which operates MonsterCockTube.com. U.S. District Judge Maxine Chesney granted the judgment after the defendants failed to file an opposition. MonsterCockTube.com remains in the ownership of the defendants after Titan Media was refused a turnover order for the domain. No further court action has been taken against Antelope Media. In 2011, their anti-piracy motion was denied by Susan Illston.

The controversial lawyer Marc Randazza has been contracted by Titan Media.

== Video lines ==
- TitanMen, the original line with "...positive gay sexuality, with a wide range of men, set in the panorama of nature."
- TitanMen Fresh, a line of products featuring younger adult models.
- ManPlay, a mid-priced product line launched in 2001.
- MSR, recently acquired product line that Titan is re-releasing as DVDs

== Directors ==
- Bruce Cam
- Harold Creg
- Ray Dragon
- Joe Gage
- Brett Hunt
- Jasun Mark
- Brian Mills
- Paul Wilde

== Exclusive performers ==
Scotch Inkom, Philippe Ferro, Dario Beck, Jessy Ares, Dillon Buck, Tony Buff, Dean Flynn, Alex Baresi, Marco Blaze, David Anthony, JR Matthews, Christopher Saint, Will Parker, Tibor Wolfe, Chad Manning.

== Awards and nominations ==
2010: Best Newcomer (European Union) – Alex Marte (HustlaBall Award)

2009: Best Fetish Film (Grabby Award); GLBT Studio of the Year (XBIZ Award)

2008: ManNet's 12th Annual Best 100 Videos of The Year ; Best Videography & Maleflixxx VOD People's Choice Award (Grabby Award)

2008 XBIZ Award: GLBT Studio of the Year

2009 XBIZ Award: GLBT Studio of the Year

2010 XBIZ Award: Gay Studio of the Year

2011 XBIZ Award: Gay Studio of the Year and Gay Director of the Year (Joe Gage)

2012 XBIZ Award: Gay Studio of the Year

2013 XBIZ Award: Gay Movie of the Year for Incubus Parts 1 & 2 and Gay Director of the Year (Joe Gage)
