= Kurt Marshall =

American actor and model

- Marshall in c. 1984
- Born: James Allen Rideout, Jr. November 13, 1965; Waterville, Maine, U.S.
- Died: October 10, 1988 (aged 22); Los Angeles, California, U.S.

Kurt Marshall (born James Allen Rideout, Jr.; November 13, 1965 – October 10, 1988) was an American model and actor who performed in gay pornographic films in the mid-1980s. Although he appeared in only four films, the gay pornographic industry trade publication Unzipped named him one of the top 100 gay porn stars of all time in 2006, author Leigh Rutledge listed him as the ninth most influential gay porn star of all time in 2000, and adult film magazine editor John Erich called him one of the "most beautiful" gay adult film stars of the 1980s.

== Early life ==
Kurt Marshall was born James Rideout, Jr. in Waterville, Maine, one of 15 children. After high school, where he lettered in swimming and track and field), he attended San Francisco State University, but never finished. He said in several interviews that he performed in adult films in order to earn money for college.

== Adult film career ==
In 1984, at the age of 18, he starred in his first film, Matt Sterling's Sizing Up, with fellow gay adult film star Mark Miller. His role was that of a star track and field athlete, which echoed his high school sports experiences. A historian of gay erotic film called Sizing Up a "superior example of [a] gay porn video which make[s] gay men visible in places where they have mostly been invisible..." He made three films the following year, all for Falcon Studios: the highly influential The Other Side of Aspen II, Splash Shots, and Night Flight. The Other Side of Aspen II was Falcon's first film which was shot entirely on video, and Marshall worked with legendary gay adult film performer Scott O'Hara. O'Hara later wrote in his autobiography that he was not in the least attracted to Marshall, although much of the film was later edited to make it appear as if he was having an intense sexual experience with him and two other blond men. Adult Video News (AVN), the adult film industry trade publication, later rated the film as the ninth most innovative and influential gay porn film of all time in 2005. Marshall's second film, Splash Shots, was credited with making sex around the swimming pool a gay porn trope.

Assessing his career, Unzipped magazine editorialized that "the films he appeared in were noteworthy."

Marshall was an advocate for gay rights, once telling an interviewer:

I think to be gay is to be blessed. We have so much freedom, so many choices. This isn't our moment to party or to think we're going to stay young forever … maybe it's our time to find someone to be safe with … to be happy with …

== Death ==
Marshall, an admitted drug user, tested positive for HIV in 1986. He came out to his family that same year and entered a drug rehabilitation program. He moved to San Diego, California, in 1987, but returned to Los Angeles later that same year, and worked in the construction industry. He died on October 10, 1988, at Hollywood Presbyterian Medical Center. The official cause of death was kidney failure due to substance abuse and AIDS.

== Videography ==
- Sizing Up: Before Your Very Eyes (1984)
- Splash Shots: Memories of Summer (1984)
- Night Flight (1985)
- The Other Side of Aspen 2 (1985)

== See also ==
- List of male performers in gay porn films
