= Philipp Tanzer =

German men's rights activist (born 1977)

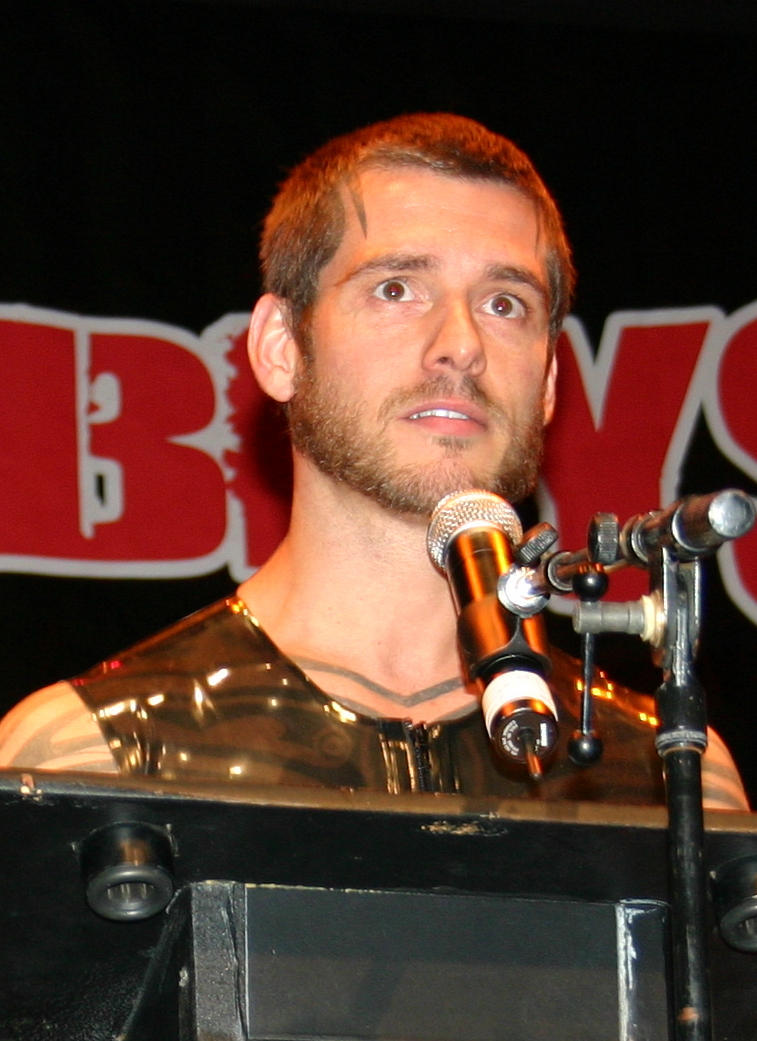
- Tanzer in 2009
- Born: 31 December 1977 (age 48)
- Other names: Logan McCree; DJ Krieger
- Political party: Scottish Family Party
- Children: 2

Philipp Tanzer (born 31 December 1977) is a German men's rights activist and former adult entertainer in gay films, in which he performed under the stage name Logan McCree.

After serving in the German military, Tanzer was part of the leather subculture in Germany. He began working with the adult entertainment company Raging Stallion Studios in the mid-2000s and became popular with both audiences and critics, being named Performer of the Year at the 2009 GayVN Awards and Gay Performer of the Year at the 2010 XBIZ Awards. He was known in the industry for his heavily tattooed body, which he views as an expression of his spiritual beliefs.

Following his retirement from the industry in 2012, Tanzer moved to Balnakeil in the Scottish Highlands and became involved in community life there. He later joined the men's rights movement and unsuccessfully ran for election in the Scottish Parliament as a member of the Scottish Family Party. He disavows his former career, and has spoken against pornography addiction and LGBT education in schools.

== Early life ==
Philipp Tanzer was born on 31 December 1977. When he was sixteen years old, his mother was killed in a murder-suicide by her husband. According to Tanzer, he and his brother were listening on the phone while this happened.

Tanzer served in the Bundeswehr as a medic. Part of the leather scene, he won the 2004 German Mr. Leather competition and then entered that year's International Mr. Leather contest, reaching the semi-finals.

== Pornographic career ==
In the mid-2000s, Tanzer signed an exclusive contract with Raging Stallion Studios. He picked his own stage name, with "Logan" being a homage to Scotland and the Marvel Comics character Wolverine (commonly known as Logan). His surname alludes to his love for God, "McCree" deriving from Scottish Gaelic words meaning "son of the king". In September 2007, Raging Stallion president Chris Ward and Screaming Eagle XXX owner Jake Deckard announced the latter company's first production, an adult film titled Ink Storm starring McCree alongside other heavily tattooed performers.

=== 2008 ===
In 2008, McCree starred in the Raging Stallion Studios film The 4th Floor alongside Roman Ragazzi. Ben Leon, the director of the film, described their scene as "by far the best scene I have shot with Roman". McCree received a nomination for Best Solo Sex Scene at the 2009 Grabby Awards for his work. He then starred in the two-part film Hotter Than Hell, taking part in a threesome with Dak Ramsey and Tober Brandt in the second part. They were nominated for Best Threeway and Best Threesome at the 2009 Grabby and GayVN awards shows respectively. He later starred in Jock Itch, a sports-themed adult film directed by and starring Jake Deckard.

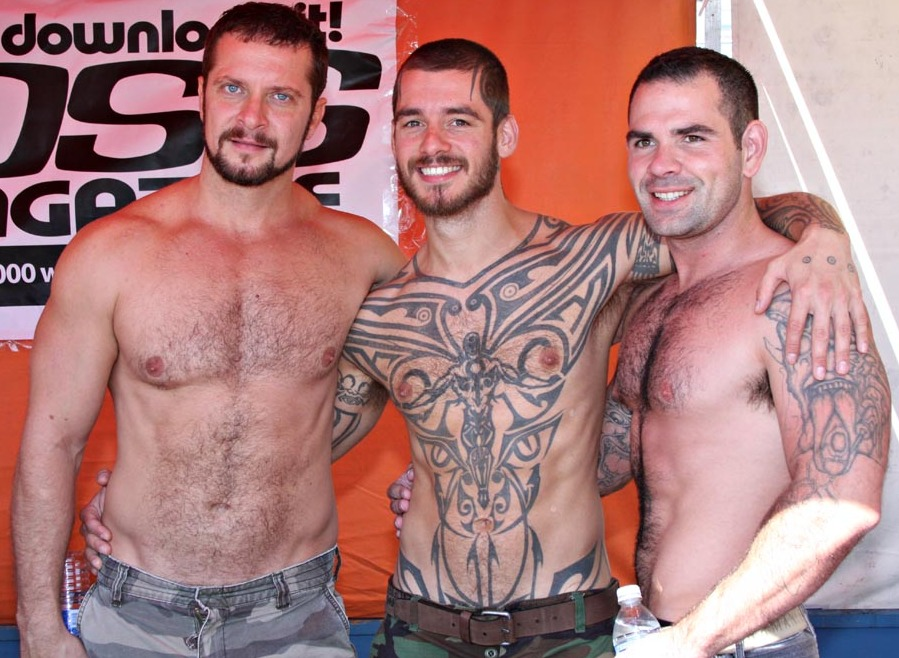
McCree (centre) with colleagues Vinnie D'Angelo (left) and Dak Ramsey (right) in 2008

McCree starred in Raging Stallion's pornographic western film To the Last Man, based on the novel of the same name. The film ends with a graphic and bloody shootout, and features a simulated rape scene in which McCree and Ricky Sinz's characters assault the character played by Scott Tanner. The film faced some controversy due to its graphic violence and depiction of sexual assault, but its creators ensured that a non-violent version of the film would be available when released on DVD. McCree, Sinz and Tanner later received the Best Threeway award at the 2009 Grabby Awards and Best Threesome at the GayVN Awards for their scene. McCree was also nominated for Best Sex Scene (Duo) alongside co-star Scott Campbell. Another award-winning film, The Drifter, starred McCree alongside Vinnie D'Angelo. His character, a German visitor to Canada, undergoes a journey of self-discovery in the wilderness after learning that his boyfriend has been having an affair. The film won Best Movie at the 2009 Grabby Awards, with McCree winning Best Actor, Best Screenplay and sharing Best Duo with D'Angelo. At the GayVN Awards, McCree and D'Angelo won Best Sex Scene (Duo) and McCree was nominated for Best Actor and Best Screenplay.

=== 2009 ===
In March 2009, McCree was named Performer of the Year at the GayVN Awards. The following month, the website NakedSword added him to their "dream team", featuring him on a special section of their website alongside other performers recognised by the company as fan favourites. NakedSword chief executive Tim Valenti wrote that McCree "lends an underground, bad-ass energy to the raw sexuality of mainstream porn".

In 2009, McCree starred in Porn Stars in Love, which featured a fictionalised account of his real life sexual experiences with Vinnie D'Angelo. He later starred in Rear Deliveries, a film based on Raging Stallion's distribution warehouse, and Ink Stain, which focused on his heavily tattooed body. McCree also starred in Port of Entry, a pornographic film featuring sex scenes between bikers, sailors and dockworkers. The same year, McCree starred in the sci-fi pornographic film The Visitor as Epoc, an alien researcher who is unable to physically interact with his human subjects as he explores the Castro, a well-known gay neighbourhood in San Francisco. Soon after its release, Raging Stallion reported that it had reached the top of their sales chart, with studio president Chris Ward calling McCree "the top porn star in the industry today". McCree later received the GayVN Best Actor award for his role in the film.

=== 2010 onwards ===
In 2010, he starred opposite Jack Dragon in a film called Logan vs. Dragon, the second in a series of Dragon projects by Elite Male studios. In the same year, McCree and Tyler Saint were named joint winners of the Gay Performer of the Year award at the XBIZ Awards. The following year, McCree starred in the Raging Stallion film Giants alongside prominent performers such as Wilfried Knight.

In the early 2010s, McCree created his own pornographic films and published them online. In 2012, McCree left the adult entertainment industry. He has been featured on several Raging Stallion Studios compilation DVDs, including The Best of Steve Cruz, Vol. 1 (2009), Inkboyz #1 (2010) and The Best of Ricky Sinz, Vol. 1 (2010).

== Political career and views ==
In April 2021, Tanzer announced that he was running for election to the Scottish Parliament as a member of the Scottish Family Party, a self-described "pro-family, pro-marriage [and] pro-life" group. He stood in the May 2021 election as a list candidate in the Highlands and Islands region. His party received 1,976 votes and he was not elected. He later ran unsuccessfully in the 2022 Highland Council election, seeking to represent the North, West and Central Sutherland ward.

Tanzer describes himself as usually being a centrist, but says he feels forced to take strong views on issues due to his belief that "too much liberalism" has been damaging in the past. While being interviewed on RT UK, he said he was becoming more socially conservative.

=== LGBT rights ===
Tanzer has complained on social media against "LGBT indoctrination" within education and religion, as well as alleged focuses on Black Lives Matter and "radical environmental activism". The Scottish Family Party has called for education into "the correlations between homosexual relationships and physical and mental health problems" and their leader, Richard Lucas, has drawn comparisons between incest and same-sex marriage. Tanzer has praised the party's stance on a form of sex education which he claims "focuses too much on pornography and certain sexualities".

=== Men's rights ===
Tanzer had an interest in child custody issues, and later became involved in the men's rights movement.

In 2018, Tanzer attended the International Conference on Men's Issues (ICMI) in London. In October 2019, Tanzer featured in the BBC Radio 4 programme Into the Manosphere, following his journey from Scotland to Chicago for that year's ICMI event. The same journey was later featured in the April 2020 BBC Three documentary I Am a Men's Rights Activist. In 2020, Tanzer founded the group Gender Parity UK, which fights against alleged discrimination against men and boys. In November of that year, the group held a march in Edinburgh alongside the group Split the Difference, with Tanzer calling for more public discussion about "men's mental health, suicide, homelessness, custody issues, male victims of abuse and other issues men face". He considers himself a supporter of gender equality, but criticizes what he sees as modern feminism moving away from egalitarianism. The following year, the ICMI reported that Tanzer would be a featured speaker, representing Gender Parity UK and participating in a Q&A session with Carl Benjamin. The two had previously shown support of each other, with Tanzer calling Benjamin "a really, really nice guy".

=== Pornography ===
After retiring from adult films, the Daily Mail quoted Tanzer as saying that he had always held negative views of the industry, reporting that he said to only have worked in pornography because he "needed the money". When discussing the straight porn industry, he said: "Although I haven't made straight porn, we shared a set a couple of times and I saw men being treated like shit by women performers. They were being screamed at and told exactly what they could and couldn't do". However, he has talked positively about his personal experiences making pornography, describing his colleagues as a supportive family.

Tanzer has stated that he lost several colleagues to suicide and drug overdoses. He has also spoken out against porn addiction and the negative effects that pornography can have on children and adults.

=== Religion ===
Tanzer has stated that he did not have a religious upbringing, but was independently spiritual as a child, feeling that he was "not 100% human" and was in fact part angel, giving him a strong spiritual connection with them. In a 2010 interview with Boyz, he described himself as a Christian, but said that "most Christians probably wouldn't call me one". Tanzer has actively spoken about his tattoos as a symbol of his spirituality, including: a feather, representing freedom; a Capricorn symbol; a wolf, his "spiritual guiding animal"; Saint Michael the Archangel; and the symbol used by Prince.

== Personal life ==
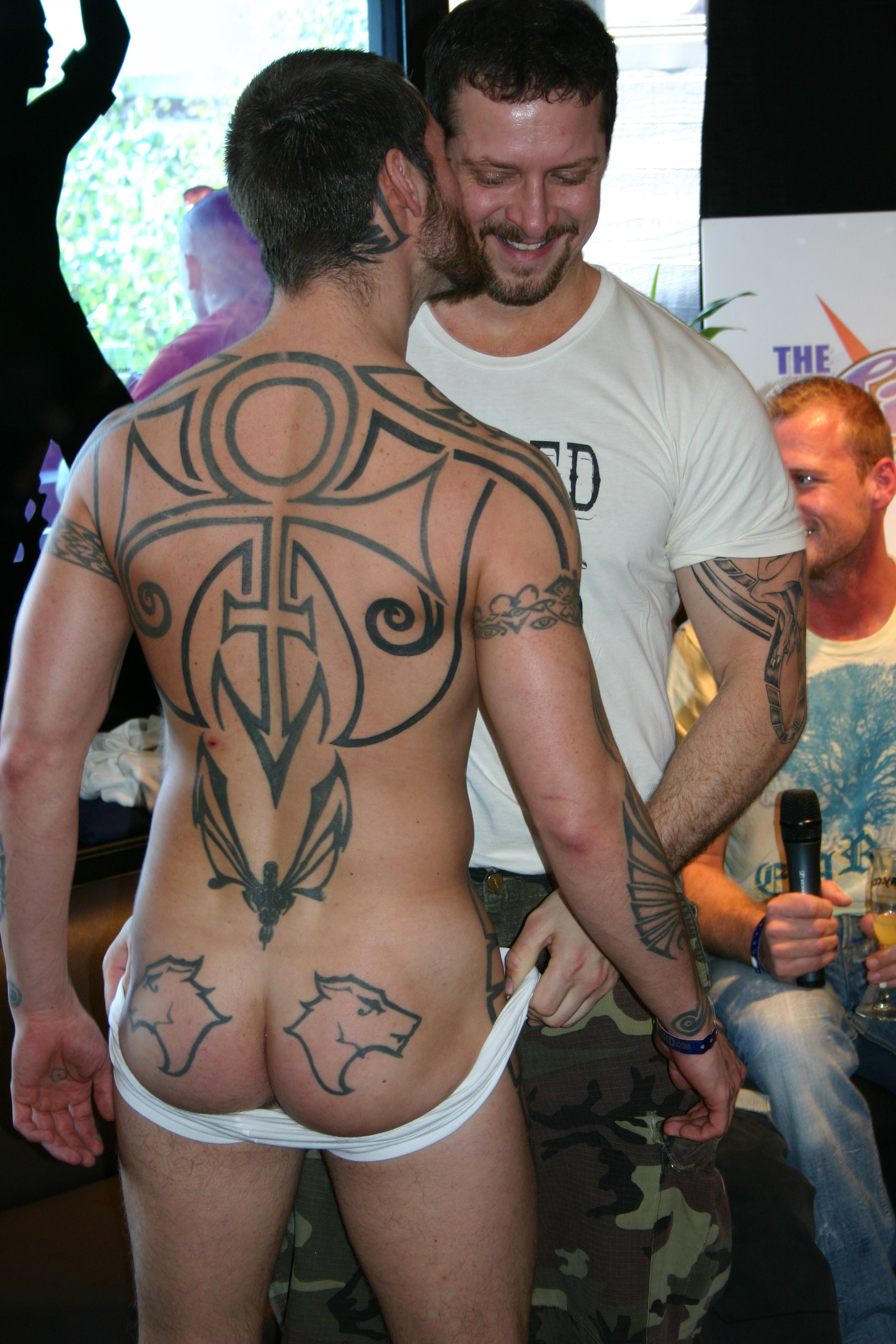
Tanzer (left) and Vinnie D'Angelo (right) in 2009. The two men were in a relationship during the late 2000s.

In 2012, Tanzer moved from Dresden in Germany to the village of Balnakeil in the Scottish Highlands. He had frequently visited Scotland on wild camping holidays with a military friend and said that he "feel[s] at home" in the area. While living in the village, he built his own house and lived without water or electricity during the construction process. He planned to open a hair salon and massage parlour, and later worked as a hair stylist and firefighter. As of 2018, he runs an art gallery in the area.

In 2021, he was working as an artist, hairdresser and massage therapist. He was described in The Times as a "popular figure" within the Durness area, running the Durness Highland Halloween Festival.

Tanzer has also worked as a disc jockey, using the name DJ Krieger. According to Ben Chasny, who wrote and performed the soundtrack for The Drifter, Tanzer DJ'd the film's launch event in Italy.

=== Sexuality ===
During the late 2000s, Tanzer was in a relationship with fellow performer Vinnie D'Angelo. After beginning to date women again in his thirties, Tanzer faced criticism from fans and accusations of being gay-for-pay. He had recently ended a long-term relationship with a man and rejected the gay-for-pay label. In a 2018 interview with Vice, Tanzer said that he had never identified as gay, due to feeling disconnected from gay culture, and that he had previously identified as "asexual but with a preference for men".

In a 2010 interview, Tanzer stated a lack of emotional interest in having sex, saying that "sex is mostly just about lust and trying to get rid of that sexual pressure". Speaking to Vice in 2018, he expressed his strong desires to start a relationship and family with a woman. In 2021, Tanzer identified as heterosexual and was in a relationship with a woman. By November 2024, he had two daughters.

== Filmography ==
=== Pornographic films ===
Year	Title	Ref.
2007	Ink Storm	
2008	The 4th Floor	
2008	Hotter Than Hell	
2008	Jock Itch	
2008	To the Last Man	
2008	The Drifter	
2009	Porn Stars in Love	
2009	Rear Deliveries	
2009	Ink Stain	
2009	Port of Entry	
2009	The Visitor	
2010	Logan vs. Dragon	
2011	Giants	

=== Television ===
Year	Title	Role	Notes	Ref.
2020	I Am a Men's Rights Activist	Himself	Documentary film	

== Awards ==
Year	Ceremony	Award	Nominated work	Result
2004	—N/a	German Mr. Leather	—N/a	Won
2004	—N/a	International Mr. Leather	—N/a	Nominated
2009	Grabby Award	Best Solo Sex Scene	The 4th Floor	Nominated
2009	Grabby Award	Best Threeway; with Dak Ramsey and Tober Brandt	Hotter Than Hell 2	Nominated
2009	GayVN Award	Best Threesome; with Dak Ramsey and Tober Brandt	Hotter Than Hell 2	Nominated
2009	Grabby Award	Best Actor	The Drifter	Won
2009	Grabby Award	Best Screenplay	The Drifter	Won
2009	GayVN Award	Best Screenplay	The Drifter	Nominated
2009	Grabby Award	Best Duo; with Vinnie D'Angelo	The Drifter	Won
2009	GayVN Award	Best Sex Scene (Duo); with Vinnie D'Angelo	The Drifter	Won
2009	GayVN Award	Best Actor	The Drifter	Nominated
2009	Grabby Award	Best Threeway; with Ricky Sinz and Scott Tanner	To the Last Man	Won
2009	GayVN Award	Best Threesome; with Ricky Sinz and Scott Tanner	To the Last Man	Won
2009	GayVN Award	Best Sex Scene (Duo); with Scott Campbell	To the Last Man	Nominated
2009	GayVN Award	Performer of the Year	—N/a	Won
2010	GayVN Award	Best Actor	The Visitor	Won
2010	XBIZ Award	Gay Performer of the Year; joint winner with Tyler Saint	—N/a	Won
