= Grabby Awards =

Pornographic film award

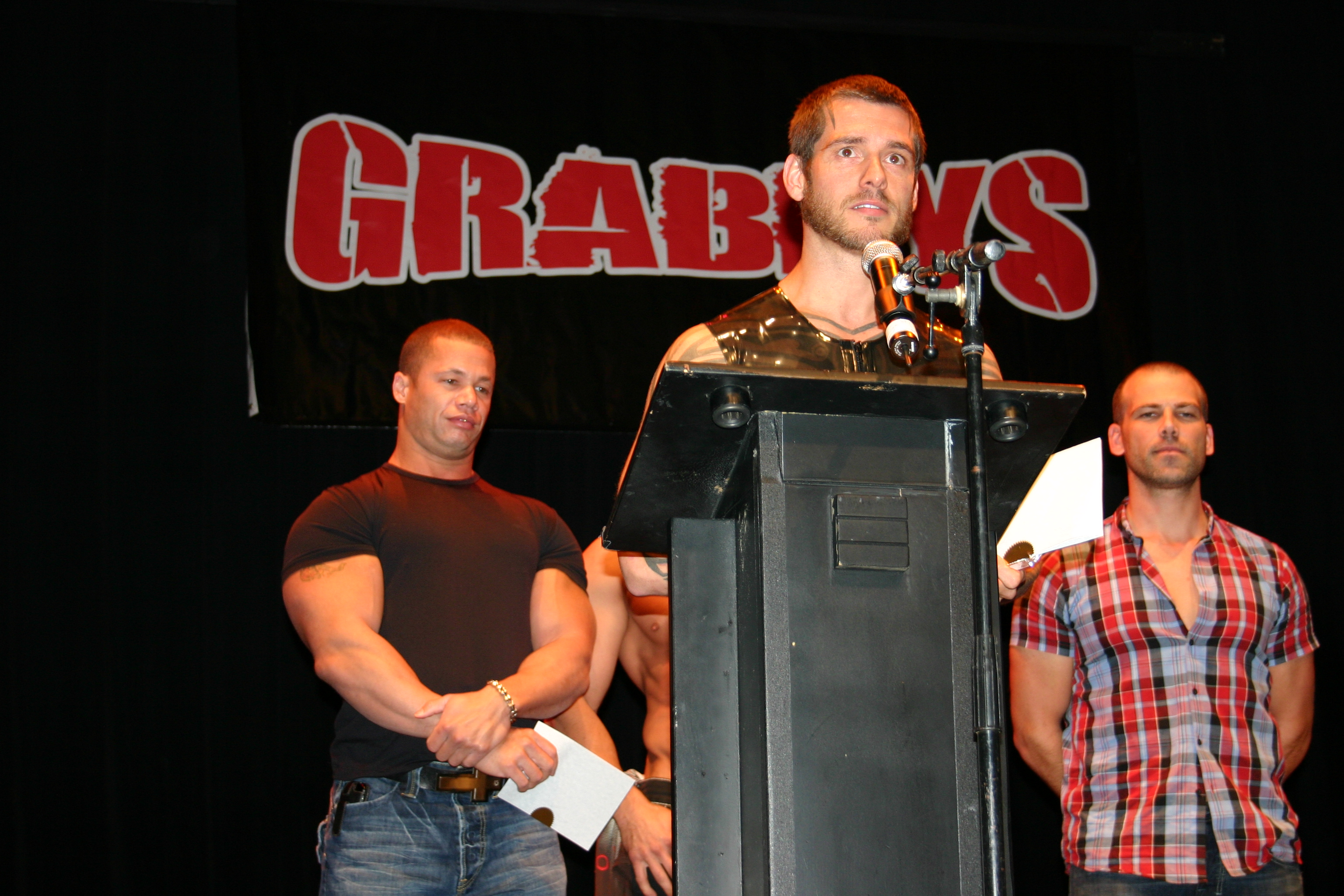
Left to right— Matthew Rush, Logan McRee, and Jason Ridge; at Grabby Awards 2009

Grabby Awards (better known as The Grabbys) are presented annually in Chicago for the gay adult erotic video industry. The awards are sponsored by GRAB Magazine. The Grabby Awards and GRAB Magazine are owned and operated by Grabbys, LLC. The awards were owned until 2009 by Gay Chicago Magazine. The first awards were listed in the year-end issue of Gay Chicago Magazine in 1991, and the first awards ceremony was held in 1999.

== GRAB Magazine ==
GRAB
- Categories: LGBT
- First issue: 2009
- Company: Grabbys, LLC
- Country: Chicago, Illinois, United States
- Website: grabchicago.com

GRAB is a Chicago, Illinois, LGBT entertainment magazine. The biweekly publication is distributed free in the Chicago area. Founded in 2009 by Stacy Bridges and Mark Nagel. GRAB organizes the annual Grabby Awards (better known as The Grabbys) for the gay pornography industry. Both GRAB magazine and the Grabby Awards are owned and operated by Grabbys, LLC.

== Beginnings ==
The first Grabby Awards (formally known as Adult Erotic Gay Video Awards) were given in 1991, when the awards were listed in the year-end issue of Gay Chicago Magazine. Awards given that year included "Burnout of the Year", "Comeback of the Year", "Fresh Surprise of the Year", "Best Supporting Actor", "Best Newcomer", and "Best Overall Performer". According to "Big Daddy" Ferguson, founder of Gay Chicago Magazine and creator of the awards, the Grabbys are "...our way of highlingting [sic] certain aspects of the past year's videos that, in our opinion, are worth[y] of special notice."

The award's second year, 1992, saw the addition of some more traditional award categories, such as "Best Video of the Year" and "Best Screenplay"; "Best Overall Performer" was shortened to "Best Performer". The unique awards continued, however, with the presentation of the "Pull-Lister Prize", given to Gay Sex: A Manual for Men Who Love Men.

In 1993, the third annual awards included "Best Ethnic Performer" and "Best Cum Shot", and saw the first tie for an award, that of Falcon Studios and Kristen Bjorn Productions for "Best Video of the Year".

"Best Director" was added in 1994, along with "Best International Video", "Best Cinematography", "Best Sex Scene", "Best Bisexual Video", and the "Whopper Award", presented to a Canadian performer.

"Best Cum Shot" was renamed "Hot Shots", the only change in award categories for 1995. The 1996 awards included the addition of "Best Non-Sexual Role" and "Promising New Performers"; there were no additions or name changes for the 1997 awards.

== First award ceremony ==
Held on Saturday, May 29, 1999, the 1998 Grabbys were presented during an awards ceremony for the first time during the Memorial Day weekend. Chicago had been home to the International Mister Leather Contest (IML) for 20 years, and the founder of IML, Chuck Renslow, suggested that the Grabbys be added to the weekend's activities to provide additional entertainment for the IML attendees.

The ceremony was a fundraiser for the Reimer Foundation, "a nonprofit corporation that promotes safer sex".

The first live show took place in the Music Hall of Man's Country, a gay bathhouse in Chicago's Andersonville neighborhood. The event drew a capacity crowd. Fans, gay "adult male erotic performers", directors, other industry people, and national media came from all over the United States to attend. Well-known Chicago performer Honey West and prominent porn director Chi Chi LaRue served as co-hostesses for the evening's festivities.

Ferguson addressed the audience during the inaugural live presentation of the awards. Encouraged by his friend Mickey Skee from AVN Magazine, Ferguson wanted to create an awards show in the Midwest that would rival the shows organized by Mickey in the West, while offering a unique experience that would attract stars to attend all of them. The award categories were expanded once again, introducing new categories or subdivisions of existing ones. Some of the changes included the addition of categories such as "Best Video: Romance", "Best Video: All Sex", "Best Video: Fantasy", "Best Actor: Dramatic", "Best Actor: Action Hero", "Best Duo Sex Scene", "Best Group Scene", "Best Ethnic Video", "Best Fetish Video", and "Best Leather Video".

Unlike the similar Gay Video News (GayVN) Awards, which are open only by invitation to participants and journalists, tickets for the Grabbys are available for public purchase, allowing fans and performers to mingle and network directly. The event also includes a "People's Choice" category, though other awards are given by a committee selected by the magazine. Additionally, the Grabbys show X-rated video clips of the nominations, while the GayVN Awards do not.

The show also saw the creation of a "Wall of Fame" to honor industry legends, awarded for their impact on the industry rather than the length of time they had been involved in it. Relative newcomers to the industry Ken Ryker, performer, industry critic and author Mickey Skee from Adult Video News and Bob East, the Executive Director of the Men of Odyssey Studio, were inducted alongside long-time directors Jim Steel, Toby Ross, and co-hostess Chi Chi LaRue. Ferguson" was also inducted into the "Wall of Fame" despite his protests; his staff insisted that he be honored as the creator of the awards.

LaRue also won awards for "Best Ethnic Video" and tied with Kristen Bjorn for "Best Videos". Commenting on the award for "Best Ethnic Video", LaRue remarked, "With 10 hot black studs and a white bottom boy, how can you miss?"

For the 1999 Grabbys, additional awards for "Best Actor: Fantasy", "Best Actor: Romance", "Best Screenplay: Fantasy", "Best Screenplay: Romance"; "Best Solo Scene", "Best Threeway Sex Scene", and "Best Twink Video" were added. Once again, LaRue and West were the co-hostesses. The award ceremony, held over the Memorial Day Weekend of 2000, also included a surprise appearance by comedian Judy Tenuta, in town doing promotional work. She delighted the crowd and, as Ferguson remarked in his report on the event, "it was a great treat to have her come out to support the gay porn industry. People like that have a lot of class, because they risk a lot to come to these events, and God love 'em, if they're gonna support us, I'm gonna support them!"

== Evolution ==
For the 2000 awards, Zak Spears and another person were added as co-hosts with Honey and Chi Chi. The awards moved from the prior shows' location, Man's Country, to the Circuit nightclub, in the heart of the Lakeview, Chicago Northalsted district, known as Chicago's "Boystown". Award title changes / additions included "Best Actor" (with no other qualifiers), "Best Comedy Video", "Best Newcomer: Director", "Best Video of the Year" simplified to "Best Video", "Best Videography", and the debut of Editor's Choice Awards: "Documentary", "DVD—Classic", and "DVD—Extras".

Due to the change in location, there was more clothing visible than in past years and the closing orgy was omitted. However, Jeff Stryker, on his way to sign the "Wall of Fame", managed to "lose" his bathrobe and strut across the stage naked—his body well-oiled— and proceeded to stroke his erection for the appreciative crowd. Chi Chi LaRue exclaimed, "OK, we're all going to jail!"

For the first time, the Trophy Studs for the 2001 awards were selected during the previous few months at events at Chicago's Lucky Horseshoe nightclub. The evening's ceremony, held again at the Circuit nightclub, included Editor's Choice Awards for "Classic Movie Remake", "Best International Screenplay", "Best International Actor", and "Best International Director".

The award titles continued to change for the 2002 awards: "Best Solo Scene" became "Best Solo Performance"; "Best DVD Extras" (previously an Editor's Choice Award) was added to the regular list of awards along with "Best Classic DVD". The Editor's Choice Awards for the year were "Best Bisexual Video", "Best Reviewer Promo Package", and "Special Achievement Award", presented to Bob East, Executive Director of the by-then defunct Men of Odyssey Studio. The event took place on May 24, 2003, at the Circuit nightclub for the third year in a row, and was once again hosted by Chi Chi LaRue and Honey West. They were joined by Kelly Love and their male co-hosts Matthew Rush and Kyle Kennedy. The show was interpreted for the hearing impaired by a porn newcomer. Jason Sechrest, of JasonCurious.com, was on hand to present a gift basket of several types of sexual lubricant to super-bottom performer Bret Wolfe.

The 2003 award ceremony was held at the Park West theater on May 29, 2004, moving to a well-known professional concert / event venue. The perennial Chi Chi LaRue and Honey West were joined in co-hosting duties by Chris Steele, Michael Brandon, and Bret Wolfe, with sign language interpretation again provided by Dillon Press. Awards added to the year's gathering were surprise awards "Hottest Cock", "Hottest Ass", "Hottest Versatile Performer", and "Hottest Cum Shots". The Editor's Choice Award for the year was for "Hot New Directors".

Jason Sechrest was in attendance again to present the basket of lube and was joined by the previous year's recipient, Bret Wolfe. The basket was presented to the individual they felt was "most likely to use this entire basket" in the very near future. The recipient, Michael Knight, was called to the stage and the popular bottom thanked "the endless number of inches who have entered me".

A return to the Park West for the 2004 awards brought Honey West and Chi Chi LaRue together with co-hosts Tag Adams, Michael Brandon, and Zak Spears for host / hostess duties. The "Best Video" award was apparently renamed "Best Gay Video"; the "Hottest" awards from the previous year remained, and the "Maleflixx.tv Peoples Choice Award" was added. There were no Editor's Choice Awards.

On May 27, 2006, the 2005 Erotic Gay Video Awards—the "Grabbys"—were presented at The Vic Theatre. Chi Chi LaRue and Honey West once again led the ceremonies; their male co-hosts for the event were Rod Barry, Brad Benton, and Chad Hunt. This was the last Grabbys attended by "Big Daddy" Ferguson, the founder of Gay Chicago Magazine and the Grabbys; Ralph Paul "Big Daddy" died in June 2006 a couple of days after his 72nd Birthday.

== Transition in 2009 ==
In 2009 Gay Chicago Magazine decided to stop reviewing gay porn videos, and dropped the Grabbys. Former Gay Chicago publisher Stacy Bridges, in a deal to sell his portion of the magazine, took ownership of the awards show along with former Gay Chicago Sales Manager Mark Nagel. Bridges and Nagel also founded Grab Magazine in Chicago.

On January 5, 2009, for the first time ever, the Grabbys allowed fans the chance to vote for their preferred porn star co-host. On February 2, 2009, the top ten nominees to join Chi Chi LaRue, Honey West, Blake Riley and Brent Corrigan as co-host were announced. The finalists were: Steve Cruz, R.J. Danvers, Wolf Hudson, Trevor Knight, Nash Lawler, Collin O'Neal, Erik Rhodes, Jason Ridge, Giovanni Summers and Jackson Wild. Soon afterwards, Knight dropped out of the race due to having co-hosted the previous year, as well as Wild for undisclosed reasons. On March 10, 2009, Hudson won the competition, becoming the first ever fan-selected co-host of the Grabbys Awards and the last of the 2000s (decade). Jeremy Bilding was the second selected co-host in 2010 and the first of the 2010s decade. 2009 also marked the first year the Grabbys had an official host hotel, The Hard Rock Hotel Chicago. In 2016 the official host hotel moved from the Hard Rock to the Fairmont Chicago where it is currently.

== List of previous co-hosts ==
Chi Chi LaRue and Honey West have hosted the awards every year since 1999. In 2000 and afterwards, they hosted alongside porn stars. Since 2009, fans have been able to vote for one porn star co-host.

- 2000

Cole Tucker

- 2001

Zak Spears

- 2002

Christian Taylor

- 2003

Matthew Rush

- 2004

Michael Brandon
Chris Steele
Bret Wolfe

- 2005

Tag Adams

- 2006

Rod Barry
Brad Benton
Chad Hunt

- 2007

Johnny Hazzard
Kent North
Matthew Rush

- 2008

Jake Deckard

- 2009

Blake Riley
Brent Corrigan
Wolf Hudson – fan-selected

- 2010

Diesel Washington
Roman Heart
Jeremy Bilding – fan selected

- 2011

Shane Frost – fans selected

- 2012

Adam Killian

== See also ==
- GayVN Awards
- Discontinued gay pornography awards
- Gay Erotic Video Awards
- List of male performers in gay porn films
