= Adam Ramzi =

American pornographic actor and artist

- Born: November 17, 1981 (age 44); Los Angeles, California, U.S.

Aram Kirakosian, better known as Adam Ramzi, is an Armenian-American pornographic actor.

== Biography ==
Ramzi grew up in east Los Angeles County.

In 2013, Ramzi played the bass guitar for indie rock band Io Echo's debut album, Ministry of Love.

While he was attending graduate school for psychology, Ramzi's career in pornography began when he was contacted by Chris Ward, the president of Raging Stallion Studios.

Beginning in 2013, Ramzi portrayed the character of Vardan in the web series EastSiders.

In 2018, Ramzi performed live with Kurtis Wolfe at the Nob Hill Theatre in San Francisco.

In October 2023, Ramzi was featured in Stories Untold: Meet Queer SWANA Sex Workers and Drag Performers, a documentary about queer SWANA sex workers and drag performers, which debuted at One Institute's "Circa: Queer Histories Festival".

Ramzi has also practiced as a psychologist.

== Filmography ==
=== Film ===
Year	Title	Role	Notes
2023	Stories Untold: Meet Queer SWANA Sex Workers and Drag Performers	Himself	

=== Television ===
Year	Title	Role	Notes
2012–17	EastSiders	Vardan	Recurring role
