= Chi Chi LaRue =

American film director

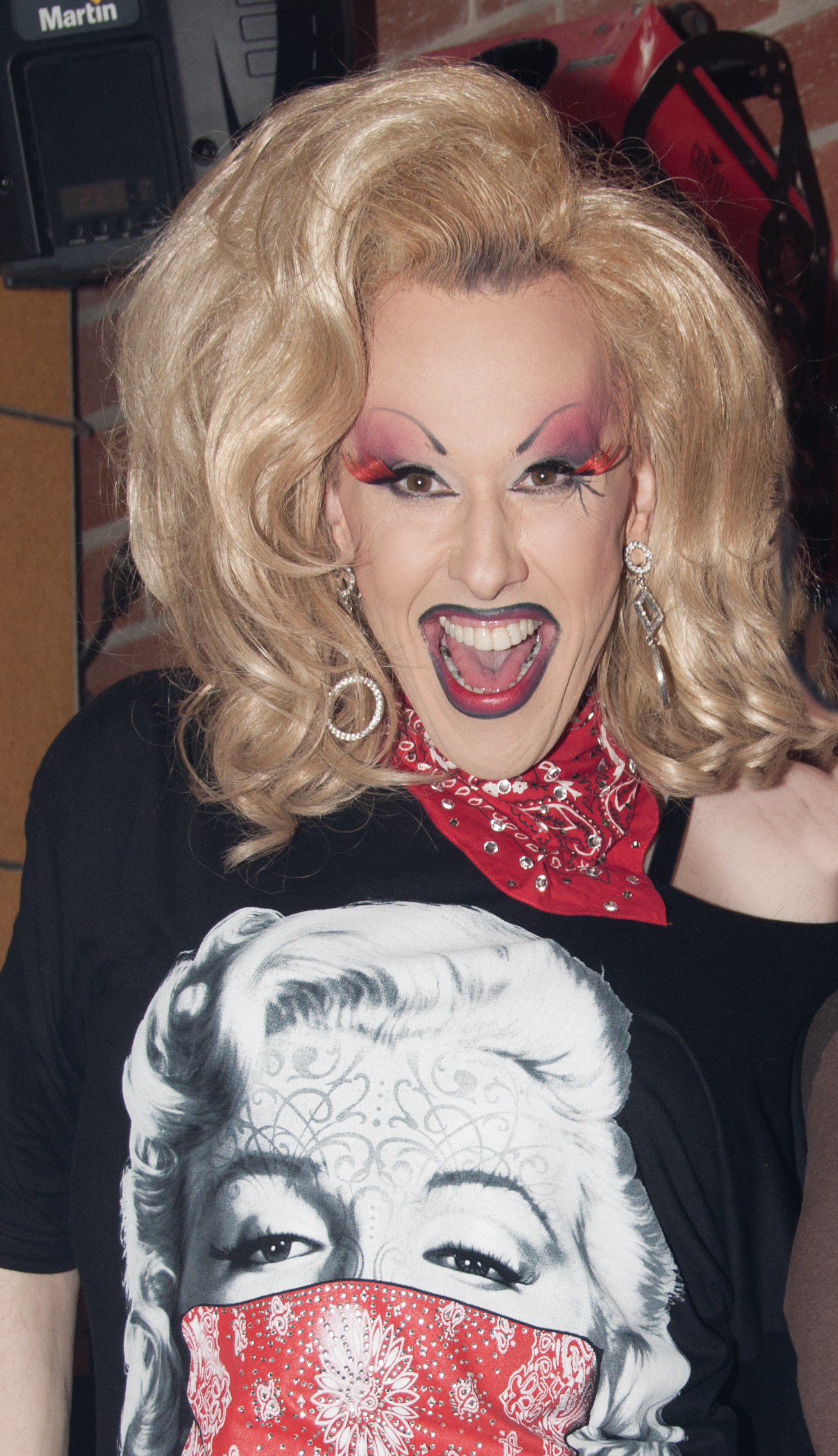
- LaRue in West Hollywood in 2011
- Born: Larry David Paciotti; November 8, 1959 (age 66); Hibbing, Minnesota, U.S.
- Other names: Lawrence David; Taylor Hudson
- Occupation: Pornographic film director
- Website: chichilarue.com

Larry David Paciotti (born November 8, 1959) is an American director of pornographic films. He appears as the drag-diva persona Chi Chi LaRue (/ˈtʃiːtʃiː ləˈruː/), and has been credited as director under the names "Lawrence David" and "Taylor Hudson".

== Career ==
Paciotti began performing as "Chi Chi LaRue" when he moved to the Minneapolis-Saint Paul area and started performing in drag as one-half of "The Weather Gals", a "hag drag" revue. He and a friend moved to California, where LaRue was hired by Catalina Video as an administrative assistant and publicist because of his knowledge of porn and the workings of the porn industry. Even as a "DJ" ("DJ Paciotti"), Paciotti conducts most public business as "Chi Chi LaRue", particularly in the pornographic film industry. LaRue has directed hundreds of gay porn films since 1988, mainly for Falcon Studios. He now owns Catalina Video, a label under his umbrella company Channel 1 Releasing.

In 2003, LaRue began to divide his directorial attention between two porn studios: Vivid Video, where he worked with Jenna Jameson and Tera Patrick, and his own Rascal Video.

In March 2004, LaRue was preparing to leave to travel to London to direct Taking Flight when he had a mild heart attack. Instead of abandoning the production, Falcon hired Chris Steele, the script's author, to direct. In 2005, LaRue shot his last film for Falcon, called Heaven to Hell. It was the only movie ever to be cast of Falcon exclusives.

In 2006, LaRue announced that he would no longer produce films for Vivid Video because they were featuring actors and actresses having sex without condoms.

In 2007, LaRue was chosen as one of Out magazine's Top 50 most influential people in the LGBT community.

In 2008, he directed the controversial bisexual film Shifting Gears. In the press release he used "straight-for-pay" (a play on "gay-for-pay") to describe gay performer Blake Riley's first scene with a woman.

In 2012, LaRue directed the music video for "Trouble" by RuPaul's Drag Race contestant Willam Belli, which premiered on Logo TV.

In 2015, LaRue admitted himself into drug and alcohol treatment in Minnesota, feeling he was "near death", according to friend Kevin Molin.

LaRue opened Chi Chi LaRue's, a gay adult store, in West Hollywood in partnership with Rob Novinger. In 2020 LaRue re-opened Circus of Books, located a few blocks away and originally opened in 1960, after its purchase by Channel 1 Releasing, a company led by Novinger. It was renamed Chi Chi LaRue's Circus. In January 2022 Chi Chi LaRue's Circus was renamed back to Circus of Books, removing LaRue's name due to the partnership between LaRue and Novinger being dissolved. The original Chi Chi LaRue's was closed.

== Awards ==
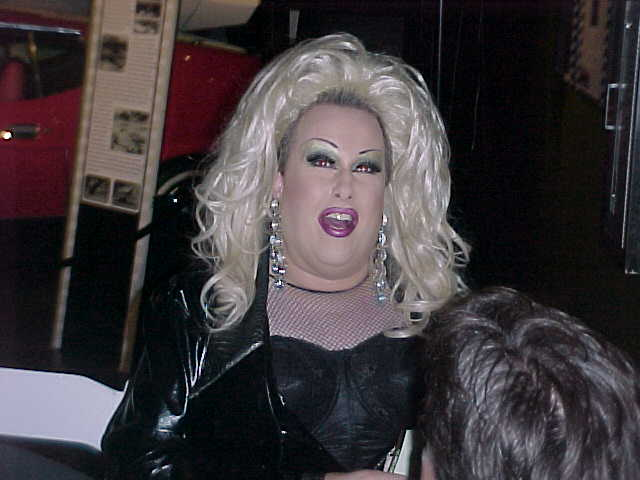
Chi Chi LaRue at the Free Speech Coalition's 13th Annual Night of the Stars Dinner

- 1990 Dave Awards winner of Best Video and Best Director for "More of a Man" (All Worlds Video).
- 1991 AVN award Best Director (Gay Video) – "The Rise" (as Taylor Hudson), Catalina Video.
- 1991 AVN Award Best Non-Sexual Performance–Bi, Gay, or Trans Video – "More of a Man", All Worlds Video.
- 1992 Gay Erotic Video Awards Best Director – "Songs in the Key of Sex", HIS Video (tied with Jerry Douglas, "Kiss-Off", All Worlds Video).
- 1993 AVN Award Best Director (Gay Video) – "Songs in the Key of Sex", HIS Video.
- 1993 Gay Erotic Video Award Best Special Interest Video – "Chi Chi LaRue's Hardbody Video Magazine", Odyssey Men.
- 1993 Gay Erotic Video Award Best Gender Bender – "Valley of the Bi Dolls", Catalina Video.
- 1994 Gay Erotic Video Award Best Non-Sexual Role – "Revenge of the Bi-Dolls", Catalina Video.
- 1995 Gay Erotic Video Award Best Director – "Idol Country", HIS Video.
- 2000 Grabby Award winner of Best Director and Best Video.
- 2001 GayVN Award Best Director – "Echoes", Men of Odyssey.
- 2002 GayVN Award Best Director (Bisexual Video) – "Mile Bi Club", All Worlds Video.
- 2003 GayVN Award Best Director (with John Rutherford) – "Deep South: The Big and the Easy Part 1" and "Part 2", Falcon Studios.
- 2006 Grabby Award Best Director – "Wrong Side of the Tracks Part One" and "Part Two", Rascal Video.
- 2009 GayVN Award Trailblazer
- 2011 Cyber Socket "Best Personality"
- 2012 Cyber Socket "Best Personality"
- 2020 Special Stiletto Award : Evolution Wonderloundge Hall of fame

== See also ==
- List of Grabby recipients
- List of pornographic movie studios
- List of male performers in gay porn films
- Gachimuchi
