= Aiden Shaw =

British pornographic actor and model

Aiden Brady
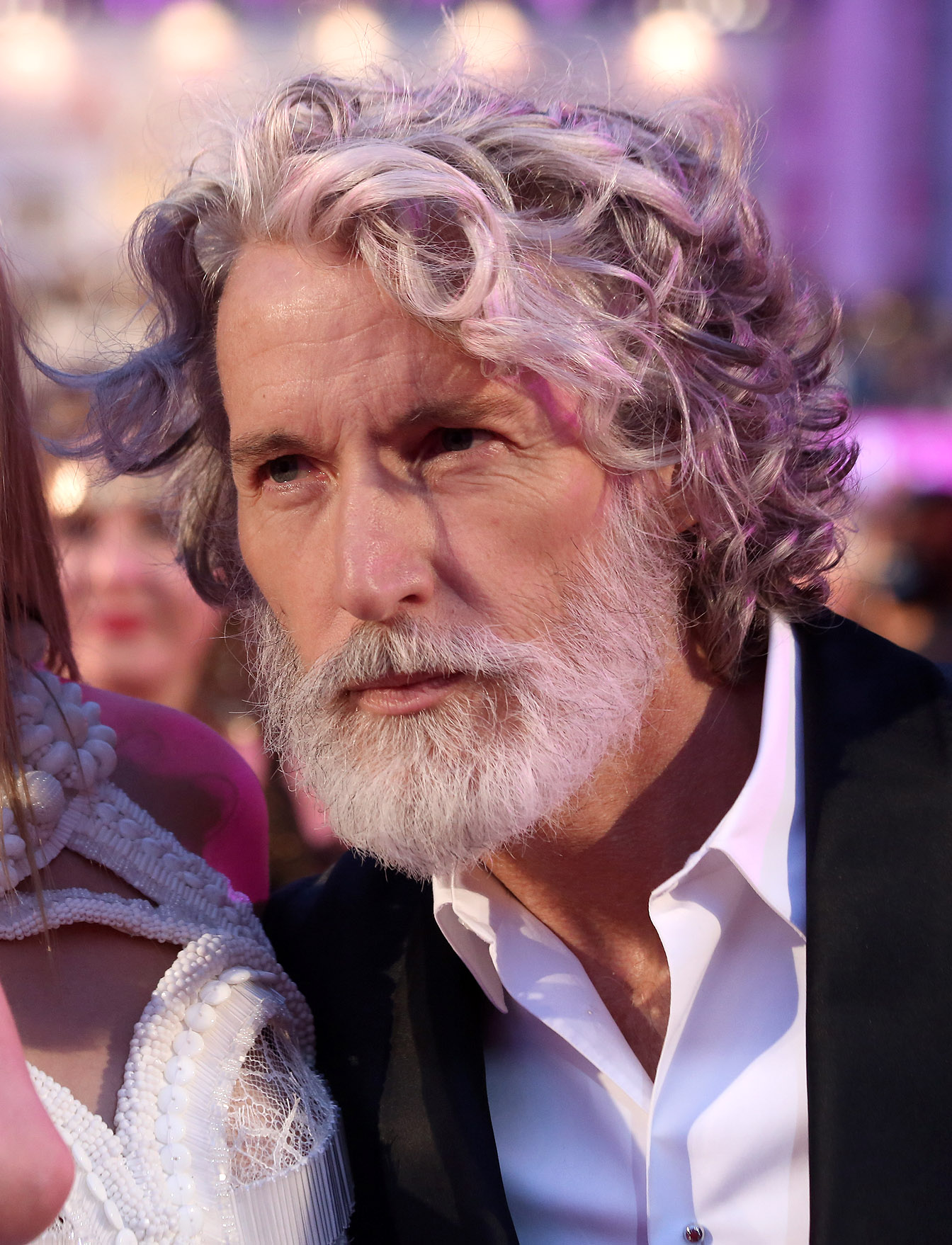
- Aiden Brady in 2013
- Born: Aiden Brady; 22 February 1966 (age 60); Harrow, London, England
- Other name: Aiden Shaw
- Years active: 1990–present
- Modelling information
- Height: 186 cm (6 ft 1 in)
- Hair colour: Grey
- Eye colour: Blue
- Agencies: Sight Management Studio, Barcelona, Spain; Why Not Models, Milan, Italy; KULT MODELS, Hamburg, Germany; Modellink, Gothenburg, Sweden; Q Model Management, New York City, United States; Models1, London, England

Aiden Shaw (born Aiden Brady, 22 February 1966) is an English author, model, and former pornographic film actor.

== Early life and modeling ==
Aiden Brady was born on 22 February 1966 in Harrow, England. He graduated from the University of Brighton.

Shaw was signed to Success Models in Paris and Sight Management Studio in Barcelona. Shaw was photographed by Giampaolo Sgura for Hercules International magazine. In 2013, he was the face of Bytom, a Polish fashion company. In 2014, Shaw walked for Berluti. He was featured by New Zealand menswear brand Working Style for their Autumn Winter 2014 campaign. In 2016, Shaw reverted to his birth name as he continued to model for international brands like Massimo Dutti.

== Pornography ==
Brady adopted the last name "Shaw" in the early 1990s when he began working in gay pornography. He retired from the porn industry in 1999, but in 2004, he starred in another gay porn film with Hot House.

== Writing ==
In 1991, Shaw collaborated with the New York artist Mark Beard to produce a limited edition publication titled Aiden. The book included several portraits of Shaw, with text written by both Beard and Shaw as a form of dialogue.

Shaw published his first novel, Brutal, in 1996. Also in 1996, The Bad Press published a collection of his poems, If Language at the Same Time Shapes and Distorts our Ideas and Emotions, How do we Communicate Love? He wrote two more novels: Boundaries (1997) and Wasted (2001), and an autobiography, My Undoing (2006) in which he discusses his life in the sex industry as a porn star and sex worker, his drug use, and his HIV status (Shaw was diagnosed HIV positive in 1997).

== Published works ==
- Brutal (Millivres Books, 1996) ISBN 1-873741-24-3
- If Language at the Same Time Shapes and Distorts Our Ideas and Emotions, How Do We Communicate Love? (The Bad Press, 1996) ISBN 0-9517233-4-0
- Boundaries (Brighton: Millivres Prowler Group 1997) ISBN 1-873741-48-0
- Wasted (Brighton: Millivres Prowler Group, 2001) ISBN 1-902852-34-6
- My Undoing: Love in the Thick of Sex, Drugs, Pornography, and Prostitution (New York: Carroll & Graf, 2006) ISBN 0-7867-1743-2
- Sordid Truths: Selling My Innocence for a Taste of Stardom (Alyson Books, 2009) ISBN 1-59350-137-4
