= Falcon Entertainment =

Pornography company

- Type: Private
- Industry: Gay pornography
- Founded: 1971
- Founder: Chuck Holmes
- Headquarters: San Francisco, California, United States
- Products: Pornographic films and sex toys
- Owner: Gamma Entertainment
- Website: Falcon Studios

Falcon Entertainment (also known as Falcon Studios), a United States independent company based in San Francisco, California, is one of the world's largest producers of gay pornography.

Founded in 1971 by Chuck Holmes, the company is one of the most recognizable brand names in gay pornography. The owners/managers of several of its major American competitors, Hot House Entertainment, Colt Studios, Channel 1 Releasing and Titan Media (Steven Scarborough, John Rutherford, Chi Chi LaRue, Bruce Cam, respectively) previously worked for Falcon.

== Products ==
Falcon has issued more than 400 pornographic films under several brand names comprising The Falcon Family of Companies:

- Falcon Studios is the group's flagship brand
- Jocks Studios focuses on younger models
- Mustang Studios features more mature models
- Massive Studios focuses on muscular and rugged models
- The Falcon International Collection shoots films in Europe and focuses on European (mostly Eastern European) models
- The Alone With Series includes interviews with performers that masturbate alone rather than having sex with another performer

The company operates a website which serves as a retail outlet for its DVDs and sex toys. Video on demand is also available, as well as the ability to purchase and download videos. Live webcast sex shows are available in a membership area called Falcon TV; membership also includes discounts on other products. Several of the dildos offered for sale are modeled on the penises of Falcon's performers.

== Corporate history ==
Prior to 2004 the Falcon Family of Companies was owned by parent company Conwest Resources Inc.. Conwest was, in turn, owned by the Charles M. Holmes Foundation, a charitable foundation based in Portland, Oregon. The foundation supports a wide range of organizations, including groups protecting lesbian, gay, bisexual, and transgender rights, organizations which provide support to people living with HIV/AIDS, and others that help homeless youth or fight pediatric cancer and autism.

In 2004, the company's management bought Falcon from Conwest through 3Media Corp., a company that was formed by Falcon executives Terry Mahaffey and Todd Montgomery. 3Media will eventually assume the Conwest name. The buyout was arranged in order to separate the business from the Charles M. Holmes Foundation, which continues to function as a nonprofit organization.

Terry Mahaffey died on October 31, 2005. Todd Montgomery left the company on May 22, 2008. Steve Johnson became the president and chief executive officer of Falcon and Conwest.

On December 19, 2010, video-on-demand company AEBN purchased Falcon Studios for an undisclosed amount of money. AEBN merged Falcon Studios and Raging Stallion Studios, although the company said that both brands would remain distinct and AEBN's output would remain constant at sixty DVD titles a year (forty from Raging Stallion). Falcon Chief Executive Officer James Hansen would remain with the company as the chief financial officer of Falcon Studios.

== Notable directors ==
- Chi Chi LaRue
- John Rutherford
- Steven Scarborough

== Notable performers ==
The company, like other studios have performers known as 'Exclusives', meaning though only work for one studio per contract time. In 2005, they released Heaven to Hell (directed by Chi Chi LaRue) which was only cast with Falcon exclusives.

(alphabetical by first name)

- Aiden Shaw
- Al Parker
- Alex Mecum
- Brent Corrigan
- Casey Donovan
- Erik Rhodes
- Gus Mattox
- Joey Stefano
- Jon King
- John Holmes
- Kip Noll
- Kurt Marshall
- Leo Ford
- Manuel Skye
- Michel Lucas (aka Michael Lucas)
- Matt Ramsey (aka Peter North)
- Rafael Alencar
- Ryan Bones
- Tim Kramer
- Marcus Allen
- Tom Chase
- Zak Spears

== See also ==
- CzechBoys
- List of companies headquartered in San Francisco
- List of gay pornographic movie studios
