= List of male actors in gay pornographic films =

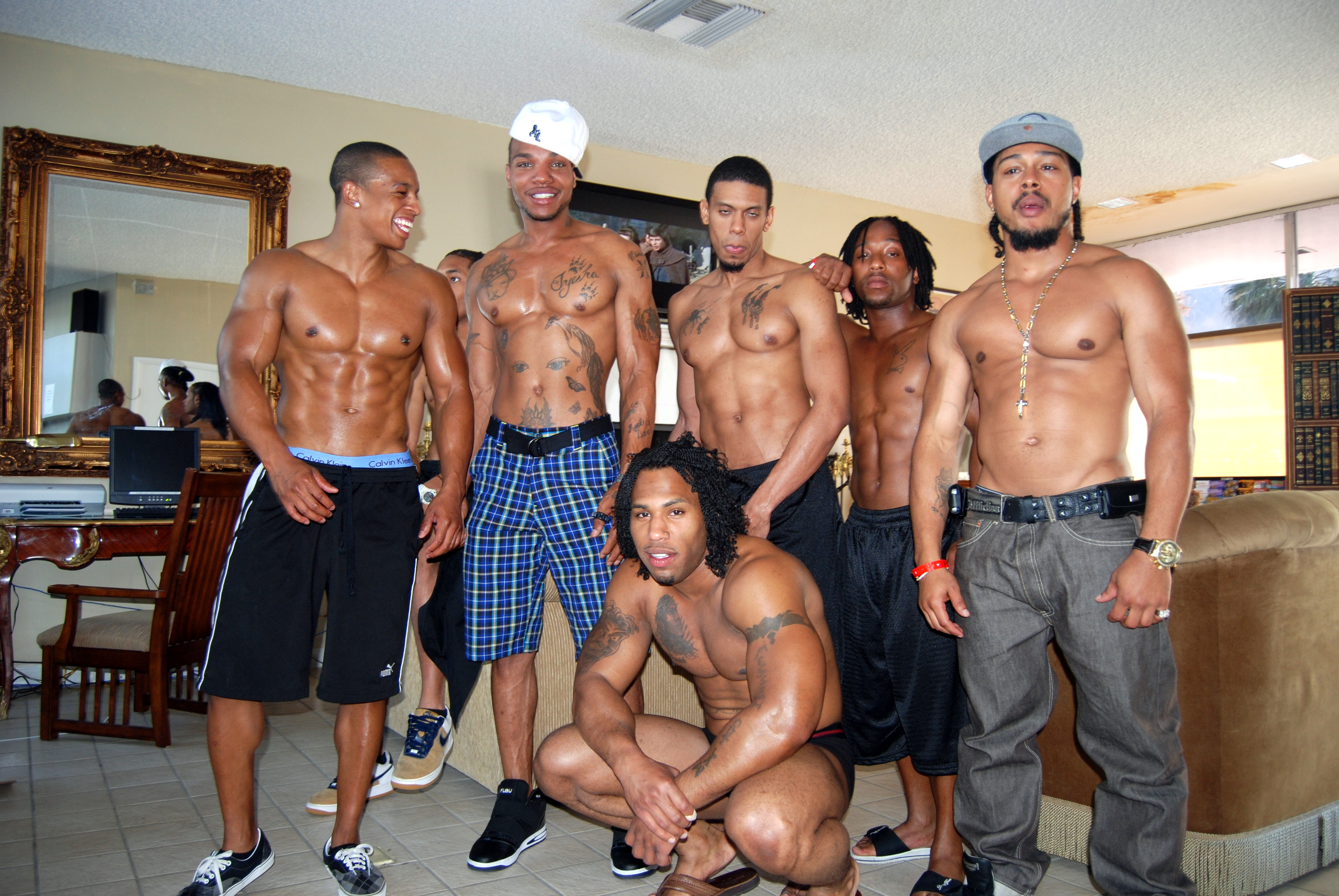
Six gay pornographic actors during the 2010 Blatino Erotica Awards

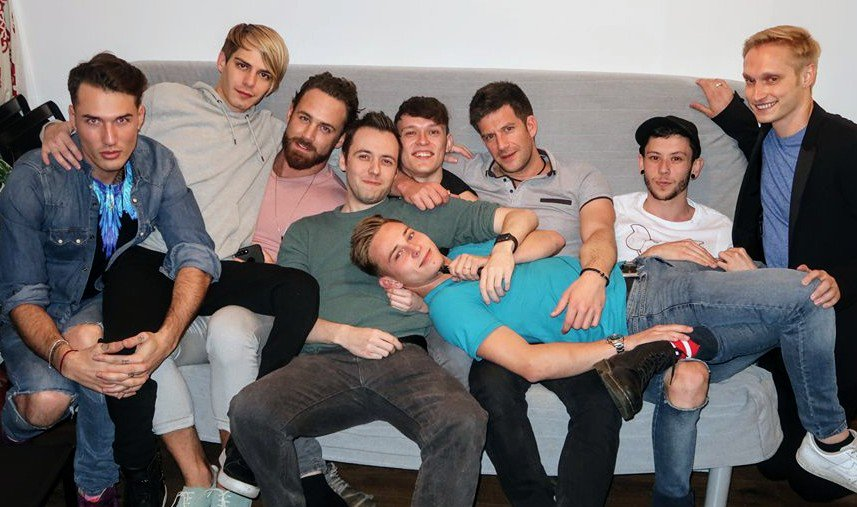
French Twinks Team Meet in London for Prowlers European Gay Porn Awards 2018

This is a list of notable men who have appeared in gay pornographic films. Pornography has become more mainstream and as of 2009 was a $13 billion industry in the United States; globally consumers spent more than US$3000 on porn every second of every day, in 2009. As of 2007, the gay market is estimated to be five to ten percent of the overall adult market.

Gay pornographic films trace their origins to the Athletic Model Guild, founded in Los Angeles in 1945, which produced photographs and still images later turned into films and porn loops. The modern roots of films can be traced to the early 1970s when movies were shown in New York theaters. Over time the "heterosexual adult industry blossomed in Southern California" and often included gay content. Several major shifts affected the gay porn industry: the advent of home video when anyone could purchase a movie to view in private; the AIDS pandemic, which compelled models to be extremely healthy-looking and caused safer sex depictions to become the standard on-screen; and the emergence of the Internet allowing live streaming, social networking and amateur pornography to change how stars are discovered, marketed and even viewed as the films do not have to be copied, packaged and delivered, although those options remain.

The list includes male actors in gay pornographic films who may be notable for their gay pornography and those who may be notable for other reasons or both. The listing is alphabetic by first name. Some performers have many pseudonyms and stage names (indicated here by a.k.a.). Multiple pseudonyms are utilized for a variety of reasons including legal constraints, the appearance of having more actors working at a studio, an actor's wishing to disguise how many films he is working on or that he is doing work for another studio, etc.

The men listed here are known to have appeared in a gay porn film, but not necessarily are gay—see gay-for-pay. Many of these men have also appeared in other forms of pornography, such as pornographic magazines. They may have appeared in other genres of pornography, including bisexual and heterosexual porn.

This list does not include performers who have appeared in other forms of pornography unless they have also appeared in a gay porn film. Many of these performers have been recognized with annual awards in various categories from "Best actor" to "Best top", "Best versatile performer" and even "Best non-sexual performance". There are also international porn awards, as well as discontinued awards, that apply to many of these performers and actors.

With the increasing use of the Internet for live-streaming of movies and video clips, as well as the use of social-networking websites and blogs, amateur porn and niche genres have increasingly competed against the major gay pornography film companies.

== A ==
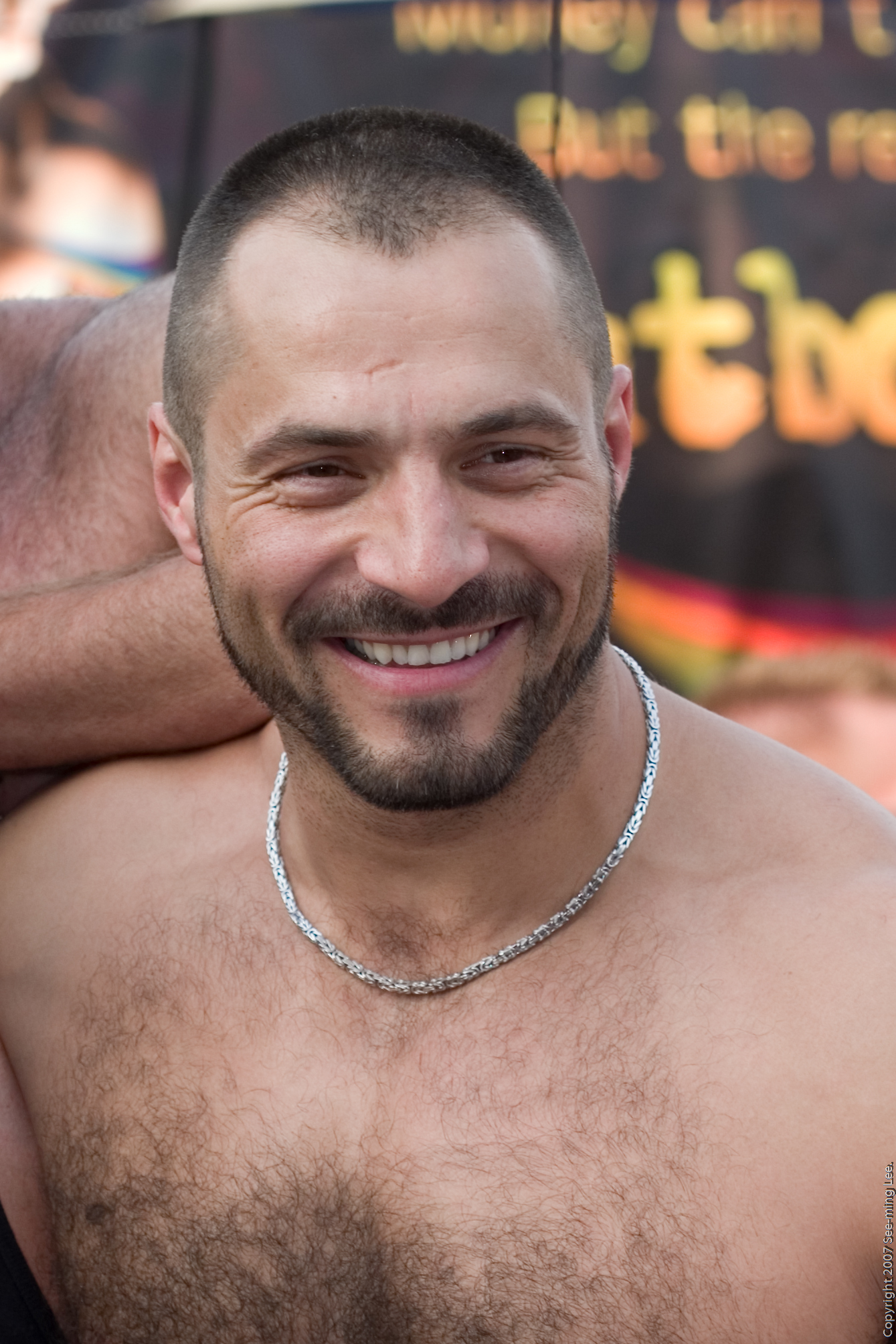
Arpad Miklos

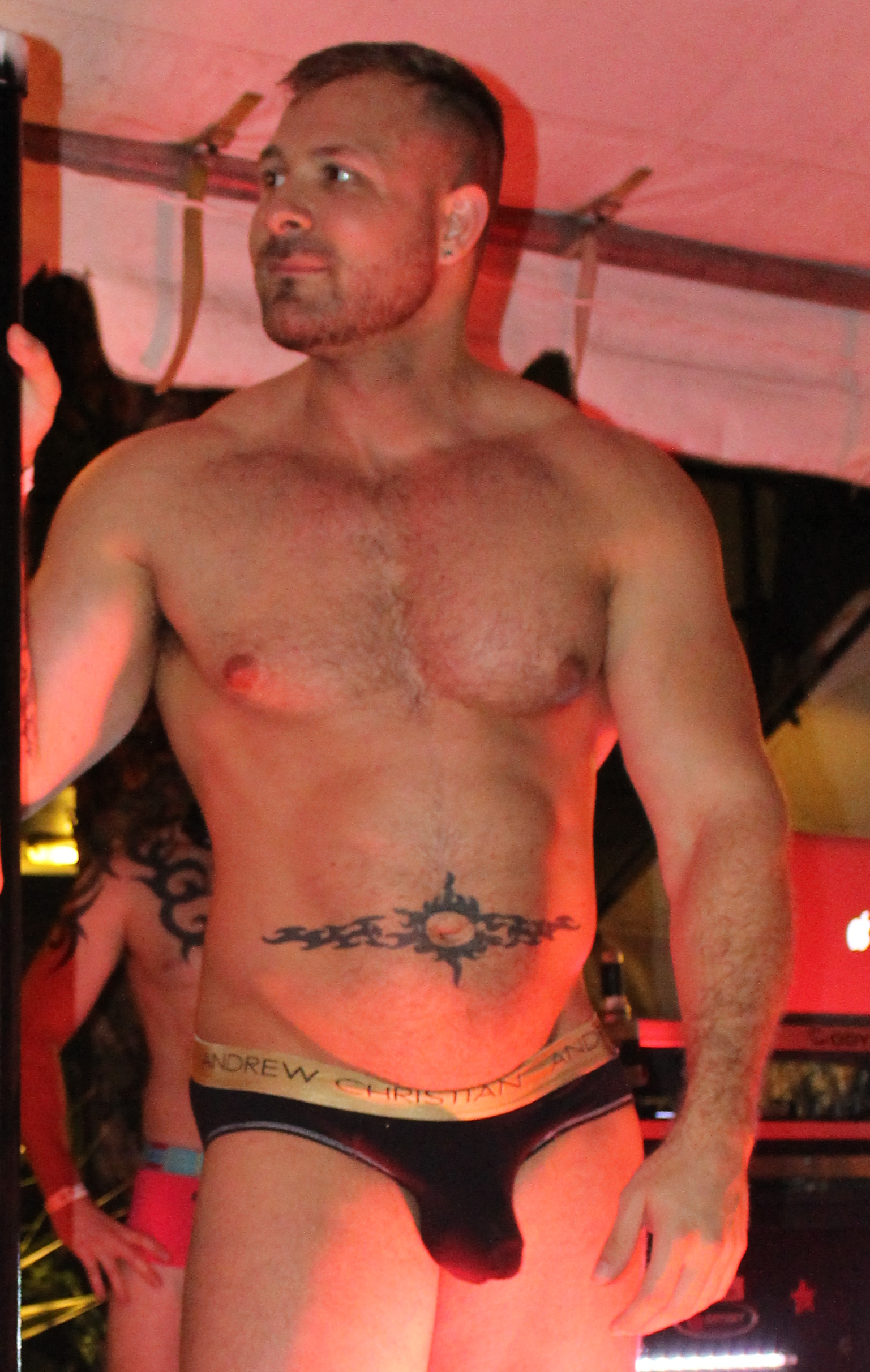
Austin Wolf

- Adam Killian – American versatile porn actor.
- Adam Ramzi – Armenian-American gay pornographic actor, and model.
- Adam Russo - American porn actor and model. He has won several awards for his work, including a 2021 Fleshbot Award in the category for Best Daddy.
- Aiden Shaw – British gay pornographic actor. In 2004, Shaw starred in a gay porn film for Hot House Entertainment.
- Al Parker – American gay pornographic actor. Co-founder of Surge Studios. Parker is widely regarded as a gay pornography icon of the late 1970s through the 1980s. Subject of Clone: the life and legacy of Al Parker, gay superstar.
- Arad Winwin – Iranian-American gay pornographic film actor, model and bodybuilder.
- Armond Rizzo – American-Mexican pornographic actor.
- Arpad Miklos – Hungarian gay pornographic actor. 2005 GayVN Award winner, "Best Solo Performance".
- Austin Wolf – American gay pornographic actor. GayVN Award winner, "Best Top".

== B ==
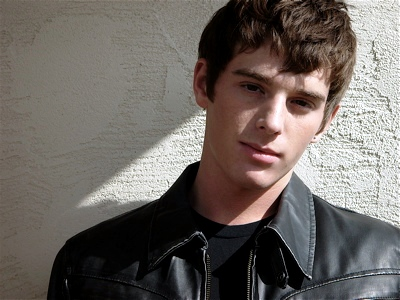
Brent Corrigan

- Bastian Karim – Colombian gay pornographic actor and model. 2025 GayVN Award winner, "Best Actor".
- Bernard Natan – Franco-Romanian gay pornographic actor. He was one of the earliest pornographic actors and directors.
- Billy Herrington – 2000 Probie winner; 2001 Grabby Awards winner, "Best group scene"; Conquered from All Worlds Video. He also gained fame in Japan as an Internet meme.
- Blake Harper – Canadian gay pornographic actor, began working in porn from 1998, GayVN performer of the year 2001, 2001 Grabby Awards winner, "Best group scene"; Conquered from All Worlds Video.
- Boomer Banks – American-Mexican gay pornographic actor, fashion designer and DJ. One of the stars of OutTv reality series X-Rated: NYC.
- Brandon Lee – Asian American gay pornographic film actor of Chinese Filipino descent. He is regarded as the first gay Asian porn star and arguably the most popular Asian pornographic actor in contemporary gay male culture.
- Brenner Bolton – American gay pornographic actor, one of the leads of Men.com film X-Men : A Gay XXX Parody as Cyclops.
- Brent Corrigan – American gay pornographic actor and filmmaker. 2008 Golden Dickie winner, "Best Amateur Twink Performer – Bottom" for Fuck Me Raw while his studio at the time, Cobra Video, won for "Best (Amateur) Twink Studio" largely through his films. 2009 Grabby Awards winner, "Best bottom"; 2009 GayVN Awards winner, "Best bottom"; 2009 named Cybersocket "Top 50 porn star".
- Brent Everett – Canadian gay pornographic actor. In 2009, Metro Weekly described him as "one of the industry's most popular performers".
- Brody Blomqvist – also known under the stage name of Justin Brody, is an American gay pornographic actor and model. He's best known for his work as a Cockyboys exclusive performer, and for appearing on Troye Sivan's music video for his hit-single, "My My My!" in 2018.
- Bruce LaBruce – Canadian filmmaker, photographer and underground adult director. His films explore themes of sexual and interpersonal transgression against cultural norms, frequently blending the artistic and production techniques of independent film with gay pornography.

== C ==
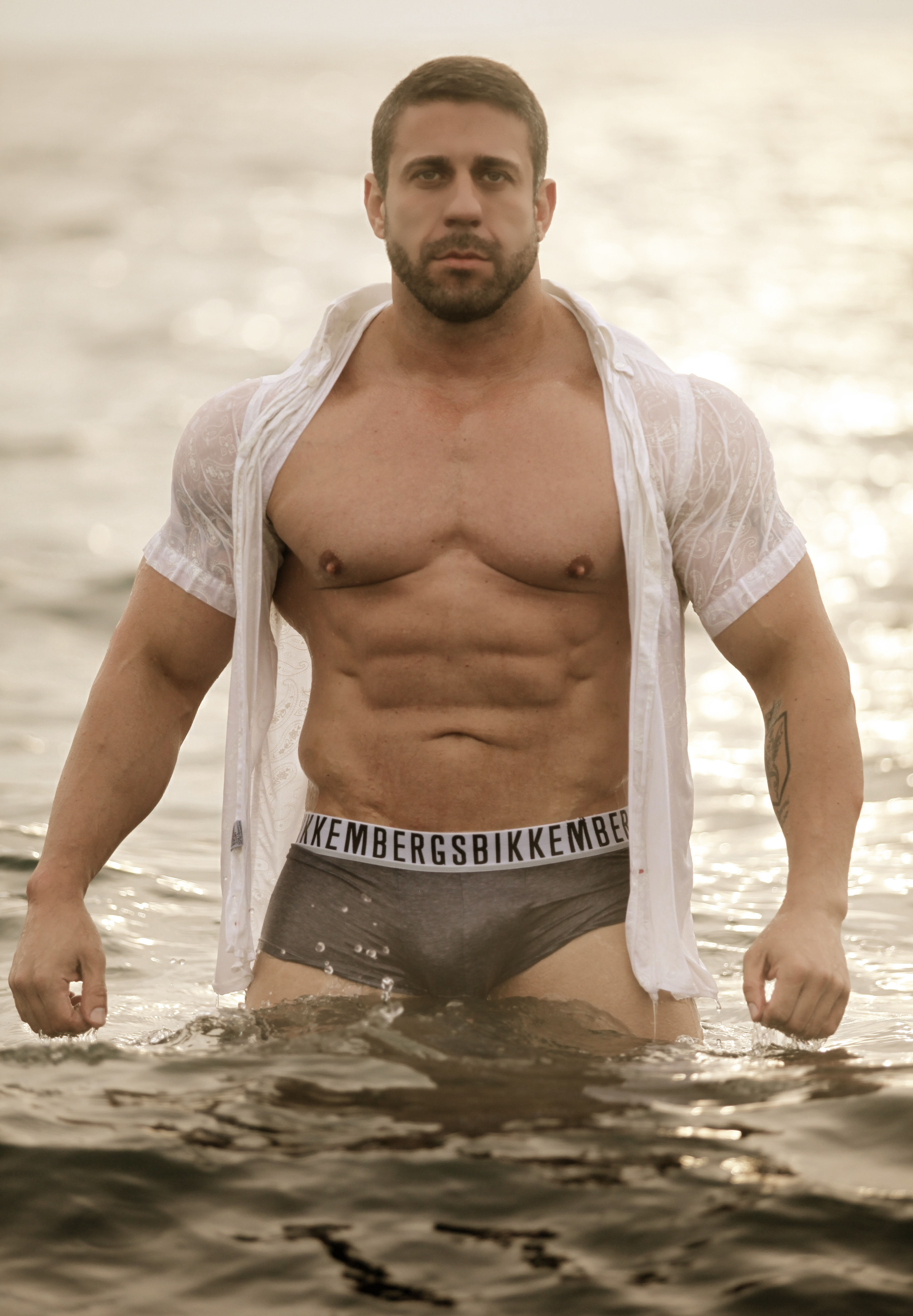
Carlo Masi

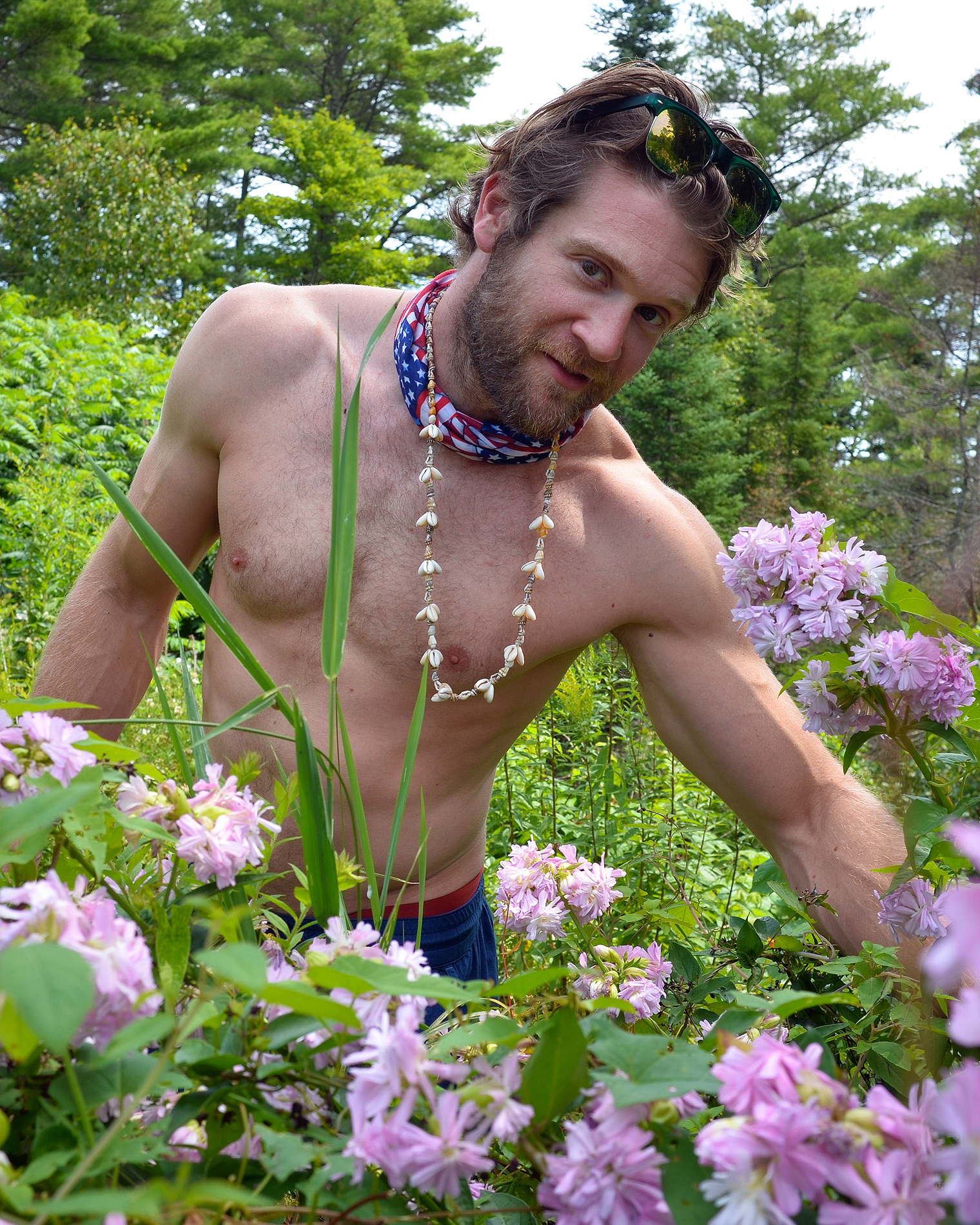
Colby Keller – Maine, 2014

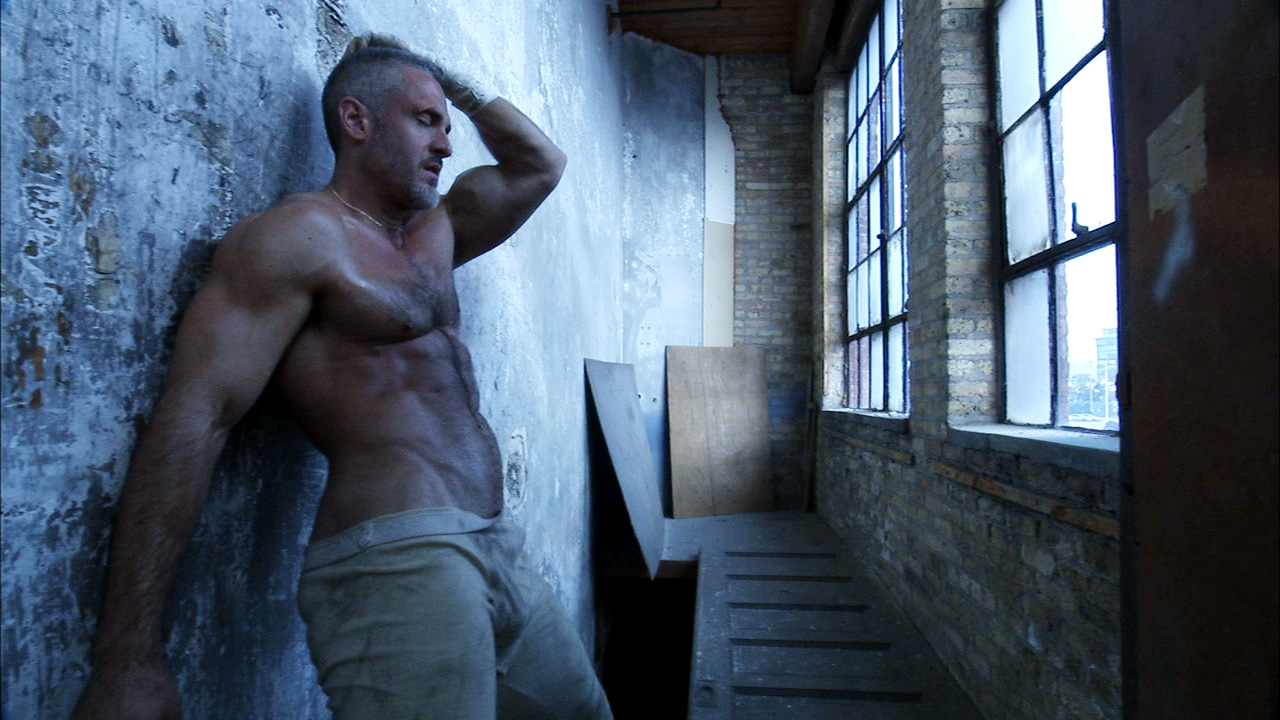
Colton Ford

- Carlo Masi – Italian mathematics lecturer and former gay pornographic film actor.
- Carter Collins – American gay pornographic actor and model. 9x GayVN Award nominee
- Casey Donovan – a.k.a. Calvin (Cal) Culver; see Boys in the Sand.
- Charlie Cherry – Spanish gay pornographic actor, and social media personality. 2024 SayUncle's July AllStar winner.
- Chi Chi LaRue – 1990 AVN Award (pre-GayVN Awards) winner, "Best non-sexual performance"; 1993 Gay Erotic Video Awards winner, "Best gender-bender".
- Chris Crocker – American gay pornographic actor.
- Christian Duffy a.k.a. Chris Duffy, and Bull Stanton – an American professional bodybuilder and actor who was the first well-known bodybuilder to appear in gay pornography starting in the mid-1990s with the Tom of Finland Company.
- Colby Jansen – American pornographic actor.
- Colby Keller – American pornographic actor and visual artist. Keller was awarded with the Cybersocket Web Award for Best Personality in 2016.
- Cole Tucker – 1997 Probie winner; 1998 Probie winner; 1998 Grabby Awards winner, "Best performer" (tie); 1998 GayVN Awards winner, "Gay performer of the year"; 1998 GayVN Awards winner, "Best supporting actor"; 2000 GayVN Awards winner, "Special achievement"; Grabby Award hall of famer.
- Colton Ford – American singer, actor, and former gay adult film star. Ford garnered attention for his distinctly muscular image and was recognized as a multifaceted entertainer who successfully transitioned from adult entertainment into mainstream media. As a gay pornographic actor, he won several accolades including the Grabby Award for Best Group Sex Scene in Conquered (2002) and the GayVN Award for Gay Performer of the Year in 2003.
- Craig Marks – British gay pornographic actor, circus performer, sex worker, model, and social media personality. 2022 Fleshbot Award nominee, 2024 Grabby Europe Award nominee.

== D ==
- Dakota Payne – American gay pornographic actor and musician. Payne was one of the contestants of WOW Presents Plus reality series Vanjie: 24 Hours of Love.
- Dallas Steele – American gay pornographic actor who used to be a news anchor.
- Dani Robles – Spanish gay pornographic actor.
- Dante Colle – American gay pornographic actor, 2021 XBIZ Award winner for 'Performer of the Year', and star of the OUTtv reality series X-Rated: NYC and its spin-off X-Rated: LA.
- Danny Wylde – American pornographic actor and author, who appeared in several gay pornographic films along with straight and bisexual pornographic films. He started his adult film career at age 19.
- Darius Ferdynand a.k.a. Péter Baranyai – Hungarian gay pornographic actor and model. 2015 Prowler Porn "Best British Bottom" Award winner.
- Dave London — British porn actor who has been active since at least 2015. He has performed in many genres but is mostly known for his "daddy" roles and amateur exhibitionist videos, often using his real name David Cregeen.
- Derek Kage – American gay pornographic actor and social media personality. 2024 XBIZ "Gay Performer of the Year" Award winner. 2024 GayVN "Best Leading Actor" and "Best Newcomer" Award winner. 2025 Grabby Europe "Most Accomplished International Porn Star" Award winner.
- Dirk Caber – American gay pornographic actor.
- Drake Von – American gay pornographic actor, winner at GayVN Awards.
- Duncan Black – American gay pornographic actor and model. 2014 Grabby Awards "Hottest Bottom" nominee.

== E ==
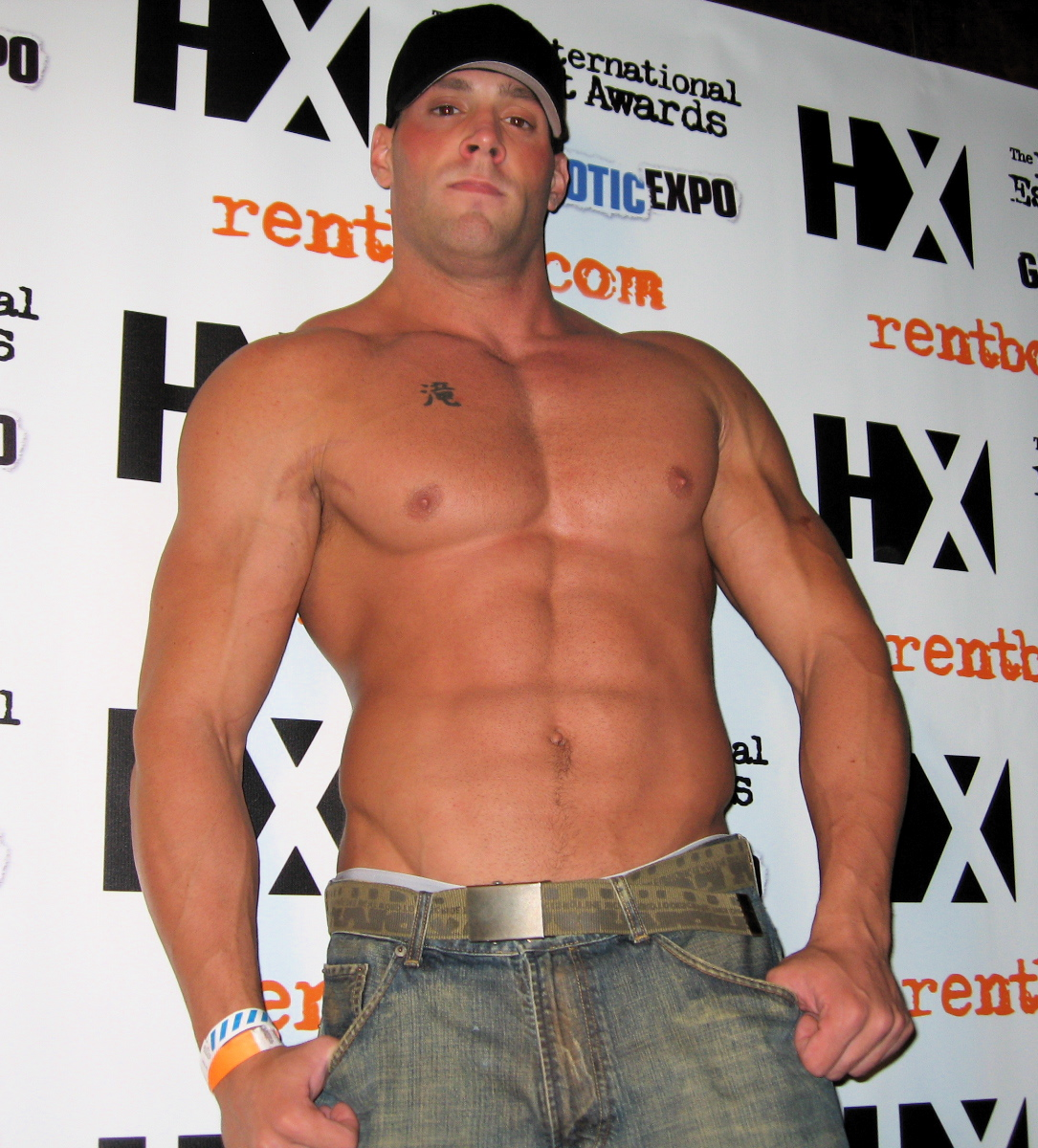
Erik Rhodes

- Erik Rhodes – Falcon Studios exclusive; 2007 Grabby Award winner; 2009 named Cybersocket "Top 50 porn star".
- Eric Stryker – American gay pornographic actor.

== F ==
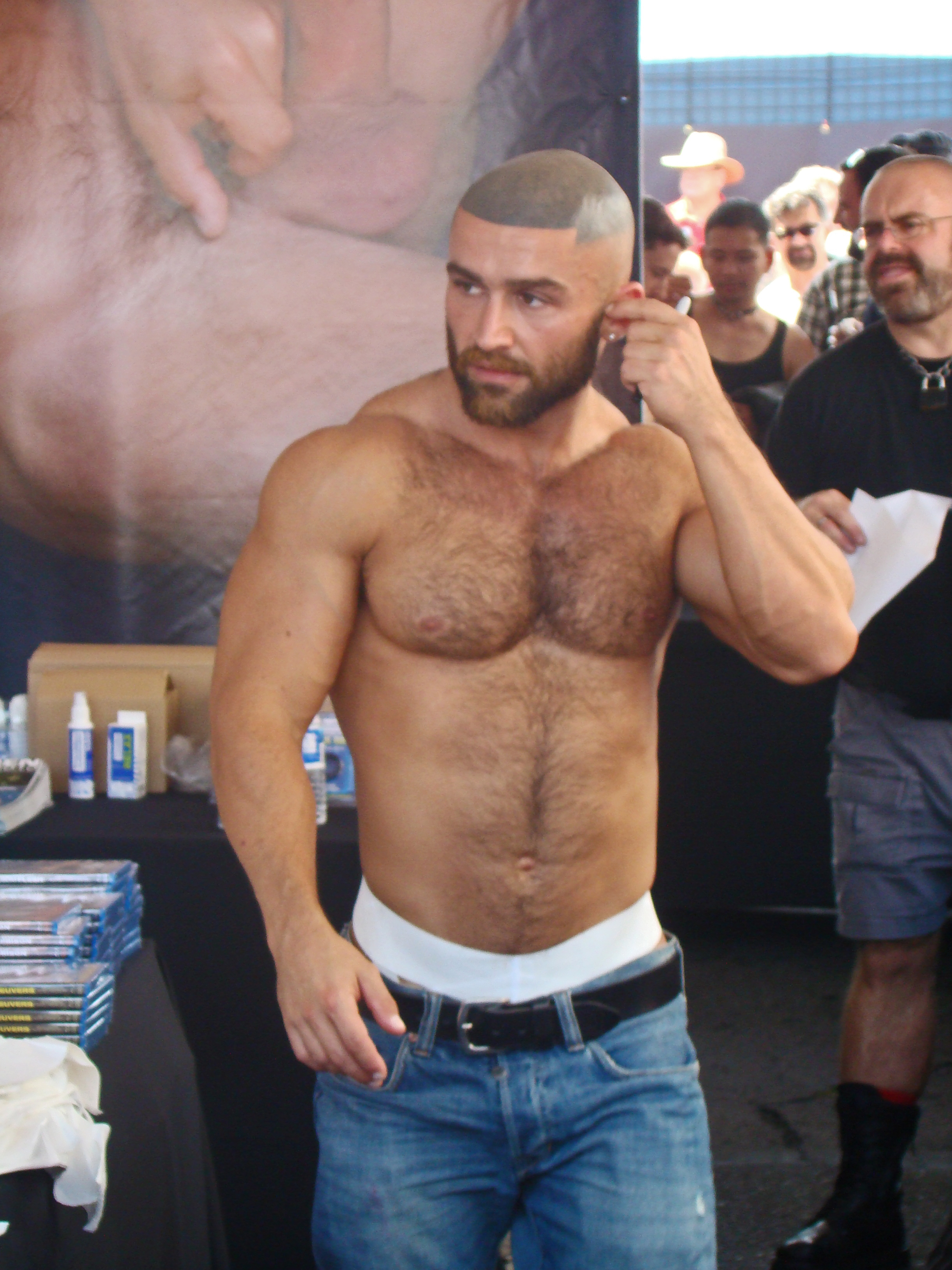
François Sagat

- Flex-Deon Blake – an African-American actor who in 2004 was inducted into the Grabby Awards "Wall of Fame". The Tim Dean book, Unlimited Intimacy: Reflections on the Subculture of Barebacking, treats his controversial film Niggas' Revenge showing the way it fetishizes the simultaneous transgression of a number of taboos.
- François Sagat – 2007 Grabby Awards winner; 2007 GayVN Awards winner, "Performer of the year". A French male pornographic actor with cult status and equally famous in mainstream media, best known for his rugged looks and scalp tattoo. A successful model and actor, he appeared in Saw VI and lead roles in L.A. Zombie and Homme au bain. Famous as a director of his own Incubus adult film series.
- Fred Halsted – American gay pornographic actor.

== G ==
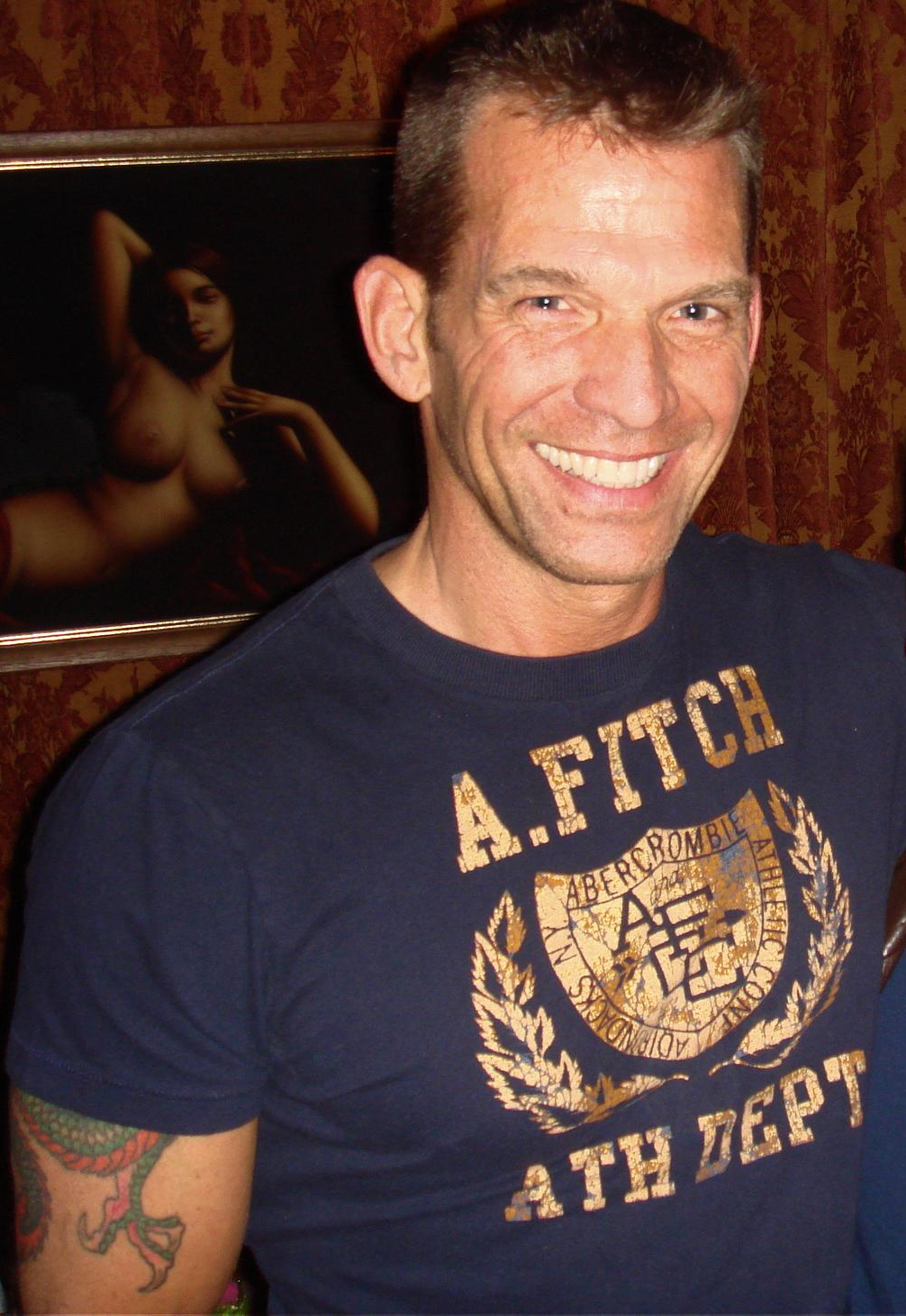
Gus Mattox

- Gabriel Clark – Stage name of Philippe Rivard, Canadian gay pornographic actor and stripper. 2014 XBIZ Award nominee.
- George Payne – XRCO Hall of Fame member.
- Griffin Barrows – American gay pornographic actor.
- Gus Mattox – 2005 Grabby Award winner, "Best actor"; Dangerous Liaisons from Lucas Entertainment; 2006 GayVN Awards winner, "Performer of the year".

== H ==
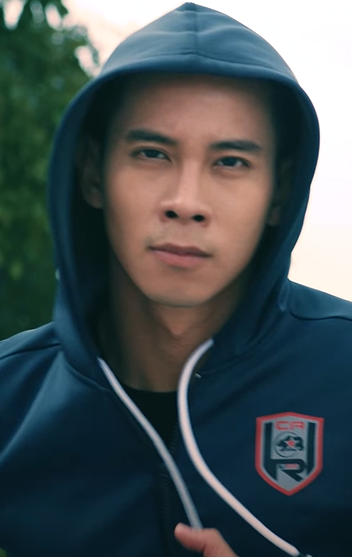
Hồ Vĩnh Khoa

- Héctor de Silva – Stage name of Antonio Moreno Hérnandez, former gay pornographic star, and Men.com exclusive performer, who currently serves as the Mayor of Carcelén, Spain.
- Hồ Vĩnh Khoa – Vietnamese former film actor who opened an OnlyFans account with his husband, also participating along him in gay pornographic films.
- Hoyt Kogan – Stage name of Denek Kania, Czech gay pornographic actor, BelAmi exclusive performer, and fashion model.

== I ==
- Igor Natenko – also known as Joszef Spec, Russian gay pornographic actor, one of the stars of the 1997 gay pornographic film, The Anchor Hotel.

== J ==
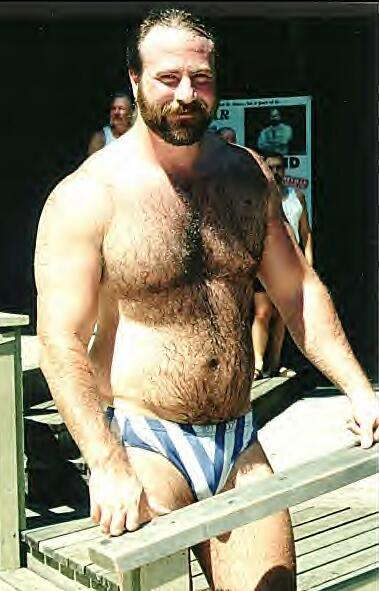
Jack Radcliffe

- J.D. Slater – 2003 GayVN Awards winner, "Hall of fame"; Grabby Awards hall of famer.
- Jack Harrer – Czech pornographic actor and model, known for his work as a BelAmi exclusive performer. 2020 GayVN Award winner.
- Jack Hunter – American gay pornographic actor and model. Men.com exclusive.
- Jack Mackenroth – American HIV activist and Project Runway contestant who began his pornographic career through OnlyFans in early 2018.
- Jack Radcliffe – American gay pornographic actor is considered an icon of gay bear subculture.
- Jack Wrangler – 1992 Gay Erotic Video Awards winner, "Hall of fame".
- Jackie Beat – 1995 Gay Erotic Video Awards winner, "Best Non-Sex performance".
- Jake Andrews – 1996 Grabby Awards winner, "Best supporting actor" (tie); Code of Conduct from Falcon Studios; 1997 Probie winner.
- Jamie Gillis – American pornographic actor, who worked in over 470 pornographic films, mostly straight; has been inducted into AVN Hall of Fame, and XRCO Hall of Fame.
- Jeff Stryker – 1986 Gay XRCO Awards winner, "Best actor"; 1997 AVN Award (pre-GayVN Awards) winner, "Best duo scene"; Grabby Awards hall of famer.
- Jesse Jackman – American gay pornographic actor.
- Jim Steel – 2002 GayVN Awards winner, "Hall of fame".
- Joe Gage – 2005 Grabby Awards winner, "Best non-sex performance"; Beyond Perfect from Buckshot Productions; 2006 GayVN Awards winner, "Best non-sex performance"; Beyond Perfect from Buckshot Productions.
- Joel Birkin – Hungarian pornographic actor and model, known for his work as a BelAmi exclusive performer. 2018 Str8UpGayPorn Award winner.
- Joey Mills – American gay pornographic actor and social media personality. One of the leads of the OutTv reality series X-Rated: NYC.
- Joey Stefano – 1987 Gay XRCO Awards winner, "Best newcomer"; 1990 Adam Gay Video "Dave" Awards winner, 1990 AVN Award (pre-GayVN Awards) winner, "Best performer"; More of a Man from All Worlds Video; 1994 AVN Award winner, "Performer of the year".
- Johnny Hazzard – 2003 Grabby Awards winner, "Best Group Scene"; Detention from Rascal Video/Channel 1 Releasing; 2004 Grabby winner, "Best Duo Scene", "Best Group Scene"; 2004 GayVN winner, "Best Group Scene";2005 Grabby winner, "Best Actor"; 2005 GayVN Awards winner, "Best Group Scene"; 2007 Grabby Award winner; 2006 GayVN winner, "Best Actor", "Best Duo Scene", "Best Solo"; 2008 GayVN Awards winner, "Best Group Scene"; 2009 named Cybersocket "Top 50 Porn Star".
- Johnny Rapid – American gay pornographic actor. 2014 Cybersocket Web Award winner, "Best Pornstar"
- Jon Vincent – 1993 Gay Erotic Video Awards winner; Idol Thoughts from Catalina Video.
- Josh Weston – 2003 GayVN Awards "Performer of the Year" for Deep South, Part 1

== K ==
- Kazuhito Tadano (多田野 数人, Tadano Kazuhito) – a Japanese baseball player for the Hokkaido Nippon Ham Fighters in Japan's Pacific League. He started his career with Major League Baseball's Cleveland Indians in the United States because of a gay porn video scandal, which forced him to leave Japan. Tadano was in porn with college teammates as gay-for-pay performers.
- Ken Sprague aka Dakota – American gay pornographic actor.
- Kevin Falk – American pornographic actor, best known for his work for the studio Randy Blue. Falk worked as a bodyguard for Trinidadian rapper Nicki Minaj, on the red carpet of the 2014 VMAs. In 2018, Falk gained mainstream attention after appearing in the music video of Taylor Swift's hit-single "Delicate".
- Kevin Warhol – Czech pornographic actor, model and director, best known for his work as a BelAmi exclusive performer. 2018 Str8UpGayPorn Award winner.
- Kip Noll aka Kip Knoll – one of the first superstars in the gay porn industry in the 1970s and 1980s.
- Koh Masaki – first gay Japanese pornographic film actor to openly identify as gay both in his films and in his personal life.
- Kurt Lockwood – American gay pornographic actor. He also performed in homosexual and transexual pornographic films. He started his gay pornographic career in 2008.
- Kurt Marshall – born in 1965, he acted in only four films, but the gay pornographic industry trade publication Unzipped named him one of the top 100 gay porn stars of all time in 2006. He was also called one of the "most beautiful" gay adult film stars of the 1980s. At age 18–19, he starred in the highly influential Sizing Up, The Other Side of Aspen II, Splash Shots, and Night Flight. He tested HIV positive in 1986 and died of AIDS complications at age 22.

== L ==
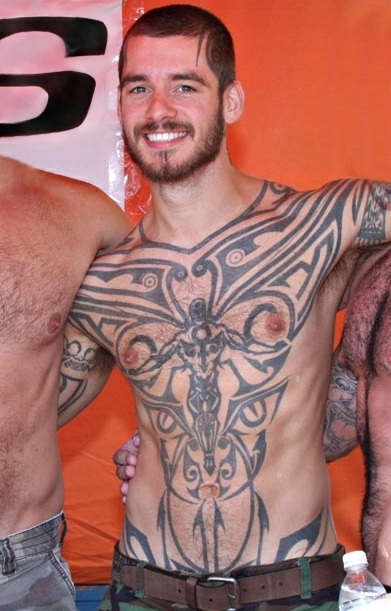
Logan McCree

- Lane V. Rogers a.k.a. Blake Mitchell – American gay pornographic actor, model and social media personality. Helix Studios former exclusive adult performer. 2018 GayVN Award winner, 2018 Grabby Award winner, and 2020 Str8UpGayPorn winner. Rogers died in a motorcycle collision on December 15, 2025.
- Leo Ford – an American who in the 1980s was considered a twink, and travelled worldwide doing jerk-off shows. He dated Divine (actor) and was the butt cover model for one of The Smiths' albums
- Legrand Wolf – American gay pornographic actor, producer, director, entrepreneur and the founder and CEO of Carnal Media.
- Logan McCree – known for his distinctive tattoos over most of his body, including his penis and scalp. In 2004, he was Germany's Mr. Leather. 2009 GayVN Awards winner: Performer of the Year; Best Sex Scene, The Drifter with Vinnie D'Angelo; and Best Threesome, in To the Last Man. 2009 Grabby Awards winner of: Best Actor in The Drifter; Best Duo Sex Scene, The Drifter; and Best Three-Way Sex Scene, To The Last Man. 2010 XBIZ Awards Gay Performer of the Year. 2010 GayVN Awards winner: Best Actor in The Visitor.
- Logan Moore – Dutch professional dancer and gay pornographic actor who debuted in 2014 with Lucas Entertainment.
- Louis Ricaute – American versatile porn actor.
- Lukas Ridgeston (a.k.a. Jan) – Slovak actor, director and model. 1996 Grabby Awards winner, "Hot shot"; 1996 Probie winner; 1996 Gay Erotic Video Awards winner; 2000 GayVN Awards winner, "Hall of fame"; 2006 GayVN Awards winner, "Best Actor – Foreign Release"; Lukas in Love from Bel Ami.

== M ==
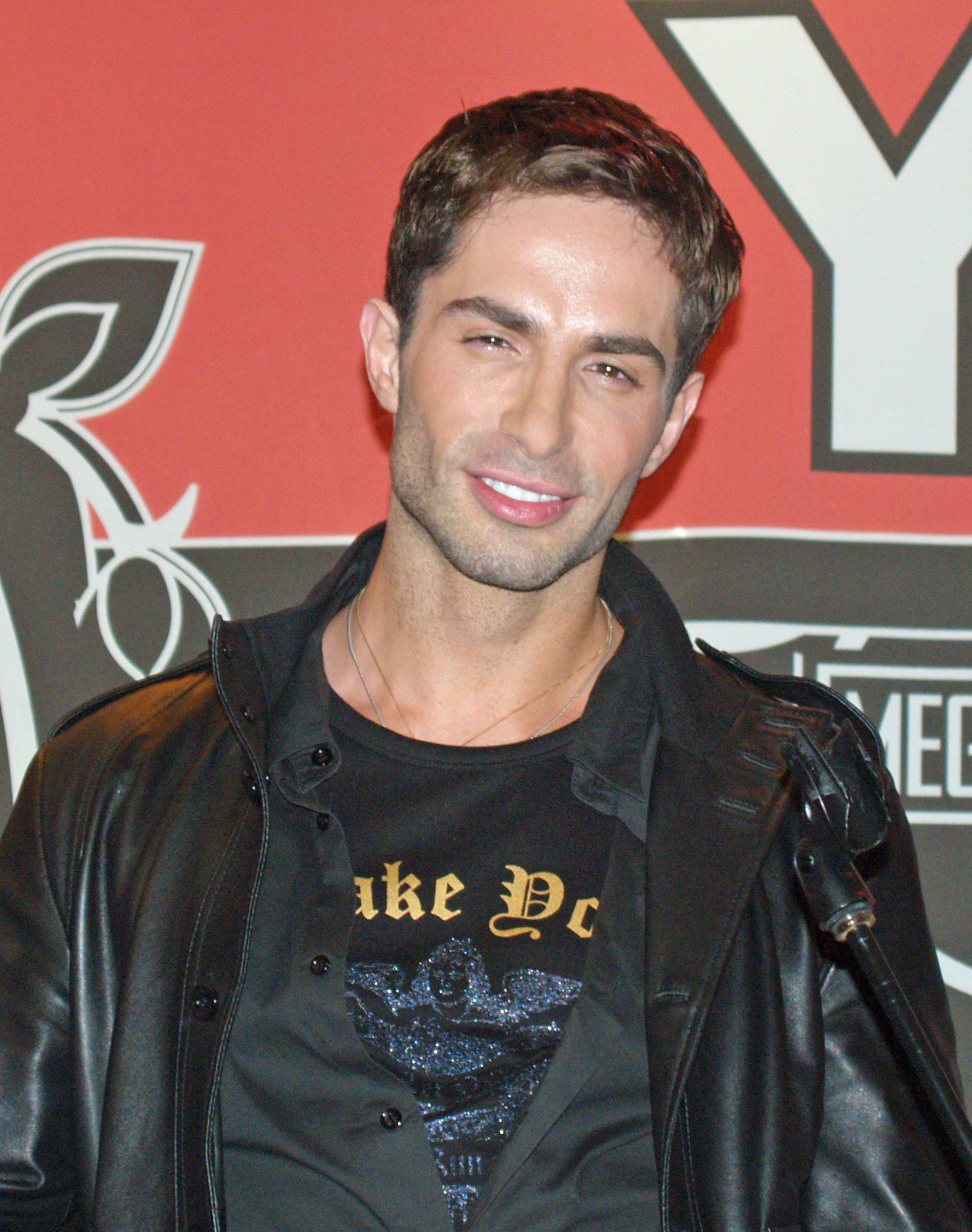
Michael Lucas

- Malik Delgaty – Canadian pornographic actor and model, Men.com exclusive performer. Delgaty was the most-viewed performer of gay porn on Pornhub in 2024.
- Manuel Skye – Canadian pornographic actor.
- Marc Stevens – an American pioneering sex industry figure during the 1970s in New York City. He appeared in over 80 pornographic movies including the "Golden Age of Porn", and also led an erotic dance troupe and performed in live sex shows. While he predominantly appeared in heterosexual films and loops, he was bisexual and made a number of gay movies as well. His penis was famously photographed by Robert Mapplethorpe. Stevens was posthumously inducted into the XRCO Hall of Fame on April 30, 2008.
- Marc Wallice a.k.a. Don Webber, Jay B. David, Marc Gold, Marc Goldberg, Marc Wallace, Mark Wallace, Mark Wallice – an American pornographic actor, model, director, editor, and writer starting in 1982. He started out with non-speaking roles, but worked his way up to being very active doing more than 1,300 heterosexual porn movies. As Don Weber he appeared in at least one gay porn film, A Matter of Size as well as modeling. 1990 AVN Best Group Sex Scene; 1992 XRCO Best Actor (Single Performance); 1993 AVN Best Group Sex Scene; 1993 XRCO Male Performer of the Year; AVN Hall of Fame; and XRCO Hall of Fame.
- Marcus Allen – an American gay pornography model and actor in the mid-2000s convicted of first-degree murder in the shooting death of a Denver philanthropist in 2006. As Allen he was 2003 Freshmen of the year which led to work with Falcon Entertainment.
- Matthew Camp – Men.com exclusive, OnlyFans creator, and social media personality
- Max Konnor – American gay pornographic film actor and webcam model. 2022 GayVN Award winner for Performer of the Year". Main cast member of the OutTv reality series X-Rated: NYC.
- Michael Brandon – 2001 Grabby Awards winner, "Best performer"; 2002 GayVN Awards winner, "Gay performer of the year"; 2003 GayVN Awards winner, "Best gay performer of the year" (tie).
- Michael DelRay – American pornographic actor, and model. GayVN Award winner for "Best Actor" in 2022.
- Michael Lucas a.k.a. Ramzes Kairoff – 2001 GayVN Awards winner, "Best solo scene"; 2007 GayVN Awards winner, "Best actor", "Best threesome", Michael Lucas' La Dolce Vita (2006) from Lucas Entertainment, a gay pornographic remake of the Federico Fellini classic La dolce vita, that won all fourteen GayVN Awards for which it was nominated; 2009 GayVN "Hall of fame"; 2009 Cybersocket "Top 50 porn stars". He is openly gay and has appeared in more than seventy of his own films.
- Mike De Marko – American gay pornographic actor, best known as a Men.com exclusive performer. In 2012, De Marko made a cameo on Taylor Swift's music video for her number-one hit single "We Are Never Ever Getting Back Together".

== N ==
- Nick Capra – American gay pornographic actor who performs mostly as top.
- Nicky Crane – British gay pornographic actor.
- Noah Segsy – German gay pornographic actor.

== P ==
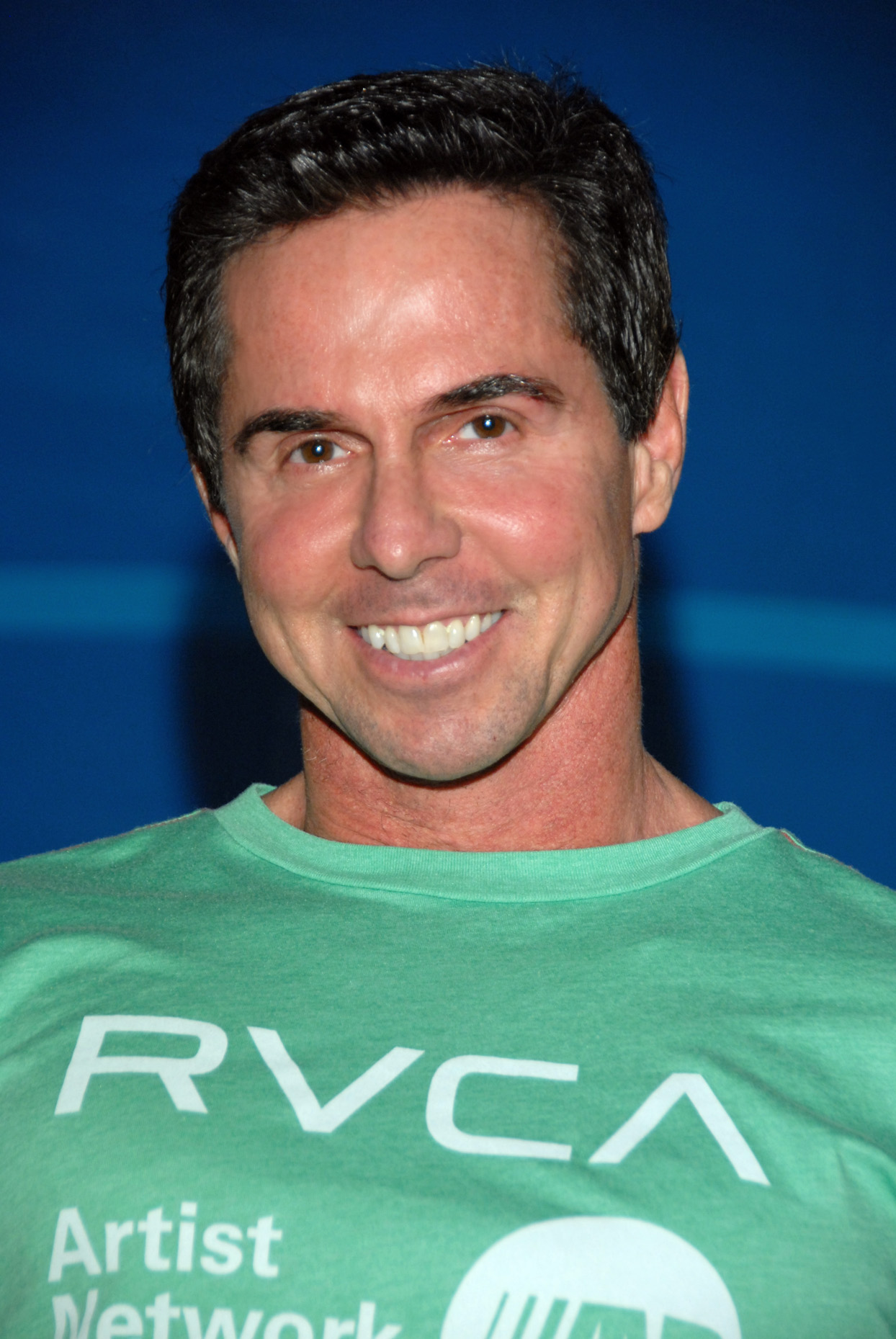
Peter North

- Paddy O'Brian – British gay pornographic actor and erotic model. O'Brian appeared in the viral music video for Sam Smith and Kim Petras hit-single "Unholy".
- Paul Barresi – 2007 GayVN Awards winner, "Best non-sex performance"; 2008 GayVN Awards winner, "Hall of fame"; Grabby Award hall of famer.
- Peter Berlin – 2007 GayVN Awards winner, "Hall of fame".
- Peter North a.k.a. Matt Ramsey – better known for heterosexual porn, directing and producing.

== Q ==
- Quentin Gainz – American pornographic actor. 8x GayVN Award nominee, including nominations for "Best Actor" and "Performer of the Year", both in 2018.

== R ==
- Reno Gold – American gay pornographic actor and model. OnlyFans creator, and social media influencer.
- Rich Merritt – American gay pornographic actor who appeared in gay pornographic films under name "Danny Orlis".
- Rick Cassidy – American gay pornographic actor used name "Jim Cassidy" for pornography.
- Rhyheim Shabazz – American gay pornographic star who received the 2024 GayVN award for Performer of the Year. The following year, he received the same award, becoming the second artist to ever achieve that feat. He also took the award for Best Duo Sex Scene at the 2025 ceremony. He is the first adult content creator to reach one million followers on social platform X.
- Robert Mimra - Czech pornographic actor born in 1994 who began working in pornography in 2015 and used the names "Ray Mannix" and "Lucas Watkins".
- Robert Van Damme – Czech pornographic actor and model for Hot House Studios
- Rocco Steele – American gay pornographic actor, director, and former escort. He has won two GayVN Awards, one XBIZ Award, six Grabby Awards, one Cybersocket Web Award, and one Prowler Award.
- Rod Barry – American pornographic actor, and director. 1997 Gay Erotic Video Awards nominee for Best Newcomer. 1998 Gay Erotic Video Awards nominee for Best Top. 1998 Grabby Awards winner of Best Supporting Actor in "A Lesson Learned" (All Worlds Video). 2002 Grabby Awards nominee for Best Supporting Actor, Best Duo Sex Scene and Best Trio Sex Scene. 2002 GayVN Awards winner of Best Supporting Actor in "White Trash". 2004 GayVN Awards winner of Best Group Scene with Johnny Hazzard, Theo Blake, Alex LeMonde, Kyle Lewis, Dillon Press, Troy Punk, Shane Rollins, Rob Romoni, Anthony Shaw, Sebastian Tauza in "Bolt" (Rascal Video). 2005 GayVN Awards nominee for Best Actor in "Thirst". 2006 Grabby Awards winner of Hottest Versatile Performer. 2008 GayVN Awards inducted into the Hall of Fame.
- Rogan Richards – Australian bisexual porn actor, model and bodybuilder. He started his career in 2013 after sending pictures to Men at Play.
- Roman Todd – American pornographic actor and model. 2023 GayVN "Performer of the Year" Award winner.
- Ryan Driller – started his pornographic career by gay porn films under the name "Jeremy Bilding". He was a 2010 XBIZ Awards nominee for "Gay Performer of the Year".
- Ryan Idol – 1993 Gay Erotic Video Awards winner, "Best oral scene"; ''Idol Thoughts from Catalina Video; 1995 Probie winner best porn star; 1994 AVN Award (pre-GayVN Awards) winner, "Best performer".
- Ryan Orion – American gay pornographic actor and model. His portrayal of Saxon Ratliff in The Tight Lotus: A Gay XXX Parody gained mainstream attention after American actor Patrick Schwarzenegger, who played Ratliff in The White Lotus, mentioned it in an interview with W Magazine.

== S ==
- Sam Jensen Page a.k.a. Sam Tyson, Samuel Francis – fitness journalist, trainer and fitness center owner in Los Angeles; founded and published HERO Magazine; former adult porn model and actor.
- Scott Masters – 2000 GayVN Awards winner, "Lifetime achievement".
- Scott "Spunk" O'Hara – a gay American pornographic performer, poet, editor/publisher of the quarterly men's journal Steam, and author. He wrote Rarely pure and never simple: selected essays of Scott O'Hara, Autopornography: a memoir of life in the lust lane, SeXplorers: the guide to doing it on the road, and Do-it-yourself piston polishing (for non-mechanics). Died of AIDS complications, leaving his personal papers (consisting of 39 boxes of journals, correspondences, notes, and manuscripts) with the John Hay Library of Brown University.
- Sean Zevran – American porn actor and go-go dancer. He has won three GayVN awards including Performer of the Year in 2018, Best Fetish Sex Scene together with JJ Knight in 2019 and Best Duo Sex Scene with Rhyheim Shabazz in 2021.
- Seth Peterson – Stage name of Adam Aguirre, American gay pornographic actor, 2021 GayVN Award Winner for Hottest Newcomer. Peterson passed away in 2026 at the age of 28 from unknown causes.
- Seth Santoro – American gay pornographic actor
- Simon Rex a.k.a. Sebastian – American actor, television personality and rapper best known as one of the first MTV VJ's;1997 AVN Award, Best Gay Solo Video, for Hot Sessions #3.
- Steve Brockman a.k.a. Ryan Stack – English rugby player, coach, and former gay pornographic actor. He was in a long-time relationship with English actor Rusell Tovey, until their split in 2023.
- Stonie – nominated for "Best Newcomer" at the 2001 GayVN Awards. Stonie later became a trans woman, Brittany CoxXx, and appeared in Brittany's Transformation, which was nominated for a 2009 AVN Award for "Best Transsexual Release".

== T ==
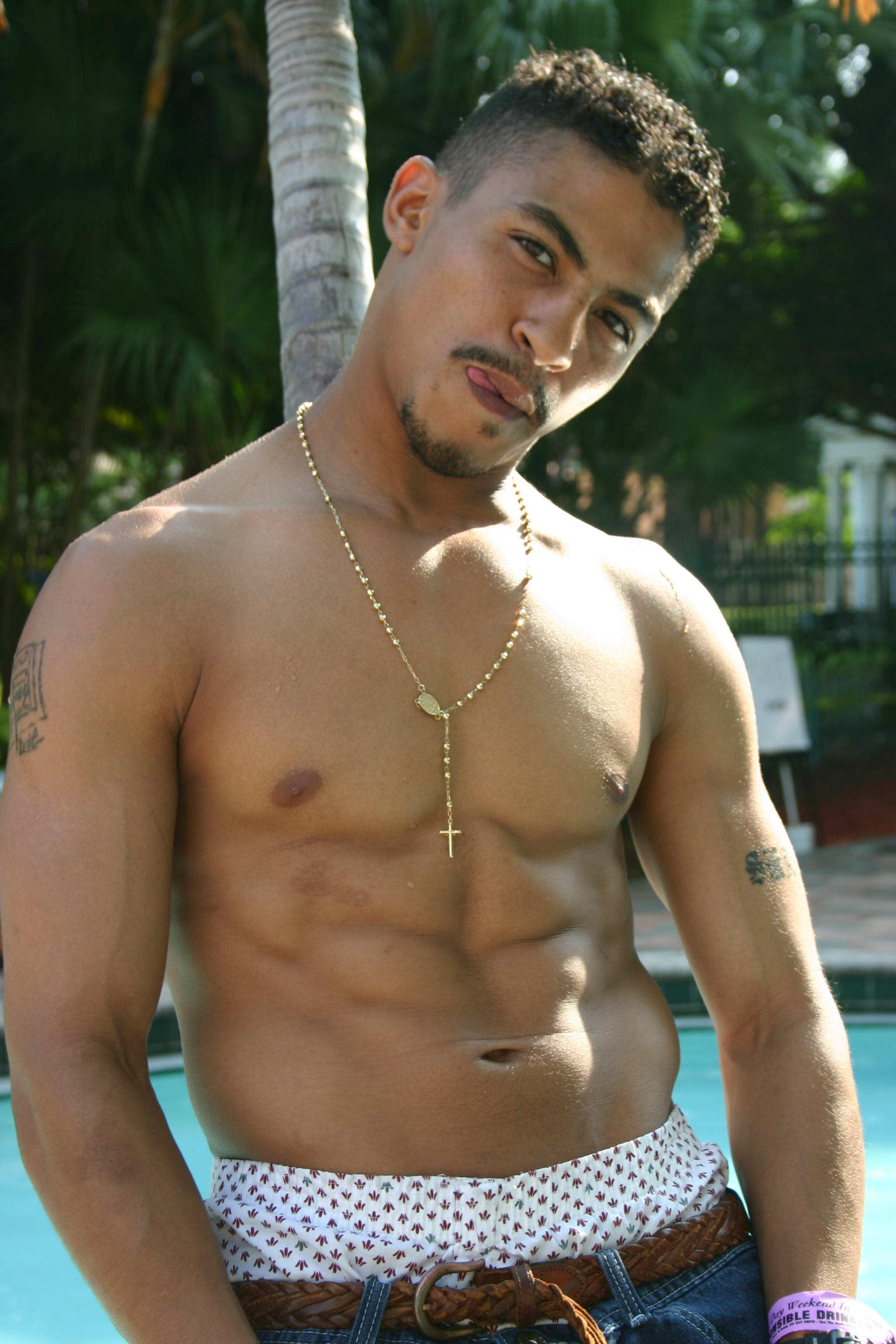
Tiger Tyson

- Tag Eriksson – 2003 Grabby Awards winner, "Best newcomer" and "Best solo"; 2004 GayVN Awards winner, "Best solo".
- Thierry Schaffauser – French gay pornographic actor. He won the Erotic Award in 2010.
- Teddy Torres – Canadian gay pornographic actor.
- Tim Kruger – stage name for Marcel Bonn, was a German gay pornographic actor and director. He founded his own production company TimTales, which made him one of the world's best-known performers and producers of gay porn. Kruger died after suffering a domestic accident in his apartment on February 28, 2025.
- Tiger Tyson – 2008 GayVN Awards winner, "Hall of fame"; founder of Tiger Tyson Productions and co-founder of Pitbull Productions. Starred in over two dozen pornographic films, and directed several others.
- Tim Barnett a.k.a. Bradford Thomas Wagner – American real estate agent and pornographic actor who died by suicide while in police custody as a suspected serial rapist; he appeared in at least twenty gay porn films as Barnett in the early 1990s.
- Tom Chase – 1997 Gay Erotic Video Awards winner, "Best top"; 1997 Probie winner, "Best actor"; 1998 Gay Erotic Video Awards winner, 1998 GayVN Awards winner, "Best duo scene"; 1999 Probie winner; 2000 Probie winner; 2004 GayVN Awards winner, "Hall of fame".
- Topher DiMaggio – American pornographic actor. 2014 Grabby "Best Top" Award winner, ".
- Ty Mitchell – an American writer and former gay pornographic actor. He starred alongside American actress Emma Stone, in a sketch for Saturday Night Live.

== V ==
- Viktor Rom – Venezuelan gay pornographic actor. 2021 Grabby Award winner.

== W ==
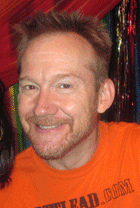
Will Clark

- Wade Nichols – American gay pornographic actor.
- Will Braun – American gay pornographic actor, Men.com and Next Door Studios exclusive performer. 2018 GayVN Award nominee for "Favorite Twink".
- Will Clark – 1998 Grabby Award winner, "Best performer" (tie); 1998 Gay Erotic Video Awards winner, "Leo Ford humanitarian award"; Grabby Award hall of famer.
- Will Wikle – American gay pornographic actor. In 2008, Wikle was cast as the villain, Jasper, in the gay proof sequel Another Gay Sequel: Gays Gone Wild!, released December 9, 2008. In 2016, he starred in the gay adult film The Stillest Hour for CockyBoys.
- Woody Fox – Australian gay pornographic actor, model, and circus performer. He participated as a contestant on Canada's Got Talent and was awarded with the show's Golden Buzzer.

== Y ==
- Yusaf Mack – American gay pornographic actor.

== Z ==
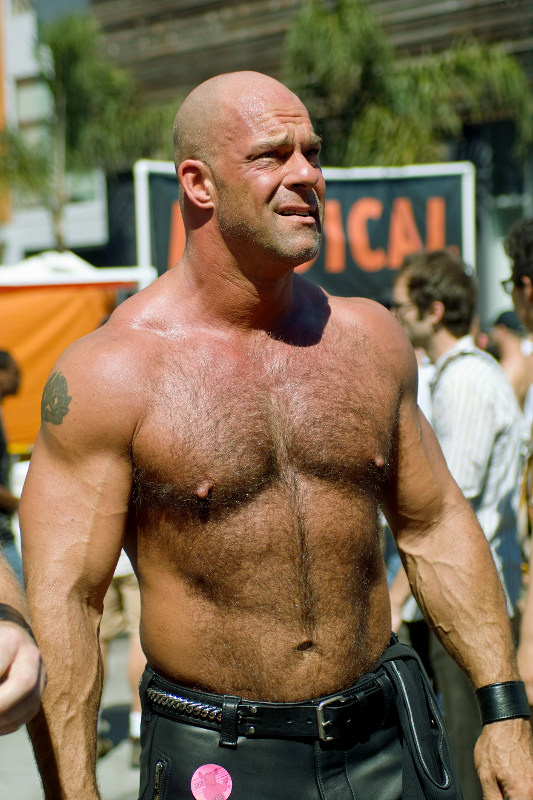
Zak Spears

- Zak Spears – 1993 AVN Award (pre-GayVN Awards) winner, 1993 Grabby Awards winner, "Best newcomer", "Best supporting performer"; 1993 Gay Erotic Video Awards winner; 1994 "Best actor" (tie); 1994 Adam Gay Video "Dave" Awards winner, "Best sex scene"; 1997 Probie winner; 2002 GayVN Awards winner, "Best actor" (tie);2004 Grabby winner, "Best duo scene", "Best non-sex performance"; 2005 GayVN winner, "Best non-sex performance"; Grabby Award hall of famer.
- Zebedy Colt – American gay pornographic actor.

== See also ==
- Adult Erotic Gay Video Awards (Grabbys)
- Discontinued gay pornography awards
- Gay Erotic Video Awards
- Grabby recipients
- List of gay porn movie studios
- List of gay porn magazines
