= Brittany CoxXx =

American actress

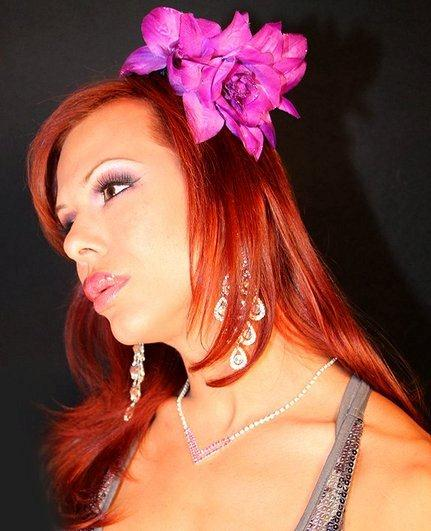
- Born: Adrian Cortez; July 19, 1978; New Orleans, Louisiana, U.S.
- Died: December 6, 2016 (aged 38); Fort Lauderdale, Florida, U.S.
- Other name: Stonie
- Education: Licensed dental hygienist
- Occupation: Pornographic performer
- Years active: 1999–2009
- Agent: David Forest
- Height: 5 ft 8 in (1.73 m)

Adrian Cortez (July 19, 1978 – December 6, 2016), better known by the stage name Brittany CoxXx, was an American performer in gay and transsexual pornography. CoxXx had a successful career in gay pornography under the name Stonie before transitioning from male to female in late 2005. Before transition, she performed in more than 60 productions, appeared on nearly 50 box covers, and was nominated for the 2001 GayVN Award in the "Best Newcomer" category. She made a cameo appearance in the 2006 movie Borat.

== Early life ==
Cortez was born on July 19, 1978, to Perry Cortez Sr. and Deborah (née Waguespack) in New Orleans, Louisiana, and had three brothers. Under the stage name Stonie, Cortez began working in both gay and transsexual pornography in 1999.

== Gay porn career ==
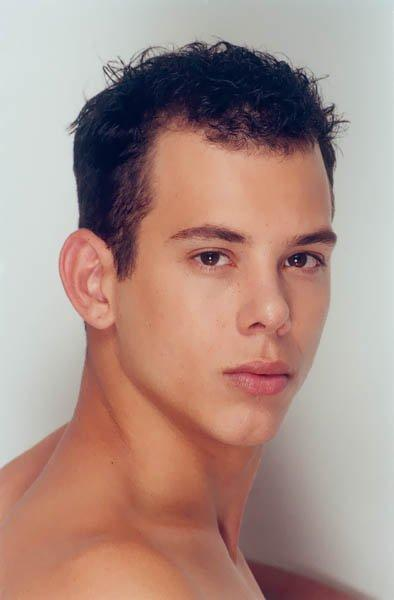
CoxXx when performing under the name Stonie in gay pornography

After several performances with Gary McKay's L.A. Heat productions, Cortez (under the name Stonie) signed an exclusive contract with GayVN Hall of Fame director Paul Barresi. The contract was unusual because it included benefits rarely provided in the adult industry. By 2006, Cortez's career included more than 60 productions and involved every major gay porn studio. Accolades included being described as the Kate Moss of gay porn and "the boy with the hottest ass". Mickey Skee described Cortez as having "one of the hottest asses in the business since Joey Stefano's" and Jason Sechrest described Cortez as an "insatiable super bottom with an unparalleled sex drive".

Cortez's work often included "dictatorial daddies" and authoritarian, discipline, or military themes. In playing roles subservient to "dictatorial daddies", Cortez was well-matched with Barresi, as Adult Video News has said Barresi's directorial efforts made Cortez "undisputedly the king of military-themed videos." Many of the authoritarian videos were made with Barresi and his Regiment Productions studio (such as Brig Brats, Carnal Cadets, and Wild Blue), though a spanking fetish video was filmed with Control-T Studios and a bondage video Roped Trick with Tom "Ropes" McGurk.

Cortez appeared in a scene with J.T. Sloan, the 1995 GayVN Gay Performer of the Year, in the 2000 Pacific Sun Entertainment production Daddy Please! Working with All Worlds Video, Cortez made White Lies, Father Figure, appearing with GayVN Award and two-time Grabby Award-winner Sam Crockett. Cortez was featured in the film's sequel Father Figure 2. For Catalina Video, Cortez appeared in a threeway with Jason Sizemore. The two also appeared together in the Studio 2000 production Straight Up. Cortez's career included appearances on nearly 50 box covers.

Cortez received a nomination in the Best Newcomer category in the 2001 GayVN Awards. Credits that year included an appearance in the Men of Odyssey production Caesar's Hardhat Gang Bang, which won the 2001 GayVN Award for Best Ethnic-Themed Video.

== Borat cameo ==
Borat is a 2006 mockumentary comedy film that was a critical and commercial success, but which was also highly controversial. In what was described as one of the best sight gags in the film, the central character Borat Sagdiyev shows photographs of himself with his allegedly 13-year-old son Hooeylewis, portrayed by Cortez, to an etiquette coach. In one such photo, Hooeylewis is naked and "cradling his Dad in his arms" while in another "Borat [is] squatting down giving the thumbs-up sign to a close-up of shot of his son's large endowment".

RadarOnline republished the Radar magazine report on the porn star appearing as Borat's son:

Borat's producers first contacted [Stonie's manager, David Forest] in June 2005, he tells Radar. "They wanted to find someone who would look 13 or 14 but was actually of legal age and would do frontal nudity", he recalls. Cortez immediately sprang to mind, he says, because "he's a small-framed boy but has a large organ".

Commenting on the appearance, Queerty noted that, despite Borat exploiting "his son's genitals", Sacha Baron Cohen did not invite Cortez to the premiere of Borat. Forest did comment that the star "earned far more for [the Borat] photo session than [she] would've if it had been for an adult company. We got paid a good sum of money."

== Transition ==
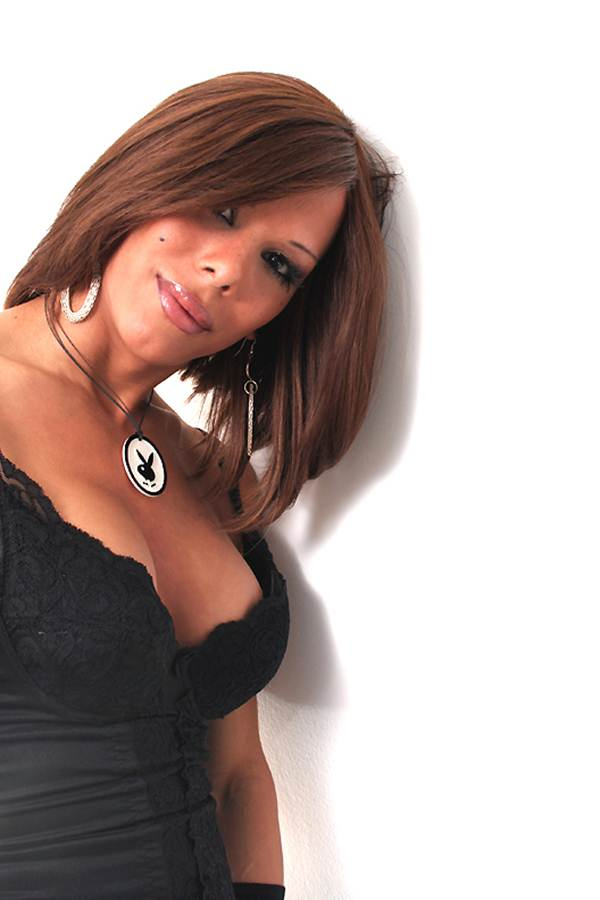
Brittany CoxXx, after her transition

Cortez's last gay porn appearances were filmed in 2005, though these works continued to be released until 2006. Her transition began in late 2005 and lasted approximately one year, after which she took the stage name Brittany CoxXx. At the start of 2008, agent David Forest confirmed her return to adult film productions, her first performance being in Brittany's Transformation in collaboration with Barresi, who she trusted and respected after their earlier work together. CoxXx declared that she was "really looking forward to working again with Pleasure Productions and Paul Barresi," adding that it's "funny how things happen in life. Everything seems to come full circle."

The film Brittany's Transformation told the story of her transitioning and was well received. Barresi put together the financing for the film and chose to include older footage of Stonie to tell her transition story. Barresi described the film as a transsexual movie unlike any other. The film was nominated in the 2009 AVN Awards in the category of Best Transsexual Release, and CoxXx was nominated in the category of Transsexual Performer of the Year. Speaking about Brittany's Transformation, CoxXx commented that "since this is my first movie as a woman – in my new bod, which I totally love by the way – it's a whole new experience onscreen for myself and for the viewers". She was partnered with Christian XXX in the final scene of the film.

J. C. Adams commented that CoxXx's transsexual performance "may actually be the first time a gay adult performer has undergone the switch and re-emerged as a MTF actor. (Others have donned drag, of course, but that's a different animal.)" Jason Sechrest claimed that CoxXx was the first to move from gay male to trans woman porn star, describing the movie as "groundbreaking", but adult trans-actress Stasha did it in the early 1990s, gaining attention after previously having performed in gay porn under the names Angelo and Steven Moore before transitioning to Stasha. Lucas Entertainment performer Christina Cruz has followed Brittany by transitioning from the gay male market to the transsexual market. According to Gay Porn Times editor J.C. Adams, the report of CoxXx's transition was in the top 10 most popular stories the magazine covered in 2008. Chi Chi LaRue commented on the difficulties CoxXx faced, observing that "she was happier once she transitioned" but many "people didn't show her support or respect her decision."

== Post-acting and death ==
CoxXx left the adult industry in 2009 and moved to Florida, where she spent several months in hospital battling Hepatitis B and liver disease. By January 2010, her hepatitis was reported to be almost undetectable and she was recovering well. By September, CoxXx was reported as fully recovered and made a live appearance at Micky's in West Hollywood, California, stealing the show. CoxXx started a business in Fort Lauderdale – Couture Visions Photography – which she owned and operated until her death.

CoxXx died at Broward Health in Fort Lauderdale on December 6, 2016, at the age of 38 due to complications arising from Hepatitis B and liver failure. She was survived by her father, two of her brothers, and her paternal grandmother. CoxXx was remembered fondly by adult industry figures. Chi Chi Larue described CoxXx as a "true original" who was "very beautiful in both of his and her lives" and "grabbed the bull by the horns and did it his way. She will definitely be missed. Rest in peace sweet angel." The JRL Charts President reflected on McKay's introducing him to Stonie, who he described as an "upbeat young man who had high hopes for a career in the gay adult film industry [who] became a true friend for many years...I will truly miss her."

== Videography ==
Gay pornographic video appearances as Stonie include:

- The Big Tease – Stonie Learns a Lesson (1999, director: Steve Powers, studio: Control-T Studios)
- Roped Trick (1999, director: Tom "Ropes" McGurk, studio: Grapik Art Productions)
- Caesar's Hardhat Gang Bang (2000, director: Chi Chi LaRue, studio: Men of Odyssey), won the 2001 GayVN Award for "Best Ethnic-Themed Video"
- Daddy Please! (2000, director: Paul Barresi, studio: Pacific Sun Entertainment)
- Father Figure (2000, directors: Peter and Casey O'Brian, studio: All Worlds Video)
- White Lies (2000, director: Rafael, studio: All Worlds Video)
- Brig Brats (2001, director: Paul Barresi, studio: Regiment Productions)
- Carnal Cadets (2001, director: Paul Barresi, studio: Regiment Productions)
- Father Figure 2 (2002, directors: Peter and Casey O'Brian, studio: All Worlds Video)
- Stonie Slept Here! (2002, director: Edward James, studio: Rosebud Male)
- Monster Meat (2003, director: Peter Romero, studio: Catalina Video)
- Straight Up (2003, director: Derek Kent, studio: Studio 2000)
- Jeff Stryker's Tall Tails (2004, director: Ross Cannon, studio: Stryker Productions)
- Wild Blue (2005, director: Paul Barresi, studio: Regiment Productions)

Transsexual pornographic video appearances as Brittany CoxXx include:

- Brittany's Transformation (2008, director: Paul Barresi, studio: Evolution Erotica), nominated for the 2009 AVN Award for "Best Transsexual Release"

== See also ==
- List of male performers in gay porn films
