= Scott Masters =

American pornographic film director

- Born: Bill Sheffler
- Died: 2020; Bloomington, Illinois
- Other names: Robert Walters, Ken Albert, Robert Stephens
- Occupation: Gay pornographic film director

Scott Masters (1934?–2020) was an American gay pornographic film director and studio owner active in adult film since the mid-1960s.

Masters used the pseudonym "Robert Walters" when he directed his early films, which include Greek Lightning. when he founded Nova Studios. He later shuttered Nova Studio and became head of production at Catalina Video. In 1992, he co-founded gay adult film studio Studio 2000. In 2006, Masters sold Studio 2000 to former Falcon Entertainment consultant David McKay.

== Early years ==
Masters grew up in Illinois, and later attended college.

Masters came to San Francisco, California, from Chicago in 1966. Many of the bookstores (including gay and adult bookstores) which he visited were openly selling gay pornography. He established a small business purchasing gay pornographic magazines for area booksellers. He began selling nude male photosets from such notable photographers of the male nude as Bruce Bellas ("Bruce of L.A."), as well as softcore nude films from Athletic Model Guild.

In late 1967, he formed a partnership with Reuben Sturman to print and distribute one-off magazines featuring the work of Kundzicz. The first magazine was Champions All, published in the spring of 1968. Moving full-time to San Francisco from Chicago, Masters took up work as a full-time bookkeeper at a printing company. He began taking photographs of nude men on the side to supply his magazines with images. Although the U.S. Supreme Court had ruled that images of the male nude were not obscene in MANual Enterprises v. Day 370 U.S. 478 in 1962, U.S. postal inspectors still considered the tumescent and erect penis obscene under then-current interpretations of American federal postal and obscenity law and court rulings. Nevertheless, Masters took hardcore as well as softcore images, and images of solo, duo and group sex.

In 1969, Masters began producing hardcore gay male nude magazines. The Supreme Court had further liberalized the standards for obscenity in Redrup v. New York, 386 U.S. 767 (1967), and several lower-court rulings had significantly undercut the ability of state and federal authorities to seize even materials which depicted hardcore sexual activity between individuals of the same gender. The first such magazine was Hard?. By the end of the year, Masters was producing as many as six magazines a month.

In 1970, Masters produced his first film, Drilled Deep. It was a "loop" (an 8mm Short film, roughly 200 feet in length, designed to run over and over in peep shows). To distribute his hardcore films, Masters established his first adult film studio, named The Stephens Agency. Masters closed the distribution business in 1972 because it was unprofitable.

That same year, Masters was prosecuted in Texas for obscenity. He pleaded guilty. He received a one-year suspended sentence, three years of probation, and a fine. After his sentencing, Masters cut back on the number of brochures, magazines and loops he produced but did not exit the adult film industry. By 1976, however, Masters had directed more than 100 loops.

== Feature film career ==
In 1973, Master directed his first feature-length hardcore gay adult film which starred zarni warry. The film was Greek Lightning, produced for Jaguar Productions and starring gay porn star Jimmy Hughes. Using guerrilla filmmaking techniques, Masters produced one of the best-selling gay adult films of the 1970s:

We did some rather audacious things. We shot on top of a train in Train Town in Griffith Park without a permit, while one of us was given one of the guards money and another of us was talking to another guard, just so we could get the shots finished. We knew we couldn't be there long. All we had to do was do our legerdemain for five or ten minutes and be out of there. And we certainly couldn't pay for it.

Masters heartily disliked that sort of filmmaking process. Jaguar Productions later heavily edited the film, angering Masters so much that he vowed not to make another film.

In late 1973, Masters founded In Touch (now known as In Touch for Men), a softcore gay porn magazine. But after two years, Masters turned over management of the magazine to a third party (while retaining ownership).

== Nova Studios ==
In 1976, Masters (still using the name Robert Walters) founded Nova Studios, distributing films through direct mail as well as adult bookstores. The studio's first production was Tubtricks. Masters doubled the length of Nova Studios' loops to more than 400 feet, extending each film's running time to nearly 20 minutes. Masters followed up with a series of long loops: Kept After School, Beached, Tricking, Hot Lunch, Jocks, That Boy Next Door and Down on the Farm.

Masters attempted to keep Nova Studios afloat by finally producing sound films. In 1981, Masters bowed to public demand for sound film and financial pressures and produced It's the Life. Filming went so poorly that Masters eventually shot most of the film without sound. Masters would not finally produce a sound film until 1983. But in the intervening two years, Nova Studios lost critical market share. Masters began dubbing older silent loops in 1981 as well. He added music, some narration, and asynchronous sexual sounds to the films and began re-releasing these to make money.

In 1984, Masters hired Chet Thomas as an editor, and Thomas worked on several of Nova Studios' final films.

Nova Studios ceased to make gay adult films in late 1986.

== Catalina years ==
In 1987, Masters was hired as head of production for Catalina Video. William Higgins had founded Catalina in 1978. Catalina Video had been distributing Nova Studios' films to adult bookstores and video stores since about 1982. With Nova Studios in financial distress, Higgins and Masters struck a deal: Catalina would purchase the rights to the unreleased Boys Town. Masters would be free to sell the rights to all his other films to another vendor. Catalina would also hire Masters as its head of production, where he would also be free to write and direct films on an occasional basis.

Masters sold the rights to nearly all of Nova Studios' films to L.A. Video. Unfortunately, L.A. Video would go bankrupt a few years later, leaving the rights to all of Nova Studios' products in legal limbo.

Given the transition in his life, the director stopped using the name "Robert Walters" and adopted his new stage name, Scott Masters.

Masters' first film for Catalina was The Bigger They Come (1987). For the first time, Masters made a film on a set in a studio rather than on location. He followed it up with Down for the Count, a film which featured the debut of popular star Jon Vincent.

Once at Catalina, Masters also hired Chet Thomas, his former editor at Nova Studios.

During his time at Catalina, Masters also became good friends with director John Travis. Travis had been working for Brentwood Studios and Falcon Studios since the early 1970s. In 1988, Masters hired him away from Falcon. The first film Travis helmed under Masters' supervision was My Best Buddy (1988).

Masters is also partly responsible for the career of gay adult film director Chi Chi LaRue. LaRue had come to California in 1987 and gotten a job in Catalina's sales department. He had been promoted to the promotions department, and sought a directing job. Masters, however, refused to give him one. LaRue left Catalina in 1989, moving to InHand Productions and Vivid Video. Catalina president Mike Merrick left and new studio head Christian Mann took over. Mann rehired LaRue, and put him to work on his first film, Billboard (starring Joey Stefano). LaRue credits Masters with forcing him to learn more about directing, which led to his eventual directorial career.

The change in management at Catalina led Masters to significantly cut back on his duties. While he still managed productions, he became far less involved in casting decisions. When Merrick eventually purchased Catalina from Higgins, Masters decided to leave the studio.

== Studio 2000 ==
In 1992, Masters left Catalina. John Travis, too, had left Catalina after a contract dispute and began using the name "John Trennel." The two directors co-founded Studio 2000 in late 1992.

Masters announced his retirement in 1999. But he quickly returned to making adult film. He and John Travis found and hired Czech photographer Jan Novak to produce Studio 2000 International line with European talents.

During the 14 years in which Masters co-owned Studio 2000, the studio won numerous awards at the Grabbys, Gay Erotic Video Awards, and GayVN Awards.

In April 2006, Masters and Travis sold Studio 2000 to former Falcon Entertainment consultant David McKay. Masters continued with the studio as a consultant until October 2006.

== Death ==
In mid-autumn 2020, Masters died in an assisted-living facility in Bloomington, Illinois at the age of 86.

== See also ==
- List of male performers in gay porn films
