= Tiger Tyson =

American gay male pornographic actor, and producer

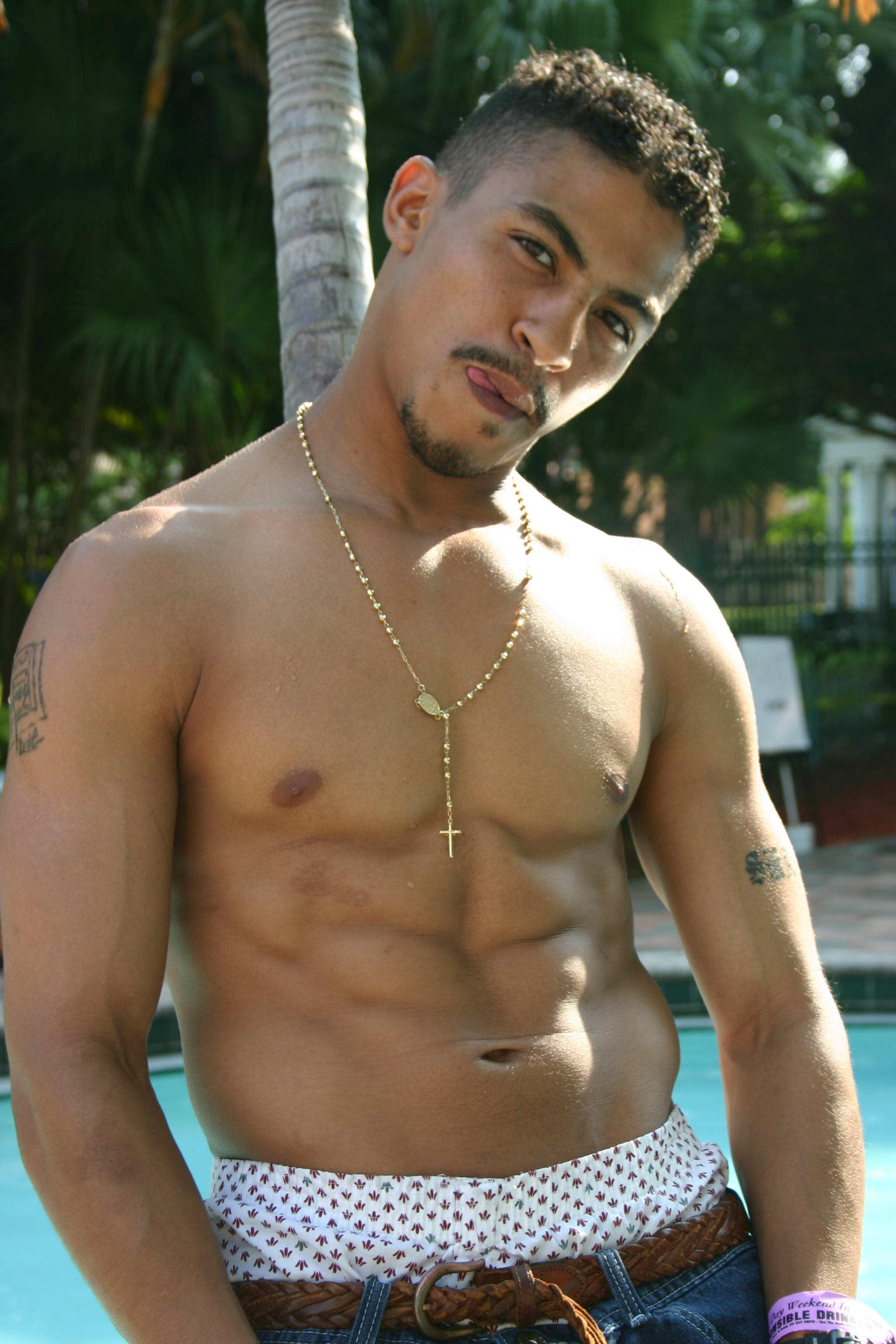
- Tyson in 2005
- Born: 20 May 1977 (age 48); Brooklyn, New York
- Occupations: Gay pornographic actor, model and film director
- Awards: GayVN Hall of Fame (2008); Blatino Erotica Awards Lifetime Achievement award (2008)

Tiger Tyson (born 20 May 1977) is an American pornographic film actor, model and film director. He has starred in many gay porn films released by Pittbull Productions under its Thugmart brand, specializing in "homo thug" porn featuring Black and Latino actors. Tyson is considered a highly recognizable figure within this genre.

Tyson was born in Brooklyn, and at age 19 debuted in the 1996 film Sweatin' Black, then starred in Tiger's Brooklyn Tails. In 2000, he started his own production label, Tiger Tyson Productions, beneath Pitbull Productions, Inc. He announced his retirement in 2004, but changed his mind following the success of the film Take 'Em Down. He has also worked as a go-go dancer and escort. In 2007, he endorsed Hillary Clinton's 2008 presidential campaign. The same year he received a lifetime achievement award at the Blatino Erotica Awards.

In 2010, author James Earl Hardy wrote a play entitled "Confessions of a Homo Thug Porn Star" based on Tyson's life, and presented it at Downtown Urban Arts Festival, where it won Best Short.

== Awards and nominations ==
Year	Ceremony	Result	Category	Film/Work
2007	GayVN Award	Won	Best Ethnic Film	The Show, Part 1, and Part 2
2007	Blatino Erotica Awards	Won	Lifetime Achievement	—N/a
2008	GayVN Award	Won	Best Ethnic Film	Tiger's Eiffel Tower: Paris Is Mine
2008	GayVN Award	Nominated	Best Actor	Tiger's Eiffel Tower: Paris Is Mine
2008	GayVN Award	Nominated	Best Non-European Film	—N/a
2008	GayVN Award	Nominated	Best Top	—N/a
2008	GayVN Award	Nominated	Best DVD Extras/Special Edition	Tiger's Eiffel Tower: Paris Is Mine
2008	GayVN Award	Nominated	Best Picture	Tiger's Eiffel Tower: Paris Is Mine
2008	GayVN Award	Nominated	Performer of the Year	—N/a
2008	Grabby Awards	Nominated	Best Performers	—N/a
2008	Grabby Awards	Nominated	Best DVD Extras	Tiger's Eiffel Tower: Paris Is Mine
2008	CyberSocket Web Awards	Nominated	Best Porn Star Site	Tiger-Tyson.com
2008	XBIZ Awards	Nominated	GLBT Performer of the Year	—N/a
2008	XBIZ Awards	Nominated	GLBT Studio of the Year	Pitbull Productions
2008	XBIZ Awards	Nominated	GLBT Feature Movie of the Year	Tiger's Eiffel Tower: Paris Is Mine
2008	European Gay Porn Awards	Won	Best Black/Latino Porn Site	Tiger-Tyson.com
2008	European Gay Porn Awards	Nominated	Best Top	Tiger's Eiffel Tower: Paris Is Mine
2011	CyberSocket Web Awards	Nominated	Best Video Company	Pitbull Productions
2011	CyberSocket Web Awards	Nominated	Best Porn Blog	Tiger Tyson Blog
2011	CyberSocket Web Awards	Nominated	Best Black Theme Site	Tiger-Tyson.com

== Bibliography ==
- Brennan, Brian. (2007). Latino Fan Club : photos. Santa Monica, Calif.: FotoFactory Press. ISBN 978-1-933841-21-2. OCLC 176956934.

== See also ==
- List of actors in gay pornographic films
