= Skrzypczak =

Skrzypczak is a Polish surname. Notable people with the surname include:

- Bettina Skrzypczak (born 1963), Polish composer
- Dariusz Skrzypczak (born 1967), Polish footballer and manager
- Hubert Skrzypczak (1943–2025), Polish boxer
- Mateusz Skrzypczak (born 2000), Polish footballer
- Michael Skrzypczak (1954–1988), American gay porn actor
- Waldemar Skrzypczak (1956–2025), Polish general
