= Topher DiMaggio =

American pornographic actor

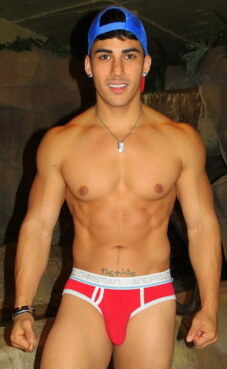
- Topher at Midtowne Spa, Dallas (2013)
- Born: Michael Romeo Christopher Fink; December 21, 1985 (age 40); Hawaii
- Other names: Romeo Fink; Romeo DiMaggio
- Occupations: Pornographic actor; model; real estate agent
- Years active: 2007–present
- Height: 5 ft 9 in (1.75 m)

Romeo Fink (born Michael Romeo Christopher Fink; 21 December 1985), better known as Topher DiMaggio, is an American gay pornographic film actor.

== Early and personal life ==
Fink was born and raised in Hawaii. He is half-Italian/French and half-Irish.

At the age of 17, he became an Abercrombie & Fitch model. He has also modelled for Maserati and Nordstrom. He is a hip-hop dancer as well.

== Career ==
=== Adult entertainment ===
In 2007, Topher made his pornographic debut with a solo video.

He has worked with numerous studios viz. Randy Blue, Falcon Studios, Jet Set Men, Dominic Ford, Lucas Entertainment, Raging Stallion Studios, CockyBoys, etc., winning the "Hottest Top" award at the Grabby Awards in 2014.

In 2016, he played the role of Superman in Men.com's gay porn parody of Batman v Superman: Dawn of Justice, titled Batman v Superman: A Gay XXX Parody, which was the Best Porn Parody winner at the 2017 Cybersocket Awards. He was also named a FleshJack Boy in 2017.

==== Rape and sexual assault allegations ====
In 2018, gay porn actor Tegan Zayne accused co-star DiMaggio of rape in a #MeToo post. Four other men came forward with their own allegations of sexual misconduct against DiMaggio, including YouTuber Bryan Hawn.

DiMaggio denied these allegations; however, he was placed on indefinite suspension by Andrew Christian, while FleshJack dissolved its relationship with him.

A year later in 2019, he made his comeback in porn with a scene for Treasure Island Media.

=== Modeling and other media ===
As a model, Topher started working with Andrew Christian in 2013, and became the face of the underwear line as their "Trophy Boy". He was one of the 15 models of varying ethnic backgrounds featured in Sex = Power = Freedom (2017), a photo book by Andrew Christian, who sought an inclusive and multicultural feel for the book, wanting to express the message of LGBTQ empowerment in the political sphere.

DiMaggio has starred in a documentary called Studlebrity (2016), which follows young men who have become celebrities only because of their looks.

In 2023, he participated and won in an episode of The Price Is Right where he was paired with Henry Nosa for a blind date.

=== Real estate ===
Fink worked as a real estate agent/salesperson in the state of California between 2023 and 2025, for Forward Beverly Hills Inc, Full Realty Services Inc, and then Wallstreet Realty Corp.
