= Tim Barnett =

Tim Barnett may refer to:

- Tim Barnett (politician) (born 1958), former New Zealand Labour Party politician and MP for Christchurch Central
- Tim Barnett (American football) (born 1968), American Football player who played for the Kansas City Chiefs
- "Tim Barnett", alias used by Bradford Thomas Wagner
