= Darius Ferdynand =

Hungarian gay porn actor and model

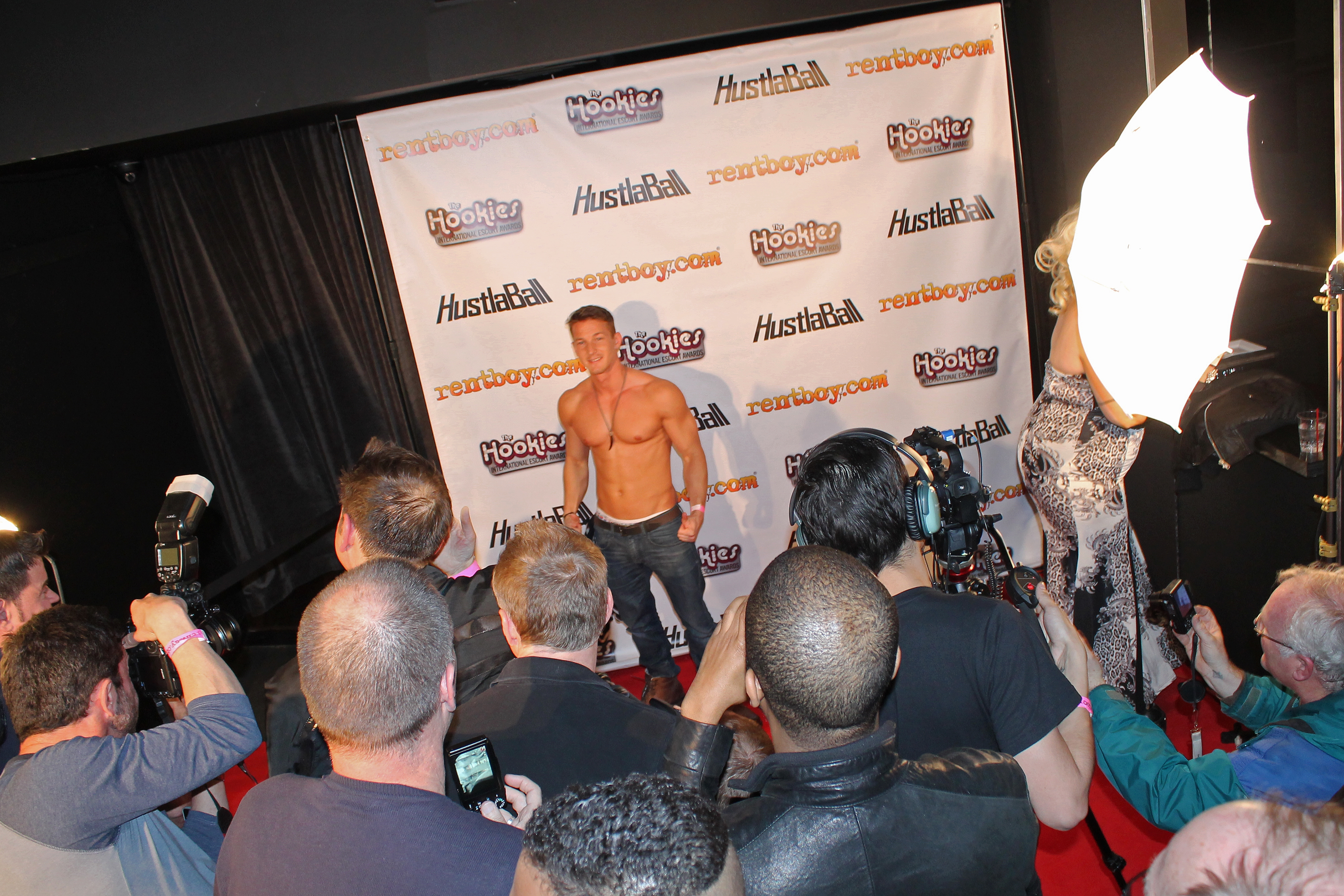
- Darius at International Escort Awards 2014
- Born: Péter Baranyai; March 14, 1988 (age 38); Budapest, Hungary
- Other name: Patrick Shean
- Years active: 2010–2019
- Height: 5 ft 7 in (170 cm)

Péter Baranyai (born March 14, 1988), better known as Darius Ferdynand, is a Hungarian former gay pornographic actor, escort, and model.

== Early life ==
Baranyai was born and grew up in Budapest, Hungary. He came out as gay when he was in school. He wanted to be an actor, so he attended a drama school where he studied acting, singing and dancing.

== Career ==
Baranyai worked for a theatre company, and acted in musical stage, short films, and commercials. Due to financial difficulties, he moved to London.

In London, he worked as an underwear model, and then made his porn debut in 2011 in a scene for the company Blake Mason, with William B as his partner. His porn name is composed of Polish names, and comes from his Polish origins.

He's worked for major porn studios in Europe and the US, appearing in films such as 69 Shades of Gay, Stretch My Hole and Darius Has a Big Fat Dick. In 2015, he won the "Best British Bottom" trophy at the Prowler Porn Awards.

He won awards in Miami Pro World Championships 2017— ranking 1st in Fitness Model Under 75kg CLASS B and winning Overall Fitness Model Under 75kg, and becoming the 2nd runner up in Mr. Model.

In 2018, he did a photoshoot for DNA. Baranyai has also been mentioned in Michael Hone's book Today's Homoerotic Film Giants.
