= Jon Vincent =

American gay pornographic actor

Jon Vincent

Jon Vincent (also known as Dave Phillips and John St. Vincent) (17 December 1962 – 3 May 2000) was an American pornographic actor who appeared in gay and bisexual pornography.

== Background ==
Vincent was known for his muscular body and hyper-masculine demeanor. He was also known for talking dirty and for saying harsh and degrading things to the men with whom he had sex in his films. "He was frequently rough with his co-stars, and was even known to put his fist through a wall during an argument with a director.", says a coworker. He identified as bisexual and appeared also in several bisexual porn films.

He co-authored his autobiography Thousand and One Night Stands. He was raised in Louisiana. He wanted to be a professional baseball player and signed with the Kansas City Royals when he was age 20, but either he was fired when involved in a conspiracy to sell cocaine or an injury ended that pursuit. At one point, he dated another late gay porn star Joey Stefano. He mentions only having sex with whites and Latinos in his autobiography, but British gay porn star Blue Blake states in his autobiography that Vincent had a preference for African-American men.

"Vincent was a thrill junkie: a compulsive seeker of sexual adventure, physical danger, steroids, alcohol, cocaine and finally heroin. Heroin was stronger than he was; it took over his life and finally killed him." He had been a severe drug addict for decades. At the age of 38, he died of a heroin overdose in New York City. He is interred with his father in a family crypt in Baton Rouge.

== Partial videography ==
- Idol Thoughts (1993, Catalina Video)

== Biography ==
- Carson, H. A. (2001). Thousand and One Night Stands: The Life of Jon Vincent. Authorhouse. ISBN 0-7596-3794-6.

== See also ==
- List of male performers in gay porn films
