= Christian Duffy =

American bodybuilder and actor

- Professional bodybuilder

Personal info
- Nickname: Bull Stanton
- Born: 1960 or 1961 (age 64–65)

Best statistics
- Height: 6 ft 1 in (1.85 m)
- Weight: 240 lb (109 kg) (contest); 260 lb (118 kg) (off-season)

Professional (Pro) career
- Pro-debut: 1992: NPC Nationals
- Best win: NPC Nationals; 1992
- Active: Retired c. 2002

External image
- Chris Duffy

Christian Duffy (born December 1961), also known as Chris Duffy, is an American former professional bodybuilder, who also worked as a gay porn actor in the gay pornography film industry under the pseudonym Bull Stanton.

== Early life ==
Duffy was an All-American in high-school football, and started to train as a bodybuilder during his teen years. Duffy's idol was bodybuilder Arnold Schwarzenegger.

== Career ==
=== Bodybuilder ===
In 1984, Duffy became the overall winner of the NPC Southern States bodybuilding championships. Three years later he placed first among heavyweights in the Los Angeles Championships, where he was also given the gold medal for the overall winner. His greatest achievement came in 1992 when he won the NPC Nationals in the heavyweight division—becoming the US national bodybuilding champion and obtaining the NPC Professional League card. The same year he was awarded the silver medal at another nationwide contest—the NPC USA Championships. Duffy would go on to compete in many bodybuilding contests, and placed fifth in the 2002 Mr. Olympia in the Masters division.

During the early 1990s, Duffy was a cover model, and some of his photographs were used in the Muscle & Fitness magazine.

=== Gay porn actor ===
From 1994, Duffy worked in the gay porn industry under the pseudonym Bull Stanton, and became a first widely acclaimed bodybuilder to appear in gay pornography. He was directed by Durk Dehner in The Wild Ones (1994), produced by Tom of Finland Company, and appeared in several film by Jack Fritscher that where focused on bodybuilders.

In late 1994, while divorcing his second wife, Duffy began a relationship with Michael Alago, who initially met Duffy as a gay escort. Alago's biography said that Duffy had entered the gay film industry to support his work as a male escort, and that he has ended his relationship with Joe Weider's International Federation of BodyBuilding & Fitness because "Weider wanted him to do too much work for too little money; and because he felt it was not right to be working as a bodybuilder while making adult videos". Alago recounted that Duffy told him he was also HIV positive; the relationship ended in 1996.

Duffy then entered a romantic relationship with fellow gay porn actor and ex-Royal Marine Blue Blake. They appeared in several movies together, including The Wild Ones and Nothin' Nice (1996), and posed for the cover of Advocate Men magazine in July 1994. Duffy speaks openly about his bisexuality. In the interview with Muscular Development he described himself as "hypersexual" and declared that he belongs to the LGBT community.

=== Retirement ===
Duffy kept training in bodybuilding gyms, and competed in Masters events, but also unsuccessfully attempted to become a professional golfer quoting Tiger Woods as this new inspiration. Duffy goes by the name Ian Anthony today and claims Florida as residence.

== Bodybuilding competitions ==
- 1984 Southern States – National Physique Committee (NPC) – Overall Winner
- 1985 Nationals – NPC, HeavyWeight, 10th
- 1987 Junior USA – NPC, HeavyWeight, 6th
- 1987 Los Angeles Championships – NPC, HeavyWeight, 1st
- 1987 Los Angeles Championships – NPC, Overall Winner
- 1992 Nationals – NPC, HeavyWeight, 1st and earned heavyweight professional card
- 1992 USA Championships – NPC, HeavyWeight, 2nd
- 1993 Chicago Pro Invitational – International Federation of BodyBuilding & Fitness (IFBB), 8th
- 1993 Night of Champions – IFBB, 15th
- 2002 Mr. Olympia – IFBB, Masters, 5th

== Filmography ==
- 1994: The Wild Ones (MarcoStudio)
- 1995: Sunset Bull (Palm Drive Video)
- 1996: Nothin' Nice (Hot House Studio)
- 2004: Bodybuilder's Jam 11 (Jimmy Z Productions)
- 2011: Party Pack 1 (Plain Wrapped Video)

== Magazine appearances ==
- August 1987 – Muscular Development, vol 24, no 8
- August 1987 – Muscle Training Illustrated, no 136
- March 1989 – Apolo/Argentino, no 242
- October 1991 – Muscle Training Illustrated, no 168
- October 1992 – Florida Muscle News, vol 5, no 10
- April 1993 – Muscle & Fitness, vol 54, no 4
- May 1993 – IronMan, vol 52, no 5
- August 1993 – Flex, vol 11, no 6
- October 1993 – Muscle & Fitness, vol 54, no 10
- July 1994 – Advocate Men (with his romantic partner Blue Blake)
- 1996 – Thrust
- 1998, 1999 – Manhood Rituals

== See also ==
- List of male performers in gay porn films
