= Arad Winwin =

Iranian American pornographic actor

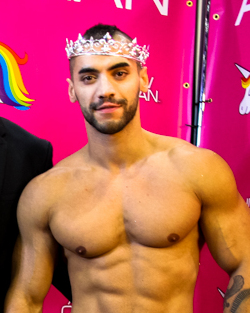
- Arad in 2018
- Born: Mahmoud Reza Asefi; 27 November 1989 (age 36); Tehran, Iran
- Occupation: Pornographic film actor
- Years active: 2014–present
- Height: 5 ft 10 in (178 cm)

Mahmoud Reza Asefi (Persian: محمودرضا آصفی; born 27 November 1989), better known by his stage name Arad Winwin, is an Iranian American gay pornographic film actor, model and bodybuilder.

== Early life ==
Winwin was born in Tehran, Iran, and grew up in a big family with two brothers. He spent most of his time doing sports like soccer, karate, weightlifting, and bodybuilding competitions. He joined the mandatory military service when he turned 18, and spent three years in active duty.

In 2010, at age 22, he fled Iran, because he believed he would never be happy due to the lack of political freedom in a country where he could be killed for being gay. He escaped through snowy mountains—walking for two nights and three days—to cross the border into Turkey. He had no passport, and his family had to pay a guide to take him halfway through the mountains. In Turkey, he was arrested for having a forged passport and imprisoned for six months.

In an interview with Gay Star News, Winwin said, "During this time Turkey was getting ready to deport me back to Iran where I would have been hanged for being a military deserter. I was able to get a message from prison to my family and they hired an attorney which contacted the United Nations refugee program. I was only accepted into their refugee program because the UN knew that I would be killed if I was sent back to Iran." He adds, "Being in a Turkish prison was horrible but I did meet other Iranian people in prison who were also trying to escape from Iran and they were the ones who told me about the United Nations refugee program that ultimately saved my life."

Winwin had to stay in Turkey for three years for all of the UN paperwork to be finished. He was then flown to Dallas, Texas, United States. His case worker helped him get a job at an elevator company, but it did not pay much, and he spent the next year trying to pay off his airline tickets, as is required by the UN.

== Career ==
=== Adult entertainment ===
Winwin moved to Los Angeles, where he became a go-go boy to make more money. While there, he learned about the men's clothing company Andrew Christian, and eventually became one of their "Trophy Boys".

Winwin made his pornographic film debut with Next Door Studios in 2014, and became a Falcon Studios Exclusive in 2019.

In 2018, Winwin starred in Bruce LaBruce's It Is Not the Pornographer That Is Perverse... in the segment "Purple Army Faction". LaBruce considered the segment to be the sexiest film set he had ever been on, as it had a three-way between Francois Sagat, Winwin, and Dato Foland.

In the same year, Winwin starred in Men.com's first scene featuring MMF bisexual porn, titled The Challenge. It created controversy over whether bisexual porn belongs on a gay porn website. Winwin, who is a self-identified gay man, faced backlash from fans for acting in the scene, with some accusing him of being straight or of having "converted" to heterosexuality or bisexuality. Winwin told the gay website Str8UpGayPorn that "I'm a gay man...This was only a job, and it was nothing more. Nothing personal. I was working, and it was like any other scene I've done".

=== Bodybuilding ===
Winwin has participated in bodybuilding competitions under his real name.

Year	Contest	Division	Category	Rank	Reference
2014	NPC Europa Super Show	Men's Bodybuilding	Middleweight	1st	
2014	NPC Ronnie Coleman Classic	Men's Bodybuilding	Middleweight	4th	
2014	NPC Ronnie Coleman Classic	Men's Bodybuilding	Novice Lightweight	1st	
2014	NPC Ronnie Coleman Classic	Men's Physique	Class A	16th	
2018	NPC MuscleContest Excalibur	Men's Bodybuilding	Novice Light Heavyweight	2nd	
2018	NPC MuscleContest Excalibur	Men's Bodybuilding	Light Heavyweight	6th	
2018	NPC MuscleContest Excalibur	Men's Classic Physique	Class B	7th	

== Public image and political views ==
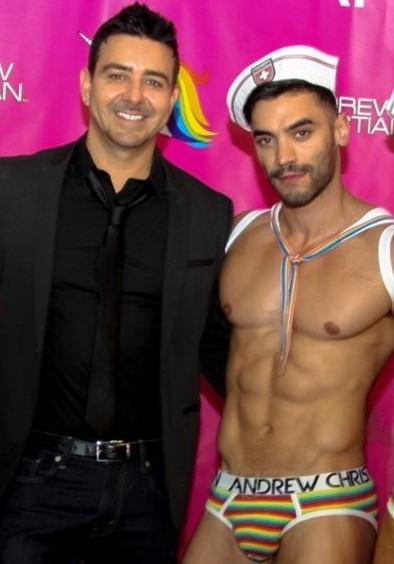
Andrew Christian and Arad Winwin at RuPaul's DragCon LA 2019

Winwin was one of the 15 models of varying ethnic backgrounds featured in Sex = Power = Freedom (2017), a photo book by Andrew Christian, who sought an inclusive and multicultural feel for the book, wanting to express the message of LGBTQ empowerment in the political sphere.

In the light of Donald Trump's travel ban in January 2017, Christian told Gay Star News, "Arad's story is a reminder of how offering refugees a home in the US can not only transform their lives but may actually save their lives. It is a tragedy that our LGBT brothers and sisters will die, along with many others, because of Trumps [sic] new extreme vetting policy."

Speaking out against the immigration ban, Winwin said, "I am extremely saddened by Trump's new policy on immigration I think it is important for Americans to know that people are seeking refugee status in the USA because they love America for the freedom this country provides. I am sure the new policy will create much needless suffering among innocent people who just want a better life and the policy may even be counterproductive if extremists use it as part of their message of hate."

On November 6, 2024, following the 2024 United States presidential election, Winwin shared an Instagram post congratulating and showing support for Donald Trump. In a subsequent interview with Out, Winwin criticized Democrats, Joe Biden, the LGBTQ community, and drag queens, and referred to those who responded negatively towards his Instagram post as "haters" and "insane". However, he also stated that had Kamala Harris won the election, he would have congratulated her as well. Previous posts on Instagram by Winwin were critical of Harris, Michelle Obama, Oprah Winfrey, and Joe Biden.
