= Bradford Thomas Wagner =

American real estate agent, porno actor and suspected serial rapist

- Wagner under his stage name, Tim Barnett, in An Officer and His Gentlemen (1995)
- Born: March 31, 1968; Bismarck, North Dakota, U.S.
- Died: July 13, 2005 (aged 37); Boulder, Colorado, U.S.
- Other name: Tim Barnett
- Occupations: Real estate agent and pornographic film star

Bradford Thomas Wagner (March 31, 1968 – July 13, 2005) was an American real estate agent and former pornographic film actor who committed suicide while in police custody as a suspected serial rapist.

== Early life and career ==
Wagner was born in 1968 in Bismarck, North Dakota. He had a brother and three sisters.

Under the stage name Tim Barnett, he appeared in more than twenty gay pornographic films in the early 1990s. He had also worked as a part-time ski instructor and as a real estate agent in Aspen, Colorado.

== Arrest and death ==
Police arrested Wagner in June 2004. He was a suspect in the rapes of five women between 1993 and 1998 at the Tantra Lake and Bridgewalk apartment complexes in Boulder, Colorado, an unsolved 1994 rape case in Lakewood, Colorado, and another in 1995 in Austin, Texas. According to law enforcement officials, DNA evidence linked him to the crimes.

Wagner hanged himself with a bed sheet in his jail cell in Boulder and died July 13, 2005. He was 37.

== See also ==
- List of male performers in gay porn films
