= Eric Stryker =

American pornographic actor (1954-1988)

- Born: Michael Skrzypcak; September 24, 1954; Erie, Pennsylvania, U.S.
- Died: February 19, 1988 (aged 33); Sherman Oaks, Los Angeles, California, U.S.
- Other names: Noel Kemp, Mike Kelly, Mike Saunders, Michael John Saunders
- Height: 6 ft 0 in (1.83 m)

Michael Skrzypcak (September 24, 1954 – February 19, 1988) best known by his stage name Eric Stryker, was an American gay pornographic performer and model. He was known for his handsome blond features and his muscular physique. He also performed as Noel Kemp for Colt Studio, Mike Kelly, Mike Saunders and, Michael John Saunders.

In 1984, shortly after his lover died from AIDS, Stryker was diagnosed with HIV. Stryker continued his studies in architecture at Woodbury University and his regular workouts. He said in 1987, "I live for the day." Stryker worked with the AIDS Couples Group and lectured around the country for AIDS Project Los Angeles. In 1987, he appeared in the documentary It Starts with A, his last film appearance. In his last public appearance, his body showing the effects of Kaposi's sarcoma, Stryker marched in the Christopher Street West parade in Los Angeles in a tank top and shorts, becoming one of the early persons with the disease to publicly display its symptoms. Stryker died of AIDS on February 19, 1988, at age 33 at Sherman Oaks Community Hospital.

== See also ==
- List of male performers in gay porn films
