= Robert Van Damme =

Czech gay pornographic film actor

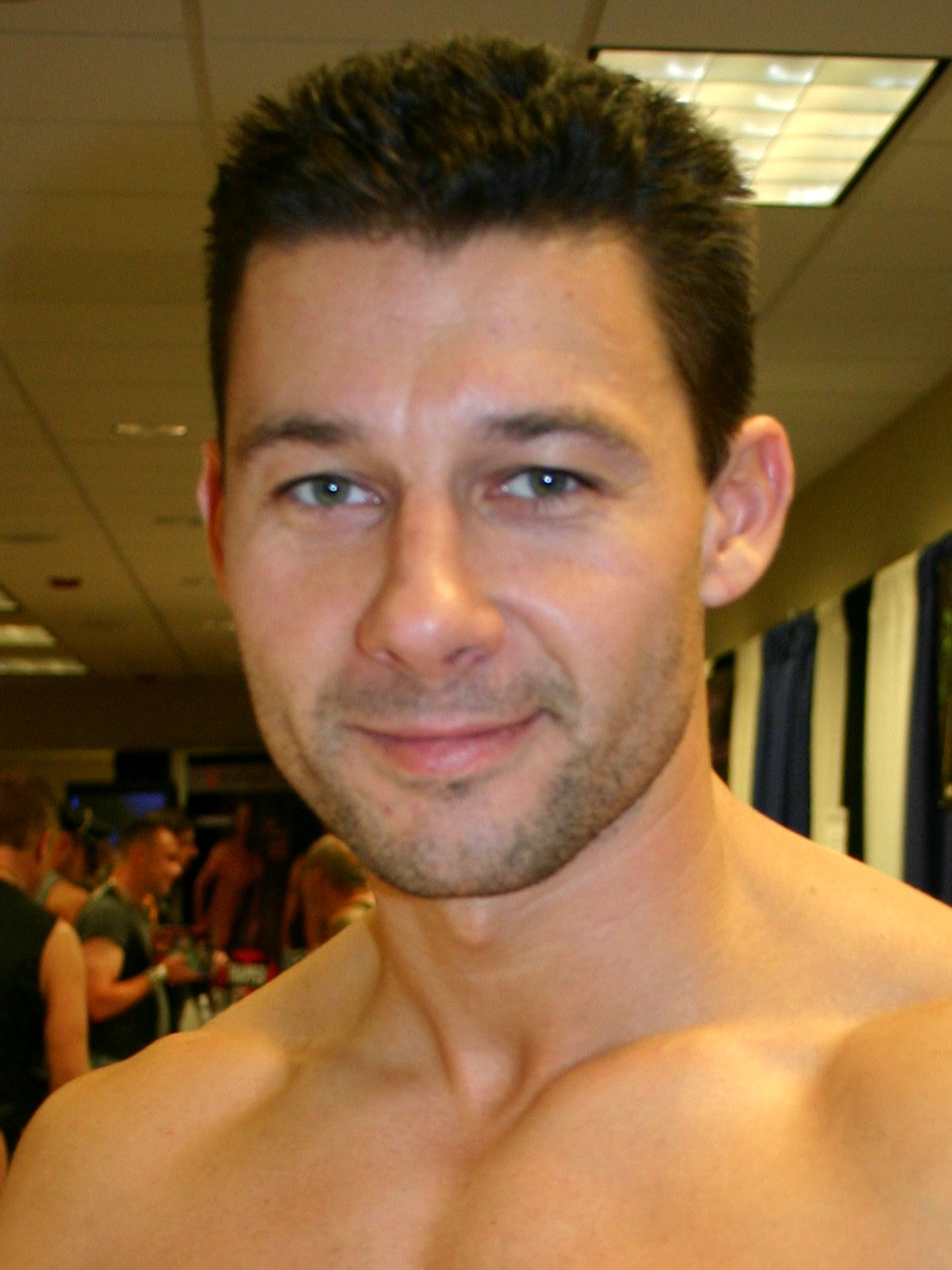
- Van Damme in 2006
- Born: Robert Kovařík; 11 August 1969 (age 57); Czechoslovakia
- Occupations: Gay pornography actor; former ice hockey player
- Criminal charges: Armed robbery

Robert Kovařík (born 11 August 1969), known professionally as Robert Van Damme, is a Czech-French gay pornographic film actor, director, and producer, and former ice hockey player. After making his pornography debut in 2003, he became an exclusive model with Hot House Entertainment in 2005 and founded his own gay pornography studio, RVD Films, in 2009. In 2014, Kovařík was sentenced to nine years in prison by a Czech court for a series of armed robberies committed between 1999 and 2000.

== Biography ==
Kovařík was born in Czechoslovakia. In the 1990s, he was an ice hockey player for LHK Jestřábi Prostějov, and later played for MBK Vyškov.

Kovařík was charged by Czech authorities with leading a group that committed two armed robberies in Prostějov in 1999 and 2000. He remained in police custody for two years, the maximum length under Czech law a suspect can be detained without guilt being proven, before being released. In 2003 he departed the Czech Republic for the United States, and was subsequently sentenced in absentia to ten years in prison for robbery and theft of amounts exceeding 5 million Kč. Kovařík has contended that he was a participant in a motor vehicle theft ring, but has denied any role in leading robberies.

While living in California, Kovařík was scouted by the American gay pornography studio Blue Blake Productions, and made his debut as a gay pornographic actor under the stage name "Robert Van Damme" in 2003. Van Damme gained popularity as a gay-for-pay "power top" performer, making his feature-length debut in the Mustang Studios film The Hunted in 2005 and signing an exclusive contract with Hot House Entertainment that same year.

A Czech court issued an arrest warrant for Kovařík in 2006. In February 2009, Kovařík co-founded with his then-wife the gay pornography studio RVD Films. It released its first film, Robert Van Damme's Private Party, in March of that year; the film was also Kovařík's directorial debut. That same year, he was inducted into the Grabby Awards Hall of Fame and won Best New Director at the Hard Choice Awards. In 2010, RVD Films began distributing its films through the video on demand website GayMovies.com.

On 21 May 2010, Kovařík was arrested in Los Angeles and detained by U.S. Immigration and Customs Enforcement. His deportation was authorized by the U.S. State Department in March 2013, and he was extradited to the Czech Republic in May that year. A court panel sentenced him to nine years in prison.

== Accolades ==
Year	Award / Festival	Category	Result	Refs.
2009	Grabby Awards	Hall of Fame	Won	
2009	Hard Choice Awards	Best New Director	Won	
