= Paul Barresi =

American pornographic actor

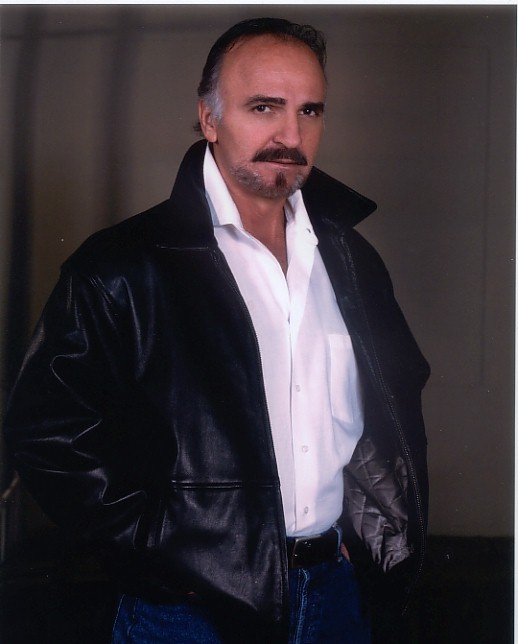
- Born: 1949 (age 76–77); Lynn, Massachusetts, U.S.
- Occupations: Actor, model, director, Hollywood Fixer, author
- Years active: 1970s – present
- Military career
- Branch: United States Air Force
- Service years: 1968–1972
- Rank: Sergeant

Paul Barresi (born 1949) is an American former pornographic actor, former pornographic film director, and media personality.

== Early life and military career ==
Born in Lynn, Massachusetts, when Barresi was 12 his family moved to Annapolis, Maryland, for his father's job at the United States Naval Academy. Barresi was offered a wrestling scholarship to the University of Maryland but opted to instead enlist in the United States Air Force during the height of the Vietnam War. Barresi served at bases in the United States and the Philippines, and he was honorably discharged as a sergeant in 1971 after completing his tour at March Air Force Base. Upon returning to civilian life, he soon began working as a fitness trainer at a gym in nearby Riverside, California.

== Work in modeling, theater and film ==
In March 1974, Barresi was featured in Playgirl magazine with Cassandra Peterson. The following year he was selected by Rip Colt as an early Colt model and featured on the cover of the November 1975 of Mandate. In December 1978, Barresi was the first man ever to appear on the cover of Hustler. The print modeling led to dozens of offers to star in adult film. Barresi's natural muscular build and unique persona on film made him into one the highest paid and most sought after adult film icons of the '70s, starring in adult film classics including Co-ed Fever, Bad Girls II, All American Girls II and Secret of Stage Five.

Barresi wrote, produced and directed adult films. In 1992 Barresi, using the name "Joe Hammer", won the Gay Video Guide Award in the Best Specialty Release category for the fetish video Razor Close. Barresi earned a 2003 GayVN Awards nomination for "Best Non-Sex Performance — Gay or Bi" for Long Strokes. Barresi also won the 2007 GayVN award and a 2007 Grabby Award for "Best Non-Sex Performance" for his work in Velvet Mafia (parts 1 and 2). And in 2008, Barresi was inducted into the GayVN Hall of Fame. Barresi was particularly noted for his military themes; Adult Video News has said Barresi's directorial efforts make him "undisputedly the king of military-themed videos."

Barresi toured in a 1980 summer stock suite of scenes from Neil Simon plays, headlined by Paul Lynde. He had several roles in mainstream film and television projects, including Perfect, Spontaneous Combustion, JAG and Father Dowling Mysteries. Barresi told Entertainment Tonight of the difficulty crossing over into mainstream film: "No one really takes a porn actor seriously ... and no one really respects a porn actor."
