= Joey Stefano =

American gay pornographic actor (1968–1994)

- Born: Nicholas Anthony Iacona Jr. January 1, 1968; Chester, Pennsylvania, U.S.
- Died: November 26, 1994 (aged 26); Los Angeles, California
- Height: 5 ft 10 in (1.78 m)

Joey Stefano (born Nicholas Anthony Iacona Jr.; January 1, 1968 – November 26, 1994) was an American pornographic actor who appeared in gay pornographic films.

== Career ==
Born Nicholas Anthony Iacona Jr., Stefano grew up in Chester, Pennsylvania. His father, Nicholas Sr., was a union painter who died of colon cancer when Stefano was 15. After the death of his father, Stefano began using drugs and was eventually sent to rehab for six months. After rehab, he tried to become a model and built a portfolio. In 1989, he met a gay porn actor named Tony Davis who helped him enter into the gay adult film industry.

Stefano's adult film career took off after meeting Chi Chi LaRue during a trip to Los Angeles. Stefano's looks were well received and his persona as a "hungry bottom" (sexually submissive but verbally demanding) contributed to his popularity. His image and success caught the attention of Madonna, who used him as a model in her 1992 book Sex. While he was a popular performer, Stefano's family had no idea he was gay nor were they aware that he was performing in adult films. According to Stefano's older sister Linda, he told the family that he was a male model. She later found out about his real occupation but did not inform their mother.

During his lifetime, he was the subject of rumors regarding his relationships with prominent entertainment industry figures who were known to be gay. At a May 1990 dinner and interview with Jess Cagle (Entertainment Weekly) and Rick X (host of Manhattan Cable TV's The Closet Case Show), Stefano discussed an alleged series of "dates" with David Geffen, who at one point implored Stefano to quit using drugs. After the videotaped interview appeared on Rick X's show, OutWeek Magazine "outed" Geffen, who went on to announce his homosexuality at an AIDS fundraiser.

Stefano danced at the Gaiety Theatre in the late 1980s and early 1990s. A biography, Wonder Bread and Ecstasy, was written about him by Charles Isherwood that touches on his life as an erotic dancer at the Gaiety.

Over the course of his five-year career, Stefano appeared in 58 gay adult films, and two music videos with Madonna. Despite his success, Stefano did not save his earnings and relapsed into drug and alcohol abuse. Contrary to rumor he was never officially diagnosed as HIV+ by any medical professionals.

== Death ==
On November 26, 1994, Stefano's body was found in a motel room in Hollywood. It was later determined by the Medical Examiner that he died of an accidental speedball overdose (in his case, a mixture of cocaine, morphine, heroin, and ketamine). He was 26.

He is buried next to his father, Nicholas A. Iacona Sr., in the Immaculate Heart of Mary Cemetery in Linwood, Pennsylvania.

== Legacy ==
In 1996, Stefano's life was chronicled in the book, Wonder Bread and Ecstasy: The Life and Death of Joey Stefano by Charles Isherwood. A second biography of the actor, Joey Stefano: The Life, Loves & Legacy of the Prince of Passion by British celebrity biographer David Bret was published in 2015.

His life is the subject of a one-man-play, Homme Fatale: The Fast Life and Slow Death of Joey Stefano, by Australian playwright Barry Lowe.

In 2010, Director Chad Darnell began working on a film based on Stefano's life, tentatively titled X-Rated. As of 2020, the film is still in development.

== Awards ==
- 1990 XRCO Award – Newcomer
- 1995 AVN Award – Gay Video Performer of the Year
- 1997 AVN Hall of Fame

== See also ==
- List of male performers in gay porn films

Awards
Preceded by Tim Lowe for Fratrimony	AVN Awards for Best Actor-Gay Video for More of a Man; 1991	Succeeded by Ryan Yeager for Jumper
Preceded by -	AVN Awards for Best Performer of the Year-Gay Video; 1995	Succeeded by J.T. Sloan
