= Cybersocket, Inc. =

American multimedia publishing company

Cybersocket
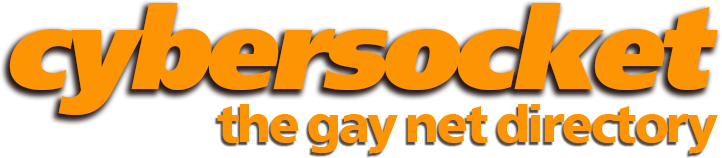
- Founded: 1997; 29 years ago
- Defunct: 2023; 3 years ago
- Headquarters: West Hollywood, California
- Area served: Worldwide
- Key people: Morgan Sommer (co-founder); Tim Lutz (co-founder)
- Products: Books; website; magazine; event
- Parent: NSFW.Army (since 2021)

Cybersocket, Inc. was an American multimedia publishing company based in West Hollywood, California. It was founded in 1997 by Morgan Sommer and Tim Lutz. Their initial venture was the annual Cybersocket Directory, a printed guide specifically for gay pornographic websites. In 1998, the company expanded significantly by launching a website, which featured an even broader directory and quality reviews. Concurrently, they introduced a free monthly print magazine that covered gay adult films, websites, and industry events. This magazine quickly rose to prominence, becoming the largest freely distributed gay print magazine in the United States. Cybersocket was recognized by five XBIZ Awards and an AVN Award.

Beyond publishing, Cybersocket also facilitated business-to-business networking events crucial for the gay adult entertainment industry. The company established the Cybersocket Web Awards from 2000–2022 to recognize the LGBT Internet community. Following Lutz's death in August 2021, Cybersocket and all its associated properties were sold to NSFW.Army, the owner of Fleshbot. The two publications officially merged in 2023, forming Fleshbot x Cybersocket, which subsequently hosted month-long gay porn celebrations.

== History ==
=== 1996–1997: Beginning with Cybersocket Directory ===
In 1996, Morgan Sommer left his job as a geophysical technician and relocated from San Diego to Los Angeles, where he began his career as a performer in gay adult pornography. Five months into his career, he met Tim Lutz, who would later become both his business partner and boyfriend. Together, they conceived the business idea of publishing a book that repackaged public domain information. "We decided to focus on a niche market in order to give our new publication an identity that stood out from the massive amounts of printed material in the marketplace", Sommer stated. They came up with the annual Cybersocket Gay Net Directory, a paperback guide to gay and lesbian pornographic websites, which was first released in 1997. The creators organized the information, utilized QuarkXPress, and compiled the first edition. Cybersocket was based in West Hollywood.

The first directory proved successful; its sales were sufficient to support the creators, allow them to reinvest in the following year's edition, and upgrade their equipment. After its release, Sommer ceased performing in pornography and dedicated his attention to building the company. He retained many of his industry contacts; many of the companies he had worked for as a model became the first advertisers on Cybersocket. After being suggested that their information would be more useful and searchable as a website, Blakey St. John, the company's webmaster, exported the organized data to the Internet and transformed it into a search engine. St. John later partnered with Sommer and Lutz to establish Bionic Pixels, a web design and development company.

=== 1998–2019: Rise to prominence with online publication ===
The official Cybersocket website was launched in 1998, featuring an expansion of the Cybersocket Gay Net Directory, and reviews of gay pornographic videos and websites. A year later, the company published a free monthly periodical, titled Cybersocket Magazine, that covers gay adult films, websites, performers, novelties, and events. The magazine was distributed in print and also accessible on the Cybersocket website, boasting an audited national circulation of 70,000 copies per issue. It grew to become the largest freely distributed gay print magazine in the US. By 2005, it was estimated that over 1 million readers were monthly reached through Cybersocket's print and electronic properties. Following suggestions from his advertisers, Sommer later created TheGayBoard, a webmaster forum, as a response to GayWideWebmasters in 2005. Three years later, Cybersocket joined GunzBlazing to launch a DVD online store, expanded its free national distribution to cities like Houston and New York, and revamped its website to feature more editorially driven content. The 10th and final Cybersocket Directory was released in 2010, with over 1,500 sites reviewed in 60 categories.

By the end of the 2010s, Cybersocket's gay and lesbian directories were recognized as among the most useful and largest. AVN opined that the site had propelled its creators to become two of the most influential men in the industry. In 2010, Sommer won the AVN Award for Internet Founders Branch for his contribution to Cybersocket. At the XBIZ Awards, Cybersocket won for Gay Web Company of the Year in 2016, and the GLBT Company of the Year in 2005–2007 and 2009. In addition, Cybersocket regularly hosted B2B networking events for the gay adult entertainment industry in conjunction with major adult industry gatherings such as the XBIZ Conference, The Phoenix Forum, and the European Summit.

=== 2020–2023: Acquired by NSFW.Army ===
In November 2020, Tim Lutz was diagnosed with a malignant, methylated glioblastoma. A GoFundMe campaign was initiated to help fund his cancer treatments. Lutz died on August 20, 2021, at his home in Palm Springs. Upon his diagnosis, Sommer had to implement organizational changes within their business to allow Lutz to concentrate on his recovery. Cybersocket and its associated properties were sold to NSFW.Army, the owner of Fleshbot, in June 2021. Morgan stated that the decision to sell Cybersocket came when "it was clear it was time for us both to let it go." The decision was made due to shifts in the industry, as well as personal, professional, and COVID-19 related complications. A representative noted that Cybersocket and all related properties would receive "a thorough redesign and complete refresh."

In January 2023, NSFW.Army merged Cybersocket and its staff with Fleshbot Gay to create a "mega-hub." The publication, sometimes referred to as Fleshbot x Cybersocket, subsequently hosted month-long gay porn celebrations, starting with Fetish Month that same January. They also picked an adult performer as a monthly "Cybersocket Stud".

== Cybersocket Web Awards ==
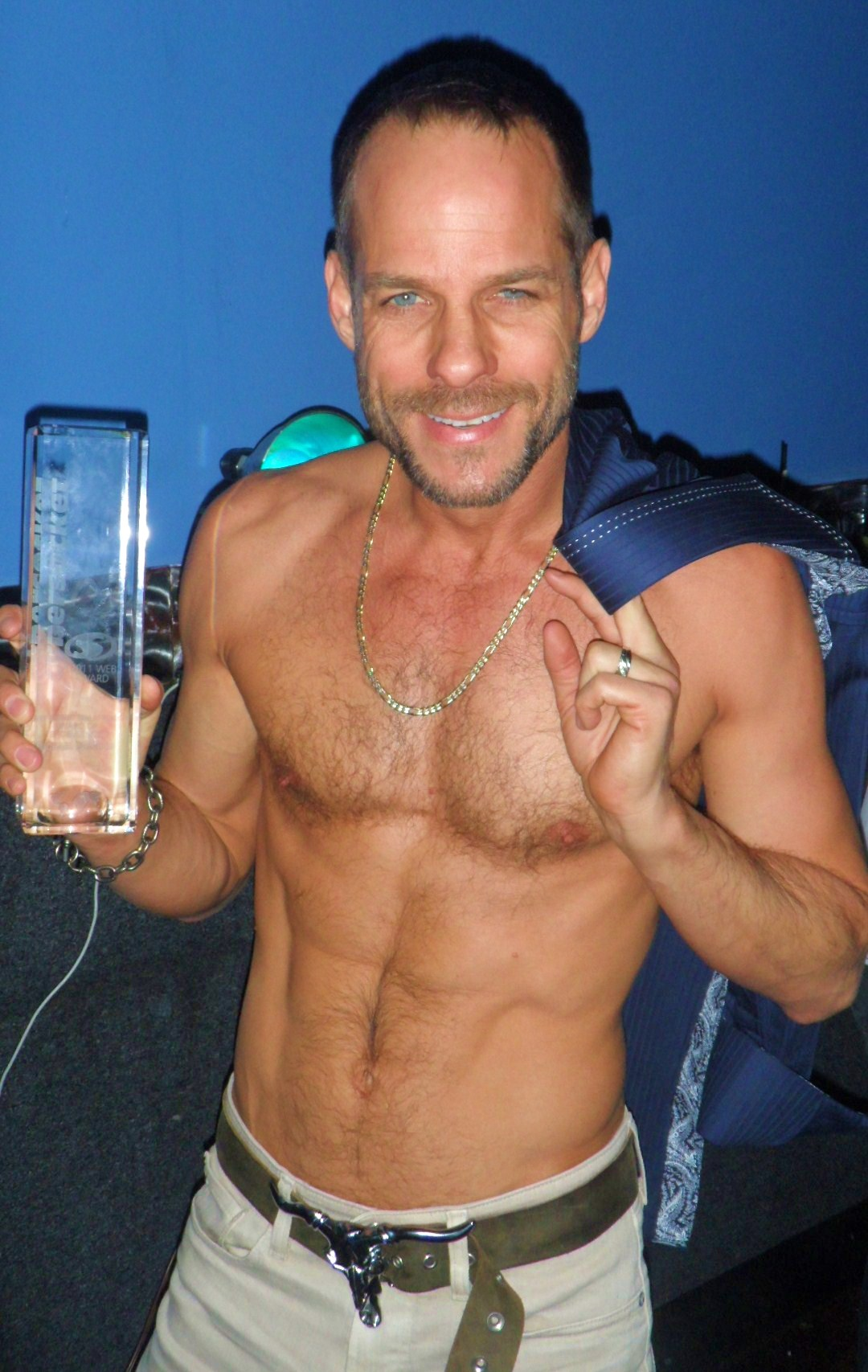
Michael Brandon at the 2011 Cybersocket Web Awards. He has won the Best Porn Star award twice.

In 2000, Cybersocket, Inc. established an annual event called the Cybersocket Web Awards. The awards recognize individuals, companies, and projects for their contributions to the LGBT Internet community during the preceding calendar year. Since 2005, individual categories have been divided into Industry Choice and Surfer's Choice Awards. Additionally, in 2010, a special award for Free Speech Coalition was given to Corbin Fisher, followed by the Wall of Fame award the subsequent years. The last award season was in 2022.

=== Notable categories ===
==== Best Porn Star ====
- 2001: Ken Ryker
- 2002: Jeff Palmer
- 2003: Matthew Rush
- 2004: Michael Brandon
- 2005: Michael Brandon
- 2006: Zeb Atlas
- 2007: Pierre Fitch
- 2008: Brent Corrigan
- 2009: Colin O'Neal
- 2010: Reese Rideout
- 2011: Steve Cruz
- 2012: Brent Everett
- 2013: Dean Monroe
- 2014: Johnny Rapid
- 2015: Jimmy Durano
- 2016: Antonio Biaggi
- 2017: Kyle Ross
- 2018: Wesley Woods
- 2019: Pierce Paris
- 2020: Pierce Paris
- 2022: Cade Maddox (as Performer of the Year)

==== Best Personality ====
- 2008: Michael Lucas
- 2009: Cody Cummings
- 2010: Wolf Hudson
- 2011: Chi Chi LaRue
- 2012: Chi Chi LaRue
- 2013: Austin Wilde
- 2014: Steve Peña
- 2015: Sister Roma
- 2016: Colby Keller
- 2017: Bianca Del Rio
- 2018: mr. Pam
- 2019: Sister Roma
- 2020: Wesley Woods
- 2022: Cutler X (as Influencer of the Year)

==== Wall Of Fame Award of Excellence ====
- 2011: Michael Brandon
- 2012: Steven Scarborough
- 2013: Randy Whitley
- 2014: Tim Valenti
- 2015: Michael Lucas
- 2016: Trenton Ducati
- 2017: Gary Jackson
- 2018: Kathi Stout
- 2019: Keith Miller
- 2020: Dominic Ford
- 2022: Trenton Ducati and Chi Chi LaRue (as Legacy Award)
