= Johnny Hazzard =

American pornographic film actor (born 1977)

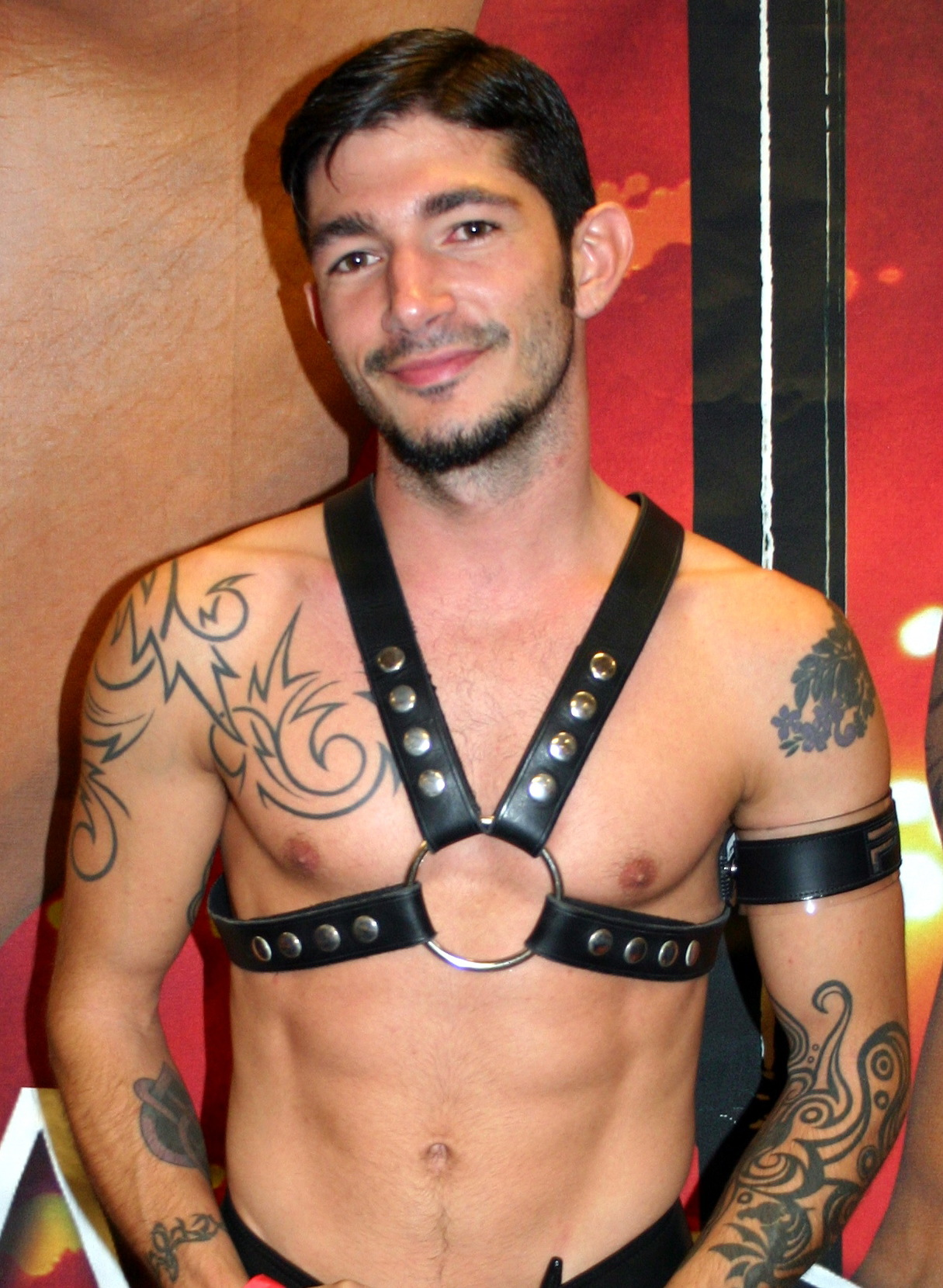
- Born: Frankie Valenti; Cleveland, Ohio, U.S.
- Years active: 2000–present
- Height: 5 ft 8 in (1.73 m)

Johnny Hazzard (born Frankie Valenti) is an American former pornographic actor, model, and recording artist who performs in gay and bisexual pornographic films for a number of studios, mainly Rascal Video, and has appeared in mainstream film and television productions under his own name.

He began his career in porn in 2003. Most of his porn videos were directed by Chi Chi LaRue. In August 2008, he worked on a controversial bisexual film directed by LaRue titled Shifting Gears, although he only performed in an all-male scene. He was also a music reviewer for the now defunct Frontiers magazine.

Hazzard joined the cast of the here! original television series The Lair in seasons two and three under his birth-name, Frankie Valenti. In 2014, he appeared in the film Tiger Orange, for which he received positive critical reviews.

== Awards ==
Adult Erotic Gay Video Awards ("Grabbys")

- 2003
- 2004
  - Best Duo Sex Scene with Zak Spears in Bolt, Rascal Video; tied with Tag Adams and Aiden Shaw in Perfect Fit, Hot House Entertainment
  - Best Group Sex Scene with Rod Barry, Theo Blake, Alex Lemonde, Kyle Lewis, Dillon Press, Troy Punk, Shane Rollins, Rob Romoni, Anthony Shaw and Sebastian Tauza in Bolt
- 2006
  - Best Performers with Brad Benton
  - Best Three-Way Sex Scene with Marcus Iron and Tommy Ritter in Wrong Side of the Tracks Part One, Rascal Video
  - Best Group Award with Matthew Rush, Mitchell Rock, Landon Conrad and Drew Cutler in Playing With Fire 4: Alarm

GayVN Awards

- 2004
  - Best Group Scene with Matt Summers, Logan Reed, Chad Hunt, Matt Majors, Andy Hunter, and Mike Johnson in Detention, Rascal Video
- 2005
  - Best Group Scene with Rod Barry, Theo Blake, Alex Lemonde, Kyle Lewis, Dillon Press, Troy Punk, Shane Rollins, Rob Romoni, Anthony Shaw, and Sebastian Tauza in Bolt
- 2006
  - Best Actor in Wrong Side of the Tracks Part One and Part Two, Rascal Video
  - Best Sex Scene: Duo with Tyler Riggz in Wrong Side of the Tracks Part One, Rascal Video
  - Best Solo Performance in Wrong Side of the Tracks Part One, Rascal Video

Awards
Preceded by Johnny Hazzard, Matt Summers, Logan Reed, Chad Hunt, Matt Majors, Andy Hunter, Mike Johnson, for Detention	GayVN Award for Best Group Scene, 2005; With: Rod Barry, Theo Blake, Alex Lemonde, Kyle Lewis, Dillon Press, Troy Punk, Shane Rollins, Rob Romoni, Anthony Shaw, and Sebastian Tauza, for Bolt	Succeeded by Huessein, Joey Russo, Sarib, JC, Colin West, for Arabesque
Preceded by Dean Phoenix for BuckleRoos Part I and Part II	GayVN Award for Best Actor for Wrong Side of the Tracks Part One and Part Two; 2006	Succeeded by Michael Lucas for Michael Lucas' La Dolce Vita
Preceded by Dean Phoenix & Marcus Iron for BuckleRoos Part II	GayVN Award for Best Sex Scene, Duo, with Tyler Riggz, for Wrong Side of the Tracks Part One; 2006	Succeeded by Brad Patton & Brian Hansen, for Manly Heat: Quenched
Preceded by Arpad Miklos/Ricky Martinez for BuckleRoos Part I	GayVN Award for Best Solo Performance for Wrong Side of the Tracks Part One; 2006	Succeeded by Kent North for At Your Service
Preceded by Brad Benton, Owen Hawk, Diego De Lahoya, for BuckleRoos Part I	"Grabby" Award for Best Three-Way Sex Scene, 2006; With: Marcus Iron & Tommy Ritter, for Wrong Side of the Tracks Part One	Succeeded by (To Be Awarded in 2007)

== Model ==
- Chi Chi LaRue: XXXclusive 2007 Calendar (2007, 12 month calendar) ISBN 3-86187-731-7
- Chi Chi LaRue's warning (2005, 128 pages)
- Chi Chi LaRue: Live and Raw (2004, 80 pages)
- Chi Chi LaRue's Bolt: The Book
- Rascal Magazine: Special Collector's Edition (128 pages)
- Adam Gay Video 2004 Directory—Cover with Matt Summers and Kyle Kennedy

== Music ==
Hazzard released his debut single, "Deeper Into You," in 2006.

== Personal life ==
Hazzard was born and raised in the suburbs of Cleveland, Ohio. He is gay.

== See also ==
- List of male performers in gay porn films
- List of Grabby recipients
