= Drake Von =

American pornographic actor and adult model (born 2002)

- Born: Dawson Bacon; November 8, 2002 (age 23); United States
- Occupations: Actor; model

Dawson William Yeoman Bacon (born November 8, 2002), best known as Drake Von, is an American pornographic film actor. He is the identical twin brother of Silas Brooks, with whom he operated the OnlyFans account The Baconator Twins.

== Early life and career ==
Bacon was born on November 8, 2002. He has an identical twin brother named Silas Brooks. Using the "Drake Von" name, he began making porn shortly after turning 18, and became popular for his topping content. He and his brother created an OnlyFans account named The Baconator Twins. Von appeared on Austin Wolf's Collab Week in late 2023, and was nominated for eight awards and won Favorite Twink and Favorite Cock at the 2024 GayVN Awards.

By November 2024, Bacon had filmed twelve scenes for Men.com including "College Cum Fiesta" and "Thanks4giving Me Anal". He signed an exclusivity contract with the firm that month; among his first exclusive scenes was a video with Joey Mills that featured his first topping video and Bacon's first bottoming. He had based himself in Las Vegas by December 2024, and won Best Twink and Hottest All-Male Creator Collab at that year's GayVN Awards. By April 2025, Bacon had begun feuding with Brooks; the following month, he hosted Ultra Load: The Gay Village in May 2025, an LGBTQ+ pool party festival held during that year's Electric Daisy Carnival.

By July 2025, Dollpimp.com had brought out lines of silicone sex dolls bearing Bacon's likeness. The following month, Bacon was inspired by Bonnie Blue's "1,000 men in a day" challenge to announce a "1,000 bottoms versus one top" event, which went viral in October, following which he justified the challenge as an attempt to raise awareness about safe sex, and Brooks announced a copycat challenge. PinkNews and Attitude expressed doubt that such an event was possible due to men's refractory periods after orgasm. Bacon subsequently co-hosted the 2026 GayVN Awards, and appeared in YouTube's Hot Tub Games. He creates erotic content for his own channels on X (formerly Twitter), where his profile has over 1 million followers, and OnlyFans.

In June 2026, Bacon was arrested after allegedly strangling his partner. He was charged with domestic battery by strangulation and coercion constituting domestic violence with threat or physical force. He also received a misdemeanor domestic battery charge. Later that month, he was arrested for a misdemeanor DUI after getting into a car accident. The following month, Bacon was arrested for possessing a toxic substance similar to Toluene.
