= Rocco Steele =

American gay pornographic actor (born 1964)

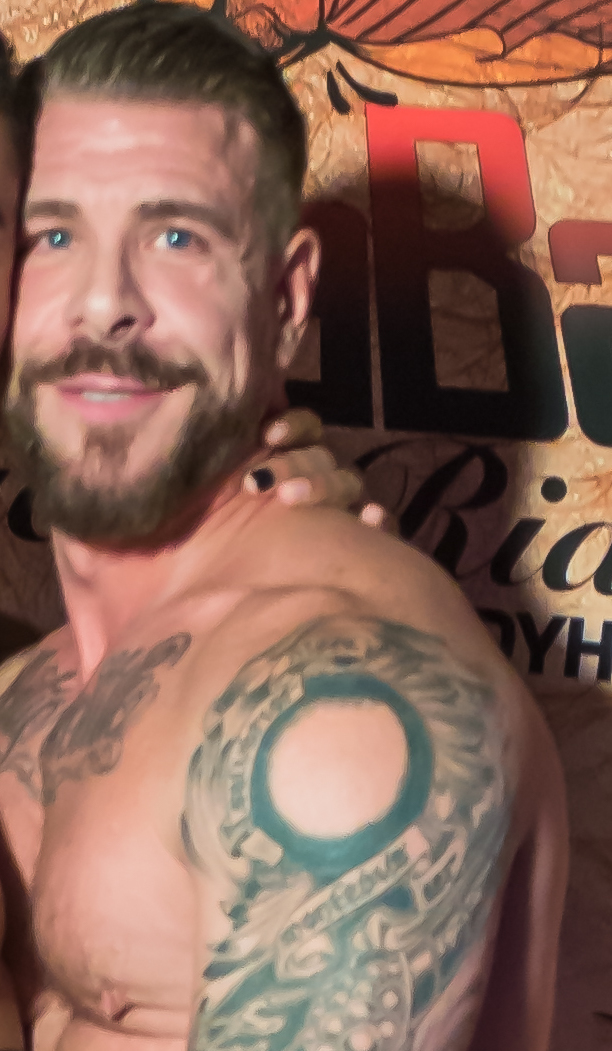
- Steele in 2014
- Born: 1964 (age 61–62); Ohio, U.S.
- Occupations: Pornographic actor; pornographic film director
- Years active: 2014–present

Rocco Steele (born 1964) is an American gay pornographic actor, pornographic film director, and former escort. Steele became an escort in 2012 while in his 40s. He started his pornographic career two years later, and has since been frequently regarded in the media as one of gay pornography's most recognizable and lauded stars, particularly for his large penis, "daddy" image, and entrepreneurship.

Steele's other ventures include a pornographic film production studio, an underwear brand, a line of sex toys, a personal lubricant, and Just Oral, a podcast about sex positivity. He has won two GayVN Awards, one XBIZ Award, six Grabby Awards, one Cybersocket Web Award, and one Prowler Award for his work as a pornographic actor and two International Escort Awards, including the 2015 title of Mr. International Hookie, for his escorting.

== Life and career ==
Steele was born in 1964 in Ohio; his father is Italian and was a restaurant and bar owner. He was raised Catholic and has three sisters. He was the president of his fraternity while in college, where he first started coming out as gay to his close friends before being "out in terms of lifestyle" by age 23 and coming out to his family by age 25. In the early 1990s, Steele was an alcoholic and had a cocaine addiction. During this time, he had received a Juris Doctor degree and moved to New York City to take the bar examination in the hopes of becoming a criminal defense lawyer. However, both his alcohol and drug consumption led to complications and his almost being fired from his job, and he attended his first twelve-step meeting in 1999. As of 2020, he has stated that he has been sober since then. Prior to starting his pornographic career, Steele worked at a corporate job in retail in New York City, which he has said made him depressed.

In 2012, while in his 40s, Steele began working as an escort, using Rentboy to post ads for himself, and was given offers by various gay pornographic studios, which he declined. For his escorting work, he won both the International Escort Award for Best Cock and the title of Mr. International Hookie in 2015. Heeding suggestions from friends, he became a gay pornographic film actor in 2014, when he filmed his first solo scene with gay porn producer Ray Dragon of pornographic production company Dragon Media at his studio in Beacon, New York. Pirated videos of him quickly became popular on free pornographic websites in early 2015. In the spring of 2015, he launched Rocco Steele Studios, a pornographic film production studio. At the 2015 Grabby Awards, he was nominated for the awards for Best Top, Hottest Cock, Best Newcomer, Group Scene, Manly Man, and Fan Favorite. Steele made his pornographic directorial debut in 2015 with the Dragon Media film Urban Legend, which was nominated for two Grabby Awards. By 2016, he was one of the most searched-for gay pornographic actors on Pornhub. In August 2016, he launched an underwear company, 10Seven, which was named after his penis measurements. Originally only selling boxer briefs, the company started selling other kinds of underwear, including briefs and jockstraps, by 2018. In 2016, he won the Grabby Awards for Best Duo, for his film Daddy Issues with Casey Everett, and for Hottest Top, and the XBIZ Award for Gay Performer of the Year.

Steele began uploading pornographic content to subscription service OnlyFans in 2017. He won the Grabby Award for Best Actor for his role in Secrets & Lies at the 2017 Grabby Awards. In July 2017, he launched My 10 Inches, a membership-based website for his bareback videos. After directors Ray Dragon and Joe Gage left Dragon Media, the company signed a deal with Steele for him to direct six films a year in the spring of 2018. In 2018, Steele was the third most searched-for gay pornographic actor on Pornhub. He was nominated for the Pornhub Award for Top Daddy Performer at the 2nd Pornhub Awards in 2019. He won the Squirt.org Fan Favorite Award at the 2019 Grabby Awards in May 2019. In September 2019, Steele fronted the Rocco sex toy line for sex toy company Perfect Fit, which included the Rocco Jack Daddy Stroker, a silicone masturbation sleeve. As the face of Ride BodyWorx, a personal lubricant company, his Ride Rocco lubricant was released in 2020. In January 2020, Steele sold nude photos of himself through direct messages on his Twitter account to raise money to combat wildfires in Australia. Steele won the GayVN Award for Favorite Daddy in 2020 and 2021. He hosts Just Oral, a sex-positive podcast and YouTube series for Ride BodyWorx, the first season of which premiered in March 2021. Its second season premiered in August 2021.

== Public image ==
Steele has been noted for his ten-inch-long penis. He appears exclusively as a top in his pornographic scenes. He was diagnosed with undetectable HIV in 2012 and has frequently spoken about the stigma surrounding it and PReP.

For Fleshbot, Vincent Thrice wrote that he had "taken the gay porn world by storm" in 2014 and that he had "what can only accurately be described as a monster cock". Str8UpGayPorn similarly commented that Steele "rose to gay porn superstar status in 2015". In 2015, Marke Bieschke of Vice wrote that "Steele's cock-rocket to the top has been meteoric, the result of a blast of self-confidence, social media engagement, free porn clips, and a razor-sharp marketing plan" and described him as the "archetypal daddy". In described Steele as a "porn industry legend" and "one of the most – if not the most – recognized gay porn star on the planet". In 2018, Derek de Koff of Queerty called him "one of the top entertainers in gay adult films for the last seven years" due to his "burly dad bod" and "not-for-the-faint-of-heart appendage". Instinct described him as "the daddy of all daddies". For Metrosource, Kevin Perry called Steele "an intrepid entrepreneur who has penetrated pop culture in its many willing orifices". Zachary Zane of Men's Health called Steele a "gay porn megastar", while Mikelle Street of Out described him as "a heavily awarded porn performer".

== Awards and nominations ==
List of awards and nominations, with award, year, category, nominated work, result, and reference shown
Award	Year	Category	Nominee(s)	Result	Ref.
Cybersocket Web Awards	2015	Best Newcomer	Himself	Nominated	
Cybersocket Web Awards	2016	Best Porn Star	Himself	Nominated	
Cybersocket Web Awards	2016	Best Sex Scene	Daddy Issues	Nominated	
Cybersocket Web Awards	2016	Best Sex Scene	Guard Patrol Gang Bang	Nominated	
Cybersocket Web Awards	2017	Best Porn Star	Himself	Nominated	
Cybersocket Web Awards	2017	Best Sex Scene	Deep Examination	Nominated	
Cybersocket Web Awards	2017	Best Sex Scene	Sexperiment Ep. 4: Take My Pretty Hole Daddy	Nominated	
Cybersocket Web Awards	2020	Best Director	Himself	Nominated	
Cybersocket Web Awards	2020	JustForFans Model of the Year	Himself	Nominated	
Cybersocket Web Awards	2022	Daddy of the Year	Himself	Won	
GayVN Awards	2018	Best Group Sex Scene	Kiss and Tel Aviv	Nominated	
GayVN Awards	2018	Favorite Cock	Himself	Nominated	
GayVN Awards	2019	Best Director – Feature	Rocco Steele's Urban Legend 2	Nominated	
GayVN Awards	2019	Best Director – Non-Feature	Rocco Steele's Spring Broke	Nominated	
GayVN Awards	2020	Best Director – Feature	Rocco Steele's Cell Block D	Nominated	
GayVN Awards	2020	Best Group Sex Scene	Rocco Steele's Cell Block D	Nominated	
GayVN Awards	2020	Best Director – Non-Feature	Father and Son Secrets	Nominated	
GayVN Awards	2020	Favorite Daddy	Himself	Won	
GayVN Awards	2021	Best Director – Non-Feature	Dad's Bareback Collision Shop	Nominated	
GayVN Awards	2021	Favorite Daddy	Himself	Won	
GayVN Awards	2022	Best Director – Non-Feature	Rocco Steele's Door Open Ass Up Motel	Nominated	
Grabby Awards	2015	Best Newcomer	Himself	Nominated	
Grabby Awards	2015	Hottest Top	Himself	Nominated	
Grabby Awards	2015	Hottest Cock	Himself	Won	
Grabby Awards	2015	Manly Man	Himself	Nominated	
Grabby Awards	2015	Squirt.org Favorite Porn Star	Himself	Won	
Grabby Awards	2015	Best Group	Guard Patrol	Won	
Grabby Awards	2016	Best Actor	Daddy Issues	Nominated	
Grabby Awards	2016	Best Duo	Daddy Issues	Won	
Grabby Awards	2016	Best Duo	Urban Legend	Nominated	
Grabby Awards	2016	Best Group	Urban Legend	Nominated	
Grabby Awards	2016	Hottest Top	Himself	Nominated	
Grabby Awards	2016	Hottest Cock	Himself	Nominated	
Grabby Awards	2016	Manly Man	Himself	Nominated	
Grabby Awards	2016	Performer of the Year	Himself	Nominated	
Grabby Awards	2016	Web Performer of the Year	Himself	Nominated	
Grabby Awards	2017	Best Actor	Secrets & Lies	Won	
Grabby Awards	2017	Hottest Top	Himself	Nominated	
Grabby Awards	2017	Hottest Cock	Himself	Nominated	
Grabby Awards	2017	Manly Man	Himself	Nominated	
Grabby Awards	2017	Performer of the Year	Himself	Nominated	
Grabby Awards	2017	Hottest Rimming	Sexperiment	Nominated	
Grabby Awards	2017	Squirt.org Fan Favorite Porn Star	Himself	Nominated	
Grabby Awards	2018	Hottest Top	Himself	Nominated	
Grabby Awards	2018	Hottest Cock	Himself	Nominated	
Grabby Awards	2018	Best Threeway	Daddy We've Been Bad	Nominated	
Grabby Awards	2018	Squirt.org Fan Favorite Porn Star	Himself	Won	
Grabby Awards	2019	Hottest Top	Himself	Nominated	
Grabby Awards	2019	Hottest Cock	Himself	Nominated	
Grabby Awards	2019	Best Director – Movie/Web Series	Rocco Steele's Urban Legend 2	Nominated	
Grabby Awards	2019	Best Director – All Sex	Rocco Steele's Spring Broke	Nominated	
Grabby Awards	2020	Best Supporting Actor	Sexual Favors	Nominated	
Grabby Awards	2021	Hottest Cock	Himself	Nominated	
Grabby Awards	2021	Hottest Top	Himself	Nominated	
Grabby Awards	2021	Hottest Daddy	Himself	Nominated	
Grabby Awards	2021	Best Director – All Sex	—N/a	Nominated	
Grabby Awards	2022	Best Director – All Sex	Rocco Steele's Door Open Ass Up Motel	Nominated	
Pornhub Awards	2020	Most Popular Gay Male Performer	Himself	Nominated	
Pornhub Awards	2020	Top Daddy Performer	Himself	Nominated	
Prowler Awards	2016	Best International Porn Star	Himself	Nominated	
Prowler Awards	2017	Best International Porn Star	Himself	Won	
Prowler Awards	2018	Best International Porn Star	Himself	Nominated	
Prowler Awards	2019	Best International Porn Star	Himself	Nominated	
Prowler Awards	2020	Best International Porn Star	Himself	Nominated	
XBIZ Awards	2016	Gay Performer of the Year	Himself	Won	
