= Sister Roma =

American drag queen and activist (born 1962)

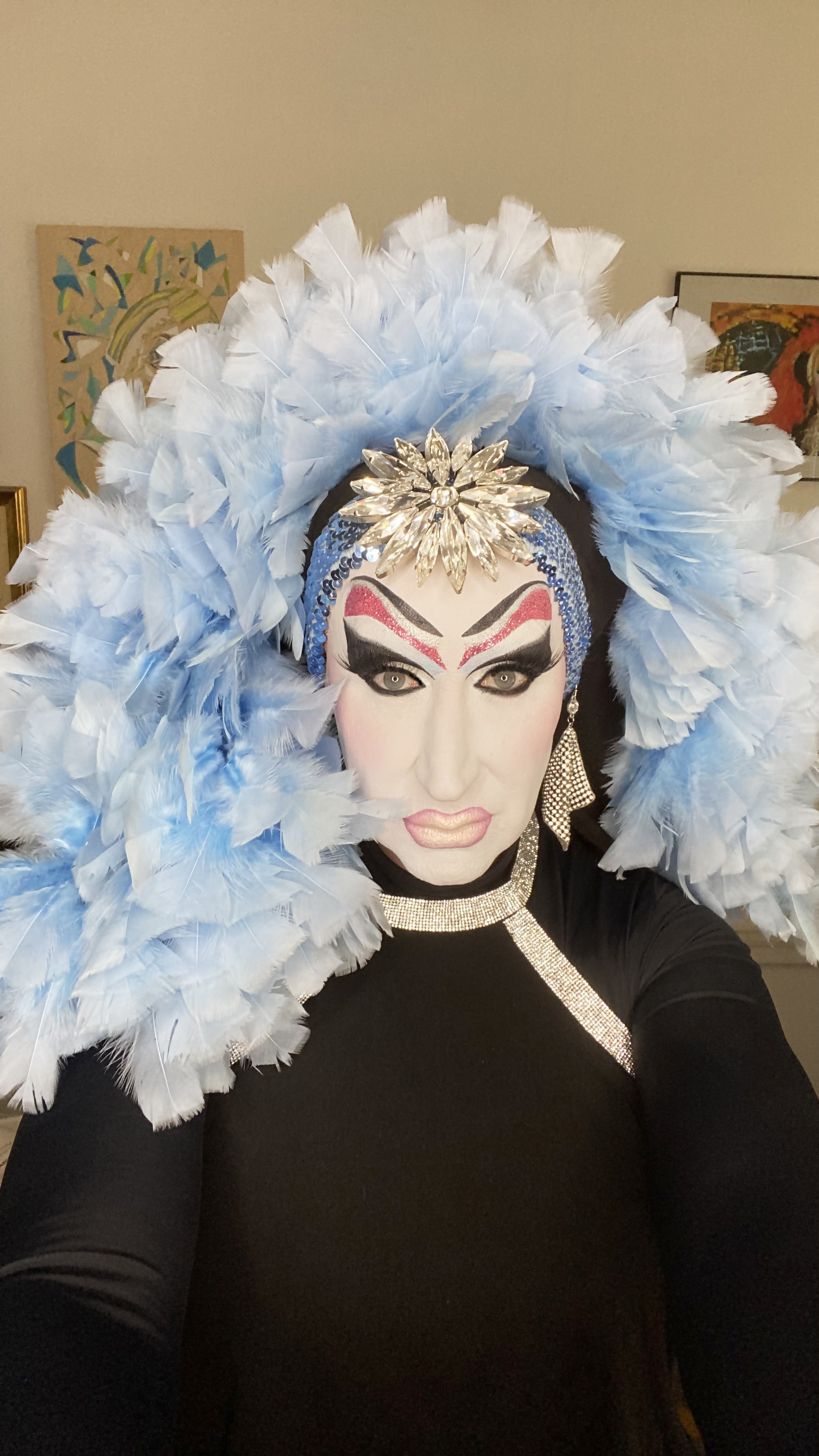
- Sister Roma in 2021
- Born: Michael Williams; December 22, 1962 (age 63); Michigan

Michael Williams (born December 22, 1962), known professionally as Sister Roma, is an American drag queen, activist and actress. She is a prominent member of the San Francisco-based Sisters of Perpetual Indulgence.

== Career ==
Roma was the long-time art director at gay pornography studio Hot House Entertainment until Hot House was bought by NakedSword, in 2014; he now serves as "art director and overall Ambassador of NakedSword". Roma also co-hosts an online talk show, The Tim and Roma Show, that focuses on gay pornographic movies and the LGBT community. Roma has been a presenter at the GayVN Awards, a pornography industry awards show. Roma has served as an emcee and judge for the San Francisco Drag King Contest, the 2005 benefit Porn Idol; and at the BDSM/leather event the Folsom Street Fair. For the 24th annual Folsom Street Fair, held September 30, 2007, the official poster artwork was a controversial photo featuring well-known LGBT and BDSM community members in festive and fetish attire including Roma "as players in an innovative version of the culturally iconographic" The Last Supper by Leonardo da Vinci, complete with table draped with the Leather Pride flag and "cluttered with sex toys, whips, and various (BDSM) restraints". The image by FredAlert was used on the official event guide and produced as collector's posters that were displayed throughout the city as advertising for the event.

In 2003, Roma's drag act was incorporated into Ronnie Larsen's play Sleeping with Straight Men with Mink Stole in San Francisco. In 2006, Roma was nominated for Best Nonsexual Performance Gay Adult Video News (GAYVN) award for her portrayal of Mona Lott, the maid of Wet Palms, which is a ten-episode gay-porn soap opera series. He also has performed at San Francisco's long-running drag show Trannyshack. In 2012, Sister Roma was the sole community-elected grand marshal, serving with twelve other marshals appointed by the Pride Board of the San Francisco Pride Parade. In 2014, Roma objected to Facebook's real-name policy after the site suspended multiple accounts belonging to LGBT entertainers, and was one of a group of San Francisco residents who met with Facebook representatives to discuss the policy.

== Awards and nominations ==
Year	Award	Category	Result
2006	GayVN Awards	Best Nonsexual Performance (Wet Palms)	Nominated
2010	GayVN Awards	Personality of the Year	Won
2012	San Francisco Pride	Community Grand Marshal	Won
