= Malik Delgaty =

Canadian gay pornographic film actor (born 2000)

- Born: Justin Lesage; September 29, 2000 (age 26); Montreal, Quebec, Canada
- Occupation: Pornographic film actor
- Years active: 2020–present
- Height: 6 ft 3 in (191 cm)
- Website: malikdelgaty.com

Justin Lesage (born 29 September 2000), known professionally as Malik Delgaty, is a Canadian actor in gay pornographic films. He began working as a stripper at 18 years old in his hometown of Montreal before signing an exclusive contract with Men.com in 2020. He was the most searched-for gay pornographic actor online from 2022 to 2024 and has won three GayVN Awards.

== Early life ==
Justin Lesage was born on September 29, 2000 in Montreal, Quebec, and is of French Canadian descent. He has one sister. His father, who had worked as a stripper at the Montreal male strip club Campus starting in 1998, was addicted to cocaine and was absent from much of his childhood due to being in prison. Delgaty has stated that he often got into fights and was bullied at school, partly due to his timidity, and transferred schools multiple times as a result. His mother soon enrolled him in judo, which he practiced for 10 years and won several championships in. At 14 years old, he began working for his uncle, Andre, in construction. At 17, according to him, his mother's partner physically and sexually abused her, prompting him to move out of her house and to move in with his cousin, Caroline, outside of Montreal.

== Career ==
One week after his 18th birthday, Delgaty began working as a stripper at Campus at the recommendation of his friend, who worked as a bartender there. According to him, he became a fan favorite at the club. He turned down multiple offers from gay pornographic studios until 2020, when he signed an exclusive contract with Men.com and was promoted as the company's "new face". Delgaty made his debut in bisexual pornography for WhyNotBi in the scene Bussy Swap, which was released in March 2022, and as a bottom in Top to Bottom: Malik Delgaty, released in November of that year. In 2025, he won the GayVN Award for Favorite Dom and the XMA Creator Award for Boy/Boy Collab Clip of the Year.

In February 2021, Delgaty starred in an ad campaign for Dsquared2's Stripped2 underwear collection, in which he played a stripper. He appeared on the cover of DNA for their annual "Sexiest Men Alive" issue in August 2021.

== Public image ==
In 2021, Queer Me Now called him "among the most popular models at Men.com at the moment". Marcus Wratten of PinkNews described him as one of Men.com's "best-known faces" in 2024, while Ness Miller of XBIZ called him ""America's favorite straight gay porn star". According to Str8UpGayPorn, Delgaty was the most searched-for gay porn star in 2022 based on Google Analytics and their internal data, while Pornhub listed him as their most searched-for gay porn star in both 2023 and 2024.

== Personal life ==
Delgaty identifies as straight and has stated that he "had never been attracted to men before being on camera". He has been described as "gay-for-pay".

Delgaty has described his mother as initially disapproving of his career in gay pornography, calling it "worse than [being] gay" as he was doing it for monetary gain and plunging her into a monthslong depression. He was involved in a car accident in 2022 which broke his neck. Outside of pornography, he owns an asphalt company and is an investor in a Canadian marijuana farm.

== Awards and nominations ==
Year	Award	Nomination	Work	Result	Ref.
2022	GayVN Awards	Best Newcomer		Nominated	
2023	GayVN Awards	Favorite Top		Won	
2023	GayVN Awards	Best Bi Sex Scene	CineCum, WhyNotBi.com	Won	
2023	XBIZ Award	Gay Performer of the Year		Nominated	
2025	GayVN Awards	Favorite Dom		Won	
