= Moan (film) =

- DVD released by Vivid Man
- Directed by: David Thompson
- Screenplay by: Alex Nixx
- Based on: Scream by Kevin Williamson
- Produced by: Toni Brooks
- Starring: Ethan Marc; Tommy Lord; Doug Jeffries; Blake Harper; Jason Branch; Tom Southern; Chad Donovan
- Edited by: Prince Wudz
- Production company: Vivid Man
- Distributed by: Vivid Man
- Release date: June 1999 (United States)
- Running time: 70 minutes
- Country: United States
- Language: English

Moan is a 1999 gay pornographic horror film directed by David Thompson, and written by Alex Nixx. It is based on the 1996 film Scream by Wes Craven and Kevin Williamson.

== Plot ==
While making popcorn, Kenny is called by an unknown person, who flirts with him. The conversation turns disturbing, and ends when a man wearing a hood and face paint breaks into Kenny's house, and rapes him. The next day, Kenny's friends discuss what happened to him, revealing that he was so traumatized from being raped that he has suffered a mental breakdown. Investigating the attack is Deputy Derek, who questions Kenny's friends, all of whom have reasonable alibis. Derek then has sex with Ricky, and afterward Ricky mentions that Kenny had recently dumped Stuart.

After Derek leaves, dismissing a nosy reporter on his way out, Sam chats with Tom, and brings up Chris, his boyfriend who had been raped and murdered almost a year ago, supposedly by a man named Steve Warner. Sam goes home, and after masturbating he is taunted over the phone by Kenny's rapist, who then attacks him. Sam fights off his assailant, and accuses Brian of being him, as he showed up right after the attack, cellular phone in hand. Brian is arrested by Derek, but is released the next day, due to a lack of evidence, and Sam getting another call from the rapist.

Despite all that has happened, everyone attends a party being held at Stuart's house. Tom goes to get beer and light bulbs out of the garage, where he is confronted by and has sex with the rapist, who drowns him in a hot tub afterward. Ricky goes to look for Tom, and is locked in the garage by the rapist, revealed to be Brian, who is working with Stuart. Brian murdered Chris and framed his boyfriend Steve for it because Chris and Steve were having an affair, and now he and Stuart are going to kill Sam, after forcing him to participate in a threesome, as "no porno is complete without a good threeway". When the trio ejaculates, Derek and the reporter enter, and arrest Brian and Stuart, the reporter having recorded the two bragging about their crimes from outside.

== Cast ==
- Chad Donovan as Stuart
- Tommy Lord as Kenny Beeker
- Ethan Marc as Brian
- Blake Harper as Sam
- Jason Branch as Tom
- Doug Jeffries as Ricky
- Tom Southern as Deputy Derek
- Paul Dawson as Gary

== Reception ==
Jeremy Spencer of GayVN gave Moan a 3½ out of 5, criticizing the editing and direction, but still calling it "a fast-paced sexual romp that is both hysterical and creepy" with a cast composed of "powerhouse sexual performers and some decent actors". A score of 3/4 was given to the film by the Gay Erotic Video Index, which wrote, "It's a funny, campy spoof that is loaded with hot sex, over-the-top performances and a spattering of technical snafus". The film won Best Sex Comedy at the 2000 GayVN Awards.
