= GayVN Awards =

Gay adult entertainment industry award

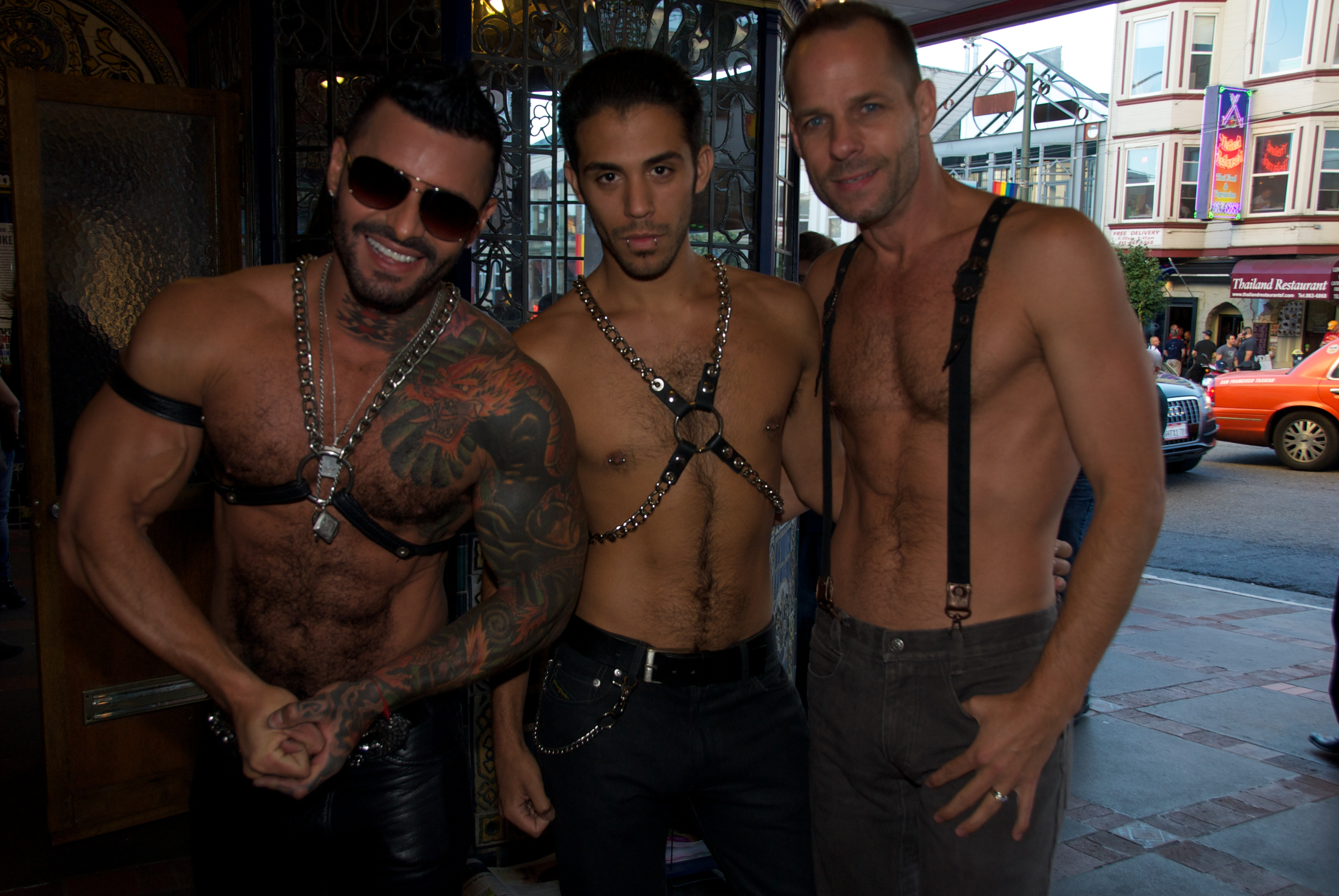
- Alexsander Freitas (left) and Michael Brandon (right) at GayVN Awards 2010
- Sponsored by: AVN Magazine
- Location: Las Vegas, Nevada, U.S.
- Country: United States
- Hosted by: Alec Mapa
- Reward: Trophy
- First award: 1998; 28 years ago

Highlights
- Most awards: Michael Lucas' La Dolce Vita
- Website: avn.com/gayvnawards

The GayVN Awards are film awards presented annually to honor work done in the gay pornographic industry. The awards were sponsored by AVN Magazine, the parent publication of GAYVN Magazine, and continue the recognition for gay pornography which was part of the AVN Awards from 1986–1998. The awards went on a hiatus after the 2011 ceremony and returned in 2018.

The award recipients are listed below by the year of the award ceremony. In 1998, the first year of the awards, awards were given for that current year's work. Starting with the awards show held in 2000, the awards were given for the previous year's work. For example, the 8th GAYVN Awards were held on March 9, 2006; awards were given for the movies that were released in 2005. The awards have been held annually since 2000. The current record-holder for the most wins in one year is Lucas Entertainment's Michael Lucas' La Dolce Vita (2006), which won 14 awards in 2007. The previous record-holder with 11 award wins in 2005 was Buckshot Productions' BuckleRoos.

== 1998 ==
Winners from the 1998 GayVN Awards held December 4, 1998, at the Westin Bonaventure, Los Angeles, California, as published in Choices: The 1999 AVN Awards Show official program:

Best Actor—Gay Video
Vince Rockland, Three Brothers, New Age Pictures
Best All-Sex Gay Video
Link 2 Link, All Worlds Video
Best Art Direction—Gay Video
Thunder Balls, Fox Studios
Best Bisexual Video
Curious?, Vivid Raw
Best Box Cover Concept—Gay Video
Time Cops, Centaur Films
Best Director—Bisexual Video
Anthony Rose, Curious?, Vivid Raw
Best Director—Gay Video (tie)
Kristen Bjorn, Man Watcher, Kristen Bjorn
Sam Slam & Gino Colbert, Three Brothers, New Age Pictures
Best Editing—Gay Video
Fallen Angel 2, Tab Lloyd, Titan Media
Best Ethnic-Themed Gay Video
Hot Times in Little Havana, Kristen Bjorn
Best Foreign Release—Gay Video
Impromptus, All Worlds Video
Best Gay Alternative Release
Arousal, Titan Media
Best Gay Solo Video
Alex and His Buddies, Marcostudio
Best Gay Specialty Release
Fetish Sex Fights 1 & 2, Can-Am Productions
Best Gay Video
Man Watcher, Kristen Bjorn
Best Gay/Bi Amateur Tape
Blade's Real World, Video 10
Best Group Sex Scene—Gay Video
Ryker's Revenge, Zachery Scott, Brett Ford, Tony Donovan & Chad Donovan, Men of Odyssey
Best Leather Video
Fallen Angel 2, Titan Media

Best Music—Gay or Bi Video
Thunder Balls, Bronski Beat & Ram Fist, Thor Productions
Best Non-Sex Performance—Gay/Bi Video
Lana Luster, Thunder Balls, Fox Studios
Best Newcomer—Gay Video
Joey Hart
Best Overall Marketing Campaign—Gay Video
Ryker's Revenge, Men of Odyssey
Best Packaging—Gay Video
Billy 2000, Studio 2000
Best Renting Tape of the Year—Gay Video
Man Watcher, Kristen Bjorn
Best Screenplay—Gay Video
Gino Colbert and Sam Slam, Three Brothers, New Age Pictures
Best Selling Tape of the Year—Gay Video
An American in Prague, BelAmi
Best Sex Comedy—Gay Video
Thunder Balls, Fox Studios
Best Sex Scene—Gay Video
California Kings, Mike Branson & Tom Chase, Falcon Entertainment
Best Supporting Actor—Gay Video
Cole Tucker, Catalinaville, Catalina Video
Best Videography—Gay Video
Man Watcher, Kristen Bjorn
Favorite Makeup Artist (Industry-Voted Award)
Mr. Ed
Favorite Still Photographer (Industry-Voted Award)
Greg Lenzman
Gay Performer of the Year
Cole Tucker
The Safe Sex Award—Gay Video
Red, Hot & Safe, No Egos Productions

[Top]

== 1999 ==
Starting in 2000, awards would be given for the previous year's achievement. Therefore, the awards recognizing achievement in 1999 would be given at the award ceremony in 2000; there was no award ceremony in 1999.

== 2000 ==
Best Actor
Blake Harper, Animus, All Worlds Video
Best All-Sex Video
Absolute: Arid, Falcon Entertainment
Best Alternative Video
The O Boys: Parties, Porn & Politics, O Boys Productions
Best Amateur Video
New Meat 11, Allan Alan Pictures
Best Art Direction
Sodom, Vivid Man
Best Bisexual Video
Mass Appeal, Men of Odyssey
Best Director
Dream Team, Studio 2000
Best Editing
The Final Link, All Worlds Video
Best Ethnic-Themed Video
Latin Knockout, Brush Creek Media
Best Foreign Release
BelAmi
Best Gay Video
Dream Team, Studio 2000
Best Group Scene—tie
Betrayed, Falcon Studios
Thick As Thieves, Opening Orgy, Sarava Productions
Best Leather Video
The Final Link, All Worlds Video
Best Music
Wet Dreams, Sarava Productions
Best Newcomer
Spike

Best Oral Scene
Ass Lick Alley, All Worlds Video
Best Overall Marketing Campaign
Mass Appeal, Men of Odyssey
Best Packaging
Technical Ecstasy, Men of Odyssey
Best Screenplay
Dream Team, Studio 2000
Best Sex Comedy
Moan, Vivid Man
Best Sex Scene
Technical Ecstasy, Men of Odyssey
Best Solo Performance
Joe's Big Adventure, Jaguar Productions
Best Solo Video
Man Trade Solos, Sports & Recreation Video
Best Specialty Release
Hellrazer 3, Talos Entertainment
Best Supporting Actor
Animus, All Worlds Video
Best Threesome
Animus, All Worlds Video
Best Videography
Absolute: Aqua, Falcon Studios
Best Make-up Artist
Best Still Photographer
Best Renting Tape of the Year
101 Men 3 & 4, Bel Ami
Gay Performer of the Year
Special Achievement Award for AIDS Causes
The Lifetime Achievement Award
Hall of Fame

[Top]

== 2001 ==
Best Actor
Tony Donovan, Men of Odyssey
Best All-Sex Video
Heat, Titan Media
Best Alternative Video
Sarava Productions
Best Amateur Video
First Time Tryers 18, All Worlds Video
Best Art Direction
The Servant, Stable Entertainment
Best Bisexual Video
Goosed Again!, Stable Entertainment
Best Director—tie
Echoes, Men of Odyssey
Out of Athens, Falcon Entertainment
Best Director—Bisexual Director
Anthony Rose, Goosed Again!, Stable Entertainment
Best Editing
Top Secret, Andrew Rosen, Men of Odyssey
Best Ethnic-Themed Video
Caesar's Hardhat Gang Bang, Men of Odyssey
Best Foreign Video
Italian Style, Sarava Productions
Best Gay Video
Echoes, Men of Odyssey
Best Group Scene
Out of Athens, Falcon Studios
Best Leather Video
Bad Behavior, Falcon Studios
Best Make-up Artist
Mistress Mona
Best Music
Echoes, Men of Odyssey
Best Newcomer
Best Non-Sex Performance
Echoes, Men of Odyssey

Best Oral Scene
Don't Ask, Don't Tell, MSR Videos
Best Overall Marketing Campaign
Top Secret, Men of Odyssey
Best Packaging
Jacked to Vegas, Rascal Video
Best Renting Tape of the Year
Wet Dreams 1 & 2, Sarava Productions
Best Screenplay
Now and Forever, Studio 2000
Best Sex Comedy
Devil is a Bottom, All Worlds Video
Best Sex Scene
Colby Taylor The Crush, Falcon Studios
Best Solo Performance
Fire Island Cruising, Lucas Entertainment
Best Solo Video
101 Men 6, BelAmi
Best Specialty Release
Hand Over Fist, Club Inferno/Hot House Entertainment
Best Still Photographer
Greg Lenzman
Best Supporting Actor
Travis Wade, The Crush, Falcon Studios
Best Threesome
Adam Bristol, A Young Man's World, Delta Productions
Best Videography
Out of Athens, Falcon Studios
Gay Performer of the Year
Hall of Fame
Performer Special Achievement Award for AIDS Causes

[Top]

== 2002 ==
Best Actor—tie
Tony Donovan, Carnal Intentions, Men of Odyssey
Zak Spears, The Joint, Men of Odyssey
Best All-Sex Video
Sea Men: Fallen Angel 4, Titan Media
Best Alternative Release
The House of Morecock, 10% Productions / Adult Visual Animation
Best Amateur Video
Personal Trainers 2, BelAmi
Best Art Direction
Sea Men: Fallen Angel 4, Titan Media
Best Bisexual Video
Goosed for 3!: A Bisexual Love Affair, Stable Entertainment
Best Classic Gay DVD
The Other Side of Aspen, Falcon Entertainment
Best Director
Wash West, Seven Deadly Sins: Gluttony, All Worlds Video
Best Director—Bisexual Video
Chi Chi LaRue, Mile Bi Club, All Worlds Video
Best Editing
Seven Deadly Sins: Gluttony, All Worlds Video
Best Ethnic-Themed Video
Top to Bottom, Lucas Entertainment
Best Foreign release
Moscow: The Power of Submission, Sarava Productions
Best Gay DVD
Sea Men: Fallen Angel 4: Hardcore Collector's Edition, Titan Media
Best Gay DVD Extras
Sea Men: Fallen Angel 4: Hardcore Collector's Edition, Titan Media
Best Gay Video
Seven Deadly Sins: Gluttony, All Worlds Video
Best Group Scene
The Other Side of Aspen 5, Living Room Orgy, Falcon Studios
Best Leather Video
Shock, Falcon Entertainment
Best Music—Gay or Bi
The Back Row, Rascal Video
Best Newcomer
Matthew Rush
Best Non-sex Performance—Gay or Bi
Sharon Kane, Cracked, Catalina Video

Best Oral Scene
The Joint, Shower Scene, Men of Odyssey
Best Overall Marketing Campaign
The Back Row, Rascal Video
Best Packaging
The Back Row, 1972 & 2001, Rascal Video
Best Screenplay
Seven Deadly Sins: Gluttony, All Worlds Video
Best Sex Comedy
A Dream Come True, Rad Video
Best Sex Scene
Sea Men: Fallen Angel 4, Adriano Marquez and Dred Scott, Titan Media
Best Solo Performance
Tuck Johnson, Goosed for 3!: A Bisexual Love Affair, Stable Entertainment
Best Solo Video
Alone with ... 1, Falcon Studios
Best Specialty release
Slap Happy, Global Warming Video
Best Supporting Actor
Kevin Kramer, Going Down & Cumming Out in Beverly Hills, Great Dane Productions
Best Threesome
Vengeance, Chad Hunt, Erik Martins, Carlos Morales, Lucas Entertainment
Best Videography
Seven Deadly Sins: Gluttony, All Worlds Video
Gay Performer of the Year
Michael Brandon
Hall of Fame Inductees
Jim Bentley
Josh Eliot
Chad Johnson
John Rutherford
Ken Ryker
Steven Scarborough
Jim Steel
Performer Special Achievement Award for AIDS Causes
Shawn Islander
Best Renting Tape of the Year
Coverboys, Bel Ami

[Top]

== 2003 ==
Host: Taylor Negron

Best Actor—tie
Caesar, Cowboy, Big Blue Productions
Josh Weston, Deep South: The Big and the Easy, Falcon Entertainment
Best All-Sex Video
Dreamers, Sarava Productions
Best Alternative Release
The Fluffer, TLA Releasing
Best Amateur Video
Hand Picked 2, Rascal Video/Channel 1 Releasing
Best Art Direction
White Trash, MSR Videos
Best Bisexual Video
Mass Appeal 2, Men of Odyssey
Best Classic Gay DVD
The Wakefield Poole Collection, Mercury Releasing / TLA Releasing
Best Director
Chi Chi LaRue and John Rutherford, Deep South: The Big and the Easy, Falcon Studios
Best Director—Bisexual Video
Jim Steel, Mass Appeal 2, Men of Odyssey
Best Editing
Joe Anjou, White Trash, MSR Videos
Best Ethnic-Themed Video
Zoot Suit, All Worlds Video
Best Foreign Release
Spanish Uprising, Studio 2000 International
Best Gay DVD
Absolute: Aqua/Arid, Falcon Studios
Best Gay DVD Extras
The Back Row, Rascal Video/Channel 1 Releasing
Best Gay Video
Deep South: The Big and the Easy, Falcon Studios
Best Group Scene
Deep South: The Big and the Easy, Derek Cameron, Sebastian Cole, Chad Hunt, Jeremy Jordan, Clay Maverick, Jason Tyler, Adam Wolfe, Falcon Studios
Best Leather Video
Prowl 3, MSR Videos
Best Music
Gian Franco, White Trash, MSR Videos

Best Newcomer
Bret Wolfe
Best Oral Scene
Oral Exams, Chris Bolt, Ray Stone, Rascal Video/Channel 1 Releasing
Best Overall Marketing Campaign
White Trash, MSR Videos
Best Packaging
White Trash, MSR Videos
Best Renting Tape of the Year
Finish Me Off, Rascal Video/Channel 1 Releasing
Best Screenplay
Rick Tugger, White Trash, MSR Videos
Best Sex Comedy
White Trash, MSR Videos
Best Sex Scene
Cops Gone Bad!, Michael Soldier and Chris Steele, Raging Stallion Studios
Best Solo Performance
Sean Storm, Open Trench 2: Fuck Fantasies, Sports & Recreation Video
Best Solo Video
Alone With... 3, Falcon Studios
Best Specialty Release
Oral Exams, Rascal Video/Channel 1 Releasing
Best Specialty Release, 18-to-23 Video
The Scout Club, Studio 2000
Best Supporting Actor
Rod Barry, White Trash, MSR Videos
Best Threesome
Deep South: The Big and the Easy Falcon Studios
Best Videography
Todd Montgomery and Max Phillips, Deep South: The Big and the Easy, Falcon Studios
Gay Performer of the Year—tie
Michael Brandon
Colton Ford
GayVN Hall of Fame Inductees
Chip Daniels
Wakefield Poole
Toby Ross
J.D. Slater

[Top]

== 2004 ==
Best Actor
Michael Soldier, A Porn Star Is Born, Raging Stallion Studios
Best All-Sex Video—tie
Bone Island, Sarava Productions
Gorge, Titan Media
Best Alternative Video
The Agony of Ecstasy, Sarava Productions
Best Amateur Video
Mykonos: LKP Casting 03, Lucas Kazan Productions
Best Art Direction
Carny, Titan Media
Best Bisexual Video
Bisexual Houseguest, Over There / Male Media One
Best Classic DVD
The Other Side of Aspen 2, Falcon Entertainment
Best Director
Wash West, The Hole, Jet Set Productions
Best Director—Bisexual

All Worlds Video

Best DVD
Just For Fun, BelAmi
Best DVD Extras
Carny, Titan Media
Best Editing
'Andrew Rosen, The Hole, Jet Set Productions
Best Ethnic-Themed Video
Sins of the Father, All Worlds Video
Best Foreign Release
Legionnaires, Oh Man! International
Best Group Scene
Detention, Johnny Hazzard, Matt Summers, Logan Reed, Chad Hunt, Matt Majors, Andy Hunter, Mike Johnson, Rascal Video /Channel 1 Releasing
Best Leather Video
Skuff 2, Hot House Entertainment
Best Music
Gian Franco, There Goes the Neighborhood, All Worlds Video
Best Newcomer
Jason Ridge

Best Non-Sex Performance
There Goes the Neighborhood, All Worlds Video
Best Oral Scene
Brad Patton Drenched 1, Falcon Studios
Best Overall Marketing Campaign
The Hole, Jet Set Productions
Best Packaging
Carny, Titan Media
Performer of the Year
Joe Foster
Best Renting Tape
Reload, COLT Studio
Best Screenplay
Rick Tugger, There Goes the Neighborhood, All Worlds Video
Best Sex Comedy
There Goes the Neighborhood, All Worlds Video
Best Sex Scene
Tag Adams, Chad Hunt, Detention, Rascal Video/Channel 1 Releasing
Best Solo Performance
Tag Eriksson, The Hole, Jet Set Productions
Best Solo Video
Boywatch 4, Bel Ami
Best Specialty Release
Mo' Bubble Butt, Hot House Entertainment
Best Specialty Release—18-23
American Way 3: Love, Rad Video
Best Supporting Actor
Dylan Vox, There Goes the Neighborhood, All Worlds Video
Best Threesome
Raging Stallion Studios
Best Video
The Hole, Jet Set Productions
Hall of Fame
Tom Chase
Todd Montgomery
Russell Moore

[Top]

== 2005 ==
Best Actor
Dean Phoenix, BuckleRoos 1-2, Buckshot Productions
Best Actor—Foreign Release
Tim Hamilton, Greek Holiday 1-2, BelAmi
Best All-Sex Video
Bolt, Rascal Video
Best Alternative Release
Tom Bianchi: On the Couch 1-2, Mercury Releasing
Best Amateur Video
ThunderBobby 1, ThunderBobby Productions
Best Art Direction
Horse: Fallen Angel 5, Titan Media
Best Bisexual Video
Semper Bi, All Worlds Video
Best Classic DVD—tie
Sex Bazaar, YMAC
Spokes, Falcon Entertainment
Best Director
John Rutherford and Jerry Douglas, BuckleRoos 1-2, Buckshot Productions
Best Director—Bisexual Video
Dirk Yates, Semper Bi, All Worlds Video
Best DVD Extras
Horse: Fallen Angel 5, Titan Media
Best DVD Special Edition
Bolt, Rascal Video
Best Editing
Andrew Rosen, BuckleRoos 1-2, Buckshot Productions
Best Ethnic-Themed Video
Revolucion Sexual, All Worlds Video
Best Foreign Release
Greek Holiday 1-2, Bel Ami
Best Group Scene
Bolt, Final Orgy, Johnny Hazzard, Rod Barry Rascal Video
Best Leather Video
Horse: Fallen Angel 5, Titan Media
Best Marketing Campaign
BuckleRoos 1-2, Buckshot Productions
Best Music
Nicholas Pavkovic, "Rock Hard", BuckleRoos 1-2, Buckshot Productions
Best Newcomer
Eddie Stone

Best Non-Sex Performance
Zak Spears, BuckleRoos 1-2, Buckshot Productions
Best Oral Scene
Wall of Penises—Hard Sex, Raging Stallion Studios
Best Packaging
Horse: Fallen Angel 5, Titan Media
Performer of the Year
Tag Adams
Best PRO/AM Release
Michael Lucas' Auditions 1, Lucas Entertainment
Best Screenplay
Jack Shamama and Michael Stabile, Wet Palms 1-3, Jet Set Productions
Best Sex Comedy
Wet Palms 1-3, Jet Set Productions
Best Sex Scene
Marcus Iron, BuckleRoos 2, Buckshot Productions
Best Solo Performance
Arpad Miklos, Ricky Martinez, BuckleRoos 1, Buckshot Productions
Best Solo Video
Str8 Shots, Rascal Video
Best Specialty Release—tie
Double Delights, Pacific Sun Entertainment
Whiplash, Dragon Media
Best Specialty Release—18–23
Aqua Club, Pacific Sun Entertainment
Best Specialty Release—Bears
From Bear to Bare, All Worlds Video
Best Supporting Actor
Dylan Vox, Freak: Jet Set Direct, Take 1, Jet Set Productions
Best Threesome
Buckshot Productions
Best Videography
Todd Montgomery, BuckleRoos 1-2, Buckshot Productions
Best Picture
BuckleRoos 1-2, Buckshot Production
2005 GAYVN Hall of Fame Inductees
Chad Donovan
Jim French

[Top]

== 2006 ==
Best Actor
Johnny Hazzard, Wrong Side of the Tracks Part One and Part Two, Rascal Video
Best Actor—Foreign Release
Lukas Ridgeston, Lukas in Love, BelAmi
Best All-Sex Video
Heaven to Hell, Falcon Entertainment
Best Alternative Release
Sex/Life in L.A. 2: Cycles of Porn, TLA Releasing
Best Amateur Video
Straight College Men 23, StraightCollegeMen.com
Best Art Direction
Heaven to Hell, Falcon Studios
Best Bisexual Video
Bi Bi American Pie 4, Macho Man Video
Best Classic DVD
That Boy, Gorilla Factory
Best Director
Chi Chi LaRue, Wrong Side of the Tracks Part One and Part Two, Rascal Video
Best DVD Extras/Special Edition
Dangerous Liaisons, Lucas Entertainment
Best Editing
CH, Wrong Side of the Tracks Part One and Part Two, Rascal Video
Best Ethnic-Themed Video
Lights & Darks, Electro Video
Best Ethnic-Themed Video—Latin
Passport to Paradise, Raging Stallion Studios
Best Foreign Release
Lukas in Love, Bel Ami
Best Group Scene
Arabesque, Raging Stallion Studios
Best Leather Video
The Missing, Hot House Entertainment
Best Marketing Campaign
LeatherBound, Buckshot Productions
Best Music
J.D. Slater, Arabesque, Raging Stallion Studios
Best Newcomer
Roman Heart
Best Non-Sex Performance
Joe Gage, Beyond Perfect, Buckshot Productions
Best Oral Scene
Tag Adams, Jason Crew, Jagger, Bang Bang, Falcon Entertainment

Best Packaging
Gale Force: Men's Room 2, Titan Media
Best Pro/Am Release
Michael Lucas' Auditions 4, Lucas Entertainment
Best Renting Title of 2005
Lukas in Love, Bel Ami
Best Screenplay
Tony DiMarco, Dangerous Liaisons, Lucas Entertainment
Best Sex Comedy
Wet Dreamz of Genie, Liquid Dreamz
Best Sex Scene, Duo
Johnny Hazzard & Tyler Riggz
Wrong Side of the Tracks Part One, Rascal Video
Best Solo Performance
Wrong Side of the Tracks Part One, Rascal Video
Best Solo Video
Minuteman 23, COLT Studio
Best Specialty Release
Face Fuckers, Evil Angel
Best Specialty Release—Extreme
Mutiny, Dark Alley Media
Best Specialty Release—18-23
Twink Juice, Helix Studios
Best Specialty Release—Bears
Muscle Bear Motel, Butch Bear
Best Supporting Actor
Kent Larson, Dangerous Liaisons, Lucas Entertainment
Best Threesome
Cobalt, Stretch, Spencer Quest, Cirque Noir, Titan Media
Best Videography
Hue Wilde, Wrong Side of the Tracks Part One and Part Two, Rascal Video
Performer of the Year
Tom Judson
Best Picture—tie
Michael Lucas' Dangerous Liaisons, Lucas Entertainment
Wrong Side of the Tracks Part One and Part Two, Rascal Video
Outstanding Achievement Award
TLA Releasing
2006 GAYVN Hall of Fame Inductees
Jake Andrews
Michael Brandon
Randy Cochran

[Top]

== 2007 ==
Host: Kathy Griffin

Best Actor
Michael Lucas, Michael Lucas' La Dolce Vita, Lucas Entertainment
Best Actor—Foreign Release
Jean Franko, The School for Lovers, Lucas Kazan Productions
Best All-Sex Video
Black-n-Blue, Hot House Entertainment
Best Alternative Release
Gay Sex in the '70s, Wolfe Video
Best Amateur Video
Rear Gunners 2, Active Duty
Best Art Direction
Michael Lucas' La Dolce Vita, Lucas Entertainment
Best Bisexual Video
Bi Back Mountain, All Worlds Video
Best Classic DVD
Nights in Black Leather, Gorilla Factory
Best Director
Michael Lucas Michael Lucas' La Dolce Vita, Lucas Entertainment
Best DVD Extras/Special Edition
Michael Lucas' La Dolce Vita, Lucas Entertainment
Best Editing
Frank Tyler, Michael Lucas' La Dolce Vita, Lucas Entertainment
Best Ethnic-Themed Video
The Show 1-2 Dark Alley Media / Pitbull Productions
Best Ethnic-Themed Video—Latin
Manhattan Raging Stallion Studios
Best Foreign Release
The School for Lovers, Lucas Kazan Productions
Best Group Scene
Spokes 3, Falcon Entertainment — Orgy
Best Leather Video
Black-n-Blue Hot House Entertainment
Best Marketing Campaign
Michael Lucas' La Dolce Vita, Lucas Entertainment
Best Music
Nekked, Michael Lucas' La Dolce Vita, Lucas Entertainment
Best Newcomer
Matt Cole
Best Non-Sex Performance—tie
Paul Barresi, The Velvet Mafia 1-2, Falcon Studios
Savanna Samson, Michael Lucas' La Dolce Vita, Lucas Entertainment
Best Oral Scene
Justice Hot House Entertainment

Best Packaging
Michael Lucas' La Dolce Vita, Lucas Entertainment
Best Pro/Am Release
Lebanon Collin O'Neal/Raging Stallion Studios
Best Renting Title of 2006
Delinquents All Worlds Video
Best Screenplay
Michael Lucas' La Dolce Vita, Lucas Entertainment
Best Sex Comedy
Going Under, Jet Set Productions
Best Sex Scene, Duo
Brad Patton, Brian Hansen, Manly Heat: Quenched Buckshot Productions
Best Solo Performance
Kent North, At Your Service, Hot House Entertainment
Best Solo Video
Minute Man 28, COLT Studio
Best Specialty Release
X Fights UK XXX, BG East
Best Specialty Release—18-23
Out in Africa 2, BelAmi
Best Specialty Release—Bears
Rough & Ready, Pantheon
Best Specialty Release—Extreme
Folsom Filth, Titan Media
Best Supporting Actor
Spencer Quest, Michael Lucas' La Dolce Vita, Lucas Entertainment
Best Threesome
Jason Ridge, Michael Lucas, Derrick Hanson, Michael Lucas' La Dolce Vita, Lucas Entertainment
Best Videography
Michael Lucas' La Dolce Vita, Lucas Entertainment
Performer of the Year
François Sagat
Best Picture
Michael Lucas' La Dolce Vita, Lucas Entertainment
The Lifetime Achievement Award
Steven Toushin
2007 GAYVN Hall of Fame Inductees
Peter Berlin
Ray Dragon
Chase Hunter
Chris Ward

[Top]

== 2008 ==
Host: Derek Hartley & Romaine Patterson Cohost: Lady Bunny

Best Actor
Jake Deckard, GRUNTS, Raging Stallion
Best Actor – Foreign Release
Jean Franko, The Men I Wanted, Lucas Kazan Productions
Best All-Sex Video
Link: The Evolution, All Worlds Video
Best Alternative Release
Naked Boys Singing, TLA Releasing
Best Amateur Video
Edge Series 1, Chaos Men
Best Art Direction
Link: The Evolution, All Worlds Video
Best Bisexual Release
Bi Accident, Devil's Film)
Best Boxcover Concept
Passio, Dark Alley Media
Best Classic Gay DVD
Falcon 35th Anniversary Box Set, Falcon Entertainment
Best Director
Chris Ward
Best DVD Extras/Special Edition
GRUNTS, Raging Stallion
Best Editing
Chris Ward/Ben Leon, GRUNTS, Raging Stallion
Best Ethnic-Themed Video
Tiger's Eiffel Tower: Paris Is Mine!, Pitbull Productions
Best Ethnic-Themed Video (Latin)
Amazonia: Capture and Release, Athletic Model Guild/AMG Brasil
Best Foreign Release
Knockout, Falcon International
Best Group Scene
Steve Cruz, Johnny Hazzard, Matt Majors, Link: The Evolution, All Worlds Video
Best Leather Video
Folsom Leather, Titan Media
Best Makeup Artist
Seth Stone, On Fire!, Jet Set Men
Best Music
Red Shag, Link: The Evolution, All Worlds Video
Best Newcomer
Blake Riley
Best Non-Sexual Performance
The Intern, Lucas Entertainment
Best Overall Marketing Campaign
Link: The Evolution, All Worlds Video
Best Oral Scene
Joey Amis takes on the cast of Mating Season, BelAmi

Best Packaging
Link: The Evolution, All Worlds Video
Best Picture
GRUNTS, Raging Stallion
Best Pro/Am Release
Edinburgh, Collin O'Neal's World of Men
Best Renting Title of 2007
Rough & Ready, Pantheon
Best Screenplay
Jerry Douglas, Brotherhood, Buckshot Productions
Best Sex Comedy
The Intern, Lucas Entertainment
Best Sex Scene – Duo
Ricky Sinz GRUNTS, Raging Stallion
Best Solo Performance
Ricky Sinz, GRUNTS, Raging Stallion
Best Solo Video
Minute Man Solo #29: Built, COLT Studio
Best Specialty Release
Executive Pleasures 1, MenAtPlay
Best Specialty Release (18-23)
Rebel, BelAmi
Best Specialty Release (Bear)
When Bears Attack, Rascal Video
Best Specialty Release (Extreme)
Fear, Titan Media
Best Still Photographer
Kent Taylor/Geof Teague, GRUNTS, Raging Stallion
Best Supporting Actor – Tie
Christian Cruz, The Intern, Lucas Entertainment
Ricky Sinz, GRUNTS, Raging Stallion
Best Threesome
Jesse Santana, Nickolay Petrov, Jason White, Just Add Water, Jet Set Men
Best Videography
Brian Mills and Paul Wilde, FEAR, Titan Media
Performer of the Year
Jake Deckard
Special Achievement Award
Tim Valenti, NakedSword.com
Hall of Fame Inductees
Paul Barresi
Rod Barry
Lucas Kazan
Tiger Tyson

[Top]

== 2009 ==
Host: Janice Dickinson & Margaret Cho Cohost: Alec Mapa

Best Actor
Ricky Sinz, To the Last Man, Raging Stallion Studios
Best Actor – Foreign Release
Ralph Woods, French Kiss, BelAmi
Best All-Sex Video
Breakers, Titan Media
Best Alternative Release
Wrangler: Anatomy of an Icon, TLA Releasing
Best Amateur Site
ChaosMen.com
Best Amateur Video
Edge, Volume 2, ChaosMen.com
Best Art Direction
To The Last Man, Raging Stallion Studios
Best Bear Film
Centurion Muscle 5: Maximus, Centurion Pictures
Best Bear Site
ButchBear.com
Best Bisexual Release
Shifting Gears: A Bisexual Transmission, Channel 1 Releasing
Best Bottom
Brent Corrigan
Best Cinematography
Chris Ward, Ben Leon & Tony Dimarco, To the Last Man, Raging Stallion Studios
Best Classic Gay DVD
Best of the 1970s, Falcon Entertainment
Best Cum-Shot
Barrett Long, XXX Amateur Hour, Vol. 6, Dirty Bird Pictures
Best Director
Chris Ward, Ben Leon & Tony Dimarco, To the Last Man, Raging Stallion Studios
Best DVD Extras
To the Last Man, Raging Stallion Studios
Best DVD Special Edition
To the Last Man 4-disc Edition, Raging Stallion Studios
Best Editing
To the Last Man, Raging Stallion Studios
Best Ethnic-Themed Video
Black Balled 6: Under the Hood, Channel 1 Releasing
Best Ethnic-Themed Video -Latin
Roman's Holiday, Falcon Entertainment
Best Fetish Film
Folsom Prison, Titan Media
Best Fetish Performer
Tober Brandt
Best Foreign Release
Italians and Other Strangers, Lucas Kazan Productions
Best Group Scene
Zack Randall, Pistol Pete, Dallas Reeves, Rocco, Brett M. Hunt, Zackary Pierce, Braxton Bond, Carlos Rio, Sex Hiker, Black Scorpion Entertainment
Best HD Feature
Breakers, Titan Media
Best Leather Film
Verboten 1& 2, Hot House Entertainment
Best Marketing Campaign
Excess, Channel 1 Releasing

Best Music
JD Slater/Nekked, To the Last Man, Raging Stallion Studios
Best Newcomer
Jackson Wild
Best New Web Performer or the Year
Leo Giamani
Best Non-Sexual Performance
Lady Bunny, Brothers' Reunion, Lucas Entertainment
Best Oral Scene
Ricky Sinz & Jackson Wild, To the Last Man, Raging Stallion Studios
Best Packaging
Return to Fire Island, Lucas Entertainment
Best Picture
To the Last Man, Raging Stallion Studios
Best Pro/Am Release
Brent Corrigan's Summit, Dirty Bird Pictures/Prodigy Pictures
Best Screenplay
Tony Dimarco, To the Last Man, Raging Stallion Studios
Best Sex Comedy
Paging Dr. Finger, Hot House Entertainment
Best Sex Scene – Duo
Vinnie D'Angelo & Logan McCree, The Drifter, Raging Stallion Studios
Best Solo Performance
Tommy Ruckus & Jackson Wild, Home Invasion, Titan Media
Best Solo Film
Minute Man Solo 31: Hangin' Out, COLT Studio Group
Best Supporting Actor
Trevor Knight, Endgame, Dirty Bird Pictures & Scott Tanner, To the Last Man, Raging Stallion Studios
Best Threesome
Logan McCree, Ricky Sinz & Scott Tanner, To the Last Man, Raging Stallion Studios
Best Top
Ricky Sinz
Best Twink Film (18-23)
Just the Sex 1 & 2, Dirty Bird Pictures/Prodigy Pictures
Best Twink Site
BelAmi
Best Web Performer of the Year
Leo Giamani
Best Website of the Year
C1R.com
Performer of the Year
Logan McCree
Trailblazer Award
Chi Chi LaRue
Lifetime Achievement Award
Roger Earl
Hall of Fame Inductees
Dink Flamingo
Michael Lucas (director)
TJ Paris
Dean Phoenix
Jack Simmons
Phil St. John
Chris Steele

[Top]

== 2010 ==
Host: Alec Mapa

Best Actor
Logan McCree, The Visitor (Raging Stallion Studios)
Best All-Sex Video
Tropical Adventure (Kristen BjornProductions)
Best Alternative Release
Men In Stockings (Lucas Entertainment)
Best Amateur/Pro-Am Release
Brent Corrigan's Big Easy (Prodigy Productions/Dirty Bird Pictures)
Best Cumshot
Wall Street (Lucas Entertainment)
Best Director (Tie)
CFocus/ReFocus (Raging Stallion Studios)
Dad Takes a Fishing Trip (D/G Mutual Media)
Best Duo Sex Scene
Best Feature Release
Focus/ReFocus (Raging Stallion Studios)
Best Fetish Release
Skuff 4 (Hot House)
Best Group Sex Scene
Cast, Black Balled 7: Jail Slammed (All Worlds Video)
Best HD Feature
Flux (Titan)
Best Marketing—Company Image
BelAmi Entertainment
Best Newcomer
Conner Habib
Best Sex Comedy
Whorrey Potter and the Sorcerer's Balls (Dominic Ford Features)
Best Solo Performance
Adam Killian, Taken: To the Lowest Level (Rascal)
Best Supporting Actor
Steve Cruz, Focus/ReFocus (Raging Stallion Studios)
Best Videography
Ben Leon and Tony Di Marco, Focus/ReFocus (Raging Stallion Studios)
Best Web-to-DVD Release
Summer Recruits (Active Duty)
Best Renting Title
Steven Daigle: XXXposed (Rascal Video)
Best Selling Title
Men of Israel (Lucas Entertainment)

Performer of the Year
Wilfried Knight
Best Affiliate Program
C1R Affiliate Program
Best Blog/Gossip Site
TheSword.com
Best Genre Site
AthleticModelGuild.com (Classic content)
Best Live Webcam/Webshow
Live & Raw (LiveAndRaw.com)
Best Porn Star Site
BrentEverett.com
Best Web-Based Marketing/Promotion
Channel 1 Releasing
Web Performer of the Year
Brent Corrigan
Website of the Year
RandyBlue.com
Best Top
Trevor Knight
Best Bottom
Brent Corrigan
Best Versatile
Matthew Rush
Overall Fan Favorite
Brent Everett
GayVN Personality of the Year
Sister Roma
Trailblazer Award
Sharon Kane
Lifetime Achievement Award
Pat Rocco
Hall of Fame Inductees
Ryan Block
Mike Donner
Bill Marlowe
Matthew Rush
Mickey Skee

[Top]

== 2018 ==
GayVN Awards was held after a hiatus of seven years on January 21, 2018, at Hard Rock Hotel Casino in Las Vegas. It was hosted by Shangela Laquifa Wadley and was held a week before 35th AVN Award at the same location. Awards were presented in 27 categories.

Full list of nominees and winners

Best Actor
Brent Corrigan, Ultra Fan, NakedSword/Falcon
Best All-Sex Movie
Kiss and Tel Aviv, NakedSword/Falcon
Best Bear Scene
Beards, Bulges & Ballsacks, Raging Stallion/Falcon; Daymin Voss, Michael Roman & Fernando Del Rio
Best Director — Feature
Earthbound: Heaven to Hell 2, Falcon Studios; Chi Chi LaRue
Best Director — Non-Feature
Kiss and Tel Aviv, NakedSword/Falcon; mr. Pam
Best Duo Sex Scene
Austin Fucks Clark, GuysInSweatPants.com; Austin Wilde & Clark Parker
Best Feature
One Erection: The Un-Making of a Boy Band, CockyBoys
Best Fetish Scene
Skuff: Rough Trade 1, Hot House/Falcon; Micah Brandt & Austin Wolf
Best Group Sex Scene
Lifeguards: Summer Session, Helix Studios; Kyle Ross, Blake Mitchell, Max Carter, Joey Mills, Tyler Hill & Evan Parker
Best Marketing — Company Image
Men.com
Best Newcomer
Phoenix Fellington
Best Supporting Actor
Colton Grey, Secrets and Lies, NakedSword/Rock Candy
Best Twink Scene — Tie
Boys Night, HelixStudios.net; Blake Mitchell, Logan Cross, Colton James & Sean Ford
Summer Break: Jeff, Roald, Helmut, Marcel Pt 1, BelAmiOnline.com; Jeff Mirren, Helmut Huxley, Roald Ekberg & Marcel Gassion

Performer of the Year
Sean Zevran
Favorite Bear
Colby Jansen
Favorite Body
Blake Mitchell
Favorite Butt
Tyler Hill
Favorite Cam Guy
Blake Mitchell
Favorite Cock
Austin Wilde
Favorite Daddy
Adam Russo
Favorite Industry Blog
Str8UpGayPorn.com
Favorite Membership Site
HelixStudios.net
Favorite Niche Site
Boynapped.com
Favorite Porn Star Website
ColbyKnox.com
Favorite Twink
Joey Mills
Hottest Newcomer
Calvin Banks
Social Media Star
Max Carter

[Top]

== 2019 ==
Awards were presented at The Joint at Hard Rock Hotel and Casino in Las Vegas on January 21, 2019.

2019 GayVN Hall of Fame Inductee

Keith Miller, founder of Helix Studios

Best Actor (Tie)

- Wesley Woods, Zack & Jack Make a Porno, Falcon Studios
- Diego Sans, Pirates: A Gay XXX Parody, Men.com/Pulse

Best All-Sex Movie

Summer Break 2, BelAmi/Pulse

Best Bi Sex Scene

Lance Hart, Pierce Paris & Dahlia Sky; Wanna Fuck My Wife? Gotta Fuck Me Too 11, Devil's Film

Best Director – Feature

Jake Jaxson, All Saints: Chapter 1, CockyBoys

Best Director – Non-Feature

Chi Chi LaRue & Tony Dimarco; Love & Lust in New Orleans, Falcon Studios

Best Duo Sex Scene

Max Konnor & Armond Rizzo; "Big Black Daddy", NoirMale.com

Best Feature

All Saints: Chapter 1, CockyBoys

Best Fetish Sex Scene

JJ Knight & Sean Zevran; Tie Me Up! Dick Me Down!, CockyBoys

Best Group Sex Scene

Josh Ferguson, Corbin Colby, Joey Mills, Caleb Griffith, Cameron Parks, Angel Rivera & Luke Wilder; "Splash", HelixStudios.com

Best Newcomer

Alam Wernik

Best Parody

Pirates: A Gay XXX Parody, Men.com/Pulse

Best Supporting Actor

Bruce Beckham, The Slutty Professor, NakedSword/Falcon

Best Three-Way Sex Scene

Ace Era, Tyler Roberts & Dave Slick; The Slutty Professor, NakedSword/Falcon

Performer of the Year

Wesley Woods

== 2020 ==
Awards were presented at The Joint at Hard Rock Hotel and Casino in Las Vegas on January 21, 2020. The show was hosted by Alec Mapa and Nicole Byer, with performances by King Princess and Alyssa Edwards.

2020 GayVN Hall of Fame inductee

Tim Valenti, NakedSword/Falcon Studios CEO

Best Actor

DeAngelo Jackson, Blended Family, Icon Male/Mile High

Best All-Sex Movie

Love and Lust in Montreal, Falcon Studios

Best Bi Sex Scene

Natalie Mars, Ella Nova, Ricky Larkin & Wesley Woods; Free for All, WhyNotBi.com

Best Director – Feature

Jake Jaxson & RJ Sebastian; Le Garçon Scandaleux, CockyBoys/PinkTV;

Best Director – Non-Feature

Steve Cruz; Outta the Park!, Raging Stallion/Falcon

Best Duo Sex Scene

Ashton Summers & Phoenix Fellington, Fellington's Flip Fuck, HelixStudios.com

Best Feature

Vegas Nights, HelixStudios.com

Best Fetish Sex Scene

Alex Mecum & Michael DelRay; My Brother's Discipline, Kink.com

Best Group Sex Scene

Alam Wernik, Blake Ryder, Jay Dymel, Nic Sahara & Sean Duran; Five Brothers: The Takedown, NakedSword/Falcon

Best Newcomer

Nic Sahara and Alex Riley (tie)

Best Supporting Actor

Dante Colle, At Large, Raging Stallion/Falcon

Best Three-Way Sex Scene

Jack Harrer, Peter Annaud & Marcel Gassion; Offensively Large 4, BelAmi/Pulse

Performer of the Year

Cade Maddox

Docuseries of the Year

Donnie and the boys starring Peter Annaud and Josh Ferguson

=== Fan awards ===
Favorite Bear

Teddy Torres

Favorite Body

Blake Mitchell

Favorite Bottom

Rourke

Favorite Butt

Beaux Banks

Favorite Cam Guy

Callum and Cole (joint page)

Favorite Cock

Calvin Banks

Favorite Daddy

Rocco Steele

Favorite Dom

Austin Wolf

Favorite FTM Star

Billy Vega

Favorite Top

Zilv Gudel

Favorite Twink

Ian Stell

Hottest Newcomer

Rhyheim Shabazz

Social Media Star

Armond Rizzo

== 2021 ==
Awards were presented virtually during a live stream at AVNStars.com on January 18, 2021. The show was hosted by Alec Mapa and Sherry Vine.

Best Actor

Angel Rivera, A Murdered Heart, NakedSword

Best All-Sex Movie

Summer Loves, BelAmi

Best Bi Sex Scene

Maya Bijou, Dante Colle & Kaleb Stryker, The Elevator Goes Both Ways, WhyNotBi.com

Best Director – Feature

Jake Jaxson & RJ Sebastian, Hollywood & Vine, CockyBoys

Best Director – Non-Feature

Steve Cruz, Cake Shop, Raging Stallion

Best Duo Sex Scene

Rhyheim Shabazz & Sean Zevran, Big Dicks Going Deep, CockyBoys

Best Feature

A Murdered Heart, NakedSword

Best Fetish Sex Scene

Dirk Caber, Nate Grimes, Jaxx Thanatos & Kurtis Wolfe, Tom of Finland: Leather Bar Initiation, Men.com

Best Group Sex Scene

Riley Finch, Johnny Hands, Jacob Hansen, Garrett Kinsley, Travis Stevens & Ashton Summers, Inside Helix, Helix Studios

Best Newcomer

Brock Banks

Fan Awards

Hottest Newcomer

Seth Peterson

Favorite Twink

Austin L Young

Social Media Star

Joey Mills

Favorite Cam Guy

Max Konnor

Favorite Camming Couple

Jacob and Harley

Favorite Top

Austin Wolf

Favorite bottom

Devin Franco

Favorite FTM Star

Trip Richards

Favorite Dom

Zilv Gudel

Favorite Cock

Cade Maddox

Favorite Butt

Alam Wernik

Favorite Bear

Teddy Torres

Favorite Daddy

Rocco Steele

Favorite Body

Alex Mecum

GayVN Star of the Year

Camran Mac

== 2022 ==
Awards were presented virtually on January 19, 2022. The show was hosted by Alec Mapa and Jackie Beat.

2022 GayVN Hall of Fame inductee

Howard Andrew, FabScout Entertainment

Performer of the Year

Max Konnor

Best All-Sex Movie

Fuck Me I'm Famous (BelAmi/TLAGay)

Best Bi Sex Scene

Draven Navarro, Joel Someone and Vanessa Vega, My Wife Found Out I'm Bi! (Devil's Film)

Best Director — Feature

Alex Roman, Return to Helix Academy Parts 1 and 2 (Helix Studios)

Best Director — Non-Feature

Steve Cruz and Leo Forte, Born to Porn (Falcon Studios)

Best FTM Star

Noah Way

=== Fan awards ===
Favorite Camming Couple

Pablo and Sebas

Favorite Cock

Cade Maddox

Hottest Newcomer

Felix Fox

== 2023 ==
Awards were at the Resorts World Theatre on January 5, 2023. The show was hosted by Alec Mapa and Kylie Sonique Love.

Best Newcomer
Drew Valentino
Performer of the Year
Roman Todd
Best All-Sex Movie
BelAmi X Sean Cody, BelAmi/Sean Cody
Best Bi Sex Scene
CineCum, WhyNotBi.com; Dante Colle, Malik Delgaty & Haley Reed
Best Director - Feature
Jake Jaxson & RJ Sebastian, Love Happens, CockyBoys
Best Director - Non-Feature
Boomer Banks, Steve Cruz, Leo Forte, Devin Franco & Max Konnor, Men’s Briefs, Falcon
Best Duo Sex Scene
Austin Breeds Leo, GuysinSweatpants.com; Leo Grand & Austin Wilde
Best Feature
Ride or Die: Raw Deal/Hard Time, Raging Stallion
Best Fetish Scene
BelAmi Bukkake, BelAmiOnline.com; Pip Caulfield, Elio Chalamet, Christiano Cruzo, Hans Lagerfeld, Jarrod
Best Group Sex Scene
BelAmi X Sean Cody; Asher, Bart Cuban, Deacon, Jim Durden, Tom Houston, Justin, Manny, Ashton Montana, Ethan O’Pry & Yannis Paluan
Best Leading Actor
Cole Connor, Ride or Die: Raw Deal/Hard Time, Raging Stallion
Best Actor - Featurette
Manuel Skye, Boy Lust 3, MenAtPlay.com
Best Featurette
Under the Neon Sky, CockyBoys.com (Sean Ford & Leo Louis)
Best Supporting Actor
Max Konnor, Ride or Die: Raw Deal/Hard Time, Raging Stallion
Best Three-Way Sex Scene
How to Build a Perfect Threesome, HelixStudios.com; Reese Jackson, Garrett Kinsley & Kai Taylor

=== Fan awards ===
Favorite All-Male Creator Collab
Christian Styles & Chris Damned
Favorite Cock
Cade Maddox
Favorite Body
Austin Wolf
Favorite Daddy
LeGrand Wolf
Favorite Dom
Chris Damned
Favorite Creator Site Star
Austin Wolf
Favorite Camming Couple
Colby Chambers & Mickey Knox
Favorite Top
Malik Delgaty
Favorite Bear
Adam Russo
Favorite Bottom
Beau Butler
Favorite Twink
Joey Mills
Favorite Porn Star Creator
Cade Maddox
Favorite Butt
Michael Boston
Favorite Cam Guy
Johnny Rapid
Favorite Versatile
Roman Todd
Favorite Newcomer
Drew Valentino
Favorite FTM Star
Austin Spears
GayVN Hall of Fame Inductees
Sister Roma

== 2024 ==
Awards were at the Resorts World Theatre on January 25, 2024. The show was hosted by Alec Mapa and Cade Maddox.

Best Newcomer
Derek Kage
Performer of the Year
Rhyheim Shabazz
Best All-Sex Movie
Deep Blue: A Greek Aventure, BelAmi
Best Bi Sex Scene
Finn Harding, Roman Todd & Izzy Wilde, Call Center Cocks, WhyNotBi.com
Best Director – Feature
Tony Dimarco & Ben Rush, Guilty as Sin, Raging Stallion
Best Director - Non-Feature
Jake Jaxson, Raphael Massicotte & RJ Sebastian, Boys Will Be Boys, CockyBoys/RandyBlue.com
Best Duo Sex Scene
Silas Brooks & Spikey Dee, Big Cock Swap, HelixStudios.com
Best Feature
Overdrive, Raging Stallion
Best Featurette
Kinky Scenarios, Icon Male (Dante Colle & Jkab Ethan Dale)
Best Fetish Scene
Spikey Dee & Joey Mills, Self-Sucking Twink is Packing Large, Men.com
Best Group Sex Scene
Blessed Boy, Beau Butler, Gabriel Coimbra, Marcelo Caiazzo, Markin Wolf, Gael, Samuel Hodecker, Grande Simões, Andy Rodrigues & Alex Rosso; Blame it on Rio, NakedSword X Rhyheim
Best Leading Actor
Derek Kage, Overdrive, Raging Stallion
Best Actor - Featurette
Jayden Marcos, Marriage Material, DisruptiveFilms.com/ASGMax.com
Best Supporting Actor
Paul Wagner, Overdrive, Raging Stallion
Best Three-Way Sex Scene
Cole Blue, Adam Snow & Noah White, The Professor: Meeting the Assistant, Gaycest.com/CarnalPlus.com
GayVN Hall of Fame Inductees
Michael “Shante” Youens
Stuart Davis, BelAmi

=== Fan awards ===
Favorite All-Male Creator Collab
Rhyheim Shabazz, Elijah Zayne & Matthew Ellis
Favorite Cock
Drake Von
Favorite Body
Cade Maddox
Favorite Daddy
LeGrand Wolf
Favorite Dom
Austin Wolf
Favorite Creator Site Star
Rhyheim Shabazz
Favorite Cam/Creator Couple
Colby Chambers & Mickey Knox
Favorite Top
Cade Maddox
Favorite Bear
Beau Butler
Favorite Bottom
Felix Fox
Favorite Twink
Drake Von
Favorite Porn Star Creator
Austin Wolf
Favorite Butt
Alejo Ospina
Favorite Cam Guy
Cole Connor
Favorite Versatile
Dante Colle
Favorite Newcomer
Clark Reid
Favorite FTM Star
Noah Way

== 2025 ==
Awards were at The Theater at Virgin Hotels Las Vegas on January 20, 2025. The show was hosted by Alec Mapa, Jkab Ethan Dale and Bruno Alcantara.

Performer of the Year
Rhyheim Shabazz
Best Actor
Bastian Karim - The Mafia, Staghomme/CarnalPlus
Best Actor – Featurette
Michael Jackman - Scream Cream, CockyBoys
Best All-Sex Movie
Cherry Twinks, Helix Studios
Best Bi Sex Scene
Trevor Brooks, Jewel Diamant & Reese Rideout - Bisexual Stepdad Goes Wild, WhyNotBi
Best Directing – Feature
Ben Rush - Bred & Breakfast: All the Way Inn, NakedSword Originals
Best Directing – Featurette
Alter Sin - Prisoner of War: 10 Years Later, Men.com
Best Directing – Non-Feature
Jerome Exupery, Marty Stevens & Alter Sin - Casa Del Amor: House of BelAmi Parts 1, BelAmi
Best DP Scene
Heath Halo, Hazel Hoffman & Sean Xavier - Bred and Breakfast 2: All the Way Inn, NakedSword Originals
Best Duo Sex Scene
Sir Peter & Rhyheim Shabazz - Sir Peter and Rhyheim: The Main Event (Part 2), NakedSword Originals;
Best Feature
Heart On, NakedSword Originals
Best Featurette
Allen King & Paddy O'Brian - Prisoner of War: 10 Years Later, Men.com
Best Fetish Scene
Oliver Carter & Lane Colten - What’s Your Kink?, CockyBoys
Best Group Sex Scene
Liam Arnolds, Marlon Costa, Well Cruz, Jonatas, Gael Kriok, Rafael Silva & Markin Wolf - A Fun Orgy of Debauchery, Voyr
Best Newcomer
Matthew Ellis
Best Oral Scene
Beau Butler, Ryder Flynn, Heath Halo & Cole Ryan - The Beach House, Raging Stallion
Best Screenplay
Ben Rush - Heart On, NakedSword Originals
Best Supporting Actor
Ty Roderick - The Iron Pa, SayUncle.com
Best Supporting Actor – Featurette
Allen King - Prisoner of War: 10 Years Later, Men.com
Best Three-Way Sex Scene
James Cassidy, Bryce Jax & Austin Wilde - Sharing Is Caring, GuysinSweatpants

=== Fan awards ===
Favorite Cock
Cade Maddox
Favorite Body
Cade Maddox
Favorite Top
Cade Maddox
Hottest All-Male Creator Collab
Drake Von & Jayden Marcos
Favorite Porn Star Creator
Dom King
Favorite Cam/Creator Couple
Beau Butler & Nick Butler
Hottest Porn Newcomer
SantanaXXL
Favorite Bear
Beau Butler

Favorite Dom
Malik Delgaty
Favorite Butt
Matthew Ellis
Favorite Indie Creator
SantanaXXL
Favorite Twink
Drake Von
Favorite Bottom
Matthew Ellis
Favorite Cam Guy
Skyy Knox
Favorite Daddy
Sir Peter
Favorite Versatile
Roman Todd
Favorite Transmasc Star
Noah Way

== 2026 ==
Awards were at The Theater at Virgin Hotels Las Vegas on January 22, 2026. The show was hosted by Alec Mapa, Drake Von and Tony Genius.

Performer of the Year
Sir Peter
Best Newcomer
Jake Mathews
Best Actor
Paddy O'Brian - To the Nines, Falcon/MenAtPlay
Best Actor - Featurette
Reese Rideout - The Bussycal, Men.com
Best Supporting Actor
Dom King - Dawn of the Gladiators, Men.com
Best All-Sex Movie
Spain in the Ass, NakedSword Originals
Best Bi Sex Scene
Malik Delgaty, Matcha Fae & Mateo Zagal - Bisexual Couple Boinks the Pool Boy, WhyNotBi
Best Directing – Feature
Ben Rush & Jessica Jasmin - Wild Game, NakedSword X Disruptive Films
Best Directing – Featurette
Marc MacNamara - The Tight Lotus, Men.com
Best Directing – Non-Feature
Ben Rush & Alter Sin - Spain in the Ass, NakedSword Originals
Best DP Scene
Zach Letoa, Tyler Moore & CJ Parker - Double Packed Zach, Helix Studios
Best Duo Sex Scene
Mister Roger & Rhyheim Shabazz - Rhyheim Flips with Mr Rodger, Voyr.com
Best Feature
Wild Game, NakedSword X Disruptive Films
Best Featurette
Seth Cain, Alex Kof & Aiden Ward - Just Say Yes, CockyBoys
Best Fetish Scene
Cole Connor & Carter Woods - Breaking Free, Disruptive Films/ASGmax.com
Best Fourgy Scene
Malik Delgaty, Filou Fitt, Dom King & MrDeepVoice - Dawn of the Gladiators, Men.com
Best Group Sex Scene
Peter Annaud, Jay Campion, Hugo Carter, Steve Collins, Billy Coogan, Johnny Eilish, Shane Medes, Timmy Morrison, Kian O’Connor & Michael Ross - Return to Frisky Summer 3: Dream Come True (“Orgy Part 2”), BelAmi
Best Oral Sex Scene
Apolo Adrii, Cole Blue, Lane Colten, Milo Miles, Eddie Patrick, Taylor Reign, Reece Scott, Guy Spencer, Adam Snow, Jay Stryker, Dylan Tides & Noah White - Deeper Deep Throat (“Vol 1: Hole’s a Hole”), Carnal+ Originals/CarnalPlus.com/BarebackPlus.com
Best Screenplay
Ben Rush - Wild Game, NakedSword X Disruptive Films
Best Three-Way Sex Scene
Cole Blue, Adam Snow & Noah White - Deeper Deep Throat (“Break for Cole”), Carnal+ Originals/CarnalPlus.com/BarebackPlus.com
GayVN Hall of Fame Inductee
Steve Cruz

=== Fan Awards ===
Favorite Bottom
Matthew Ellis
Favorite Bear
Brody Meyer
Favorite Independent Creator
SantanaXXL
Favorite Body
Cade Maddox
Favorite Cock
Adam Snow
Favorite Top
Dom King
Favorite Porn Star Creator
Cade Maddox
Hottest All-Male Creator Collab
Dom King & Parker Nolan
Favorite Versatile
Parker Nolan
Favorite Cam/Creator Couple
Beau Butler & Nick Butler
Favorite Daddy
LeGrand Wolf
Favorite Butt
Alejo Ospina
Favorite Dom
Malik Delgaty
Hottest Studio Newcomer
Arno Antino
Favorite International Star
Allen King
Favorite Twink
Jake Preston
Favorite Cam Guy
William Miguel
Favorite Transmasc Star
Noah Way

== See also ==
- Adult Erotic Gay Video Awards
- List of Grabby recipients
- List of gay pornography awards
- Gay Erotic Video Awards
- List of male performers in gay porn films
