= Austin Wolf =

American former gay pornographic actor (born 1981)

- Wolf in New Orleans in 2016
- Born: Justin Heath Smith; April 3, 1981 (age 45); Alvarado, Texas, U.S.
- Other names: James Smith; Austin Wolfe
- Occupations: Pornographic actor; Escort
- Years active: 2012–2024
- Height: 6 ft 4 in (1.93 m)
- Criminal charges: Enticement of a minor for sex (18 U.S.C. § 2422)
- Criminal penalty: 228 months imprisonment; 10 years supervised release; restitution; asset forfeiture; sex offender registration
- Criminal status: Imprisoned until 2040

Justin Heath Smith (born April 3, 1981), known professionally as Austin Wolf, is an American former gay pornographic film actor and convicted sex offender. His career ended in scandal following his arrest for the receipt, distribution and possession of child sexual abuse material and subsequent confession to other acts of child sexual abuse and exploitation.

Born and raised in Texas, Wolf moved to New York City at age 20, where he became an escort. He made his debut as a pornographic actor in 2012 with the gay pornographic studio Randy Blue, with whom he worked for three years before signing an exclusive contract with Falcon Studios. He began working exclusively with CockyBoys starting in 2019 and with Men.com starting in 2023.

In 2024, Wolf was arrested and charged with possessing and distributing hundreds of videos of child sexual abuse material. In 2025, he pleaded guilty to a felony charge of enticing a minor to engage in illegal sexual activity and was sentenced to 19 years in prison.

As of 2026 Wolf is an inmate at Federal Correctional Institution, Seagoville with a listed release date of June 2, 2040.

== Early life ==
Justin Heath Smith was born on April 3, 1981, in Alvarado, Texas, where he was also raised. He has one younger sister. At age 17, he started coming out to his friends and family, including his mother, who was initially upset before coming to accept Wolf's sexuality. At the age of 20, he left Texas and moved to New York, where he worked as a designer furniture retailer. He then worked at a gay bar as a bartender before creating a profile on the former escorting site Rentboy and starting to work as an escort.

== Career ==
In November 2012, Wolf made his pornographic debut with a solo video for gay pornographic studio Randy Blue. He has stated that his family was supportive of his entering the pornographic industry, describing his mother as his "biggest fan", and has attributed his skills as a pornographic actor to his sex addiction. He then worked with Randy Blue for three years, where he made his first partner video starring pornographic actor Nicco Sky. He won the awards for Best Top and Best Body at the International Escort Awards, an awards ceremony for male escorts, in 2013. He signed an exclusive contract with Falcon Entertainment in April 2015 while appearing in releases for pornographic studios Raging Stallion and Hot House. Wolf made cameos as a "shirtless person" on The Wendy Williams Show three times through being friends with the show's art director, Michael Lee Scott.

In 2012, he worked on the Broadway show Bares XXII: Happy Endings. Wolf made a profile on OnlyFans, a subscription-based platform where creators set their own rates, in April 2017, where he began uploading videos of himself having sex from when he was in his twenties. He became one of the first pornographic actors to use OnlyFans to sell content. He reached over one thousand subscribers within two weeks of starting his account. In October 2018, a preview clip from an eight-minute-long 4MyFans video of an off-duty Delta Air Lines flight attendant performing oral sex on Wolf while in uniform and in an airplane bathroom aroused controversy after being uploaded to Twitter, leading to the flight attendant's suspension due to his employee ID being visible and widespread tabloid coverage of the video. The flight attendant stated that he was unaware that the tryst was being recorded, which Wolf denied. Wolf soon deleted his Instagram profile, stating that he wanted to "get his life back on track". That same month, he became Pornhub's most-searched gay pornographic actor and won the Str8UpGayPorn Award for Favorite Daddy. Also that month, he uploaded another video of him having sex with an Uber driver. Wolf was the fourth most popular gay pornographic actor on Pornhub in 2018.

In April 2019, he signed an exclusive contract with gay pornographic studio CockyBoys. He won the award for Most Popular Gay Performer at the 2nd Pornhub Awards in October 2019, where he gave an emotional acceptance speech. Wolf was Pornhub's third most-searched gay pornographic actor in 2019. In January 2020, he won the award for Favorite Fan Content Creator at the 3rd Str8UpGay Porn Awards. He was one of Pornhub's brand ambassadors in April 2020, when they launched their satirical "Scrubhub" video series as a response to the COVID-19 pandemic. Men.com signed Wolf to an exclusive contract in January 2023. He made his premiere for the studio in Fast & Vicious, in which he played a gangster opposite Skyy Knox.

In November–December 2023, he recruited top porn stars from around the world in his inaugural Collab Week event at Almar Resort in Puerto Vallarta, Mexico.

== Public image ==
Wolf is considered a pioneer in making OnlyFans a popular pornographic platform. He owns his own subscription-based pornographic website, 4MyFans. David Levesley of British GQ called Wolf "a big name in gay porn" in June 2019, while, in April 2020 JC Adams of XBIZ described him as "a veteran performer with a lauded filmography" who "cemented his stardom" by being "a dazzlingly prolific content creator". In January 2019, Vanity Fair called Wolf a "gay porn mega-star", while, in January 2020, Mickey Keating of Instinct called him "the gay porn star of the world right now". Matt Rettenmund of Boy Culture ranked Wolf one of the greatest gay pornographic actors of all time. Daniel Villarreal of Queerty called his "tribal" belly button tattoo a trademark of his.

Wolf has described his political beliefs as "completely aligned" with those of comedian Kathy Griffin. In June 2020, during the George Floyd protests, Wolf posted a video on Twitter in which he called on pornographic studios to take down any content featuring fellow pornographic actor Billy Santoro who had advocated for police to shoot Black looters. JustForFans, another subscription-based pornographic site, took down Santoro's account soon after. Wolf soon sparked controversy for telling a Black commenter on Instagram, who wrote that America was about "power and exploitation", that they should move.

== 2025 conviction for sex crimes ==
On April 21, 2024, the Federal Bureau of Investigation (FBI) executed a search warrant in Wolf's Manhattan apartment, where an SD card containing hundreds of videos of child sexual abuse material, which he reportedly received and sent anonymously with an undercover FBI agent through Telegram between March 24 and 28, was found. According to Damian Williams, then the United States attorney for the Southern District of New York, the videos included one of a 10-year-old child being raped and bound by a man, while others contained children as young as infants.

In June 2024, the United States Department of Justice announced that Wolf had been arrested in New York and charged with one count of distribution and receipt of child sexual abuse material and one count of possession of child sexual abuse material. Following his arrest, his Twitter account was deactivated.

On June 20, 2025, Wolf pleaded guilty to one felony charge of enticing a 15-year-old boy to have sex. The charge carried a mandatory prison sentence of ten years to life. The information to which Wolf plead guilty notes several other acts including one instance trying to sexually abuse two children (a nine-year-old and a 14-year-old) and two separate occasions in which he attempted to arrange the sexual abuse of pre-pubescent children with individuals claiming to be their guardians. Records of Wolf's communications showed that he repeatedly asked for child sexual abuse material from persons he believed to be minors, and that he distributed child sexual abuse material to 15 other individuals.

At his change-of-plea proceeding, Wolf stated "I take full 100 percent responsibility for my actions and I am prepared for the consequences".

On September 30, 2025, Wolf was sentenced to 19 years in prison, followed by 10 years of supervised release, and a $40,000 fine. Wolf forfeited multiple hard drives, smartphones, and computers authorities seized with evidence of child sexual abuse material or otherwise used in criminal activity. When completing his prison term, supervised release terms prohibit Wolf from viewing or possessing any form of pornography. He will be registered as a sex offender.

Jay Clayton, the United States attorney for the Southern District of New York, wrote in a statement following his sentencing that "every New Yorker wants him and those like him off our streets for as long as possible and never again near our children" and that "there is no place for [him] in New York other than prison".

== Awards and nominations ==
List of awards and nominations, with award, year, category, nominated work, result, and reference shown
Award	Year	Category	Nominee(s)	Result	scope="
Cybersocket Web Awards	2014	Best Sex Scene	Austin Wolfe and Caleb Strong	Nominated	
Cybersocket Web Awards	2014	Best New Pornstar	Himself	Nominated	
Cybersocket Web Awards	2016	Best Pornstar	Himself	Nominated	
Cybersocket Web Awards	2017	Best Pornstar	Himself	Nominated	
Cybersocket Web Awards	2018	Best Pornstar	Himself	Nominated	
Cybersocket Web Awards	2018	Best Sex Scene	TKO Total Knockouts	Nominated	
Cybersocket Web Awards	2020	Best Porn Star	Himself	Nominated	
Gay Fleshbot Awards	2019	Best Clip Performer	Himself	Nominated	
Gay Fleshbot Awards	2019	Performer of the Year	Himself	Nominated	
Gay Fleshbot Awards	2019	Best Group Sex Scene	Aventón	Nominated	
GayVN Awards	2018	Favorite Daddy	Himself	Nominated	
GayVN Awards	2018	Best Fetish Scene	Skuff: Rough Trade 1	Won	
GayVN Awards	2018	Social Media Star	Himself	Nominated	
GayVN Awards	2018	Best Group Sex Scene	The Fixer	Nominated	
GayVN Awards	2019	Best Three-Way Sex Scene	Aventón	Nominated	
GayVN Awards	2019	Best Top	Himself	Nominated	
GayVN Awards	2019	Best Duo	Cross Fuck	Nominated	
GayVN Awards	2020	Favorite Dom	Himself	Won	
GayVN Awards	2020	Best Supporting Actor	Rags to Riches	Nominated	
GayVN Awards	2021	Favorite Top	Himself	Won	
GayVN Awards	2022	Favorite Dom	Himself	Won	
GayVN Awards	2023	Favorite Body	Himself	Won	
GayVN Awards	2023	Favorite Creator Site Star	Himself	Won	
Grabby Awards	2014	Best Newcomer	Himself	Nominated	
Grabby Awards	2014	Manly Man	Himself	Nominated	
Grabby Awards	2016	Hottest Top	Himself	Nominated	
Grabby Awards	2016	Manly Man	Himself	Nominated	
Grabby Awards	2016	Hottest Rimming	Fined Tuned Ass	Nominated	
Grabby Awards	2016	Hottest Rimming	Total Exposure 1	Nominated	
Grabby Awards	2017	Hottest Top	Himself	Nominated	
Grabby Awards	2017	Manly Man	Himself	Nominated	
Grabby Awards	2017	Performer of the Year	Himself	Nominated	
Grabby Awards	2018	Best Actor	The Fixer	Nominated	
Grabby Awards	2018	Best Group	The Fixer	Nominated	
Grabby Awards	2019	Hottest Top	Himself	Nominated	
Grabby Awards	2019	Best Duo	Cross Fuck	Nominated	
Grabby Awards	2019	Best Three Way	Rideshare	Nominated	
Grabby Awards	2021	Performer of the Year	Himself	Nominated	
Grabby Awards	2021	Hottest Top	Himself	Nominated	
Grabby Awards	2021	Hottest Body	Himself	Nominated	
Grabby Awards	2021	Hottest Daddy	Himself	Won	
Grabby Awards	2021	Hottest Rimming	A Man and His Boy Part 2	Nominated	
Grabby Awards	2023	Hottest Top	Himself	Nominated	
Grabby Awards	2023	Hottest Daddy	Himself	Won	
International Escort Awards	2013	Best Newcomer	Himself	Nominated	
International Escort Awards	2013	Best Top	Himself	Won	
International Escort Awards	2013	Best Body	Himself	Nominated	
International Escort Awards	2014	Best Pornstar Escort	Himself	Nominated	
International Escort Awards	2014	Best Body	Himself	Won	
International Escort Awards	2015	Best Top	Himself	Won	
Pornhub Awards	2019	Most Popular Gay Performer	Himself	Won	
Pornhub Awards	2020	Most Popular Gay Performer	Himself	Nominated	
Pornhub Awards	2020	Top Daddy Performer	Himself	Won	
Prowler Awards	2020	Best International Pornstar	Himself	Nominated	
Str8UpGayPorn Awards	2018	Favorite Daddy	Himself	Won	
Str8UpGayPorn Awards	2018	Favorite Gay Porn Star	Himself	Nominated	
Str8UpGayPorn Awards	2018	Best Group Sex Scene	The Fixer	Nominated	
Str8UpGayPorn Awards	2018	Best Topping Performance	The Fixer	Nominated	
Str8UpGayPorn Awards	2019	Favorite Body	Himself	Nominated	
Str8UpGayPorn Awards	2019	Favorite Topping Performance	Austin Wolf and Nico Leon	Nominated	
Str8UpGayPorn Awards	2019	Favorite Fan Content Creator	Himself	Nominated	
Str8UpGayPorn Awards	2020	Favorite Fan Content Creator	Himself	Won	
Str8UpGayPorn Awards	2022	Favorite Body	Himself	Nominated	
XBIZ Awards	2019	Gay Performer of the Year	Himself	Nominated	
XBIZ Awards	2020	Gay Performer of the Year	Himself	Nominated	
XBIZ Awards	2021	Gay Performer of the Year	Himself	Nominated	
