= Christian Styles =

American pornographic actor and content creator (1997–2026)

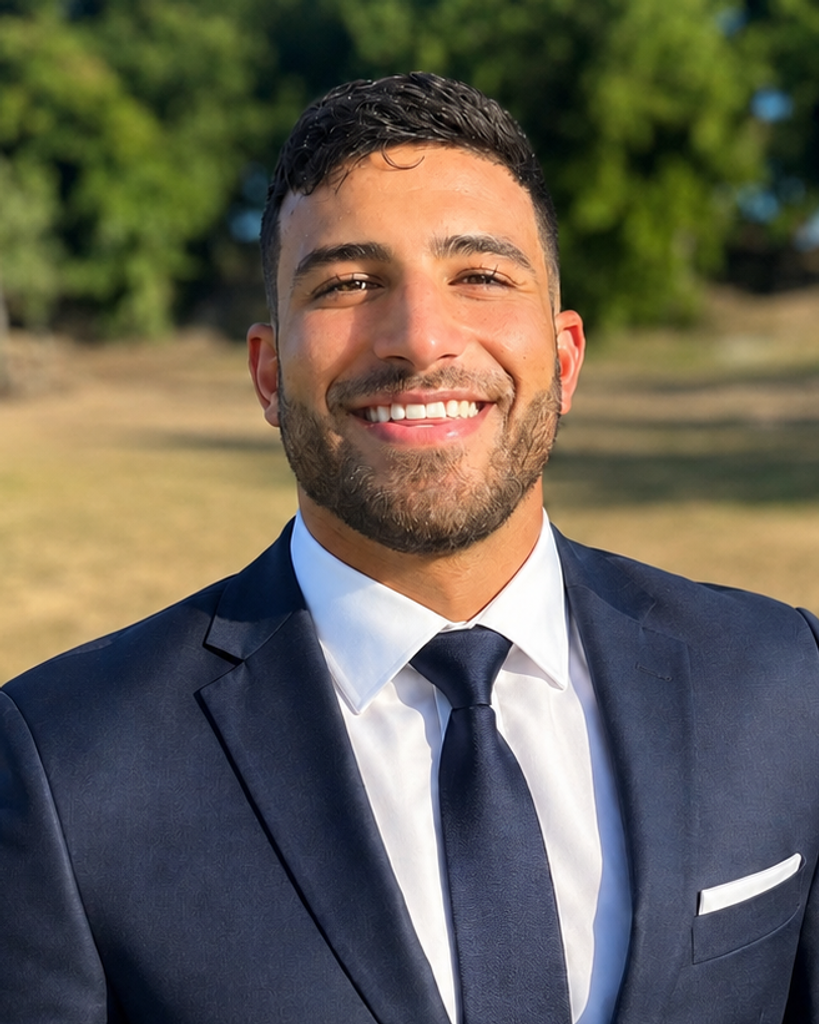
- Styles in an undated portrait
- Born: Zachary Christian Jaghab; January 17, 1997; Canton, Michigan, U.S.
- Died: August 20, 2026 (aged 29)
- Occupations: Pornographic film actor; Online content creator
- Years active: 2021–2026

Zachary Christian Jaghab (January 17, 1997 – August 20, 2026), known professionally as Christian Styles, was an American pornographic film actor and online content creator known for his work in gay pornography. Active in adult entertainment from 2021 until 2026, he developed an online audience of more than one million followers across Instagram and X. In 2023, Styles and fellow performer Chris Damned won a fan-voted GayVN Award for Favorite All-Male Creator Collab.

== Early life ==
Styles was born on January 17, 1997, and was raised in Canton, Michigan. He is the son of Johnny and Ellen Jaghab. His family is of Middle Eastern origin, and he grew up in an Arab-American family connected to the Antiochian Orthodox Christian community in Michigan.

Styles graduated from Plymouth–Canton Educational Park in 2015.

== Career ==
Zachary Jaghab entered the adult entertainment industry in 2021 under the stage name Christian Styles. He worked both as a performer and as an independent creator, distributing subscription content through OnlyFans. He also worked with the adult studio MenCrush, which was among the industry organizations to publish a tribute after his death. Pride Source noted that his social media presence included videos of him rollerblading around Michigan in addition to material connected to his professional work.

In 2023, Styles and Chris Damned received the fan-voted GayVN Award for Favorite All-Male Creator Collab. He received additional GayVN nominations in 2024.

== Death ==
Styles died on August 20, 2026, at the age of 29. In September 2026, it was revealed that he died from alcohol and mitragynine poisoning. His funeral was held with a religious service at an Orthodox church in Livonia, Michigan.

== Awards and nominations ==
Year	Award	Category	Result
2023	GayVN Awards	Favorite All-Male Creator Collab	Won
2024	GayVN Awards	Favorite Bottom	Nominated
2024	GayVN Awards	Favorite Creator Site Star	Nominated
