= Teddy Torres =

French gay pornographic film actor

- Born: November 18, 1991 (age 34); Saint-Gilles-Croix-de-Vie, Vendée, Pays de la Loire, France

Teddy Torres (born November 18, 1991) is a French gay pornographic film actor and hairdresser. He is known for his work in the bear segment, and his body hair and stocky build contributed to him winning the fan-voted Favorite Bear at the GayVN Awards for three consecutive years in 2019, 2020, and 2021.

== Career ==
Before entering the adult film industry, Torres worked as a hairdresser and was employed at a Paris salon named “Rock Hair”. He later relocated from Paris to Montreal, Canada, where he continued working in hairdressing while developing his career as an adult film performer.

== Awards and nominations ==
=== CyberSocket Awards ===
- 2020 – Nominated: Best Porn Star
- 2022 – Winner: Bear of the Year

=== GayVN Awards ===
- 2018 – Nominated: Best Bear Scene, Huntsman (2017)
- 2019 – Winner: Fan Award – Favorite Bear
- 2019 – Nominated: Best Group Sex Scene, Three Wishes (2018)
- 2019 – Nominated: Best Group Sex Scene, Pirates: A Gay XXX Parody (2017)
- 2020 – Winner: Fan Award – Favorite Bear
- 2020 – Nominated: Best Three-Way Sex Scene, Cutler X and Viktor Rom and Teddy Torres (2019)
- 2021 – Winner: Fan Award – Favorite Bear
- 2021 – Nominated: Best Group Sex Scene, Live For Christmas (2019)
- 2024 – Nominated: Fan Award – Favorite Bear

=== PinkX Gay Video Awards ===
- 2019 – Winner: Best Porn Star

=== Pornhub Awards ===
- 2019 – Nominated: Zam Zaddy Top Daddy Performer

=== Raven's Eden Awards ===
- 2021 – Nominated: Best International Performer
- 2021 – Nominated: Best Threesome, Loaded: Muscle Fuck (2020)

== See also ==
- List of performers in gay porn films
