= Active Duty (web site) =

American gay pornographic film studio

- Website type: Adult website
- Available in: English, Slovene, Russian, Spanish, Balochi, Arabic, Hindi, Persian, Romanian, German, Japanese, Korean, Chinese, Macedonian, Greek, Ukrainian, French
- Owner: Gamma Entertainment
- Website: www.activeduty.com
- Registration: Optional (previews only)
- Current status: active

Active Duty is the umbrella name for the American, originally North Carolina–based independent gay pornographic film studios founded by Dennis Ashe specializing in the production of pornographic movies. It features the portrayals of military men who are gay, straight, and bisexual, engaging in solo or gay sexual action. Dink Flamingo was the pseudonym of the producer-director of the films. Since Active Duty was acquired by Montreal-based Gamma Entertainment in 2014, Dink Flamingo is a trademark that no longer refers to a person.

== Dirty Bird Pictures ==
Dink Flamingo, the owner of the popular Active Duty Production company, branched out in 2007 to form a new video line with plot-intensive porn headed up by directors Mike Donner and Jett Blakk. Steve Jerome is the director of operations. Dink Flamingo is the executive producer and owns Dirty Bird Pictures.

== Controversies ==
On January 27, 2006, Fort Bragg (North Carolina) announced that it had become aware that some of the men involved in the website were from the 82nd Airborne Division. A local station, WRAL, briefly mentions a Dink Flamingo and Active Duty as a part of a possible criminal investigation by military authorities.

On February 24, 2006, Fort Bragg issued a press release stating that seven men had been charged with violating the Uniform Code of Military Justice for the crime of sodomy and engaging in sexual conduct on a pornographic website. All of the men charged were identified by military investigators as performing on the Active Duty porn site.

In 2009, Active Duty formally requested a news article be rescinded because it possibly provided the actual name of an active duty service member. It was later learned that the performer had been honorably discharged from the military before starring in an Active Duty film.

== Awards and nominations ==
- 2007 GayVN Awards winner of Best Alternative Video for "Rear Gunners 2".
- 2008 Cybersocket Web Awards winner of Best Live XXX Show.
- 2009 GayVN Awards Hall of Fame (Dink Flamingo).
- 2009 Cybersocket Web Awards Best Original Theme Site.
