= Rod Barry =

American pornographic actor and director

- Born: December 5, 1973 (age 51) upstate New York
- Height: 5 ft 10 in (178 cm)
- Website: www.rodbarryworld.blogspot.com

Rod Barry (born December 5, 1973; also Rob deBaer, Rod Berry, Rod) is a former pornographic actor and director from the United States who has been credited in over 150 pornographic films and internet-based shows since entering the industry in 1996. Most of Barry's appearances have been in the gay pornography genre, but he has appeared in bisexual, transsexual and heterosexual videos. In 2008, he was inducted into the gay pornography industry's Hall of Fame.

== Career ==
Barry entered the industry in 1996, being discovered by Dirk Yates, and his first film was The Few, The Proud, The Naked #8. Barry won a Grabby Award for Best Supporting Actor in 1998, for his performance in A Lesson Learned, and the Best Supporting Actor award at the GayVN Awards for White Trash. He has worked for many leading directors, including Chi Chi LaRue, John Rutherford, Wash West, Steven Scarborough, Michael Zen, Mike Donner, and Doug Jeffries. In 2005, he directed his first gay adult video, Down The Drain, for All Worlds Video, which incorporated a "making of" section that was considered important in the development of the genre. Barry went on to direct a series called Argentinean Auditions for the studio.

Barry was inducted into the GayVN Hall of Fame at the 10th annual award ceremony in February 2008. In 2008, he launched RodBarryWorld.com, a video-on-demand website.

== Personal life ==
After completing one year in college, Barry served in the United States Marine Corps in 1994, then entered the pornographic industry.

Barry's sexual identity has been the topic of debate. In a 1998 interview with director Jerry Douglas, Barry said: "I wouldn't say, heterosexual. I'd say sexual. Sexual is you like an orgasm and you don't care how you get it". Barry was noted as a "famous example" of a "gay-for-pay" performer, and Jeffrey Escoffier records his decision to perform full gay scenes was "based solely on financial compensation".

In 2009, Barry wrote about his recovery from alcohol abuse.

== Awards and nominations ==
- 1997 Gay Erotic Video Awards nominee for Best Newcomer
- 1998 Gay Erotic Video Awards nominee for Best Top
- 1999 Grabby Awards winner of Best Supporting Actor in A Lesson Learned (All Worlds Video)
- 2002 Grabby Awards nominee for Best Supporting Actor, Best Duo Sex Scene and Best Trio Sex Scene
- 2002 GayVN Awards winner of Best Supporting Actor in White Trash
- 2005 GayVN Awards nominee for Best Actor in Thirst
- 2006 Grabby Awards winner of Hottest Versatile Performer
- 2008 GayVN Awards inducted into the Hall of Fame

== See also ==
- List of male performers in gay porn films
