= Out of Athens =

Part 1 DVD cover

Out of Athens is a 2000 two-part gay pornographic film from Falcon Studios, starring John Brosnan and Roland Dane, and directed by Johnny Rutherford. Part one runs 87 minutes, and part two runs 74 minutes. In the film, after not being accepted to a fraternity club for his status, John Brosnan goes to Athens, Greece, posing as a Harvard alumni for a reunion gathering. There, Brosnan is exposed as an imposter and then is gang raped. A Greek resident Roland Dane, whom Brosnan met earlier during the tour, finds him lying on the streets and takes him to Dane's place, where they have sex.

The filming done by Todd Montgomery occurred in California and Greece. It is loosely based on director Rutherford's experience in Greece in his earlier years. The reception has been generally positive; it won Grabby Awards and GayVN Awards in 2001.

== Plot ==
Note: Names of real-life performers are substituted for character names.

A college janitor Johnny Brosnan and his friends want to join the fraternity. They are accepted by the fraternity club except Brosnan, solely due to his status. Later, Brosnan goes to the cruise ship and steals cash and a Harvard University sweatshirt from his casual interest Travis Wade. When the ship lands at Greece, Brosnan, posing as a Harvard alumnus, is invited by one of Harvard alumni (Lindon Hawk) to their reunion party. Then he meets Ronald Dane, the Greek resident who helps him tour around, and then is invited to stay at the place of Dane's cousin George Vidanov and Vidanov's partner, Joe Calderon. At the Harvard reunion gathering, Brosnan is exposed as an imposter by Wade, who just arrives, and is gang raped. Later, Dane goes out looking for him, finds him "dirty and disheveled" at the streets, and manages to retrieve him back to his cousin's place. At the end, Brosnan and Dane make passionate love.

=== Scenes ===
Part one:

1. Fraternity orgy: Cameron Fox, Hans Ebson, Jeremy Tucker, Jeremy Jordan, Emilio Santos, Tristan Paris, Billy Kincaid, Seth Adkins, Nick Young
2. Cruise ship: Johnny Brosnan and Travis Wade
3. Greek tour: Johnny Brosnan and Roland Dane
4. Threesome: Alexei Gromoff (credited as Thomas Williams), Jeffrey Dickinson, José Ganatti (Some copies omit this scene.)
5. Terrace threesome: Dean Phoenix, Franco Corsini, Eric Leneau; Johnny Brosnan participates for a short while and then leaves.

Part two:

1. Residence: Joe Calderon and George Vidanov; Johnny Brosnan witnesses the whole scene
2. Flashback: Colby Taylor and Eric Hart
3. Gang rape at reunion party: Johnny Brosnan against Colby Taylor, Travis Wade, Robert Balint, Erik Hanlan, Lindon Hawk, Matt Spencer, David Moretti, Ryan Michaels
4. Finale: Johnny Brosnan and Roland Dane

== Production ==
Out of Athens was directed by John Rutherford, the past executive vice president and president of Falcon Studios, and shot on film and videotape by Todd Montgomery in California and Greece. Its story is loosely based on Rutherford's youthful experiences. Rutherford said, "Out of Athens was my story[;] I decided to take three months off and go to Europe after high school. And I traveled around Greece...I did a loose story [based] on my travels and the conflict of being who you are."

== Reception ==
Giacomo Tramontagna from The Guide rated the film four stars and called it "visually splendid". However, Tramontagna found Johnny Brosnan's character "mixed up in ways hard to decipher [and] ways that run deep." FriskyBoy from FriskyFans.org praised it as a whole and everything about it, including performances and production values. T.J. Maxxwell of the TLA Video rated both parts whole four stars each. A reviewer Jeremy Spencer praised it, but found several things "lacking" and Brosnan's character "too wishy-washy". Bryan Holden from Rad Video rated each part 4.25 points out of five, calling them "thoroughly enjoyable." Holden wrote that "all [performers] are strikingly handsome[,] [t]he videography is crisp and often dazzling, and the story is interesting but not intrusive." Cameron Wood from NYM Media called it "a beautiful flick with great looking guys, beautiful scenery, and hot sex[,]" but found the threesome scene of Alexei Gromoff, Jeffrey Dickinson, and José Ganatti "boring". Nguyen Tan Hoang in the book Porn Studies called the two-part film the "loose porn [remake] of the Matt Damon homosexual thriller The Talented Mr. Ripley."

The fraternity orgy scene was awarded the "Best Group Scene" at the 2001 Grabby Awards and the 2001 GayVN Awards. John Rutherford and Todd Montgomery were awarded, respectively, the "Best Director" and the "Best Videography" at the 2001 GayVN Awards. The film was awarded the "Best Video" in the 1999 Probe/Men in Video Awards.
