= Legrand Wolf =

American adult gay performer

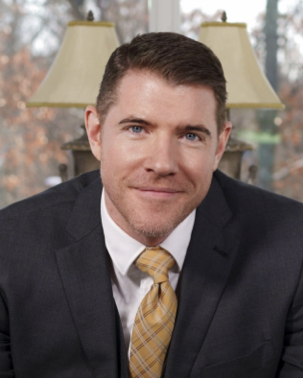
- Legrand Wolf in February 2022
- Born: May 13, 1978 (age 48)
- Occupations: Pornographic film director, actor, entrepreneur
- Height: 1.98 m (6 ft 6 in)
- Spouse: Jay (m. 2009)

Legrand Wolf (born May 13, 1978) is an American adult film gay performer, producer, director, and entrepreneur, best known as the founder and CEO of Carnal Media, an adult entertainment company, and home of CarnalPlus. He has won four GayVN Awards and thirteen Grabby Awards for his work.

== Early life ==
In his youth, Wolf followed Mormonism, even being a Mormon missionary during his teen years. He pursued higher education, studying microbiology at Brigham Young University, and later attending medical school at the University of Utah. It was during this period while in medical school, in his mid-twenties, that he came out as gay.

After his first year in medical school, Legrand started a lecture group called "Family Home Evening" (FHE) specifically for gay Mormon return missionaries. The group meetings included academic discussions and presentations by guest speakers. During the first FHE, Legrand met his partner and future husband Jay.

Legrand and his husband moved to Minneapolis after Legrand was hired to project manage a research study at the University of Minnesota. The research he worked on explored the intersection of technology and sexual behavior among a particular group of people described as "men who have sex with men", not necessarily "gay men". The information gathered in this study later helped them when they launched adult websites.

== Career ==
While on their honeymoon, Legrand Wolf and his husband conceived the idea of creating Mormon-themed adult content. They initially hired men via Craigslist to dress up in Mormon outfits and masturbate on camera. The site became self-sustaining but was paused for two years. Subsequently, they conceived GrowlBoys between late 2012 and early 2013. In 2012, Legrand and Jay re-launched Mormonboyz. At the same time, the couple launched a clothing label called MormonsSecret selling Magic Mormon Underwear.

In 2018, Wolf and his partner established Carnal Media, following their acquisition of the all-male affiliate network GunzBlazing. The company produces a range of websites under the Carnal+ streaming platform, including BoyForSale, FunSizeBoys, Gaycest, MasonicBoys, Staghomme, CatholicBoys and BaptistBoys. These websites incorporate various fictional and fantasy-based scenarios involving themes such as age difference, dominance and submission, transformation, and religious roleplay.

Legrand Wolf has won many awards as both a performer and director, both individually and with his company. In 2023, he was named Director of the Year at Fleshbot and Performer of the Year at the Grabbys America. In that same year, he also received the award for Best All-Sex Movie at the Grabbys America for Anatomy Lesson, where he played Dr. Wolf alongside Richie West from the Gaycest site. In 2024, he won Best Director All-Sex along with Hottest Cock and Hottest Top at Grabbys America and Most Accomplished International Pornstar at Grabbys Europe. He also earned the Steamworks Fan Favorite Movie award from Grabbys America for "The Ties That Bind" series featuring Cain Marko and Serg Shepard. Additionally, Wolf has been recognized with the GayVN Award for Favorite Daddy for three consecutive year: 2022-2024.

== Personal life ==
In 2009, Legrand married his partner Jay in Massachusetts, one of the states in the USA where same-sex marriage was legal at the time. The couple had initially planned to wed in California, but the passage of Proposition 8, which revoked the right of same-sex couples to marry, prompted them to change their plans.

== Awards and nominations ==
Award	Year	Category	Nominee(s)	Result	Ref.
Fleshbot Awards	2019	Director of the Year	Himself	Nominated	
Fleshbot Awards	2019	Best Cock	Himself	Nominated	
Fleshbot Awards	2019	Best Duo Scene	Dr. Wolf's Office	Won	
Fleshbot Awards	2019	Best Group Sex Scene	Dr Wolf's Private Room 3-Some	Nominated	
Fleshbot Awards	2023	Director of the Year	Himself	Won	
GayVN Awards	2022	Best Fetish Scene	Ian, Chapter 4: Follow-Up Visit	Nominated	
GayVN Awards	2022	Favorite Daddy	Himself	Won	
GayVN Awards	2023	Best Fetish Scene	Fun Pack 10: Morning Wood	Nominated	
GayVN Awards	2023	Favorite Daddy	Himself	Won	
GayVN Awards	2024	Best Directing – Non-Feature	International Scout Boys	Nominated	
GayVN Awards	2024	Best Fetish Scene	International Scout Boys (Chapter 5: Spying on Scoutmaster)	Nominated	
GayVN Awards	2024	Performer of the Year	Himself	Nominated	
GayVN Awards	2024	Favorite Daddy	Himself	Won	
GayVN Awards	2025	Best Directing – Feature	International Transfer	Nominated	
GayVN Awards	2025	Best Screenplay	International Transfer	Nominated	
GayVN Awards	2025	Best Three-Way Sex Scene	Serg's Welcome	Nominated	
GayVN Awards	2025	Best Group Scene	Adam and Eddie's Hungfucker Orgy	Nominated	
GayVN Awards	2026	Best Directing – Feature	Deeper Deep Throat	Nominated	
GayVN Awards	2026	Best Screenplay	Below the Belt	Nominated	
GayVN Awards	2026	Best Supporting Actor	Deeper Deep Throat	Nominated	
GayVN Awards	2026	Favorite Daddy	Himself	Won	
Grabbys Award America	2023	Best Duo	Fun Size Boys	Nominated	
Grabbys Award America	2023	Hottest Daddy	Himself	Nominated	
Grabbys Award America	2023	Hottest Top	Himself	Nominated	
Grabbys Award America	2023	Best All-Sex Movie	Staying at Daddy Wolf’s — Anatomy Lesson	Won	
Grabbys Award America	2023	Performer of the Year	Himself	Won	
Grabbys Award America	2024	Performer of the Year	Himself	Nominated	
Grabbys Award America	2024	Hottest Daddy	Himself	Nominated	
Grabbys Award America	2024	Hottest Body	Himself	Nominated	
Grabbys Award America	2024	Best Actor	The Ties That Bind Us	Nominated	
Grabbys Award America	2024	Best Director - All Sex	International Scout Boys	Won	
Grabbys Award America	2024	Hottest Top	Himself	Won	
Grabbys Award America	2024	Hottest Cock	Himself	Won	
Grabbys Award America	2024	Steamworks Fan Favorite Movie	The Ties That Bind Us	Won	
Grabbys Award America	2025	Hottest Top	Himself	Nominated	
Grabbys Award America	2025	Hottest Cock	Himself	Nominated	
Grabbys Award America	2025	Performer of the Year	Himself	Nominated	
Grabbys Award America	2025	Best Director - Movie/Web Series	Scoutboys	Nominated	
Grabbys Award America	2025	Best 3-Way Scene	Mr. Steele's Exame	Nominated	
Grabbys Award America	2025	Hottest Daddy	Himself	Won	
Grabbys Award America	2025	Best 3-Way Scene	Double Daddies	Won	
Grabbys Award America	2025	Best Screenplay	Internacional Transfer	Won	
Grabbys Award America	2026	Hottest Top	Himself	Nominated	
Grabbys Award America	2026	Hottest Daddy	Himself	Nominated	
Grabbys Award America	2026	Hottest Cock	Himself	Nominated	
Grabbys Award America	2026	Best Actor	Himself	Nominated	
Grabbys Award America	2026	Best Screenplay	Deeper Deep Throat	Nominated	
Grabbys Award America	2026	Perfomer of the Year	Himself	Won	
Grabbys Award America	2026	Best Director Movie/Web Series	Deeper Deep Throat	Won	
Grabbys Award Europe	2024	Social Media Personality	Himself	Nominated	
Grabbys Award Europe	2024	Most Accomplished International Pornstar	Himself	Won	
Grabbys Award Europe	2025	Collaboration of the Year	Legrand Wolf, Cole Blue and Hugo Dupre	Nominated	
Grabbys Award Europe	2025	Pornhub Model of the Year	Himself	Won	
XBIZ Awards	2023	Director of the Year — Gay Movies	Himself	Nominated	
XBIZ Awards	2024	Director of the Year — Gay Movies	Himself	Nominated	
XBIZ Awards	2024	Gay Performer of the Year	Himself	Nominated	
XBIZ Awards	2025	Director of the Year — Gay Works	Himself	Nominated	
XBIZ Awards	2025	Gay Performer of the Year	Himself	Nominated	
XBIZ Awards	2025	Fav Gay Performer	Himself	Won	
XBIZ Awards	2026	Gay Perfomer of the Year	Himself	Nominated	
Pornhub Awards	2024	Most Popular Gay Male Performer	Himself	Nominated	
Pornhub Awards	2024	Top Daddy Performer	Himself	Nominated	
Pornhub Awards	2025	Most Popular Gay Male Performer	Himself	Nominated	
Pornhub Awards	2025	Top Daddy Performer	Himself	Nominated	
International Content Creator Awards	2026	Favorite Daddy	Himself	Won	
