= Cade Maddox =

American gay pornographic actor

- Born: Jared Wayne Fagan; March 7, 1988 (age 38); Gautier, Mississippi, U.S.
- Years active: 2017–present
- Height: 6 ft 1 in (185 cm)
- Website: cademaddox.com

Cade Maddox (born Jared Wayne Fagan; March 7, 1988) is an American gay pornographic film actor. He is strictly a top, and has been one of the most viewed gay porn stars on Pornhub from 2023 to 2025.

== Early and personal life ==
Fagan was born in Gautier, Mississippi, and grew up in a conservative, religious household.

Talking about his early life, he said in an interview that he hated it. His mother was very religious; and since other than sports there were no extracurricular activities in the small town he lived in, he had to go to church twice a week on Sunday and Wednesday. He was raised with the belief that homosexuality was wrong, so when he was discovering his identity in his early years, he had to suppress it to conform.

At 18 years old, he was outed by his sisters to their mom after they saw his messages to a boy in his MySpace account. When she asked about it, he replied that he was bisexual, because he thought it was easier to say that at the time, since he had a girlfriend and hadn't had same-sex relations.

He described himself as a "nerdy kid" in high school before he hit puberty. But then he became popular, and was on Homecoming Court and crowned Most Handsome in his senior year of high school.

He had a scholarship for soccer and played for a few years, but unsure of what he wanted to do in college, he kept changing his major. Then he met his now ex-husband and moved to Hawaii with him, where he lived for three years until their divorce.

Cade dated fellow porn star Max Adonis for about a year, with whom he had shot his very first scene for CockyBoys. Since 2019, he has been in a relationship with Québécois model Kevin Benoit.

In 2019, he legally changed his name from "Jared Wayne Fagan" to "Cade Maddox".

== Career ==
Cade's first job was at a veterinarian's office. He then worked retail, in the food industry, and also went to trade school for cosmetology since he wanted to be a barber. He got a divorce right before he finished and graduated there. He had also worked as a model during his time in Hawaii.

In 2017, he was visiting his mom in Cincinnati (she had moved to Ohio from Mississippi), when he met Jason Sparks of JasonSparksLive.com on Grindr, who took his audition in a hotel room— released as a scene titled “Cade Maddox and Spencer Daley Bareback in Cincinnati”. Maddox joined Sparks' "Nationwide Bareback Road Trip", traveling with him for about six months, and filming with guys in hotel rooms all over the country.

After about six months in, Maddox was approached by Men.com. He then ventured out on his own, and during a six-month stint in Washington, D.C., befriended Billy Santoro. Billy took him under his wing— he did an interview with him on his site, and filmed together for OnlyFans; after which other studios noticed him too. He started getting a lot of work and moved to Los Angeles.

In 2019, Maddox became a Falcon Studios Exclusive, renewing the contract in 2021. He was introduced as a Fleshjack Boy in 2021; and in 2022, he partnered with PinstripeCash to launch his official membership site CadeMaddox.com. In 2024, he signed an exclusive contract with Men.com.

Maddox won "Performer of the Year" at the 2020 GayVN Awards, which he considers to be the highlight of his career, as it was the first time he got a lot of recognition for all of his hard work. He hosted the 2024 GayVN Awards with Alec Mapa, and in the 2025 edition won the most number of awards in the fan-voted categories.

According to Pornhub's Year in Review, Maddox was the 3rd most searched for gay porn star on Pornhub in 2023, and the 4th most viewed in 2024. He was also one of the most viewed gay porn stars as per the Pride Insights report for 2025 published by Pornhub in celebration of Pride Month.

== Awards and nominations ==
Year	Award	Nomination	Work	Result	Ref.
2019	Grabby Awards	Hottest Top		Won	
2020	GayVN Awards	Performer of the Year		Won	
2020	Fleshbot Awards	Performer of the Year		Nominated	
2022	GayVN Awards	Favorite Cock		Won	
2022	GayVN Awards	Favorite Body		Won	
2023	GayVN Awards	Favorite Cock		Won	
2023	GayVN Awards	Favorite Porn Star Creator		Won	
2023	Pornhub Awards	Most Popular Gay Male Performer		Won	
2024	Pornhub Awards	Most Popular Gay Male Performer		Won	
2024	GayVN Awards	Favorite Body		Won	
2024	GayVN Awards	Favorite Top		Won	
2025	GayVN Awards	Favorite Cock		Won	
2025	GayVN Awards	Favorite Body		Won	
2025	GayVN Awards	Favorite Top		Won	
2025	GayVN Awards	Best Duo Sex Scene	The Last Ride (Part 1) (with Damian Knight), Men.com	Nominated	
