= Rentboy.com =

Social networking website for male sex workers

rentboy.com
- Launched: January 18, 1996; 30 years ago
- Current status: Not operational

Hustlaball in KitKatClub, Berlin

Rentboy.com was a commercial social networking site that connected male sex workers and masseurs with potential clients. Rentboy.com was also the major organizer of the International Escort Awards and a traveling cabaret called "Hustlaball."

At one time Rentboy.com had published a manifesto on their website intended for sex workers and clients. This statement promoted a philosophy of "safer sex because the vast majority of sex-workers will not engage in unsafe sex." It stated, "while this job may not be for everyone, it has its rightful place among honorable careers." On August 25, 2015, CEO Jeffrey Hurant - also known as "Jeffrey Davids" - and six others were arrested at Rentboy.com headquarters and charged with conspiring to violate the Travel Act by promoting prostitution.

== Company profile ==
In 1997, Jeffrey Hurrant started Rentboy.com, the first male escorting website. From its founding, Hurant served as CEO and Sean Van Sant served as company director. The company was headquartered in Manhattan. According to Van Sant,

"Rentboy.com is not an escort agency. We are an ad listing service for male escorts, where men place their own ads and work for themselves, so that clients can contact them directly. Our mission is to create a non-judgmental space where anyone curious about exploring male-male companionship can hire a man by the hour."

As of June 2009, Rentboy.com was employing 10 people in three offices and hosted 40,000 escort profiles. In 2009, 1.4 million clients visited the website.

On August 25, 2015, Federal agents from the Department of Homeland Security and members of the New York Police Department raided Rentboy.com's headquarters.

== Sponsorships ==
Rentboy.com sponsored its own float every year in the New York City Gay Pride March.

=== International Escort Awards ===
The International Escort Awards, also known as the "Hookies," were founded by Rentboy.com's Jeff Hurant and Sean Van Sant. The first ceremony was held at the Roxy in New York City in October 2006.

=== Hustlaball ===
Hustlaball was a sex cabaret and dance party organized in part by rentboy.com intended to destigmatize and honor sex workers. Starting in 2007, Rentboy.com hosted Hustlaball three times each year, with a Las Vegas show in January, a London show in May, and a Berlin show in October. Part of the proceeds from this event went to charities such as the Lambeth Hate Crime Initiative, the Terrence Higgins Trust, and the Gay Men's Health Crisis.

==== History ====
Founder Jeffrey Hurant said of Hustlaball, "This is a chance for sex workers to be open and proud of what they do."

Summary of Hustlaball Events
year	location	venue	publicized attendees	notes
1998	Midtown Manhattan, New York City	Stella's Nightclub		founding of event
1999	New York City	Lure Nightclub		
2000	San Francisco, Chicago	Pleasuredome, San Francisco		
2001	New York City			changed name from "Hustler Ball" to "Hustlaball" because of a lawsuit initiated by Larry Flynt due to similarity of name to Hustler Magazine
2002	New York City, West Hollywood (Los Angeles)	Factory nightclub, Los Angeles	Christopher Ciccone	
2003	Berlin	KitKatClub, Berlin		first time outside US Hustlaball in Berlin
2004	Berlin	KitKatClub, Berlin		attendance doubled from previous year Hustlaball in Berlin
2005	Berlin, Las Vegas	KitKatClub, Berlin	Gioia Bruno, Chi Chi LaRue, Lady Bunny, Matthew Rush, Jeff Stryker, Michael Lucas	held in conjunction with AVN Award Ceremony Hustlaball in Berlin
2006	Berlin, Las Vegas	KitKatClub, Berlin	Ari Gold, Marc Almond	show professionally video recorded and released Hustlaball in Berlin
2007	Berlin, New York City, Las Vegas	KitKatClub, Berlin	Britney Spears	Hustlaball in Berlin
2008	Berlin, London, Las Vegas	KitKatClub, Berlin	Willam Belli, Jonny McGovern	Hustlaball in Berlin
2009	Berlin, London, New York City	The Old Mint (Münze), Berlin		Hustlaball in Berlin
2010	Berlin	KitKatClub, Berlin		Hustlaball in Berlin
2011	Berlin	KitKatClub, Berlin		Hustlaball in Berlin
2014	Berlin, New York City, Las Vegas	KitKatClub, Berlin		
2015	Berlin, New York City, Las Vegas	KitKatClub, Berlin	Britney Spears	
2016	Berlin, Las Vegas	KitKatClub, Berlin		

== Federal and state investigation ==
On August 25, 2015, DHS and NYPD agents raided the Manhattan headquarters of Rentboy.com as part of a money laundering and state prostitution investigation. Seven people, including CEO Jeffrey Davids, were arrested. "As alleged, Rentboy.com attempted to present a veneer of legality, when in fact this Internet brothel made millions of dollars from the promotion of illegal prostitution," acting U.S. Attorney for the Eastern District of New York Kelly Currie said in a statement. DHS was involved in the raid in part because the investigation involved transferring money across state lines. The seven defendants were charged with conspiring to violate the Travel Act by promoting prostitution.

On October 7, 2016, ex-CEO Hurant pleaded guilty in federal court of promoting prostitution. In August 2017 Hurant was sentenced to 6 months in federal prison. While the case had prompted allegations of anti-gay bias, U.S. Immigration and Customs Enforcement stated that "any insinuation that a specific population was targeted is categorically false."

== See also ==
- George Alan Rekers
