= Steven Scarborough =

American pornographic film director

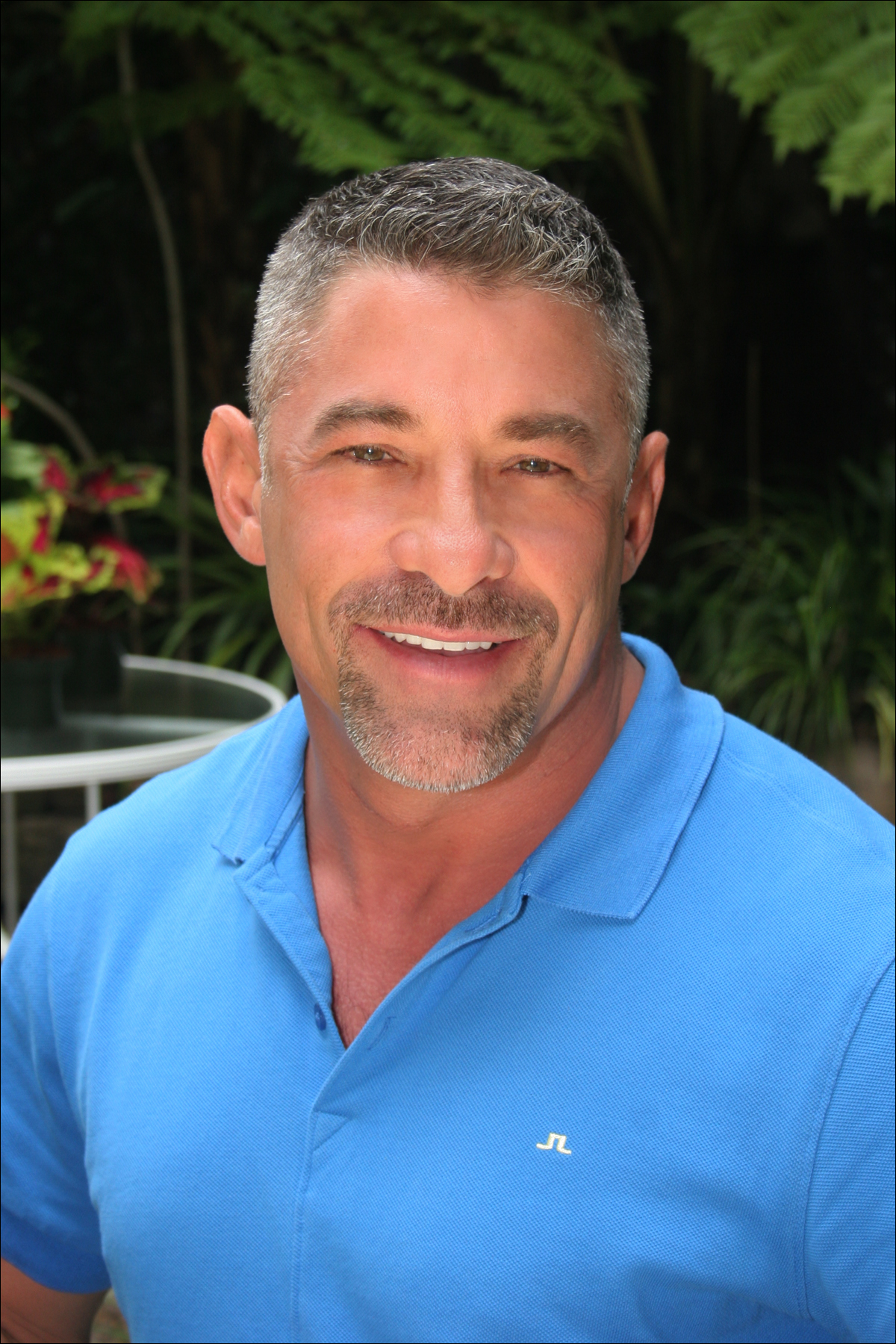
- Scarborough in January 2007
- Born: June 23, 1953 (age 71)
- Occupation: Film director
- Known for: Founder of Hot House Entertainment
- Spouse: Brent Smith

Steven Scarborough (born June 23, 1953) is an American gay pornographic film director, the founder of Hot House Entertainment (1993), and he was an Executive Vice-President and director for Falcon Studios from 1987 to 1993.

== Career ==
In 1974, Scarborough came to San Francisco. He opened up a health food store on Castro Street opposite Harvey Milk's camera shop. He later met Dick Fisk (a local sales clerk), who was also a porn star in The Other Side of Aspen (1977), a very successful Falcon Studios gay pornographic film. Then he was introduced to Chuck Holmes, they soon became friends.

Scarborough debuted as a director in the summer of 1988 with the Falcon Studios Perfect Summer at the behest of his life partner Chuck Holmes. Scarborough established that the studio would refrain from condom-less films in support of the safe sex condom-use philosophy.

== Awards ==
Scarborough was inducted into the GayVN Hall Of Fame in 2002.

- 1996 Gay Erotic Video Award Best Special Interest Video – Call To Arms
- 1999 "Grabby" Award Best Fetish Video – Batter Up!
- 2001 Free Speech Coalition – Lifetime Achievement Award – Steven Scarborough
- 2002 GayVN Award Hall of Fame Inductee – Steven Scarborough
- 2004 GayVN Award Best Speciality Tape – Mo' Bubble Butt
- 2004 GayVN Award Best Leather Video – Skuff II
- 2004 "Grabby" Award Hall of Fame Inductee – Steven Scarborough
- 2005 "Grabby" Award Best Classic Release – The Road To Hopeful
- 2005 "Grabby" Award Best Duo Sex Scene – Tag Adams and Aiden Shaw in Perfect Fit
- 2005 FICEB "HeatGay" Award – Best Gay Picture (Skuff 3)
- 2006 GayVN Award Best Leather Video – The Missing
- 2006 "Grabby" Award Best Fetish Video – Twisted
- 2006 "Grabby" Award Best Leather Video – The Missing
- 2006 "Grabby" Award Hottest Cum Scene – Marco Paris in The Missing
- 2006 Maleflixxx Gold VOD Award Top 10 VOD – Justice
- 2006 Maleflixxx Gold VOD Award Top 10 VOD – Trunks 2
- 2006 Hard Choice Awards Best Director – Steven Scarborough for Justice, Black -N- Blue & Trunks 2
- 2006 FICEB "HeatGay" Award – Best Director (The Missing – Hot House Entertainment)
- 2007 GayVN Award Best Leather Video – Black -N- Blue
- 2007 GayVN Award Best All-Sex Video – Black -N- Blue
- 2007 GayVN Award Best Oral Scene – Ty Hudson and Shane Rollins in Justice
- 2007 "Grabby" Award Best Director – Steven Scarborough for Justice
- 2007 "Grabby" Award Best Video – Justice
- 2007 "Grabby" Award Best Actor – Shane Rollins in Justice
- 2007 "Grabby" Award Best Leather Video – Black -N- Blue
- 2007 "Grabby" Award Best Solo Sex Scene – Kent North in At Your Service
- 2007 "Grabby" Award Best Duo Sex Scene – Shane Rollins and Trevor Knight in Justice
- 2007 "Grabby" Award Best Versatile Performer – Hot House Exclusive Francesco D'Macho
- 2007 "Grabby" Award Maleflixxx People's Choice Award – Justice
- 2007 David Award Best American Performer – Hot House Exclusive Trunks 3, Full Throttle, Communion and Jockstrap!
- 2007 Maleflixxx Gold VOD Award Top 10 VOD – Butch Alley
- 2007 Maleflixxx Gold VOD Award Top 10 VOD – Private Lowlife
- 2008 CyberSocket Award Best Video Company Website – HotHouse.com
- 2008 XBIZ Award GLBT Lifetime Achievement Award – Steven Scarborough
- 2008 European Gay Porn Awards Best Non-European Movie – Communion
- 2008 European Gay Porn Awards Best Non-European Studio – Hot House Entertainment
- 2008 "Grabby" Award Best Leather Video – Verboten Parts 1 & 2
- 2008 "Grabby" Award Best Art Direction – Verboten Parts 1 & 2
- 2008 "Grabby" Award Best Cum Scene – Francesco D’Macho and Romario Faria in Verboten Part 2
- 2008 "Grabby" Award Wall of Fame Inductee – Brent Smith
- 2008 "Grabby" Award Wall of Fame Inductee – Hot House Lifetime Exclusive Kent North
- 2009 CyberSocket Award Best Video Company Website – HotHouse.com
- 2009 GayVN Award Best Leather Video – Verboten Parts 1 & 2
- 2009 GayVN Award Best Sex Comedy Video – Paging Dr. Finger
- 2009 "Grabby" Award Lifetime Achievement Award – Steven Scarborough
- 2009 "Grabby" Award Best Newcomer – Kyle King
- 2009 "Grabby" Award Best Sex Comedy – Paging Dr. Finger
- 2009 "Grabby" Award Maleflixxx People's Choice Award – Jockstrap
- 2010 XBIZ Award Gay Movie Director of the Year

== See also ==
- List of male performers in gay porn films
