= First humans in Slavic mythology =

Anthropogenic myths are a complex of myths of Slavic peoples about the origin, creation of man. The original pagan mythological narrative has not survived, and the established anthropogenic myths in folklore largely repeat the biblical myth of the creation of man. At the same time, reconstruction of Slavic mythology is possible.

== Man from the earth ==
In Southern Slavs, the folkloric view that the first people grew out of the earth like mushrooms has been preserved. The largest number of attestations, at least 13, come from northwestern Bulgaria, written down between 1988 and 1999, and one from Macedonia. An excerpt from an ethnographic record made in the village of Leskovets in 1989:

Adam and Eve once rose from mushrooms and created this world. From mushrooms, from the earth... They grew like mushrooms. And from these two mushrooms – one boy and one girl... And a nation began to grow... And from grandma Eve and grandpa Adam are these children. And the nation begins to grow: today, tomorrow and tomorrow – and grows... From mushrooms. That's what I heard, that from mushrooms, from the ground they germinated – a generation is formed forever. (Note: Original: Адам и Ева некоги од гъби са никнали и създали тоа свет. Од гъбите, од земята... Они са никнали като гъбици. И от тия двете гъбици – едно момче и едно момиче... И се създават народ. Народ се създава. Родат се деца. И от буба Ева и деда Адам са тия деца. И почва народо да расте: днеска утре, и утре – и се нараства... От гъби. Така съм чула, че од гъби, вечек од земята като никнали – оно се създава вечек поколение.)

Other excerpt:

... man was created from a mushroom. Two mushrooms grew. And one was a man and one was a woman, and then they created a generation. And they established a village between two mountains. The village was established and [...] world created. From generation to generation... They grew out of the ground, out of the bottom. Man – from mushroom. So our grandmother told us that man was created from mushrooms. (Note: Original: ... човека е се създал од гъба. Пораснали две гъби. И била една мъжка, една женска. И после създали поколение. И си заправили там между две планине си заправили селце. Село си запраили и така, така, така – се създал света. От поколение на поколение... По ливадите, по ливадите... Из земята никнале отдоле. Човека – од гъба. Така ни е казувала баба, че човека е се създал от гъби.)

There are also variants that speak of the creation of giants, dwarves and humans. The first one comes from Bulgaria, and according to it, the first generation of humans were velikans (giants), who grew like mushrooms and became extinct; the second generation were pedyamazhe (dwarves), who had long beards and became extinct; then a third generation appeared, created by God, of medium height. A similar myth was attested to in Macedonia, where God ordered humans to appear, who grew out of the ground like mushrooms, and were velikans, but were exterminated by God. He then created dwarfs, span in height, beards in ell, but they also became extinct. Finally, he created modern humans, of average height. These accounts have been influenced by biblical anthropogony and contain additional elements to older messages.

A West Slavic account is the 1875 text Can God be Denied? by Jan Podlaha, a Czech writer and pastor from the village of Stálce near the town of Tábor, which was a polemic against the evolution proposed by Charles Darwin. Excerpt:

So where did man come from...? Did he grow out of the ground like a mushroom after a warm rain, or did he come out of the ground to the surface...? That couldn't have happened and certainly didn't happen, because even now people would have to grow out of the ground... Besides, if even the first humans could have grown, how could the forces of nature have known that man and woman would be needed for human reproduction, and that they would therefore throw man and woman out of the ground and give them the ability to reproduce? Even non-believers no longer believe that people will grow out of the ground.

Ethnographic sources from the 19th century make no mention of such accounts, so Podlaha did not rely on texts by ethnologists, but on colloquial knowledge, based on what was believed in the Czech province in the 19th century. According to Łuczyński, this is to be proved by the participle no longer, which suggests that the belief of growing out of the ground like a mushroom circulated among some of his parishioners until recently.

An East Slavic attestation of this myth can be found in an excerpt from the novel Proty syly ne popresh; z chym rodyvsya, z tym i vmresh, by the 19th century Ukrainian writer Anatoly Svydnytsky. Excerpt:

– I'm the one, you say, who grew out of the ground like a mushroom, and you have a mother hmmm! – mother... And do the rest of the boys have a mother? – They have one too – replied the boy.
[...]
So he did, and believed that the pany grow out of the ground like mushrooms, but the people do not – they have some mother beforehand. And she takes them somewhere, so that the pany have someone to serve them.

Although this myth appears in literary fiction, it is of folk origin; Svydnytsky, in addition to being a writer, was also a folklorist and probably refers to an unknown folk tradition. According to Michał Łuczyński, the word pany here refers to Poles, and the text may be ridiculing, humorous or ironic, and depicts Poles as orphans, i.e., people without mothers, implying their inferior origin.

A possible Belarusian attestation is the legend of the origin of the Belarusians recorded in Latvia: "And the woods, and the grasses, and the animals, and the fish, and then there appeared also a man: did he come from somewhere, or did he grow up here". (Note: Original: І лясы, і травы, і звяры, і рыбы, а пасля чалавек завёўся: ці ён прыйшоў адкуль ці вырас тутака.)

According to Łuczyński, this anthropogenic myth is basic one and it existed in Proto-Slavs. The motif itself (A1234 in Motif-Index of Folk-Literature) widespread among various peoples of the world, and especially among Indo-Europeans, such as the Indo-Iranians, the Armenians, the Greeks (in Arcadia, Attica, Boeotia), the Pelasgians and the Germanic peoples. On the basis of other Indo-European attestations, Łuczyński concludes that the myth of mankind growing out of the earth is of Proto-Indo-European origin. Thus, he reconstructs the Proto-Indo-European semantics of "(first) man grows out of the earth," "people (are born) like plants (vegetables in the Greek tradition, rhubarb in the Persian tradition)". The Slavic variant would differ from other Indo-European traditions in that humans grew like mushrooms, not vegetables, indicating the forest environment in which the myth was transformed. He also reconstructs Slavic motifs as follows: humans rise from the earth → the first human couple → the first human couple lives in innocence → incest of brother and sister → offspring of the first parents, although not all of these motifs have been attested to in Slavic folklore.

The given names of the first people in Slavic mythology have not been preserved. For Proto-Indo-European mythology, the name *Ym̥Hós is reconstructed, which would give the Slavic male name Im, while the female partner would be called Ima (*Jьmъ).

== Man from the different parts of the world ==
In the apocrypha The Story of God's Creation of Adam, the first man is described as having been created from eight parts of the world: flesh from earth, bones from stone, blood from sea, eyes from sun, thoughts from cloud, "light from light," breath from wind, heat from fire. The Dove Book tells a similar story: mind from Christ, thoughts from clouds, "world-people" from Adam, bones from stone, flesh from earth, blood from sea water. Such an apocryphal story is common among Russians and Bulgarians and has classical or Proto-Indo-European roots. According to the Proto-Indo-European myth, the world was created by the dismemberment of a divine anthropomorphic creature or bull.

== Man from the sweat ==
The earliest anthropogonic myth is contained in the record of the Primary Chronicle under the year 1071, where it is told by the rebellious volkhvs. The uprising itself is dated to late 1073 – early 1074 or autumn of 1076. According to the Chronicle, the two volkhvs appeared at a time of bad harvests and famine, announcing to the people that they knew the causes of the disasters. After arriving at large settlements with administrative functions, pogosts, they performed special rituals. They claimed that the "best women" hide bread, honey, fish and furs. People would bring their sisters, wives and mothers to them, and the volkhvs would kill them by making an incision behind the shoulder and literally taking the desired supplies out of their bodies. So they gathered 300 people around them and headed down two rivers to Byelaazyorsk. In Byelaazyorsk there was a skirmish between the followers of the volkhvs and a detachment of Yan Vyshatich, a protégé of Prince Sviatoslav Yaroslavich, who was collecting tribute there. During the skirmish, a priest was killed in the detachment, and Yan Vyshatich ordered the capture of the volkhvs. Having captured the volkhvs, Yan tries to find out who they are and why they killed so many people. They replied that the result would be abundance, because those killed were hiding supplies, which the volkhvs wanted to demonstrate. Yan replies that this is a lie and that there is nothing in man but bones and veins, and that God created man from the earth. Volkhvs answer:

"We know how man was created". And he asked: "How?" The two of them said: "God was washing in a bathhouse, and he began to sweat, and he wiped himself with a cloth of herbs, and he threw it from heaven down to earth. And Satan began to argue with God about who would create man from it (the cloth). And the devil created man, but God put the soul in him. That is why, when a man dies, his body goes to earth and his soul to God". Yan said to them: "In truth you have been inveigled by a demon. Which god do you believe in?" They said: "In the Antichrist". And he asked them: "Where is he?" They answered: "He lives in the abyss". Yan said to them: "What god is that who lives in the abyss? That is a demon; God is in heaven seated on his throne, honoured by the angels, who are before Him in fear and are unable to gaze on Him [...]"

The chronicler's account goes directly back to the story of Yan Vyshatich. The rebellion is similar to the Suzdal uprising, described in the chronicle under the year 1024, when the volkhvs were confronted by "old tcheliad" who "hold an abundance." Scholars suggest several possible sources for the depictions of the volkhvs: traditional paganism, Christian preaching transformed in the minds of the Rus' people, or the Bogomil heresy brought to Rus' from Bulgaria.

Some researchers favor the opinion that the revolt took place in a Finno-Ugric or mixed society, and that the volkhvs were of Finno-Ugric origin or succumbed to the influence of Finno-Ugric mythology. The rebellion itself took place in the Rostov principality in the north of Rus', near the Finno-Ugric peoples. The idea of the Finno-Ugric origin of the volkhvs emerged in the first half of the 19th century, especially after the publication of Ocherki Mordvy by ethnographer Pavel Melnikov, after which most scholars began to support the Finno-Ugric version. In Ocherki, Melnikov noted the following ritual of the Mordvins: special gatherers went around the houses in the Mordvin village, and on the threshold of the houses they met women naked from the waist up, who, turning their backs to them, threw bags with various snacks over their shoulders. The gatherers cut open the bags with knives and stabbed the women five times in the back while saying prayers. They then took the bags of supplies away. The procedure described by Melnikov strongly resembles an excerpt from the Chronicle. Melnikov also recorded a Mordvinian anthropogonic myth: Satan thought of creating a human being and used clay, sand and earth from seventy-seven countries for this purpose, but he could not give a human being the necessary image, forming the shapes of various animals from the material. He then said to the mouse-bird: fly to the baths of Cham-Pas in Heaven. There on a nail hangs a towel with which he wipes himself in the banya. Make a nest at one end of the towel so that it falls off. The bird-mouse did just that. It made a nest and laid eggs in it, from which the chicks hatched. The towel became heavy at one end and fell to Earth. Satan picked up the towel and wiped the man with it, who took the form of the God. Satan wanted to revive the man, but couldn't. Then Cham-Pas came and told him to get out and wanted to revive the man himself. But Satan began to resist because he had created a body. They began to argue and Cham-Pas suggested to divide the man. The soul that Cham-Pas would place would go to him after the man died, and the body would go to Satan on earth. Since Czam-Pas was stronger than Satan, the latter finally agreed.

Folklorist Aleksandr Afanasyev was critical of the idea of the Finno-Ugric origin of the volkhvs and their myths. From his point of view, the volkhvs appeared in the north as a result of the fact that pagan beliefs were still alive in this area, far from the center of Christianity, Kyiv. He also questioned the coincidence with the ritual described by Melnikov: in the Mordovian ritual, stabbing was only a symbolic action, while the chronicle speaks of real violence against women. According to philologist Igor Bessonov, the Mordovian myth can only indicate the reliability of the information contained in the Chronicle, but cannot be an argument for non-Slavic origin.

In 1861, historian Afanasy Shchapov was probably the first to propose the thesis that the beliefs of the volkhvs reflected dualistic religious beliefs such as Gnosticism, Manichaeism and Bogomilism. Shchapov directly linked the Bogomil myth to the anthropogonic myth of the Chronicles, which appeared in connection with the spread of apocrypha in the Rus'. Later researchers have repeatedly referred to this thesis, declaring that the volkhvs were influenced by bogomils or were themselves bogomils. According to the Bogomilian view described in the Panoplia of the late 11th – early 12th century Byzantine theologian and exegete Euthymios Zigabenos, the material world is the work of another god – the god of evil, as opposed to the spiritual world created by the good God. According to this doctrine, Satan created Adam, but could not bring him to life. He then created a serpent out of leftover moisture and air, who went to God and asked him to revive Adam. Satan promises that man will belong to both of them, and God breathes life into him, which explains the duality of human nature.

Later, the simultaneous association of the legend told by the volkhvs with Bogomilism and Mordovian folklore put researchers in a difficult position. Historian Vladimir Petrukhin believes that the Finno-Ugric similarities do not invalidate the conclusion that medieval dualist heresies influenced the early medieval Slavic worldview. A radical point of view was expressed by historian Mikhail Braychevski, who argued that the volkhvs were never pagans, and their statements show traces of the influence of Bogomilism and Paulicianism. Literary scholar Alexander Veselovsky believed that the Bogomils merely updated the Finno-Ugric myth. In contrast to the Bogomil depiction of the creation of man from earth and water, the Chronicle's description includes the motif of creation from a rag or bath towel, which is unusual for them. As a possible Christian parallel to the idea of a rag, Veselovsky and historian-archivist Fedor Ryazanovski cite a reference from the apocrypha Scroll of Divine Books circulated in Russia, where it is said that the sun was created from the Holy Robe, which God wiped himself in the morning. Ryazanovsky expressed the opinion that all the commentaries of the volkhvs could have been invented by the chronicler on the basis of Byzantine literary tradition, since the chronicler himself did not indulge in paganism. This position has been repeatedly expressed in the scholarly literature. Bessonov, given the ethnographic evidence of the Mordvins, considers such an idea extremely unlikely. Historian Dimitri Obolensky divided the anthropological story into two myths: the first, about the creation of man, which has a Bogomil origin, and the second, about a rag or towel that became a tool for the creation of man. Bessonov agrees with this division. The researcher believes that both stories go back to the religious traditions of Byzantine Empire and Bulgaria. He believes that the basis of the myth in the Chronicle was the Pauline myth of the creation of man, reworked by folk Christianity: the Demiurge, along with the fallen angels, saw the radiant image and likeness of the Heavenly Father and, struck by this beauty, wanted to create his likeness. This is how man was created. But he was weak, could not stand on his feet and crawled like a worm. The Heavenly Father took pity on man and gave him the spark of life. Then he became complete. Bessonov recognizes the towel as a folk reinterpretation of the Mandylion. Thus, according to The Tale of the Image Not Made by Hands, Christ's face was imprinted on the towel when Jesus wiped off his sweat while praying in the Gethsemane. The washing in the bathtub probably derives from another version of the legend, according to which Christ washed himself with water and then wiped himself with a wimple. Melnikov's version of the legend says that Satan gave man "the image and likeness of God," hence the towel contained this image. This correlates with Byzantine and Slavic writings, in which the Mandylion is called the image and likeness of Jesus Christ. Wiping a person with a towel may be a reworking of the legend of Abgar V, who was healed when he applied the Mandylion to his body. As a result, Bessonov characterizes the volkhvs' view as a complex mixture of Paulician belief, folk orthodoxy and paganism. The volkhvs themselves were involved only in the search for witches, and their clash with Yan Vyshatich was merely an administrative collision. Philologist Yevgeny Anichkov believed that the worldview of the volkhvs was based on Finno-Ugric beliefs, and that the chronicler knew more about the volkhvs than he reported. The chronicler, having begun to tell about the Finno-Ugric representations, suddenly "interrupts abruptly, having clearly remembered that such things should not be reported, and ends the story of the Bogomol type." As a result, under the chronicler's pen, the volkhvs turn out to be unrealistic bogomils, worshipping the Antichrist and Satan, the kind their Orthodox opponents needed. The reason for such an imaginary portrayal of the volkhvs, Anichkov saw in the chronicler's misunderstanding of 11th-century paganism, while about Christian heretics one knew what to say and how to say it.

The myth of the Primary Chronicle is itself dualistic. Accordingly, Afanasyev, later supported by M. Nikiforovsky, declared that the myth is Slavic, and under the names of God and Satan are Belobog and Chernobog, respectively. However, dualism is not characteristic of Slavic religion, and the existence of these Slavic gods has been questioned.

Writer Nikolai Polevoy recognized Scandinavian influences in the myth. Thus, the Scandinavian anthropogonic myth told the story of how the first humans appeared from the sweat of the giant Ymir. However, Aleksandr Karpov stresses the incorrectness of the comparisons. From the sweat of Ymir appeared the jötunns, and humans emerged from trees thrown on the seashore.

To prove the Slavic origin of the myth, Afanasyev cited a similar folk tale from a Serbian fable published by folklorist Karel Jaromír Erben, that God walked in the white world, reached the earth, sweated from fatigue, and a drop of divine sweat fell to the ground, came to life and formed the first man. The idea that the sweat of a sacred being gives life is also present among Bulgarians. According to their beliefs, bees appeared from the sweat of Christ. Historian Igor Danilevski notes that another myth similar to that of the Chronicle is the Old East Slavic Word about the blowing of the spirit into man from the 12th-13th centuries, preserved as a copy from the late 15th – early 16th century. Excerpt:

The Almighty, alone immortal and ageless, Creator of the imperishable, draws his immortal breath. For He "breathed into him [man] the spirit of life, and thus man became a living soul." It was not your Rod, sitting in the air throwing clods of earth to the ground from which children spring and yet: angels bear up the soul [after death], or else: for others people or the angels God shall render judgement, as some heretics preach from the books of the Saracens and the accursed Bulgarians. For God, not Rod, is the Creator of all.

Afanasyev brought Rod close to Perun and interpreted the word clods as "stones." The researcher concluded that the myth as recorded in the Word originally was as follows: Perun beats the rocks with a hammer, and giants are formed from the shards of stones. Afanasyev's hypothesis regarding the Slavic context of the events of the revolt, the myth of Perun and the sweating god did not live to see further consistent development. Archaeologist Boris Rybakov believed that the word clods meant "raindrops," with which archaeologist Leo Klejn agreed. The mention of Bulgarians in the text may indicate the Bogomil origin of the condemned depictions.

== Later biblical motives ==
In Slavic folklore, especially among Eastern Slavs, the most widespread are the anthropogonic myths, which go directly back to the biblical myth of the creation of man from earth and clay. At the same time, the motif of Satan's participation in the creation of man is more popular among Eastern Slavs than the very presence of God. Thus, in Russian legends, Satan claims authority over man because he was created from earth, which he took from the bottom of the ocean. Bulgarian legends claim that God created man from earth mixed with his saliva. It is from this saliva that sperm comes. Another Bulgarian legend says that God created humans the way a potter creates pots. After lunch, God saw that the work was going slowly and hurriedly began to mold people, making them lame, sickly, proud, stubborn, etc. In a Ukrainian myth, God molded a man's penis from a piece of clay to drive him out of paradise.

The myth, recorded in Russia and Bulgaria, says that God created man from clay and went to heaven to get his soul, leaving a dog, which has no skin yet, as a guardian. During this time, Satan tempts the dog with skin or bread and then spits on the man. Upon his return, God turns the man inside out, and because of the spitting on his insides, the man becomes susceptible to disease. According to other versions, the devil pierced the man with a finger or an awl so that the soul would not be retained inside him. God plugged all the holes with herbs, which became medicinal, except for one, from which the soul comes out after death (Bulgaria). In another version, Satan poked the man with a stick and let in 70 ailments. The first man, Adam, is depicted in the Bulgarian and Old Rus' apocrypha The Story of the Cross Tree as a giant who could fit 300 men. In Ukrainian legend, the first humans were giants who left footprints on stones (sledoviks – petroglyph in the shape of a human foot). After fall of man, the stones were pressed into the feet, hence man has a hole on them. Another legend says that Satan decided to create man in the likeness of God, but was given a wolf. God revived the wolf, and the wolf bit the devil. Since then, devils have gone limp. In an Irkutsk legend, Satan forms a statue of a man from the ground using saliva, but cannot make him stand up. God anointed the creature's mouth with saliva and breathed the spirit into the man, and the man came to life.

For the most part, the myth of the creation of woman repeats the biblical myth of the creation of Eve from Adam's rib. Also, in many anthropological legends, clay is replaced by dough and a failed attempt to create a human from it. Thus, in a Russian legend, God created Eve from dough, but she was eaten by a dog because Archangel Michael, guarding the drying bodies of humans, looked at something else. Then Eve was created from a flower, but Adam protested and wanted a wife like him. Then God took a rib close to Adam's heart so that the new Eve would love her husband. He took out the rib and put it near a tree to dry. A dog ran by and started chewing on the bone. God took the bone and created Eve. In another version, the devil appears instead of the dog and runs away from God, but God catches up with him and grabs his tail, tearing it off. God mistook the tail for a rib, and the devil escaped with the rib. From the devil's tail God created Eve, so all women are cunning and devils are crafty. In another version, God created Eve from a dog's tail, so women talk so much because they wag their tongues like a dog's tail (Sout and East). In a Ukrainian legend, Adam was created from dough, but was eaten by a dog. Adam was then formed from clay.

There is also a folk belief that man and woman were originally united, but Satan tore off the woman so that only part of the genitals remained in both. Since then, people have been striving to reunite, from which children are born.

A West Ukrainian legend says that God cursed Eve to give birth in agony, and after death she carried the eggs of as many people as were born on the earth. God cut the eggs in half and threw them on the ground: boys were born from one half and girls from the other. Some halves of the first people fell into a swamp or ravine and died there. That's why some people are lonely.

In Slavic folk culture, laryngeal prominence is called Adam's apple, the forbidden fruit that Adam swallowed. It got stuck in his throat, forming a laryngeal prominence. Eve, after swallowing the fruit, felt attracted to Satan. From the union with Satan was born Cain, from the union with Adam was born Abel. As a result, all idolaters are descended from Cain. According to another version, from union with Satan is born an offspring with twelve or seven heads, only one of which is human, and the rest are animal. Satan promises Adam to eat the extra heads if he gives him all his earthly offspring.

One of the popular folklore motifs among the Slavs is that of the callused skin of the people that covered them before the fall. Thus, in a Russian legend, after the callused skin falls off, Adam asks to leave some of the eternal skin on his fingers as a reminder of his lost immortality. In one Bulgarian variant, Adam and Eve were covered with hair before the fall. A similar tale of callused skin is common among the Baltic peoples. Historian Sergey Alekseev believes that this folk motif is of Proto-Slavic origin and was originally understood to mean that skin protected people, but did not allow reproduction, and because of the desire to leave offspring, people lost their defenses. This myth may have been borrowed by the Balto-Slavs from the east, from peoples of the Uralic family, which is widespread there and devoid of any biblical references.

== Bibliography ==
Books

- Alvarez-Pedroza, Juan Antonio (2021). Sources of Slavic Pre-Christian Religion. Leiden: Koninklijke Brill. ISBN 978-90-04-44138-5.
- Badalanova Geller, Florientina (2017). Книга сущая в устах: фольклорная Библия бессарабских и таврических болгар (in Russian). Moscow: Университет Дмитрия Пожарского.
- Fyadosik, Anatol Syamyonavich (1983). Легенды i паданні (in Belarusian). Minsk: Наука і техніка.
- Kabakova, Galina (1999). "Женщина". In Tolstoy, Nikita (ed.). Slavic Antiquities: Ethnolinguistic Dictionary (in Russian). Vol. 2: Д (Давать) — К (Крошки). Moscow: Institute for Slavic Studies of the Russian Academy of Sciences. pp. 205–208. ISBN 5-7133-0982-7.
- Kabakova, Galina (2004). "Мужчина". In Tolstoy, Nikita (ed.). Slavic Antiquities: Ethnolinguistic Dictionary (in Russian). Vol. 3: К (Круг) — П (Перепелка). Moscow: Institute for Slavic Studies of the Russian Academy of Sciences. pp. 317–319. ISBN 5-7133-1207-0.
- Klejn, Leo (2004). Воскрешение Перуна. К реконструкции славянского язычества. Magicum (in Russian). Petersburg: Евразия. ISBN 5-8071-0153-7.
- Levkievska, Elena (2000). Мифы русского народа (in Russian). Moscow: Астрель, АСТ. ISBN 5-271-00676-X.
- Levkievska, Elena (2009). "Пот". In Tolstoy, Nikita (ed.). Slavic Antiquities: Ethnolinguistic Dictionary (in Russian). Vol. 4: П (Переправа через воду) — С (Сито). Moscow: Institute for Slavic Studies of the Russian Academy of Sciences. pp. 218–219. ISBN 978-5-7133-0703-5.
- Łuczyński, Michał (2020). Bogowie dawnych Słowian. Studium onomastyczne. Kielce: Kieleckie Towarzystwo Naukowe. ISBN 978-83-60777-83-1.
- Łuczyński, Michał (2022). Słowian. Śladami świętych opowieści przodków (in Polish). Szczecin: Triglav. ISBN 978-83-62586-70-7.
- Mallory, James Patrick; Adams, Douglas Quentin (1997). Encyclopedia Of Indo-European Culture. London, Chicago: Fitzroy Dearborn. ISBN 978-1-884964-98-5.
- Petrukhin, Vladimir (2000). "Древняя Русь. Народ. Князья. Религия". Из истории русской культуры (in Russian). Moscow: Языки русской культуры. pp. 13–402. ISBN 5-7859-0093-9.
- Petrukhin, Vladimir (2002). "Антропогонические мифы". Славянская мифология. Энциклопедический словарь (in Russian) (2 ed.). Moscow: Международные отношения. pp. 24–26. ISBN 5-7133-1069-8.
- Petrukhin, Vladimir (2012). "Сотворение мира". In Tolstoy, Nikita (ed.). Slavic Antiquities: Ethnolinguistic Dictionary (in Russian). Vol. 5: С (Сказка) — Я (Ящерица). Moscow: Institute for Slavic Studies of the Russian Academy of Sciences. pp. 137–142. ISBN 978-5-7133-1380-7.
- Памятники общественной мысли Древней Руси: В 3-х т. Библиотека отечественной общественной мысли с древнейших времён до начала XX века (in Russian). Vol. 1 Домонгольский период. Igor Danilevski. Moscow: Российская политическая энциклопедия (РОССПЭН). 2010. ISBN 978-5-8243-1234-8.

Journals

- Alekseev, Sergey (2011). "К реконструкции праславянской мифологии". Знание. Понимание. Умение (in Russian). Moscow: Moskiewski Uniwersytet Humanitarny: 79–89. ISSN 2218-9238.
- Bessonov, Igor (2014). "Религиозный и культурный контекст движения волхвов в 1060–1070-е гг" (PDF). Studia historica Europae orientalis. Исследования по истории Восточной Европы (in Russian). 7. Minsk: Republikański Instytut Szkolnictwa Wyższego: 22–54. ISSN 2079-1488.
- Ivanov, Vyacheslav; Toporov, Vladimir (1988). "Славянская мифология". Мифы народов мира: Энцикл. в 2 т. (in Russian). 2 : К – Я. Moscow: Советская энциклопедия: 54–64.
- Karpov, Aleksander (2017). Pavel Gaydenko (ed.). "«Восстание волхвов» на северо-востоке Руси (1071 г.) в Российской науке XVIII – начала XX вв" (PDF). Палеоросия. Древняя Русь: во времени, в личностях, в идеях (in Russian). 8. Petersburg: 54–64. ISSN 2686-9063.
- Ratobylska, Anna (1996). "Летописный рассказ о "движении волхвов" и религиозные представления финно-угров" (PDF). Славяноведение (in Russian). 5. Instytut Studiów Słowiańskich i Bałkańskich: 54–64.
