= Incest pornography =

Genre of pornography

Incest pornography is a genre of pornography involving the depiction of sexual activity between relatives. Incest pornography can feature actual relatives, but the main type of this pornography is fauxcest, which features non-related actors to suggest family relationship. This genre includes characters with various levels of kinship, including siblings, first cousins, aunts, uncles, parent(s), offspring, nieces and nephews. In many countries, incest pornography amounts to illegal pornography.

== Twincest and sibcest porn ==
Going back at least as far as the Christy twins in the 1970s, depictions of incest, and particularly incest between twins, have been a feature of gay pornography. Though the Christy twins may have been unrelated but similar-looking men and some twins have appeared together in scenes without substantial contact between them, some genuine twins have performed sexual acts on each other. It is illegal in many jurisdictions. For example, in Australia it is rated "Refused Classification" (RC).

The 1999 William Higgins production Double Czech included actual sex between the Bartok twins, as did the 2009 sequel between the Richter twins. Another pair of Czech twins, Elijah and Milo Peters, who work together condomless for both oral and anal sex for studio BelAmi. As of 2010, they were reported to be living together as a monogamous couple outside of their porn careers and want to continue working together for another 50 years. Some scenes with the Peters twins together have needed to be re-edited in order to gain approval from film classification censors for distribution in markets including the United Kingdom and the United States.

== Fauxcest ==
Fauxcest refers to pornographic or erotic depictions of incest by actors who are merely pretending to be related but in actuality have no biological relation. The term "fauxcest" is a portmanteau of "faux" and "incest", sometimes transcribed as "faux-incest" and sometimes used interchangeably with "family roleplay" or "fictional incest". Besides women, its primary consumers are couples and millennials. According to one pornographic film director, part of the appeal of the fauxcest genre is a desire by porn consumers to view taboo and controversial content.

Arguably the most famous example of the genre is the Taboo film series of the 1980s. The first film in this series, which starred Kay Parker, was released in 1980. It spawned numerous sequels, several of which won adult film awards. As of 2016, the genre had been growing in popularity at a rate of 1000% since 2011 and 178% since 2014, a spike that some industry professionals have attributed to female porn consumers who largely seek a content that is accompanied by a narrative. Variations of pretend relationships include siblings, mom–son, dad–daughter, step-relatives and various others.

One of the reasons behind a trend towards pseudoincest over actual blood-relation incest within fiction is the bannable nature of consanguineal forms since some publishers will refuse to publish such content.

On GameLink, one in ten purchases had a fauxcestual theme, and one sociologist has said the theme has become more mainstream as evidenced by its depiction on fantasy novel and television series such as Game of Thrones. Pseudo-incest fictional books began to increase in popularity in the year 2011. Some self-publishing companies are welcoming towards content that has pseudo-incestual themes.

== See also ==
- Incest between twins
- Incest in popular culture
