= Incest in media =

Like in literature, incest is an important yet controversial thematic element and plot device in films, anime and manga, television, and video games.

== Films ==
=== Father/daughter incest ===
- Pier Paolo Pasolini's 1975 film Salò, or the 120 Days of Sodom, a loose adaptation of the Marquis de Sade's aforementioned The 120 Days of Sodom, includes several examples of father-daughter incest.
- Mike de Leon's 1980 film Kisapmata (1980) has a depiction of father/daughter incest by rape, and it was the first major treatment of incest in the Philippine cinema.
- Twin peaks: Fire walk with me (1992) has a depiction of father/daughter incest by rape, between Laura Palmer and Leland Palmer.
- The Korean thriller Oldboy has father/daughter incest as one of its main plot elements.

=== Father/son incest ===
- Ari Aster's 2011 short film The Strange Thing About the Johnsons depicts a father trapped in an abusive, incestuous relationship with his son.
- Matheus Nachtergaele's 2009 film The Dead Girl's Feast contains a subplot of an incestuous relationship between the father and the Saint.

=== Mother/son incest ===
- In Incendies, a 2010 French-Canadian film about twin siblings travelling to Lebanon to find their brother and father in obedience to their late mother's will, the twins discover that they are the product of incest between their mother and a son she had in 1970, who raped her aged 18 when she was in prison for murder of a Christian far-right militant. They then give the two envelopes their mother has prepared (labelled "to the father" and "to the son" in French) to the same man after finding him in their own country under an assumed identity.

== Television ==
- In Mr. Robot it's revealed that Elliot Alderson was molested by his father Edward Alderson.

== Anime and manga ==
In 2010, Tokyo introduced and later passed a revision to the Tokyo Metropolitan Ordinance Regarding the Healthy Development of Youths which prohibited media sold to minors that glorified incest.

- Aki Sora (2007)
  - In April 2011, Itosugi announced that there will be no more printings of volumes 1 and 3 due to Tokyo Metropolitan Ordinance Regarding the Healthy Development of Youths.
- Yosuga no Sora (2010) is one of the most notorious and controversial examples for the depiction of incest in anime, in which the main focus of the story between brother and sister or twin siblings relationship. In the story, Sora has feelings for her twin brother, Haru, ever since they were kids. After their parents died, they moved back to the old house and Sora has been keeping her feelings suppressed while she fantasizes being with him.
  - In 2012 the Tokyo Metropolitan Government's Youth Healthy Development Council discussed the anime and determined that it did not violate the new revision regarding incest.
- Imouto Paradise 2 (2013)
  - In May 2014, this manga became the first work to officially be restricted as "unhealthy" in Tokyo under the 2010 revisions to the youth law for "glorifying incestuous acts".

== Video games ==
Some video games with themes of incest are the following on the list below:

- Yosuga no Sora (2008)
- The Coffin of Andy and Leyley (2023)

== See also ==
- Incest in literature
- Incest in folklore and mythology
- Incest in the Bible – Incest - sexual relations between close relatives - as described in the Bible
- Incest pornography – Genre of pornography
