= Lukas Ridgeston =

Slovak actor, director and model

- Born: April 5, 1974 (age 52); Bratislava, ČSSR (now Slovakia)
- Other name: Jan van Huig
- Occupations: Porn actor; erotic model; adult film director; editor
- Years active: 1993–present
- Modeling information
- Height: 1.77 m (5 ft 9 1/2 in)
- Hair color: Brown
- Eye color: Blue
- Agency: Bel Ami

Lukas Ridgeston (born 5 April 1974) is a Slovak actor and director in gay erotic movies and model in Bel Ami gay erotic magazines and books. He was born in Bratislava, then part of the former Czechoslovakia, now capital of Slovakia. Lukas Ridgeston is best known as "The King of Gay Porn" or just "The King".

== Career ==
His stage name originated with the editors of Freshmen magazine. (It is common practice for magazines to assign names to photos of models, rather than the studios or the models themselves.) The magazine did not want to use a name from an Eastern Bloc country and chose the name "Lucas Ridgeston" as sounding more "Ivy League". BelAmi changed the spelling to "Lukas" and both have been used ever since.

Ridgeston performed nearly exclusively as a top in his films; however, he does bottom in the films Lukas' Story 2: When Boy Meets Boy and Lucky Lukas. (Lukas' Story and Lukas' Story 2 have since been combined and marketed as Lukas' Stories.)

When asked, "Do you identify as gay, straight or bi-sexual?", he replied, "I always say I am sexual".

== Awards and recognition ==
- 1996 Adult Erotic Gay Video Awards (the "Grabbys") "Hot Shots" award with Cole Youngblood
- 1999 Ranked among the top 10 in Unzipped magazine's "Best Erotic Video Performers of the Millennium"
- 2000 GayVN Awards Hall of Fame inductee
- 2002 Unzipped magazine reader's poll named him "Hottest Porn Star of All Time"
- 2006 GayVN Awards "Best Actor in a Foreign Release" for Lukas in Love 3
- 2015 Prowler British Awards Best International Porn Star

== Selected videography ==
- Boytropolis (aka A Man's World) (1993)
- Lukas' Story Series of three films (1994–1995)
- Frisky Summer 2: Sebastian (1996)
- Lucky Lukas (1998)
- All About Bel Ami (2001)
- Lukas in Love Series of two films (2005)
- Thinking XXX (HBO documentary, 2005)
- The Private Life of Tim Hamilton (2006)
- Forever Lukas (2013)

== Books and print media ==
- XXX: 30 Porn-Star Photographs—A photograph of Ridgeston was used for the back cover
- Edition Euros 11: Photos of Lukas, photographed and published by the renowned photographer Bruno Gmünder in 1999.
- Unzipped 100—The 100 Greatest Gay Porn Films Ever
- Bel Ami Frisky Memories
- Bel Ami: Intimate Friends
- Bel Ami: Lukas in Love
- Bel Ami: Next Generation
- Edition Euros 11: Bel Ami—Photos of Lukas
- The Films of George Duroy: Adam Gay Erotica
- BelAmi 1997 Calendar
- Together, the BelAmi 1998 Calendar
- Perfect Moments, the BelAmi 2000 Calendar
- Vogue-Homme International magazine, Spring-Summer 2001

== Editor ==
- 101 Men Part 9 (2001)
- 101 Men Part 10 (2001)
- 101 Men Part 11 (2002)
- 101 Men Part 12 (2002)
- Personal Trainers: Part 7 (2003)

== See also ==
- List of male performers in gay porn films

Awards
Preceded by Tim Hamilton for Greek Holiday 1-2	GayVN Awards for Best Actor—Foreign Release for Lukas in Love; 2006	Succeeded by Jean Franko for The School for Lovers
