= Vladimir Petrukhin =

Russian historian (born 1950)

- Влади́мир Я́ковлевич Петру́хин
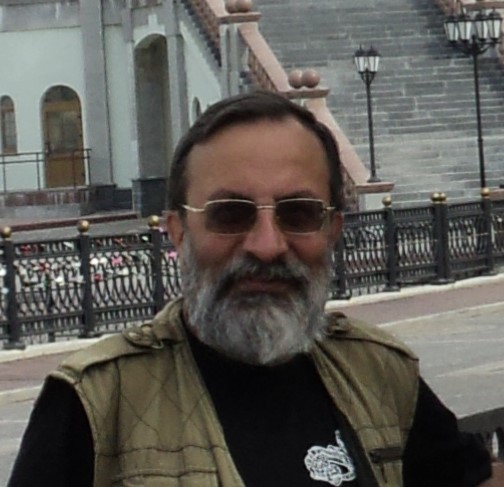
- Born: July 25, 1950; Pushkino, Soviet Union
- Citizenship: Russia
- Education: History, Archaeology
- Alma mater: Moscow State University
- Awards: Diploma of Open Society Institute (1996); Medal of Slavic Fund of Russia (2010). Likhachov Prize (2015)
- Scientific career
- Fields: History, Archaeology and Culture of Russia in Middle Ages (Slavs, Scandinavians, Khazars), Old Rus, Ethnography of North and East Europe (Slavs, Jews, Finno-Ugric peoples)
- Institutions: Institute of Slavic Studies of the Russian Academy of Sciences, Higher School of Economics
- Thesis: The Problems of Ethnic and Cultural History of Slavs and Rus in the 9th–11th Centuries (Russian: Проблемы этнокультурной истории славян и Руси в IX-XI вв.) (1994)
- Doctoral advisor: Daniil Avdusin

Vladimir Yakovlevich Petrukhin (Russian: Влади́мир Я́ковлевич Петру́хин; born on July 25, 1950, in Pushkino, Moscow Oblast, Soviet Union) is a Russian historian, archaeologist and ethnographer, Doctor of Historical Sciences (since 1994), chief research fellow of the Medieval Section in the Institute of Slavic Studies in the Russian Academy of Sciences, professor of Higher School of Economics.

After studying in the Moscow State University under Daniil Avdusin, Petrukhin defended his PhD thesis, "The Burial Cult of Pagan Scandinavia" (1975). In the post-Soviet era, he coordinated preservation and research projects focused on Khazar and Jewish history and culture, including initiatives under the auspices of the Russian Jewish Congress. He also led historical and ethnographic expeditions to study Jewish heritage in Podolia and Western Belarus, and organized salvage excavations at the site of a Khazar fort (situated across the Don River from Sarkel).

Petrukhin wrote copiously about the Early Middle Ages in Eastern Europe, including the origin of the Rus polity and the problem of the Rus Khaganate. He views the formation of the Old East Slavic state as the result of complex interactions among Slavic, Scandinavian, Finno-Ugric, and nomadic peoples.

== Biography ==
Vladimir Petrukhin was born on July 25, 1950, in Pushkino, Moscow Oblast.

- 1957–1965 – First High School in Pushkino.
- 1962–1967 – Young Archaeologists Club in Museum of History and Reconstruction of Moscow.
- 1967 – graduated from Fifth High School in Pushkino with a silver medal.
- 1967–1972 – student of Faculty of History of the Moscow State University.
- 1972 – graduated from the Faculty of History, qualification as historian, teacher of history and social science with knowledge of foreign language.
- 1972–1975 – postgraduate student at the Department of Archeology of Faculty of History (prof. Daniil Avdusin was a doctoral advisor).
- 1975 – defended a candidate thesis The Funeral Cult of Pagan Scandinavia (prof. Daniil Avdusin was a doctoral advisor); academic degree of Candidate of Historical Sciences was conferred.
- 1975–1992 – superior editor, scientific editor, senior scientific editor in the Editorial Office of Archaeology and Ethnography and the Editorial Office of World History of publisher "Soviet Encyclopedia".
- 1991–2004 – professor of Dubnov Higher School for the Humanities (until 2003 it was Jewish University in Moscow).
- since 1992 – superior, senior, chief research fellow of Institute of Slavic Studies (until 1995 it was Institute of Slavic and Balkan Studies) of the Russian Academy of Sciences.
- 1994 – defended a doctoral thesis The Problems of Ethnic and Cultural History of Slavs and Rus in the 9th–11th Centuries (Russian: Проблемы этнокультурной истории славян и Руси в IX-XI вв.) in Institute of Slavic and Balkan Studies; academic degree of Doctor of Historical Sciences was conferred.
- since 1992 – member of the academic council of the Center for University Teaching of Jewish Civilization "Sefer".
- 1997–2015 professor of the Department of Russian History of Middle Ages and Modern Period (until 2007 – the Department of Russian History of Ancient World and Middle Ages, until 2013 – the Department of Russian History of Middle Ages and Early Modern Period) in History and Archives Institute in the Russian State University for the Humanities.
- 2004 – Ministry of Education of Russia conferred to Vladimir Petrukhin the academic status of professor in the Department of Russian History of Ancient World and Middle Ages.
- since 2008 – professor of School of History in Faculty of Humanities in Higher School of Economics.

Vladimir Petrukhin was awarded Diploma of Open Society Institute (1996) for the victory in the contest "New Books on Social Sciences and Humanities for High School"; Medal of Slavic Fund of Russia (2010) for the great contribution to the preservation and development of the heritage of Cyril and Methodius; Likhachov Prize (2015) for monograph Rus in the 9th–10th Centuries. From Varangians Invitation to the Сhoice of Faith (Russian: Русь в IX-X веках. От призвания варягов до выбора веры).

== Researches ==
Vladimir Petrukhin researches Russian medieval history, archaeology and culture (Slavs, Scandinavians, Khazars) (including Old Rus), ethnography of North and East Europe (Slavs, Jews, Finno-Ugric peoples). The research works is characterized by complex approach and a use of all sources. Vladimir Petrukhin created new conception of early Russian history, in which geopolitics, ethnic and cultural history were key points (monographs: The Beginning of Ethnic and Cultural History of Rus in the 9th–11th Centuries, Russian: Начало этнокультурной истории Руси IX-XI веков, 1995; Rus in the 9th–10th Centuries. From Varangians Invitation to the Сhoice of Faith, Russian: Русь в IX-X веках. От призвания варягов до выбора веры, 2013, 2014).

- Vladimir Petrukhin takes part in many Russian and international historical, archaeological and ethnographic projects, including interdisciplinary expeditions to study of Slavic and Jewish history and culture; he also is a coordinator of projects for preservation and study of the Khazarian and Jewish historical and cultural artefacts in Dubnov Higher School for the Humanities ("Khazarian Project") of the Russian Jewish Congress.
- Member of editorial boards of some journals: "Bulletin of Jewish University" (Moscow – Jerusalem, since 1994), "Slavic Studies" ("Slavyanovedeniye", Moscow, since 1994), "Living Antiquity" ("Zhivaya Starina", Moscow, since 1995), "Problems of Art" ("Problemi na Izkustvoto", Sofia, Bulgaria, since 2004), almanac "Parallels" (since 2002), "Khazarian Almanac" (Kharkiv, Ukraine, since 2002); many collected articles and other scientific publications.
- Member of organizing committees of several Russian and international conferences on Russian and Khazarian history and archaeology and also Eastern European ethnography.
- In Russian State University for the Humanities since 1997, Vladimir Petrukhin gives courses of lectures on the early history of Russia, special courses on religious antiquities, ethnogenesis and early history of the Slavs; he manages an archaeological field practice of students. In Dubnov Higher School for the Humanities, he gives courses of lectures on the history of Russia in the Antiquity and the Middle Ages, on introduction to archaeology, he also manages an archaeological field practice of students. In the Institute of Asian and African Studies of the Moscow State University), he gives a special course "Khazars and the Early History of the Jews in Eastern Europe".
- Vladimir Petrukhin is an author of more than 500 research works, published from 1973 to the present time, among them he took part in the work for the "Slavic Antiquities. Ethnolinguistic Dictionary" (ed. by Nikita Tolstoy); an author of several popular scientific books.

== Main publications ==
=== Monographs, co-authorship and popular scientific publications ===
- The Beginning of Ethnic and Cultural History of Rus in the 9th–11th Centuries / Russian Academy of Sciences, Institute of Slavic and Balkan Studies. Smolensk; Moscow, 1995. 317 p. (Russian: Начало этнокультурной истории Руси IX-XI веков / Рос. акад. наук, Ин-т славяноведения и балканистики. – Смоленск : Русич; Moscow : Гнозис, 1995. – 317 с.).
- From Genesis to Exodus : the Biblical Subjects in Jewish and Slavic Folk Culture : Collected Articles / Sefer. Academic series; editor-in-chief is Vladimir Petrukhin. Moscow, 1998. Issue 2. (Russian: От Бытия к Исходу : отражение библейских сюжетов в славянской и еврейской народной культуре : сб. ст. / Центр Сэфер. Академическая серия; Отв. редактор В.Я. Петрухин. – М., 1998. – Вып. 2.).
- Old Rus. Moscow, 2000. 48 p. (Series: How and Why Wonder Books). (Russian: Древняя Русь. – М. : Слово, 2000. – 48 с. – (Что есть что).).
- Slavs : Textbook for Additional Education. Moscow, 2002. 112 p. (Russian: Славяне : [учеб. пособие для доп. образования]. – М. : Росмэн, 2002. – 112 с.).
- The Origins of Russia : Historical Stories / V. Petrukhin, A. Toroptsev. Moscow, 2002. 132 p. (Russian: Истоки России : ист. рассказы / В. Петрухин, А. Торопцев. – М. : Росмэн, 2002. – 132 с.
- Khazarian and Hebrew Documents of the 10th Century : Translation from Russian into English / Norman Golb, Omeljan Pritsak; scientific ed., afterword and commentaries by Vladimir Petrukhin; Russian Academy of Sciences, Institute of Slavic Studies. 2nd edition, corrected and supplemented. Jerusalem; Moscow, 2003. 239 p. (Series: Library of Russian Jewish Congress). First edition : Khazarian Hebrew Documents of the Tenth Century / N. Golb a. O. Pritsak. Ithaca; London : Cornell Univ. Press, 1982. (Russian: Хазарско-еврейские документы X века : пер. с англ. / Голб Норман, Прицак Омельян; Н. Голб и О. Прицак; науч. ред., послесл. и коммент. В.Я. Петрухина; Рос. акад. наук, Ин-т славяноведения. – Изд. 2-е, испр. и доп. – Иерусалим; М. : Гешарим : Мосты культуры, 2003. – 239 с., [8] л. к., факс. – (Библиотека Российского еврейского конгресса). – Пер. изд.: Khazarian Hebrew Documents of the Tenth Century / N. Golb a. O. Pritsak.- Ithaca; London : Cornell Univ. Press, 1982. – Доп. тит. л. ориг. англ. – Библиогр. в тексте. – Алф. указ.: с. 226–227. – ISBN 5-932731-26-5. 125).
- Essays on the History of the Peoples of Russia in Antiquity and the Early Middle Ages : Manual for Humanitarian Faculties / Vladimir Petrukhin, Dmitry Rayevsky. Moscow, 2004. 415 p. В.Я. Петрухин; Д.С. Раевский (2004). Очерки истории народов России в древности и раннем средневековье : учеб. пособие для гуманит. фак. вузов (in Russian). Moscow: Знак. p. 415. ISBN 5-7859-0057-2.).
- Myths of Finno-Ugric Peoples. Moscow, 2005. 463 p. (Russian: Мифы финно-угров. - М. : Астрель: АСТ: Транзиткнига, 2005. - 463 с.).
- Migration Period / Vladimir Petrukhin and others. Moscow, 2005. 179 p. (Russian: Великое переселение / [В.Я. Петрухин и др.]. – М. : Бук Хаус, 2005. – 179 с.).
- Old Rus. From 9th Century to 1263. Moscow, 2005. 190 p. (Russian: Древняя Русь. IX в. – 1263 г. – М. : АСТ : Астрель, 2005. – 190 с.).
- Origin Myths. Moscow, 2005. 464 p. (Russian: Мифы о сотворении мира. – М. : АСТ : Астрель : Люкс, 2005. – 464 с.).
- Before the Invasion. Moscow, 2005. 179 p. (Russian: Перед нашествием / [В.Я. Петрухин и др.]. – М. : Бук Хаус, 2005. – 179 с.).
- Christianization of Rus : from Paganism to Christianity. Moscow, 2006. 222 p. (Russian: Крещение Руси : от язычества к христианству. – М. : АСТ : Астрель, 2006. – 222 с.).
- Old Rus. Moscow, 2008. 95 p. (Russian: Древняя Русь. – М. : Дрофа-Плюс, 2008. – 95 с.).
- The "Jewish Myth" in the Slavic Culture / Olga Belova, Vladimir Petrukhin. Moscow; Jerusalem, 2008. 568 p. (Russian: «Еврейский миф» в славянской культуре / О.В. Белова, В.Я. Петрухин. – М. : Мосты культуры; Иерусалим : Гешарим, 2008. – 568 с.).
- Folklore and Book-Learning : Myth and Historical Reality / Olga Belova, Vladimir Petrukhin; Russian Academy of Sciences, Institute of Slavic Studies. Moscow, 2008. 262 p. (Russian: Фольклор и книжность : миф и исторические реалии / О.В. Белова, В.Я. Петрухин; Рос. акад. наук, Ин-т славяноведения. – М. : Наука, 2008. – 262 с.).
- Underworld : Myths of Different Peoples. Yekaterinburg, 2010. 414 p.; Idem. Moscow, 2010. 414 p. (Russian: Загробный мир : мифы разных народов. – Екатеринбург : У-Фактория, 2010. – 414 с.; То же. – М. : АСТ : Астрель, 2010. – 414 с.).
- The History of the Jewish People in Russia. Moscow; Jerusalem, 2010. (Co-author). (Russian: История еврейского народа в России. – М.; Иерусалим, 2010. (соавтор).).
- The Myths Of Ancient Scandinavia. Moscow, 2011. 463 p. (Russian: Мифы Древней Скандинавии. – М. : АСТ : Астрель, 2011. – 463 с.).
- "Rus and All the Peoples" : the Aspects of Historical Relationships : Historical and Archaeological Essays. Moscow, 2011. 384 p. (Russian: «Русь и вси языци» : Аспекты исторических взаимосвязей : Историко-археологические очерки. – М. : Языки славянских культур, 2011. – 384 с.).
- Khazaria in Cross-Cultural Space : the Historical Geography of Fortress Architecture, the Choice of Faith / Tatyana Kalinina, Valery Flyorov, Vladimir Petrukhin. Moscow, 2014. 208 p. (Russian: Хазария в кросскультурном пространстве : историческая география, крепостная архитектура, выбор веры / Т.М. Калинина, В.С. Флёров, В.Я. Петрухин. – М. : Рукописные памятники Древней Руси, 2014. – 208 с.).
- Rus in the 9th–10th Centuries. From Varangians Invitation to the Сhoice of Faith / 2nd edition, corrected and supplemented. Moscow, 2014. 464 p. (Russian: Русь в IX-X веках. От призвания варягов до выбора веры / Рос. акад. наук, Ин-т славяноведения. – М. : Форум : Неолит, 2013. – 464 с.; 2-е изд., испр. и доп. – М. : Форум : Неолит, 2014. – 464 с.).

=== Some articles ===
- Melnikova, Elena. Petrukhin, Vladimir. "The Legend of the Varangians Invitation" in Comparative Historical Perspective // 11th All-Union Conference on the Study of History, Economics, Literature and Language of the Scandinavian Countries and Finland / ed. by Yury Andreev and others. – Moscow, 1989. – Issue 1. – P. 108–110. (Russian: Мельникова Е.А., Петрухин В.Я. «Легенда о призвании варягов» в сравнительно-историческом аспекте // XI Всесоюзная конференция по изучению истории, экономики, литературы и языка Скандинавских стран и Финляндии / редкол.: Ю.В. Андреев и др. – М., 1989. – Вып. 1. – С. 108–110).
- Древо жизни: Библейский образ и славянский фольклор // Живая старина. – 1997. – № 1. – С. 8–9.
- Дунайская предыстория славян и начальная Русь // Истоки русской культуры : Археология и лингвистика. – М., 1997. – С. 139–144.
- «От тех варяг прозвася…» // Родина. – 1997. – № 10. – С. 12–16.
- Походы Руси на Царьград: К проблеме достоверности летописи // Восточная Европа в древности и средневековье: Материалы конф. ... – М., 1997. – С. 65–70.
- Мельникова Е.А., Петрухин В.Я. Русь и чудь: К проблеме этнокультурных контактов Восточной Европы и Балтийского региона в 1 -м тыс. н. э. // Балтославянские исследования, 1988–1996. – М., 1997. – С. 40–51.
- Большие курганы Руси и Северной Европы: К проблеме этнокультурных связей в раннесредневековый период // Историческая археология: традиции и перспективы. – М., 1998. – С. 361–369.
- К дохристианским истокам древнерусского княжеского культа // ΠΟΛΥΤΡΟΠΟΝ: К 70-летию В. Н. Топорова. – М., 1998. – С. 882–892.
- Выбор веры: Летописный сюжет и исторические реалии // Древнерусская культура в мировом контексте: археология и междисциплинарные исследования: Материалы конф. ... – М., 1999. – С. 73–85.
- Древняя Русь: Народ. Князья. Религия // Из истории русской культуры. – М.: Яз. рус. культуры, 2000. – Т. I: (Древняя Русь). – С. 13–410. – (Язык. Семиотика. Культура).
- «Боги и бесы» русского средневековья: род, рожаницы и проблема древнерусского двоеверия // Славянский и балканский фольклор. Народная демонология / Отв. ред. С.М. Толстая. – М., 2000. – С. 314–343.
- «Русский каганат», скандинавы и Южная Русь: средневековая традиция и стереотипы современной историографии // Древнейшиие государства Восточной Европы. 1999 г. Восточная и Северная Европа в средневековье / Отв. ред. Г.В. Глазырина; Отв. секретарь С.Л. Никольский; [Отв. ред. сер. Е.А. Мельникова]. – М.: Вост. лит., 2001 – С. 127–142. (Памяти Т. С. Нунена).
- Легенда о призвании варягов и балтийский регион // Древняя Русь. Вопросы медиевистики. – 2008. – № 2 (32). – С. 41–46.
- Early Slavs and Rus' in the Balkans (6–10th Centuries): First Contacts with the World of Civilization (Summary of article) on website of Association Internationale d'Etudes du Sud-Est Europeen.
