= Elijah and Milo Peters =

Former gay porn star twins

Elijah Peters and Milo Peters (born February 1990) are identical twin brothers and former porn stars from Czech Republic, who gained notoriety for having sex with each other in gay pornographic films of BelAmi.

== Early life and education ==
According to the twins, they were “very close” as children and first began having sex with each other when they were 15 years old (their first sexual experience with another person happened before they were 13). They decided to pursue a career in gay porn around the same time when they started being intimate with one another.

Before working in porn, Milo had graduated from a technical college and Elijah had completed secondary school education.

== Career ==
When the twins turned 18, they responded to an ad in a magazine and submitted their photos to BelAmi, mentioning that they were willing to have sex with each other on camera.

They made their porn debut with BelAmi in 2009, and at the end of the year the studio released a scene billed as “The Ultimate Taboo Finally Broken” which showed the twins having bareback sex. According to the studio's publicist, the scene increased BelAmiOnline.com’s membership by 25 percent overnight.

In 2010, the studio released their scenes in a DVD entitled Taboo, which became the studio’s best-selling title of the year, selling more than 20,000 copies. Subsequent DVD releases featuring the twins, such as Taboo 2 (2011) and Doing it Together (2012), also saw strong sales.

== Personal life ==
The Peters Twins live in Prague. Milo is two minutes older than Elijah, and both of them are bisexual.

The twins claimed to be lovers in real life, who were monogamous outside of porn. One of the twins said about the other, "My brother is my boyfriend, and I am his boyfriend. . . He is my lifeblood, and he is my only love." They also said that if one of them died, the other would commit suicide. However, it's been questioned if the story of their romantic relationship was just a part of their marketing. It was also speculated that they might not be related to each other at all, but shared enough similarities that they could be cast by BelAmi with an incest narrative.

After they started working in porn, their parents found about them when someone sent a link of one of their videos, and they were forsaken by their family.

== See also ==
- Incest between twins
