= Incest in literature =

Incest is an important thematic element and plot device in literature, with famous early examples such as Sophocles' classic Oedipus Rex, a tragedy in which the title character unwittingly kills his father and marries his mother. It occurs in medieval literature, both explicitly, as related by denizens of Hell in Dante's Inferno, and winkingly, as between Pandarus and Criseyde in Chaucer's Troilus. The Marquis de Sade was famously fascinated with "perverse" sex acts such as incest, which recurs frequently in his works, The 120 Days of Sodom (1785), Philosophy in the Bedroom (1795), and Juliette (1797).

== Modern literature ==
Vladimir Nabokov's novel Ada or Ardor: A Family Chronicle (1969) deals very heavily with the incestuous relationships in the intricate family tree of the main character, Van Veen. Ernesto Sábato's On Heroes and Tombs explores, among other subjects, the romantic relationship between a man and his daughter. In his novel Hogg, written in 1969, Samuel R. Delany employed incest as a way to push the boundaries of heteronormative sex. Toni Morrison's debut novel The Bluest Eye (1970) tells the story of Pecola, a young girl raped by her father. The Cement Garden (1978) by Ian McEwan and Flowers in the Attic (1979) by V. C. Andrews explore the motive of teenage siblings attracted to each other. Dorothy Allison wrote about incest and sexual abuse in Trash: Short Stories (1988) and Bastard Out of Carolina (1992).

In Japanese literature, the light novel series Mushoku Tensei (2012) has several depictions of incestuous relationships.

== See also ==
- Incest in folklore and mythology
- Incest in media
- Incest in the Bible – Incest - sexual relations between close relatives - as described in the Bible
- Incest pornography – Genre of pornography
