= Incest between twins =

Incest between twins or "twincest" is a subclass of sibling incest and includes both heterosexual and homosexual relationships.

== In Asia ==
Incest was commonplace in Southeast Asian creation myths which prominently featured twin or sibling couples. In these stories, the brother usually wooed and wed his sister, who bore his child or children, but on discovering that they are siblings, they are often (but not always) forced to part.

== In Europe ==
Twin incest is a prominent feature in ancient Germanic mythology, and its modern manifestations, such as the relationship between Siegmund and Sieglinde in Richard Wagner's Die Walküre, and a feature in some Greek mythology, such as the story of Byblis and Kaunos. There are strong parallels between the Germanic portrayals of twin incest and those of the Balinese Ramayana, and some scholars have speculated an early Indo-European link.

The theme also appears in English literature, such as the incest between the twins Polydore and Urania in Delarivier Manley's The New Atalantis.

One supposed case of incest between twins, in which twins who were adopted by separate families as infants later married without knowing they were brother and sister, was mentioned in a House of Lords debate on the Human Fertility and Embryology Bill in January 2008. According to the charity Adults Affected by Adoption, there had been other cases of this sort that had involved siblings. The story was widely publicised in the British press, although its truthfulness was called into question. In a 1983 review of the scholarly literature on twin homosexuality and twin incest, Ray Bixler concluded that "most same-sex homosexual twins, if reared with their co-twins, do not attempt or even want to seduce them in adulthood". His study drew on Edvard Westermarck's hypothesis that sexual desire is generally absent in relationships between members of a nuclear family due to the Westermarck Effect.

== In fiction ==
The fantasy fiction series A Song of Ice and Fire describes a secret relationship between Jaime and Cersei Lannister, who are fraternal twins. Within the setting of the books, various historical characters from House Targaryen were married to their siblings.

The Japanese series Yosuga no Sora features heavy depiction of romance and sex between twins heterosexual Haruka and Sora.

In the 2011 series Law & Order Special Victims Unit: season 12 episode 19 "Bombshell"- Cassandra Davina played by Rose McGowan was involved in a sexual relationship with her twin brother telling Detective Stabler her and her brother came into the world together and that they were each other's soul mates.

== In gay pornography ==
Twincest has been a recurring theme in gay pornography since the 1970s. The 1983 film Brian's Boys, 1993, includes brothers Doug and Gary Phillips having sex during the last scene of the film. Gary is seen barebacking Doug.

In 2009, Elijah and Milo Peters, then-19-year-old Czech identical twin brothers, gained notoriety for having sex with one another in gay pornographic films for BelAmi. According to them, they developed a romantic and sexual relationship with each other at age 15 and sent photos of themselves to BelAmi at age 18, saying they were open to having sex with each other on camera. BelAmi's videos featuring the twins originally involved little contact between them, but gradually escalated to featuring manual sex, oral sex, and anal sex. Their popularity led to the traffic on BelAmi's website doubling in 2009 and a tour of gay nightclubs in Florida. Maureen O'Connor of Gawker called the Peters twins "the most famous twincest stars" in 2012, while Graham Gremore of Queerty referred to them as "perhaps the most famous pair of gay twin lovers" in 2014.

== See also ==
- Incest
- Incest in the Bible
