= Fyokla Tolstaya =

Russian journalist (born 1971)

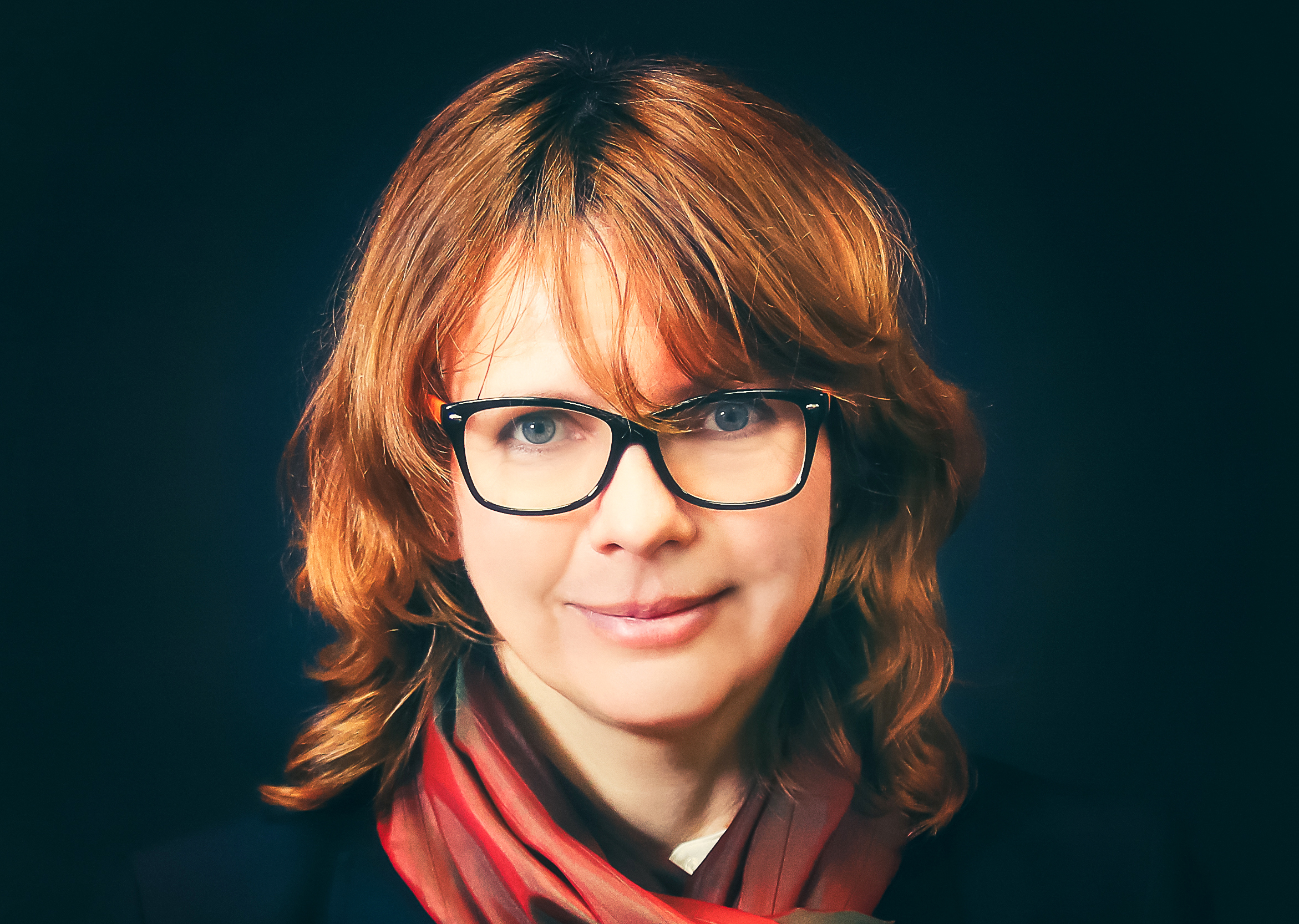
- Tolstaya in 2018
- Born: Anna Nikitichna Tolstaya; 27 February 1971 (age 55); Moscow, Russia
- Occupations: Journalist; radio; television presenter

Fyokla Nikitichna Tolstaya (Russian: Фёкла Никитична Толстая; born 27 February 1971), also known as Fekla Tolstoy, is a Russian journalist, cultural figure, and TV and radio presenter. She is the daughter of Academician Nikita Tolstoy (and a great-great-granddaughter of the author Leo Tolstoy).

== Biography ==
Fyokla Tolstaya was born Anna Nikitichna Tolstaya on 27 February 1971 in Moscow. She holds a degree in Slavic philology from the Moscow State University and trained as a director at the Russian Institute of Theatre Arts (GITIS).

She began a career in journalism in the late 1990s, working as a magazine critic, newspaper columnist, and host on the radio stations Echo of Moscow and Radio Mayak.

== Media and cultural work ==
Tolstaya was the host of several popular Russian television programmes, including People's Artist, based on the British reality television series Pop Idol. She is the longtime host of a morning talk show called "The Observer" on Russia's main dedicated culture channel (TV Kultura).

She hosted the Russian documentary series "Great Dynasties" (2005–2006) and was the author and host of a documentary series called "The Tolstoys" about the history of the Tolstoy family (2011). In 2022, she authored and hosted a documentary series called "Museums Without Borders" that explores contemporary museum practices in different regions of Russia.

Tolstaya also appeared as an actress in the films Seraphim Polubes and Other Inhabitants of the Earth (1984), The Old Alphabet (1987) and To Be Victor Pelevin. Sorry, Who? (2020).

In 2008, she was a finalist in the Russian figure skating competition Stars on Ice, where she performed alongside Olympic medal-winning skater Artur Dmitriev.

=== Leo Tolstoy's heritage ===
Tolstaya has been head of development at the Leo Tolstoy State Museum in Moscow since 2012. She led several projects in the digitisation of culture, including a crowdsourcing project called "All of Tolstoy in One Click" to digitise Tolstoy's entire body of work – spanning novels, diaries, letters, childhood memories, and religious and philosophical tracts – and make it fully available online. The free website launched in 2013. Tolstaya also worked with Samsung to create a mobile app called "Live Pages" that presents classical literary texts in an interactive online format.

Tolstaya has coordinated several large-scale online reading marathons dedicated to Tolstoy and other authors of classical literature. In 2014 she organised a 36-hour reading marathon of Anna Karenina in partnership with Google. The live broadcast, which streamed on Google+ and YouTube, went viral and entered the Guinness World Records as the largest audience for a live-streamed reading marathon.

In 2015, Tolstaya organised an online public reading marathon of War and Peace. The four-day event had more than 1,300 participants, including Polish film director Andrzej Wajda and a Russian cosmonaut who contributed a reading from the International Space Station.

Tolstaya is active in the field of digital humanities and co-authored a project called Textograf, a web-based app for the digitisation of manuscripts, among other projects.
