= Nikita Tolstoy =

Russian linguist (1923–1996)

- Никита Толстой
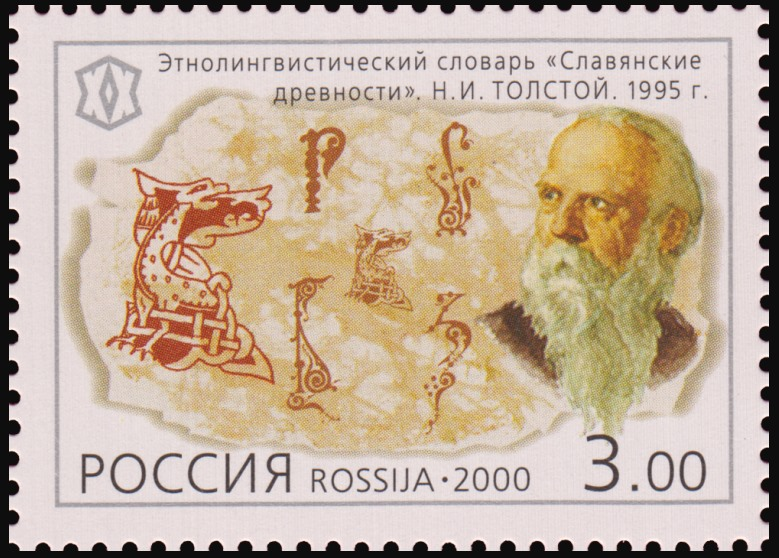
- A 2000 Russian postage stamp of Tolstoy
- Born: 15 April 1923; Vršac, Kingdom of Serbs, Croats, and Slovenes (now Serbia)
- Died: 28 June 1996 (aged 73); Moscow, Russia
- Spouse: Svetlana Shur
- Children: 2, including Fyokla
- Relatives: Leo Tolstoy (great-grandfather); Ilya Tolstoy (grandfather)

Academic background
- Education: Moscow State University
- Doctoral advisor: Samuil Bernstein

Academic work
- Discipline: Slavistics

Nikita Ilyich Tolstoy (Russian: Никита Ильич Толстой; 15 April 1923 – 28 June 1996) was Russian Slavist (linguist, philologist, folklorist). A specialist in Slavic dialectology, historical linguistics, and traditional Slavic culture, he was one of the founders of ethnolinguistics in the Soviet Union and the leading figure of the Moscow ethnolinguistic school. His grandfather Count Ilya Tolstoy was the second son of writer Leo Tolstoy.

== Early life and education ==
Tolstoy was born in Vršac, in the Kingdom of Serbs, Croats and Slovenes (present-day Serbia), where his family lived in emigration after the Russian Revolution. He was educated in Serbia and spent his youth there.

Following the German invasion of Yugoslavia during World War II, Tolstoy joined the Yugoslav partisan movement in 1941. In 1944 he entered the Red Army and fought against the Wehrmacht in Yugoslavia, Hungary, and Austria.

After the war, he moved to Moscow. In 1950 he graduated from the Faculty of Philology of Moscow State University, where he studied under the linguist Samuil Bernstein. In 1954 he joined the Institute of Slavic and Balkan Studies, with which he remained associated throughout his career.

== Scholarly work ==
Tolstoy's research encompassed the history of Slavic literary languages, Slavic dialectology, ethnolinguistics, folklore, and traditional culture. His studies addressed Serbian, Russian, Macedonian, Slovene, Sorbian, Belarusian, Bulgarian, and other Slavic languages.

He argued that language cannot be studied in isolation from a people's spiritual culture. He demonstrated the structural similarity between language and traditional culture, viewing rituals, beliefs, folklore, and material objects of everyday life as distinct "texts" that can be read and analyzed using linguistic methods. In support of this view, he showed that the geographic boundaries of certain words (isoglosses) often coincide with the distribution of ethnographic phenomena (e.g., particular types of wedding rituals).

During the 1950s Tolstoy conducted field research on Bulgarian dialects in Bulgaria and in the Soviet republics of Ukraine and Moldavia. From 1962 to 1986 he directed a series of dialectological and ethnolinguistic expeditions to the Polesie region, which became an important source of material for his later work on Slavic folk culture and language. He developed a system for the integrated collection of dialect words, beliefs, rituals, and magical practices within a single locality. This approach made it possible to document archaic layers of culture before they disappeared completely.

Tolstoy made significant contributions to Paleoslavistics and the study of the medieval literary languages of the Slavs. He proposed distinguishing between the concepts of Old Church Slavonic and Church Slavonic, arguing that the earliest literary language of the Orthodox Slavs should be understood as a unified written language that he termed Old Slavonic. According to his interpretation, this language represented a supra-dialectal literary norm based on South Slavic dialects and strongly influenced by Greek literary models.

His work on Slavic dialects, traditional culture, mythology, and ethnogenesis led to the development of ethnolinguistics as a distinct scholarly discipline in the Soviet Union. He defined ethnolinguistics as the study of the ways in which cultural, social, and mythological concepts are reflected in language, drawing heavily on historical linguistic evidence and folklore.

== Academic career and organizational activities ==
Tolstoy began teaching at Moscow State University in 1968 and was appointed professor in 1976. In 1987 he was elected a full member of the Soviet Academy of Sciences. Following the dissolution of the Soviet Union, he became a member of the Presidium of the Russian Academy of Sciences in 1992.

Tolstoy was the initiator, co-author, and editor-in-chief of the encyclopedic dictionary Slavic Antiquities ("Славянские древности"), published in five volumes between 1995 and 2012 and regarded as one of the major reference works on traditional Slavic culture.

From 1965 to 1987 Tolstoy served as deputy editor-in-chief of Soviet Slavic Studies. In 1993 he became editor-in-chief of Questions of Linguistics ("Вопросы языкознания"). In 1990 he was appointed chairman of the editorial board preparing the complete collected works of Leo Tolstoy.

He chaired the Soviet Committee of Slavists from 1986 and its successor, the Russian Committee of Slavists, from 1992.

== Personal life ==
Tolstoy was married to the linguist Svetlana Tolstaya (née Shur). They had two daughters, Marfa Tolstaya, a linguist, and Anna Tolstaya (better known as Fyokla Tolstaya), a television and radio presenter.

He died in Moscow on 28 June 1996 and was buried in the Tolstoy family cemetery in the village of Kochaki near Yasnaya Polyana. A bronze statue of him was unveiled in his native Vršac in 2023 (to commemorate the centenary of his birth).
