= Incest in folklore and mythology =

Halga seducing his own daughter Yrsa, by Jenny Nyström (1895).

Incest in folklore and mythology serves multiple purposes as a recurring and intricate theme, often employed as a narrative mechanism to explain origins, or address the consequences of concealed identities. Its prevalence across diverse cultures, from polytheistic pantheons to tribal deluge myths, underscores its role as a versatile storytelling device. (Note: Attributed to multiple sources:)

== Polytheistic deities ==
In numerous polytheistic traditions, incestuous relationships among deities are a common motif, encompassing sibling marriages, parent-child consorts, and other close kin pairings. These relationships frequently serve not only as sensational narrative elements but to reinforce the closed genealogical structure inherent in pantheons and to explain the birth of successive generations. Gaia and her own son Uranus produced twelve offspring (Titans): six males (Oceanus, Coeus, Crius, Hyperion, Iapetus, and Cronus) and six females (Theia, Rhea, Themis, Mnemosyne, Phoebe, and Tethys). Four of the male Titans (Oceanus, Coeus, Hyperion, and Cronus) married their sisters, generating further offspring. Later, Zeus, an offspring of Cronus and Rhea, wed his aunts Themis and Mnemosyne, and also begot Persephone with his older sister Demeter. In Orphic traditions, Persephone's birth is attributed to Zeus and his mother Rhea, exemplifying a deity seducing his own mother. Other Greek myths similarly trace the origins of cultural goddesses, such as those of music and dance, to incestuous parentage. The siblings Shu and Tefnut produced Geb and Nut, another brother-sister pair who married. Their grandson Horus later took his mother Isis as consort, representing a mother-son union. Ra occupies multiple relational roles with Hathor, who is depicted variously as his daughter, mother, and wife. Hathor herself is at times both mother and spouse to Horus. These examples highlight how incestuous unions among deities function as both narrative elements and mythic explanations for polytheistic lineages. A myth from the Indonesian island of Celebes tells of the female deity Lumimu-ut and her son, whom she sends forth with a staff to find a wife shorter than the staff's length. Unbeknownst to both, the staff grows until, when reunited, the son mistakes his mother (now comparatively shorter) for his destined bride. He marries her, and she bears him many offspring.

== Unwitting incest ==
Unwitting incest is a frequent group of motifs in folklore, where individuals unknowingly enter into incestuous relationships due to mistaken identities or ignorance of their true kinship. Oedipus-type tales, a subtype of this motif, often additionally feature a forewarning of the incest that is nonetheless consummated despite efforts to avoid it. Narrower examples include a sister accidentally matching her brother's ideal wife criteria and slaves uncovering their shared parentage after being ordered to marry.

=== Oedipus-type tales ===
Oedipus-type tales are narratives that mirror the central plot of Sophocles’ Oedipus Rex: a forewarning that a mother will unknowingly marry her own son, prompting her to abandons or expose the infant to avert the fate. If she is of noble birth, the deserted child survives and after exhibiting exceptional prowess (typically by accomplishing a daunting task among a host of suitors) wins his mother's hand in marriage as a reward. Unaware of their kinship, the pair consummate the union; the incest is discovered either on the wedding night through recognition of a childhood token or distinctive bodily mark, or later, after they have borne children together.

This narrative framework appears in diverse cultures worldwide. In ancient Greece, aside from Oedipus Rex, where Queen Jocasta has already borne four children (Eteocles, Polynices, Antigone and Ismene) by the time the incest is discovered, Euripides’ The Phoenician Women similarly emphasizes the prolonged ignorance of the couple to their blood ties. In the Indonesian legend of Tangkuban Perahu, Princess Dayang Sumbi marries a warrior, unaware he is her son, when he successfully retrieves her lost weaving needle, only for her to recognize his scar later. In another Greek myth, Auge nearly consummates her marriage with her son Telephus before it is narrowly averted. Variants also appear in Indian, Albanian, British, Malaysian, Iranian and other folktale traditions.

Recurring motifs in Oedipus-type narratives include: a forewarning of the mother-son marriage; the mother's desertion or exposure of the infant; the child's rapid maturation; the mother's youth and beauty; the unwitting consummation of the incestuous bond; and eventual recognition via an object, scar or the birth of offspring.

A notably minimalist variant is the Finnish folktale "The Boy Who Married his Mother." In this version, a father, driven mad, wounds his son and casts him adrift. Rescued and raised by strangers, the son ultimately returns, marries his mother, and only discovers their relationship in a sauna when the mother recalls his scar. Here, the forewarning is absent and the father dies before his son returns; the mother's fainting replaces tragedy at the moment of discovery. Despite its sparse detail, this tale falls within the broad spectrum of Oedipus-cognate narratives, suggesting either descent from the Greek model or a shared ancestral story.

=== Trickery and mistaken identity ===
These tales, though culturally distinct and historically unconnected to the Oedipus narrative, often employ trickery, disguise, mistaken identity, moral testing, and the shock of discovery to explore the incest taboo. For example, in the Alur folktale "Uken" from Uganda, a mother, ridiculed by her son for her age, rejuvenates herself. Adorned with oil and beads, she lies on his sleeping mat, leading him to mistake her for his promised lover. After he unwittingly consummates with her, she makes known to him the identity of who he slept with at dawn, leaving him stunned. This tale, rooted in an oral-only culture, underscores the independent emergence of incest narratives.

Similarly, a tale collected in 1988 from a nonliterate storyteller in rural northeastern Brazil involves the folk hero Camoes. Camoes tricks a king into believing he seduced his own mother by arranging for his mother to meet him at a bridge, implying a tryst to the king's hidden spy. Upon arrival, he then feigns shock at her presence and stages an encounter designed to appear carnal to the king's hidden spy, thereby exposing the king's gullibility rather than actual incest. This narrative frames the incestuous implication as a deceptive joke targeting the king (and audience). The nonliterate storyteller initially denied knowing incest tales but shared this after reflection, underscoring cultural reluctance to discuss such themes.

Medieval European tradition recounts the story of the Greek philosopher Secundus, who, seeking to test his mother's virtue after returning home in disguise as a suitor, successfully seduces her and then reveals his identity, shocking her. A parallel tale in Chihuahua, Mexico, describes a king instructing his servants to persistently flirt with and seduce his mother. After her initial resistance and she complains of the advances of two servants, the king orders a further encounter by a third. Ultimately, the third's flattery leads her to invite him to her bedroom for a nocturnal encounter. The king substitutes himself by disguising as the servant, enters her chamber, causing his mother to gasp ("My son!") upon recognition of him and the exposure of her willingness. These narratives use incest to probe moral questions about female chastity and share a common structure: the son (often disguised) seduces the mother to prove her lack of virtue, subsequently revealing his identity.

In a French tale from Languedoc, a wealthy widow, devoted to her son after her husband's death, learns of his attempts to seduce a servant girl. Doubting the girl's claims, she takes her place in bed to confront him. However, she succumbs to the pleasure as they sleep together, and she becomes pregnant. However, "instead of humbling herself and owning that of ourselves alone, and without the aid of God, we can do nothing but sin, she thought by her own efforts and by her tears to repair the past and prevent future mischief, always imputing her sin to the occasion, and not to wickedness, for which there is no remedy but the grace of God. As if there was but one sort of sin which could bring damnation, she applied her whole mind to avoid that one; but pride, which the sense of extreme sinfulness should destroy, was too strongly rooted in her heart, and grew in such a manner, that, to avoid one evil, she committed several others." To conceal her pregnancy, she sends her son away immediately with his governor under pretext of his education, feigns illness, moves to her brother's house, secretly gives birth to a daughter, entrusts her bastard brother to arrange the child's care (a girl raised as his own), and lives thereafter with increased austerity. Years later, she permits her son's return only if he marries first, fearing a relapse. This story explores maternal love, temptation, and the consequences of taboo acts.

== Calamity Myths with Close-Kin Marriages ==
In each of these myths, the same basic pattern appears: only very close relatives survive a cataclysm, they marry out of necessity, and from their union spring the many peoples of the world. This widespread motif shows how different cultures have used similar stories to explain human origins after a disaster. Several tribal and folk traditions tell of a great flood that wipes out everyone except one small family. To repopulate the world, the survivors, often a brother and sister or rarely a mother and her child, marry each other and become the ancestors of all people.

1. Yunnan Province, China (Miao people): After a massive flood, only a mother and her young son survive. The mother accidentally eats a special nut that turns her into a beautiful young woman. As the boy grows up, they marry and become the parents of the next generation.
2. Central India (Bhuiya, Maria, Bondo, Gabada, Kond, Saora, Kol Tribes): Most groups tell of a brother and sister surviving a flood, marrying, and starting the human race. The Gabada also have a tale where a mother and son survive, wed, and repopulate the earth.
3. Russian Far East (Udege): A brother and sister are the only ones saved from a world-drowning flood. They marry each other and become the forebears of everyone on earth.
4. Taiwan (Twenty-Eight Variants): On various islands, stories repeat the theme: one brother and one sister survive and marry. From each pair, the entire human population descends.
5. Mindanao, Philippines (Mandaya People): A flood spares only one pregnant woman. She gives birth to a son named Uacatan (Watakan). When he grows up, he marries his mother, and all people are said to come from them.
6. Northern Philippines (Ifugao, Isneg, Igorot): These highland tribes also tell of a brother and sister who survive a flood and marry to repopulate the world.
7. Southern Vietnam (Sedang, Mon‐Khmer Folklore): A woman named Xnghi alone survives by taking refuge atop Ngọc Linh Mountain. She gives birth to a son. As he reaches adulthood, he asks to wed her. They have four sons and four daughters. Each brother and sister pair marries. Their eldest pair move to the plains and become the ancestors of the Doan (Viet) people. The second pair found the Lao people. The third pair go inland and become the Cham people. The last pair stay in the highlands and become the Tmoi.

== Jokes and humor ==
The Ozarks joke about Jack and his family is an example of a folkloric tale that explores incestuous relationships within a nuclear family, distinguished by the participants’ unabashed enjoyment and the absence of guilt or consequences. Documented in Indiana since the 1890s and later reported in northern California in the early 1950s and London in 1954, the joke has circulated widely across regions and time periods. Folklorist Vance Randolph notes its numerous variations, with dialogue reassigned among different family members, creating a series of closely related narratives. Gershon Legman, a folklore scholar, described it as one of the "dirtiest" stories known to tellers, an assessment tied to the family's gleeful engagement in incest without moral or emotional conflict, confining the tale's scope to positive eroticism. In the standard version, Jack and his older sister Jenny are alone at home on a hot day. Jack, seeking relief from the heat, strips naked and lies on the floor, while Jenny, minimally clothed, joins him. Their interaction progresses from casual conversation to physical intimacy, with Jenny playfully noting Jack's physical resemblance to a jackass (suggesting the origin of his name) before proposing intercourse. After applying grease to facilitate the act, the encounter succeeds, prompting Jack to declare Jenny superior to their mother ("Maw"). Jenny responds by citing their father ("Paw") expressing the same sentiment, revealing the full extent of heterosexual incest within the family. This punch line, blending humor and shock, underscores the tale's provocative nature, often evoking both laughter and unease, as recalled by an author hearing it in the 1950s. The joke's structure supports modifications, such as shifting focus to competition among family members. In some variants, Jenny asserts Jack surpasses "Paw", with "Maw" concurring, highlighting subtle rivalries (e.g.: Jack and "Paw" favoring Jenny over "Maw"). These adaptations, as Randolph observes, demonstrate the tale's flexibility, functioning as a "mini-generator" for related family-complex stories. Its enduring popularity and adaptability cement its place in folk humor as a bold commentary on taboo subjects.

== Other motifs ==
Folklore encompasses a broad range of additional incest-related motifs, reflecting complex human relationships. These include:

- Brothers desiring marriage with their sisters, sometimes sparking conflict.
- Sisters seduced or tricked by brothers into incestuous acts.
- Mothers testing their sons’ honor through seduction.
- Lovers discovering shared parentage after falling in love.
- Incestuous marriages arranged by deception.
- Unwitting incest averted by chance or realization.

Narrower examples include an identification mark exposing the identity of a sister's incognito lover as her brother, a brother's incestuous desire enraging his sister, an honest dog divulging incest, enigmatic words betraying incest, a disguised sister tricking her brother into impregnating her, a brother unknowingly winning his sister's hand, a brother thinks he got a child with his sister by an earbox, a queen in love with her brother, a son unwittingly infatuated with his mother, an incognito son test his mother's chastity, a son courting his own mother, and a brother unwittingly ravishing his own sister. These narratives explore passion, mistaken identity, and boundaries.

== Miscellaneous ==
Across geographically and culturally isolated, nonliterate societies, incest recurs as a distinct folkloric theme, suggesting its independent emergence rather than diffusion from literate traditions. A tale from a hunter-horticulturalist people of the Amazon exemplifies the incest theme arising independently in oral-only cultures. It shows no signs of borrowing from Western sources, underscoring how incest narratives can develop in parallel across diverse human communities. This tale, recorded among the Matsigenka (Peruvian Amazon) peoples, relates how, a youth named Shakanari, following his father's death, cohabitates with his mother and treats her "in all respects" and "in all ways as his wife." When questioned, the storyteller affirms that this phrase denotes a fully conjugal relationship, indicating an incest motif central to the narrative.

== See also ==
- Incest in literature
- Incest in media
