= Howard Roffman =

American lawyer (born 1953)

- Born: April 18, 1953 (age 73); Philadelphia, Pennsylvania, U.S.
- Education: University of Pennsylvania; University of Florida (JD)
- Occupations: lawyer, marketing executive, photographer

Howard Roffman (born April 18, 1953) is an American lawyer and marketing executive, best known for his work on the Star Wars franchise as the head of Licensing at Lucasfilm. He is also a photographer, known for a series of books of gay-positive images published by Bruno Gmünder. In 2013 he decided to take a break from photography and focus on other priorities.

== Career ==
Roffman has stated of himself, that he is a "white, Jewish man who grew up in a decidedly white middle-class section of Philadelphia". He attended the University of Pennsylvania and in 1977 obtained a J.D. degree from the University of Florida College of Law. He served as a law clerk on United States Court of Appeals for the Fifth Circuit and afterwards, at the Washington D.C. law firm of Morgan, Lewis & Bockius.

In 1980 Roffman joined the movie production company Lucasfilm to do legal counseling and afterwards, was promoted to general counsel. Roffman then became Lucasfilm's Vice President of Licensing in 1986.

In 1991, he convinced Lucas to publish the first in a series of Star Wars-spin-off novels. The book, Heir to the Empire by noted science fiction author Timothy Zahn stayed on The New York Times Best Seller list for nineteen weeks, paving the way for a highly successful re-launch of the franchise.

In 1999, Roffman was appointed President of Lucas Licensing, a subsidiary of Lucasfilm, which owns the licensing rights to the Star Wars and Indiana Jones film series. Among the many initiatives launched by Roffman during his tenure as President of the division was the highly successful Star Wars: In Concert, a global arena tour that involved a full symphony orchestra and high definition video. Roffman served as Executive Producer. In early 2012, Roffman transitioned to the role of Senior Advisor, passing the baton to Paul Southern, who had worked for Roffman for 15 years. Later that year he was asked to return full-time to help manage the Star Wars franchise. Roffman has made several public appearances in connection with his work on Star Wars, including a speech at TEDx in 2010.

== Recognition ==
In 1997, Roffman was chosen Entertainment Marketer of the Year by Brandweek magazine; two years later he received the same recognition from the Entertainment and Promotional Marketing Association. In 2012, Roffman was inducted into the Licensing Hall of Fame of the International Licensing Industry Merchandisers' Association. According to Fortune, as of Disney's 2012 acquisition of Lucasfilm, total licensed retail sales, including action figures and video games, is over $25 billion; Star Wars has been the top toy brand for boys for six of the last seven years.

Star Wars licensing, under the leadership of Roffman, has been widely credited with redefining the licensed merchandise business and is regarded as a key element in the long-term success of the Star Wars brand. According to Fortune magazine, "George Lucas and his long-time licensing chief Howard Roffman more or less invented the playbook that major media companies, Disney chief among them, now depend on."

== Film work ==
Roffman serves as Executive Vice President of the Board of Directors of the San Francisco Film Society. In addition, he has helped to fund several critically acclaimed documentary films, including We Were Here: The AIDS Years in San Francisco, released in 2011, and Chasing Ice, released in 2012.

== Photography ==
As a photographer, Roffman is represented by Wessel + O'Connor Fine Art, a gallery specializing in fine vintage and contemporary photography. His published books of photography include the following:

- 1995: The Edge of Desire, ISBN 3-86187-129-7
- 1996: Three, ISBN 3-86187-066-5
- 1997: Tales, ISBN 3-86187-104-1
- 1998: Pictures of Fred, ISBN 3-86187-129-7
- 2000: Jagged Youth, ISBN 3-86187-163-7
- 2001: Johan Paulik, ISBN 3-86187-193-9
- 2002: Pictures of Kris, ISBN 3-86187-240-4
- 2002: Friends & Lovers, ISBN 3-86187-260-9
- 2003: The Perfect Boy, ISBN 3-86187-362-1
- 2004: Peter & Petr, ISBN 3-86187-656-6
- 2005: Loving Brian, ISBN 3-86187-956-5
- 2006: The Boys of Bel Ami, ISBN 3-86187-989-1
- 2007: Texas Twins, ISBN 978-3-86187-858-2
- 2008: Christopher and the Boys, ISBN 978-3-86787-007-8
- 2009: Private Moments – Bel Ami, ISBN 978-3-86787-037-5
- 2010: The Blush of Youth, ISBN 978-3-86787-145-7
- 2011: Paradise Found, ISBN 978-3-86787-163-1
- 2012: For the Love of Bali, ISBN 978-3-86787-239-3

== Historical writings ==
In 1975, at the age of 22, Roffman published a nonfiction book entitled Presumed Guilty: Lee Harvey Oswald in the Assassination of President Kennedy, the culmination of years of research that began when he was in high school. His second book, Understanding the Cold War: A Study of the Cold War in the Interwar Period, followed shortly thereafter in 1976.

== Personal life ==
Roffman lives in San Francisco.

== Works ==
- Presumed Guilty: Lee Harvey Oswald in the Assassination of President Kennedy. Fairleigh Dickinson University Press. 1975.
- Understanding the Cold War: A Study of the Cold War in the Interwar Period. Fairleigh Dickinson University Press. 1976. ISBN 978-0838617403.
