= Institute for Slavic Studies of the Russian Academy of Sciences =

Russian research institute

Coordinates: 55°42′38.86″N 37°34′40.13″E

Institute for Slavic Studies of the Russian Academy of Sciences (Russian: Институт славяноведения РАН)
- Founder: Federal Agency of Scientific Institutions
- Established: 1947
- Focus: Slavic studies
- President: Konstantin Nikiforov
- Formerly called: Institute for Slavic and Balcan Studies of the Academy of Sciences of the USSR
- Address: 119991 Moscow, Leninsky Prospekt 32A
- Location: Moscow, Russia
- Website: http://www.inslav.ru/

The Institute for Slavic Studies of the Russian Academy of Sciences (Russian: Институт славяноведения РАН) is an integral part of the Historical and Philological Studies Department of the Russian Academy of Sciences. It is focused on comprehensive studies of Slavic history, culture, literature, and languages.

== History ==
The Institute was founded in 1947 as the Institute for Slavic and Balcan Studies of the Academy of Sciences of the USSR. Since 1997, the Institute has its current name. Amongst the researchers of the Institute were Academicians of the RAS: Yulian Bromley, Nikolay Derzhavin, Boris Grekov, Gennady Litavrin, Dmitry Markov, Leonid Milov, Sergey Obnorsky, Vladimir Picheta, Yury Pisarev, Mikhail Tikhomirov, Nikita Tolstoy, Vladimir Toporov, and Oleg Trubachyov; Corresponding Members of the RAS: Tatiana Nikolaeva, Petr Tretyakov, Zinaida Udaltsova, and Vladimir Volkov. Currently, there are Academicians of the RAS: Vladimir Dybo, Vyacheslav Ivanov, and Andrey A. Zaliznyak; Foreign Member of the Serbian Academy of Sciences and Arts Anatolij A. Turilov; and Corresponding Members of the RAS: Aleksey Gippius and Boris Floria.

== Academic journals, yearbooks, and periodicals ==
The Institute for Slavic Studies publishes academic journals and periodicals:

Slavianovedenie

Slavianovedenie (Russian: Славяноведение, ISSN 0132-1366) is an academic journal published six times a year since 1965 (before 1992, Sovetskoe Slavianovedenie). Issues of the journal since 1965 till 2009 are available free on the website of the Institute.

Slověne

Slověne = Словѣне. International Journal of Slavic Studies (pISSN 2304-0785, eISSN 2305-6754) is a biannual peer-reviewed open-access academic journal since 2012.

Slavic Almanac (Russian: Славянский альманах, ISSN 2073-5731) is published since 1997.

Slavic World in the Third Millennium (Russian: Славянский мир в третьем тысячелетии) is a yearbook published since 2006.

Archaeographic Yearbook (Russian: Археографический ежегодник) has been published since 1957 by the Archaeographic Commission.

== Other yearbooks and periodicals ==
- The Slavic Linguistic Atlas (Russian: Общеславянский лингвистический атлас)
- Khazarian Almanac (Russian: Хазарский альманах)
- The Library of the Institute for Slavic Studies (Russian: Библиотека Института славяноведения РАН)
- Belarus and Ukraine: History and Culture (Russian: Белоруссия и Украина: история и культура)
- Studies in Slavic Dialectology (Russian: Исследования по славянской диалектологии)
