= BelAmi =

Slovak pornographic film studio

- Type: Private
- Industry: Gay pornography
- Founded: 1993; 33 years ago in Slovak Republic
- Founder: George Duroy
- Headquarters: Bratislava, Slovakia
- Products: Gay porn movies and internet
- Website: G-Rated Tour; Tour (NSFW)

BelAmi is a European gay pornographic film studio with offices in Bratislava, Prague and Budapest. It was established in 1993 by filmmaker George Duroy, a Slovak native who took his pseudonym from the protagonist Georges Duroy in Guy de Maupassant's novel Bel Ami. In addition to hardcore DVDs, BelAmi and Bruno Gmünder Verlag also produce calendars and photo books, such as Howard Roffman's Private Moments: Bel Ami (2009), and its performers are frequent headliners at nightclubs and similar venues around Europe, the United States, Australia, Canada, and elsewhere.

BelAmi has employed hundreds of actors over its history.

The studio has won numerous adult entertainment awards and nominations. BelAmi earned five 2010 XBIZ Awards citations, including LGBT studio of the year, and five nominations at the 2010 GayVN Awards, including best newcomer for Kris Evans. They won the award for best marketing—company image. In addition to numerous film accolades, BelAmi also received XBIZ Awards in 2013 and 2014 for Gay Site of the Year, in 2015 for Gay Studio of the Year, and the 2016 XBIZ Award for Adult Site of the Year – Gay. George Duroy, as well as marquee performers Lukas Ridgeston and Johan Paulik, have been inducted into the GayVN Awards Hall of Fame.

== Selected films ==
- Frisky Summer 1,2,3 (1995, 1996, 1998)
- An American in Prague (1997)
- The 101 Men series (1998–2002)
- The Personal Trainers series (2001–present)
- Greek Holiday (2004)
- Lukas in Love (2005)
- The Private Life of Brandon Manilow (2008)
- French Kiss (2008)
- Seriously Sexy (2009)
- 5 Americans in Prague (2009)
- Todd and Dolph (2010)
- Skin on Skin (2010)
- Step by Step: The Education of Porn Star: Kris Evans (2010)
- Step by Step: The Education of a Porn Star: Jean-Daniel Chagall (2010)
- Taboo (2010)
- Bel Ami 3D (2011)
- Kinky Angels 1: Kevin Warhol (2011)
- Kris Evans: Up & Close (2011)
- Irresistible (2012)
- Sword Fight! (2012)
- An American in Prague in 3D (2013)
- Fucking Kris Series (2014)

== See also ==
- List of male performers in gay porn films
- List of pornographic film studios#Studios that include male-male and male-TG sex
- List of pornographic magazines#Marketed to gay and bisexual men

== Bibliography ==
- Bel Ami : best of Johan, Bruno Gmunder, 2000, ISBN 978-3-86187-186-6, OCLC 44934457
- Images of desire : models by Bel Ami, Pro-Fun, 2000, ISBN 978-3-931613-01-3, OCLC 43338133
- Bel Ami : Summertime, Bruno Gmunder, 2000, ISBN 978-3-86187-171-2, OCLC 43879014
- Sebastian & friends, B. Gmünder, 2004, ISBN 978-3-86187-647-2, OCLC 58421500
- Roffman, Howard (2006), The boys of Bel Ami, B. Gmünder, ISBN 978-3-86187-989-3, OCLC 85179207
- Roffman, Howard (2009), Private moments: Bel Ami, B. Gmünder, ISBN 978-3-86787-037-5, OCLC 437036065
- Roffman, Howard (2010), The blush of youth, B. Gmünder, ISBN 978-3-86787-145-7, OCLC 85179207
- Roffman, Howard (2012), For the love of Bali, B. Gmünder, ISBN 978-3-86787-239-3, OCLC 772975365
- Bel Ami : 69 Positions of Joyful Gay Sex, Bruno Gmunder Verlag, 2012, ISBN 978-3-86787-261-4, archived from the original on 2012-10-24
- Joan Crisol : Bel Ami Rebels, Bruno Gmunder Verlag, 2012, ISBN 978-3-86787-425-0, archived from the original on 2013-01-20
