= Slayyyter discography =

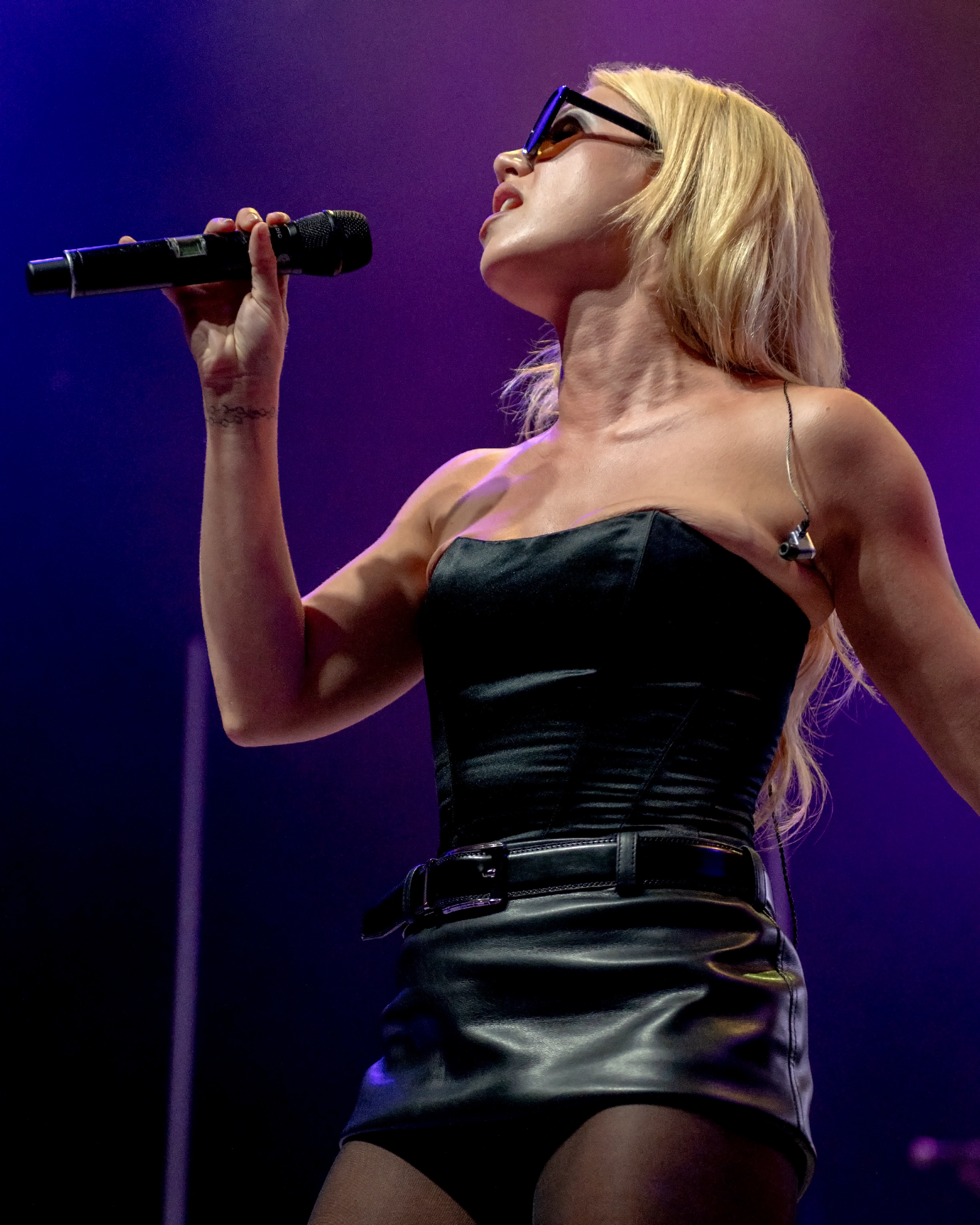
- Slayyyter performing at the Greek Theatre during Fletcher's In Search of the Antidote Tour in 2024
- Studio albums: 3
- EPs: 1
- Mixtapes: 1
- Singles: 26
- Promotional singles: 4

American singer-songwriter Slayyyter has released three studio albums, one mixtape, one extended play (EP), 26 singles (including four as a featured artist), and three promotional singles. She initially began her career by independently releasing music to SoundCloud in 2018. Her breakthrough came with the viral success of her early tracks, which led to her self-titled debut mixtape, being independently issued in September 2019. Her single "Daddy AF" was later featured in the comedy horror film Bodies Bodies Bodies (2022) and the comedy-drama Anora (2024).

In June 2021, Slayyyter released her debut studio album, Troubled Paradise, through Fader. Her second studio album, Starfucker, followed in September 2023 and earned her first entry on a Billboard chart, peaking at number 10 on the US Top Dance/Electronic Albums chart. After signing with Columbia Records, she released her third studio album, Worst Girl in America, in March 2026, which became her first record to crossover onto several international mainstream charts, peaking at number 22 on the US Billboard 200, number one on the US Dance chart, and reaching the top 40 in Australia, New Zealand, and the United Kingdom.

== Albums ==
=== Studio albums ===
List of studio albums, with selected details
Title	Release details	Peak chart positions						
Title	Release details	US	US Dance	AUS	BEL (FL)	IRE	NZ	UK
Troubled Paradise	Released: June 11, 2021; Label: Fader; Format: Digital download, streaming, LP, CD	—	—	—	—	—	—	—
Starfucker	Released: September 22, 2023; Label: Fader; Format: Digital download, streaming, LP, CD	—	10	—	—	—	—	—
Worst Girl in America	Released: March 27, 2026; Label: Records, Columbia; Format: Digital download, streaming, LP, CD	22	1	28	140	46	23	36
Worst Man in America	Scheduled: December 4, 2026; Label: Records, Columbia; Format: Digital download, streaming, LP, CD	To be released						
"—" denotes a recording that did not chart or was not released in that territory.

=== Mixtapes ===
List of mixtapes, with selected details
Title	Release details
Slayyyter	Release date: September 17, 2019; Label: Self-released; Format: Digital download, streaming, LP, CD

== Extended plays ==
List of extended plays, with selected details
Title	Release details
Inferno Euphoria	Release date: January 28, 2022; Label: Fader; Format: Digital download, streaming

== Singles ==
=== As lead artist ===
List of singles as lead artist
Title	Year	Peak chart positions										Album
Title	Year	US	US Dance Pop	AUS	CAN	EST Air.	IRE	LTU	NZ Hot	SWI	UK	Album
"BFF" (featuring Ayesha Erotica)	2018	—	—	—	—	—	—	—	—	—	—	Slayyyter
"Candy"	2018	—	—	—	—	—	—	—	—	—	—	Slayyyter
"I'm High"	2018	—	—	—	—	—	—	—	—	—	—	Non-album singles
"Platform Shoes"	2018	—	—	—	—	—	—	—	—	—	—	Non-album singles
"Hello Kitty"	2018	—	—	—	—	—	—	—	—	—	—	Non-album singles
"Mine"	2019	—	—	—	—	—	—	—	—	—	—	Slayyyter
"Daddy AF"	2019	—	—	—	—	—	—	—	—	—	—	Slayyyter
"Crush on U" (with Donatachi)	2019	—	—	—	—	—	—	—	—	—	—	Taste
"Self Destruct" (featuring Wuki)	2020	—	—	—	—	—	—	—	—	—	—	Troubled Paradise
"Troubled Paradise"	2021	—	—	—	—	—	—	—	—	—	—	Troubled Paradise
"Clouds"	2021	—	—	—	—	—	—	—	—	—	—	Troubled Paradise
"Cowboys"	2021	—	—	—	—	—	—	—	—	—	—	Troubled Paradise
"Over This!"	2021	—	—	—	—	—	—	—	—	—	—	Troubled Paradise
"Stupid Boy" (featuring Big Freedia)	2021	—	—	—	—	—	—	—	—	—	—	Non-album single
"Out of Time"	2023	—	—	—	—	—	—	—	—	—	—	Starfucker
"Miss Belladonna"	2023	—	—	—	—	—	—	—	—	—	—	Starfucker
"Erotic Electronic"	2023	—	—	—	—	—	—	—	—	—	—	Starfucker
"I Love Hollywood!"	2023	—	—	—	—	—	—	—	—	—	—	Starfucker
"Makeup" (Note: "Makeup" appears on the deluxe edition of Starfucker.) (featuring Lolo Zouaï)	2023	—	—	—	—	—	—	—	—	—	—	Starfucker
"No Comma"	2024	—	—	—	—	—	—	—	—	—	—	Non-album single
"Attention!" (with Kesha and Rose Gray)	2025	—	—	—	—	—	—	—	—	—	—	. (...)
"Beat Up Chanels"	2025	—	—	—	—	—	—	—	—	—	—	Worst Girl in America
"Cannibalism!"	2025	—	—	—	—	—	—	—	—	—	—	Worst Girl in America
"Crank"	2025	—	12	—	—	—	—	—	—	—	—	Worst Girl in America
"Dance..."	2026	— (Note: "Dance..." did not enter the Billboard Hot 100, but peaked at number 8 on the Bubbling Under Hot 100 chart.)	7	—	88	42	68	23	—	49	86	Worst Girl in America
"Old Technology"	2026	—	—	—	—	—	—	—	—	—	—	Worst Girl in America
"Broke Bitch Freestyle"	2026	—	—	—	—	—	—	—	30	—	—	Non-album single
"Brand New Chanels"	2026	98	5	94	72	30	26	— (Note: "Brand New Chanels" did not enter the AGATA Singlų Top 100, but peaked at number 68 on the TopHit Lithuanian Airplay.)	5	—	50	Worst Man in America
"Crank 2"	2026	—	9	—	—	—	—	—	4	—	—	Worst Man in America
"I Think He's Got a Girl"	2026	— (Note: "I Think He's Got a Girl" did not enter the Billboard Hot 100, but peaked at number 8 on the Bubbling Under Hot 100 chart.)	6	—	—	80	61	— (Note: "I Think He's Got a Girl" did not enter the AGATA Singlų Top 100, but peaked at number 58 on the TopHit Lithuanian Airplay.)	2	—	90	Worst Man in America
"Hey Boyyy"	2026	— (Note: "Hey Boyyy" did not enter the Billboard Hot 100, but peaked at number 18 on the Bubbling Under Hot 100 chart.)	6	—	—	—	—	—	6	—	—	Worst Man in America
"—" denotes a recording that did not chart or was not released in that territory.

=== As featured artist ===
List of singles as a featured artist
Title	Year	Album
"Faded" (Boy Sim featuring Slayyyter)	2018	Pink Noise
"Dial Tone" (That Kid featuring Ayesha Erotica and Slayyyter)	2018	Non-album single
"Final Girl" (Graveyardguy featuring Slayyyter)	2018	Here Lies Graveyardguy
"Diamond in the Dark" (Liz featuring Slayyyter)	2019	Planet Y2K
"2003" (Robokid featuring Slayyyter)	2019	Sportsangel
"Read My Mind" (Rebecca Black featuring Slayyyter)	2021	Non-album single
"Hatefuck" (Pussy Riot featuring Slayyyter)	2022	Matriarchy Now
"Honest" (Peking Duk featuring Slayyyter)	2022	Non-album single
"Never Like Me" (Devault featuring Slayyyter and Tommy Genesis)	2024	Sensation
"Behind the Wheel" (Devault featuring Slayyyter)	2024	Sensation
"Thrill of the Night" (Sébastien Tellier featuring Slayyyter and Nile Rodgers)	2025	Kiss the Beast
"Fire Away" (Madeon featuring Slayyyter)	2026	Victory

=== Promotional singles ===
List of other charted songs, with chart position, showing year released and album name
Title	Year	Peak chart positions	Album
Title	Year	EST Air.	Album
"Ghost"	2018	—	Slayyyter
"Alone"	2018	—	Slayyyter
"All I Want for Xxxmas" (featuring Ayesha Erotica)	2018	—	Non-album singles
"Everytime"	2019	—	Non-album singles
"Cha Ching"	2019	—	Slayyyter
"Click" (No Boys Remix) (Charli XCX featuring Kim Petras and Slayyyter)	2019	—	Non-album single
"Throatzillaaa"	2020	—	Troubled Paradise
"Dog House"	2021	—	Troubled Paradise
"Monster" (Spotify Singles)	2023	—	Non-album single
"Gas Station"	2026	76	Worst Girl in America
"Brittany Murphy."	2026	—	Worst Girl in America
"—" denotes a recording that did not chart or was not released in that territory.

== Other charted songs ==
List of other charted songs, with chart position, showing year released and album name
Title	Year	Peak chart positions	Album
Title	Year	US Dance Pop	Album
"Yes Goddd"	2026	13	Worst Girl in America

== Music videos ==
List of music videos, showing year released and directors
Title	Year	Director(s)	Album
"Daddy AF"	2019	Logan Fields	Slayyyter
"Candy"	2019	Revolving Style	Slayyyter
"Mine"	2019	SLEEPxTITE & Revolving Style	Slayyyter
"Daddy AF (Wuki Remix)"	2020	SLEEPxTITE & Revolving Style	Non-album single
"Self Destruct"	2020	Brent McKeever	Troubled Paradise
"Troubled Paradise"	2021	Munachi Osegbu	Troubled Paradise
"Clouds"	2021	Munachi Osegbu	Troubled Paradise
"Cowboys"	2021	Revolving Style	Troubled Paradise
"Erotic Electronic"	2023	Slayyyter and Kaitlyn Muro	Starfucker
"I Love Hollywood!"	2023	Slayyyter and Kaitlyn Muro	Starfucker
"Beat Up Chanels"	2025	Slayyyter and Hannah De Vries	Worst Girl in America
"Cannibalism!"	2025	Slayyyter	Worst Girl in America
"Crank"	2025	Slayyyter	Worst Girl in America
"Dance..."	2026	Slayyyter	Worst Girl in America
"Old Technology"	2026	Slayyyter	Worst Girl in America
"Old Flings"	2026	Slayyyter	Worst Girl in America
"Gas Station"	2026	Slayyyter	Worst Girl in America
"Yes Goddd"	2026	Slayyyter	Worst Girl in America
"Unknown Loverz"	2026	Slayyyter	Worst Girl in America
"I'm Actually Kinda Famous"	2026	Slayyyter	Worst Girl in America
"St. Loser"	2026	Slayyyter	Worst Girl in America
"What Is It Like, to Be Liked?"	2026	Slayyyter	Worst Girl in America
"*Prayer*"	2026	Slayyyter	Worst Girl in America
"Brand New Chanels"	2026	Slayyyter	Worst Man in America
"Crank 2"	2026	Slayyyter	Worst Man in America
