= Worst Girl in the World Tour =

2026 concert tour by Slayyyter

- Tour by Slayyyter
- Location: Europe; North America; Australia; South America
- Associated album: Worst Girl in America
- Start date: July 26, 2026
- End date: October 20, 2026
- No. of shows: 49
- Supporting acts: 2charm; Pearly Drops; Kalika
Slayyyter tour chronology
Club Valentine (2023–2024)	Worst Girl in the World Tour (2026)

Worst Girl in the World Tour (stylized as WOR$T GIRL IN THE WORLD TOUR) was the fourth headlining concert tour by American singer-songwriter Slayyyter to promote her third studio album Worst Girl in America (2026).

== Background and promotion ==
Marquee announcing a concert at the Fox Oakland Theatre.

The tour was announced on March 16, 2026, with dates in Europe, South America, and North America being released and general sales opened on March 20, 2026. Slayyyter additionally partnered with a non-profit organization so that a dollar from every ticket sold will go to local LGBTQ+ organizations in each city. The Australian leg of the tour and more shows in North America were announced on April 30, 2026, with both general sales opened on May 8, 2026.

== Reception ==
XO Diva D, reviewing the opening night, said the tour "blended confessional pop, glitter-soaked chaos, and a first taste of what’s next". They also commented, "The stage design drew clear parallels to her Coachella setup, leaning into an aesthetic that only Slayyyter could pull off. It felt both tongue-in-cheek and meticulously crafted, matching the tone of a performance that balances irony with genuine emotion".

== Set list ==
This set list is from the July 26, 2026 concert in St. Louis. It may not represent all concerts for the duration of the tour.

Act I

1. "*Prayer*"
2. "Dance..."
3. "Old Flings"
4. "Old Technology"
5. "Broke Bitch Freestyle"
6. "Crank"
7. "Crank 2"
8. "Yes Goddd"

Act II

9. "Cannibalism!"
10. "Nekromantik!"
11. "Gas Station"
12. "Unknown Loverz"
13. "I Think He's Got a Girl"
14. "I'm Actually Kinda Famous"
15. "St. Loser"

Act III

16. "*Demonic Prayer*"
17. "What Is It Like, To Be Liked?"
18. "Brittany Murphy."

Encore

20. "Brand New Chanels"
21. "Beat Up Chanels"

=== Lollapalooza show ===
This set list is from the July 31, 2026 concert in Chicago.

1. "*Prayer*"
2. "Dance..."
3. "Old Flings"
4. "Old Technology"
5. "Crank"
6. "Yes Goddd"
7. "Cannibalism!"
8. "I'm Actually Kinda Famous"
9. "St. Loser"
10. "Brittany Murphy."
11. "Brand New Chanels"
12. "Beat Up Chanels"

== Tour dates ==
List of concerts, showing date, city, country and venue
Date (2026)	City	Country	Venue	Supporting act(s)
July 26	St. Louis	United States	The Pageant	—N/a
July 27	St. Louis	United States	The Pageant	—N/a
July 29	St. Louis	United States	The Pageant	—N/a
July 30 (Note: The July 30, 2026 concert in Chicago is a part of Lollapalooza aftershow concert lineup.)	Chicago	United States	The Salt Shed	—N/a
July 31 (Note: The July 31, 2026 concert in Chicago is a part of Lollapalooza.)	Chicago	United States	Grant Park	—N/a
August 9	Sydney	Australia	Enmore Theatre	2charm
August 10	Sydney	Australia	Enmore Theatre	2charm
August 14	Brisbane	Australia	Fortitude Music Hall	2charm
August 17	Melbourne	Australia	Forum	2charm
August 18	Melbourne	Australia	Forum	2charm
August 23	Los Angeles	United States	Shrine Expo Hall	Pearly Drops
August 24	Los Angeles	United States	Shrine Expo Hall	Pearly Drops
August 29 (Note: The August 29, 2026 concert in Reading is a part of Reading Festival.)	Reading	England	Little John's Farm	—N/a
August 30 (Note: The August 30, 2026 concert in Leeds is a part of Leeds Festival.)	Leeds	England	Bramham Park	—N/a
September 3	Vancouver	Canada	Commodore Ballroom (Note: The venue for the show on September 3, 2026 in Vancouver was upgraded from Hollywood Theatre, following high demand.)	Pearly Drops
September 4	Seattle	United States	The Showbox	Pearly Drops
September 5	Portland	United States	Crystal Ballroom (Note: The venue for the show on September 5, 2026 in Portland was upgraded from Wonder Ballroom, following high demand.)	Pearly Drops
September 8	San Francisco	United States	Regency Ballroom	Pearly Drops
September 9	Oakland	United States	Fox Oakland Theater	Pearly Drops
September 12	San Diego	United States	SOMA	Pearly Drops
September 14	Phoenix	United States	The Van Buren	Pearly Drops
September 17	Austin	United States	Emo's (Note: The venue for the show on September 17, 2026 in Austin was upgraded from Mohawk, following high demand.)	Pearly Drops
September 18	Houston	United States	White Oak Music Hall	Pearly Drops
September 19	Dallas	United States	House of Blues Dallas (Note: The venue for the show on September 19, 2026 in Dallas was upgraded from The Echo Music Hall, following high demand.)	Pearly Drops
September 21	Atlanta	United States	The Eastern	Pearly Drops
September 22	Nashville	United States	Brooklyn Bowl	Pearly Drops
September 24	Philadelphia	United States	The Fillmore	Pearly Drops
September 25 (Note: The September 25, 2026 concert in Columbia is a part of All Things Go Music Festival.)	Columbia	United States	Merriweather Post Pavilion	—N/a
September 26	Boston	United States	Roadrunner	Pearly Drops
September 29	Boston	United States	Roadrunner	Pearly Drops
September 30	Montreal	Canada	Beanfield Theatre	Pearly Drops
October 1	Toronto	Canada	The Danforth Music Hall	Pearly Drops
October 3	New York	United States	Terminal 5	Pearly Drops
October 4	Brooklyn	United States	Brooklyn Paramount	Pearly Drops
October 9	Rio de Janeiro	Brazil	ZIG Festival	—N/a
October 10	São Paulo	Brazil	ZIG Festival	—N/a
October 18	Paris	France	Le Trianon	Kalika
October 19	Amsterdam	Netherlands	Paradiso	Kalika
October 20	Cologne	Germany	Die Kantine	Kalika

=== Cancelled shows ===
List of cancelled concerts
Date (2026)	City	Country	Venue	Reason	Ref.
October 22	Copenhagen	Denmark	Vega	Laryngitis and vocal cord tears	
October 23	Hamburg	Germany	Fabrik	Laryngitis and vocal cord tears	
October 24	Warsaw	Poland	Palladium Club	Laryngitis and vocal cord tears	
October 26	Prague	Czechia	Lucerna Music Bar	Laryngitis and vocal cord tears	
October 27	Berlin	Germany	Metropol	Laryngitis and vocal cord tears	
October 28	Antwerp	Belgium	Trix	Laryngitis and vocal cord tears	
October 30	Manchester	England	Albert Hall, Manchester	Laryngitis and vocal cord tears	
October 31	Birmingham	England	Digbeth Institute	Laryngitis and vocal cord tears	
November 1	Glasgow	Scotland	O2 Academy Glasgow	Laryngitis and vocal cord tears	
November 3	Brighton	England	Chalk Venue	Laryngitis and vocal cord tears	
November 5	London	England	Roundhouse	Laryngitis and vocal cord tears	
