= Touch My Body (disambiguation) =

"Touch My Body" is a 2008 song by Mariah Carey.

Touch My Body may also refer to:

- "Touch My Body", a song by Sam Kim from the 2016 EP I Am Sam
- "Touch My Body", a song by Sistar from the 2014 EP Touch N Move
- "Touch My Body", a song by Slayyyter from the 2019 mixtape Slayyyter
