= WMIA =

WMIA may refer to:

- WMIA (AM), a radio station (1070 AM) licensed to Arecibo, Puerto Rico
- WMIA-FM, a radio station (93.9 FM) licensed to Miami Beach, Florida
- Worst Man in America, 2026 album by Slayyyter
