= I Think He's Got a Girl =

2026 single by Slayyyter

Single by Slayyyter

from the album Worst Man in America
- Released: October 9, 2026
- Length: 3:34
- Label: Columbia
- Songwriters: Slayyyter; Austin Corona; Violet Skies; Wyatt Bernard
- Producers: Austin Corona; Wyatt Bernard

Slayyyter singles chronology
"Crank 2" (2026)	"I Think He's Got a Girl" (2026)	"Hey Boyyy" (2026)

Music video
- "I Think He's Got a Girl" on YouTube

"I Think He's Got a Girl" (stylized in all lowercase) is a song by American singer-songwriter Slayyyter. It was released on October 9, 2026, through Columbia Records as the third single from Worst Man in America (2026). The song is the inverse of "Unknown Loverz".

== Background and release ==
On October 5, 2026, Slayyyter announced Worst Man in America, a nine-track album described as a companion to her 2026 album Worst Girl in America. The record was announced for release on December 4, 2026, through Columbia Records. "I Think He's Got a Girl" was included on the album's track listing.

Slayyyter teased the song on social media on October 6, two days before its official release. The song was also performed live ahead of its release during the Worst Girl in the World Tour.

According to a release announcement by Sony Music Poland, the song explores suspicion, uncertainty and emotional vulnerability within a romantic relationship.

== Music video ==
A music video for "I Think He's Got a Girl" directed by Slayyyter herself was released alongside the song on October 9, 2026. Its visuals contrast a glamorous, vintage Hollywood-inspired appearance with imagery drawing on Midwestern American culture. In the visual, Slayyyter wears a white halter swimsuit reminiscent of Marilyn Monroe and a dress made from raccoon pelt beside a flaming grill.

== Charts ==
Chart performance for "I Think He's Got a Girl"
Chart (2026)	Peak position
Estonia Airplay (TopHit)	80
Ireland (IRMA)	61
Japan Hot Overseas (Billboard Japan)	6
Lithuania Airplay (TopHit)	58
New Zealand Hot Singles (RMNZ)	2
UK Singles (Official Charts)	90
US Bubbling Under Hot 100 (Billboard)	8
US Hot Dance/Pop Songs (Billboard)	6
