= Hey Boyyy =

2026 single by Slayyyter

Single by Slayyyter

from the album Worst Man in America
- Released: November 6, 2026
- Genre: Bloghouse
- Length: 4:39
- Label: Columbia
- Songwriters: Slayyyter; Austin Corona; Wyatt Bernard
- Producers: Austin Corona; Wyatt Bernard

Slayyyter singles chronology
"I Think He's Got a Girl" (2026)	"Hey Boyyy" (2026)

Music video
- "Hey Boyyy" on YouTube

"Hey Boyyy" (stylized in all lowercase) is a song by American singer-songwriter Slayyyter. It was released on November 6, 2026, through Columbia Records as the fourth single from Worst Man in America (2026). A lyrical inverse to her song "Old Flings", the track has a similar title to "Yes Goddd", both released as part of Worst Girl in America (2026).

== Critical reception ==
Clash called the song "Slayyyter at her most up-front and infectious, a moment of pure directness from a vivid pop talent".

== Music video ==
The self directed music video features Slayyyter going on dates with a metallic gold skeleton in Paris, France. Paste theorized that the skeleton symbolizes that her love is "dead on arrival" in reference to the breakup that inspired the whole album.

== Charts ==
Chart performance for "Hey Boyyy"
Chart (2026)	Peak position
Australia New Music Singles (ARIA)	20
New Zealand Hot Singles (RMNZ)	6
US Bubbling Under Hot 100 (Billboard)	18
US Hot Dance/Pop Songs (Billboard)	6
