= Crank 2 =

2026 single by Slayyyter

Single by Slayyyter

from the album Worst Man in America
- Released: September 10, 2026
- Genre: Hyperpop
- Length: 3:19
- Label: Columbia
- Songwriters: Slayyyter; Austin Corona; Wyatt Bernard
- Producers: Austin Corona; Wyatt Bernard

Slayyyter singles chronology
"Brand New Chanels" (2026)	"Crank 2" (2026)	"I Think He's Got a Girl" (2026)

Music video
- "Crank 2" on YouTube

"Crank 2" (stylized in all lowercase) is a song by the American singer-songwriter Slayyyter. It released on September 10, 2026, through Columbia Records as the second single to her upcoming fourth studio album Worst Man in America (2026). The track is a sequel to her song "Crank" (2025).

== Composition and lyrics ==
Described as a hyperpop song, "Crank 2" continues the lyrical talking point from "Brand New Chanels" about being cheated on days after Worst Girl in America was released.

== Promotion ==
The song was first performed during Slayyyter's Worst Girl in the World Tour, where she also debuted "Brand New Chanels" and two other unreleased songs. Slayyyter began teasing the music video for the track in a tweet on September 7.

== Reception ==
Multiple reviewers noticed the intensity of Slayyyter's vocals and the song's subject matter, with Larisha Paul of Rolling Stone saying she sounded "more sinister and infinitely more pissed off" and Paste's Abby Jones remarking that the song felt like a "dizzying, ominous threat".

== Music video ==
A music video directed by Slayyyter herself was premiered and released alongside the single. The video features Slayyyter alongside a group of dancers performing a "militant" dance routine alongside an American flag with Slayyyter's logo on it. It is inspired by her upbringing in St. Louis, Missouri and the tornado sirens she heard there. Initially wanting to film with a real tornado, the idea was rejected. The video was filmed in the desert the day before Slayyyter's show in St. Louis.

== Charts ==
Chart performance
Chart (2026)	Peak position
New Zealand Hot Singles (RMNZ)	4
US Hot Dance/Pop Songs (Billboard)	9

== Release history ==
Release dates and formats
Region	Date	Format(s)	Label	Ref.
Various	September 10, 2026	Music download; streaming	Columbia	
