= Brand New Chanels =

2026 single by Slayyyter

Single by Slayyyter

from the album Worst Man in America
- Released: July 31, 2026
- Genre: Dance-pop
- Length: 3:58
- Label: Columbia
- Songwriters: Slayyyter; Austin Corona; Wyatt Bernard
- Producers: Austin Corona; Wyatt Bernard

Slayyyter singles chronology
| "Fire Away" (2026) | "Brand New Chanels" (2026) | "Crank 2" (2026) |

Music video
- "Brand New Chanels" on YouTube

"Brand New Chanels" (stylized as "brand new chanel$") is a song by American singer-songwriter Slayyyter. It was released on July 31, 2026 through Columbia Records as the lead single to her fourth studio album Worst Man in America (2026). The track was released almost exactly a year after "Beat Up Chanels", the lead single from Worst Girl in America, which it directly inverses.

On the week dated August 15, 2026, “Brand New Chanels” debuted on the Billboard Hot 100 chart at 98, marking her first song to debut on a mainstream Billboard chart.

== Background ==
The song is based on a breakup Slayyyter experienced only a few days before the release of Worst Girl in America. "It was like two days before my album dropped, I found out I got cheated on in my house while I was rehearsing for Coachella in L.A", said Slayyyter, who additionally explained that the split was difficult because the pair lived together in New York City.

== Composition and lyrics ==
The lyrics of the song center on heartache, focusing on a cheater who slept with a girl in the space they shared with Slayyyter while she was away on tour. It has been described by critics as a "glossy" and "shimmery" dance-pop breakup anthem.

The lyrics confront the betrayal, described by Slayyyter as "unforgivable as always", that leaves her unsure of what to do. "At those nasty little afterparties, stuck in the scene/He want brand new Chanels", referring to the new love interest of her boyfriend as a fake relationship. Slayyyter seems to triumphantly put her foot down on the cheating with lines "What a chop, I cut you off and get away/I'm better off". However, she repeats during the chorus how she's stuck in the aftermath of betrayal, digesting it, with the literal line "I see how you move/But I'm here standing still".

The song's outro repurposes the chorus of "Beat Up Chanels" as a counter-melody and adapts some of its lyrics in an accusatory kiss-off to an ex-lover, relegated to "those nasty little after-parties, stuck in the scene".

== Promotion and release ==
=== Artwork ===
The artwork released for the single features the upper body of Slayyyter, an inverse to the lower body seen in "Beat Up Chanels", and sees her celebrating as fireworks go off in the background.

=== Marketing ===
On July 27, 2026, Slayyyter posted a short snippet of her performing the song live with the tagline, "brand new chanel$ out friday", with the message below stating "I love my hometown so much. I can't wait to do it all over again".

== Reception ==
Nylon said "This song is so obviously in conversation with the tracks on its sister album, while still being its own thing; the slow build into the adrenaline rush of a chorus, the searing vocals, and the sugary synths could all find a place on Worst Girl in America, yet somehow, it doesn’t feel like she’s trying to recreate the magic of that record at all". Jon Stickler, writing for Stereoboard, said, "The empowering, high-energy dance-pop track pairs club-ready beats with the St. Louis pop star's unapologetic attitude".

The Fader described the track as "girl who’s going to be okay pop", which is based on an internet meme, and said the song was "all lights and sparkles" compared to its sister track "Beat Up Chanels". Similarly to The Fader review, BrooklynVegan described the song as "a little more uplifting" than its predecessor. Hannah Jocelyn of Pitchfork concurred, labelling the track "basically a Katy Perry song" which "maximizes the mainstream pop of the 2010s", highlighting "Teenage Dream" and "Your Love Is My Drug" as particular reference points. The track's sense of "euphoric relief" is comparable, for Jocelyn, to "Since U Been Gone"; the chorus, however, "recalls '90s techno" such as "Born Slippy". Jocelyn concludes that Slayyyter "ascends on her own terms" beyond the sound of Worst Girl in America.

== Music video ==
A music video was premiered and released alongside the single. Directed by Slayyyter herself, it features shots between a high school football field, a compound in the desert, and the interior of a trailer, where she is dressed in clad attire. The music video ends with fireworks similarly to the cover art, while additionally, pays homage to the music video for "Beat Up Chanels" and the artwork for her album, Worst Girl in America (2026), with a scene where Slayyyter recreates the album's artwork with a trucker hat that instead it reads "Worst Man in America".

== Live performances ==
The song was played live for the first time on the opening date of the Worst Girl in the World Tour, being played directly before "Beat Up Chanels" as the penultimate song in the setlist.

== Charts ==
=== Weekly charts ===
Weekly chart performance
| Chart (2026) | Peak position |
|---|---|
| Australia (ARIA) | 94 |
| Estonia Airplay (TopHit) | 30 |
| Ireland (IRMA) | 26 |
| Lithuania Airplay (TopHit) | 68 |
| New Zealand Hot Singles (RMNZ) | 5 |
| UK Singles (Official Charts) | 50 |
| US Billboard Hot 100 | 98 |
| US Dance Airplay (Billboard) | 37 |
| US Hot Dance/Pop Songs (Billboard) | 5 |

=== Monthly charts ===
Monthly chart performance
| Chart (2026) | Peak position |
|---|---|
| Estonia Airplay (TopHit) | 50 |
| Lithuania Airplay (TopHit) | 91 |

== Release history ==
| Region | Date | Format(s) | Version | Label | Ref. |
|---|---|---|---|---|---|
| Various | July 31, 2026 | Digital download; streaming | Original | Columbia | |
