= Starfucker (Slayyyter album) =

2023 studio album by Slayyyter

- Standard edition cover

Studio album by Slayyyter
- Released: September 22, 2023
- Recorded: 2021–2023
- Genres: Electropop; dance-pop
- Length: 35:16
- Label: Fader
- Producers: Baej Lambeaux; Aaron Joseph; Chris Lyon; Nicopop; Vaughn Oliver; Jordan Palmer; Valley Girl

Slayyyter chronology
Troubled Paradise (2021)	Starfucker (2023)	Worst Girl in America (2026)

Singles from Starfucker
- 1. "Out of Time" Released: June 9, 2023; 2. "Miss Belladonna" Released: July 21, 2023; 3. "Erotic Electronic" Released: August 18, 2023; 4. "I Love Hollywood!" Released: September 22, 2023

Starfucker is the second studio album by American singer and songwriter Slayyyter. It was released on September 22, 2023 through Fader. An '80s-influenced electronic pop record, Starfucker explores a "dramatized" and satirical view of Hollywood, focusing on the culture of drugs, vanity, and celebrity. A deluxe edition of the album was released on December 1, 2023.

Slayyyter worked primarily alongside Nicopop, who produced "Clouds" for the album's predecessor, Troubled Paradise (2021). Previous collaborators Valley Girl and Jordan Palmer returned to produce tracks for the album, alongside her touring DJ Owen Jackson, and new collaborators Vaughn Oliver, Aaron Joseph, Baej Lambeux, Jacob Decoteau, and Chris Lyon.

It is Slayyyter's first charting album, debuting at number 17 on Billboard's Top Dance/Electronic Albums chart and peaking at number 10. The album received positive reviews from critics.

== Background and development ==
Slayyyter released her debut studio album Troubled Paradise on June 11, 2021, to generally positive reviews. She described the album as "very thrown together", and sought to expand her musical tastes for a new project. She wrote nearly 200 songs for the album. Inspired by old Hollywood tropes and her own experience moving to Los Angeles to pursue a music career, she wrote songs that invoke celebrity and 80s and 90s films. She cited the erotic thrillers Blue Velvet (1986), Body Double (1984), and Basic Instinct (1992) as visual and lyrical references. She used "broody synths" to create darker music, inspired by the American electronic duo Boy Harsher. The album's title came from a conversation Slayyyter had with Jackson about the music industry, in which he'd referred to someone the pair knew as a "starfucker". Slayyyter also said she wanted to make the album for her "17-year-old self," inspired by a quote from Virgil Abloh.

The entirety of the album, as well as an estimated "50–60 [demo] songs", leaked online ahead of Starfucker's release. Scrapped songs for the album include a track sampling "Stereo Love" by Romanian musicians Edward Maya and Vika Jigulina, which Slayyyter and her label were unable to release due to costly sample clearance fees.

Slayyyter has since stated how developing Starfucker had her anticipating finally gaining mass appeal, attempting to reach mainstream success, with a sound lacking certain elements present on her previous releases to capture a larger audience. The lack of commercial success later fueled her leaving Fader Label, and starting a brief hiatus before building upon a personal-rooted soundscape with Worst Girl in America (2026).

== Composition ==
Starfucker is a sonic departure from Slayyyter's previous hyperpop style, combining a more conventional, pop sound with club music styles such as techno and electroclash.

=== Songs ===
According to Slayyyter, the lyrics of "I Love Hollywood!" are partly derived from her own experiences, but also satire of celebrity culture.

== Singles and promotion ==
"Out Of Time" was released as the album's first single on June 9, 2023. This was followed by "Miss Belladonna" on July 21, 2023, coinciding with the announcement of the album. "Erotic Electronic" was released as the album's third single on August 18, 2023, alongside a music video where Slayyyter walks naked down Hollywood Boulevard. The release of fourth single "I Love Hollywood!" coincided with its music video and the album's release on September 22, 2023.

Slayyyter debuted tracks from Starfucker in her set at Life Is Beautiful Music & Art Festival in Las Vegas on September 22, 2023.

"Makeup" featuring French-born American singer Lolo Zouaï was released on November 10, 2023, as a promotional single to promote the deluxe edition of the album, which was released on December 1, 2023.

== Critical reception ==
Professional ratings
Review scores
Source	Rating
The Line of Best Fit	9/10
Sputnikmusic	4.5/5

The album received positive reviews from music critics. Caitlin Chatterton of The Line of Best Fit gave the album a 9/10 review, declaring it "an express delivery of utterly skipless dance belters". PopBuzz ranked Starfucker at #17 in their ranking of the best albums of 2023, described by Sam Prance as "one of the best explorations of fame in pop since Lady Gaga's The Fame". Paper named the album among its top albums of 2023, with Justin Moran writing, "the project still manages to sit left of center with an experimental energy that keeps Slayyyter’s brand of pop weird enough for all the outsiders who’ve followed her online since “BFF”.

Courtney DelMar of 50thirdandthird deemed the deluxe edition of Starfucker her definitive 2023 album of the year, and was complementary of Slayyyter's "choice to mostly eschew the straight disco pop that has been in vogue, and make something for the clubs that is a little more indebted to and informed by the underground." In a mostly positive review, Thejas Varma considered the record "pop at its best, a concoction of disparate influences working in sync to produce groovy earworms", but was critical of the track "Memories of You", considering the "bouncy Euro house tune [to be] weakened by a dated trance synth line in its chorus."

== Track listing ==
Starfucker – Standard edition
No.	Title	Writer(s)	Producer(s)	Length
1.	"I Love Hollywood!"	Slayyyter; Jonathan Bach; Nicolas DiPietrantonio	Nicopop	3:04
2.	"Miss Belladonna"	Slayyyter; Bach; DiPietrantonio	Nicopop	3:04
3.	"Dramatic"	Slayyyter; Ellee Duke; Bach; DiPietrantonio	Nicopop	3:11
4.	"My Body"	Slayyyter; Kyle Shearer; Nate Campany	Valley Girl	3:41
5.	"Memories of You"	Slayyyter; Jordan Palmer; Owen Jackson	Palmer	2:52
6.	"Rhinestone Heart"	Slayyyter; Duke; Bach; DiPietrantonio	Nicopop	2:29
7.	"Erotic Electronic"	Slayyyter; Bach; DiPietrantonio; Jackson	Nicopop; Jackson^{[a]}	2:23
8.	"Purrr"	Slayyyter; Aaron Joseph; Vaughn Oliver	Oliver; Joseph	2:11
9.	"Plastic"	Slayyyter; Michael Adubato	Baej Lambeaux	2:41
10.	"Girl Like Me"	Slayyyter; DiPietrantonio	Nicopop	2:46
11.	"Tear Me Open"	Slayyyter; Chris Lyon; Shearer; Campany	Chris Lyon; Valley Girl	3:38
12.	"Out of Time"	Slayyyter; Andy Seltzer; Oliver; Bach; DiPietrantonio; Phil Fearon	Oliver; Nicopop^{[a]}^{[v]}	3:10
Total length:				35:16

Starfucker – Deluxe edition
No.	Title	Writer(s)	Producer(s)	Length
1.	"Starfucker"	Slayyyter; Henry Walter; Mark Landon	Cirkut; M-Phazes	3:25
2.	"Makeup" (featuring Lolo Zouaï)	Slayyyter; Shearer; Campany; Lyon; Lolo Zouaï	Valley Girl; Lyon	3:11
3.	"James Dean"	Slayyyter; Jacob Decoteau; Bach; DiPietrantonio; Jackson	Nicopop; Jackson; Thorne	2:29
Total length:				44:22

Notes

- ^{^[a]} signifies an additional producer
- ^{^[v]} signifies a vocal producer
- Tracks 4 to 15 of the deluxe edition mirror the tracklist of the standard edition.

== Personnel ==
- John Greenham – mastering (tracks 1–7, 9–12)
- Ike Schultz – mixing (tracks 1–7, 9–12)
- Vaughn Oliver – mastering, mixing (track 8)

== Charts ==
2023 chart performance for Starfucker
Chart (2023)	Peak position
US Heatseekers Albums (Billboard)	11
US Top Album Sales (Billboard)	46
US Top Dance Albums (Billboard)	10

2026 chart performance for Starfucker
Chart (2026)	Peak position
Hungarian Physical Albums (MAHASZ)	37
Scottish Albums (Official Charts)	33
UK Albums Sales (Official Charts)	53
US Top Album Sales (Billboard)	33

== Release history ==
Region	Date	Edition(s)	Format	Label
Various	September 22, 2023	Standard	CD; digital download; streaming; LP	Fader
Various	December 1, 2023	Deluxe	Digital download; Streaming	Fader

== Tour ==
To support Starfucker, Slayyyter began the Club Valentine Tour across the United States in October 2023. The same month, dates for the United Kingdom and Ireland were announced for February 2024.

Tour dates

Date	City	Country	Venue	Supporting Act(s)
October 25, 2023	Boston	United States	Royale	Miss Madeline
October 26, 2023	Brooklyn	United States	Brooklyn Steel	Bayli; Miss Madeline
October 27, 2023	Washington, D.C.	United States	9:30 Club	Miss Madeline
October 28, 2023	Philadelphia	United States	Theatre of Living Arts	Miss Madeline
October 31, 2023	Toronto	Canada	The Opera House	Miss Madeline
November 2, 2023	Columbus	United States	Newport Music Hall	Miss Madeline
November 3, 2023	Detroit	United States	Saint Andrew's Hall	Miss Madeline
November 4, 2023	Chicago	United States	House of Blues Chicago	Miss Madeline
November 6, 2023	Denver	United States	Summit	Miss Madeline
November 7, 2023	Salt Lake City	United States	Soundwell	Miss Madeline
November 10, 2023	San Francisco	United States	The Regency Ballroom	Miss Madeline
November 11, 2023	Los Angeles	United States	The Novo	Bayli; Miss Madeline; Lolo Zouaï (Note: Zouaï was credited as a "special guest", appearing during Slayyyter's set to perform their song "Makeup".)
November 12, 2023	San Diego	United States	The Observatory North Park	Miss Madeline
February 11, 2024	Dublin	Ireland	3Olympia Theatre	Miss Madeline
February 13, 2024	Glasgow	United Kingdom	SWG3 Studio Warehouse	Miss Madeline
February 14, 2024	Manchester	United Kingdom	O2 Ritz Manchester	Miss Madeline
February 17, 2024	London	United Kingdom	O2 Forum Kentish Town	Miss Madeline
