= Yes Goddd =

2026 song by Slayyyter

Song by Slayyyter

from the album Worst Girl in America
- Released: March 27, 2026
- Genre: Electro house; industrial rap; bloghouse
- Length: 2:39
- Label: Columbia
- Songwriters: Slayyyter; Jordan Palmer
- Producer: Jordan Palmer

Music video
- "Yes Goddd" on YouTube

"Yes Goddd" (stylized in all caps) is a song by American singer and songwriter Slayyyter. It was released on March 27, 2026 as the seventh song from her third studio album, Worst Girl in America (2026).

== Reception ==
The song received mostly positive reviews. The Daily Nebraskan said, "Slayyyter's distant screams in the chorus literally sent me to the heavens. There was such a beautiful contrast in the verses of the songs, which were more laid-back. The instrumental was very dark wave with atmospheric synths and a robotic bassline".

In their positive review of the song, Nylon described the track as, "Earsplitting, hellish. Makes you feel like you need a bath just listening to it", before remarking, "Slayyyter summer, here we come". Pitchfork expressed that “Songs like ‘Yes Goddd’ and ‘Old Technology’ are fistfights of roiling feedback in the spirit of Justice, SebastiAn, and Soulwax.”

== Charts ==
Chart performance
Chart (2026)	Peak position
US Hot Dance/Pop Songs (Billboard)	13
