= Brittany Murphy (song) =

2026 song by Slayyyter

"Brittany Murphy."

Promotional single by Slayyyter

from the album Worst Girl in America
- Released: May 21, 2026
- Genre: Electropop; dance-pop; indie pop
- Length: 3:44
- Label: Columbia
- Songwriters: Slayyyter; Wyatt Bernard; Austin Corona
- Producers: Corona; Bernard

Visualizer
- "Brittany Murphy." on YouTube

"Brittany Murphy." (stylized in all caps) is a song by American singer and songwriter Slayyyter. It was released on March 27, 2026 as the fourteenth and final song from her third studio album, Worst Girl in America (2026). The song was serviced as a promotional single on May 21, 2026. Its title references American actress and singer Brittany Murphy.

== Background and development ==
The song's title comes from Brittany Murphy, someone who Slayyyter looked up to during her childhood before her death in 2009. Slayyyter, who has been open about lacking a relationship with her own father, personally related to Brittany Murphy saying, "I watched her documentary, and she had a broken relationship with her father, and she would get into relationships with people that weren't really good to her, and I feel like it led to such a tragedy".

Slayyyter said of the song, "I was feeling stuck in my career and having dark thoughts. I kept thinking, if this were the last album I ever made, what would I want it to be? Would I leave behind party songs, or something more personal? The song is about my own suicidal thoughts and feelings. The title is more about honoring her, but the song is about me".

== Reception ==
Pitchfork called the song, "a deceptively sunny dark night of the soul that should be more than enough to correct the impression of Slayyyter being a one-dimensional party girl".
