= Ayesha Erotica =

American singer-songwriter and producer

- Born: Ayesha Alexis Aucellio; August 11, 1996 (age 30)
- Origin: Huntington Beach, California, U.S.
- Genres: Electronic; hyperpop; pop; rap; electroclash
- Occupations: Singer; songwriter; rapper; record producer
- Instruments: Vocals; synthesizers
- Years active: 2015–2018; 2023–present
- Labels: Too Lost; Crack Management
- Formerly of: Freakalicious
- Partner: Brendon Jones (2016-2023)
- Website: ayeshaonline.com

Ayesha Alexis Aucellio (born August 11, 1996), known professionally as Ayesha Erotica, is an American indie singer-songwriter, rapper, record producer and web actress. Known for her elusive social media image and sexually-charged music, her songs typically feature 2000s-inspired imagery and a hyperpop sound.

Erotica began releasing music online in 2015 on SoundCloud. She independently released her debut studio album, Big Juicy, in 2016, with her second record, Barely Legal, and the EP, Cumshot, following shortly after. She later gained mainstream attention for collaborating with other hyperpop artists such as Slayyyter and That Kid before taking a hiatus from music starting in 2018, during which her music rose to further popularity on social media. Following her return to music in 2023, she appeared on singles by Joey Valence & Brae and Odetari, among others, and in 2025, released her third studio album, Precum.

== Early life ==
Ayesha Alexis Aucellio was born on August 11, 1996. She is a transgender woman and began to transition at 16 years old in December 2012, shortly after the release of her third album Fergoo from her old alias "Glitterfruitjuice".

== Career ==
Erotica began uploading under the Ayesha Erotica alias in 2015. She rose to prominence with her single SoundCloud releases while living in Huntington Beach, California, before releasing her debut album as Ayesha Erotica, Big Juicy, in 2016.

She met singer-songwriter Slayyyter through Twitter, and Erotica soon sent her the beat to what would become Slayyyter's 2018 song "BFF". Together, the two released several other songs on SoundCloud, including the That Kid collaboration "Dial Tone", which Steffanee Wang of Nylon praised as a "DIY triumph" and Paper's Brendan Wetmore described as a breakout hit for all three artists. Several of the collaborations between Erotica and Slayyyter were included on Slayyyter's debut self-titled mixtape released the following year, with Erotica credited under the alias Ms. Cheeseburger. In 2018, Erotica removed her music from the internet and stopped releasing under the name Ayesha Erotica after a “fan” on Discord doxxed and deadnamed her. Erotica attributed this incident to fellow artist Quinn Fatal; which eventually led to Fatal leaking demos made by Erotica which had previously been unreleased. This series of events led to Erotica's then-indefinite hiatus from music, announcing her retirement through an Instagram post.

Erotica produced the majority of songs on That Kid's debut mixtape, Crush, which was released in April 2020. During this hiatus, many of her songs became popular on TikTok. A mashup of "Yummy" with the song "Righteous" by Mo Beats also found success on TikTok in 2023 due to the virality of videos by influencer Sabrina Bahsoon taken on the London Underground, who became known as the Tube Girl, in which they were featured. In July 2023, Erotica appeared in a livestream with singer Chase Icon, officially announcing her return to music. Erotica returned to releasing music with a series of singles released in the latter half of 2023 to her new SoundCloud account. She then partnered with Mel 4Ever in a collaborative single titled "Tongues" in January 2024. Erotica was featured on the Kets4eki single "Rock Your Body" in February 2024 and on the Odetari single "Break a Neck" in April 2024. For The New York Times podcast Popcast, Jon Caramanica said that the latter song signaled the potential for a "slow mainstreaming of Ayesha Erotica".

Erotica's unreleased song "Spread That Puss" was sampled in Doechii and JT's song "Alter Ego", which was released in March 2024. She was featured on the "Badder" remix of Joey Valence & Brae's song "The Baddest", which was released in July 2024 and became popular on TikTok. It was later featured on the deluxe version of the duo's album, No Hands, which was released in September 2024. Erotica contributed production to Chase Icon's debut studio album, Icon Baby, which was released in March 2025. Her collaborative single with singer Creep-P, "Bite Me", was released in July 2025.

In February 2025, Erotica released the single "Condom". Her first studio album since her hiatus, Precum, was released August 11, 2025.

== Artistic style ==
Pitchfork's Ashley Bardhan described Erotica as "a prolific hyperpop producer" whose music with Slayyyter was "half-joking and brashly sexual", while Cat Zhang of Pitchfork also identified her music as hyperpop and "airhead pop" and wrote that her "bubblegum tracks" contained "saucy, often scandalous quips" and "invocations of Juicy Couture and UGG boots". Zhang also compared her music to Kesha's in the early 2010s, particularly her debut studio album, Animal. Katherine Gillespie of Paper described Erotica's music as "nostalgic and futuristic at the same time". For PopMatters, Nick Malone called Erotica "an online underground legend" with "playfully hypersexual imagery" and "a formidable back-catalog of pop-rap bangers indebted to the music of the mid-2000s". Steffanee Wang wrote for Nylon that Erotica was "Charli XCX-adjacent".

For Paper, Michael Love Michael wrote that Erotica "seems to come from nowhere but the dark web", while Brittany Menjivar of Passion of the Weiss similarly described her as "elusive" and as having "existed in the internet shadows since her 2015 debut". Menjivar added that Erotica's lyrics often use "crude storytelling to comment on social issues" and "religious imagery with a refreshing lack of self-seriousness".

Kim Petras, Aliyah's Interlude, and Slayyyter have named Erotica as an influence on their music. Slayyyter has compared Erotica's production style to that of the Neptunes, and stated that Erotica helped guide her music in its early stages. In August 2026, Pitchfork ranked Erotica's song "Literal Legend" number 28 on its list of "The 37 Greatest Electroclash Songs of All Time", with the site's Walden Green writing: "Name-checking Lindsay Lohan in one breath and Björk the next, Erotica birthed a new high-low canon. There may be no Kim Petras, no Dorian Electra, and certainly no Slayyyter—who bought some [of] her earliest beats off Erotica—without her."

== Personal life ==
Erotica was in a relationship with Brendon "Brendino" Jones from mid-2016 until May 2023. From July 2023 until mid-2024 she was also in a relationship with American rapper Thomas "Yvncc" Roberts.

== Discography ==
The list of her discography includes music under her name, and also alternative aliases.

=== Studio albums ===
List of studio albums, with release date and label shown
Title	Details
Big Juicy	Released: April 20, 2016; Label: Self-released; Format: Digital download, streaming
Barely Legal	Released: June 11, 2016; Label: Self-released; Format: Digital download, streaming
Precum	Released: August 11, 2025; Label: Crack MGMT; Format: Digital download, streaming
It's My Life, and I'll Die If I Want To	Release date: TBA; Format: Digital download, streaming

=== Mixtapes ===
List of mixtapes, with release date and label shown
Title	Details
Hoes Be Trapping (Note: Released under the alias “Hoodrat Spice”)	Released: June 11, 2012; Label: Self-released; Format: Digital download, streaming
Kawaii Traphouse	Released: August 1, 2012; Label: Self-released; Format: Digital downloading, streaming
Sick at Home	Released: January 3 2016; Label: Self-released; Format: Digital download

=== Extended plays ===
List of extended plays, with release date and label shown
Title	Details
Glitter (Note: Released under the alias “Glitter Fruit Juice”)	Released: August 29, 2012; Label: Self-released; Format: Digital downloading, streaming
Eat It Up (Note: Released under the alias “Karrujah Jone”)	Released: February 6, 2014; Label: Self-released; Format: Digital downloading, streaming
Queen of Pop: Exposed (with Miss Prada)	Released: February 2, 2016; Label: Self-released; Format: Digital download, streaming
Cumshot	Released: August 8, 2016; Label: Self-released; Format: Digital download, streaming
What You Never Got to Hear: A Farewell to the Gangbang Era	Released: February 2, 2017; Label: Self-released; Format: Digital download, streaming
Where Is That Damn Baby? (Note: Released under the alias “Lisa Schultz”)	Released: February 10, 2017; Label: Self-released; Format: Digital download, streaming
Teen Club Masterpieces (Note: Released under the alias “Leslie the Greatest Rapper”)	Released: July 7, 2017; Label: Self-released; Format: Digital download, streaming
It's Lisa Boby! (under the moniker 'Lisa Schultz')	Released: July 25, 2017; Label: Self-released; Format: Digital download, streaming
www.FuckMe.com	Released: November 6, 2017; Label: Self-released; Format: Digital download, streaming
My Last Disaster (Note: Released under the alias “boobie gun”)	Released: June 15, 2025; Label: Self-released; Format: Digital download, streaming
May Was Fuckin Weird	Released: May 23, 2026; Label: Self-released; Format: Digital download, streaming

=== Singles ===
==== As lead artist ====
List of singles as lead artist, with title, year released, chart positions, and album
Title	Year	Peak chart positions	Album
Title	Year	US Dance	Album
"I'm Selling White"	2013 (Note: Released under the alias “COLA LA FLARE”)	—	Non-album singles
"Hitta (G-Mix)"	2013	—	Non-album singles
"Chew On My Kat"	2013	—	Non-album singles
"Squad Car"	2013	—	Non-album singles
"Bums"	2013	—	Non-album singles
"That Turn Me On"	2013	—	Non-album singles
"Late Night Tip"	2013	—	Non-album singles
"Flaw"	2013	—	Non-album singles
"No Friend to Me"	2013	—	Non-album singles
"Turn On Da Lights Ho"	2013	—	Non-album singles
"Bust"	2013	—	Non-album singles
"BMF Freestyle"	2013	—	Non-album singles
"My Moms Song"	2013	—	Non-album singles
"U Claim U Killaz"	2013	—	Non-album singles
"This One"	2013	—	Non-album singles
"Need a Nasty Bitch"	2013	—	Non-album singles
"Cola"	2013	—	Non-album singles
"Pop That Box"	2014 (Note: Released under the aliases “AyeshaGucci” and “Karrujah Jones”)	—	Non-album singles
"Choke Me"	2014	—	Non-album singles
"Expensive" (featuring Chrisfferent)	2014	—	Non-album singles
"Can I Get a Bump?" (Note: First song released under the alias “Ayesha Erotica”)	2015	—	Non-album singles
"That's Hot"	2015	—	Non-album singles
"I'm Tasty Freestyle"	2015	—	Non-album singles
"Sink or Swim"	2015	—	Non-album singles
"Young, Rich & Skinny"	2015	—	Non-album singles
"What It Do"	2015	—	Non-album singles
"Never Marry an Icon"	2016	—	Non-album singles
"Control: The Finale"	2016	—	Non-album singles
"Heidi Montag"	2016	—	Non-album singles
"You Were the Tease"	2016	—	Big Juicy
"Coked Up"	2016	—	Big Juicy
"For the Girls"	2016	—	Non-album single
"Pussy"	2016	—	Barely Legal
"Pretty Wild"	2016	—	Non-album singles
"Used"	2016	—	Non-album singles
"Regret"	2016	—	Non-album singles
"Hit Em (The Recipe)"	2016	—	Non-album singles
"Gangbang"	2016	—	Non-album singles
"Party Bitch"	2016	—	Non-album singles
"Major"	2016	—	Non-album singles
"Fuck Like This" (featuring Brendino)	2016	—	Non-album singles
"Mouth Full of Cock"	2016	—	Non-album singles
"Expensive"	2017	—	Fresh Meat
"La Bella Vita"	2017	—	Fresh Meat
"Fresh Meat"	2017	—	Fresh Meat
"2007"	2017	—	Fresh Meat
"Literal Legend"	2017	—	Fresh Meat
"Yummy"	2017	—	Fresh Meat
"How Long?"	2017	—	Non-album singles
"Hold Me Like a Microphone"	2017	—	Non-album singles
"Princess" (with Petey Plastic)	2018	—	Non-album singles
"Star"	2018	—	Non-album singles
"Vacation Bible School"	2018	—	Non-album singles
"Mary Magdalene"	2023	—	Non-album singles
"I'm Tasty" (with JHawk Productions)	2023	—	Non-album singles
"I Just Stole a Kia"	2023	—	Non-album singles
"Snooki"	2023	—	Non-album singles
"May Showers"	2023	—	Non-album singles
"Hey Y'all"	2023	—	Non-album singles
"Tongues" (with Mel 4Ever)	2024	—	Non-album singles
"Rock Your Body" (with Kets4eki)	2024	—	Non-album singles
"Superpuss"	2024	—	Non-album singles
"Gigabowser" (with Yvncc)	2024	—	Non-album singles
"Break a Neck" (with Odetari)	2024	33	Non-album singles
"Make a Wish" (with Bayymack and strgurrl)	2024	—	Non-album singles
"For the Girls 3"	2024	—	Non-album singles
"Sexy Party"	2024	—	Non-album singles
"Hot Dog Hooker"	2024	—	Non-album singles
"House Party"	2024	—	Non-album singles
"Handjob" (with Baku)	2024	—	Non-album singles
"From the Back"	2024	—	Non-album singles
"Die Slow" (with Lamm)	2024	—	Non-album singles
"FUTR" (with Donatachi and Yvncc)	2024	—	Non-album singles
"Hands on Me"	2024	—	Non-album singles
"Funeral"	2025	—	Non-album singles
"Bitch"	2025	—	Precum
"Condom"	2025	—	Non-album single
"Star 69"	2025	—	Precum
"Menlo Park"	2025	—	Precum
"WTFRU!" (with Jinxerjinxerjinxer)	2026	—	Non-album singles
"Get Money"	2026	—	Non-album singles
"—" denotes a recording that did not chart or was not released in that territory.

==== As featured artist ====
List of singles as featured artist, with title, year released, and album
Title	Year	Album
"Gutta" (Miss Prada featuring Ayesha Erotica)	2015	Non-album single
"Let Me Know" (Miss Prada featuring Ayesha Erotica)	2016	Queen of Pop: Exposed
"Where You @?" (AlexZone featuring Ayesha Erotica)	2016	Non-album singles
"Party with Me" (Truth Crow featuring Ayesha Erotica)	2016	Non-album singles
"Raw" (BISH featuring Ayesha Erotica)	2016	Exposed But Fully Clothed
"BFF" (Slayyyter featuring Ayesha Erotica)	2018	Slayyyter
"Star" (Baby Zionov featuring Ayesha Erotica)	2018	Non-album single
"Take Me" (Boy Sim featuring Ayesha Erotica and Donatachi)	2018	Pink Noise
"Go Insane!" (Street Queer featuring Ayesha Erotica)	2018	Non-album singles
"Poppin'" (Nate Alexander featuring Ayesha Erotica)	2018	Non-album singles
"Dial Tone" (That Kid featuring Slayyyter and Ayesha Erotica)	2018	Non-album singles
"All I Want for Xxxmas" (Slayyyter featuring Ayesha Erotica)	2018	Non-album singles
"Luka Magnota" (Adam Geerz featuring Ayesha Erotica)	2018	Non-album singles
"Regina George" (Kyunchi featuring That Kid and Ayesha Erotica)	2018	Non-album singles
"Shock Treatment (Remix)" (Graveyardguy featuring Ayesha Erotica)	2018	Non-album singles
"Rare Candy" (Monopoly Phonic featuring Ayesha Erotica)	2019	Non-album singles
"Ken Doll" (Gameboi featuring Ayesha Erotica)	2019	Gameboi
"P.M.S" (VZE featuring Popgoth and Ayesha Erotica)	2019	Non-album singles
"Rock Star" (Mattu featuring Ayesha Erotica)	2019	Non-album singles
"Motel 6" (Sunday After featuring Ayesha Erotica)	2019	Non-album singles
"Hoe Park" (PLASTIC featuring Ayesha Erotica)	2019	Online Now
"Chun-Li (Remix)" (Belladonna featuring Ayesha Erotica)	2019	Non-album singles
"Sugar Sweet" (The Blurtoads featuring Ayesha Erotica)	2020	Non-album singles
"Like You" (Will Rebein featuring Ayesha Erotica)	2021	Non-album singles
"Show Me" / "Make It Roll" (Yvncc featuring Ayesha Erotica)	2023	Rite Outside
"Blank Out" (Yvncc featuring Ayesha Erotica)	2023	I'm So Serious
"Dramatic" (Baku & kuudere featuring Ayesha Erotica)	2023	Hypnotized
"Sun Ain't Even Out" / "Chucky So Yucky" (Yvncc featuring Ayesha Erotica)	2024	Quan Shoppe
"Naked" (Public Appeal featuring Ayesha Erotica)	2024	Non-album singles
"Fashion Icon" (Aliyah's Interlude featuring Ayesha Erotica)	2024	Non-album singles
"Babydoll" (S4brina featuring Ayesha Erotica)	2024	Non-album singles
"I Love It" (LyteSpeed featuring S4brina, Proz, and Ayesha Erotica)	2024	Non-album singles
"The Baddest (Badder)" (Joey Valence & Brae featuring Ayesha Erotica)	2024	No Hands (Deluxe)
"Bite Me" (Creep-P featuring Ayesha Erotica)	2025	DO NOT DISTURB
"Kia Day 3" (Nekiakia featuring Ayesha Erotica)	2026	Non-album single

== Filmography ==
Year	Title	Role	Notes
2013	A Message to Christians	Herself	Podcast
2016	The Brendon Show	Herself	Webseries
2017	Crazy Guy	Herself	Webseries; also director
2017	Loose Teens	Herself	Webseries
2018	Ayesha's Corner	Herself	Webseries/Host
