= Worst Man in America =

Studio album (reissue) (Note: The album will be released as a standalone release physically, as well as a reissue of Slayyyter's third studio album Worst Girl in America (2026) both digitally and on select physical releases.) by Slayyyter
- Released: December 4, 2026
- Recorded: 2026
- Length: 32:21
- Label: Columbia
- Producers: Austin Corona; Wyatt Bernard

Slayyyter chronology
Worst Girl in America (2026)	Worst Man in America (2026)

Singles from Worst Man in America
- 1. "Brand New Chanels" Released: July 31, 2026; 2. "Crank 2" Released: September 10, 2026; 3. "I Think He's Got a Girl" Released: October 9, 2026; 4. "Hey Boyyy" Released: November 6, 2026

Worst Man in America (stylized as wor$t man in america) (Note: Digital copies are displayed as Worst Girl in America / Worst Man in America, stylized as WOR$T GIRL IN AMERICA / wor$t man in america.) is the upcoming fourth studio album by American singer-songwriter Slayyyter. It is expected to be released on December 4, 2026, through Columbia Records. The album has been described by Slayyyter as a "brother album" to its predecessor Worst Girl in America (2026), serving as an inversion of its themes. The album is set to be released as a standalone release physically, as well as a deluxe reissue of Worst Girl in America both digitally and on select physical releases.

== Background and themes ==
Following the critical and commercial breakthrough of Worst Girl in America, Slayyyter revealed that she had begun work on a companion record. In an interview with Rolling Stone in June 2026, Slayyyter confirmed that she was developing what she described as a "sister" album to Worst Girl in America, later also referring to the project as its "brother album". She conceived the project as an alternative to releasing a conventional deluxe edition of Worst Girl in America. In a post on X published on July 11, 2026, Slayyyter confirmed that she had further developed the concept of "inversing the album".

Speaking to Vogue in September 2026, Slayyyter announced that the album would be released "soon-ish" and would feature eight new songs. She said she had been "working on finishing" the album at the time of the interview, and explained that she wanted a second part to have ties or "little links" to the original, whether through its lyrics, production, or sound. She described the album as occupying a "deeper, more emotional pocket", with moments that "feel a lot softer" and include "more heartbroken moments". She also identified themes of forgiveness and "having life reckonings with yourself".

== Promotion ==
On July 26, 2026, Slayyyter shared a visual teaser featuring a snippet of the song "Brand New Chanels", an inversion of her 2025 song "Beat Up Chanels", while wearing a hat emblazoned with the title Worst Man in America. The song title had previously been teased in a post on X on May 9. The single was released as the album's lead single on July 31 and debuted at number 98 on the US Billboard Hot 100, marking her first appearance on the chart. The release coincided with the commencement of her Worst Girl in the World Tour on the same day.

On September 7, 2026, she began teasing the release of "Crank 2", a sequel to "Crank", by posting a snippet of the song. The track had previously been previewed on her social media accounts on May 13 and 16, 2026. The song was released on September 10, 2026, and was described upon release as "a little more sinister and infinitely more pissed off" than its counterpart.

On October 5, 2026, its release date was announced as December 4, 2026, coinciding with the release of "I Think He's Got a Girl".

On November 6, 2026, she dropped the fourth single "Hey Boyyy".

== Track listing ==
As of November 6, 2026, only the writing and production credits for "Brand New Chanels", "Crank 2", "I Think He's Got a Girl" and "Hey Boyyy" are available.

No.	Title	Writer(s)	Producer(s)	Length
1.	"Brand New Chanels"	Slayyyter; Austin Dale Corona; Wyatt Bernard	Bernard; Corona	3:58
2.	"Crank 2"	Slayyyter; Bernard; Corona	Bernard; Corona	3:17
3.	"$$$"			2:01
4.	"Nekromantik!"			3:12
5.	"I Think He's Got a Girl"	Slayyyter; Bernard; Corona; Violet Skies	Bernard; Corona	3:34
6.	"Hey Boyyy"	Slayyyter; Bernard; Corona	Bernard; Corona	4:38
7.	"Parking Lot"			4:13
8.	"Perfect Woman"			4:09
9.	"*Hymn*"			3:19
Total length:				32:21

=== Notes ===
- All track titles are stylized in all lowercase.
- "Brand New Chanels" is stylized with the dollar sign instead of the letter S (as "brand new chanel$").
- On digital copies and select physical releases, the Worst Man in America tracks precede the standard tracks of Worst Girl in America.

== Release history ==
Release dates and formats
Date	Format(s)	Label(s)	Edition	Ref.
December 4, 2026	LP	Columbia	Standard	
December 4, 2026	Streaming; download; LP; CD	Columbia	Deluxe	
