= Gas Station (song) =

2026 song by Slayyyter

Promotional single by Slayyyter

from the album Worst Girl in America
- Released: April 14, 2026
- Length: 3:38
- Label: Columbia
- Songwriters: Slayyyter; Wyatt Bernard; Austin Corona
- Producers: Corona; Bernard

Music video
- "Gas Station" on YouTube

"Gas Station" (stylized in all caps) is a song by American singer and songwriter Slayyyter. It was released on March 27, 2026 as the sixth song from her third studio album, Worst Girl in America (2026). The song was released as a promotional single on April 14, 2026.

== Background and development ==
In an interview, Slayyyter was asked about the song and said, "I started writing Gas Station about an ex-relationship with the hook and as I got more into writing it, I started talking about a situation that happened with my dad. When I was really young, we got in a fight and he made me get out of the car at a gas station and just drove away. I found it interesting that when you’re in a bad relationship and you look at relationships with your parents, there can be a lot of parallels".

== Critical reception ==
The song received mostly positive reviews from critics. In a more mixed review from Riff Magazine, they said of the track, "Slayyyter slightly lowers the intensity. Distorted synths and danceability are still present, but the energy is more restrained and hazy. The song, slightly less inventive and thrilling than the five that came before it, will still be great in a club".

== Charts ==
=== Weekly charts ===
Weekly chart performance
Chart (2026)	Peak position
Estonia Airplay (TopHit)	76

=== Monthly charts ===
Monthly chart performance
Chart (2026)	Peak position
Estonia Airplay (TopHit)	88
