= Cannibalism! =

2025 single by Slayyyter

Single by Slayyyter

from the album Worst Girl in America
- Released: September 12, 2025
- Length: 2:47
- Label: Columbia
- Songwriters: Slayyyter; Austin Corona; Wyatt Bernard
- Producers: Corona; Bernard

Slayyyter singles chronology
"Beat Up Chanels" (2025)	"Cannibalism!" (2025)	"Crank" (2025)

Music video
- "Cannibalism!" on YouTube

"Cannibalism!" (stylized in all caps) is a song by American singer and songwriter Slayyyter. It was released on September 12, 2025 as the second single from her third studio album, Worst Girl in America (2026).

== Background ==
In an interview with Vogue, Slayyyter said the song was written in under an hour with her vocal delivery directly inspired by Jack White and The Cramps.

== Reception ==
Out Now said, "Slayyyter delivers a feverish club anthem that blurs the line between lust and destruction. Over pounding rhythms and warped guitar distortion, the lyrics descend into the intoxicating grip of obsession and desire", and additionally described the song as, "impassioned with the high stakes, life or death nature of obsessive yearning".

== Music video ==
The video, which was directed by Slayyyter, consists of multiple different scenes showing her sprawled across the floor in the dressing room of a club, singing in a junkyard wearing a playsuit with dollar bills sprouting from her pocket, and her on stage wearing a piece of clothing she made herself. The video was inspired by Bob Fosse and his filmography.
