= Crank (Slayyyter song) =

2025 single by Slayyyter

Single by Slayyyter

from the album Worst Girl in America
- Released: October 24, 2025
- Genre: Jersey club; industrial hip-hop
- Length: 2:55
- Label: Columbia
- Songwriters: Slayyyter; Austin Corona; Wyatt Bernard
- Producers: Austin Corona; Wyatt Bernard

Slayyyter singles chronology
"Cannibalism!" (2025)	"Crank" (2025)	"Dance..." (2026)

Music video
- "Crank" on YouTube

"Crank" (stylized in all caps) is a song by the American singer and songwriter Slayyyter. It was released on October 24, 2025, as the third single from her third studio album, Worst Girl in America (2026), through Columbia Records. Written by Slayyyter alongside producers Austin Corona and Wyatt Bernard, the track features distortion and influence from Jersey club and industrial hip-hop, with the lyrics detailing Slayyyter's hedonistic activities while under the influence of drugs and alcohol. A sequel named "Crank 2" was released on September 10, 2026, for the upcoming album Worst Man in America.

== Background and recording ==
"Crank" was written by Slayyyter alongside producers Austin Corona and Wyatt Bernard, who also served as recording engineers and programmers. The song was created by the three in New York, where Slayyyter wrote its lyrics in thirty minutes while taking adderall to treat her attention deficit hyperactivity disorder (ADHD). She attributed her decision to rap the vocals to her 2019 single "Daddy AF" in an interview with the Los Angeles Times, as it was the first time she ever rapped and made her want to keep doing it.

== Composition and lyrics ==
"Crank"
The beat to "Crank" was often noted for having production inspired by industrial music, particularly industrial hip-hop.

Musically, "Crank" features a distorted, abrasive beat with influence from Jersey club and industrial hip-hop, and is partially based on American singer Beyoncé's 2006 single "Ring the Alarm". Slayyyter's vocals are similarly distorted and delivered with screaming, with her performance being varyingly described as rapped or sung. It uses samples of the fictional character Carrie Bradshaw, as portrayed by American actress Sarah Jessica Parker in the TV series Sex and the City.

The lyrics to "Crank" detail Slayyyter's hedonism while under the influence of drugs and the alcoholic beverage Tequila. In the refrain, she screams that she keeps her "finger on the trigger" and had sex with another woman after getting "so gay" off the drink, which she later claimed is something she "famously" does in an interview with The Fader. Elsewhere, she demands the listener to "crank it!" and references her stage name originating from Ron Slater, a character from Richard Linklater's 1993 film Dazed and Confused, making a double entendre with the director's name.

== Release and reception ==
Critics often praised Slayyyter's lyrics on "Crank".

"Crank" was released as a single on October 24, 2025, through Columbia Records, serving as the third single from Slayyter's third studio album, Worst Girl in America (2026). In an accompanying press release, the singer reflected that it felt "very freeing" to scream "nonsense" into her microphone instead of using the "soaring vocal melodies or really pin pointed lyrical concept" she feels are expected from pop and dance music. The song was the subject of a TikTok trend in the spring of 2026, where people would mouth the line "crank it!" after receiving their diploma at graduation. Worst Girl in America was released on March 27, 2026, with "Crank" as its fifth track. Following the album's release, the song charted on the Hot Dance/Pop Songs chart from Billboard, peaking at number 12.

"Crank" has since been acclaimed by music critics. The Guardian's Adrian Horton wrote that "nothing has gotten me through this brutal New York winter quite like Crank," lauding it as "deliriously overstimulating" before positively comparing its chorus to a plane crash. Nick Malone of PopMatters described it as the album's "crown jewel", praising how the track "marries [Slayyyter's] winking humor with her bass addiction", a sentiment shared by NME's Bailey Slater in relation to it featuring the singer's "historically cheeky pen". Nylon named "Crank" as one of the best songs of its release week, with writer Jillian Giandurco opining that she "genuinely can't wait to see the long term effects this track will have on [her] tinnitus."

== Live performances ==
Slayyyter performed "Crank" during her set at Coachella 2026, with the performance later going viral online after the audience screamed the refrain "so loud it felt like the room was shaking". A performance during the 2026 Governors Ball Music Festival prompted a similar reaction; according to Atwood Magazine, "[a]s soon as the first notes started, people started screeching. There were mini-mosh pits with fans absolutely losing their minds for the chorus".

== Credits and personnel ==
Credits are adapted from Tidal.

- Slayyyter – performer, songwriter
- Austin Corona – songwriter, production, recording engineer, programming
- Wyatt Bernard – songwriter, production, recording engineer, programming
- Clint Gibbs – mixing engineer
- Randy Merrill – mastering engineer

== Charts ==
Chart performance
Chart (2026)	Peak position
US Hot Dance/Pop Songs (Billboard)	12
