= Beat Up Chanels =

2025 single by Slayyyter

Single by Slayyyter

from the album Worst Girl in America
- Released: August 1, 2025
- Genre: Electroclash
- Length: 3:18
- Label: Columbia
- Songwriters: Slayyyter; Austin Corona; Wyatt Bernard
- Producers: Corona; Bernard

Slayyyter singles chronology
"Attention!" (2025)	"Beat Up Chanels" (2025)	"Cannibalism!" (2025)

Music video
- "Beat Up Chanels" on YouTube

"Beat Up Chanels" (stylized as "BEAT UP CHANEL$") is the major label debut single by American singer and songwriter Slayyyter. It was released on August 1, 2025, as the lead single from her third studio album, Worst Girl in America (2026), and it is her first release under Columbia Records. The song "Brand New Chanels", released on July 31, 2026, as a single for the upcoming album Worst Man in America, acts as a direct inversion to it.

== Background and development ==
Slayyyter called the song, "an evolution of my sound and where my head is at creatively for the future. Drunk high school nights in parking lots, hanging at the skate park watching the boys, longing for designer items I couldn’t afford, partying in motels in St. Louis when the bars would close, dying my hair purple".

== Reception ==
The song received positive reviews from critics. Out Now Magazine said, "With high-octane production, glitch-infused club beats, and layers of pulsating synths, BEAT UP CHANEL$ blurs the lines between chaotic nightlife and emotional vulnerability. The single explores themes of detachment, love, and luxury, capturing the kind of high-energy escapism Slayyyter has become known for". FEMMUSIC Magazine described the song as, "a club anthem packed with chaos, couture and cutthroat attitude fueled by glitchy club beats and pulsating synths".

== Music video ==
The video, which was directed by Slayyyter and Hannah DeVries, contains chaotic imagery of Slayyyter wielding a bat, strutting through the desert with a posse, working out alongside bald people, shooting a Chanel bag, smoking in front of fireworks, watching a mud fight, and dancing at a rave. The music video features professional skateboarder Chandler Burton who also appears on the album cover for Worst Girl in America.
