= Broke Bitch Freestyle =

2026 single by Slayyyter

Single by Slayyyter
- Released: April 17, 2026
- Length: 2:13
- Label: Columbia
- Songwriters: Slayyyter; marvy ayy; Owen Jackson
- Producers: marvy ayy; Owen Jackson

Slayyyter singles chronology
"Old Technology" (2026)	"Broke Bitch Freestyle" (2026)	"Fire Away" (2026)

Visualizer
- "Broke Bitch Freestyle" on YouTube

"Broke Bitch Freestyle" (stylized as BROKE BITCH FREE$TYLE) is a song by American singer-songwriter Slayyyter. It was released on April 17, 2026 as a surprise standalone single release following her third studio album, Worst Girl in America.

== Background ==
The song had been played live for years as an unreleased track, starting with a performance at the Boiler Room in 2024.

== Critical reception ==
The Musical Hype gave a positive review of the song stating, "Slayyyter is true to her blunt, wild, and unapologetic self on the brief but entertaining single. The song is brief, but once more, our electronic pop singer and rapper brings the heat".

== Live performance ==
Slayyyter performed the finalized version of the song as the opening track for her second Coachella 2026 show at the Mojave Tent, which occurred on the same day the song was released.

== Charts ==
Chart performance
Chart (2026)	Peak position
New Zealand Hot Singles (RMNZ)	30
