= Dance... =

2026 single by Slayyyter

Single by Slayyyter

from the album Worst Girl in America
- B-side: "Dance..." (edit); Voice note from Slayyyter
- Released: January 16, 2026
- Genre: Electropop
- Length: 4:47; 3:56 (edit)
- Label: Columbia
- Songwriters: Slayyyter; Nate Campany; Kyle Shearer
- Producer: Valley Girl

Slayyyter singles chronology
"Crank" (2025)	"Dance..." (2026)	"Old Technology" (2026)

Music video
- "Dance..." on YouTube

"Dance..." (stylized in all caps) is a song by American singer-songwriter Slayyyter. It was released on January 16, 2026 as the fourth single from her third studio album, Worst Girl in America (2026). The song was released alongside the announcement of the album.

The song became a sleeper hit online and went viral on TikTok, becoming a trend where people record themselves looking ill before snapping to attention and posing or dancing. As the song was going viral, it began charting in multiple countries. "Dance..." marked the first time one of Slayyyter's songs charted in more than one country, the first time one of her songs charted on a Billboard chart, and the first single of hers to chart anywhere as well.

== Critical reception ==
Margaret Farrell of Stereogum called the song "a dark and seductive pop song that comes into focus with buzzy synths and a vampiric melody". Billboard's Katie Bain described it as a "dancefloor siren call" with a "pulsing, breathy and the right kind of ominous" production that incorporates elements of French touch. Bain also highlighted the song's lyrical theme, noting that Slayyyter's declaration of "I kind of hate you but, it doesn't matter, let me dance" serves as "a nod to the eternal shake-it-off power of the club".

== Live performance ==
Slayyyter performed "Dance..." for The Tonight Show Starring Jimmy Fallon on May 19, 2026, marking her first career performance on television. She sang the song whilst wearing a beaded silver leotard with soda-can-top nipples, something that Jimmy Fallon positively commented on after her performance.

== Charts ==
=== Weekly charts ===
Weekly chart performance
Chart (2026)	Peak position
Belarus Airplay (TopHit)	58
Belgium (Ultratop 50 Wallonia)	50
Canada (Canadian Hot 100)	88
CIS Airplay (TopHit)	86
Estonia Airplay (TopHit)	42
Finland Airplay (Radiosoittolista)	47
Greece International (IFPI)	60
Honduras Anglo Airplay (Monitor Latino)	12
Ireland (IRMA)	68
Lithuania (AGATA)	23
Lithuania Airplay (TopHit)	20
Russia Airplay (TopHit)	94
Switzerland (Schweizer Hitparade)	49
UK Singles (Official Charts)	86
US Bubbling Under Hot 100 (Billboard)	8
US Hot Dance/Pop Songs (Billboard)	7
US Pop Airplay (Billboard)	37

=== Monthly charts ===
Monthly chart performance
Chart (2026)	Peak position
Belarus Airplay (TopHit)	87
CIS Airplay (TopHit)	97
Estonia Airplay (TopHit)	54
Lithuania Airplay (TopHit)	29

== Release history ==
Release dates and formats
Region	Date	Format	Version	Label(s)	Ref.
Various	January 16, 2026	Digital download; streaming	Original; edit	Columbia	
Various	June 15, 2026	7-inch vinyl	Original; edit	Columbia	
