= Troubled Paradise =

Studio album by Slayyyter
- Released: June 11, 2021
- Recorded: 2019–2020
- Genres: Hyperpop; electropop
- Length: 36:31
- Label: Fader
- Producers: Wuki; Gupi; John Hill; Jordan Palmer; Robokid; Chris Greatti; Dave Burris; Kyle Shearer; Micah Jasper; Nate Campany; Nicopop; Pilotpriest; Schmarx; Zakk Cervini

Slayyyter chronology
Slayyyter (2019)	Troubled Paradise (2021)	Starfucker (2023)

Singles from Troubled Paradise
- 1. "Self Destruct" Released: October 21, 2020; 2. "Troubled Paradise" Released: January 22, 2021; 3. "Clouds" Released: February 26, 2021; 4. "Cowboys" Released: April 9, 2021; 5. "Over This!" Released: May 7, 2021

Troubled Paradise is the debut studio album by American singer and songwriter Slayyyter. It was released on June 11, 2021, by Fader. It received generally positive reviews from music critics, who praised the updated production, lyricism and maturity in songwriting. Some critics deemed this album an improvement from her debut mixtape.

== Background and development ==
In September 2019, after releasing a string of singles and having achieved a moderate success with tracks on TikTok, as well as ascending in social media as an emerging star in niches such as hyperpop and the Stan Twitter community, Slayyyter released her eponymous debut mixtape. A month before its release, the artist answered some online questions regarding the mixtape. In response to a fan asking if rock would be present on the mixtape, she replied that she would be "saving this style for S2", presumably referring to her then-upcoming debut studio album. Later, Slayyyter did indeed work with the genre in some of the Troubled Paradise tracks. Slayyyter stated that she named the album after the title track, "Troubled Paradise," as a condensed version of the phrase "trouble in paradise." The album’s visuals and sound were partly inspired by Gwen Stefani's Love. Angel. Music. Baby. (2004). The multi-genre nature of the album was intentional, a bid to show fans her diverse potential as an artist and to break away from her past Y2K and bimbo aesthetics.

In September 2019, a few days before the release of Slayyyter, the singer was questioned on Twitter about a popular unreleased track among fans she had mentioned and played before, "Doghouse" (later, "Dog House"). The answer was "yes :} will be finished for s1 deluxe edition". Months after that, she continued to tease fans with a taste of what was coming, having teased "Doghouse" almost in full while livestreaming on Instagram. Some other rumors also started spreading about what songs would be included in Slayyyter's next record. Known tracks at the time (late 2019 and early 2020) were "Talk to Me", "ID", "Dangerous", "Villain" and "Heaven". None of those tracks, with the exception of "Villain" and "Dog House", were added to the final tracklist of Troubled Paradise. It is also worth noting that since the release of her first demos on SoundCloud, around 2018, the release of her debut mixtape and Mini Tour in 2019, until the release of Troubled Paradise in 2021, Slayyyter gained enough popularity to obtain a loyal fanbase. "Serial Killer" was one of the first songs Slayyyter ever wrote, which she brought back for this album.

The production of Troubled Paradise has its roots back in Slayyyter's Mini Tour (2019), when she teased fans saying the album would be "much better" than her debut mixtape and that they would love it. In early 2020, the singer traveled to L.A. to work on the record. She ended up staying there, while many recording studios shuttered and halted music production. "A lot of people were, like 'I can't make songs right now 'cause I can't get to the studio [...] And I was like, '[That] sucks. I'm fine. I know how to do it.'", she says. Regarding the production of Troubled Paradise, she stated in interviews that its sound would be cleaner than her previous record, as she realized many fans were criticizing the mixing of Slayyyter. "It isn't bedroom pop", says the artist.

== Composition ==
Slayyyter said that the album was divided into a rap-centered first half and a pop-centered second half. Slayyyter described her sound during this era as experimental pop. She also said that the album’s lyrics were supposed to be "vulgar" and "ridiculous" in order to play with taboos and humor, comparing her humor to Cardi B's. Slayyyter later described the album's visuals as a "disaster".

=== Songs ===
Slayyyter described "Venom" as an "club track," and the most "insane" song on the album. "Throatzillaaa" was inspired by a comment Slayyyter's friend made about a porn star. Slayyyter cited “Clouds” as the best song she had ever made, in June 2021. "Clouds" was inspired by the imposter syndrome she felt as an unsuccessful artist during the COVID-19 quarantine. "Cowboys" and "Serial Killer" are narratively driven, and saw Slayyyter pushing herself to write stronger lyrics. She said that "Letters" is her first love ballad, a stark contrast from the explicit nature of her other work.

== Singles and promotion ==
On October 21, 2020, "Self Destruct" was released as the album's lead single, accompanied by the release of its music video hours later. The music video was directed by Brent McKeever.

"Throatzillaaa" was released as the first promotional single on November 13, 2020. A lyric video was made available on November 9 before the official announcement on November 11. In December, the title track "Troubled Paradise" was registered on Slayyyter's ASCAP. before being officially announced on January 19, 2021. "Troubled Paradise" and its music video, directed by Munachi Osegbu and produced by Collin Druz, were released on January 22. The song was leaked in full the day before, as well as the album's final tracklist, cover art and the "Troubled Paradise" music video.

On January 21, 2021, one day before planned, Slayyyter announced the official album title as Troubled Paradise on social media, along with its official art cover and release date of June 11, 2021. The day after, the tracklist and pre-sale were made available.

"Clouds" was released as the next single on February 26, 2021, followed by "Cowboys" on April 9 and "Over This!" on May 7.

== Critical reception ==
Professional ratings
Review scores
Source	Rating
Beyond the Stage	8/10
Dork	5/5 stars
Pitchfork	6.0/10
PopMatters	8/10
Tom Hull – on the Web	B+

Critics including Nick Malone of PopMatters and Stereogum's Chris DeVille noted Slayyyter's departure from her previous Britney Spears-influenced sound on Troubled Paradise. The record's sound recalled the "pure pop" era of the early 2010s, and was compared to veteran pop acts like Kesha, No Doubt, Robyn, Robin S., Lady Gaga, and Paramore as well as Slayyyter's contemporaries like Ashnikko, Rina Sawayama, Charli XCX, and Kim Petras.

DeVille criticized Troubled Paradise for adopting the hyperpop sound without pushing the genre's sonic boundaries meaningfully. The album drew on the sex-positive club, techno, and electropop sounds of the era, while remaining surface-level in its exploration of them, according to him.

Abigail Firth of Dork called the album "fun and tacky," and noted Slayyyter's embrace of pop-punk on "Over This!" and "Cowboys". According to Firth, Slayyyter solidified her presence in the music industry with this album.

Beyond the Stage lauded the three-song run from "Troubled Paradise" to "Cowboys" as the arc of the album, reinforcing Slayyyter's "rambunctious" image. They also pointed to Slayyyter's references to The Wizard of Oz throughout the album, both lyrically and aesthetically, as a means to explore her identity as an artist.

== Track listing ==
Troubled Paradise track listing
No.	Title	Writer(s)	Producer(s)	Length
1.	"Self Destruct" (featuring Wuki)	Slayyyter; Kris Barman	Wuki	2:15
2.	"Venom"	Slayyyter; Ethan Budnick	Robokid	2:24
3.	"Throatzillaaa"	Slayyyter; Spencer Hawk	Gupi	3:05
4.	"Dog House"	Slayyyter; Budnick	Robokid	2:22
5.	"Butterflies..."	Slayyyter; Budnick	Robokid	1:48
6.	"Troubled Paradise"	Slayyyter; John Hill; Jordan Palmer; Budnick	Robokid; Hill; Palmer	4:01
7.	"Clouds"	Slayyyter; Marc Schneider; Nicolas DiPietrantonio	Schmarx; Nicopop	3:10
8.	"Cowboys"	Slayyyter; Dave Burris; Micah Jasper	Burris; Jasper	3:38
9.	"Serial Killer"	Slayyyter; Anthony Scott Burns	Pilotpriest	3:57
10.	"Over This!"	Slayyyter; Catherine Leavy; Chris Greatti; Zakk Cervini	Greatti; Cervini	2:56
11.	"Villain"	Slayyyter; Leavy; Greatti; Cervini	Greatti; Cervini	3:33
12.	"Letters"	Slayyyter; Nate Campany; Kyle Shearer	Campany; Shearer	3:15
Total length:				36:31

== Personnel ==
- John Greenham – mastering
- Wuki – mixing, recording (1)
- Rob Kinelski – mixing (2, 5–12)
- Ike Schultz – mixing (3, 4)
- Robokid – recording (2, 4–6)
- Gupi – recording (3)
- John Hill – recording (6)
- Jordan Palmer – recording (6)
- Schmarx – recording (7)
- Nicopop – recording (7)
- Dave Burris – recording (8)
- Micah Jasper – recording (8)
- Lauren D'Elia – recording (9)
- Pilotpriest – recording (9)
- Chris Greatti – recording (10, 11)
- Zakk Cervini – recording (10, 11)
- Kyle Shearer – recording (12)
- Nate Campany – recording (12)
