= Slayyyter (mixtape) =

- Standard cover

Mixtape by Slayyyter
- Released: September 17, 2019
- Recorded: 2018–2019
- Genres: Pop; dance-pop; hyperpop
- Length: 41:16
- Label: Self-released
- Producers: Ayesha Erotica; Good Intent; Robokid; Ms. Cheeseburger; AObeats; Donatachi; Boy Sim

Slayyyter chronology
Slayyyter (2019)	Troubled Paradise (2021)

Singles from Slayyyter
- 1. "BFF" Released: August 9, 2018; 2. "Candy" Released: October 1, 2018; 3. "Alone" Released: December 12, 2018; 4. "Mine" Released: February 14, 2019; 5. "Daddy AF" Released: May 15, 2019; 6. "Cha Ching" Released: August 16, 2019

Slayyyter is the debut mixtape by American singer and songwriter Slayyyter. It was independently released on September 17, 2019. The album was inspired by pop artists from the early and mid 2000s. The mixtape received positive reviews from music critics, who praised the production, lyrical content and Slayyyter's vocal performance. The album features collaborations from pop artists including Ayesha Erotica.

== Promotion ==
On August 9, 2018, "BFF", featuring Ayesha Erotica, was released as the first single. It was followed by "Candy", released on October 1, "Alone" on December 12, "Mine" on February 14, 2019, "Daddy AF" on May 15 and "Cha Ching" on August 16, a month before the release of the project. During the 2019 summer, Slayyyter embarked on The Mini Tour in order to promote the mixtape through North America.

== Composition ==
=== Songs ===
Slayyyter stated in November 2023 that the mixtape’s single "Daddy AF” was an autobiographical song about a one-night stand she had with a model.

== Critical reception ==
Professional ratings
Review scores
Source	Rating
PopMatters	7/10
WRSU	8.5/10

Some critics called Slayyyter too derivative of Blackout-era Britney Spears and other aspects of the 2000s era. Others, including Nick Malone of PopMatters, pointed out the mixtape's marked departure from the hip-hop and R&B-influenced pop from Billie Eilish, Ariana Grande and Doja Cat.

== Track listing ==
Slayyyter standard edition
No.	Title	Writer(s)	Producer(s)	Length
1.	"BFF" (featuring Ayesha Erotica)	Slayyyter; Ayesha Erotica	Erotica	3:35
2.	"Mine"	Slayyyter; Ethan Budnick; Camm Davidson	Good Intent; Robokid	2:39
3.	"Alone"	Slayyyter; Erotica	Erotica	2:42
4.	"Candy"	Slayyyter	Erotica	2:36
5.	"Cha Ching"	Slayyyter; Budnick; Joel Gardner; Madeline Crabtree	Robokid	2:39
6.	"Devil"	Slayyyter; Erotica; Budnick	Robokid; Erotica	2:57
7.	"Ur Man"	Slayyyter; Andrew Okamura; Budnick	Robokid; AObeats	2:24
8.	"Daddy AF"	Slayyyter; Okamura; Budnick	Robokid; AObeats	2:31
9.	"Motorcycle"	Slayyyter; Okamura; Budnick	Robokid; AObeats	2:46
10.	"Celebrity"	Slayyyter; Douglas Simmons	Donatachi	3:21
11.	"Tattoo"	Slayyyter; Erotica	Erotica	3:30
12.	"E-Boy" (featuring That Kid)	Slayyyter; Spencer Joseph; Christopher Sauceda	Boy Sim	2:39
13.	"Touch My Body"	Slayyyter; Sauceda	Boy Sim	3:28
14.	"Ghosttt"	Slayyyter; Budnick	Robokid	3:29
Total length:				41:16

Slayyyter 5 year anniversary deluxe vinyl edition
No.	Title	Writer(s)	Producer(s)	Length
8.	"Hello Kitty"	Slayyyter; Ayesha Erotica	Boy Sim	3:00
Total length:				44:16
