= Slayyyter =

American singer and songwriter (born 1996)

- Slayyyter in 2026

Background information
- Born: Catherine Grace Garner; September 17, 1996 (age 30); Kirkwood, Missouri, U.S.
- Genres: Pop; electropop; synth-pop; dance-pop; hyperpop; electropunk
- Occupations: Singer; songwriter
- Works: Discography
- Years active: 2018–present
- Labels: Big Beat; Fader; Stem; Records; Columbia
- Website: slayyyter.com

Catherine Grace Garner (born September 17, 1996), known professionally as Slayyyter, is an American singer and songwriter. Known for her brash and sex-positive lyricism and electropop production, she started with independently releasing songs through SoundCloud. Her debut mixtape, Slayyyter, was independently released in 2019. Her debut album, Troubled Paradise, was released in June 2021, followed by her second album, Starfucker, in September 2023.

After signing to Columbia and Records in 2025, she released her third album, Worst Girl in America, which came out in March 2026 and reached #1 on the Billboard Top Dance Albums chart. The album yielded the sleeper-hit "Dance..." which reached #7 on Billboard's Hot Dance/Pop Songs chart. She has earned a total of four Grammy nominations, including for Best New Artist.

== Early life and career ==
=== Early life ===
Slayyyter is from Kirkwood, Missouri, a suburb west of St. Louis, where she has "kind of lived [her] whole life". She has gone by her middle name "Grace" since childhood. Her mother is a devout Polish American Catholic; however, she was not a strict parent. Her childhood was affected by her father's alcoholism and drug addiction. She described her parents as having a "toxic" relationship while she was growing up, and Slayyyter has been estranged from her father since childhood. Her mother introduced her to the Beatles, the Beach Boys, Dennis Wilson, Michael Jackson, and Elton John; the latter inspired her future costumes. Slayyyter's maternal grandfather gifted her with her first turntable, on which she started listening to records from her mother's collection.

Slayyyter aspired to be a movie star, a singer, or a comedian on Saturday Night Live as a child. She took ballet and hip-hop dance lessons until high school, when her family could no longer afford them. She went to a small Catholic school in St. Louis until eighth grade. In middle school, Slayyyter and her friends performed "Push it to the Limit" by Corbin Bleu for a talent show, marking her first public performance. As a child, she would watch the I Am... World Tour and Lady Gaga Presents the Monster Ball Tour: At Madison Square Garden tour DVDs "religiously," memorizing Lady Gaga and Beyoncé's choreography.

Slayyyter later attended Kirkwood High School, where she was "offered great music classes for the first time." There, she was in an a capella choir, took voice lessons, performed concert solos, and was a member of the Kirkwood swim team. Slayyyter said that her involvement in the arts helped her avoid using hard drugs like heroin, which many of her classmates took and frequently overdosed on, sometimes resulting in fatalities. Slayyyter's favorite classes were English, film studies, and art, but she struggled with other subjects. Having grown up without money, she often felt insecure around wealthy classmates. Slayyyter first became involved in stoner culture in high school, and smoked cannabis regularly with her friends. She listened to pop artists, went to concerts regularly, including Marina and the Diamonds, Lana Del Rey, and Charli XCX, and found community through Tumblr.

Slayyyter studied at the University of Missouri in Columbia for about a year. She feels it was an "expensive experiment" in which she began a career as a musician, making "'80s lo-fi pop" which she produced and edited herself out of her bedroom closet, but never published. She dropped out of college in 2016 and continued to create music while working as a hair salon receptionist in Des Peres, camming, and doing findomme work to make money. She said it was her e-girl "hustler" phase.

=== 2018–2019: Singles, The Mini Tour, and Slayyyter ===
Garner began going by the moniker "Slayyyter" as a spin on the last name of character Ron Slater, from Richard Linklater's Dazed and Confused (1993). She chose the name so that she could have the same username on all social media platforms. She later said that most of her early fans were Charli XCX stan accounts. Retroactively, she likened the iteration of her persona to a Britney Spears impersonation. Slayyyter contacted her most frequent early collaborator, Ayesha Erotica, on Twitter, where they both developed a following. Slayyyter credits Stan Twitter users for introducing her to Erotica, discovering Erotica's music after a fan said they looked similar. Erotica sent Slayyyter a music demo which became Slayyyter's debut single "BFF". The song was then released on SoundCloud in 2018, featuring Erotica as a collaborator. Slayyyter also met collaborator That Kid through Twitter during the same period. Slayyyter has since criticized the body shaming and scrutiny she experienced from fans on X.

In early 2019, a 15-second snippet of Slayyyter's song "Mine" went viral on Twitter, and was later released on Valentine's Day. The Stan Twitter success of "Mine" and the later single "Daddy AF" allowed her to leave her job as a hair salon receptionist and pursue music full time. Slayyyter said that as she began recording music, men in the industry treated her "weirdly" and "inappropriately" because of her songs' sexual content and her history as a sex worker. The men she referenced have been fired by their labels.

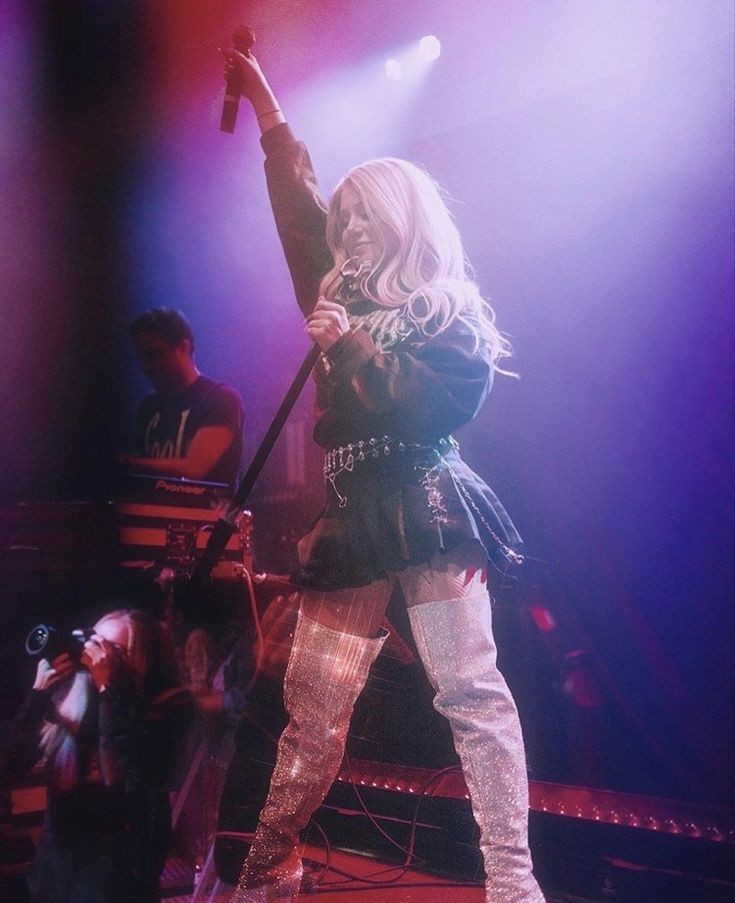
Slayyyter performing at Rebel in Toronto, October 2019

In June 2019, Slayyyter embarked on her sold-out debut tour, entitled "The Mini Tour" in support of her first few singles. The tour began on June 24 in Brooklyn, New York and concluded on July 27 in St. Louis. On September 17, 2019, Slayyyter released her debut mixtape, Slayyyter, which combined dance-pop and hyperpop production. "Daddy AF", from the mixtape, was later featured in two films: Bodies Bodies Bodies (2022) and Anora (2024).

In October 2019, Slayyyter opened for Charli XCX's Charli Live Tour, after being featured on a "No Boys" remix of "Click" with Charli XCX and Kim Petras. In December 2019, fans revealed Slayyyter had made a series of tweets containing racial slurs through a Fifth Harmony stan account in 2012 and 2013. She apologized and said, "I have grown and changed so much in the past eight years and the person I am today is not who I was at age 15. Eight years is a lot of time to reflect, grow, mature and better yourself as a human being... I know that being young or uneducated about the matter also does not excuse any of these things, but please know that people do change." Slayyyter committed funds resulting from her CD and vinyl sales to the Sylvia Rivera Law Project and Black Trans Travel Fund—two charities benefitting black trans youth.

=== 2020–2021: Troubled Paradise ===
During the outbreak of the COVID-19 pandemic in 2020, Slayyyter was meeting with producers in Los Angeles. Unable to leave due to travel bans, she purchased an apartment in Beverly Hills, California and continued to make music during the quarantine period. These recordings later contributed to her debut album, Troubled Paradise.

Slayyyter released a remix of Britney Spears' "Gimme More" to SoundCloud in April 2020. On January 26, 2021, Heidi Montag confirmed via Twitter that she would be featured on a remix of the track. However, in a 2023 interview with Vice, Slayyyter confirmed the collaboration would not be released due to a "sample clearance issue", revealing that the sample was "crazy expensive to clear". In May 2024, Slayyyter said that she had tried to clear the sample for release but the song's original writers would not comply with her team. In 2026, she said that it "wouldn't make sense to put (the song) out now" and that the original sample would still be difficult to clear.

In October and November 2020, she released the songs "Self Destruct" and "Throatzillaaa", respectively. On January 21, 2021, she announced her debut studio album, Troubled Paradise, which was set to be released on June 11. The third single from the album, (Note: Previously released singles "Self Destruct" and "Throatzillaaa" appear on the album.) "Troubled Paradise" released along with its music video the next day. From February to May 2021, she released the singles "Clouds", "Cowboys", and "Over This!" ahead of the album.

Troubled Paradise was released on June 11, 2021, through Fader Label. Pitchfork's Ashley Bardhan called the project "vibrant and ridiculous". Slayyyter promoted the album by releasing Vevo Live performances for the tracks 'Letters' and 'Troubled Paradise'. On November 5, 2021, she released the standalone single "Stupid Boy", a dance-pop song featuring Big Freedia. Later in 2021, she released Inferno Euphoria, an EP of remixes from Troubled Paradise.

=== 2022–2025: Starfucker and tour ===
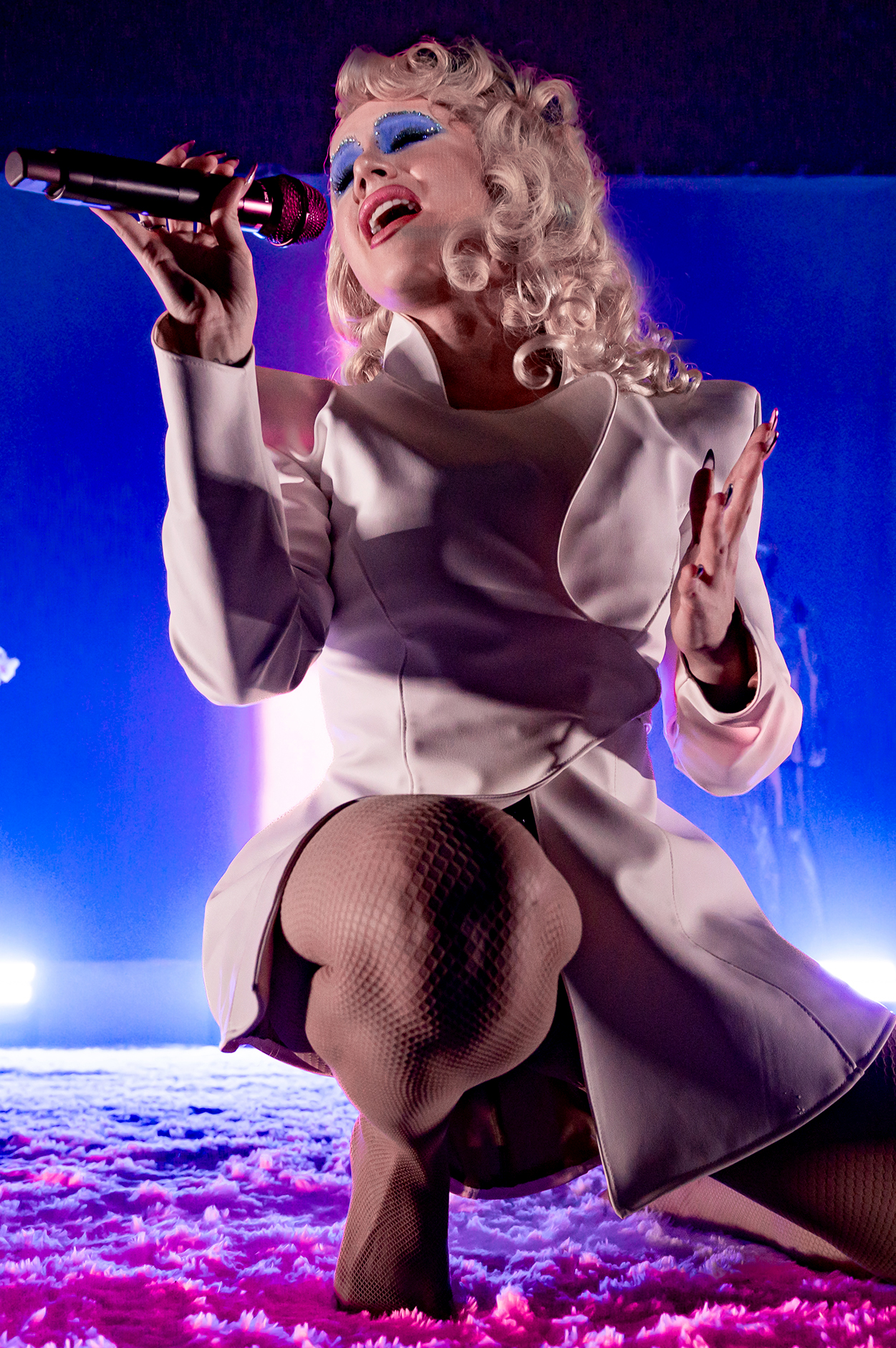
Slayyyter performing at The Novo in Downtown Los Angeles, November 2023

On October 4, 2022, Tove Lo announced that Slayyyter would be the opening act on the North American leg of Lo's Dirt Femme Tour. Slayyyter also teased new music in her own announcement. On June 9, 2023, Slayyyter released the synth-pop single "Out of Time", which Nylon called a "sleek" return after Troubled Paradise. On July 20, she announced her second studio album, Starfucker, "Out of Time" serving as its lead single. The next day, the album's second single "Miss Belladonna" came out. On August 14, she announced the third single from Starfucker, "Erotic Electronic". The music video for the single was released on August 17, and the single was released on August 18.

Slayyyter released Starfucker on September 22, 2023, later putting out a deluxe edition of the album on December 1. The conventional electropop and dance-pop style of the album deviated from the hyperpop sound of her previous releases. It was her first charting album, debuting at No. 17 on Billboard's Top Dance/Electronic Albums chart and reached No. 10. The album was positive reviewed by critics, with several considering it one of 2023's best. Promoting the album, Slayyyter embarked on the Club Valentine Tour, 17 shows in the United States, Canada, the United Kingdom, and Ireland beginning on October 25, 2023, in Boston and concluded on February 17, 2024, in London.

As part of Spotify's "Spotify Singles" series, Slayyyter released a cover of Lady Gaga's song "Monster" on October 17, 2023. On a separate but related occasion in early 2024, Gaga commented that she "loved" a TikTok video of Slayyyter lip-syncing to her unreleased song "Brooklyn Nights". Later in April 2026, Slayyyter said that the financial failure of the Club Valentine tour and its corresponding merchandise campaign led her to reconsider her career and begin making Worst Girl in America, intending for it to be her last studio album. In July 2024, after performing at the Melt Festival in Gräfenhainichen, Germany, she traveled to Santa Margherita Ligure and Portofino, Italy eating oysters which contained vibrio bacteria. She then had a seizure, became paralyzed from the waist down, and was transported to the hospital in an ambulance. She had a quick recovery and continued touring the next day. On September 20, 2024, she released the single "No Comma". According to Slayyyter, "No Comma" was a blueprint for the sound of future album Worst Girl in America, and was inspired by Miami culture and M.I.A.'s album Maya (2010). The artist considered releasing "No Comma" as a part of a reloaded version of her 2019 mixtape Slayyyter.

In October 2024, Slayyyter hosted a DJ set in Washington, D.C. for Boiler Room, at which she performed a song which became "Broke Bitch Freestyle", released during the Worst Girl in America album cycle. In July 2025, she threw the first pitch at a St. Louis Cardinals home game. In summer 2025, after releasing the "girl power" single "Attention!" with Kesha and Rose Gray, the trio toured together on the Tits Out Tour.

=== 2025–present: Worst Girl in America and Worst Man in America ===
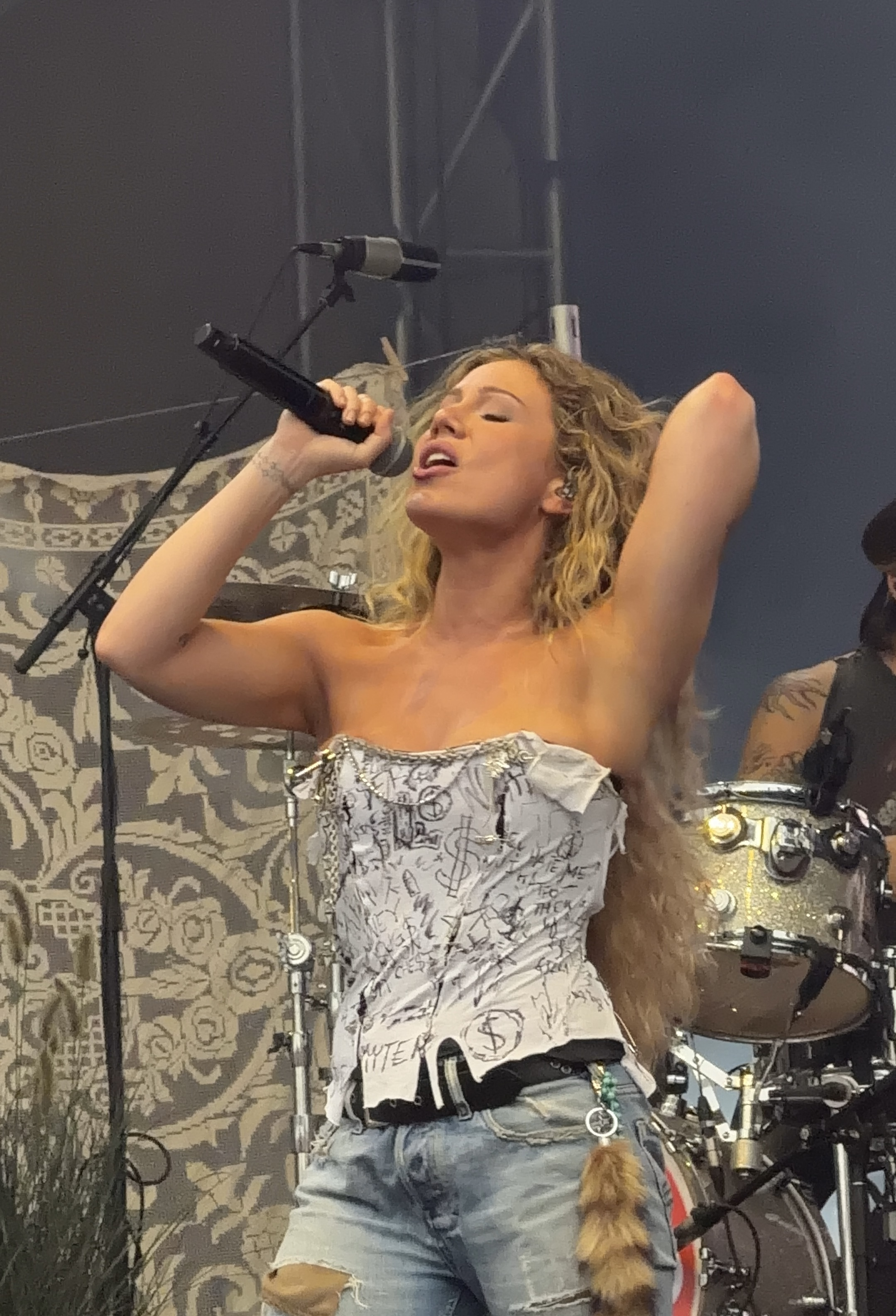
Slayyyter performing in Edmonton, Alberta on July 18, 2026

In a July interview, Slayyyter revealed that she would be based in Brooklyn, New York instead of Los Angeles. On August 1, 2025, she released "Beat Up Chanels," the lead single from her upcoming third studio album, accompanied by a music video. On the same day, Columbia Records announced that they had signed her. The second single, "Cannibalism!," and its corresponding music video, were released on September 12, 2025. A month later, she released the album's third single and its music video, titled "Crank", on October 24, 2025. On January 13, 2026, she announced her third studio album, Worst Girl in America, alongside the release date for the album's fourth single, titled "Dance...". On February 22, 2026, she announced a fifth single and its music video, titled "Old Technology," released on February 24.

Worst Girl in America was released on March 27, 2026, as a visual album; every track was accompanied by its own music video or visualizer. The album debuted at No. 1 on the Billboard Top Dance/Electronic Albums chart and at No. 22 on the Billboard Hot 200, selling 27,000 equivalent units in its first week, her highest achievement during her career. Worst Girl in America was heavily inspired by 2000s and 2010s-era pop, punk, and hip-hop music, which Slayyyter called "iPod Music." Conceptually, Slayyyter sought to break away from the commercial appeal of Starfucker, instead embracing her own musical aspirations. She and others used vocal distortion and live instrumentation on the album. For visuals, the artist embraced DIY aesthetics and film references, inspired by David Lynch's Inland Empire (2006) and Harmony Korine's Gummo (1997). The album was commended by critics. In April 2026, she made her debut at the 2026 Coachella festival, performing on the Mojave Stage. Her set included performances of songs from the new album, including "Crank," "Beat Up Chanels," and "St. Loser." The performance received widespread critical acclaim and drew a record-breaking crowd for its afternoon time slot, with multiple media outlets describing it as a "breakout moment" in her career. For her week 2 performance, she officially released her song "Broke Bitch Freestyle" and performed it as the opening to her set. The song was first performed as an intro to her song "Purrr" during her September 2024 Boiler Room Set in Washington, DC. She embarked on the Worst Girl in the World Tour in support of the album in 2026. Several tour dates were cancelled after she was diagnosed with laryngitis and vocal cord tears in October 2026.

On May 19, 2026, Slayyyter made her TV debut on The Tonight Show Starring Jimmy Fallon, performing the track "Dance..." from Worst Girl in America. In June 2026, she teased a "brother" album to Worst Girl in America.

Slayyyter released the lead single from Worst Man in America, "Brand New Chanels", on July 31, 2026, accompanied by a music video. The single released nearly a year after "Beat Up Chanels", the song which it directly inverses. On the same day, Slayyyter played at the 2026 Lollapalooza festival, performing on the Bud Light stage. She garnered a crowd of over 50,000, her largest yet. "Crank 2", a sequel to the 2025 single "Crank", was first previewed on September 7, 2026, and released three days later.

On October 9, 2026, Slayyyter released the third single to her album, titled "I Think He's Got a Girl", accompanied by a self-directed and filmed music video. On November 6, 2026, Slayyyter released the fourth single to her album, titled "Hey Boyyy", followed with a music video.

On November 16, 2026, Slayyyter received four nominations at the 69th Annual Grammy Awards, including three for her album, Worst Girl in America, and Best New Artist.

== Artistry ==
=== Influences and musical style ===
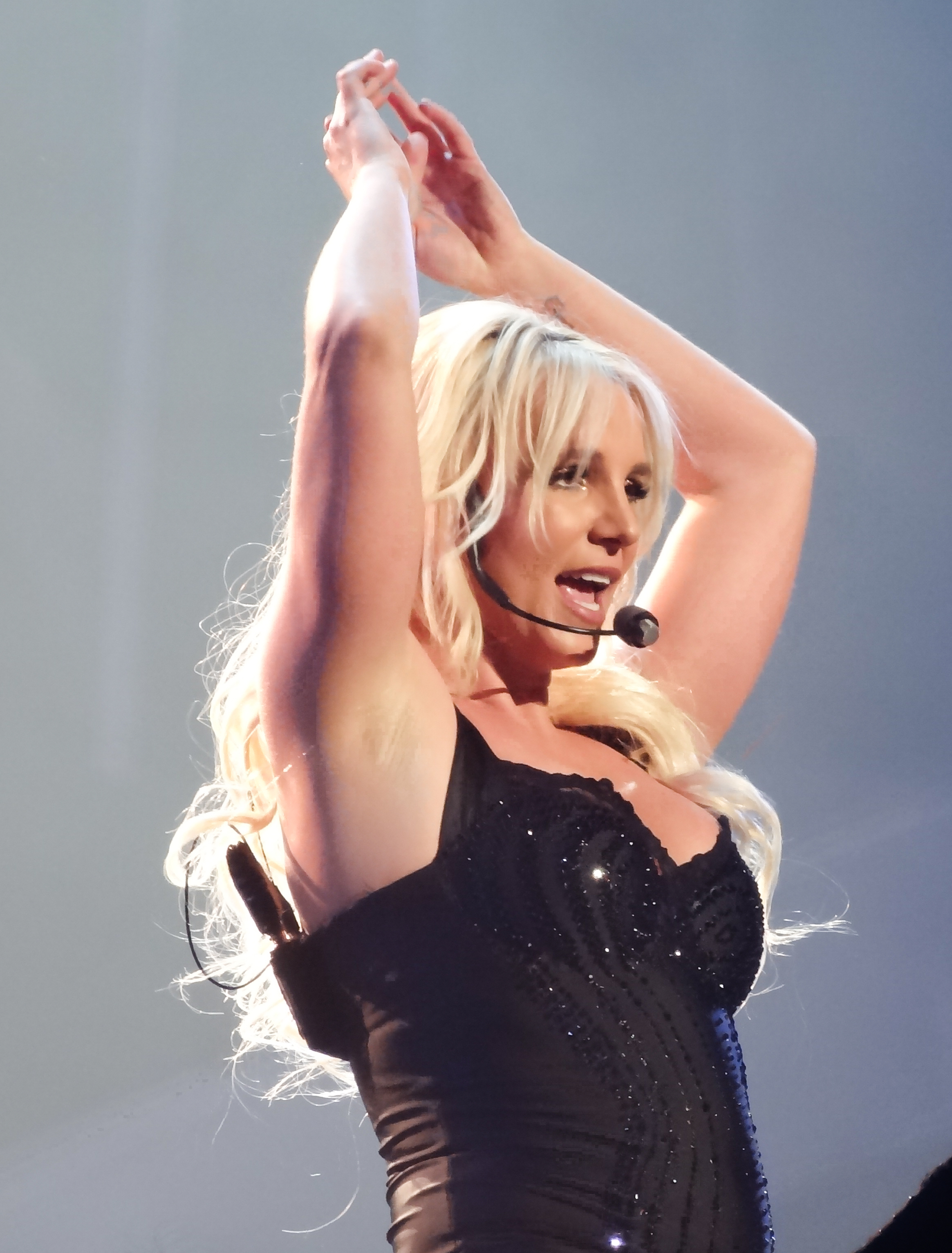
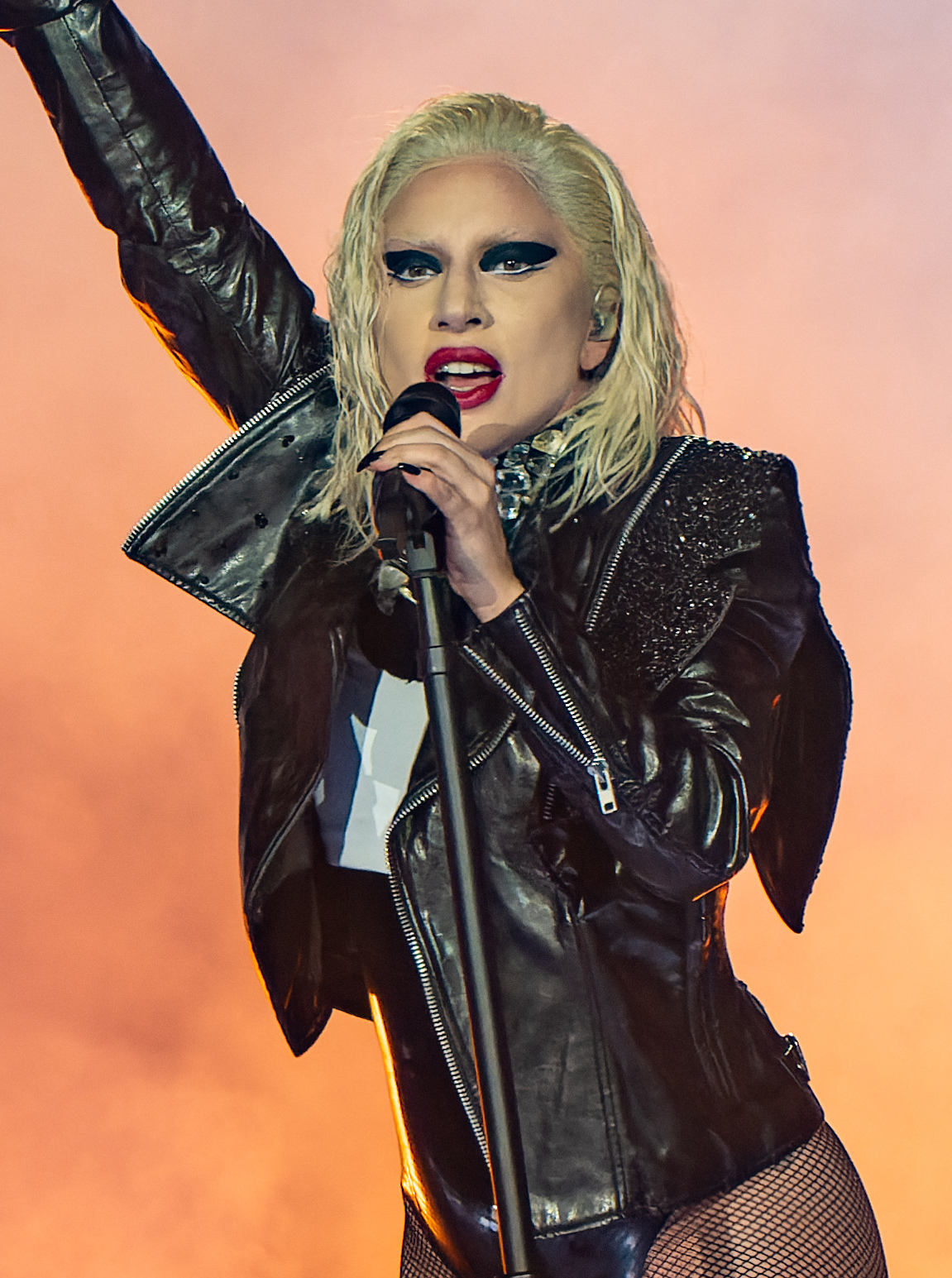
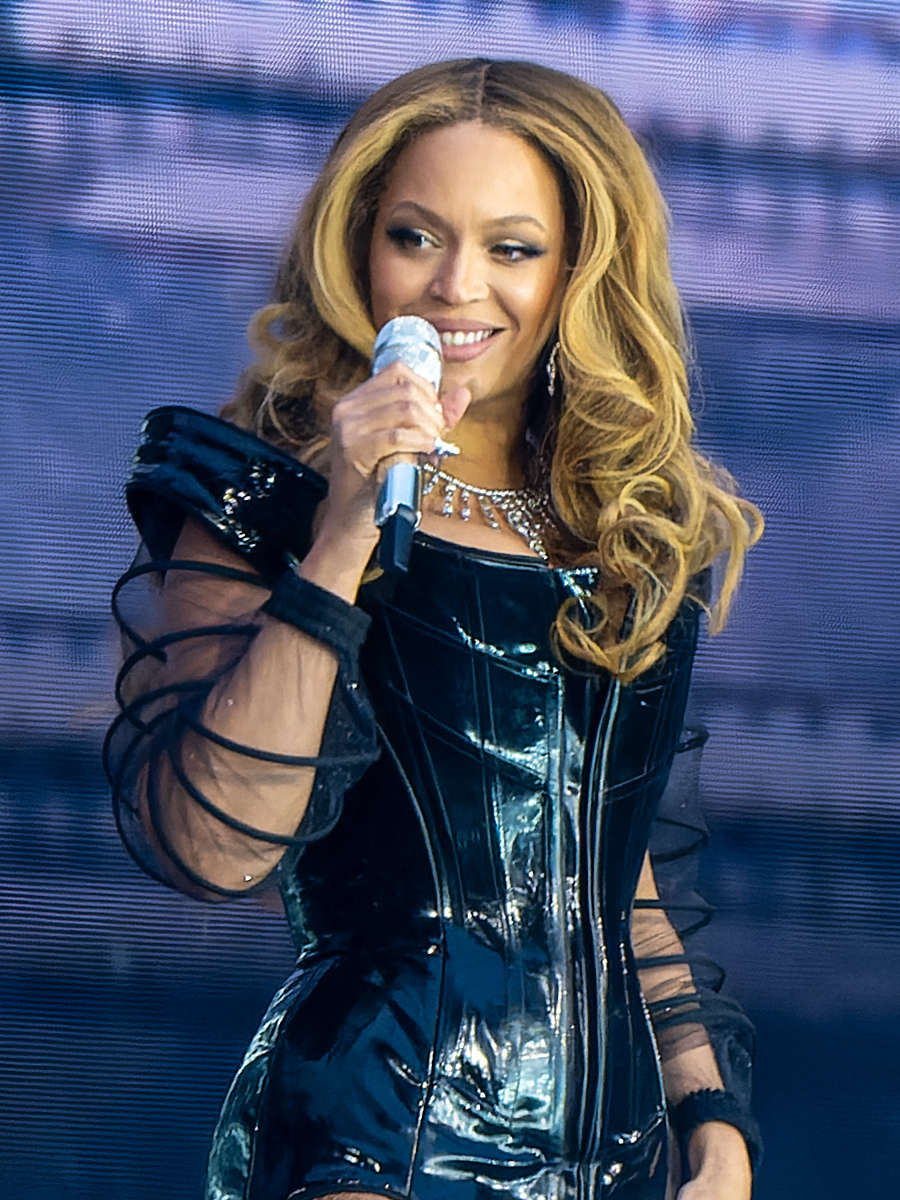
Slayyyter credits artists such as (left to right) Britney Spears, Lady Gaga, and Beyoncé as major musical influences.

Slayyyter is primarily considered a pop artist. Various sources referred to her as a hyperpop musician during her early career, but she herself says that the label does not accurately reflect her sound and she "want(s) to be seen as a pop vocalist". Her music style has been likened to Britney Spears, Lindsay Lohan, and Paris Hilton, as well as sounding "like Charli XCX on whippets". Slayyyter cites Spears, Lady Gaga, and Beyoncé as major musical influences and the pop stars whom she idolized the most growing up. She cites Blackout by Spears and The Fame by Gaga as the two pop albums which have "affected (her) most" in her life. She adds B'Day by Beyoncé to define her "holy trinity of pop albums". Other artists who have influenced her musical style include Kesha, M.I.A., Timbaland, Gwen Stefani, Nelly Furtado, Ayesha Erotica, Marina and the Diamonds, Lana Del Rey, Taylor Swift, Justin Timberlake, Madonna, Heidi Montag, Janet Jackson, and Whitney Houston.

During her Starfucker album cycle, Slayyyter shifted dramatically to a more mainstream and cinematic 1980s synthwave and synthpop-driven electropop and dark industrial club sound with nu-disco influences. She says her third album, Worst Girl in America, is a punk, electronic, club, and house music album with some influences from her second album, but has said that she feels like she's transitioning to an entirely new, more mature sound.

=== Visual and artistic style ===
Slayyyter's visual style is said to be "distinct MySpace-era". She frequently collaborated with Glitchmood, an artist from the U.K. for visuals, during her early career. During that time, Slayyyter's style was inspired by Nicole Richie, Paris Hilton, Pamela Anderson, and other "polarizing" celebrities in Y2K fashion. She thought of dressing like them as rebelling against her mother, who called them "trashy" during Slayyyter's adolescence.

== Personal life ==
Slayyyter has lived in Bushwick, Brooklyn since 2025; however, she announced in June 2026 that she would be moving back to Los Angeles. Slayyyter grew up "super Catholic" and went to a Catholic grade school in St. Louis on a full scholarship because her family did not have the money for tuition. During her education, she felt restricted by the church's rigid definition of Christianity and began identifying as an atheist. She says that she has a personal connection to God and spirituality to this day. All of her tattoos are of Catholic icons, and she has Jesus's name tattooed on her arm.

Slayyyter is bisexual. She supports the LGBTQ+ community and has performed at Los Angeles Pride. She is a lover of burlesque performance and drag; her favorite drag queen is Violet Chachki. A cinephile, Slayyyter has expressed admiration for the work of Richard Linklater, Sean Baker, Brittany Murphy, and Brian De Palma. Uptown Girls, Spun, Eyes Wide Shut, Josie and the Pussycats, Basic Instinct, Jesus Christ Superstar, and Showgirls are among her favorite movies. Slayyyter's favorite director is David Lynch, and she was inspired by his hands-on approach to direction when self-directing "Cannibalism!" in 2025. Slayyyter is also a lover of horror movies and body horror, especially The Substance.

In 2020, tweets from Slayyyter's account as a teenager resurfaced, in which she used racist and derogatory language. She addressed the controversy in an open letter and apologized for her words, while also pledging to donate money from vinyl and CD sales to charities supporting the Black LGBTQ+ community. In October 2026, she again faced scrutiny over said tweets.

In November 2023, Slayyyter said that she was a "big advocate" for gun control. Slayyyter has said that alcoholism and ADHD run in her family. She has been diagnosed with ADHD and has shared her struggles with alcohol and drug use throughout her career. She previously tried to keep her real name private, going by the pseudonym Catherine Slater, which has been referenced in media as her real name, in an attempt to keep fans and press away from her family.

== Discography ==
Studio albums

- Troubled Paradise (2021)
- Starfucker (2023)
- Worst Girl in America (2026)
- Worst Man in America (2026)

== Tours ==
=== Headlining ===
- The Mini Tour (2019)
- Club Paradise Tour (2022)
- Club Valentine Tour (2023–2024)
- Worst Girl in the World Tour (2026)

=== Supporting ===
- Charli XCX – Charli Live Tour (2019)
- Tove Lo – Dirt Femme Tour (2023)
- Fletcher – In Search of the Antidote Tour (2024)
- Kesha and Scissor Sisters – The Tits Out Tour (2025)

== Awards and nominations ==
| Year | Award | Category | Recipient(s) and nominee(s) | Result | Ref. |
|---|---|---|---|---|---|
| 2026 | MTV Video Music Awards | Best Dance | "Dance..." | Nominated | |
| 2026 | MTV Video Music Awards | Song of Summer | "Brand New Chanels" | Nominated | |
| 2026 | Variety Hitmakers Awards | Breakthrough Artist of the Year | Herself | Won | |
| 2027 | Grammy Awards | Best New Artist | Herself | Pending | |
| 2027 | Grammy Awards | Best Dance/Electronic Album | Worst Girl in America | Pending | |
| 2027 | Grammy Awards | Best Dance Pop Recording | "Dance..." | Pending | |
| 2027 | Grammy Awards | Best Dance/Electronic Recording | "Crank" | Pending | |
