= Old Technology =

2026 single by Slayyyter

Single by Slayyyter

from the album Worst Girl in America
- Released: February 24, 2026
- Genre: Bloghouse; electro-punk
- Length: 2:39
- Label: Columbia
- Songwriters: Slayyyter; Jakob Rabitsch
- Producer: Yakob

Slayyyter singles chronology
"Dance..." (2026)	"Old Technology" (2026)	"Broke Bitch Freestyle" (2026)

Music video
- "Old Technology" on YouTube

"Old Technology" (stylized in all caps) is a song by American singer and songwriter Slayyyter. It was released on February 24, 2026 as the fifth and final single from her third studio album, Worst Girl in America (2026).

== Background ==
The song was repeatedly teased on social media by Slayyyter a month before its official release.

== Composition ==
A bloghouse and electro-punk song, "Old Technology" is described as "an exploration of drug abuse, relapse and self-destruction" and an ode to bygone technologies like digital cameras, turntables, iPods, and personal stereos.

== Critical reception ==
Writing for Billboard Philippines, Gabriel Saulog stated about the song: "the American musician blending the genres of techno, rap, and pop in one seamless package leading up to an explosive chorus with shredding guitars and hard-hitting bass elements. Yet even with its grunge and grimey elements, it still stands as a fine example of Slayyyter's status as a pop auteur unlike many of her contemporaries". XO Diva gave a positive review of the song citing that "'Old Technology' feels like the final puzzle piece in a perfect pre-album five-pack: the kind of roll out that has fans counting down the days, refreshing their apps, and fully ready to claim this as their pop record of the year".

== Music video ==
The black-and-white music video was directed by Slayyyter herself and was shot and edited by her collaborator, Kaitlyn Muro, who also edited the music videos for all of the previous Worst Girl in America singles.
