= Worst Girl in America =

Studio album by Slayyyter
- Released: March 27, 2026
- Recorded: 2023–2025
- Genre: Electroclash
- Length: 42:17
- Label: Columbia
- Producers: Austin Corona; Hamish; Owen Jackson; Valley Girl; Wyatt Bernard; Yakob

Slayyyter chronology
Starfucker (2023)	Worst Girl in America (2026)	Worst Man in America (2026)

Singles from Worst Girl in America
- 1. "Beat Up Chanels" Released: August 1, 2025; 2. "Cannibalism!" Released: September 12, 2025; 3. "Crank" Released: October 24, 2025; 4. "Dance..." Released: January 16, 2026; 5. "Old Technology" Released: February 24, 2026

Worst Girl in America (stylised as WOR$T GIRL IN AMERICA) is the third studio album and major label debut album by American singer-songwriter Slayyyter. It was released on March 27, 2026, through Columbia Records. The album is inspired by Slayyyter's upbringing in St. Louis and characters from her adolescence, the artist calling it a "portrait of a woman from the Midwest". Musically, it incorporates elements of electropop, industrial hip-hop, punk and nu metal, continuing her maximalist, internet-influenced sound while expanding into more narrative-driven songwriting. The album was preceded by five singles and followed by two promotional singles.

Worst Girl in America debuted at number 22 on the US Billboard 200 and topped the Top Dance Albums chart, moving 27,000 album-equivalent units and marking her highest-charting release to date. It received widespread acclaim upon release, with praise for its production, stylistic range, cohesion, and Slayyyter's vocal performance. Slayyyter supported the album's release with live performances at the 2026 Coachella festival. A "brother album" to Worst Girl in America, titled Worst Man in America, is set for release on December 4, 2026, serving as both a standalone release and a reissue of the album. The album received a nomination for Best Dance/Electronic Album at the 69th Annual Grammy Awards.

== Background and development ==
In comparison to her earlier releases Troubled Paradise and Starfucker, Slayyyter described the album as "more authentically her" and one where she tried revisiting the formative sounds from her teenage years. The album is also inspired by the music she grew up listening to on her iPod, which consisted of a mix of pop, punk, and rap music. Slayyyter's sonic inspirations for the project included How to Dismantle an Atomic Bomb by U2, The Fame by Lady Gaga, and Yeezus by Kanye West, as well as artists Santigold, M.I.A., Kid Cudi, Gorillaz, Ladytron, Soulwax, Sebastian, Death Grips, Crystal Castles, A$AP Rocky, Madonna, Coldplay, and The White Stripes. Slayyyter also took inspiration from Space Cowboy's production on projects by Nadia Oh and Gaga.

Slayyyter said that the album's title, Worst Girl in America, came from her St. Louis skater friends calling each other the "worst" as a term of endearment, as well the hangover anxiety she feels after a night of partying. She elaborated on this concept, saying that the album came from feelings of frustration and anger at being perpetually considered an "up-and-coming" artist. On Worst Girl, she felt free to reclaim her own artistic image and make music for herself instead of a commercial audience or for TikTok fame. Slayyyter said she would never call herself or feel like a celebrity, criticized the class divide between celebrity and consumer, and labeled herself an "anti-pop star". She also criticized the music industry's "cliquey and performative" nature and fake relationships between industry figures.

Slayyyter stated that while making this album, she considered it the last album she would make. This attitude led her to make music that satisfied her own musical aspirations rather than the music industry's. This album was Slayyyter's last-ditch effort at making something she would be proud of, after being "sick of" losing money on underperforming album rollouts and tours. Slayyyter said that after this album's release, she would continue exploring new sounds, and no longer try to cater to mainstream attention.

The artist said that her past albums include "glimmers" of Worst Girl in America, including the lead single from Troubled Paradise, "Self Destruct".

== Composition ==
For her vocal styling on "Brittany Murphy.", Slayyyter used Auto-Tune and sang in a robotic voice in order to feel comfortable performing the song's dark and personal lyrics. Slayyyter's album persona was heavily inspired by Brittany Murphy and her film roles. She also presented the main character as a "Pick Me Girl" who only hangs out with men.

Slayyyter intentionally chose not to have multiple other songwriters in the room while making the album, keeping the recording process between her and the producers. Slayyyter and her collaborators used a distortion technique to alter her vocals on multiple of the album's songs. In preparation for her live performances, she watched screamo singing tutorials on TikTok.

=== Songs ===
The song "Dance…" was a reference for the rest of the album's songs, according to Slayyyter, since it was one of the first songs she wrote for the project. It was initially supposed to be Worst Girl in America's lead single.

Slayyyter stated in July 2025 that "Beat Up Chanels" was her "magnum opus," and in March 2026 said that it was the best song she'd ever made. She described the song as an exploration into her "aggressive rap" sound while also leaning into her sadder "soft pop" vocals.

"Old Technology" was another one of the first songs Slayyyter wrote for the album. She described it as an "electro punk" exploration of drug abuse, relapse, and self-destruction.

"Crank" includes a sonic reference to Beyoncé's 2006 single "Ring the Alarm".

"Gas Station" was one of the first songs which defined the project's "iPod Music” concept, and was inspired by indie electronic music from 2010 to 2011. In an interview with The Fader, Slayyyter revealed that while the synth pad-driven track was initially written about an ex-boyfriend, it ultimately transitioned into a song about her estranged father, with whom she shares a "rocky relationship." The chorus was specifically inspired by a solemn childhood memory of him leaving her alone at a gas station. However, Slayyyter noted that the vocal delivery intentionality subverts the gravity of the situation, adding that "the way I sing the chorus feels not so serious" and expressing hope that listeners would find their own personal interpretations of the track.

According to Slayyyter, "Unknown Loverz" was written as an “insecure" song about having a crush on someone, marking a contrast from the sound of "Yes Goddd”.

“I'm Actually Kinda Famous" was a bridge between Starfucker and Worst Girl, according to Slayyyter, in which she attempted to describe the feeling of convincing yourself that you're important at a party. The second half of the song was inspired by LSD-induced hallucinations and feelings of insecurity.

Slayyyter called "Brittany Murphy." a "very personal diary entry" about her suicidal thoughts and feelings while making the album. In the song, Slayyyter compared her own experiences with girlhood and maturation to those of Brittany Murphy and her character in the Uptown Girls, Molly Gunn.

== Artwork and visuals ==
The front album cover was shot by Alexa Zeliger and features Slayyyter wearing a suede fringe jacket alongside Chandler Burton. Worst Girl in America is a visual album, with corresponding music videos for each song.

Slayyyter, who styled the album campaign herself, first began thinking about visuals for Worst Girl in Spring 2024, inspired by posts she'd been seeing on Tumblr. These included inspirations from Catholic imagery, the "trash Midwest glamor" of her childhood, as well as fan edits, GIFs, and Lana Del Rey's visuals. Slayyyter intentionally chose not to have a "posed pop star image" for the album cover, reacting against the "stylized, airbrushed, glam" visuals of Starfucker. Instead, she modeled it after album covers by male rappers and cultural elements of straight men like skateboarding and Supreme. Slayyyter stated that the album's dollar sign imagery was an act to parody wealth, as her family struggled with poverty during her childhood and she continues to struggle with financial illiteracy today. Slayyyter's other visual inspirations include Lindsey Lohan and Paris Hilton's 2000s paparazzi shots, and Kate Moss' muddy rainboots at Glastonbury Festival 2005 which inspired the album's cover. Slayyyter said that the "Cannibalism!" music video visuals reference her time as a hair salon receptionist during her early music career.

Despite having funding from Columbia Records, Slayyyter used cheap materials, sets and furniture in her own house, and DIY materials and costumes for album visuals, to replicate its "ugly" sound. For the "Beat Up Chanels" and "Dance…" music videos, Slayyyter posed in front of public Fourth of July and New Year's Eve celebrations, respectively, for her shots of fireworks. A lover of film, Slayyyter was also influenced by David Lynch's films and Harmony Korine's Gummo, a "creepy portrait of the midwest," in creating the album's visuals.

=== Rabbit motif ===
A notable recurring character in the music videos and performances is a man in a rabbit suit, inspired by Rabbits scenes featured in Inland Empire. She describes him as "menacing-looking" and "perverted", representing many things, such as internal struggles and misremembered childhood memories. Slayyyter said that the character was also inspired by her childhood house, which her mother decorated with various artwork of rabbits.

== Singles and promotion ==
On September 6, 2024, Slayyyter used a drop text number to coincide with the release of her single "No Comma". It was reinstated as a sign-up feature on the official Slayyyter website to promote Worst Girl in America, stylized as an RSVP, auto-texting fans who enrolled about release dates for future singles and their artwork, video announcements, and merchandise.

"Beat Up Chanels" was released as the album's first single on August 1, 2025, alongside the announcement of her new record deal with Columbia Records. Slayyyter had completed most of the album by the time she signed with the new label. This was followed by "Cannibalism!" on September 12, 2025. "Crank" was released as the third single on October 24, 2025. "Dance...", originally meant to be the album's lead single, was released as the fourth single on January 13, 2026, coinciding with the announcement of the album. The fifth and final single "Old Technology" was released on February 24, 2026. On March 16, 2026, Slayyyter announced the Worst Girl in the World Tour, kicking off on July 26 in St. Louis.

In the lead up to Worst Girl’s release beginning in October 2025, the lyrics "I get so gay off that tequila” from "Crank" went viral on social media sites like TikTok. Fans often captioned pictures of YouTuber lilsimsie with the lyrics, and re-captioned other photos in the format “I Get So X Off That Y."

Slayyyter debuted several tracks from Worst Girl in America, including "Dance...", "Yes Goddd", and "St. Loser", during her set at Homobloc in Manchester on December 6, 2025. Slayyyter also said on April 15 that she was interested in releasing more music throughout 2026, including demos and songs which didn't make it onto the album.

On April 17, 2026, Slayyyter surprise-released the single "Broke Bitch Freestyle". The song was first performed by the singer in 2024 during her Boiler Room set in Washington, D.C., and had since become one of the most highly anticipated tracks from the album. The track's release fueled rumors of an upcoming deluxe edition of the album, particularly after Slayyyter called it her favorite song of the album on X. Additionally, the singer opened her second Coachella performance with the song.

In late April 2026, PETA, an animal rights group, criticized Slayyyter for wearing fox fur during the Worst Girl in America album cycle. She quickly countered these claims, pointing to PETA's poor animal rights record, and the fact that her furs are "vintage and antique," not purchased firsthand. PETA claimed that wearing furs normalizes the fur industry, but Slayyyter said that wearing vintage clothing actually normalizes sustainable consumption.

She made her late-night television debut performing "Dance..." on The Tonight Show Starring Jimmy Fallon on May 19, 2026.

== Critical reception ==
Professional ratings
Aggregate scores
Source	Rating
AnyDecentMusic?	7.6/10
Metacritic	85/100
Review scores
Source	Rating
AllMusic	4/5 stars
Clash	8/10
The Needle Drop	6/10
NME	4/5 stars
Pitchfork	8.2/10
PopMatters	9/10
Slant Magazine	3.5/5 stars

Worst Girl in America received widespread acclaim from music critics. At Metacritic, which assigns a weighted average rating out of 100 to reviews from mainstream publications, the album received an average score of 85, based on six reviews, indicating "universal acclaim". The review aggregator Any Decent Music gave the album a weighted average score of 7.6 out of 10 from seven critic reviews.

Matt Collar's review for AllMusic noted the influences Slayyyter drew from throughout the tracklist: the "shimmering, Ray of Light-era Madonna-isms of 'Gas Station,' the Blondie-esque 'Unknown Loverz,' and the Robyn-like 'Old Fling$' with its rising EDM chorus". Collar praised Slayyyter for never failing to make these songs feel her own in spite of their callbacks to the dance music of the 2000s and 2010s. For Collar, Worst Girl in America marked an evolution of the sound of Troubled Paradise and Starfucker, "fusing the classic Britney Spears teen R&B sound with the wry, in-your-face swagger of Kesha" with even more verve than before.

Writing for Slant Magazine, Alexander Mooney stated that the album "channels all of [Slayyyter's] wildest impulses, but its clamorous highs and thrumming lows are meted out with care and precision". Contrasting the record to Starfucker, Mooney opined that Worst Girl in America marked "more of a sonic achievement than a thematic one" for Slayyyter, where she "find[s] a sound that’s unmistakably hers". For Mooney, the album was ultimately "more of a conceptual riff on the up(per)s and down(er)s of acting out than the statement of intent suggested by its virtuosic production".

Robin Murray of Clash praised the record as a "pop meteorite ready to leave an outlandish crater on the side of pop culture" and catapult Slayyyter into the mainstream. While remaining true to the singer's characteristic "rave-pop effervescence", Murray found the album to be more "concise and packed with intention" than earlier works, indicating that Slayyyter has "built on her past, learned from her mistakes, and seems ready to seize her throne". Pitchfork awarded the album their Best New Music distinction. Harry Tafoya's review compared Slayyyter's improvement on her earlier work to that of Charli XCX from Crash (2022) to Brat (2024): like Brat, Worst Girl in America "achieves its bite by chucking pop prettiness out the window and swerving hard into club antagonism". Slayyyter dismissed comparisons of her and Charli XCX in a previous interview, saying they didn't know each other and operated in separate parts of the music industry. This shift enables a heightened vulnerability compared to Slayyyter's previous releases, since "chaos doesn’t simply heighten her music’s pathos but underlines her humanity".

At the 69th Annual Grammy Awards, Worst Girl in America was nominated for Best Dance/Electronic Album, while two of its singles "Crank" and "Dance..." were nominated for Best Dance/Electronic Recording and Best Dance Pop Recording, respectively.

== Track listing ==
Worst Girl in America track listing
No.	Title	Writer(s)	Producer(s)	Length
1.	"Dance..."	Slayyyter; Nate Campany; Kyle Shearer	Valley Girl	4:47
2.	"Beat Up Chanels"	Slayyyter; Austin Corona; Wyatt Bernard	Corona; Bernard^{[a]}	3:18
3.	"Cannibalism!"	Slayyyter; Corona; Bernard	Corona; Bernard^{[a]}	2:47
4.	"Old Technology"	Slayyyter; Jacob Rabitsch	Yakob	2:39
5.	"Crank"	Slayyyter; Corona; Bernard	Corona; Bernard^{[a]}	2:55
6.	"Gas Station"	Slayyyter; Marvy Ayy	Marvy Ayy	3:38
7.	"Yes Goddd"	Slayyyter; Jordan Palmer	Palmer	2:39
8.	"Unknown Loverz"	Slayyyter; Jeremy Malvin	Chrome Sparks	3:19
9.	"Old Flings"	Slayyyter; Jean Baptiste; Karl Rubin; Ryan Buendia; Christian Astrop	Beau Nox; Jean Baptiste; Rubin; Buendia	3:37
10.	"I'm Actually Kinda Famous"	Slayyyter; Nicolas DiPietrantonio	Nicopop	2:36
11.	"St. Loser"	Slayyyter; Owen Jackson; Callie Reiff; Miles Comaskey	Jackson; Jawn Legend; Reiff; Comaskey	3:35
12.	"What Is It Like, to Be Liked?"	Slayyyter; Philip von Boch Scully; Ben Darwish; Tobias Wincorn	Darwish; Phil Scully	2:18
13.	"*Prayer*"	Slayyyter; Jackson	Jackson	0:37
14.	"Brittany Murphy."	Slayyyter; Bernard; Corona	Corona; Bernard	3:44
Total length:				42:17

Notes

- ^{^[a]} signifies an additional producer
- ^{^[v]} signifies a vocal producer
- All track titles are stylized in all caps.
- "Beat Up Chanels", "Old Flings", and "St. Loser" are stylized with the dollar sign instead of the letter S ("BEAT UP CHANEL$", "OLD FLING$", and "$T. LOSER", respectively).

== Charts ==
Chart performance for Worst Girl in America
Chart (2026)	Peak position
Australian Albums (ARIA)	28
Belgian Albums (Ultratop Flanders)	140
Croatian International Albums (HDU)	9
Irish Albums (Official Charts)	46
New Zealand Albums (RMNZ)	23
Portuguese Albums (AFP)	45
Scottish Albums (Official Charts)	18
UK Albums (Official Charts)	36
US Billboard 200	22
US Top Dance Albums (Billboard)	1
