= The Cock Destroyers =

English pornographic double act

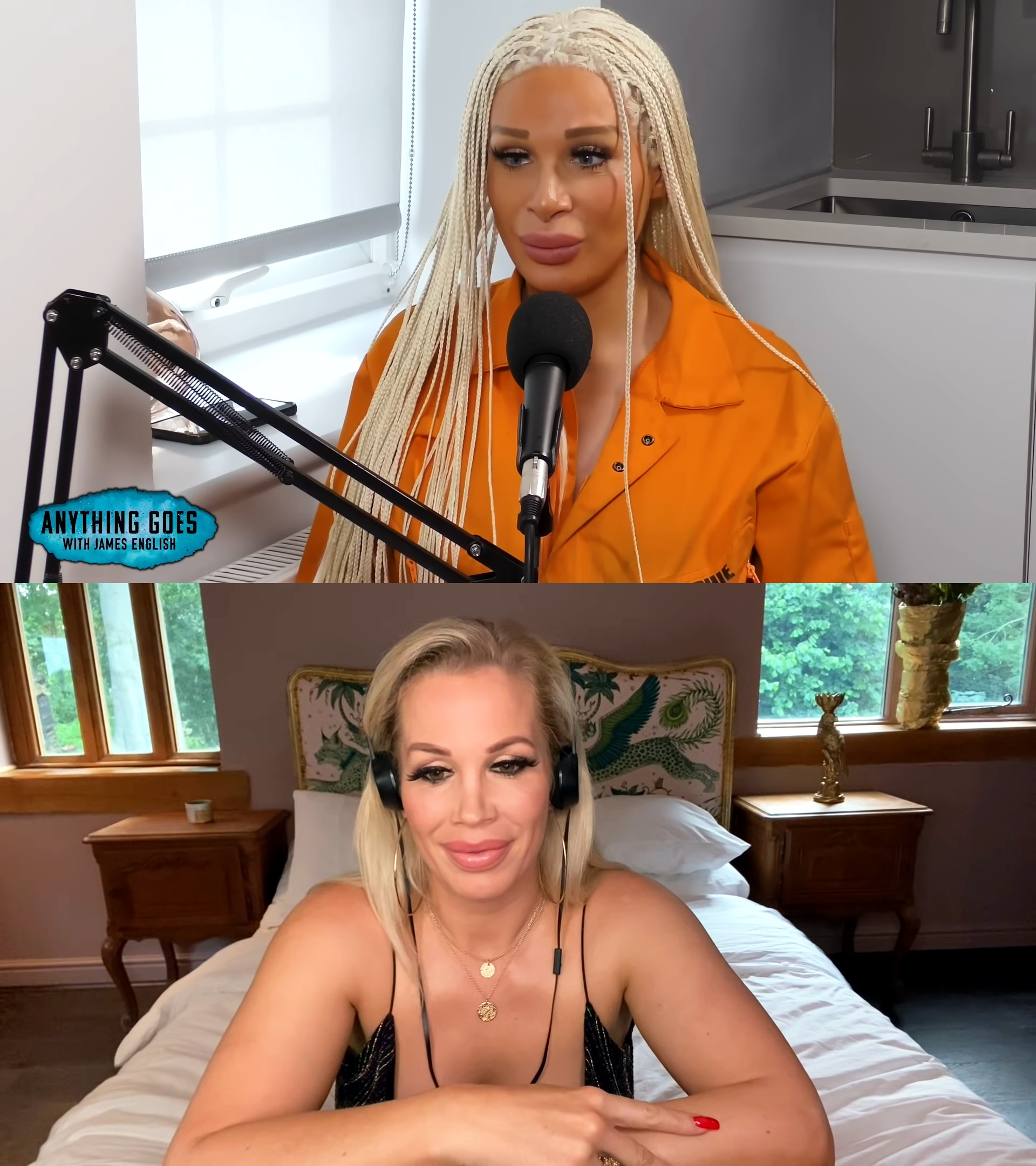
- Top: Sophie Anderson in July 2022. Bottom: Rebecca More in July 2021.
- Occupations: Pornographic actresses; internet personalities
- Years active: 2018–2021
- Television: Slag Wars: The Next Destroyer

The Cock Destroyers were a pornographic double act comprising Rebecca More and Sophie Anderson. After meeting at a British porn awards show, the pair set up a joint OnlyFans account featuring niche porn films. In October 2018, the pair uploaded a video to Twitter requesting clientele for group sex, which went viral a few weeks later after being retweeted by a drag queen and then again in March 2019 after being sampled in a King Princess track. They went on to feature in A Tale of Two Cock Destroyers and co-host Slag Wars: The Next Destroyer with Matthew Camp, both for Men.com. They also presented a sex education lesson for Netflix.

More and Anderson split up in 2021. A planned reunion on a second series of Slag Wars was thwarted by Anderson's health, though the series went ahead anyway with More, Camp, and Fantasia Royale Gaga. Anderson died in November 2023 and the second series of Slag Wars paid tribute to her. In October 2019, Blu Hydrangea, Divina de Campo, and Baga Chipz, contestants on the first series of RuPaul's Drag Race UK, named their drag girl band the Frock Destroyers after the pair; the trio became the first such band to enter the UK Top 40.

== Career ==
=== Formation and virality ===
Sophie Anderson first encountered Rebecca More after visiting her OnlyFans account. Both were pseudonymous pornographic actresses who had independently entered the sex industry via escorting and webcamming. The pair later met at a British porn awards show, shortly after which they performed together as part of a film involving a burglar at a bachelorette party in which both had sex. After bonding over their shared looks and libido, the pair began performing together in twice-daily group sex with paying customers. Anderson and More later set up their own joint OnlyFans account. In December 2020, Lillian Stone of MEL Magazine wrote that the account's contents included "the kind of imaginative, goofy porn you'd never see from mainstream porn studios", citing Who Framed Roger Rabbit spinoff "Rebecca Rabbit and Her Carrot Dick" as her personal favourite.

By late 2018, More had acquired a significant gay fanbase on Twitter; Sirin Kale of The Face wrote in July 2019 that they were interested in her "sassy theatrics and memeable promo videos". Posts were typically addressed to their "guys, girlies, and non-binary friends". In October 2018, after finishing a £300 morning session at London's St James's Hotel and Club with several clients including chief executive officers, doctors, and a police officer, the pair filmed a video in their hotel room calling out for clients for the afternoon session, which was uploaded to More's Twitter account. The 69-second video depicted the pair describing themselves as "cock destroyers" using heavy British accents and lewd gestures which, according to Conor Williams of Interview, lent the clip "a bombastic theatricality". The pair stated in the video that they were on the hunt for "six more dicks" to "despunk".

The video went viral again in early November after being retweeted by a Chicago-based drag queen and became popular among that platform's gay community, resulting in coverage from the BBC. Williams attributed the video's popularity among that market segment to the pair's "fuck without fear of judgment" attitude, which mirrored that of some queer men. The Cock Destroyers went viral during a period in which memes of pornography were popular, with clips of Cock Destroyers saying "I'm too expensive for you" and "it will be a small fee to pay, but I'm sure you won't mind" going viral around the same time. More later stated that the success of the video compelled her to upload only safe for work content to Twitter in case any further clips went viral.

In March 2019, King Princess uploaded a track to SoundCloud named after and sampling the pair, followed by a 48-second clip containing the track and several cocks, prompting the original video to go viral again. King Princess had originally crossed paths with the Cock Destroyers after she asked the pair to record a birthday message for her manager. In October 2019, the pair played non-sexual roles as a pair of rival brothel madams in A Tale of Two Cock Destroyers, a four-part series of gay pornographic scenes produced for Men.com and TLAGay. Recorded in a suburban manor estate, the video was their first venture into that genre and also featured that genre's Ty Mitchell, JJ Knight, Johnny Rapid, Joey Mills, Leander, and Jonas Jackson. Rose Dommu of Out.com described the film's vibe as "The Favourite, but with more anal".

=== Later works ===
To promote Netflix's Sex Education, the pair rebranded themselves as "sex education destroyers" in March 2020 for a one-off trans inclusive sex education video in which they walked through several facets of sex including HIV, pre-exposure prophylaxis, post-exposure prophylaxis, consent, vaginal pleasure, anal sex, and douching. Nick Duffy of PinkNews described the video's curriculum as "gloriously queer" and wrote that it "left us hoping for a full Cock Destroyers series". That November, the pair co-presented the safe for work four-part reality television series Slag Wars: The Next Destroyer alongside Matthew Camp. Narrated by Chase Icon, the series sought to find a third Cock Destroyer among seven sex workers and OnlyFans creators, who were described on the programme as Slags in an effort to reclaim the word as sex-positive. The show was streamed on Men.com and the purpose-built safe for work domain SlagWars.com.

They raised money for HIV and sexual health charity the Terrence Higgins Trust by doing a sponsored 10k run on World AIDS Day [...]. They appeared at Pride events. They reached out to LGBTQ+ people on social media who were struggling. They supported trans people during their transition. They fought against homophobia, transphobia and bigotry. They advocated for the rights and dignity of sex workers, helping to destigmatise and humanise those working in adult industries. [sic]

— Alim Kheraj of Dazed talking about the Cock Destroyers while eulogising Anderson

In May 2021, following speculation caused by More tweeting about a "viscous email" [sic] she had received, Anderson tweeted that the pair had split. More kept abreast of Anderson's life after the breakup and retired from studio work in 2023. Later that year, Anderson was scheduled to reunite with More for a second series of Slag Wars but dropped out for health reasons; she was replaced by Fantasia Royale Gaga. Anderson died in November 2023, with news of her death broken by More the month after; eulogising Anderson, Alim Kheraj of Dazed praised the pair for their staunch support of the LGBTQ and sex worker communities. The second series of Slag Wars aired on the queer streaming service Outflix from September 2024; the first episode paid tribute to Anderson and was released alongside a documentary on how the Cock Destroyers became famous.

== In popular culture ==
The pair were immortalised in the name of the drag girl band Frock Destroyers, which debuted in October 2019 and comprised that year's RuPaul's Drag Race UK contestants Blu Hydrangea, Divina de Campo, and Baga Chipz. They had formed the band as part of a challenge to write, record, and perform verses to "Break Up (Bye Bye)" and beat Filth Harmony, whose name riffed on Fifth Harmony. Upon release, the Frock Destroyers' version became the first UK Top 40 single by a drag girl band, peaking at number 35.

== Works ==
=== Filmography ===
Title	Year	Role	Ref.
A Tale of Two Cock Destroyers	2019	Brothel madams	
Slag Wars: The Next Destroyer	2020	Judges; 4 episodes	

=== Singles ===
Title	Year	Album	Ref.
"Slag Wars" (with Andrew Barret Cox and Jan featuring Mark Mauriello and Hayley Moir)	2020	Non-album single	
