= Rebecca More =

English pornographic actress (born 1980)

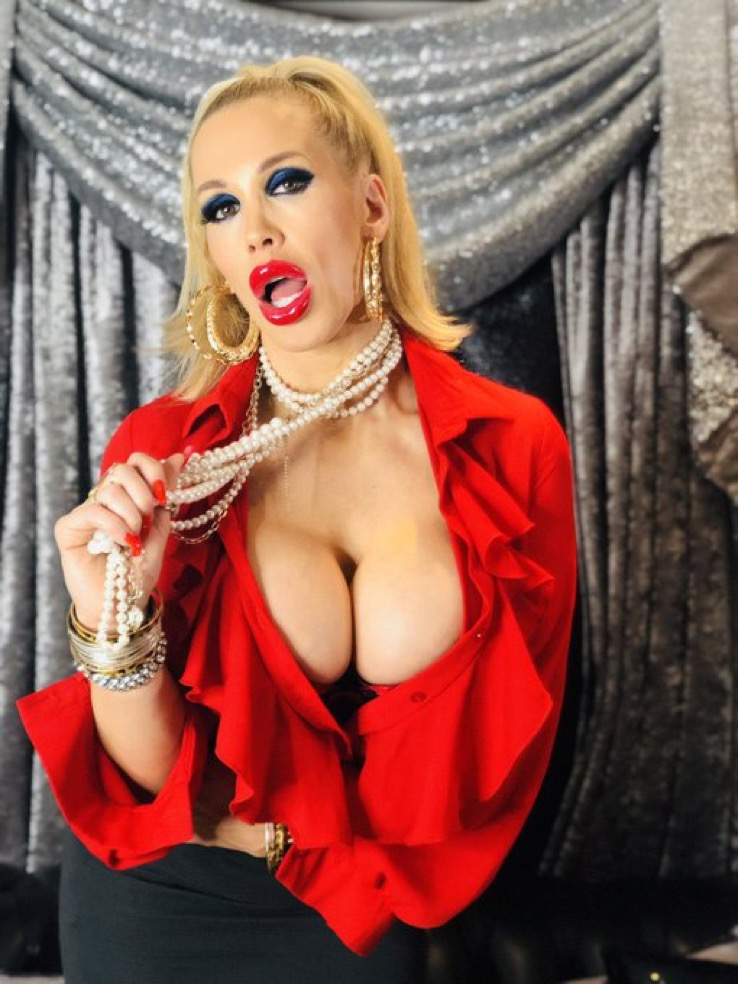
- More in 2019
- Born: Rebecca Jessica Flood; 7 August 1980 (age 46); Beaconsfield, Buckinghamshire, England
- Education: University of West London
- Occupations: Pornographic actress; internet personality
- Years active: 2010–present
- Known for: The Cock Destroyers
- Television: Slag Wars: The Next Destroyer
- Spouse: Mark Middleton-Jones (m. 2003, divorced)
- Children: 2

Rebecca Jessica Middleton-Jones (née Flood; born 7 August 1980), known professionally as Rebecca More, is an English pornographic actress and internet personality. More began her career in pornography in 2010, and went on to appear in an array of films for various different studios until her retirement from mainstream pornography in 2023. During her career, she found internet fame when she and fellow porn star Sophie Anderson, who branded themselves "The Cock Destroyers", posted a video that went viral. Both her and Anderson's videos became memes and the pair were subsequently regarded as gay icons within the LGBTQ+ community which saw them go on to front the Men.com series Slag Wars: The Next Destroyer in 2020, before they parted ways the following year. More fronted a second series of Slag Wars in 2024, as well as her own podcast, before making a one-off return to mainstream pornography in 2026.

== Early and personal life ==
More was born Rebecca Jessica Flood in Beaconsfield, Buckinghamshire on 7 August 1980. Prior to working in the adult industry, More obtained a law degree from the University of West London. She briefly worked for the Citizens Advice Bureau. She began working as a stripper and later as an escort in order to earn more money. More has two children. She married Mark Middleton-Jones in 2003; however, the marriage later ended in divorce.

== Career ==
More began her pornographic career in 2010 and appeared in over 170 pornographic films for multiple studios including Brazzers, Bang Bros, Digital Playground, Fake Taxi, Girlfriends Films and Television X. She appeared in several scenes with Jordi El Niño Polla, Keiran Lee and Danny D. More also has her own OnlyFans page, on which she posts sexual content throughout the week and also broadcasts live to her subscribers. More was also a member of the Porn Pedallers Cycling Club which raised money for the Terrence Higgins Trust, a HIV and sexual health charity.

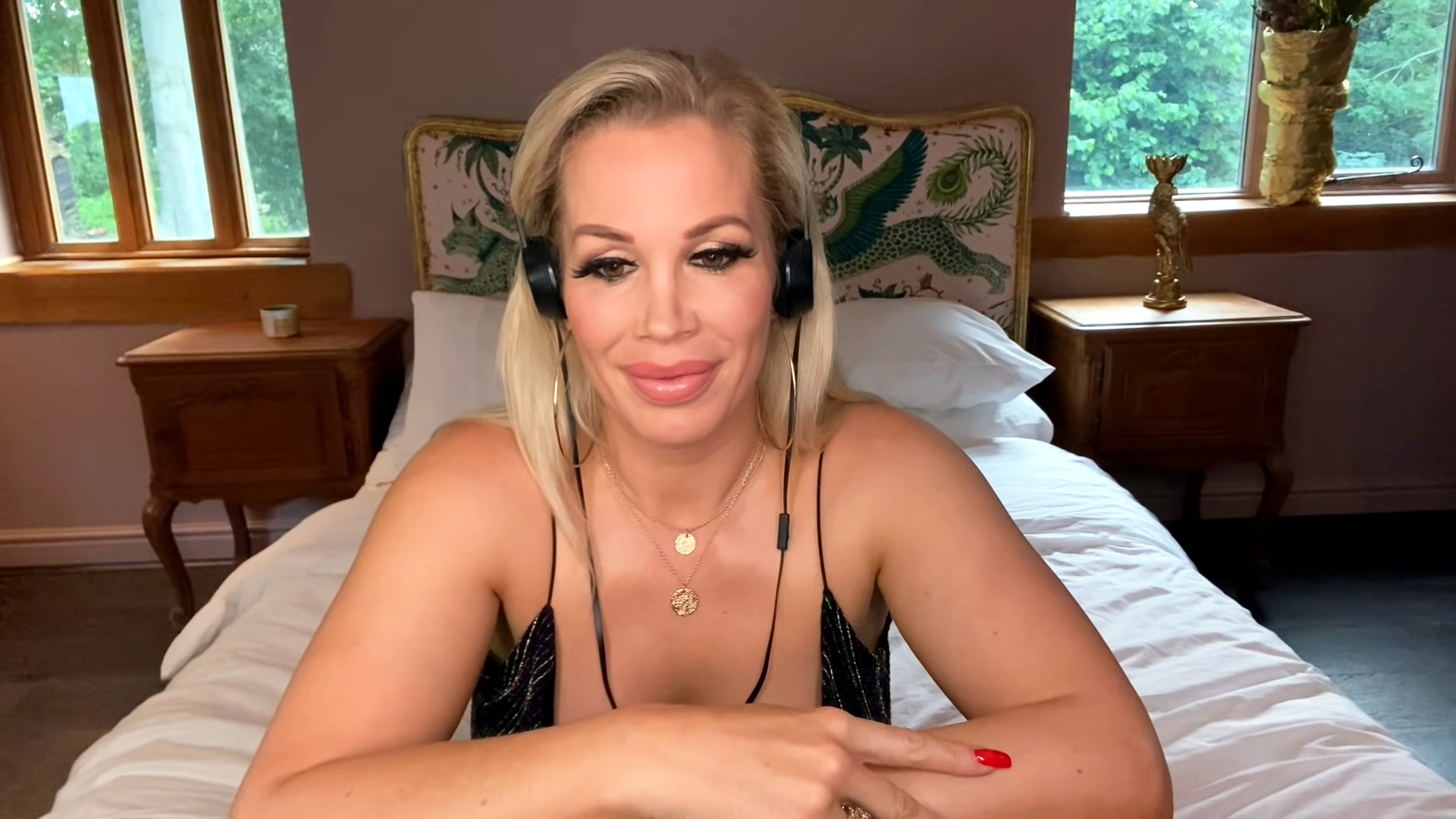
More during an interview on a podcast in July 2021

In October 2018, a video of More and fellow pornographic actress Sophie Anderson calling themselves "The Cock Destroyers" while promoting a gang bang went viral. Their sudden popularity within the LGBTQ+ community saw them obtain an internet following and they made appearances at nightclubs such as G-A-Y. In October 2019, More and Anderson, featured in a non-sex role in A Tale Of Two Cock Destroyers, a gay pornographic film for Men.com which starred actors Jonas Jackson, JJ Knight, Leander, Joey Mills, Ty Mitchell and Johnny Rapid. and in 2020 they fronted Slag Wars: The Next Destroyer alongside Matthew Camp, a reality television competition series for Men.com which followed them on their quest to discover who would be named The Next Cock Destroyer. The same year, More served as an adult film advisor on the four-part Channel 4 television drama Adult Material. In 2021, More and Anderson fell out, resulting in an indefinite hiatus of the Cock Destroyers.

In June 2023, More announced her retirement from the pornography industry, and that she would instead be focusing on her OnlyFans page and [one-to-one] videos. In November 2023, Sophie Anderson died at the age of 36, with More announcing her death on social media several days later, whilst paying tribute to her as a "bubbly, funny, kind hearted soul who was outrageous on the outside but also so gentle behind closed doors" [...] adding that they "shared a crazy time together that was totally unique to [them]" and that Anderson would hold a special place in [her] heart. Following Anderson's death, More said that a second series of Slag Wars had been in development. Between January 2024 and August 2025, More co-hosted a podcast alongside Matt Finch titled Growth Fridays, during which she discussed coping with grief after Anderson's death.

In September 2024, More returned to front a second series of Slag Wars: The Next Destroyer. The series had begun production the previous year, with More having been set to reunite with Anderson on the show, alongside Matthew Camp. However Anderson was unable to commit to the series due to health issues. More therefore co-hosted alongside Camp and drag performer Fantasia Royale Gaga. The first episode featured a tribute to Anderson, who had died the year prior. In April 2026, More began front a new podcast titled More Than Fridays. In May 2026, three years after retiring from mainstream pornography, More made a return to Brazzers, in a scene alongside Keiran Lee titled The Final Cum-Down. More also has a YouTube channel, to which she uploads vlogs of her life and activities, including a project which involved her creating a memorial garden for Anderson.

== In popular culture ==
Audio clips of More and Anderson were featured on the King Princess remix "cock destroyer", released on 4 March 2019 through SoundCloud. During a girl group challenge on the first series of RuPaul's Drag Race UK, drag queens Baga Chipz, Blu Hydrangea and Divina de Campo named themselves the "Frock Destroyers" after More and Anderson's meme. During the first season of Canada's Drag Race, contestant Ilona Verley impersonated More for the Snatch Game challenge, making her the first pornographic film actress to be impersonated in the challenge.

== Television ==
As herself
Year	Title	Role	Ref.
2020–2024	Slag Wars: The Next Destroyer	Judge	

== Podcasts ==
- Growth Fridays (2024–2025)
- More Than Fridays (2026)

== Awards and nominations ==
SHAFTA Awards
Year	Nominated work and artist	Category	Result	Ref.
2012	—N/a	MILF of the Year	Nominated	
2012	Lara's Anal Adventures Episode #1	Best Anal Scene (with Lara Latex and Kris Vicious)	Nominated	
2016	Gobblecocks	Best Sex Scene (with Iain Tate)	Won	
2016	—N/a	MILF of the Year	Won	
2018	—N/a	MILF of the Year	Won	
2018	Hard BreXXXit	Best Scene	Nominated	

Paul Raymond Awards
Year	Nominated work and artist	Category	Result	Ref.
2014	—N/a	MILF of the Year	Won	
2015	—N/a	MILF of the Year	Won	
2016	—N/a	MILF of the Year	Won	

XBIZ Europa Awards
Year	Nominated work and artist	Category	Result	Ref.
2018	Malice Before Daylight	Best Sex Scene – Glamcore	Nominated	
