= Sophie Anderson (actress) =

English pornographic actress (1987–2023)

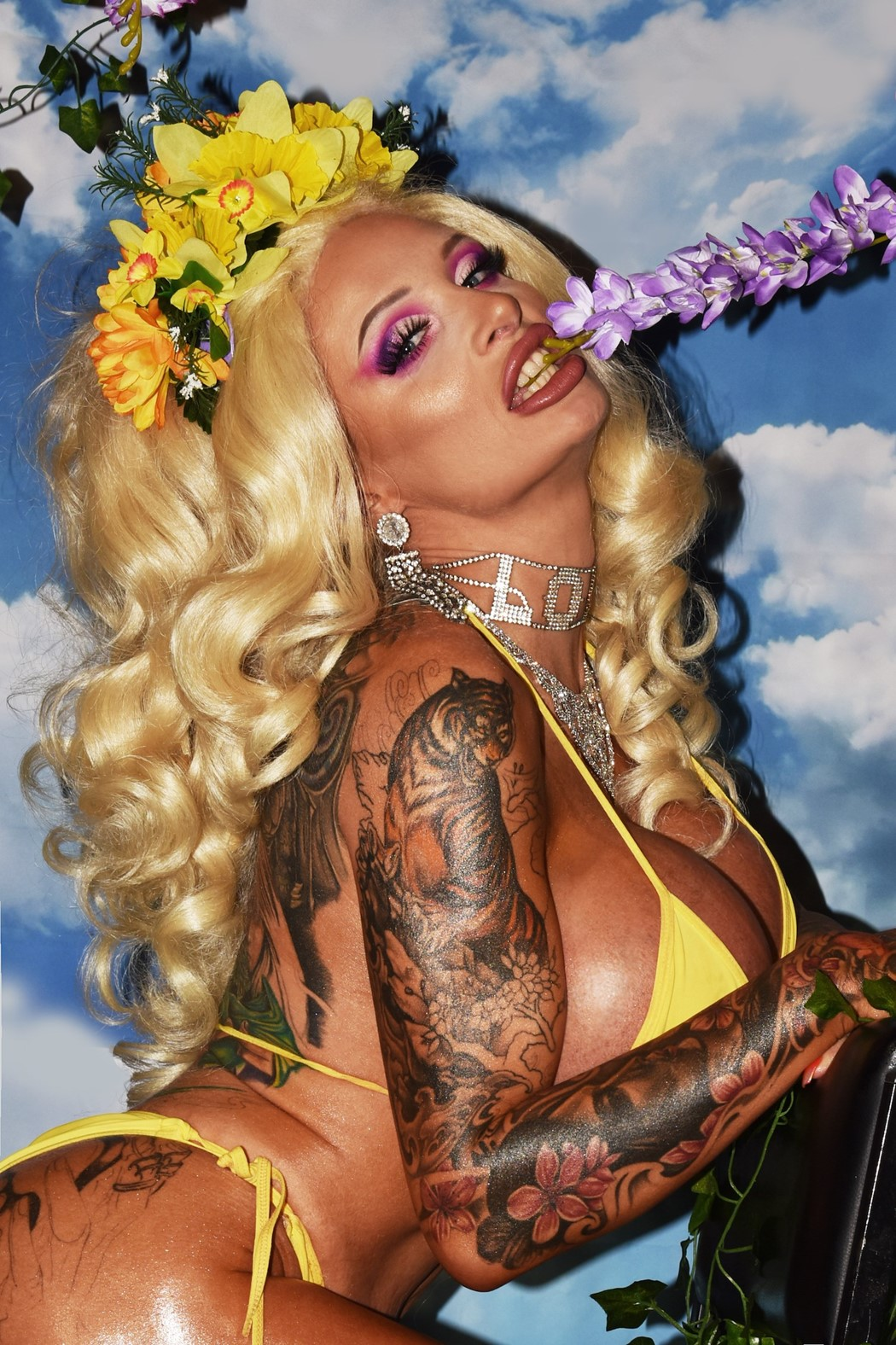
- Anderson in 2019
- Born: Karen Anne Cook; 23 November 1987; Bristol, England
- Died: 30 November 2023 (aged 36); Basingstoke, England
- Cause of death: Suicide
- Education: Bath College
- Occupations: Pornographic actress; internet personality
- Years active: 2017–2023
- Television: Slag Wars: The Next Destroyer (2020); Fucking Smart (2022–2023)
- Children: 1
- Sophie Anderson's voice Anderson on body shaming Recorded 17 July 2022

Karen Anne Cook (23 November 1987 – 30 November 2023), known professionally as Sophie Anderson, was an English pornographic actress and internet personality. She began appearing in pornographic films for such studios as Fake Taxi and Evil Angel in 2017, later finding internet fame in October 2018 when she and fellow porn star Rebecca More, who branded themselves "The Cock Destroyers", posted a video that went viral. Both her and More's videos became internet memes and the pair were subsequently regarded as "gay icons" within the LGBTQ+ community, which saw them go on to front the Men.com series Slag Wars: The Next Destroyer (2020). Anderson appeared on various podcasts discussing her life and also served as a team captain on the Canadian OutTV sex education quiz show Fucking Smart (2022–2023).

== Early life ==
Sophie Anderson was born Karen Anne Cook in Bristol, England, on 23 November 1987. Her mother walked out on the family when she was five, and Anderson and her younger sister were raised by their father Paul. Her family moved to Bradford-on-Avon and she lost her virginity to a neighbour at the age of 10. Around the same time, she began being sexually abused, knowing she could perform fellatio on men at local pubs in exchange for alcohol and drugs. Anderson described her mother as being "in and out of [her] life". She later gained parental access and Anderson and her sister would visit her on weekends; however, she was emotionally abusive and would purposely buy Anderson clothes that were too small to ridicule her about her weight, which caused her to develop anorexia, as well as being forced to watch her mother having sex with various men, who in turn began to molest her. Despite her upbringing, Anderson said she felt guilty for not reconnecting with her mother after she died from cancer. Whilst underage, she also worked in a massage parlour. She took an interest in musical theatre at school and achieved A grades in her GCSEs for performing arts. She went on to enroll in Bath College, and attended Bath Light Operatic Group as well as various auditions, including one for The X Factor.

== Career ==
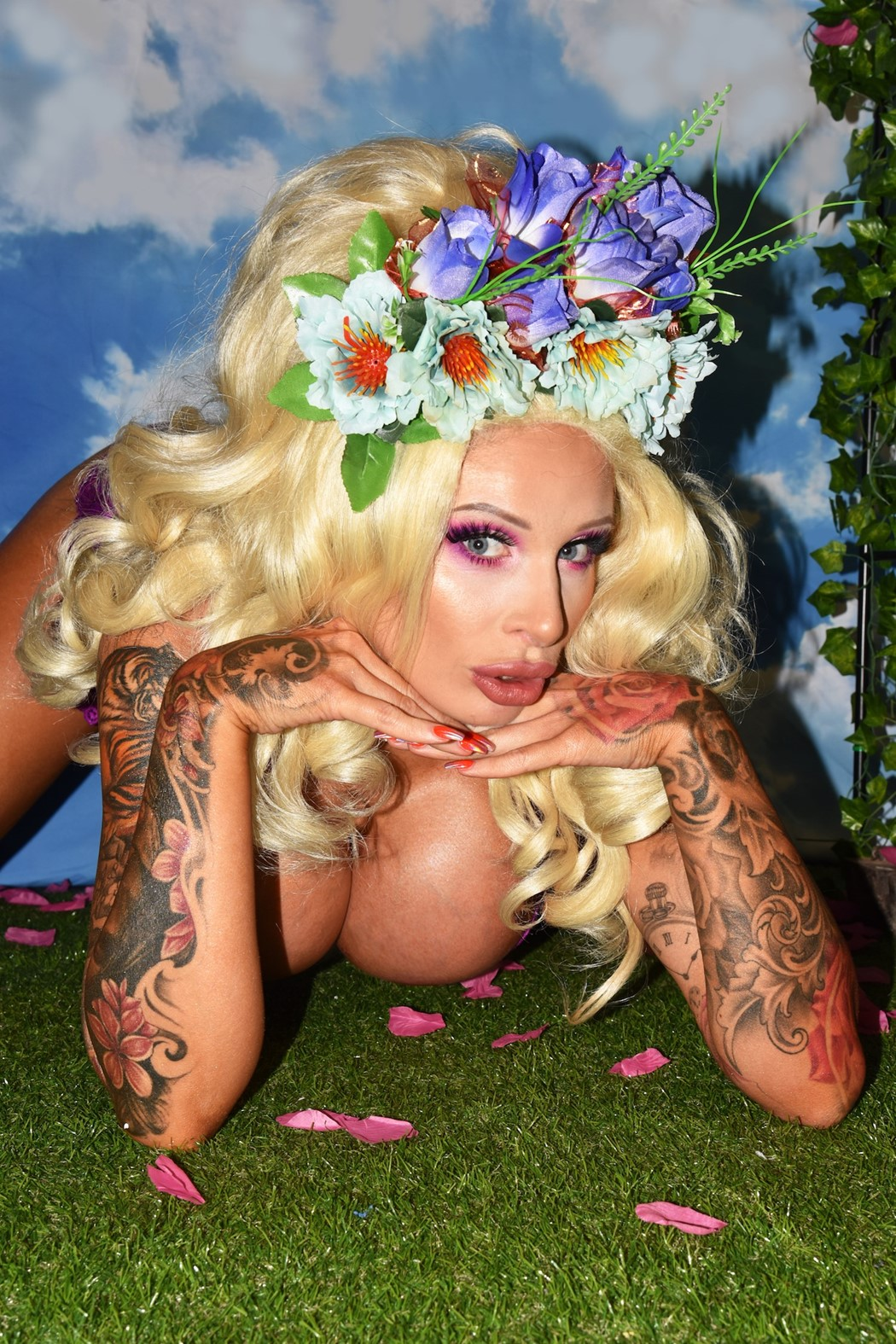
Anderson posing during a photoshoot for Dazed magazine in August 2019

Anderson began working as an escort when she was a teenager, and claimed in September 2022 to have slept with around 80,000 people during her life to that point; which included group sex. She began performing in pornographic films in 2017, appearing in three lesbian scenes for Fake Taxi. She went on to appear in a scene for Reality Kings with Jordi El Niño Polla titled "Air Jordi" and a cuckold-themed video for Brazzers, as well as scenes for other studios including DDF Network, Wicked Pictures and Evil Angel which included anal, double penetration, gangbangs and bukkake. She also discussed her porn series with Television X on Calum McSwiggan's podcast. She also had her own OnlyFans page, where she posted videos and had a joint page "F**king Explorers" alongside her partner Oliver Spedding.

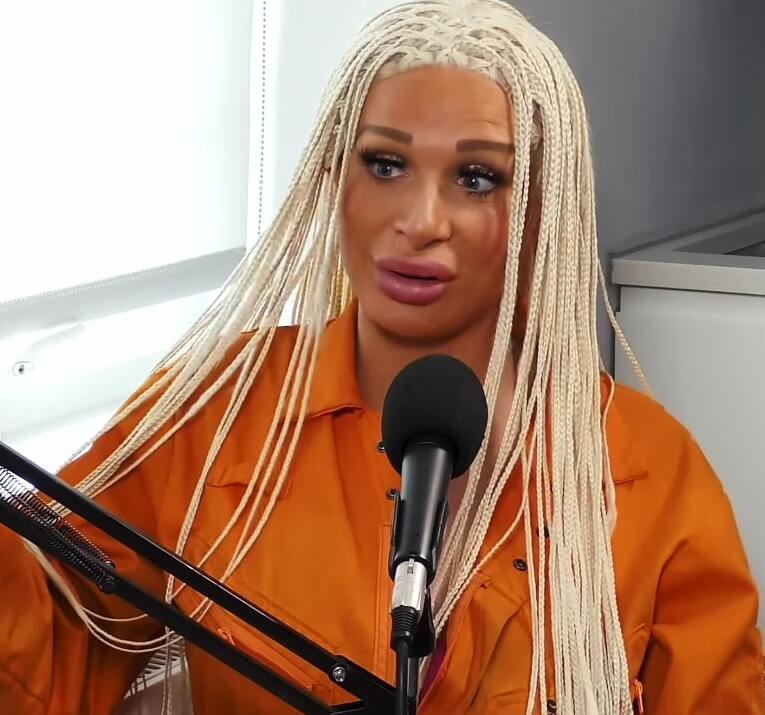
Anderson during an interview for the Anything Goes with James English podcast in July 2022

Anderson gained internet fame in October 2018 after a video of her and fellow pornographic actress Rebecca More promoting a gangbang by calling themselves "The Cock Destroyers" went viral. She frequently posted videos on social media of her improvisational and often explicit songs she wrote during everyday life. One of which, "Driving for Dick" was remixed and released as Anderson's debut single as a recording artist in August 2019, as well as an acoustic version. In October 2019, Anderson and More, featured in a non-sex role in A Tale Of Two Cock Destroyers, a gay pornographic film for Men.com which starred actors Jonas Jackson, JJ Knight, Leander, Joey Mills, Ty Mitchell and Johnny Rapid. In 2020, Anderson and More along with gay porn actor Matthew Camp began presenting the reality television competition Slag Wars: The Next Destroyer, an original series for Men.com. The premise of the show followed their quest to discover which of the seven contestants would be named "The Next Cock Destroyer". In May 2021, Anderson announced on Twitter that she and More were parting ways, resulting in an indefinite hiatus of the Cock Destroyers. Between 2022 and 2023, she appeared on the sex education quiz show Fucking Smart alongside Willam Belli and various other drag queens and guests. She also appeared on various podcasts discussing her life and career in pornography including The Fellas and Anything Goes with James English.

== In popular culture ==
Audio clips of Anderson and More were featured on the King Princess remix "cock destroyer", released on 4 March 2019 through SoundCloud. For the girl group challenge on the first series of RuPaul's Drag Race UK, drag queens Baga Chipz, Blu Hydrangea and Divina de Campo named themselves the "Frock Destroyers" after Anderson and More. In the second season of Drag Race Holland, contestant Keta Minaj impersonated Anderson for the Snatch Game challenge.

== Personal life ==
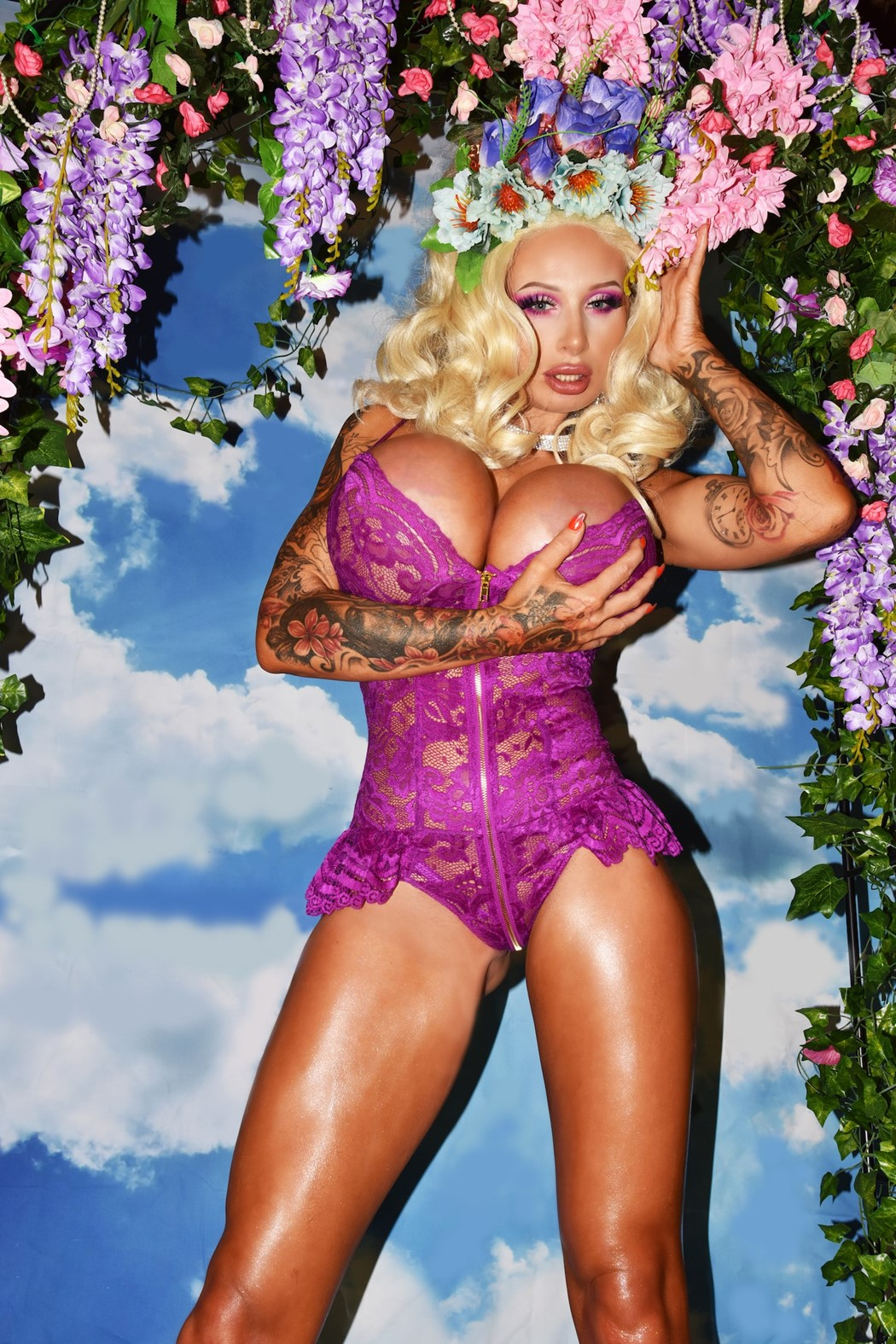
Anderson was known for her extreme body modification and enhanced breasts.

Anderson was a member and an advocate of the LGBTQ+ community, as she herself was openly pansexual. She also had a son, and prior to his birth struggled with cocaine addiction after being introduced to the drug by a former boyfriend, which Anderson said she was determined to give up after falling pregnant whilst living in a drug house.

In the 2019 United Kingdom general election, Anderson publicly stated that she voted for the Labour Party.

She was known for her extreme body modification, including lip fillers and 32J breasts. In March 2022, she was hospitalised after her left breast implant became infected with sepsis five times and ultimately exploded. She opened a GoFundMe to pay for her reconstruction surgery and raised over £10,000. She had the breast reconstructed; however, it became infected again. Anderson posted various updates on her condition after it began leaking. She had further breast reconstruction surgeries the following year.

In 2021, Anderson began a relationship with Oliver Spedding, a former footballer turned pornographic actor who had three children. On 10 September 2023, Spedding posted numerous statements on Twitter suggesting that Anderson had died. Later that day, Rebecca More announced that she had been in contact with Suffolk Police, who had carried out a welfare check on Anderson, confirming that the statements made by Spedding were false and that news of Anderson's death had been a hoax. Spedding was arrested the following day on suspicion of causing grievous bodily harm with intent, false imprisonment and sending obscene messages. Further concerns for Anderson's welfare were reported to Thames Valley Police over the following month, which alleged that Spedding was abusive as well as accusations that he had "stabbed and sex trafficked" Anderson. Spedding died on 15 November 2023, aged 34 at a Days Inn hotel in Winchester. Spedding and Anderson had taken an overdose of the drug gamma-hydroxybutyric acid (GHB) and concluded the former had died by misadventure. Anderson had called the emergency services prior to the former's death before she was discovered unconscious and after being assessed by a mental health professional, was discharged three days later into the care of her father, despite concerns from her sister that she could be a suicide risk.

=== Death ===
Anderson was found dead in a Travelodge hotel in Basingstoke on 30 November 2023, at the age of 36, two weeks after the death of Spedding. An inquest the following year ruled her death as a suicide by GHB overdose, with a post-mortem examination concluding she had taken a quantity of the drug which was ten times the strength of a fatal dose. A notebook containing letters addressed to her family and to Spedding was found at the scene of her death. Her death was announced on 4 December by Rebecca More in a statement on Instagram. More paid tribute to Anderson, describing her as a "bubbly, funny, kind hearted soul who was outrageous on the outside but also so gentle behind closed doors" [...] adding that they "shared a crazy time together that was totally unique to [them]" and that Anderson would hold a special place in [her] heart. Several members of the LGBTQ+ community also paid tribute to Anderson, including RuPaul's Drag Race UK finalist Divina de Campo who memorialised her as "outrageous [...] but incredibly sweet" and a "continuous advocate for those in the LGBTQ+ community and [the pornography] industry, as well Terrence Higgins Trust, a HIV and sexual health charity that Anderson had advocated for in the past; who said they were "so sad to hear of her death". Brazzers described Anderson as an "icon who brought so much joy to so many", whilst Men.com said she was an "ultimate ray of light [...] who embodied the kind of liberation and generosity towards oneself that [everyone] should aspire to."

== Filmography ==
As herself
Year	Title	Role	Ref.
2020	Slag Wars: The Next Destroyer	Judge; 4 episodes	
2022–2023	Fucking Smart	Team captain	

== Podcasts ==
As interviewee
Year	Title	Ref.
2019	FUBAR Radio with Calum McSwiggan	
2022	The Fellas	
2022	Anything Goes with James English	

== Discography ==
=== Singles ===
Title	Year	Peak chart position	Album
"Driving for Dick"	2019	Did not chart	Non-album single
"Driving for Dick" (Acoustic)	2019	Did not chart	Non-album single
