= Bayli (singer) =

American singer

BAYLI
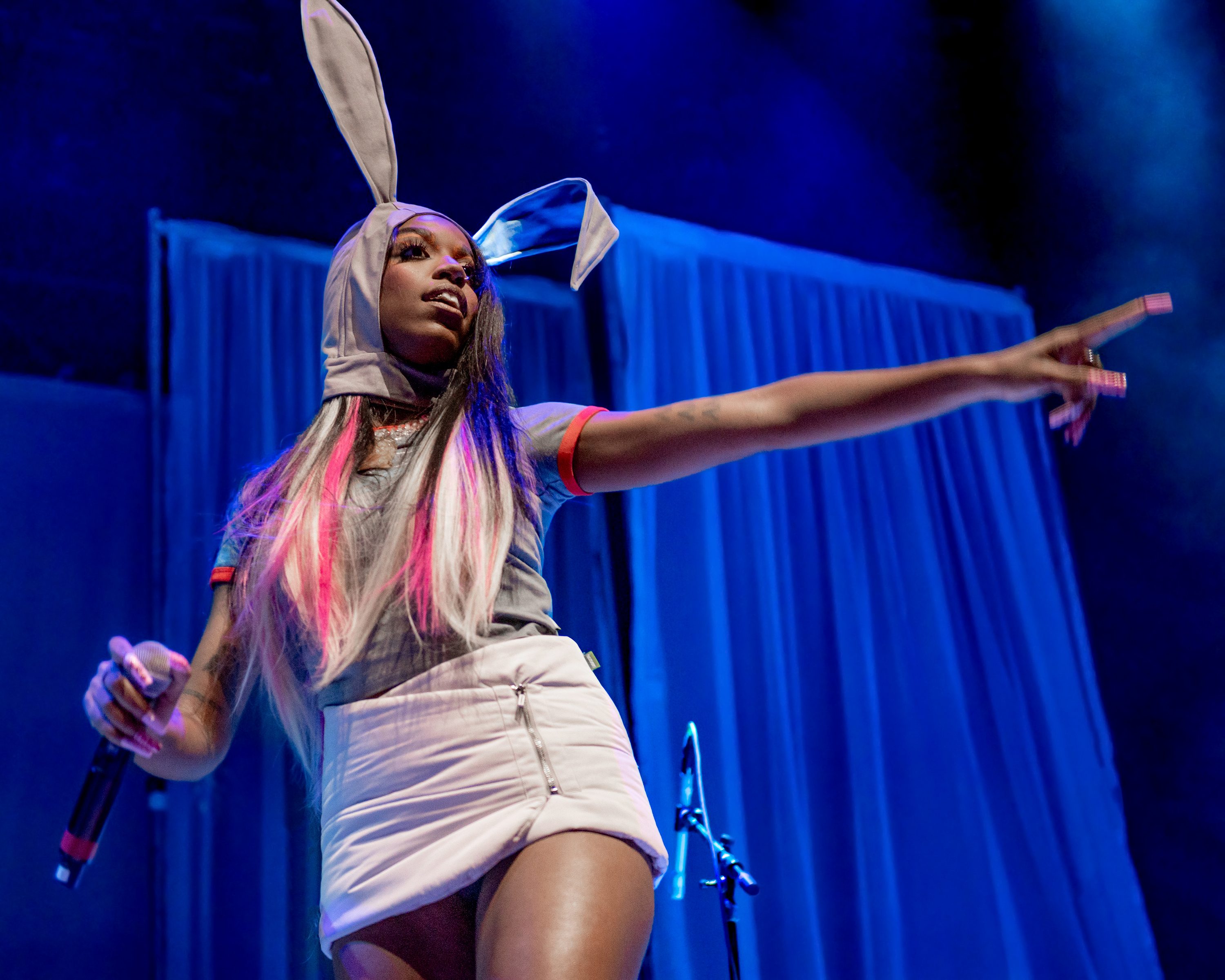
- Bayli performing in 2023

Background information
- Born: Bayli Mckeithan
- Occupations: Singer; songwriter; rapper; DJ
- Years active: 2018–present
- Website: www.baylimusic.com
- Musical career
- Origin: Hell's Kitchen, New York, U.S.
- Genres: R&B; Pop; Pop-Rap
- Instruments: Vocals; Guitar
- Labels: Warner Chappell Music; +1records
- Formerly of: The Skins

Bayli Mckeithan, known professionally as Bayli (stylized as BAYLI), is an American singer. Raised in Brooklyn, New York, she first gained recognition as part of the band The Skins, with which she released one EP and several singles. Following the group's hiatus in 2018, she began her solo career under a mononym.

== Career ==
=== The Skins ===
Bayli was the lead vocalist of Brooklyn-based rock band The Skins, which she formed as a teenager with her siblings Reef (drummer) and Kaya (bassist and vocalist), as well as with friends Russel Chell and Daisy Spencer (guitarists). The band was signed by Rick Rubin and released an EP, Still Sleep. The Skins went on tour with DNCE.

Rolling Stone named The Skins as one of their top ten new artists to know in 2016.

In 2018, The Skins went on hiatus after leaving their label; they eventually decided to disband amicably.

=== Solo career ===
Bayli released her solo debut single, "MYOB: Or Whatever", in 2018. The song was co-written with Justin Tranter. She subsequently released R&B single "Underneath", which featured on her mixtape Summer.

In 2020, Bayli released singles "sushi for breakfast", "boys lie", and "clown shit".

Bayli released the single "16" in 2021. The song describes her mother's life story, as well as her ambition and influence on Bayli; it was reworked into a memorial song after her unexpected death. It and previous singles were included in her debut EP, Stories from New York, which also released in 2021. Bayli said the EP's concept came after making songs for the project, when she noticed they all had a common thread relating to her New York City background, stating that "with all the ways the city has influenced my identity with music and art and fashion and even my family's identity too, it just felt so right." The EP also embodies her desire to share stories from a new perspective: "As a Black woman, as a queer person, as a person at the intersection of all these things, I would love to be there to tell new stories. That’s what Stories from New York is."

In 2022, Bayli received recognition for her single "Telly Bag", an ode to her love of the Telfar bag. The Fader featured the single as a "Song You Need". The Fader and Paper magazine praised "Telly Bag" for its "effortless breeziness" and "laidback vibes." Reviewers noted "Telly Bag"'s explicit queerness and connection to queer culture, with BroadwayWorld describing it as a "gay anthem."

Bayli released a second EP, Stories 2, in October 2022. Following its release, she went on tour with Magdalena Bay. Metro Weekly spotlighted Bayli as an Editor's Pick musician in 2022.

In 2025, Bayli announced a new era featuring more EDM-focused pop. Her EP No Re-Entry released on November 11, 2025. The album features collaborations with Cortisa Star, Fetish, and Kevin Aviance.

=== Collaborations ===
Bayli has had several official remixes for her singles: "sushi for breakfast" with Junglepussy, "boys lie" with SEBii, and "clown shit" with Sophie.

Bayli collaborated with Gia Woods on the single "Spend It".

== Personal life ==
Bayli has stated she does not have a specific label she uses in terms of her sexuality, but she does identify as queer and gay.

== Influences ==
Bayli has cited The Miseducation of Lauryn Hill as a musical influence.

== Tours ==
Headlining

- Stories from New York show (Mercury Lounge) (2021)
- Stories from New York LIVE! show (Elsewhere) (2023)
- CODE PINK show (The Peppermint Club) (2023)

Supporting

- Mercurial US Tour (Magdalena Bay) (2022)
- Club Valentine US Tour (Slayyyter) (2023)
- Exhibitionism On Tour (Rebecca Black) (2026)

Special guest

- Spring Tour (Shygirl) (2022)
- I MISS U Tour (KYLE) (2022)
- Coachella Music Festival (Mura Masa & Channel Tres) (2023)
- Club Shy (Shygirl) (2024)

== Performances ==
- Heav3n Party (1720 Warehouse) (2021)
- Heav3n NY Debut Show (3 Dollar Bill) (2022)
- Heav3n Party (1720 Warehouse) (2022)
- Sinderella Queer Ball (3 Dollar Bill) (2022)
- Sunset Social (Urban Justice Center) (2023)
- The Bentway Block Party (The Bentway) (2023)
- Boiler Room DC (Boiler Room) (2023)
- Heav3n Party (1720 Warehouse) (2023)
- NYFW Party (Jean's) (2024)
- NYC PrideFest (NYC Pride) (2024)
- Simple Life Festival (Shanghai International Circuit) (2024)
- A NIGHT WITH Sophie tribute show by Heav3n (1720 Warehouse) (2024)

== Discography ==
BAYLI discography
- EPs: 3
- Singles: 14
- Featured singles: 15
- Promotional singles: 2

=== Extended plays ===
Year	Title	EP details
2021	Stories from New York	Release: September 10, 2021; Label: Snafu; Format: Digital download, streaming
2022	Stories 2	Release: October 21, 2022; Format: Digital download, streaming
2023	Both (Remix Pack)	Release: November 10, 2023; Features: Sophie Gray, DLMT, & Angelus; Format: Digital download, streaming
2025	No Re-Entry	Release: November 10, 2025; Label: +1; Format: Digital download, streaming

=== Singles ===
Title	Year	Album
"Sushi for Breakfast"	2020	Stories from New York
"Sushi for Breakfast (Sped Up)"	2020	Non-album single
"sushi for breakfast (Remix)" (featuring Junglepussy)	2020	Non-album single
"Not Safe"	2020	Stories from New York
"Boys Lie"	2020	Stories from New York
"Boys Lie (Remix)" (featuring Sebii)	2020	Non-album single
"Not Safe (Acoustic)"	2021	Non-album single
"Sick!" (featuring iLoveMakonnen)	2021	Non-album single
"16"	2021	Stories from New York
"Telly Bag"	2022	Stories 2
"Think of Drugs"	2022	Stories 2
"Act Up"	2022	Stories 2
"BOTH" (featuring Sophie Gray)	2023	Non-album single
"SUGARCOAT"	2025	Non-album single
"Monster" (featuring Banoffee)	2026	No Re-Entry: Nano Mixes

=== As a featuring artist ===
Song	Year	Album
"Best I've Ever Had" DLMT & Vinne (featuring Bayli)	2019	Non-album single
"Find A Way" Duckwrth (featuring Alex Mali, Radio Ahlee & Bayli)	2020	SuperGood
"Clown Shit" Babynymph & Bayli	2020	Non-album single
"clown shit (up the wall) [Sophie Remix]" Babynymph, Bayli & Sophie	2020	Non-album single
"Busy (Bayli Remix)" Nina Las Vegas & Bayli	2021	Non-album single
"Mind Games" DAGR, Bayli, LYAM & HANABII	2022	Fade on Back
"Spend It" Gia Woods & Bayli	2022	Heartbreak County, Vol. 2
"demon time" Mura Masa & Bayli	2022	demon time
"Superstar" That Kid & Bayli	2022	Superstar
"Enter the Chat" Sonikku featuring Bayli	2023	Whirlwind of Malevolence
"Kissing Practise" Kai Whiston & Bayli	2023	Quiet As Kept, F.O.G. (Extended Cut)
"PURPLE APE" CONNIE & Bayli	2023	Hi_TEK MZK, Vol. 1
"Ethical Plum" Chaos Chaos featuring Bayli	2024	Non-album single
"Catch Me [Glimji's Illusion]" twst featuring Bayli & MEYY	2024	TWST0002 (Upgraded)
"Tsunami" Little Sis Nora (featuring Bayli)	2025	Eurotrash

=== Promotional singles ===
Title	Year	Album
"howlin' 404 (Bayli cover)" DEAN	2020	Non-album promotional singles
"sushi for breakfast (Live Orchestral Symphony)"	2020	Non-album promotional singles

=== Other appearances ===
Title	Year	Album
"Jingle Bells"	2020	Happiest Season (Music from and Inspired by the Film) [Deluxe Version]

=== Music videos ===
Title	Year	Album	Director(s)	Remarks
"sushi for breakfast (official visualizer)"	2020	Stories from New York	Tawfick; Matt Lucier; Justin Miller	—N/a
"clown shit / (up the wall) (Sophie remix) (official visualizer)"	2020	—N/a		Contains both "Clown Shit" (Babynymph) and "clown shit (up the wall) [Sophie Remix] singles.
"not safe"	2020	Stories from New York	Justin Miller	—N/a
"not safe (acoustic)"	2021	—N/a	HowRU? Ent.	—N/a
"SICK!"	2021	—N/a	Justin Miller	—N/a
"16"	2021	Stories from New York	Joshua Medina	—N/a
"foreigner"	2021	Stories from New York	Joshua Medina	—N/a
"Telly Bag"	2022	Stories 2	Quinn Blackburn; Justin Miller	—N/a
"act up"	2022	Stories 2	Alex Gayoso	—N/a
"pressure"	2022	Stories 2	Quinn Blackburn	—N/a
"BOTH (official visualizer)"	2023	—N/a		Features Sophie gray.
