= Slag Wars: The Next Destroyer =

2020 reality television competition series

- Promotional poster for the first series
- Genre: Reality
- Judges: Rebecca More; Sophie Anderson; Matthew Camp; Fantasia Royale Gaga
- Narrated by: Chase Icon
- Theme music composer: Andrew Barret Cox
- Opening theme: "Slag Wars"
- Composer: Andrew Barret Cox
- Country of origin: United Kingdom
- Original language: English
- No. of seasons: 2
- No. of episodes: 11

Original release
- Release: 27 November 2020 – present

Slag Wars: The Next Destroyer is a British reality television competition series that premiered online on 27 November 2020. The show features Rebecca More and Matthew Camp and either Sophie Anderson or Fantasia Royale Gaga on their hunt to discover the next LGBTQ+ icon. The first series, broadcast in 2020 on Men.com and SlagWars.com, lasted four episodes. The second series was delayed by Anderson and More splitting up and was not produced until 2023. Anderson died in November 2023; the first episode of the second series, broadcast in September 2024, was dedicated to Anderson and aired alongside a documentary about the Cock Destroyers.

== Synopsis ==
"ASMR sex chat. A slag eating a banana during a confessional in a way that one could only reasonably describe as 'menacingly erotic'. Bondage. Latex. Kinks. Fetishes. Two slags going at each other's necks like vampires. Someone getting lightly slapped while wearing a collar and being gagged by a Granny Smith. It really is fun for all the family."

— Ben Charlie Smoke of Vice describing the show in November 2020

The show was intended as a celebration of sex work and as a safe space for people to be themselves. Contestants were described on the programme as "slags", a term in British English equivalent to slut, in order to reclaim the word as sex-positive. The programme's confessionals were annotated with both names and pronouns. Each episode features a foreplay and a passion challenge, each of which explores a facet of the sex industry. One challenge featured contestants trying to steal payment card numbers during ASMR sex talk sessions and another featured rope bondage. The series also featured conversations about tokenism, fetishism, racism, violence against transgender people, and sexual consent.

== Production ==
=== Season one ===
Slag Wars was conceived several years before broadcast by Sophie Anderson and Rebecca More, who had become famous as two halves of The Cock Destroyers. The show used the working title "Slag Wars: Finding the Next Cock Destroyer" but was later bowdlerised. The show was produced over four days after a friend of More offered her large countryside house for a shoot. Contestants on the show comprised seven sex workers and OnlyFans creators including Nicky Monet, a transgender woman; Tyler, a Black non-binary person; and five contestants who used "he/him" pronouns. Four contestants were from England, with one each from Scotland, Mexico, and the United States. Camp and the programme's non-UK slags had to quarantine for two weeks before filming, as the show was filmed during the COVID-19 pandemic in the United Kingdom.

The series was produced by the queer production company DaddyTV on a tight budget and ran for four episodes. Anderson was due to have buttock augmentation just before filming, but delayed it as she felt it would interfere with wearing the lycra suits they had ordered for the show. The series was co-presented by Matthew Camp and used many personal friends of the Cock Destroyers as guests including its narrator Chase Icon. The soundtrack comprised specially composed tracks by Andrew Barret Cox. The show was announced in October 2020 by AVN and marketed on its inclusivity. The series was streamed on Men.com and SlagWars.com, the latter of which had been created for those wanting a safe for work experience. Tyler won the series.

=== Season two ===
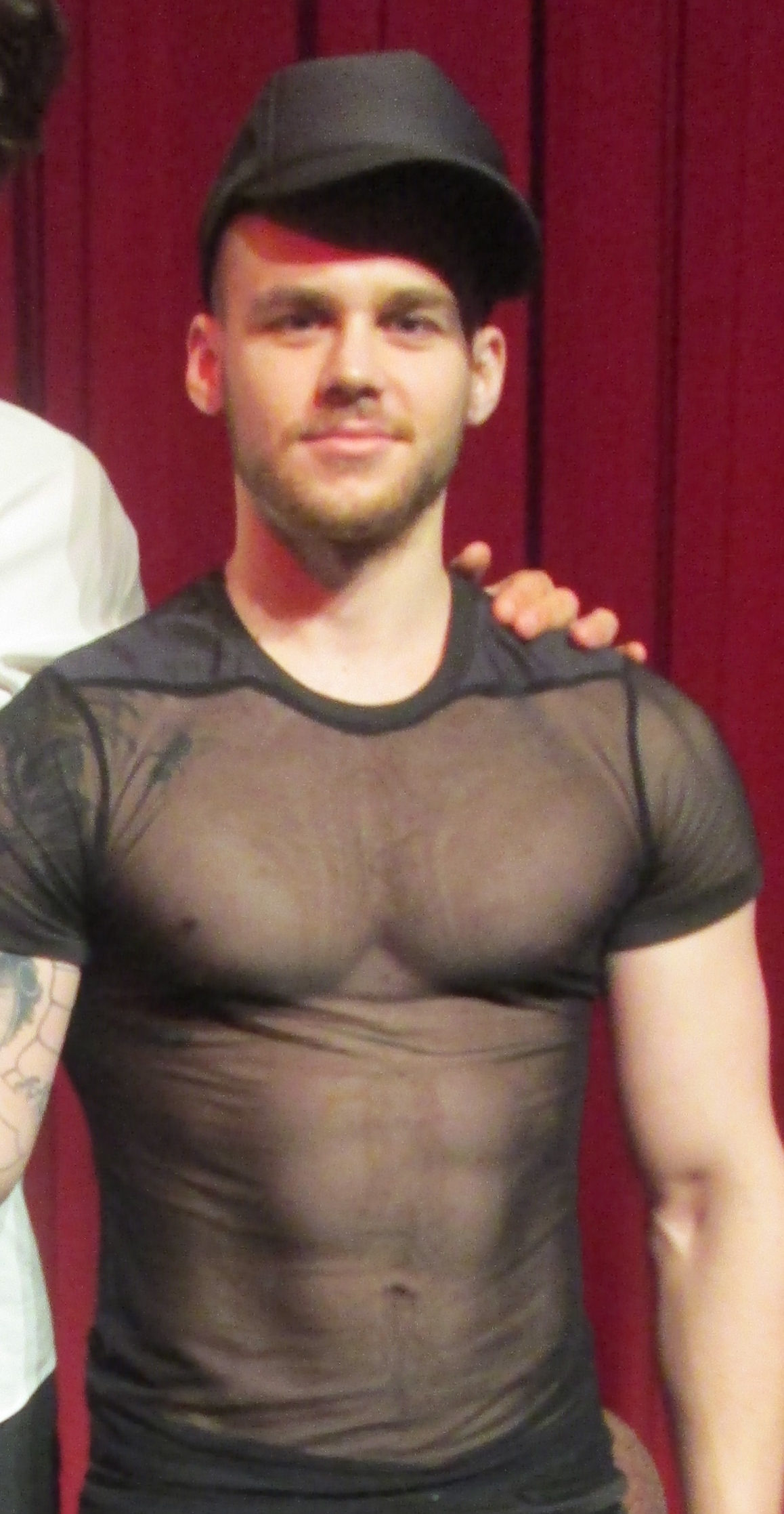
Matthew Camp in 2012

In May 2021, More announced that the pair had split up following her receipt of a "viscous email" [sic]; the following month, DaddyTV announced Hot Haus, a show judged by Camp and Monet and won by Fantasia Royale Gaga. More kept abreast of Anderson's life after the breakup and the pair later reconciled. In late 2023, a second series of Slag Wars was produced and was due to be hosted by More, Anderson, and Camp, but Anderson dropped out after no-showing on the first day of production as she was not well enough to film and was replaced by Royale Gaga. Cain, one of the slags from the first series, returned as a producer and casting director, having previously worked with some of the slags he cast including Mama Mamba and Cocoa Kink. This series featured the same theme song as the first series.

Originally, the slags were supposed to be in teams, with Anderson and More having four slags each. Anderson's illness meant that this was aborted and replaced by a points-based system, with eliminations removed; the first episode featured Royale Gaga giving a distracted More a pep talk. In November 2023, shortly after filming, Anderson died; More announced her death in December 2023. The second series aired on the LGBTQ streaming service Outflix and ran for seven episodes; its first episode featured a tribute to Anderson and was released alongside a documentary on how the Cock Destroyers became famous. Mama Mamba won the series.

== Cast ==
- Rebecca More (2020–present)
- Sophie Anderson (2020)
- Matthew Camp (2020–present)
- Fantasia Royale Gaga (2024–present)

== Series 1 (2020) ==
=== Contestants ===
Contestants of Slag Wars
Contestant	Pronouns	Age	Hometown	Outcome
Tyler	They/Them	20	London, England	Winner
Cain	He/Him	25	London, England	Runners-up
Cameron Smith	He/Him	26	Manchester, England	Runners-up
Nicky Monet	She/Her	—	Los Angeles, California	Runners-up
Gustavo Ernesto Escobedo	He/Him	30	Mexico	5th place
Kevin Scott	He/Him	25	Aberdeen, Scotland	6th Place
Levi Jed Murphy	He/Him	24	Manchester, England	7th Place

=== Contestant progress ===
Contestant	1	2	3	4
Tyler	BTM2	SAFE	WIN	Winner
Cain	WIN	BTM2	SAFE	Runner-up
Cameron	SAFE	SAFE	ELIM	Runner-up
Nicky	SAFE	WIN	SAFE	Runner-up
Gustavo	WIN	WIN	ELIM	
Kevin	SAFE	ELIM		
Levi	BTM2	QUIT		

The contestant won Slag Wars.
The contestant was a runner-up.
The contestant left the competition voluntarily.
The contestant won the challenge.
The contestant was declared safe.
The contestant was in the bottom two.
The contestant was eliminated.

=== Episodes ===
Slag Wars episodes
No.	Title	Original Air Date	Guests
1	Slag On Arrival	27 November 2020	Matt Lambert and Chris Crocker
2	Safe Word Slag	4 December 2020	Sam Morris, Busty Cookie and Emily Balfour
3	Show Biz Slags	11 December 2020	Baga Chipz
4	Last Slag Standing	18 December 2020	—

== Series 2 (2024) ==
=== Contestants ===
Contestants of Slag Wars 2
Contestant	Pronouns	Hometown	Outcome
Mama Mamba	She/Her	wellingborough, UK	Winner
Cocoa Kink	She/Her	London, England	Runners-up
Freyja Phoria	She/They	East London	Runners-up
Damien Lenore	He/Him	Miami, Florida	4th place
Braxton Cruz	He/Him	Australia	5th place
JV Marx	He/Him	Los Angeles, California	5th place
Oscar (Hotboiyo)	He/Him	London, UK	5th place
Sabrina Jade	She/They	Brighton, UK	5th place

=== Contestant progress ===
Contestant	2	3	4	5	6		7
Mama	WIN	SAFE	WIN	SAFE	SAFE	ADV	Winner
Cocoa	SAFE	SAFE	SAFE	SAFE	WIN	ADV	Runner-up
Freyja	SAFE	WIN	SAFE	SAFE	SAFE	ADV	Runner-up
Damien	SAFE	WIN	SAFE	SAFE	SAFE	ADV	QUIT
Braxton	SAFE	SAFE	SAFE	SAFE	SAFE	ELIM	Guest
JV	WIN	SAFE	WIN	SAFE	SAFE	ELIM	Guest
Oscar	SAFE	SAFE	SAFE	WIN	SAFE	ELIM	Guest
Sabrina	SAFE	SAFE	WIN	WIN	SAFE	ELIM	Guest

The contestant won Slag Wars.
The contestant was a runner-up.
The contestant advanced to the final four.
The contestant won the passion project challenge.
The contestant won the foreplay challenge.
The contestant was declared safe.
The contestant was in the bottom two.
The contestant was eliminated.
The contestant left the competition voluntarily.
The contestant returned as a guest.

=== Episodes ===
Slag Wars 2 episodes
No.	Title	Original Air Date	Guests
1	Despunking The World: The Slag Wars Story	17 September 2024	Joey Mills, Ricky Cornish, Lillian Stone, Jan Sport, Cara Cunningham and Nicky Monet
2	Revenge of the Slags	17 September 2024	—
3	Seasonal Slags	24 September 2024	—
4	Gold Medal Slag	1 October 2024	Cain (runner-up of Series 1)
5	Spotlight Slags	8 October 2024	Joey Mills
6	Scruff Slags	15 October 2024	Johnny Scruff
7	Finale Slags	22 October 2024	—

== Reception ==
The show became a minor cult hit. Writing between broadcast of the first and second episode, Emma Kelly of i-D described the show as "one of the most genuine representations of sex workers and queer, trans and non-binary people ever seen on TV". Reviewing the first series, Tim Forster of Vulture described the show as "good, dirty fun, with a healthy dose of camp" and complimented the show for its queer representation, though wrote that Daddy Couture was "heavily product-placed" and that having five contestants out of seven who identified as "he/him" demonstrated an "imperfect approach to diversity". Barry Pierce of Dazed wrote that the series was "a truly glorious celebration of the self with positivity and inclusivity as its central tenets" and stated that one scene, in which Anderson unsuccessfully tried to storm off set in high heels following an inability to send anybody home and ended up crawling off set, was a contender for his "television moment of the year". Writing in September 2024, Joel Medina of Collider described the show as "a raucous display of LGBTQ+ joy like viewers have never seen".
