= Nicky Monet =

Reality television personality

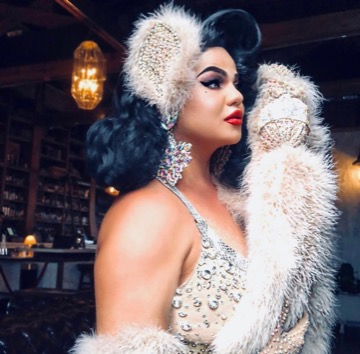
- Monet in 2022
- Occupations: Television presenter, Reality television personality & Drag performer

Nicky Monet is an American transgender television presenter, reality television personality and drag performer. She has performed in reality TV series including Slag Wars, Hot Haus, and Iconic Justice.

== Career ==
In 2021, she received international recognition when Lady Gaga read a heartfelt letter from Monet on stage, in which she confessed that Gaga's music helped her through depression.

In 2022, Playback announced that Hot Haus was picked up for a second season by Out TV, with Monet as judge alongside Matthew Camp.

Monet resides in Miami, Florida, as of 2022, where she performs regularly at Palace Bar.
