= That Kid =

American singer-songwriter (born 1999)

- Born: Spencer Joseph; January 1, 1999 (age 27); Denver, Colorado, U.S.
- Genres: Pop; hyperpop; dance
- Occupations: Singer; songwriter
- Years active: 2017–present
- Member of: Freakalicious

Spencer Joseph (born January 1, 1999), known professionally as That Kid, is an American singer, songwriter, and social media personality from Denver, Colorado. His debut single "Dial Tone" gained traction within the hyperpop subculture, a genre in which he has since become a prominent figure. Since then, he has released three mixtapes, Crush (2020), Superstar (2022), and TK Ultra (2024). His self-proclaimed debut album, So Famous, released on June 5, 2026.

== Early life ==
Spencer Joseph was born on January 1, 1999, in Denver, Colorado. Joseph began playing the cello at the age of 11, revealing an early interest in music. He began creating original music at 14 with a laptop and his father's old gaming headset, initially as a new hobby to replace his interest in art, particularly oil pastels. However, after a few months, he shifted to experimenting with singing and creating experimental R&B. Joseph pursued his passion for music and began taking singing lessons while actively participating in his school's choir.

== Career ==
=== 2017–2019: "Dial Tone" and singles collection ===
In 2017 and 2018, That Kid gained a following on the social media platform Twitter, which led to his collaboration with Slayyyter and Ayesha Erotica on his debut single, "Dial Tone", released on September 9, 2018. The single's success led to releasing the singles "80 Mph" and "Boyfriend" later that year. Some of these songs, such as "Dial Tone", were intended for "Dial Up Diaries" his shelved debut album.

In 2019, he released eight more singles and appeared on the track "E-Boy" from Slayyyter's mixtape, Slayyyter (2019).

=== 2020–2021: Crush and Comedown ===
On March 2, 2020, That Kid announced his debut mixtape Crush, which was released on March 31. In an interview with Paper, he revealed that he "wrote about 20 brand new songs for the mixtape". The mixtape includes collaborations from artists Liz, Ravenna Golden, and Tama Gucci, as well as a cover of Soulja Boy's "Kiss Me thru the Phone". The project was described as being "driven primarily by fantasy and just fun story telling", and ranked at number 11 on The Line of Best Fit's list of best hyperpop albums. On September 4, the remix album Crush: The Remixes was released.

On September 23, That Kid released the double single "Skater Boy" / "Look at Me" and held a Zoom release party with Subculture Party on September 26.

In 2021, he released the singles "Boost Mobile" featuring Terror Jr, "Mile High Club", and "Honey" with Umru.

On September 14, That Kid released "Cobra", the lead single to his first extended play, Comedown. He recorded his first official music video for it, which was released on September 16. That month, That Kid appeared on the cover of Spotify's "hyperpop" playlist. Comedown was released on October 20, which Jon Ali from Paper described as "sparkly, angsty, and angelic", and a "sister" record to Crush.

=== 2022–2024: Superstar and TK Ultra ===
On July 4, 2022, That Kid released "Full Throttle", the lead single from his second mixtape Superstar, after performing the song at HEAV3N in Los Angeles, California the previous month. The second single from the mixtape, "DRY2WET", was released on August 4.

On August 22, Superstar's cover art and tracklist were revealed, and the project was released the following month. After its release, outlets praised its maximalist production and strong collaboration choices. In an interview, That Kid said of the mixtape: "I think Superstar is sonically a lot more realized than Crush or Comedown... I just wanted it to feel very large, the whole project as whole is a bit larger than life." On December 6, he released the remix album Superstar: The Remixes.

That Kid headlined at Elsewhere in Brooklyn, New York on September 27 with Miss Madeline. He also played at the Boiler Room x Subculture event in Los Angeles on December 2. He returned to Elsewhere on January 25, 2023 to perform for Intima NYC.

On January 30, That Kid released a SoundCloud and YouTube exclusive single, "Crank That", an adaptation of Soulja Boy's 2007 single "Crank That (Soulja Boy)".

That Kid headlined at El Cid Sunset in Los Angeles on June 1 with RYL0 and FantasyLuv. He then went on to perform at Warehouse Live in Houston, Texas on August 12 with 6arelyhuman, Bayymack, and Strgurrl.

He released "Q.O.S.D" on December 6, the lead single from his third mixtape, TK Ultra, which was released in August 2024. "Tila Tequila" and "Spencer Needs a Ladder" were released as the second and third singles from the mixtape in April and July 2024, respectively.

=== 2025–present: So Famous ===
On November 14, 2025, That Kid released "Denim", the lead single from his then-unannounced debut album. The accompanying music video was released a week later on November 21.

The singles that followed afterwards, "Lip Service", "Super Hot Bitch", and "Tan Lines" would release in 2026, on January 9, February 20, and April 10 respectively. Later that month, on April 28, That Kid would release his first self-produced song on his SoundCloud page, "Devoted To You", sampling the song "Shadow" by Korean girl group f(x).

That Kid would formally announce his debut album, So Famous, on May 18, releasing a month later on June 5. The cover art was revealed along with the announcement, and the rear cover and track listing was officially revealed on June 1.

== Discography ==
=== Albums ===
Title	Details
So Famous	Released: June 5, 2026; Label: Thrive Music; Format: Digital download, streaming, vinyl

=== Mixtapes ===
Title	Details
Crush	Released: March 31, 2020; Label: Self-released; Format: Digital download, streaming, vinyl
Superstar	Released: September 22, 2022; Label: Self-released; Format: Digital download, streaming, vinyl
TK Ultra	Released: August 29, 2024; Label: Thrive Music; Format: Digital download, streaming

=== Extended plays ===
Title	Details
Comedown	Released: October 20, 2021; Label: Self-released; Format: Digital download, streaming, vinyl

=== Remix albums ===
Title	Details
Crush: The Remixes	Released: September 4, 2020; Label: Self-released; Format: Digital download, streaming
Superstar: The Remixes	Released: December 6, 2022; Label: Self-released; Format: Digital download, streaming
TK Ultra (Remixes)	Released: September 5, 2025; Label: Thrive Music; Format: Digital download, streaming

=== Singles ===
==== As lead artist ====
Year	Title	Album
2018	"Dial Tone" (featuring Slayyyter and Ayesha Erotica)	Non-album singles
2018	"80 Mph"	Non-album singles
2018	"Boyfriend"	Non-album singles
2019	"Take It Off"	Non-album singles
2019	"Arcade" (featuring Moistbreezy)	Non-album singles
2019	"Booty Call"	Non-album singles
2019	"Rocket" (featuring Holliday Howe)	Non-album singles
2019	"Penthouse"	Non-album singles
2019	"Blindfold"	Non-album singles
2019	"Mind Your Business"	Non-album singles
2019	"Fuck It Up" (featuring PRINCI, FAGedelics, Belladonna, VisaS2k, and Wifi Baby)	Non-album singles
2020	"Skater Boy" / "Look at Me"	Non-album singles
2021	"Boost Mobile" (featuring Terror Jr)	Non-album singles
2021	"Mile High Club"	Non-album singles
2021	"Honey" (with Umru)	Non-album singles
2021	"Cobra"	Comedown
2022	"Full Throttle"	Superstar
2022	"DRY2WET"	Superstar
2023	"My House" (Note: "My House" and "Best of Me" were removed from streaming services preceding the release of "Q.O.S.D")	Non-album singles
2023	"10 Bad Bitches" (with River Moon, Petal Supply, Warpstr, Umru, Iglooghost, and Chase Icon)	Non-album singles
2023	"Best of Me"	Non-album singles
2023	"Q.O.S.D"	TK Ultra
2024	"Tila Tequila"	TK Ultra
2024	"Spencer Needs a Ladder" (with 6arelyhuman)	TK Ultra
2025	"Casino" (Michael Medrano remix)	The Penthouse
2025	"Calvin Klein" (with Jane Remover)	Non-album singles
2025	"Denim"	So Famous
2026	"Lip Service"	So Famous
2026	"Super Hot Bitch"	So Famous
2026	"Tan Lines"	So Famous

==== As featured artist ====
Year	Title	Album
2018	"Sweat" (WAVVY FROG featuring That Kid)	Non-album singles
2018	"Regina George" (Kyunchi featuring That Kid and Ayesha Erotica)	Non-album singles
2019	"Cavity" (Jake Germain featuring That Kid)	Non-album singles
2019	"ICU" (Gameboi featuring That Kid)	Gameboi
2023	"Currency" (6arelyhuman featuring That Kid)	Non-album singles
2023	"Cherry" (Princess Ketamine featuring Diana Starshine and That Kid)	Non-album singles

==== SoundCloud releases ====
Title	Year
"Crank That"	2023
"Devoted To You"	2026

== Tours ==
=== Supporting ===
- 6arelyhuman - The Sassy Scene Tour (2024)
