= Gia Woods =

American pop musician (born 1996)

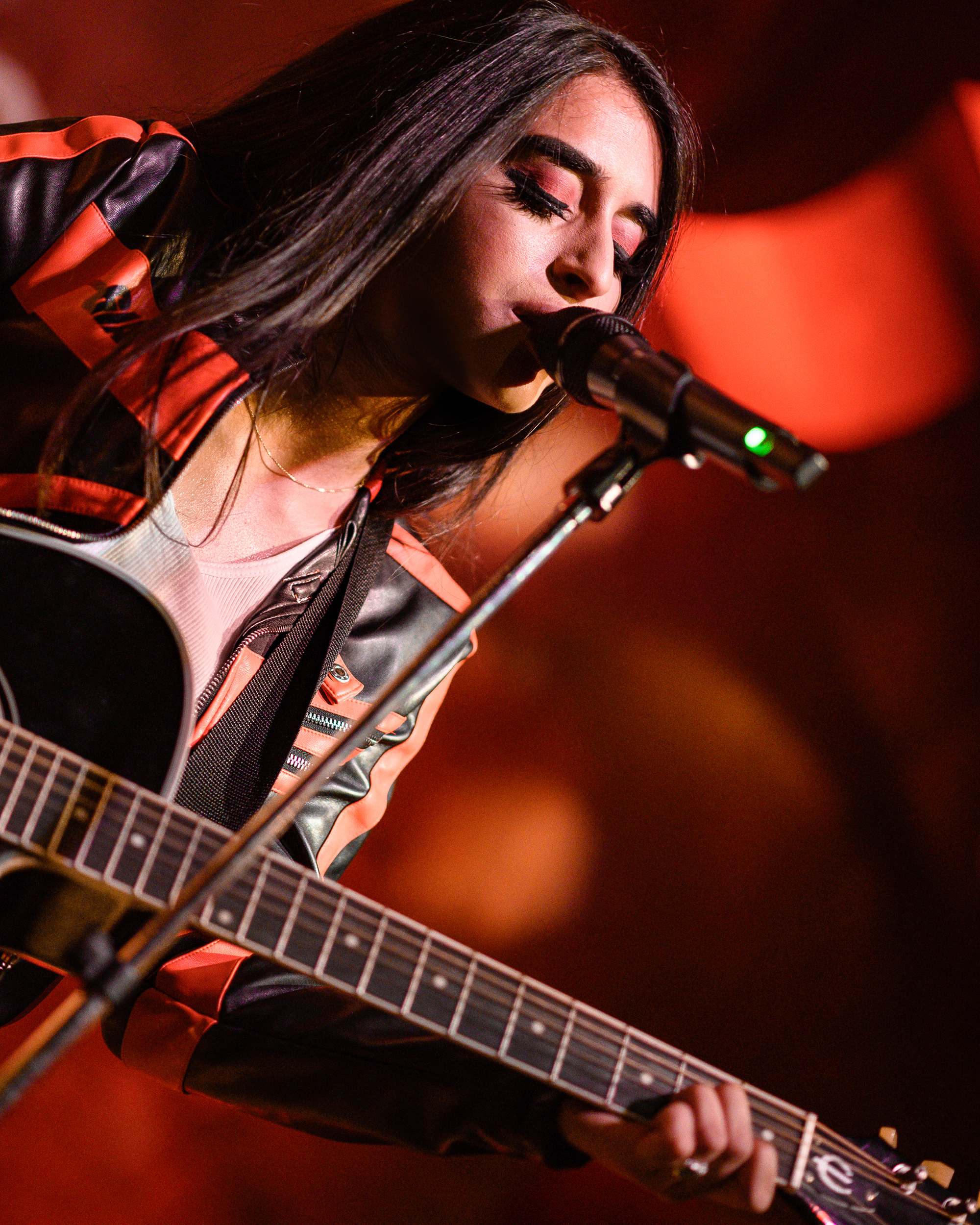
- Woods performing at Bardot Hollywood in 2019

Background information
- Born: Natali Nassiri; May 22, 1996 (age 30)
- Origin: Los Angeles, California, U.S.
- Genres: Electropop
- Years active: 2015–present
- Labels: Disruptor; Sony; Snafu
- Website: www.giawoods.com

Gia Woods (born May 22, 1996) is a Los Angeles–based pop musician.

== Early life ==
Woods grew up in a traditional Persian household in Los Angeles. Her father owned a popular Persian restaurant, and her mother was a stay-at-home mom who also handled the business side of the restaurant. Woods became interested in music in part because she "was pretty shy and didn't have a lot of people to open up to." Her older sister encouraged her to join choir in high school, which led to her pursuit of music as a career.

== Career ==
Woods was scouted by her first manager in her senior year of high school from a choir performance. As a result, she pursued music full time immediately after graduating, rather than going into dentistry as she had planned.

Woods debuted in 2015 with the song "Only A Girl," which describes her first same-sex relationship. Woods came out as a lesbian to her family through the song. The accompanying music video has over 10 million hits on YouTube.

Woods released her debut EP Cut Season on October 9, 2020. The EP was influenced by the lack of support Woods received from friends after her experience leaving a four-year relationship and her father's death.

In 2021, Woods released the first part of her two-volume EP, Heartbreak County, which reflects on life in Los Angeles. It was preceded by the singles "Enough of You", "Oh My God" and "Next Girlfriend". She announced the second part with the release of its lead single, "Hello", in May 2022. The full EP was released in October 2022; while the first part covers more of the surface-level glamor of Los Angeles life, the second part explores its "deeper, more raw side." Woods described the writing process for Heartbreak County as a form of escapism following a breakup. The breakup, in which her ex-girlfriend left her to date Woods's other ex-girlfriend, was the subject of the final song from the EP.

During 2023, she dropped the singles "Gia Would", "Elevation", "Heartbreak Radio" and "Somebody Else's Baby" which will ultimately lead to her fourth EP Your Engine, released on November 1, 2023.

== Involvement in the LGBT Community ==
Woods has performed at several LGBT events, such as Nashville's OutLoud Music Festival in 2019, North Jersey Pride Festival in 2019, the Thrive with Pride concert in 2021, and Jersey Pride in 2022. She has also been featured in Calvin Klein's LGBTQ Pride campaign, and has been a Savage X Fenty ambassador.

== Influences ==
Woods is inspired by Radiohead, Green Day and Madonna.

== Discography ==
=== Extended plays ===
Title	EP details
Cut Season	Release: October 9, 2020; Label: Disruptor, Sony; Format: Digital download, streaming
Heartbreak County, Vol 1.	Release: October 8, 2021; Label: Snafu; Format: Digital download, streaming
Heartbreak County, Vol. 2	Release: October 27, 2022; Label: Elle Records; Format: Digital download, streaming
Your Engine	Release: November 1, 2023; Label: Elle Records; Format: Digital download, streaming

=== Singles ===
Title	Year	Album
"Only a Girl"	2015	Non-album singles
"Heart Won't Forget" (with Matoma)	2016	Non-album singles
"What I Like"	2017	Non-album singles
"Jump the Fence"	2019	Non-album singles
"New Girlfriend"	2019	Non-album singles
"Keep on Coming"	2019	Non-album singles
"One Big Party"	2019	Non-album singles
"Feel It"	2019	Non-album singles
"Hungry"	2020	Cut Season
"Ego"	2020	Cut Season
"Naive"	2020	Cut Season
"Into It"	2020	Cut Season
"Chaos"	2020	Cut Season
"All I Know"	2020	Cut Season
"Enough of You"	2021	Heartbreak County, Vol. 1
"Oh My God"	2021	Heartbreak County, Vol. 1
"Next Girlfriend"	2021	Heartbreak County, Vol. 1
"Hello"	2022	Heartbreak County, Vol. 2
"Hello"	2022	Heartbreak County, Vol. 2
"Lesbionic"	2022	Heartbreak County, Vol. 2
"Spend It" (with BAYLI)	2022	Heartbreak County, Vol. 2
"Cover Girl"	2022	Heartbreak County, Vol. 2
"PCH (Pretty Cold Heart)"	2022	Heartbreak County, Vol. 2
"Gia Would"	2023	Your Engine
"Elevation"	2023	Your Engine
"Heartbreak Radio"	2023	Your Engine
"Somebody Else's Baby"	2023	Your Engine
