= The Penthouse (album) =

Studio album by Michael Medrano
- Released: January 31, 2025
- Genres: Electro-pop, dance-pop, eurotrance
- Length: 29:30
- Label: Self-released
- Producers: Mads Mason; Michael Medrano; Gregory Dillon; Husky&Pug; Jack Laboz; Jon Santana

Michael Medrano chronology
| LoveSexDrugs (2020) | The Penthouse (2025) |

Singles from The Penthouse
- 1. "Karma" Released: 13 October 2023; 2. "Pornstar ☆" Released: 9 February 2024; 3. "Kiss Kiss Bang Bang" Released: 12 April 2024; 4. "Tom Hardy" Released: 28 June 2024; 5. "Hollywood" Released: 13 December 2024

The Penthouse (stylised in all caps) is the second studio album, and second full-length project by American singer-songwriter Michael Medrano. It was released on January 31, 2025 independently, via Medrano's own record label.

The album was executive produced by Mads Mason, and includes additional production by Medrano, Gregory Dillon, Jon Santana, Jack Laboz, and Husky&Pug. It also includes a collaboration with American singer-songwriter That Kid. It marks Medrano first full-length release since his debut studio album "LoveSexDrugs" in 2020.

== Background ==
In a post on his Instagram account featuring the official album artwork, Medrano said of the project:

"i want to thank everyone who got me here from my closest friends to the farthest away fans across the world; i have never felt so close to all of you. this has been a transformative body of work for me and i’ve had nothing but fun making it — now i want to give that experience back to you. this time around, i did it my way. no people pleasing, no chasing, just me, a drink in my hand, and an album full of dirrty fun. i have a lottttt more up my sleeve, just you wait and see 😮‍💨 “tout est ici dans le penthouse” ★"

— Michael Medrano, on the releasing of The Penthouse

== Promotion ==
To promote the album, Medrano released two special customized editions with an exclusive demo on each edition, available on his website.

=== Singles ===
The album lead single "Karma" was released on October 13, 2023. A music video directed by Robbie Joseph was released on October 27.

The second single "Pornstar ☆" was released alongside its accompanying music video, on February 9, 2024. An uncensored version featuring explicit pornography scenes was released on his X account. The album's third single "Kiss Kiss Bang Bang" was released on April 12, 2024, alongside its music video.

The fourth single "Tom Hardy", named after the English actor and model, was released on June 28, 2024. A music video for the single was released on July 3.

The album's fifth single, "Hollywood", is a cover of the 2003 single by Madonna, was released on December 13, 2024 alongside the album's pre-order.

The album sixth single "Casino", a remix of the That Kid song, was released on January 24, 2025, just days before the album's release.

== Track listing ==
The Penthouse track listing
| No. | Title | Lyrics | Producer(s) | Length |
|---|---|---|---|---|
| 1. | "Martini (Shots)" | Michael Medrano | Mads Mason | 2:25 |
| 2. | "The Penthouse" | Medrano | Mason | 2:26 |
| 3. | "Tom Hardy" | Medrano; Mason | Mason | 2:18 |
| 4. | "Instant Classic" | Medrano | Michael Medrano; Mason | 2:22 |
| 5. | "Pornstar ☆" | Medrano; Mason | Medrano; Mason | 3:18 |
| 6. | "Hollywood" | Madonna; Mirwais Ahmadzaï | Mason | 3:10 |
| 7. | "Casino" (Michael Medrano remix; with That Kid) | Spencer Joseph; David Singer-Vine | Mason; Jon Santana; Jack Laboz | 2:32 |
| 8. | "Michelangelo" | Medrano | Mason | 2:40 |
| 9. | "Sylvia" | Medrano; Gregory Dillon; Eden Hunter | Gregory Dillon | 3:09 |
| 10. | "Kiss Kiss Bang Bang" | Medrano; Mason; Victoria Alkin; Louice Lindberg | Mason; Husky&Pug | 3:12 |
| 11. | "Karma" | Medrano; Mason | Medrano; Mason | 3:18 |
| Total length: | | | | 29:30 |

CD release bonus track
| No. | Title | Length |
|---|---|---|
| 12. | "Old Technology (Demo)" | 3:00 |
| Total length: | | 32:30 |

== Personnel ==
Credits on Apple Music:

Musicians

- Michael Medrano — vocals (all tracks), songwriting (tracks 1-5,8-11), co-producer (tracks 4-5,11)
- Mads Mason — songwriting (tracks 3,5,10-11), executive producer (tracks 1-8,10-11)
- Madonna — songwriting (track 6)
- Mirwais Ahmadzaï — songwriting (track 6)
- That Kid — songwriting, featuring artist (track 7)
- David Singer-Vine — songwriting, assistant engineer (track 7)
- Jon Santana — co-producer (track 7)
- Jack Laboz — co-producer (track 7)
- Gregory Dillon — songwriting, additional producer (track 9)
- Eden Hunter — songwriting, background vocals (track 9)
- Husky&Pug — songwriting, producers (track 10)
- Matt Wolach — engineer (track 11)
- Roy Boukris — engineer (track 11)
- HYRA — songwriting
- Andrea Di Giovanni — guest vocals
- Savetheeros — guest vocals

Artwork

- Robbie Joseph — photography, creative direction
- Isaac Luna — creative direction
- WWZ Studio — behind the scene footage

== Release history ==
Release dates and formats for "The Penthouse"
| Region | Date | Format | Version | Label | Ref. |
|---|---|---|---|---|---|
| Various | 31 January 2025 | Digital download; streaming; LP; CD | Standard Edition | Michael Medrano Records | |
| Various | 31 January 2025 | Customized CD | Instant Classic Edition | Michael Medrano Records | |
| Various | 31 January 2025 | Customized CD | Martini Edition | Michael Medrano Records | |
