= Susanna Paasonen =

Finnish feminist scholar (born 1975)

- Born: 1975 (age 50–51); Helsinki, Finland
- Education: University of Turku
- Known for: Writings on the rise in popularity of internet pornography
- Scientific career
- Fields: Media Studies
- Workplaces: University of Turku
- Thesis: Figures of fantasy: women, cyberdiscourse and the popular internet (2002)

Susanna Paasonen (born 1975, Helsinki) is a Finnish feminist scholar. She is a Professor of Media Studies at the University of Turku, and was a visiting scholar at MIT in 2016. She gained her PhD from the University of Turku in 2002; her dissertation was on gender and the popularization of the internet, which was later published through Peter Lang. After holding positions at the universities of Tampere, Jyväskylä and Helsinki, Paasonen was appointed Professor of Media Studies at the University of Turku on 1 August 2011, and publishes on internet research, media theory, sexuality, pornography and affect.

== Research ==
On Monday, 4 April 2016, Paasonen gave a lecture at Brown University in the USA on the politics and culture of online porn. In the essay, "Glimmers of the forbidden fruit: Reminiscing pornography, conceptualizing the archive," written along with Katariina Kyrölä, Paasonen traces the evolution of the "porn stash" from a physical collection to a digital one, and in doing so, examines cyberporn as a site of identity formation. She and Kyrölä suggest that pornography occasions the accumulation of a somatic archive, which are "not merely reservoirs of extra-cognitive sensation but also knowingly curated, reflected upon and reworked: they are simultaneously material and semiotic, intimate and culturally specific, affective and open to representation." In her lecture at Brown, Paasonen suggested that digital pornography must not be understood as something that creeps into society from the outside, but rather as something that already exists in contemporary culture. She writes, "Encounters with pornography therefore become incorporated as carnal capacity-- as what we can imagine our bodies enjoying and being capable of, or not enjoying and being capable of." Paasonen argues, therefore, that interactions with pornography, therefore, can contribute to the development of an individual's sexual identity.

== Awards ==
The Finnish Academy of Science awarded her the Jutikkala Prize of €15,000 14 October 2011. In the same year Paasonen published the book, Carnal Resonance: Affect and Online Pornography, through MIT Press. In October 2020, Paasonen, Kylie Jarrett and Ben Light won the Association of Internet Researchers' Nancy Baym Book Award for NSFW: Sex, Humor, and Risk in Social Media, published with MITP in 2019.

== Bibliography ==
=== Books ===
- Paasonen, Susanna (2002). Figures of fantasy: women, cyberdiscourse, and the popular Internet (PhD thesis). Turku: University of Turku. ISBN 9789512921348.
- Paasonen, Susanna; Consalvo, Mia (2002). Women and everyday uses of the internet: agency & identity. New York: Peter Lang. ISBN 9780820461410.
- Paasonen, Susanna (2005). Figures of fantasy: Internet, women, and cyberdiscourse. New York: Peter Lang. ISBN 9780820476070.
- Paasonen, Susanna; Nikunen, Kaarina; Saarenmaa, Laura (2007). Pornification: sex and sexuality in media culture. Oxford New York: Berg. ISBN 9781845207045.
- Paasonen, Susanna; Liljeström, Marianne (2010). Working with affect in feminist readings: disturbing differences. London New York: Routledge. ISBN 9780415481397.
- Paasonen, Susanna (2011). Carnal resonance: affect and online pornography. Cambridge, Massachusetts: MIT Press. ISBN 9780262016315.
- Paasonen, Susanna; Hillis, Ken; Petit, Michael (2015). Networked affect. Cambridge, Massachusetts: The MIT Press. ISBN 9780262028646.
- Paasonen, Susanna (2018). Many Splendored Things: Thinking Sex and Play. London: Goldsmiths Press. ISBN 9781906897826.
- Paasonen, Susanna; Jarrett, Kylie; Light, Ben (2019). NSFW: Sex, humor, and risk in social media. Cambridge, Massachusetts: MIT Press. ISBN 9780262043052.
- Paasonen, Susanna; Attwood, Feona; McKee, Alan; Mercer, John; Smith, Clarissa (2020). Objectification: On the difference between sex and sexism. London New York: Routledge. ISBN 9780367199111.
- Sundén, Jenny; Paasonen, Susanna (2020). Who's laughing now? Feminist tactics in social media. Cambridge, Massachusetts: MIT Press. ISBN 9780262044721.
- Paasonen, Susanna (2021). Dependent, Distracted, Bored: Affective Formations in Networked Media. Cambridge, Massachusetts: MIT Press. ISBN 9780262045674.
- Paasonen, Susanna (2023). Yul Brunner: Exoticism, Cosmopolitanism and Screen Masculinity. Edinburgh: Edinburgh University Press. ISBN 9781474497954.
- Sunday, Jenny; Paasonen, Susanna; Tiidenberg, Katrin (2026). Hot Connections: Why Sexual Platforms Matter. Cambridge, Massachusetts: MIT Press. ISBN 9780262052061.

=== Journal articles ===
- Paasonen, Susanna (July 1998). "Digital, human, animal, PLANT: the politics of cyberfeminism?". N.paradoxa. 2. KT Press: 16–22.
- Paasonen, Susanna (2002), "Cyberfeminism and the question of freedom", in von Oldenburg, Helene; Reiche, Claudia (eds.), Very cyberfeminist international reader: OBN Conference, Hamburg, December 13-16, 2001 (PDF), Berlin: B-books, pp. 78–81, ISBN 9783933557346.
- Paasonen, Susanna (October 2009). "Healthy sex and pop porn: pornography, feminism and the Finnish context". Sexualities. 12 (5). SAGE: 586–604. doi:10.1177/1363460709340369. S2CID 143117661.
- Paasonen, Susanna (January 2014). "Between meaning and mattering: on affect and porn studies". Porn Studies. 1 (1–2). Taylor and Francis: 136–142. doi:10.1080/23268743.2014.880225.
- Paasonen, Susanna; Kyrölä, Katariina (April 2015). "Glimmers of the forbidden fruit: reminiscing pornography, conceptualizing the archive". International Journal of Cultural Studies. 19 (6). SAGE: 595–610. doi:10.1177/1367877915580625. S2CID 145733454.

== See also ==
- Baitbus
- Cyberculture
- Cyberethics
- Internet pornography
- Feminist theory
- Gender studies
- Internet ethics
