= Baitbus =

American pornography website

- Available in: English
- Industry: Pornography
- Website: baitbus.com
- Commercial: Yes
- Current status: Active

Baitbus.com is a website specialising in gay pornography of the gay-for-pay type, which claims to bring "straight boys over to the dark side". It has been described as "part practical joke and part fantasy that plays with the contingency of straightness and straight male identity in particular" by Susanna Paasonen.

== Description ==
A typical Baitbus plot usually involves a male, seemingly a heterosexual stranger, being confronted by the cameraman. The cameraman typically talks to the other male, convincing him to get into the eponymous minibus, and receive a sum of money for having sex with a woman on camera. At some point in the proceedings, the man is blindfolded and another man, typically – but not always – acting as the bottom, proceeds to have oral sex with the other male. At this moment, the heterosexual male usually appears to be upset or angry at finding out that he has been engaging in sex with another male; however, when the heterosexual man is offered a larger quantity of money to continue his sex act with the gay male, he reluctantly agrees. He is then filmed having anal sex and administering cum shots, before being pushed out of the minibus. The typical ending scene is, however recognized as complete fantasy, as such an act would violate state and federal law.

== Assessement ==
Shannon Gilreath writes that, on websites such as Baitbus.com, discrimination against gay men is thus sexualised, with heterosexuals on the top and gay men on the bottom. There is also the suggestion that it reflects the discourses of an antagonistic heterosexuality due to the outrage and disgust on the part of depicted in the encounter. Another reading also notes that it reflects the predatory gay male, prostituting straight men, making them abject in ways usually practiced on women.

== See also ==
- Homosexual recruitment
- Fake Taxi
