= Hot Haus =

- Genre: Reality competition
- Presented by: Tiffany Pollard
- Judges: Current: Matthew Camp; Nicky Monet; Former: Cupcakke
- Country of origin: Canada
- Original language: English
- No. of seasons: 2
- No. of episodes: 13

Original release
- Network: OUTtv
- Release: January 27, 2022 – present

Related
- Slag Wars

Hot Haus is a reality television competition series aimed at finding the next queer sex symbol. The show premiered on January 27, 2022 on OUTtv. Hot Haus is the brainchild of the creative team behind Slag Wars. It is hosted by Tiffany “New York” Pollard and judged by rapper CupcakKe, social media personality Matt Camp, and trans activist Nicky Monet.

== Season overview ==
Season	Premiere	Final	Winner	Runner(s)-up	No. of contestants	Winner's prizes
1	January 27, 2022	February 24, 2022	Fantasia	Saint Anique	7	Title of "Queer Sex Icon"; $10,000 Cash prize from Scruff
2	March 23, 2023	May 11, 2023	Alicia Goku	Cleo Mercury; Delicious Gucci	7	Title of "Next Queer Sex Symbol"; $25,000 Cash prize from Jerkmate

== Season 1 ==
=== Contestants ===
Names and cities stated are at time of filming.

Contestant	Hometown	Outcome
Fantasia	Miami, Florida	Winner
Saint Anique	Las Vegas, Nevada	Runner-up
Alex	Los Angeles, California	3rd Place
Juju Minxxx	Chicago, Illinois	3rd Place
Sapphire	Pittsburgh, Pennsylvania	3rd Place
Kash Dinero	North Carolina	6th Place
Sevndeep	Washington, D.C.	7th Place

=== Contestant progress ===
Contestant	Episode 1	Episode 2		Episode 3	Episode 4		Episode 5	Episode 6
Fantasia	WIN	SAFE		WIN	WIN		Winner	Guest
Saint Anique	SAFE	WIN		SAFE	WIN		Runner-up	Guest
Alex	SAFE	WIN	BTM2	BTM2	WIN	ELIM	Judge	Guest
Juju Minxxx	BTM2	SAFE		WIN	ELIM		Judge	Guest
Sapphire	WIN	SAFE		BTM2	ELIM		Judge	Guest
Kash Dinero	SAFE	ELIM		Judge				Guest
Sevndeep	ELIM	Judge						Guest

The contestant won Hot Haus.
The contestant was a runner-up.
The contestant won the Warm-up challenge.
The contestant won the Inferno challenge.
The contestant was safe.
The contestant was in the bottom.
The contestant was eliminated.

=== Episodes ===
No. overall	No. in season	Title	Original release date
1	1	"Stripping & Secrets"	January 27, 2022
2	2	"Freestyles & Filth"	January 27, 2022
3	3	"Cam Shows & Chaos"	February 3, 2022
4	4	"Fleshjacks & Feelings"	February 10, 2022
5	5	"The Community & The Crown"	February 17, 2022
6	6	"The Reunion"	February 24, 2022

== Season 2 ==
=== Contestants ===
Names and cities stated are at time of filming.

Contestant	Hometown	Outcome
Alicia Goku	Los Angeles, California	Winner
Cleo Mercury	Kentucky	Runner-up
Delicious Gucci	Chicago, Illinois	Runner-up
Sin Silva	Miami, Florida	4th Place
Austin Spears (Antifabussy)	Los Angeles, California	5th Place
Vanniall	New York City, New York	6th Place
Giovanni V	Atlanta, Georgia	7th Place

=== Contestant progress ===
Contestant	Episode 2	Episode 3	Episode 4	Episode 5	Episode 6		Episode 7
Alicia Goku	BTM2	WIN	WIN	WIN	SAFE	Winner	Guest
Cleo Mercury	WIN	SAFE	SAFE	WIN	SAFE	Runner-up	Guest
Delicious Gucci	SAFE	SAFE	ELIM	Judge	IN	Runner-up	Guest
Sin Silva	WIN	BTM2	WIN	ELIM	OUT	Judge	Guest
Austin Spears	SAFE	WIN	ELIM	Judge	OUT	Judge	Guest
Vanniall	SAFE	ELIM	Judge		OUT	Judge	Guest
Giovanni V	ELIM	Judge			OUT	Judge	Guest

The contestant won Hot Haus.
The contestant was a runner-up.
The contestant won the Warm-up challenge.
The contestant won the Inferno challenge.
The contestant won re-entry into the competition.
The contestant had a chance to win re-entry into the competition and lost.
The contestant was safe.
The contestant was in the bottom.
The contestant was eliminated.

=== Episodes ===
No. overall	No. in season	Title	Original release date
7	1	"Casting Special: The Hottie Hunt"	March 23, 2023
Guest Judges: Fantasia (Winner of Season 1), Joey Mills, Max Konnor and Boomer Banks (Cast of X-Rated)
8	2	"Luck Be A Hottie"	March 30, 2023
Guest Judge: Willam Belli; Guest: Saint Anique
9	3	"Playing with Balls"	April 6, 2023
Guest Judge: Johnny Scruff (Founder of Scruff); Photographer: Bob of Scotland
10	4	"The Jerkmate Cam Shows"	April 13, 2023
Guest Judge: MJ (Representative from Jerkmate)
11	5	"Click Bait Hotties"	April 27, 2023
Guest Judges: Max Konner and Daniel Harvell (Fleshlight Director of Marketing)
12	6	"The Next Queer Sex Symbol"	May 4, 2023
Guest Judges: Fantasia (Winner of Season 1), Stormy Daniels and Saint Anique (Runner-up of Season 1)
13	7	"The Reunion"	May 11, 2023
Guest Host: Sapphire Slay

== Reception ==
Hot Haus has garnered widespread, positive reception. It was included in BuzzFeed’s 10 New Shows We’re Loving List, with the publication calling the show "challenging, fun, and queer as hell".

Dazed exclusively dropped the Hot Haus trailer. In their piece, Tiffany Pollard was quoted as saying, "I’ve been working in reality TV for a long time now, and I can promise you this cast is something special." CupcakKe told the magazine "Listen, listen, listen... listen, Linda! All jokes aside, this is hands down one of the more creative shows I have witnessed in a while. Hot Haus is the moment. It’s very different. It’s a great way to showcase the amazing talents coming from the LGBTQ+ community. It’s truly art."

Fans on social media have rallied around the show, especially on TikTok, where it’s hashtag (#hothaus) has exceeded 3 million views. On March 16, 2022, Hot Haus was renewed for a second season.

== See also ==
- Slag Wars: The Next Destroyer
- Tiffany Pollard
