= Michael Medrano =

American singer and songwriter

- Born: Torrance, California, US
- Genres: Dance; electronic; nu-disco
- Occupations: Singer; songwriter; producer
- Years active: 2016–present
- Labels: Independent; Snafu Records
- Website: stachepapistore.square.site

Michael Medrano (born November 26) is an American singer and songwriter, based in Los Angeles. He gained attention after the release of his 2019 single, "Fluids". Medrano has written songs for other artists such as AJ Mitchell.

His debut studio album LoveSexDrugs was released on April 7, 2023, through Snafu Records and his second studio album The Penthouse, was self-released on January 31, 2025.

== Early life ==
Michael Medrano was born in Torrance, CA, United States. He grew up in a conservative house with Jehovah's Witnesses beliefs, and has shared that in his household holidays and birthdays were not celebrated. Medrano's father is from Spain and is of Catalan ancestry and his mother is from Los Angeles and has Irish and Scottish ancestry. He has expressed that parting ways from his conservative upbringing is what made him compelled to create provocative art.

== Career ==
Medrano released his debut single titled, "Be There" in 2016. He has described his early releases as "boring songs that I didn't like, because I thought it was what I was 'supposed to do'. It was unfulfilling and completely untrue to me as an artist." In 2019, he released the single "Fluids", the song marked a shift of Medrano sound and aesthetic, and gained attention on social medias and remains his most popular song on streaming services. He describes the song as the music that he really wanted to make. After years of releasing material as an independent artist, during the COVID-19 pandemic, Medrano was signed to a major record label, but was dropped shortly after earning his first Top 40 radio single. He eventually continued working as an independent artist releasing material under his own label Snafu Records, and promoting his work on social medias such as TikTok and X. On April 7, 2023, Medrano released his first project, LoveSexDrugs, which includes the singles "Personal Heaven", "Naked", "Fluids", "Disco Sleaze" and the collaboration "Do Your Thing, Babe" with Funk Leblanc.

== Personal life ==
Medrano is bisexual. Speaking to Billboard Magazine, Medrano said, "Sexuality isn't black and white, it's a colorful spectrum with a lot of in-betweens that we should be okay with exploring."

== Discography ==
List of studio albums, with selected details
Title	Release details	Ref.
Lovesexdrugs	Release date: April 7, 2023; Label: Snafu; Format: Digital download, streaming, LP	
The Penthouse	Release date: January 31, 2025; Label: Self-released; Format: Digital download, streaming, LP	
International Male	Release date: November 6, 2026; Label: Self-released; Format: Digital download, streaming, LP	

List of reissues, with selected details
Title	Release details	Ref.
Lovesexdrugs - The Soaking Wet Edition	Release date: July 2024; Label: Snafu; Format: Digital download, streaming, LP	

=== Singles ===
==== As lead artist ====
Title	Year	Album	Ref.
"Be There"	2016	Non-album singles	
"Heal" (featuring Steve Grand)	2018	Non-album singles	
"Love Somebody Else"	2018	Non-album singles	
"Easier"	2019	Non-album singles	
"Fluids"	2019	Non-album singles	
"No More Tequila"	2019	Non-album singles	
"Do Your Thing!"	2020	Non-album singles	
"Bump This" (with Jake Germain and Mimi Zima)	2020	Non-album singles	
"Hands On U"	2020	Non-album singles	
"Sugar" (with Dance Yourself Clean)	2021	Non-album singles	
"I Don't Wanna Talk About Love"	2021	Non-album singles	
"Personal Heaven"	2021	Lovesexdrugs	
"Do Your Thing, Babe" (with Funk Leblanc)	2022	Lovesexdrugs	
"Naked"	2022	Lovesexdrugs	
"Disco Sleaze"	2022	Lovesexdrugs	
"Lsd, Pt.2"	2023	Non-album singles	
"Air U Breathe" (with HYRA)	2023	Non-album singles	
"Karma"	2023	THE PENTHOUSE	
"Pornstar"	2024	THE PENTHOUSE	
"Kiss Kiss Bang Bang"	2024	THE PENTHOUSE	
"Tom Hardy"	2024	THE PENTHOUSE	
"Hollywood"	2024	THE PENTHOUSE	
"PRIMADONNA"	2025	INTERNATIONAL MALE	
"DANSE"	2026	INTERNATIONAL MALE	
"DANGEROUS"	2026	INTERNATIONAL MALE	
"F*CK FOREVER"	2026	INTERNATIONAL MALE	
"SO EUROPEAN"	2026	INTERNATIONAL MALE	
"SEND IT"	2026	INTERNATIONAL MALE	
