= Babynymph =

Greek musician

Babynymph (stylised in all caps) is an Amsterdam-based DJ, music producer, and artist.. Her full name is Baby Bischoff. She was born in Moscow, grew up in Athens and currently lives in the Netherlands. Babynymph is one of the most recognisable personalities of the underground scene of Athens. Her debut album "Climax" was released on June 6, 2025. The album includes 6 singles. This album is dedicated to all the "beautiful creatures" that Baby met on her long journey.

BABYNYMPH in Vienna

== Work ==
Babynymph has worked with artists and producers such as Sophie, Basside, Chase Icon, Evita Manji, and Raed Raees. Her music is an assemblage of deconstructed club, "slut pop", Ibiza summer hits and SoundCloud rap.

The first single from her EP Pornopop – Abhorrence (Kunthouse, 2023) was "Ice".

Babynymph was featured on singer Mel4Ever's 2023 single, "Big League Chew", alongside New York City artist Linux. The track was co-produced by Jack Hoffman and Babynymph.
