= Chase Icon =

American singer-songwriter (born 2001)

- Born: February 22, 2001 (age 25)
- Genres: Pop; hyperpop
- Occupations: Singer; songwriter; actress
- Years active: 2013–present
- Labels: Fame Hooker; Rebellion

Chase Icon (born February 22, 2001) is an American singer, songwriter, social media content creator, and reality television personality native to Southern California.

== Early life ==
The youngest of three sisters, Chase Icon was born into a devout Christian family. Throughout her upbringing, her parents strictly forbade her from engaging with any form of media which they deemed oppositional to their conservative religious values. Early into her adolescence, Icon decided to renounce the teachings of her faith that she found incongruent with her identity and personal desires. Consequently, at the age of 15, she was forced to leave her family home to reside with her eldest sister.

== Career ==
=== 2013–2020: Career beginnings ===
In June 2013, Icon started to gain a following on the social media platform Twitter after creating an initially anonymous account to participate in online communities dedicated to discussing contemporary pop culture. However, Icon gained popularity in late-2019 when she started uploading comedic impersonations of female celebrities to her profile—most notably, Kylie Jenner and Lady Gaga. The widespread virality of these videos quickly propelled her towards online notoriety among predominantly queer youth on the internet, providing Icon with opportunities to experiment in musicianship.

In 2020, Icon starred in the British reality-television competition program Slag Wars: The Next Destroyer as the series’ primary narrator.

Following positive reception towards her vocal and creative contributions to the song "Lice" in collaboration with Russian hyperpop artist Kyunchi in June 2020, Icon started on her first extended play scheduled to release the following year.

=== 2021: "SRS" and Domination ===
On January 15, 2021, Icon formally commenced her solo career in music with the release of her debut single "SRS" (an acronym for “sex reassignment surgery”). In April, she released "I'm Perfect". Both singles were produced by independent electronic-dance producer, Space Candy.

Icon collaborated with Greek DJ BABYNYMPH on the song "Nemesis", released on May 28. Later that year, she released "Life Alert", the lead single to her debut extended play, Domination. The EP was released on September 1 to generally favorable reviews from public audiences.

In December, she released the single "Zip" with Spanish musician Rakky Ripper.

=== 2022–2024: The Girlfriend Experience and "Club Cooter" ===
In late 2021 and early 2022, Icon released the collection of singles "808", "Like Me", and "Call Your Mom". She was also featured on Croatian producer Only Fire's single "Cheeks", released on February 24, 2022.

On June 17, 2022, she announced the single "Nancy", which was released on June 23.

In September, she appeared on American singer That Kid's mixtape Superstar (2022) on the track "Thelma & Louis", released the single "Chase Radio", and announced her upcoming extended play to be released in October.

On October 5, Boiler Room announced their December 2022 Subculture Party on Twitter; the tweet featured an unreleased song by Icon, later revealed to be "Bang (My Body)". On October 8, Icon announced her second extended play, The Girlfriend Experience, set to be released the following week. She teased tracks "Bang (My Body)" and "You Can't Come to My Party" on her social networks to promote the EP. It was released on October 14, 2022.

On March 29, 2023, Icon released the song "Club Cooter" exclusively on SoundCloud, heavily sampling Felix da Housecat's "Silver Screen Shower Scene".

On June 28, Icon released the single "SoCal Girl". On November 4, "Bad Ass Stripper" was released on SoundCloud and YouTube; the song is not available on streaming services due to its use of a sample from "Bad Ass Strippa" (2004) by Jentina.

In 2024, Icon released exclusive vinyl pressings of The Girlfriend Experience and the double A-side "Girl Like Chase" / "SoCal Girl" in collaboration with Graffiti Records. She collaborated with Miss Madeline and Umru on the tracks "Luxury" and "Records", respectively. Icon released the singles "Job Application", "They Wanna", and "RIP", with 6arelyhuman featuring on the latter.

=== 2025: Icon Baby ===
On March 25, 2025, Icon released her debut studio album, Icon Baby. Tomás Mier of Rolling Stone wrote that "[w]ith the album, Icon solidifies her legacy of delivering underground queer bangers that embrace an 'almost delusional' confidence and life on the internet."

== Personal life ==
Icon is a transgender woman. She currently resides in Los Angeles, California.

== Discography ==
=== Studio albums ===
Title	Details
Icon Baby	Released: March 25, 2025; Label: Fame Hooker; Format: CD, LP, digital download, streaming

=== Extended plays ===
Title	Details
Domination	Released: September 1, 2021; Label: Fame Hooker; Format: Digital download, streaming, vinyl
The Girlfriend Experience	Released: October 14, 2022; Label: Fame Hooker; Format: Digital download, streaming, vinyl
Strawberry Lemonade (with Miss Madeline)	Released: July 18, 2025; Label: Self-released; Format: Digital download, streaming

=== Singles ===
==== As lead artist ====
Year	Title	Album
2021	"SRS"	Non-album singles
2021	"I'm Perfect"	Non-album singles
2021	"Nemesis" (with BABYNYMPH)	Non-album singles
2021	"Life Alert"	Domination
2021	"808"	Non-album single
2021	"Zip" (with Rakky Ripper)	Nadie lo va a hacer por mí
2022	"Like Me"	Icon Baby
2022	"Call Your Mom"	Non-album singles
2022	"Nancy"	Non-album singles
2023	"Club Cooter: Reloaded"	Non-album singles
2023	"SoCal Girl"	Icon Baby
2023	"10 Bad Bitches" (with River Moon, Petal Supply, Warpstr, Umru, Iglooghost, and That Kid)	Non-album single
2023	"Abracadabra" (with Borgore and Cupcakke)	Chiaroscuro
2024	"Girl Like Chase"	Non-album single
2024	"Luxury" (with Miss Madeline)	So Dramatic
2024	"Records" (with Umru)	Non-album single
2024	"Job Application"	Icon Baby
2024	"They Wanna"	Non-album single
2024	"Botched" (with Fetish)	Klubfetish
2024	"RIP" (with 6arelyhuman)	Non-album singles
2024	"Motherhood" (with Jane's World)	Non-album singles
2025	"I Don't Sell (Records Remix)" (with Umru and JEL: The Digital Dream Girl)	Non-album single
2026	"BETTER LUCK NEXT TIME"	EXPOSURE
2026	"MONSTAR"	EXPOSURE
2026	"VIBRATE"	EXPOSURE

==== As featured artist ====
Year	Title	Album
2020	"Lice" (Kyunchi featuring Chase Icon)	Non-album singles
2020	"Stain on Me" (Only Fire featuring Chase Icon)	Non-album singles
2020	"Ratz" (Baby Sp!t featuring Chase Icon)	Heavy Metal Princess
2020	"Buy Me" (remix) (Nattalie Blake featuring Chase Icon)	Non-album single
2021	"Fuck Me Cuz I'm Hot!" (Wreckno featuring Chase Icon and Miss Tiddy)	Pansy
2021	"Fantasy" (Paisleigh Lynne featuring Chase Icon)	Non-album singles
2022	"Cheeks" (Only Fire featuring Chase Icon)	Non-album singles
2024	"Sex on Video" (Lozeak featuring Chase Icon)	Lozeak
2025	"In N Out" (Only Fire featuring Chase Icon)	Sex Demon

==== SoundCloud releases ====
Year	Title
2022	"Shoes"
2022	"Chase Radio"
2023	"Club Cooter" (Note: Removed in April 2023 following copyright dispute)
2023	"Bad Ass Stripper"

== Filmography ==
Year	Title	Role	Notes	Ref.
2020	Slag Wars: The Next Destroyer	Herself	Narrator	
2026	Backrooms v.s Pop Culture	Herself	Short film; archival footage	
