= Fake Taxi =

British pornography website

- Logo
- Available in: English
- Headquarters: London, {{{location_country}}}
- Country of origin: United Kingdom
- Owners: Amari Middleton (Yellow Production s.r.o.)
- Creator: Jonathan Todd
- Industry: Pornography
- Website: faketaxi.com
- Commercial: Yes
- Registration: Required
- Launched: 8 September 2012; 14 years ago
- Current status: Active
- Content licence: Copyrighted

Fake Taxi is a pornography website which produces videos within the reality pornography genre. Founded and currently owned by Jonathan Todd (aka "The YouPorn Guy" and simply "JT"), who also founded YouPorn, its online presence and assets are managed by Aylo along with related websites.

== History ==
The Fake Taxi website originated from Really Useful Ltd (Note: now "Yellow Production s.r.o.") in April 2013. Really Useful also managed several other similar pornographic websites. JT, its United Kingdom-based owner, had been named as "CEO of the Year" by adult industry news website XBIZ. Prior to the partnership with MindGeek/Manwin, Really Useful Ltd had functioned independently. Fake Taxi's sister sites include Fake Agent and Public Agent.

== Description ==
Fake Taxi's videos all follow a similar premise that start with a conversation between a taxi driver and a passenger. A typical video would begin with an actress depicting a passenger entering a taxi. The male or female driver, using persuasion fuelled oftentimes by the passenger's lack of funds, finds a way to convince his/her passenger to engage in sexual intercourse in the back of the taxi. Fake Taxi's website is categorised by videos, actresses and scenes from all Fakehub sites. Most content is viewable with paid membership only.

== Operations ==
In 2014, information technology company MindGeek, then known as Manwin, took over the management of online assets' for Really Useful Ltd.

Fake Taxi has released videos to websites such as Pornhub and YouPorn.

== Female Fake Taxi ==
MindGeek and Really Useful announced in February 2016 the launch of Female Fake taxi website. The lead actress is the United Kingdom-based adult actress Luscious Leona and the videos would follow the same premise of Fake Taxi, except reverse the gender roles wherein the female would be driving and seducing any passenger who dare to flag her down in Coventry.

== Awards ==
Year	Prize	Category	Result
2015	UKAP Awards	Best Website	Winner

== Vehicles ==
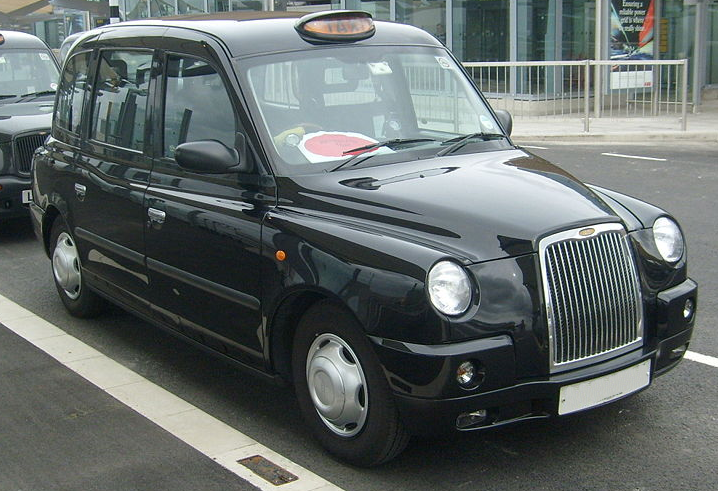
A TX4, similar to the vehicle used

In February 2019 Fake Taxi placed a 2006 TX4 taxi that had been used for filming for sale on eBay. It achieved a highest bid of £66,000 before eBay deleted the sale for contravening its policy on selling things with bodily fluids.

== See also ==
- Baitbus
