= Johnny Rapid =

American pornographic actor (born 1992)

- Born: Hylan Anthony Taylor; August 26, 1992 (age 33); Conyers, Georgia, U.S.
- Years active: 2010–present
- Height: 5 ft 6 in (168 cm)
- Children: 2
- Website: johnnyrapid.com

Hylan Anthony Taylor (born August 26, 1992), better known by his stage name Johnny Rapid, is an American gay pornographic film actor. Since 2010, he has appeared in over 200 pornographic scenes for Men.com studio, and now runs his own website.

== Early life ==
Hylan Anthony Taylor was born on August 26, 1992, in Conyers, Georgia, near Atlanta.

As a teenager, he was a car enthusiast, and a boxer. He graduated from Rockdale County High School in 2010, where he was a member of the school's wrestling team.

When he was 16–17, his girlfriend became pregnant, and then gave birth to their daughter.

At 18 years of age, he lost his job in the middle of summer, and decided to act in porn films to make money quickly.

== Career ==
Rapid started his pornography career with Boys First Time and Bukkake Boys studios. He then signed with Men.com as an exclusive, and released his first scene with them in November 2011.

He has starred in a documentary called I'm a Porn Star (2013), in which he talks about his life as a porn star, also describing his fantasies of rough sex and fast cars. Rapid won the Cybersocket Web Award for Best Pornstar in 2014.

In January 2015, Rapid publicly offered $2 million to Canadian singer Justin Bieber to shoot a pornographic scene with him. The singer never answered. Rapid went on to play Bieber in a gay porn parody by Men.com. He also played the role of Ash Ketchum in Men.com's gay porn parody of Pokémon Go in 2016, and the Flash in parodies of The Flash and Justice League released by Men.com in 2017 and 2018 respectively.

In 2017, he was one of the most sought after actors on Pornhub in the gay porn category. Partnering with Men.com in 2019, he launched a new website "JohnnyRapid.com" devoted entirely to him. By April 2021, Rapid's prolific pornographic film work included doing 300+ scenes with over 180 different male pornographic actors. He made his debut in both bisexual and straight porn in 2022.

Joseph Brennan has written a paper titled Going Bareback: Time and Aging in a Gay-for-Pay Porn Career discussing the event of Johnny— "arguably the biggest gay porn performer of the 2010s"— making his bareback debut in 2015, focusing on Str8UpGayPorn’s coverage of Rapid.

== Personal life ==
=== Arrest for battery ===
In December 2014, Rapid was arrested in Rockdale County, Georgia, and charged with battery for allegedly hitting and choking his girlfriend after she refused to participate with him in a sexual act with a 14-year-old girl.

According to Gay Star News, Rapid's girlfriend later contacted the officer writing the report in an "attempt to get [him] to forget the whole thing, that she's lying, that she made the whole thing up."

=== Sexuality and family ===
Discreet about his private life, Rapid previously defined himself as heterosexual and thus a gay-for-pay actor; however, in 2024 he came out as bisexual. Rapid has been married to a woman, and has a daughter and a son.

In March 2024, he posted a video on Instagram talking about his past. He revealed that he grew up in a broken home, where his mother was on drugs and his father was in jail, so his grandmother took him in. Addressing his arrest, he confessed that he was in an abusive relationship. He mentioned that he was diagnosed with borderline personality disorder, went to anger management and cognitive behaviour therapy, and started taking medication for ADHD and depression. He talked about struggling with his sexuality, how he refused to admit that he was attracted to both men and women. He also mentioned that he was in a polyamorous relationship.
