= Fantasia Royale Gaga =

American showgirl and drag queen

- Born: Jacksonville, Florida, U.S.
- Other names: Latavia Goldson; Latoya Saint James Royale; Fantasia
- Television: Hot Haus; The Boulet Brothers' Dragula (season 5)

Fantasia Royale Gaga is the stage name of Latavia Goldson, an American showgirl, drag performer, and entertainer. She is best known for winning the first season of Hot Haus and for competing on the fifth season of The Boulet Brothers' Dragula.

== Early life ==
Goldson was born in Jacksonville, Florida. She practiced theatre in high school, and abandoned her biological family at the age of 15, where she was regularly taken to a Christian church and told that being gay was sinful. Her drag parents (mentors) are Sasha Saint James and Lamont Royale, whose names inspired her original stage name, Latoya Saint James Royale. She began her medical gender transition by purchasing hormone replacement therapy estrogen from older trans women.

== Career ==
Fantasia Royale Gaga has been working in the South Florida queer and drag scenes since around 2013. She first rose to prominence after winning the first season of OutTV's Hot Haus in 2022. In 2023 she was named Miss Miami Beach Pride and appeared on the television series Miami Dolls. She also competed on season 5 of The Boulet Brothers' Dragula. She has also appeared on Botched, and has won over 25 other pageant titles, including Miss Metro, Miss Alibi, Miss Club Jade, and Miss Forever Bad. Her "home bar" is Palace Bar in South Beach.

== Personal life ==
Fantasia Royale Gaga is a Black trans woman. When she won Hot Haus she was the first Black trans woman to win a reality television competition. She has undergone multiple cosmetic surgeries, including five breast augmentations and facial feminization surgery, which included a canthoplasty.

== Filmography ==
Year	Title	Role	Notes
2022	Hot Haus	Contestant	Season 1; Winner (6 episodes)
2023	Botched	Herself	Guest (1 episode)
2023	Hot Haus	Herself	Guest judge (season 2)
2023	Miami Dolls	Herself	Main cast (6 episodes)
2023	The Boulet Brothers' Dragula	Contestant	Season 5; 5th place (9 episodes)
