= Ty Mitchell =

American pornographic actor and writer

- Born: April 8, 1993 (age 32); Texas, U.S.
- Occupations: Pornographic actor; writer

Ty Mitchell (born April 8, 1993) is an American-French writer and former gay pornographic actor.

== Work ==
Mitchell has a degree in gender studies and has written on various topics of LGBTQ life for online publications.

His criticism of the 2020 Oscars, in which he pointed out there were fewer female directors nominated than for the Str8UpGay Awards gay porn awards, went viral. He lives in Brooklyn, New York. His column defending himself attending parties on Fire Island during the COVID-19 pandemic were criticised on social media.

In 2019, he appeared in a skit on Saturday Night Live with actress Emma Stone.

Mitchell was nominated for the Best Newcomer Award at the 2020 GayVN Awards. In 2021, he appeared on Game Changer as an "expert" for the "Sex Toy or Dog Toy" minigame, introduced as cast member Grant O'Brien's "favorite porn star".

In 2023, Mitchell announced his retirement from the porn industry, citing his loss of interest in his sexual expression, his feeling he had "painted [himself] into a corner", and his desire for "space to create more of [himself]".
