= Matthew Camp =

American actor and model (born 1984)

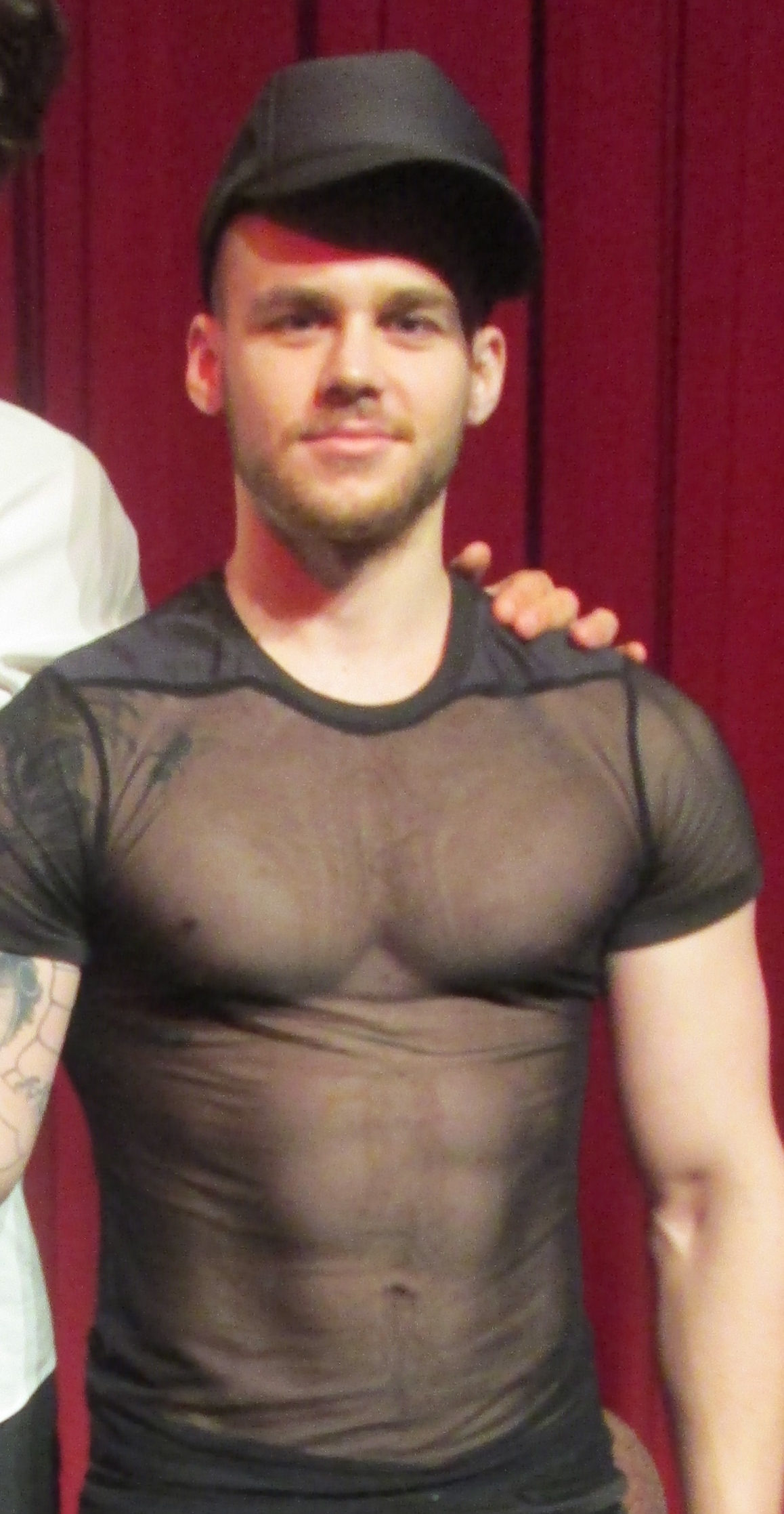
- Matthew Camp in 2012
- Born: Matthew Stephen Camp; March 15, 1984 (age 42); Santa Clara, California, U.S.

Matthew Camp (born March 15, 1984) is an American gay pornographic film actor and social media personality. Camp came to prominence in 2013 with Getting Go: The Go Doc Project. In 2020, Camp was co-host of the reality television competition series Slag Wars.

== Biography ==
Matthew Camp began his career as a go-go dancer in New York City bars at the age of 21. He is the protagonist of documentary project "Camp Chaos", created by Corey Krueckeberg.

Camp has modeled for underwear brands as well as created fragrance and clothing lines, including Matthew Camp Designs and Daddy Couture, a collaboration with Rebecca More. Camp was featured on the cover of the British gay magazine Attitude in 2019.

Camp is also known for being an LGBTQ+ and sex positivity activist. About 2018, when the club scene continued to slow down in New York, Camp moved to Hudson, New York and created an account on OnlyFans. Camp's Instagram account has more than half a million followers.

Camp was the victim of a suspected hate crime in early 2021. His house in Poughkeepsie was the target of an arson attack on January 14, while the perpetrator was captured on security cameras spreading the fire accelerant on the porch and setting the house ablaze.

== Filmography ==
Year	Film	Role	Comments
2010	Matthew	Himself	Short film
2013	Getting Go: The Go Doc Project	Go	
2016	Sock Job	Young Man	
2016	Mess	Mike	TV mini series (3 episodes)
2018	Hurricane Bianca: From Russia with Hate	Security Guard	
2019	Wig	Himself	Documentary
2019	The MEN	Matthew / The Motorcycle Cop	TV series (7 episodes)
2020	Slag Wars: The Next Destroyer	Himself	Reality TV series (4 episodes)
2021	Iconic Justice	Bailiff Matthew Camp	TV mini series (6 episodes)
2021	Call Me Mother	Himself	Mini-challenge guest in Episode 7
2022	Hot Haus	Himself	Reality TV series
