= Kiss Me, Kill Me =

2015 film by Casper Andreas

- Original movie poster
- Directed by: Casper Andreas
- Written by: David Michael Barrett
- Produced by: Casper Andreas; David Michael Barrett
- Starring: Van Hansis; Gale Harold; Brianna Brown; Yolonda Ross; Craig Robert Young; Jai Rodriguez; Matthew Ludwinski; Kit Williamson
- Cinematography: Rainer Lipski
- Edited by: Andrew Gust
- Music by: Jonathan Dinerstein
- Production company: Spellbound Productions
- Distributed by: Embrem Entertainment
- Release date: September 18, 2015 (Reeling)
- Running time: 100 minutes
- Country: United States
- Language: English

Kiss Me, Kill Me is a 2015 American neo-noir mystery thriller film directed by Casper Andreas and written by David Michael Barrett, who both produced under their banner, Spellbound Productions. The film follows Dusty (Van Hansis) who, while confronting his unfaithful boyfriend, blacks out. When he comes to, his boyfriend Stephen (Gale Harold) has been murdered, and Dusty is the prime suspect. Kiss Me, Kill Me had its world premiere on September 18, 2015, at Reeling: The Chicago LGBTQ+ International Film Festival, which featured the film as its Spotlight Selection.

== Plot ==
Stephen Redding is a successful reality television producer with a big house in the hills and a trophy boyfriend, Dusty Young. But at Stephen's birthday party, Dusty discovers he has been having an affair with another man, Craigery. Humiliated, Dusty leaves the party, walks down to a convenience store. Stephen follows; trying to explain the affair is over, but out of nowhere—Dusty sees a flash—and blacks out.

When he comes to, Dusty learns Stephen was murdered and he's the prime suspect. LAPD Detectives Annette Riley and Noah Santos question him. But Dusty cannot remember what happened. However, West Hollywood is filled with suspects: an unstable lawyer, a couples’ therapist, a jealous ex, a sketchy best friend, a resentful lesbian couple, and a drag queen hypnotist.

With the police closing in, he must remember what happened, put the pieces of the puzzle together, regardless where the truth leads, even if it means he did kill Stephen.

== Cast ==
- Van Hansis as Dusty
- Gale Harold as Stephen (credited as Gale M. Harold III)
- Brianna Brown as Amanda
- Yolonda Ross as Det. Riley
- Craig Robert Young as Jeffrey
- Jai Rodriguez as Det. Santos
- Matthew Ludwinski as Craigery
- Kit Williamson as Travis (also co-producer)
- D.J. "Shangela" Pierce as Jasmine
- Jackie Monahan as Danielle
- Allison Lane as Lori (also co-producer)
- Michael Maize as Albert
- Jonathan Lisecki as Kevin
- Deborah S. Craig as Donna
- Casper Andreas as Dr. Winters
- Katie Walder as Susan Lynwood

== Casting ==
Producers Casper Andreas and David Michael Barrett cast the film with actors well known to LGBT audiences. Gale Harold, who plays Stephen, was the star of the Showtime series Queer as Folk. This film marks the first time he has played a gay character since the series concluded. Van Hansis, four-time Emmy Award nominee from As the World Turns and star of Logo's series EastSiders, is the film's leading man, Dusty. Many cast members in Kiss Me, Kill Me also appear in Eastsiders, including Brianna Brown (from Devious Maids), Jai Rodriguez (Emmy Award-winning star of Queer Eye for the Straight Guy), Jonathan Lisecki (writer-director-actor of Gayby) and Kit Williamson, a co-producer on the film, who created Eastsiders. Drag queen Shangela (D.J. Pierce), known for RuPaul's Drag Race, plays hypnotist Jasmine. Both Matthew Ludwinski and Allison Lane previously worked with Andreas, appearing in his film Going Down in LA-LA Land, and Deborah S. Craig appeared in Barrett's film Bad Actress. Notable cameos in the film include Katie Walder as television news reporter Susan Lynwood, and YouTube stars Will Shepherd and R.J. Aguiar who appear in the funeral scene. Pop singer SIRPAUL is featured in the nightclub scene singing his single "Kiss Me, Kill Me", and Andreas plays Dr. Winters.

== Production ==
Initial funding for Kiss Me, Kill Me came through a crowdfunding campaign on Kickstarter, managed by producers Casper Andreas and David Michael Barrett. The successful campaign ran from October 6 to November 5, 2014, with 909 backers from all over the world. In the campaign, Andreas and Barrett explain the necessity for crowdsourcing as a viable means for producing LGBT content. They also credit their love of Alfred Hitchcock- and Agatha Christie-style murder mysteries as the inspiration for this film. Production began on January 7, 2015, for a 17-day shoot, predominantly in West Hollywood, California, where the film is set. The picture was shot on the Epic Red Dragon Camera by cinematographer, Rainer Lipski, edited by Andrew Gust, and original soundtrack was composed by Jonathan Dinerstein. Fredrik Malmberg, best known for producing the Conan the Barbarian reboot, is the film's executive producer. The Saul Bass-inspired animated opening titles sequence was created by graphic artist Scott McPherson. The film's taglines are "West Hollywood Is Murder" and "Coming Soon... with a BANG!"

== Filming locations ==
Notable filming locations: Pink Dot, Here Lounge, West Hollywood, Andaz Hotel, West Hollywood, Odd Fellows Cemetery, Central City Stages, and other locations around Los Angeles.

== Awards ==
- Audience Choice Award, 2015, QCinema Fort Worth's Gay & Lesbian International Film Festival
- Best Ensemble, 2015, QCinema Fort Worth's Gay & Lesbian International Film Festival
- Best Feature Film, 2016 QFest New Jersey LGBT Film & Digital Media Festival, Asbury Park, New Jersey
- Best Feature Film, 2016 FilmOut San Diego
- Best Ensemble, 2016 FilmOut San Diego
- Best Actor (Van Hansis), 2016 FilmOut San Diego
- Best Screenplay (David Michael Barrett), 2016 FilmOut San Diego
- Best Cinematography (Rainer Lipski), 2016 FilmOut San Diego
- Best Music/Soundtrack (Jonathan Dinerstein), 2016 FilmOut San Diego

== Distribution ==
Kiss Me, Kill Me was released on DVD and Video on Demand through Embrem Entertainment on December 7, 2016. It is available to buy or stream on Amazon.com, iTunes, Vimeo, Google Play and other platforms.
