= Babes in the Wood (musical) =

- Lyrics: Rick Besoyan
- Book: Rick Besoyan
- Basis: A Midsummer Night's Dream
- Premiere: December 28, 1964: Orpheum Theatre

Babes in the Wood is a 1964 Off-Broadway musical adaptation of A Midsummer Night's Dream. The show's book and lyrics are by Rick Besoyan. It opened on December 28, 1964, at the Orpheum Theatre and closed on February 7, 1965.

== Production ==
In addition to writing the show, Besoyan also directed the production, with musical direction by Natalie Charlson. Sandy Farber and Aaron Schroeder produced the show. Ralph Beaumont provided choreography, and set design and lighting were done by Paul Morrison. Howard Barker designed the show's costumes.

== Songs ==
=== Act l ===
- This State of Affairs (Oberon, Robin Goodfellow)
- Titania's Philosophy (Titania)
- A Lover Waits (Oberon)
- The Gossip Song (Helena)
- I'm Not for You (Demetrius)
- I'm Not for You (Reprise) (Helena, Demetrius)
- Mother (Bottom)
- Old Fashioned Girl (Bottom, Goodfellow)
- Love Is Lovely (Lysander, Hermia)
- Babes in the Wood (Goodfellow)
- Love Is Lovely (Reprise) (Lysander, Helena)
- Finale (Company)

=== Act ll ===
- Opening (Company)
- Anyone Can Make a Mistake (Goodfellow)
- Cavorting (Titania, Bottom)
- There's a Girl (Oberon, Demetrius)
- There's a Girl (reprise) (Demetrius)
- I'm Not for You (reprise) (Lysander)
- Little Tear (Hermia)
- Babes in the Wood (reprise) (Goodfellow)
- Helena's Solution (Helena, Lysander, Demetrius)
- Helena (Demetrius, Lysander)
- Midsummer Night (Oberon, Titania)
- Moon Madness (Titania, Bottom)
- A Lover Waits (reprise) (Oberon)
- The Alphabet Song (Titania, Hermia, Helena)
- FInale (Company)

== Cast ==
	1964 Broadway
Helena	Ruth Buzzi
Demetrius	Danny Carroll
Hermia	Joleen Fodor
Titania	Carol Glade
Oberon	Richard Charles Hoh
Bottom	Kenneth McMilan
An Addition	Edward Miller
Lysander	Don Stewart
Robin Goodfellow	Elmarie Wendel

== Reception ==
The New York Times criticized the show, saying it "manages to rob his source of all enchantment", and although its music was enjoyable, the songs added nothing to the plot. The view of the musical as "pleasant but forgettable" seems to have been shared by other theater critics as well.
