= Edward Miller (playwright) =

American actor, playwright, and producer

Edward Miller is an American actor, playwright, and producer. Several of his original plays have been produced off-Broadway, and he has appeared in a number of independent films. He has most often collaborated with filmmaker Casper Andreas. Miller appeared in and executive-produced Andreas' 2009 film The Big Gay Musical.

== Early life and education ==
Miller is originally from Memphis, Tennessee. He attended the University of Memphis and studied music education.

== Career ==
Miller has appeared in several New York off-Broadway theater productions, as well as films.

=== Filmography ===
- A Four Letter Word (2008) Hot guy outside bar
- The Big Gay Musical (2009) Stage manager
- Kiss Me, Kill Me (2015) Bar patron/paramedic

=== Theater ===
- Crossover, (Morton) 2003 Jan Hus Playhouse
- Revolution Row, (Terrence) 2005 Sande Shurin Theatre
- Make It So, 2008 Theater For the New City
- A Promise Best Kept, 2012 Theater For the New City
- No Ransom To Be Paid, 2017 Pangea Supper Club

== Other projects ==
Miller also executive-produced an original musical by Erik Ransom entitled More Than All the World in 2016. It premiered at Theater for the New City.
