= David Michael Barrett =

American author, screenwriter, and producer

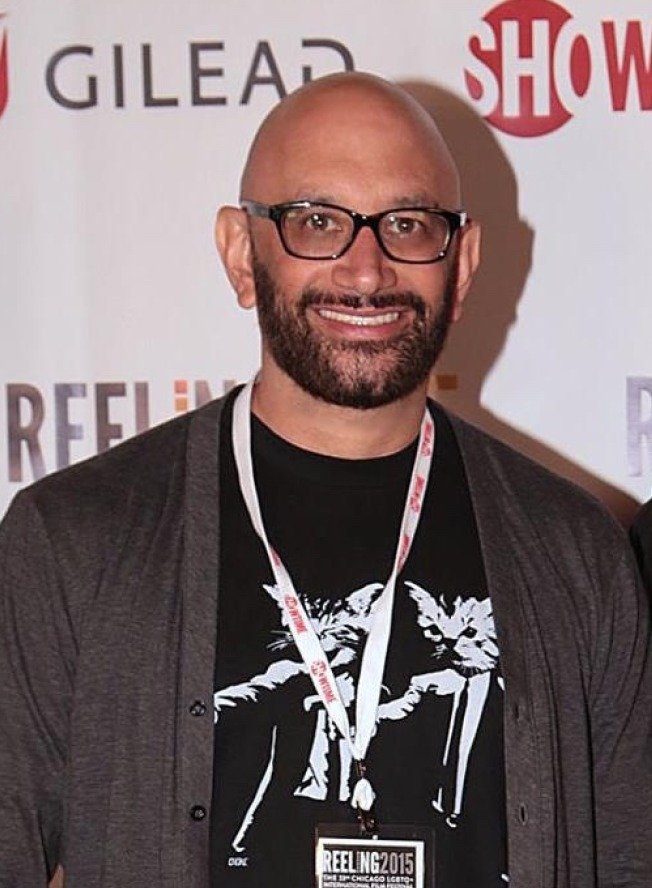
- Born: April 3, 1971 (age 54); Seattle, Washington
- Education: California State University, Northridge
- Occupations: Screenwriter, film producer
- Years active: 1999–present
- Spouse: Mark Peters (m. 2004)

David Michael Barrett (born April 3, 1971) is an American screenwriter and film producer in Los Angeles, California.

Best known for his films Bad Actress, Such Good People and Kiss Me, Kill Me, his play Brentwood was featured in Noah Wyle's Blank Theatre Company's Living Room Series of new works. He is an alumnus of Outfest's Screenwriting Lab, and has been a mentor at the International Academy of Film and Television, where he is on the advisory board. Prior to writing, Barrett spent over a dozen years in drama development at Warner Bros. TV, where he worked with writer/producers James Duff The Closer, Deborah Joy LeVine The New Adventures of Lois & Clark, among others.

== Screenwriter ==
=== Bad Actress (2011) ===
Bad Actress is a dark comedy about has-been TV star, Alyssa Rampart-Pillage (Beth Broderick), whose career is restarted when she's accused of murdering her husband, Bernie (Chris Mulkey). The film premiered at the Miami International Film Festival in March 2011 and was later showcased at various film festivals, including the Cleveland International Film Festival. Beth Broderick's performance earned her the Best Actress award at the New York Independent Film Festival, and the film received the "10 Degrees Hotter Award" for Best Picture at the Valley Film Festival. The film is distributed by Strand Releasing.

=== Such Good People (2014) ===
A screwball comedy, Such Good People tells the story of Richard (Michael Urie) and Alex (Randy Harrison) who, while house-sitting for rich humanitarian friends, find a huge stash of cash in the residence. When the homeowners die in a car crash, altruism and greed collide as Richard and Alex try to decide what to do with the money. Directed by Stewart Wade. Breaking Glass Pictures is the film's distributor.

=== Kiss Me, Kill Me (2015) ===
A contemporary film noir psychological thriller, Kiss Me, Kill Me is a murder mystery about Dusty (Van Hansis) who blacks-out while confronting his unfaithful boyfriend. When he comes to, his boyfriend Stephen (Gale Harold) has been murdered, and he's the prime suspect. Directed by Casper Andreas. In June 2016, Kiss Me, Kill Me screened opening night at FilmOut San Diego, where picture won six awards, including Best Feature and David Michael Barrett won Best Screenplay.

== Producer ==
In addition to producing Such Good People, Kiss Me, Kill Me, and executive producing Bad Actress, in 2016 Barrett co-produced the award-winning documentary Forbidden: Undocumented and Queer in Rural America.

=== Forbidden: Undocumented and Queer in Rural America (2016) ===
The feature film documentary, directed by Tiffany Rhynard and edited by Heather Matthews, tells the story of Moises Serrano, an undocumented and queer young man who grew up in rural North Carolina. Picture had its world premiere at Outfest where it won the Freedom Award for Best Documentary, 2016, then went on to win the Southern Poverty Law Center’s Social Justice Film award at the 2016 Charlotte Film Festival.

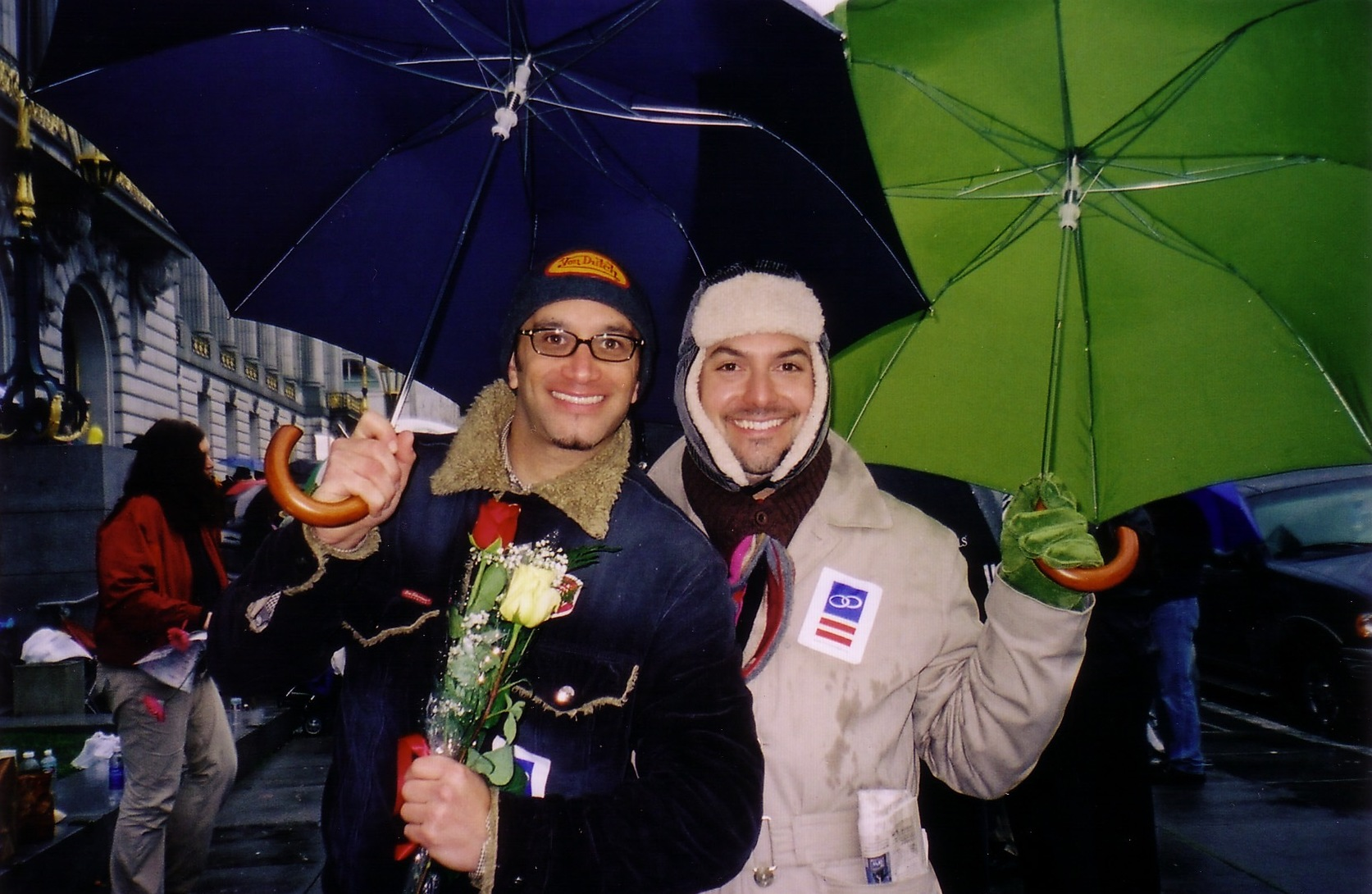
Newlyweds David Michael Barrett & Mark Peters, Feb. 16, 2004

== Personal life ==
David Michael Barrett was born on April 3, 1971, in Seattle, Washington, to Ashkenazic Jewish parents, Ronald Barrett, an entrepreneur, and Judy Barrett, a real estate professional. He grew up in the San Fernando Valley neighborhood of Northridge. During his high school years, he was active in Jewish youth group BBYO: the B'nai B'rith Youth Organization, where he served as S'gan (vice-president) for the Southern California region. In college, he studied literature, screenwriting, and film production at California State University, Northridge, where he graduated summa cum laude, and was an active member of Zeta Beta Tau. He married Mark Peters, a popular QVC host, on Feb. 16, 2004. Barrett's chronicle of their wedding in the historic San Francisco 2004 same-sex weddings inspired the publication of a non-fiction collection of essays: Hitched! Wedding Stories from San Francisco City Hall, edited by Cheryl Dumesnil, published by Da Capo Press (September 21, 2005). Barrett and Peters live in the Silverlake neighborhood of Los Angeles.
