= Violet Tendencies =

- Directed by: Casper Andreas
- Written by: Jesse Archer
- Produced by: Casper Andreas; Jesse Archer
- Starring: Mindy Cohn; Marcus Patrick
- Cinematography: Timothy Naylor
- Edited by: Craig Cobb
- Music by: Michael Barry
- Distributed by: Embrem Entertainment
- Release date: November 19, 2010
- Running time: 99 minutes
- Country: United States
- Language: English

Violet Tendencies is a 2010 romantic comedy film directed by Casper Andreas, written by Jesse Archer, and starring Mindy Cohn and Marcus Patrick. The film was released in the United States on November 19, 2010, and came out on video on demand in March 2011 and DVD on May 24, 2011.

== Premise ==
Violet (Cohn) is forty, fabulous, and the ultimate fag hag. Fed up with being single, she decides to distance herself from her gay friends in order to find a straight boyfriend.

== Cast ==
Actor	Role
Mindy Cohn	Violet
Marcus Patrick	Zeus
Jesse Archer	Luke
Samuel Whitten	Riley
Casper Andreas	Markus
Kim Allen	Salome
Adrian Armas	Darian
Armand Anthony	Vern
Dennis Hearn	Bradleigh
Andrea Cirie	Donna
Sophia Lamar	Larice
Hilary Elliot	Marjorie Max
Margret R.R. Echeverria	Audrey
Shari Albert	Ashley
Michael Scott	Stephen Miser
Michelle Akeley	Darian's Receptionist
Christopher L. Graves	Mike
John-Patrick Driscoll	The Mailman
Michael Cornacchia	Donnie the Waiter
Jonathan Chang	Andre
Brandon Gill	J Flame
Ben Pamies	Gerald
J.R. Rolley	Derek
Sonja Rzepski	Jenny
Howard Feller	Homeless Man
Fredrick Ford	Darian's Trick
Kohl Beck	Beer Can Dan
Sal Blandino	Clipboard Fundraiser 1
Ali Mroczkowski	Clipboard Fundraiser 3
Ryan Turner	Clipboard Fundraiser 2
