= Such Good People =

- Directed by: Stewart Wade
- Screenplay by: David Michael Barrett
- Story by: David Michael Barrett & Greg Sterling
- Produced by: David Avallone; David Michael Barrett; Stewart Wade
- Starring: Michael Urie Randy Harrison; James Urbaniak; Scott Wolf; Ana Ortiz; Carrie Wiita; Rick Overton; Kate Reinders; Lance Bass; Tom Lenk; Mitch Silpa; Alec Mapa; Drew Droege; Tania Gunadi; Kee Chan Forrest Wheeler
- Cinematography: Pierluigi Malavasi
- Edited by: David Avallone
- Music by: Jonathan Dinerstein
- Production company: Such Good Productions
- Distributed by: Breaking Glass Entertainment
- Release dates: May 9, 2014 (MiFo); April 14, 2015
- Running time: 96 minutes
- Country: United States
- Language: English

Such Good People is a 2014 American feature film comedy from director by Stewart Wade, screenwriter David Michael Barrett, and editor David Avallone, who produced the film under their banner, Such Good Productions. The picture had its world premiere at MiFo: Miami Fort Lauderdale LGBT Film Festival on May 9, 2014, at the historic Colony Theater on Lincoln Road.

Such Good People tells the story of Richard (Michael Urie) and Alex (Randy Harrison) who, while house-sitting for rich humanitarian friends, find a huge stash of cash in the residence. When the homeowners die in a car crash, altruism and greed collide as Richard and Alex try to decide what to do with the money.

== Plot ==
Young couple Richard (Michael Urie) and Alex (Randy Harrison) want what everyone wants: career, kids and a gorgeous home in L.A. But it all seems so impossible until they crash a party at Edendale, their dream house, owned by Jake (Scott Wolf) and Chloe (Kate Reinders), who are hosting a fundraiser for the orphans of Bhutan. Richard and Alex hit it off with the hosts, and while house-sitting for them, discover a secret room filled with a million in cash.

When Jake and Chloe die in a "rickshaw accident" overseas, Richard and Alex worry the cash might not go to the orphans, so they break into Edendale and take the money. They earnestly try to donate the money to Jigme Wangchuck (Alec Mapa), the deputy ambassador of the Embassy of Bhutan, and his assistant Priti Khagda (Tania Gunadi). But the Embassy officials, thinking they're being set up, refuse the money. So Richard and Alex deposit the cash, find another charity, and end up writing a check to "The Porpoise Purpose," headed by Stuart Hendron (Lance Bass) and his assistant Olivier (Mitch Silpa).

Just then, they learn from their Realtor, Logan, (Tom Lenk), that Edendale is now on the market. They really want it but have given the money to the porpoise charity—so they stop payment on the check and use the money as down payment on the house, intending to repay the charity by taking out a second mortgage once escrow closes.

But tough yet savvy LAPD Detective Dianne Kershman (Ana Ortiz) sees things differently. She tells Richard and Alex that Jake and Chloe were in fact murdered. Worried the killers must be after the money, they panic and confide in Alex's half-sister, Paige (Carrie Wiita) and her husband, Cooper (James Urbaniak) who are therapists and RX drug dealers. Paige and Cooper realize the money Jake had owed them somehow ended up with Richard and Alex, whom they convince to take out the second mortgage—in cash. And after an ill-fated labradoodle kidnapping and hostage stand-off, Paige and Cooper discover the money hidden in the house and take it.

Shattered, Richard and Alex do in fact sell Edendale. They repay the Porpoise Purpose, as Det. Kershman had pretty much guaranteed jail-time if they didn't. Richard and Alex then learn from Jake and Chloe's questionable Buddhist lawyer Sidney (Rick Overton) that they were in possession of a rare Bhutanese artifact of Jake and Chloe's, the Kuntu Zangpo, worth $10 million, which Paige and Cooper also took. They interrupt Paige and Cooper's black market sale to art dealer Clay Hampton (Drew Droege), and get them—and Sidney—to confess. Det. Kershman rushes in and arrests Paige and Cooper for, among other things, drug dealing. She thanks Richard and Alex for helping with the sting.

The chastened couple flies to Bhutan and returns the $10 million tchotchke to the orphanage, run by Buddhist monk Chana Dorje (Kee Chan) and they finally get their wish—they adopt a young boy, Kuenphay (Forrest Wheeler). They couldn't be happier. Well, maybe they could—if they had a house.

== Cast ==
- Michael Urie as Richard
- Randy Harrison as Alex
- James Urbaniak as Cooper
- Scott Wolf as Jake
- Ana Ortiz as Det. Kershman
- Carrie Wiita as Paige
- Rick Overton as Sidney
- Kate Reinders as Chloe
- Lance Bass as Stuart
- Tom Lenk as Logan
- Mitch Silpa as Olivier
- Alec Mapa as Jigme
- Drew Droege as Clay
- Tania Gunadi as Priti
- Adam Huss as Officer Cross
- Kee Chan as Chana Dorje
- Forrest Wheeler as Little Kuenlay/Little Kuenphay

== Casting ==
Producers David Avallone, David Michael Barrett and Stewart Wade cast the movie with actors well known to LGBT audiences. Michael Urie, who plays “Richard,” was one of the stars of Ugly Betty. Several cast members of Such Good People appeared on Ugly Betty, including Ana Ortiz (also from Devious Maids), comedian Alec Mapa (who also appeared in Stewart Wade's film Tru Loved), and Broadway star Kate Reinders. Randy Harrison, who plays “Alex,” is best known for starring in the Showtime series, Queer as Folk. Other cast members well known to LGBT audiences are Lance Bass, (former member of NSYNC), Mitch Silpa, (Bridesmaids), Tom Lenk (Buffy the Vampire Slayer), and, Drew Droege. Additionally, the movie has comedians James Urbaniak (Henry Fool), Carrie Wiita, Tania Gunadi and improv performer Rick Overton (Groundhog Day). Forrest Wheeler from Fresh Off the Boat and Scott Wolf from Party of Five, join Kee Chan (Star Wars: Episode III - Revenge of the Sith) to round out the cast. Notable cameos include: Adam Huss (Power), Adam Bucci (Eastsiders), Jason-Shane Scott (One Life to Live), Jeff Marchelletta, Ryan Spahn, John Halbach (Eastsiders), Allison Lane (Going Down in LA-LA Land) and Mario Diaz (Club King). Editor-producer David Avallone also makes a cameo, in the role of “Sketchy Man.”

== Production ==
After a Kickstarter campaign to raise initial funds, Such Good People went into production on May 22, 2013 for a 16-day shoot in Los Angeles. In addition to director Stewart Wade, screenwriter David Michael Barrett and editor David Avallone, other key members of the production team were cinematographer Pierluigi Malavasi, composer Jonathan Dinerstein, and line producer Christine Triebel and Production Manager was Nicole Ettinger. Production Designer was Roman Udalov, Art Direction was by Dare Williams, Costume Design was by Cari Avila, Hair and Makeup was by Kat Laskey. The "Kuntu Zangpo" was created and designed by Harwood Lee, of Commercial Costumes. The house prominently featured in the movie, "Edendale," is in the Silverlake neighborhood of Los Angeles, and is owned by writer/producer David Michael Barrett.

== Distribution ==
At the conclusion of the worldwide festival run of Such Good People, the film sold to Breaking Glass Entertainment who are distributing the movie on DVD, Blu-ray as well as streaming online streaming platforms Netflix, Hulu, Amazon, iTunes, Vudu, YouTube and Google Play Movies and others all over the world.
