= Matthew Ludwinski =

American actor, model, and writer (born 1980)

- Born: September 22, 1980 (age 46); Manassas, Virginia, U.S.
- Other name: Matt Ludwinski
- Occupations: Actor; model; writer
- Years active: 2006–present
- Modeling information
- Height: 6 ft 1 in (185 cm)
- Hair color: Dirty blonde
- Eye color: Blue
- Agency: Wilhelmina (LA)

Matthew Ludwinski (born 22 September 1980) is an American actor, model, and writer. His notable film appearances include in Going Down in LA-LA Land (2011), Seek (2014), Kiss Me, Kill Me (2015), and The Good Waiter (2016), the latter of which he wrote.

== Early life ==
Ludwinski was born on September 22, 1980, in Manassas, Virginia. He graduated from Catholic University of America.

== Career ==
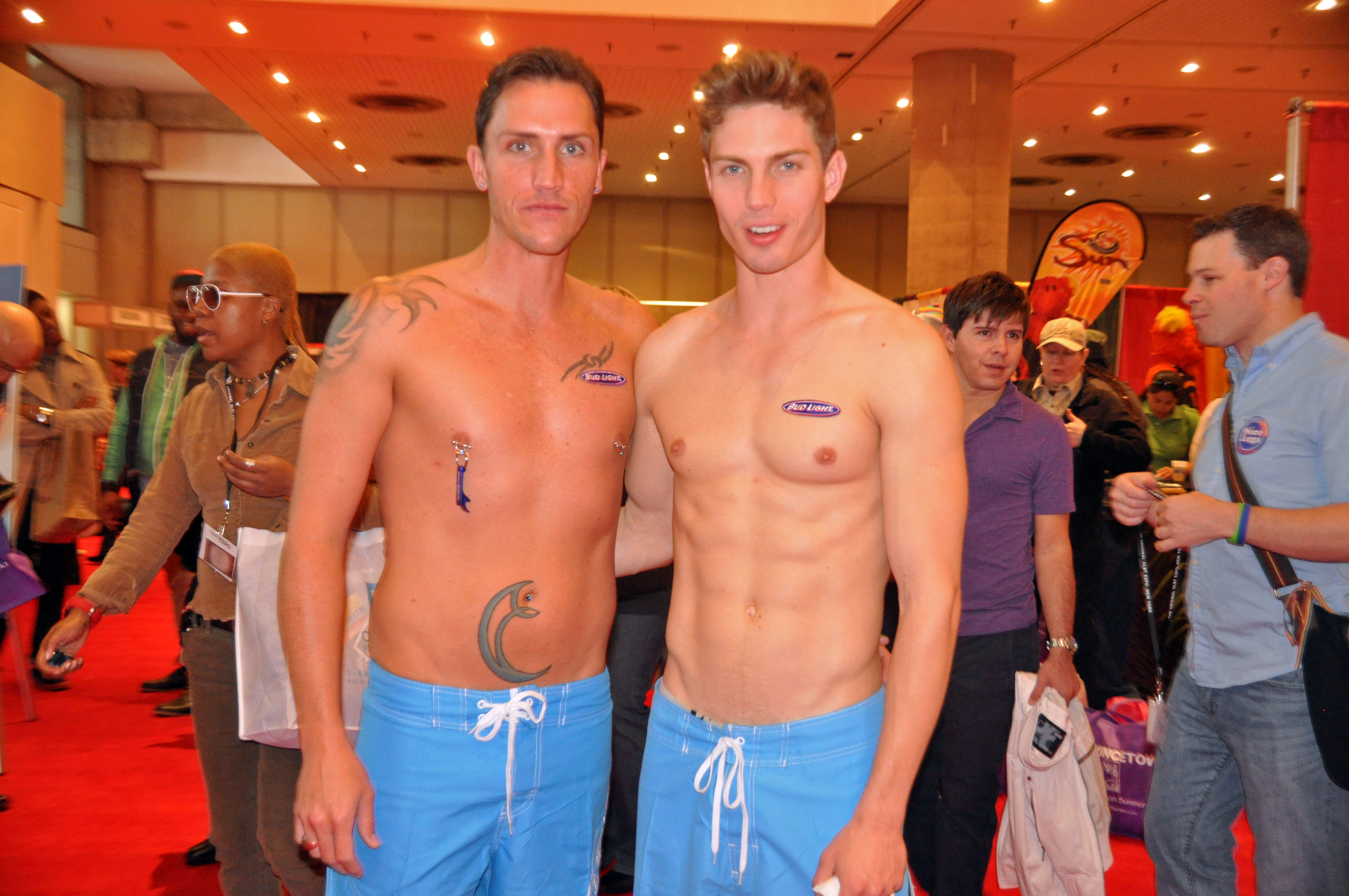
Ludwinski (right) at the Gay Life Expo in the Javits Center

In 2010, Ludwinski appeared in the off-Broadway show Naked Boys Singing in Provincetown, Massachusetts.

He has modeled for a number of brands including The Underwear Expert and Body Aware Underwear, as well having spreads in publications including Mate, Proof, Passport, Vulcan Online, and NEXT.

Ludwinski has appeared in promotions for Grindr and Moovz.

== Filmography ==
=== Film ===
Title	Year	Role	Director	Notes	Ref.
The Sun and the Daughter	2006	Gilen Lancaster	Guillermo Barreira Pérez	Short film	
Between Love and Goodbye	2008	Rob	Casper Andreas		
The Cornstarch Gizmo	2008	Businessman with banana	Anthony Saladino	Short film	
The Red Stitches	2008	Mark	Todd Goings	Short film	
Counter Intelligence	2008		Josell Ramos	Short film	
The Battle of Pussy Willow Creek	2010	Jonathan Franklin Hale	Wendy Jo Cohen		
The Recollection: The Sweetest Dream	2010		Ryan J. Park	Short film	
Going Down in LA-LA Land	2011	Adam Zeller	Casper Andreas		
Little Consequences	2012	Naked man	C. Jay Cox	Short film	
Seek	2014	Jordan	Eric Henry		
Kiss Me, Kill Me	2015	Craigery Webb	Casper Andreas	FilmOut Audience Award for Best Ensemble (shared with cast)	
By the Grace of God	2017	Special thanks	Ryan Katzenbach	Short film	
The Good Waiter	2018	Drew	George Bamber	Short film; also writer and producer	

=== Television ===
Title	Year	Role	Notes	Ref.
Montreal Boy	2014	Montreal boy	LOGO series	
See U Next Tuesday	2015	Bugle man	Episode: "Blowing Boogie Bugle Man From Company G"	
Girls Like Magic	2017	Shirtless waiter	Guest appearance	

== Theatre credits ==
Title	Year	Role	Notes	Ref.
Naked Boys Singing			Off-Broadway in Provincetown, Massachusetts	
