= Little Mary Sunshine =

1959 musical

- London Cast Recording
- Music: Rick Besoyan
- Lyrics: Rick Besoyan
- Book: Rick Besoyan
- Productions: 1959 Off-Broadway; 1962 West End

Little Mary Sunshine is a musical that parodies old-fashioned operettas and musicals. The book, music, and lyrics are by Rick Besoyan. The original Off-Broadway production premiered November 18, 1959 at the Orpheum Theatre in New York City's East Village. Staying in the neighborhood, it moved to the Player's Theatre on June 21, 1961, then, finally, to the Cherry Lane Theatre on March 21, 1962. Closing was Sept. 2, 1962. Combined run was 1,143 performances. It was seen briefly in a West End production in 1962 and has become a popular show for amateur and semi-professional groups in the United States and elsewhere.

== Background ==
Little Mary Sunshine was conceived and staged as an affectionate sendup of operettas and old-fashioned musicals, the genre of Victor Herbert, Rudolf Friml, and Sigmund Romberg. It also has allusions to Gilbert and Sullivan, Irving Berlin, Jerome Kern, Noël Coward, Rodgers and Hammerstein, and other musical theatre composers and lyricists. Its "Indians" and "forest rangers" (thinly disguised Mounties) allude to Friml's Rose-Marie, as does the song "Colorado Love Call". Numerous other, less obvious details point, in a humorous and lighthearted manner, to other operettas and musicals — sometimes specifically, sometimes in terms of general categories of songs or characters.

The 1954 Marc Blitzstein adaptation of The Threepenny Opera, which ran for six years, showed that musicals could be profitable off-Broadway in a small-scale, small orchestra format. This was confirmed in 1959 when a revival of Jerome Kern and P. G. Wodehouse's Leave It to Jane ran for more than two years. The 1959–1960 Off-Broadway season included a dozen musicals and revues including Little Mary Sunshine, The Fantasticks, which ran for over 40 years, and Ernest in Love, a musicalization of Oscar Wilde's 1895 hit The Importance of Being Earnest.

== Productions ==
The original Off-Broadway production opened on November 18, 1959, at the Orpheum Theatre in New York City's East Village and was directed and choreographed by Ray Harrison and featured Eileen Brennan in the title role, with William Graham as Captain Warington, and John McMartin as Corporal Jester. It closed in September 1962 after a run of 1,143 performances. Two pianos supplied the musical accompaniment. The musical acquired orchestral accompaniment when Capitol Records chose to feature it as that firm's first original cast recording of an off-Broadway show.

London's original West End production of the show — in some respects the first full stage presentation — was directed by Paddy Stone and starred Patricia Routledge, Terence Cooper, Bernard Cribbins and Ed Bishop. It opened on May 17, 1962 at the Comedy Theatre but was compared unfavourably with The Boy Friend and closed after only 42 performances.

Critics of this musical have objected that it stereotypes and demeans Native Americans.

== Characters ==
- Captain "Big Jim" Warington, handsome Captain of the Forest Rangers: baritone - Primarily, Jim represents Rose-Marie's Jim Kenyon, although he gets his Ranger (Mountie) uniform from Sergeant Malone. (In fact, in spite of his rank, in some productions he wears sergeant's stripes). Generically, Jim also represents other operetta leaders of men (and singers of rallying songs) such as François Villon, leader of the Paris rabble in The Vagabond King ("Song of the Vagabonds"); Robert Misson, leader of the New Orleans antiroyalty men in The New Moon ("Stout-hearted Men); and the Red Shadow, leader of the Riffs in The Desert Song ("The Riff Song").
- "Little Mary Sunshine" (Mary Potts), proprietress of the Colorado Inn: soprano (called "Little Merry Sunshine" by the Kadotas) - Mary is primarily a caricature of Rose-Marie's Rose-Marie La Flamme, but also generically represents operetta heroines, the sweethearts of the leaders of men. In the London production, Patricia Routledge, who had an ample figure, brought out aspects of Mary's role linking her with "Little Buttercup" from HMS Pinafore. In practice, to emphasize the humor, Mary is usually played by a character actress rather than a conventional "leading lady".
- Madame Ernestine von Liebedich, an elderly opera singer: contralto - Ernestine resembles Sarah Millick, heroine of Coward's Bitter Sweet, and like her prototype has "sweet memories" of Vienna that "across the years . . . come to" her—words from the song "I'll See You Again". The name Liebedich recalls Edvard Grieg's composition "Ich Liebe Dich" ("I Love You"). Her name also resembles that of opera singer Ernestine Schumann-Heink, on whom she may be partially based.
- Corporal "Billy" Jester, a Forest Ranger: tenor or high baritone - Billy and his girlfriend Nancy, the show's comedic bickering lovers, closely resemble Ado Annie and Will Parker from Rodgers and Hammerstein's Oklahoma!.
- Nancy Twinkle, the show's soubrette - Like Ado Annie, Nancy loves her man, yet is perhaps even fonder of men in general.
- Chief Brown Bear, chief of the Kadota (anagram of Dakota) Indians - Brown Bear is based on Chief Sitting Bull, from Irving Berlin's Annie Get Your Gun. Both characters are admirable - wise, restrained, and generous - and both are father figures to their respective heroines.
- Yellow Feather, Brown Bear's rogue son - The show's villain lampoons Rose-Marie's villainous Black Eagle. Both have two-part names whose first word is a color and whose second word relates to birds. Yellow Feather's conversion to a flag waving patriot in the finale parallels the reform of the pirates in Gilbert and Sullivan's The Pirates of Penzance.
- Fleet Foot, an Indian guide - Fleet Foot is elderly and no longer able to live up to his name.
- General Oscar Fairfax, Ret., an elderly Washington diplomat who likes to flirt with younger ladies - Oscar's bringing gifts for the young ladies and asking to be called "Uncle" recalls Uncle (or "Godfather") Drosselmeyer from Tchaikovsky's ballet The Nutcracker - although of course the aging roue is also a stock character in operetta and old-fashioned musical comedy.
- Young Ladies from the Eastchester Finishing School: Cora, Henrietta, Gwendolyn, Blanche, Maud, and Mabel (who has no lines). (Millicent added in the vocal score)
- Forest Rangers: Pete, Slim, Tex, Buster, Hank, and Tom (Chuck added in the vocal score)

== Synopsis ==
Time: Early in "this" century i.e., the 20th century
Place: The Colorado Inn (shades of the White Horse Inn), high in the Rocky Mountains (standing in for the Tyrol)

Act I

Little Mary Sunshine, foster daughter of Chief Brown Bear of the Kadota tribe, is in trouble. The government is threatening to foreclose the mortgage on her Colorado Inn, located on land that is subject to a dispute between Brown Bear and Uncle Sam. On Mary's advice Brown Bear is engaged in peaceful legal proceedings rather than warfare to establish his rights.

Captain Jim and his Forest Rangers arrive. They are searching for the disruptive Indian Yellow Feather. Yellow Feather's "crimes" are actually not murder and pillage but indiscriminate hunting and irresponsible use of fire in the forest, but he is nonetheless a villain of the deepest dye, who has threatened to "have his way" with Mary. Jim woos Mary, after which the two get well-sung advice from Mary's opera star guest Mme. Ernestine Liebedich.

Some young ladies from the Eastchester Finishing School (implicitly in New York or Pennsylvania, which have Westchesters) are also Inn guests. While they entertain themselves playing croquet and swinging on swings, the Rangers come upon them. The Rangers' flirting elicits an immediate enthusiastic response, and love blooms once more as they joyfully sing together.

Later, the young ranger Billy and his girlfriend Nancy squabble about Nancy's appetite for other men. Jim and Mary return to the spotlight. Mary reveals her "Little Buttercup" secret: Yellow Feather is really Brown Bear's son, long believed dead. As the first act ends, Jim and his aged Indian guide Fleet Foot set off to capture Yellow Feather.

Act II

Mary holds a garden party featuring the Eastchester ladies and the Rangers. Retired General Oscar Fairfax shows up, bringing a box of gifts for the ladies. Taking command of the Rangers in Jim's absence, he directs the Rangers to depart, find Jim, and bring him back. Fairfax now has the ladies to himself. But his interest shifts to Mme. Ernestine when he meets her and learns they have something in common: in their youth, both spent happy days in Vienna.

Mary goes to her garden. Yellow Feather sneaks in, finds her there, ties her to a tree, and threatens to debase her. Jim returns just in time and wrests a knife from the villain. The Rangers, who have surrounded the Inn, capture Yellow Feather as he tries to escape.

The rest of the cast then emerges. Fairfax has good news: the courts have upheld Brown Bear's claim to the disputed land, a mere one-fourth of Colorado. The chief gives Mary the Inn's land and dedicates the rest for a national park, a place the Rangers can call home. In the finale, a miraculously reformed Yellow Feather reappears, waving a large American flag. Jim and Mary, Billy and Nancy, Oscar and Ernestine, and several Ranger-Eastchester couples seem headed for the altar.

== Music ==
The musical numbers for Little Mary Sunshine are appropriately tongue-in-cheek: any triteness and corn (and there is a good deal of both) is fully intended, rather than inadvertent. This is musical parody at a very high level.

Particularly memorable among the songs are the show's most conspicuously parodic song, "Colorado Love Call" ("Indian Love Call" revisited), which evokes memories of Nelson Eddy's duets with Jeanette MacDonald; the hopelessly optimistic "Look for a Sky of Blue"; the catchy yet schmaltzy tune "In Izzenschnooken on the Lovely Essenzook Zee"; the soft-shoe-styled "Once in a Blue Moon"; the lyrical waltzes "You're the Fairest Flower" and "Do You Ever Dream of Vienna?"; the comedy-lyric-laden "Mata Hari"; and especially the exaggerated triple-counterpoint medley "Playing Croquet", "Swinging", and "How Do You Do?" (three songs combined instead of the usual two).

Here is a list of the numbers:

Overture
Act I

- The Forest Rangers
- Little Mary Sunshine
- Look for a Sky of Blue
- You're the Fairest Flower
- In Izzenschnooken on the Lovely Essenzook Zee
- Playing Croquet
- Swinging
- How Do You Do?
- Tell a Handsome Stranger
- Once in a Blue Moon
- Colorado Love Call
- Every Little Nothing
- Finale ("What Has Happened?"; "Look for a Sky of Blue")

Act II

- Such a Merry Party
- Say "Uncle"
- Me a Heap Big Injun
- Naughty, Naughty Nancy
- Mata Hari
- Do You Ever Dream of Vienna?
- A Shell Game (pantomime)
- Coo Coo
- Finale ("The Forest Rangers"; "Look for a Sky of Blue")

== Song annotations ==
The songs in Little Mary Sunshine allude to earlier shows, their songs, and their characters.

- The Forest Rangers is a parody of "Tramp, tramp, tramp", from Victor Herbert's Naughty Marietta, although it also alludes less directly to the whole genre of "gallant warriors" songs, notably "The Mounties", from Friml's Rose-Marie; "Stout Hearted Men", from Romberg's The New Moon; "The Riff Song", from Romberg's The Desert Song; "Song of the Vagabonds", from Friml's The Vagabond King; and arguably even "March of the Toys", from Herbert's Babes in Toyland. The line "For there's always one more hill beyond the hill beyond the hill ... [six "hill" mentions]" apes the title of "There's a Hill Beyond a Hill", from Kern and Hammerstein's Music in the Air (Mandelbaum, CD 10). "The Forest Rangers" also echoes the Boy Scout Law ("A scout is trustworthy...") by giving the rangers nine of the twelve Scout Law attributes: "He's thoughtful and he's courteous and kind. He's reverent and brave. ... He's clean in soul and body and mind. He's cheerful, honest ["trustworthy"], thrifty and obedient."
- Little Mary Sunshine mimics the title song from Rose-Marie. Both songs are title songs, and both use the name of the play's heroine as the song title.
- Look for A Sky of Blue alludes to "Look for the Silver Lining", from Jerome Kern's Sally. "When e’er a cloud appears," is the first five words of both the first line of the chorus of "Sky of Blue" and the second line of the chorus of "Silver Lining".
- You're the Fairest Flower ["...An American Beauty Rose"] alludes particularly to two operetta songs with "Rose" in their titles – the title song from Friml's Rose-Marie and "Only a Rose", from Friml's The Vagabond King – but also alludes generally to other boy-serenades-girl love songs, such as the title song from Romberg's The Desert Song; "Serenade", from Romberg's The Student Prince; and "Yours Is My Heart Alone", from Franz Lehár's The Land of Smiles.
- In Izzenschnooken on the Lovely Essenzook Zee pays tribute to "In Egern on the Tegern See", another tune from Kern and Hammerstein's Music in the Air (Mandelbaum, CD 10, and also alludes generally to nostalgia songs like "Golden Days", from Romberg's The Student Prince; "Will You Remember", from Romberg's Maytime; "I’ll See You Again", from Noël Coward's Bitter Sweet; and "When I Grow too Old to Dream", from Romberg's The Night is Young.
- Playing Croquet + Swinging + How Do You Do? alludes to counterpoint songs in Irving Berlin and Meredith Willson musicals. Sung first separately, then with the first two combined, and finally with all three sung simultaneously in fine harmony, Besoyan's songs display counterpoint one-upsmanship. Counterpoint, in the context of popular music, is the simultaneous singing of separate songs, each with its own lyrics and each designed to harmonize with the other(s). Berlin's "Play a Simple Melody", from Watch Your Step, and "You’re Just in Love", from Call Me Madam, both have an initial tune and an untitled counterpoint tune that are sung simultaneously after first being sung independently; so does Willson's "Lida Rose" + "Will I Ever Tell You?", from The Music Man. Rick Besoyan salutes Berlin and Willson by doing them one better: combining three songs.
- Tell a Handsome Stranger alludes generally to boy-meets-girl songs such as "Kiss Me Again", from Herbert's Mlle. Modiste; "I’m Falling in Love with Someone", from Herbert's Naughty Marietta; "Marianne", from Romberg's The New Moon; and "Make Believe", from Kern's Show Boat; but the number particularly alludes to "Tell Me Pretty Maiden", from Leslie Stuart's Florodora (Mandelbaum, CD 10), the 1899 British musical comedy that moved to Broadway in 1900. A prominent feature of both numbers is the "walkaround" ritornello; a similar passage in the same "strolling" tempo occurs in "Half-past Two", a number from the popular Edwardian musical comedy "The Arcadians" (1909). The line "I'm falling – I’m falling in love with you" once more suggests Herbert's "I’m Falling in Love with Someone." The words "Oh, joy!" reflect the song "Oh Joy, Oh Rapture Unforeseen", from Gilbert and Sullivan's HMS Pinafore. And the words "You make my little heart go pitty-pat" closely paraphrase the words "Your heart goes pitter-patter", found in the counterpoint verse of Berlin's "You’re Just in Love", from Call Me Madam.
- Once in a Blue Moon alludes to the Romberg operetta The New Moon and to its song "Lover Come Back To Me." The antecedent tune's opening lines are "The sky was blue, and high above, the moon was new, and so was love." "Blue Moon" not only rhymes with "New Moon", it incorporates the word "blue" from the lyrics of "Lover Come Back to Me." And both songs display the theme of interrupted love. Viewed from the comedy perspective, "Once in a Blue Moon" evokes the lyrics of "All Er Nuthin", from Rodgers and Hammerstein's Oklahoma!. Both lyrics have two lovers – secondary characters – arguing about the girl's flirtatious ways.
- Colorado Love Call alludes to "Indian Love Call", from Rose-Marie.
- Every Little Nothing alludes to "Every Little Movement", from Karl Hoschna's Madame Sherry. The first five notes (sung with "ev-ry lit-l moe/nuth) of both songs are identical. The later words "every little moment" reinforce the parallelism by substituting "moment" for "movement" – a play on words.
- Such a Merry Party alludes to "This Was a Real Nice Clambake", from Rodgers and Hammerstein's Carousel; and perhaps also to "Drinking Song", from Romberg's The Student Prince.
- Say "Uncle" is primarily a parody of "(All the Girlies) Call Me 'Uncle'" from Friml's operetta The Firefly, although it also close parallels with "Every Day is Ladies' Day with Me' from Victor Herbert's "The Red Mill": the rhythms are the same and all three are confessions of an old roue who can't help spending money on pretty young girls, or "the dimpled darlings". There are also echoes of "Uncle" Drosselmeyer from The Nutcracker, a ballet.
- Me a Heap Big Injun alludes to "I'm An Indian, Too" from Irving Berlin's Annie Get Your Gun. Billy appears in "Indian" costume to sing how he always wanted to grow up to be an Indian Brave. Close parallels are evident: both songs lampoon "stage Indians" played (without much conviction) by white people, including perhaps the "Indian" characters in this very show. Both songs satirise racial stereotyping of Native Americans, although (especially in the case of "Heap Big Injun") this is done rather crudely and occasionally causes offence.
- Naughty, Naughty Nancy has a title that alludes to the title of Victor Herbert's operetta Naughty Marietta. The content and tone is similar to many operetta soubrette's numbers.
- Mata Hari is related to "Cleopatterer", a Jerome Kern song from "Leave It to Jane" ( 1917). Nancy describes Mata "doing this-a and that-a"; in "Jane", Flora sings " It simply use to knock them flat, When she went like this and then like that". Other "man-hungry soubrette" songs that Besoyan probably had in mind include "I Cain't Say No", from Rodgers and Hammerstein's Oklahoma!, and "Life Upon the Wicked Stage", from Kern's Show Boat.
- Do You Ever Dream of Vienna? is another nostalgia song like "Izzenschnooken." Besoyan's song pays homage to "Vienna Mine", from Emmerich Kalman's operetta Countess Maritza - although a number in praise of Vienna is not uncommon in operetta generally! It also seems to hint at "How Are Things in Glocca Morra?" from Burton Lane's Finian's Rainbow.
- A Shell Game (pantomime) alludes to the Victor Herbert operetta Babes in Toyland, which includes pantomime, but is similar generally to the full range of Broadway pantomime, the best example of which is the dream ballet sequence from Oklahoma!, danced to the song "Out of My Dreams."
- Coo Coo refers to another "bird-call" song, "Whip-Poor-Will" by Jerome Kern ( lyrics by B.G. DeSylva). It first appeared in the unsuccessful "Zip Goes a Million" ( 1919), but was resurrected in 1920 when sung by Marilyn Miller in "Sally". The second and third notes of the bird-call ( "poor-will") are identical to the cuckoo call. There may also be an allusion to "Bluebird of Happiness", a 1934 non-Broadway song popularized by Metropolitan Opera tenor Jan Peerce. Both title birds, according to their songs’ lyrics, bring cheer to sad listeners. Gilbert and Sullivan's The Mikado (1885) featured a desperate suitor singing of a bird that died of heartbreak, singing "Willow, titwillow" late in the opera.

== Recordings ==
- Little Mary Sunshine, a new musical. Original cast album. Capitol Records SWAO-1240 (stereo); WAO-1240 (mono), [LPs, recorded January 11, 1960 and released 1960]; and issued on CD as Angel ZDM 7 64774 2, (1993) and re-released as DRG 19099 (in 2007).
- The Migdal Production of Little Mary Sunshine. The original West End cast. Original cast album. AEI 1105, Stereo 33 1/3 [LP, recorded May 29, 1962]; CD released by DRG 13108 in 1992.

== Critical reaction ==
The New York Times called the musical "a merry and sprightly spoof of an era when 'justice always triumphed'... Little Mary Sunshine is an affectionate jab at the type of operetta that Rudolf Friml... made popular in the early Nineteen Twenties.... It is expertly performed by a group of young persons with felicitous voices and with good comic sense." Writing for the same paper, Brooks Atkinson wrote : "There are echos of both Gilbert and Sullivan in his dainty caricature of the old-fashioned operetta and musical comedy. But there are also echos of Strauss, Herbert, Kern, Romberg, Youmans, Friml, and anybody else who brought romantic lovers together in a triumphant last scene... it is seldom that a subtle satiric idea is brought off so adroitly in both the writing and the performing."

On the London production, The New York Times London correspondent wrote: "Even Little Mary Sunshine which arrived from Off-Broadway with a big reputation, seemed to us forced and its humors underscored, especially in comparison with The Boyfriend. It is one of those shows that succeed by becoming a cult, and it doesn't look as if that is happening here."
