= Forbidden: Undocumented and Queer in Rural America =

2016 documentary film

- Directed by: Tiffany Rhynard
- Produced by: Tiffany Rhynard; Heather Mathews; David Michael Barrett (co-producer)
- Starring: Moises Serrano
- Edited by: Heather Matthews
- Music by: Dave Merson Hess
- Release date: July 12, 2016 (Outfest)
- Running time: 88 minutes
- Country: United States
- Language: English

Forbidden: Undocumented and Queer in Rural America is a 2016 documentary about Moises Serrano, who grew up queer and undocumented in Yadkinville, North Carolina. Produced by director Tiffany Rhynard and editor Heather Mathews, along with co-producer, David Michael Barrett, the immigration reform documentary had its world premiere in Los Angeles at Outfest on July 12, 2016.

== Moises Serrano ==
The subject of Forbidden is Moises Serrano. When he was an infant, Serrano's parents fled Mexico in search of the American Dream. Forbidden to live and love as an undocumented gay man in the country he calls home, Serrano saw only one option—to fight for justice. He is just like the thousands of other young people growing up in the United States with steadfast dreams, however being gay and undocumented in the rural South presents tremendous challenges. This film chronicles Serrano's work as an activist, traveling across his home state of North Carolina as a voice for his community, and trying to forge a legal path for their future.

Serrano's journey illustrates the intersection of queer and immigrant issues, highlighting the challenges facing LGBT people growing up in the rural South, where racism and homophobia are not uncommon. Part of the film takes place in the spring of 2016, when presidential candidate Donald Trump invoked heated anti-immigrant rhetoric. At the same time North Carolina passed discriminatory laws against the LGBT community. Forbidden humanizes the issues of immigration and gay rights, demonstrating how one individual has the power to combat the destructive oppression of an entire group of people.

In claiming his identity as undocumented, Serrano risked deportation for himself and his family. His story demonstrates courage, conviction and an unyielding quest to challenge the circumstances in which he was born. Forbidden has inspired many other undocumented people to speak out, tell their stories, and join with like-minded politicians to affect change to U.S. immigration policy.

== Awards ==
- Outfest: Los Angeles Gay and Lesbian Film Festival, Freedom Award, 2016
- Southern Poverty Law Center’s Social Justice Film award at the 2016 Charlotte Film Festival, 2016
- Television Academy Honors
