= Daniel Hayes =

Trinidadian boxer, actor and model

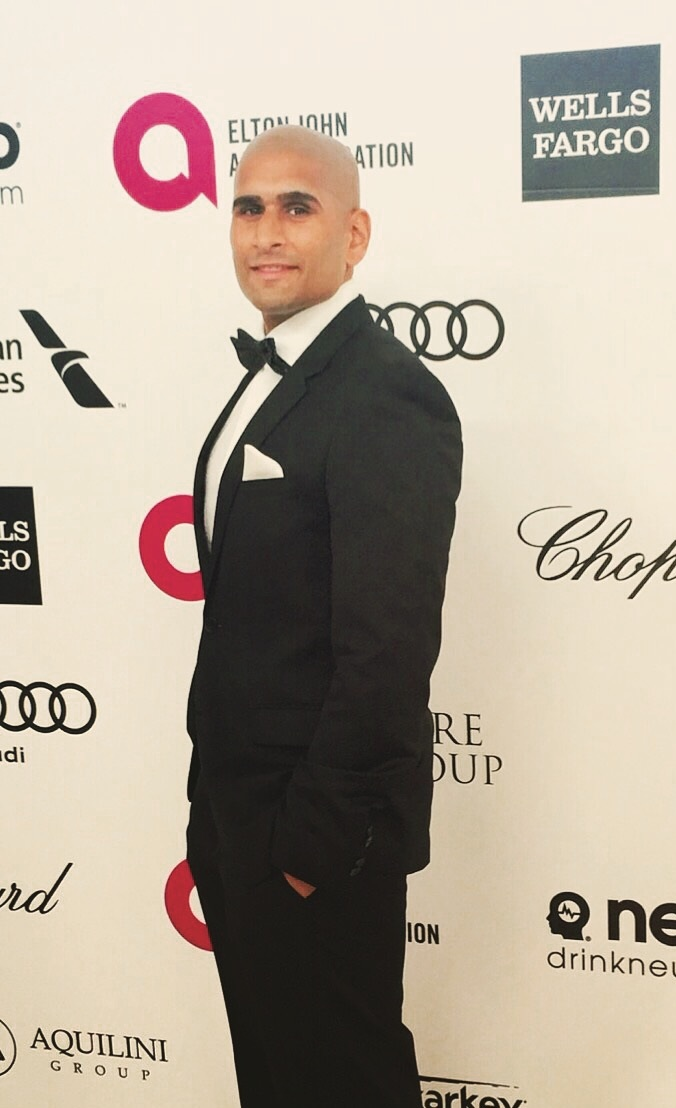
- Born: Trinidad
- Occupations: Actor, model
- Years active: 2002–present
- Website: www.daniel-hayes.com

Daniel Hayes is an actor, model and boxer. His professional career is based in Toronto, Ontario, Canada.

== Early life ==
Hayes was born in Trinidad and moved to Canada as a youth. From an early age, Daniel Hayes played soccer, basketball, football, amateur boxing, baseball, and swimming. Hayes later studied acting at The Second City and Groundlings, and trained at The Ivana Chubbuck Studio.

== Acting career ==
Hayes began his career as a print model in magazines and billboard ads for Gap, Guess, Nike, Sony, Hugo Boss, Lacoste, Armani Exchange and Andrew Christian. A few years later he was in his first two commercials with And1 and Nike.

In 2016, Hayes worked with filmmaker KB Kutz on The Honey Badger, a 15-minute boxing documentary that closely follows the life of Hayes as he prepares for his professional bout in Mexico. The film was shown at North Hollywood CineFest and Canadian Film Fest.

== Filmography ==
Film and television
Year	Title	Role	Notes
2007	Boot Camp	Marine	
2008	Between Love & Goodbye	Eric	Uncredited
2008	The Police Story	Criminal Suspect	
2008	Essence	Henry	Toronto 48-Hour Film Challenge 2008, Nominated—Best Actor Award
2009	Modern Day Gladiator	Dru	Screened at the LA Film Festival
2010	Body Language	Busboy	TV series
2011	Going Down in LA-LA Land	Lucas	Supporting Role
2013	Lucky 13	Bo	TV series
2013	Played	Colt Thug	TV series
2013	Open Gym	Boris	Short film
2014	Americanistan	Uzi Guard	Short film
2014	Friend Inc.	Alex	Short film
2016	After the Fight	Caleb Ganz	
2016	The Honey Badger	Himself	
upcoming	Finding Larry	Derek	
upcoming	The Silver Chain	Jason	
