= Andy Zeffer =

American novelist

Andy Zeffer is a novelist and artist, best known for his 2006 novel Going Down in La-La Land.

Zeffer studied in New York and joined the Screen Actors' Guild to work as an extra before moving to Los Angeles. There he worked for temp agencies, modelled, and worked on the fringes of the porn industry. He then moved to Fort Lauderdale where he became arts editor of the Express Gay News.

His novel Going Down in La-La Land was published in 2006. The book is centered on an actor named Adam Zeller, who moves from New York to Los Angeles. Zeffer has described it as a hybrid of fiction and memoir. It was a 2006 Lambda Literary Award finalist in the "Gay Romance" category.

Independent filmmaker Casper Andreas produced and directed a film based on this book, Going Down in LA-LA Land, released in 2011. Variety said that the film "offers few surprises, the usual modicum of titillation and a wish-fulfillment ending, but it still emerges a polished, entertaining look at biz realities from a gay perspective". The Los Angeles Times praised Michael Medico's performance as charming and nuanced, but found the film as a whole predictable.
