= Rick Besoyan =

- Born: Richard Besoyan; July 2, 1924; Reedley, California, United States
- Died: March 13, 1970 (aged 45) Sayville, New York, United States
- Occupations: Singer, director, composer, songwriter, playwright

Richard Besoyan (July 2, 1924 – March 13, 1970) was a singer, actor, playwright, composer and director especially of operetta and musicals. He is best remembered for writing the successful satirical musical Little Mary Sunshine.

== Life and career ==
Richard Besoyan was born in Reedley, California, to Amos and Mabel (Madie) Besoyan, on July 2, 1924. In 1928, the family moved to Alameda, California. Besoyan attended Lincoln School, writing his first song when he was twelve. He graduated from Alameda High School in 1942. While in High School, Besoyan and a few friends wrote and produced a musical, High and Dry. He enrolled at the University of California at Berkeley in 1942, but left during his first semester to volunteer for the army, serving in Europe for three years in the Special Services Division. While overseas, Besoyan attended the London School of Music, studying piano.

Upon his return, Besoyan joined the Bredon-Savoy Light Opera Company, where he performed the role of Ko-Ko in Gilbert and Sullivan's The Mikado. He left the company after two years and moved to New York, where he studied at the American Theater Wing and then taught musical comedy at Stella Adler's Theater School.

In 1957, he had mild success with a revival of Cole Porter's Out of this World at Actors Playhouse. Then Jim Paul Eilers asked him to write a revue for his nightclub The Showplace. In Your Hat was the result. An Act II finale, titled Gems from Little Mary Sunshine, featured some of the themes later to form part of the famous musical.

Little Mary Sunshine opened Off-Broadway in 1959 and was primarily a takeoff of old-fashioned operetta. Besoyan won the 1959–1960 Vernon Rice Memorial Award for outstanding theatrical achievement. He wrote book, music and lyrics for two other shows. The 1963 Broadway production of The Student Gypsy or The Prince of Liederkranz had just 22 performances. It starred Eileen Brennan and Dom DeLuise; however, it opened during negotiations with the musician union and was also affected by a newspaper strike. Besoyan also wrote the 1964 off-Broadway production of Babes in the Wood starring Ruth Buzzi, which ran for 45 performances. Neither of these shows has been recorded.

In 1966, William S. Godfrey, Mayor of Alameda, California, proclaimed September 16 "Rick Besoyan Day". In 1969, Besoyan was inducted into the Songwriters Hall of Fame.

In 1970, Besoyan died of internal hemorrhages in Sayville, Long Island, New York. He had just completed directing the Sayville Musical Workshop's production of How to Succeed in Business Without Really Trying and was writing lyrics and music for a dramatization of Paul Gallico's Mrs. Arris Goes to Paris.
