= Sunset Strip =

West Hollywood portion of Sunset Boulevard

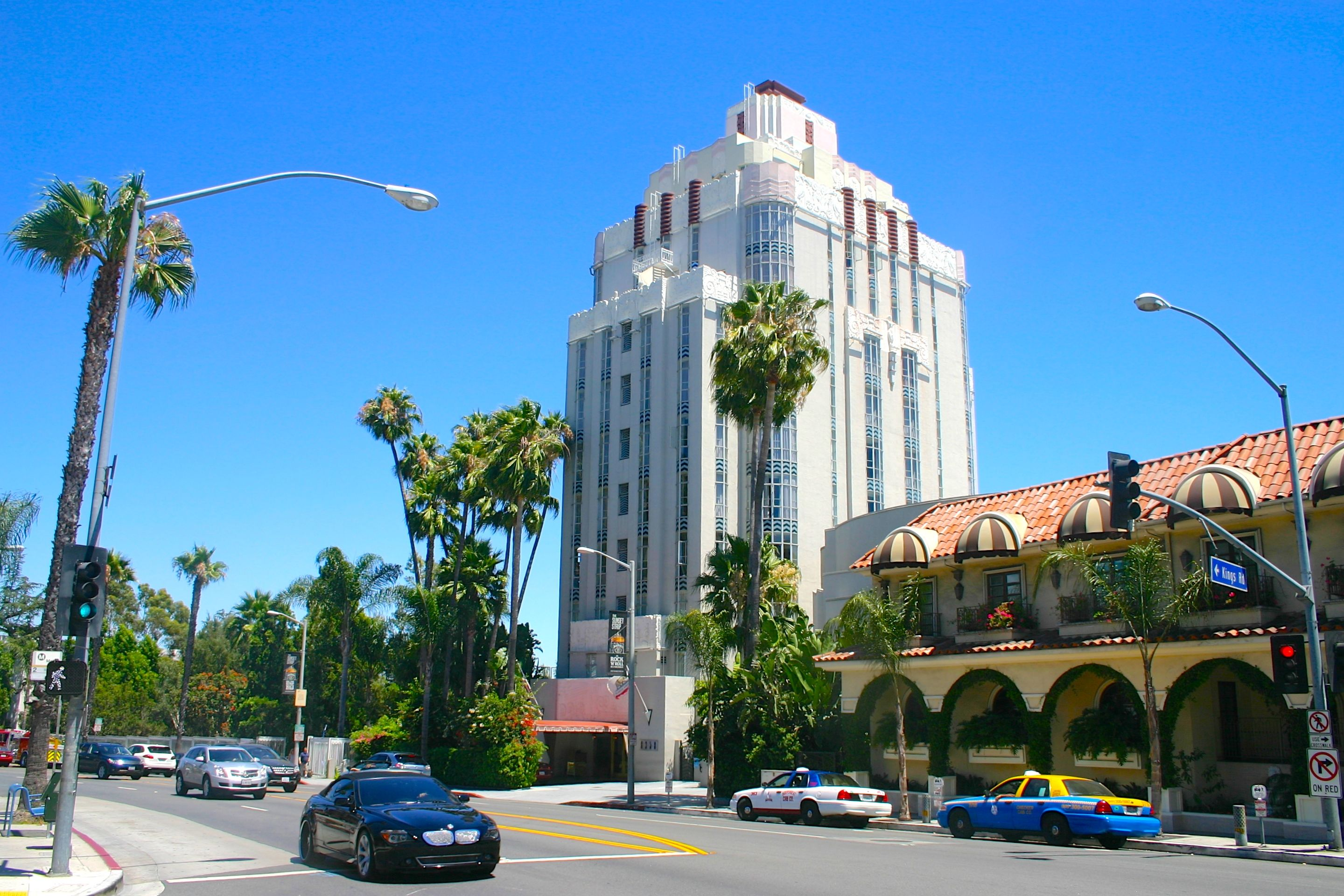
The Sunset Tower on Sunset Boulevard

The Sunset Strip is the 1.7-mile (2.7 km) stretch of Sunset Boulevard that passes through the city of West Hollywood, California, United States. It extends from West Hollywood's eastern border with the city of Los Angeles near Marmont Lane to its western border with Beverly Hills at Phyllis Street. The Sunset Strip is known for its boutiques, restaurants, rock clubs, and nightclubs, as well as its array of huge, colorful billboards.

== History ==
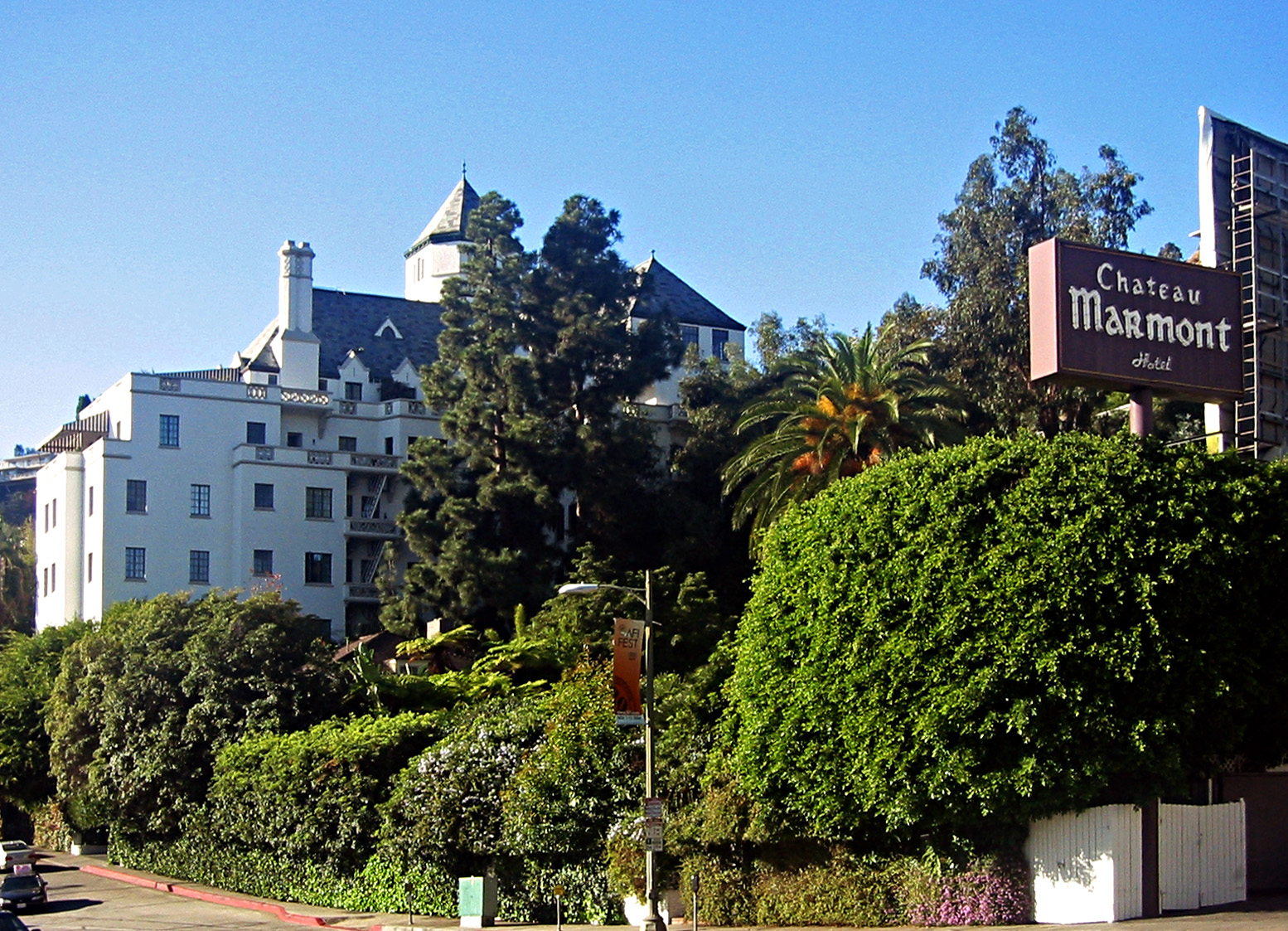
Chateau Marmont, constructed in the 1920s

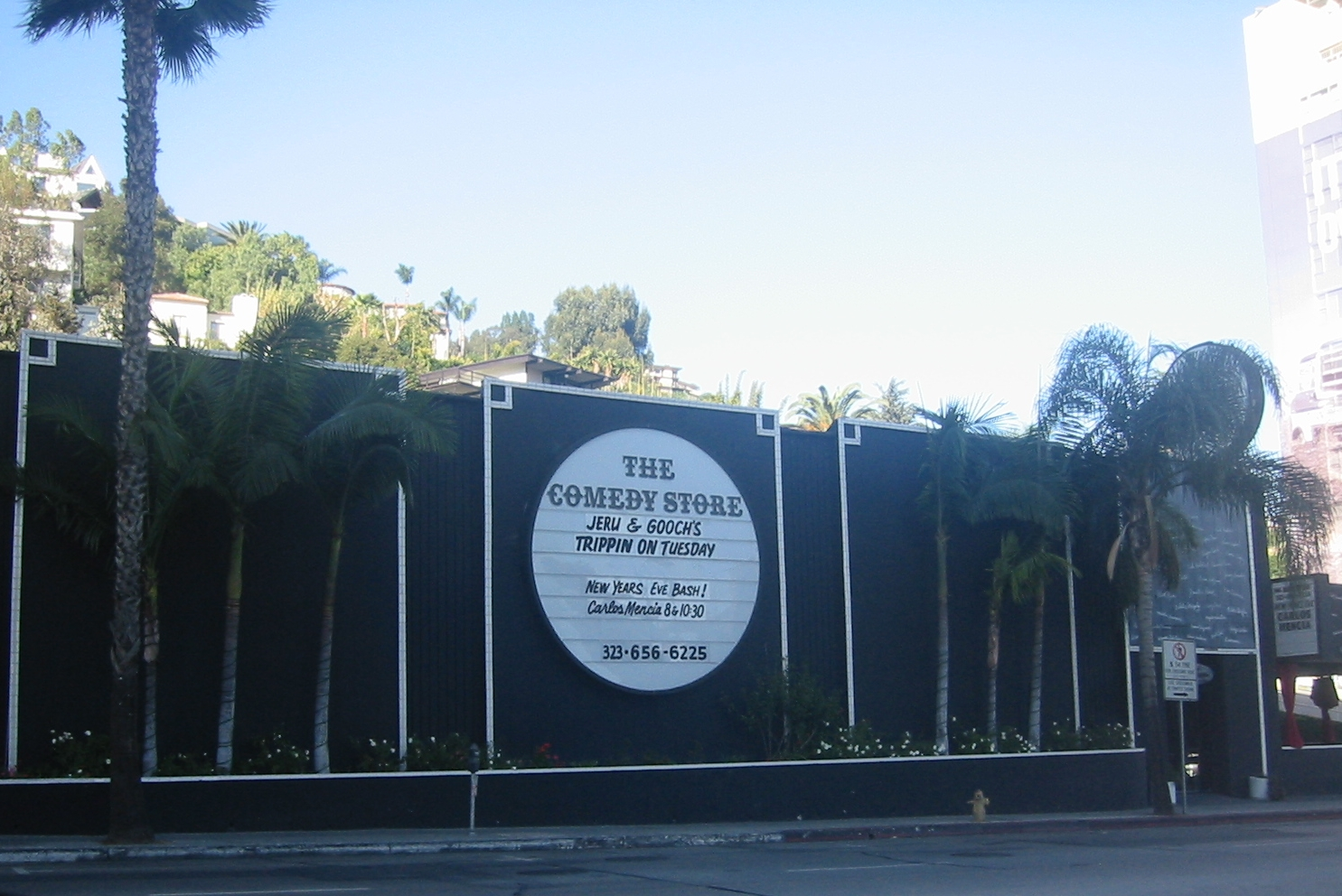
The Comedy Store

Prior to the 1984 incorporation of the city of West Hollywood, the Sunset Strip lay in an unincorporated area of Los Angeles County. Because of this, the Sunset Strip and all of West Hollywood gained a reputation for being a loosely regulated area, in large part because it was not under the jurisdiction of the Los Angeles Police Department.

=== 1920s ===
Gambling was illegal in the city of Los Angeles, but legal in unincorporated Los Angeles County, which fostered the development of rather wilder nightlife in West Hollywood than was found within the city limits. In the 1920s a number of nightclubs and casinos moved in along Sunset Strip, which attracted movie people; alcohol was served in back rooms during Prohibition.

=== 1930s and 1940s ===
In the 1930s and the 1940s, restaurants and nightclubs on Sunset Strip, like Sherry's, Ciro's, the Mocambo and the Trocadero, were patronized by people working in the movie industry. Sunset Strip was featured in Raymond Chandler's 1949 Philip Marlowe novel, The Little Sister. Also located on the Sunset Strip were the Garden of Allah apartments, home to transplanted writers like Robert Benchley, Dorothy Parker, and F. Scott Fitzgerald. As well as Schwab's Pharmacy.

=== 1960s ===
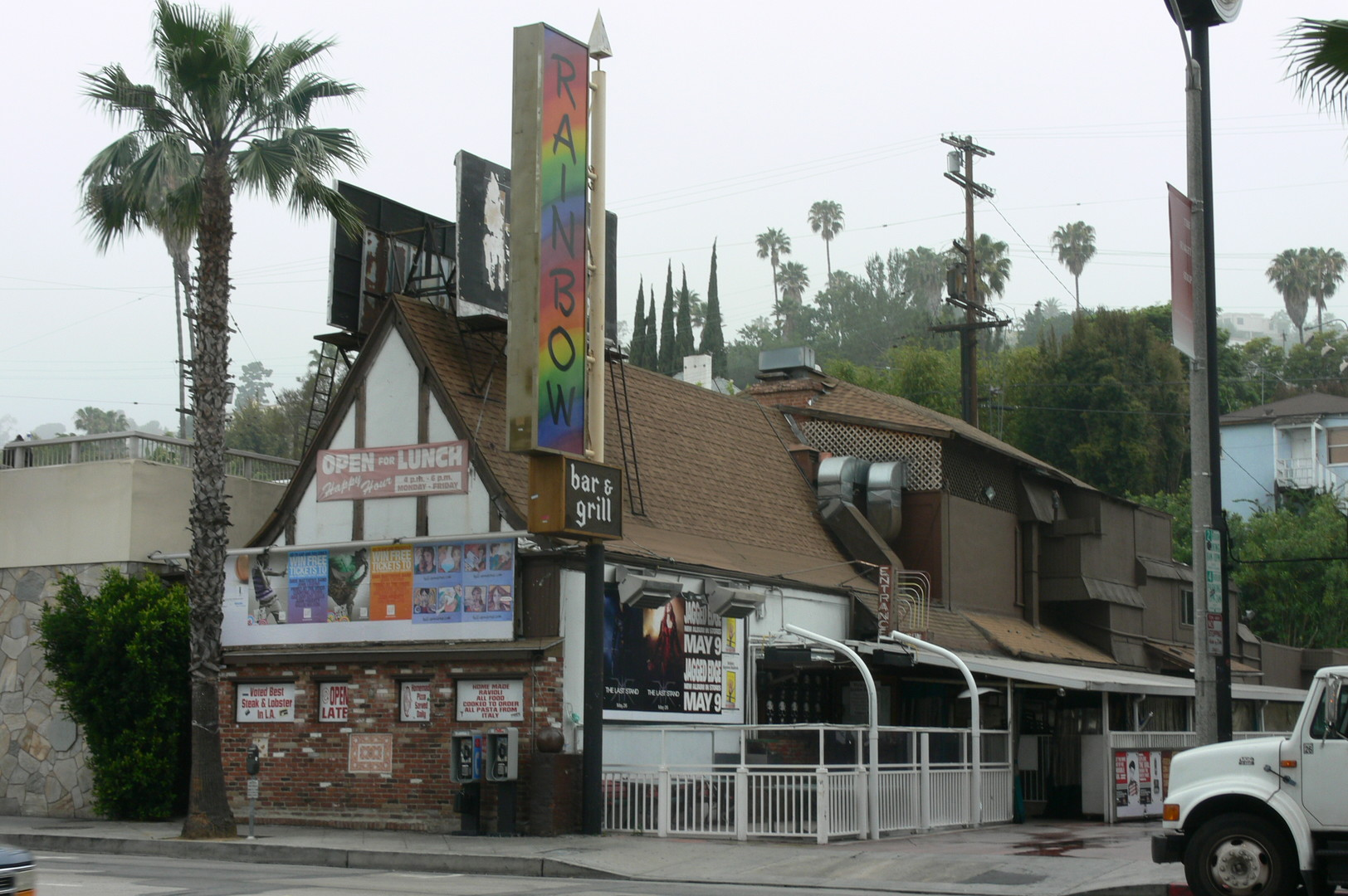
Rainbow Bar and Grill

By the early 1960s, Sunset Strip had lost favor with the majority of movie people, but its restaurants, bars and clubs continued to serve as an attraction for locals and tourists. In the mid-1960s it became a major gathering place for the counterculture and was the scene of the Sunset Strip curfew riots in November 1966, involving police and crowds of young club-goers. Those riots inspired the Buffalo Springfield song "For What It's Worth".

Sunset Strip became popular with rock musicians and their fans. Bands such as Led Zeppelin, the Doors, the Byrds, Love, the Seeds, Frank Zappa, and others played at clubs like Gazzarri's, the Whisky a Go Go, the Roxy, Pandora's Box and the London Fog. In July 1965 Go-Go dancers also began performing. The Hyatt West Hollywood (now known as the Andaz West Hollywood) became a popular hotel.

=== 1970s ===
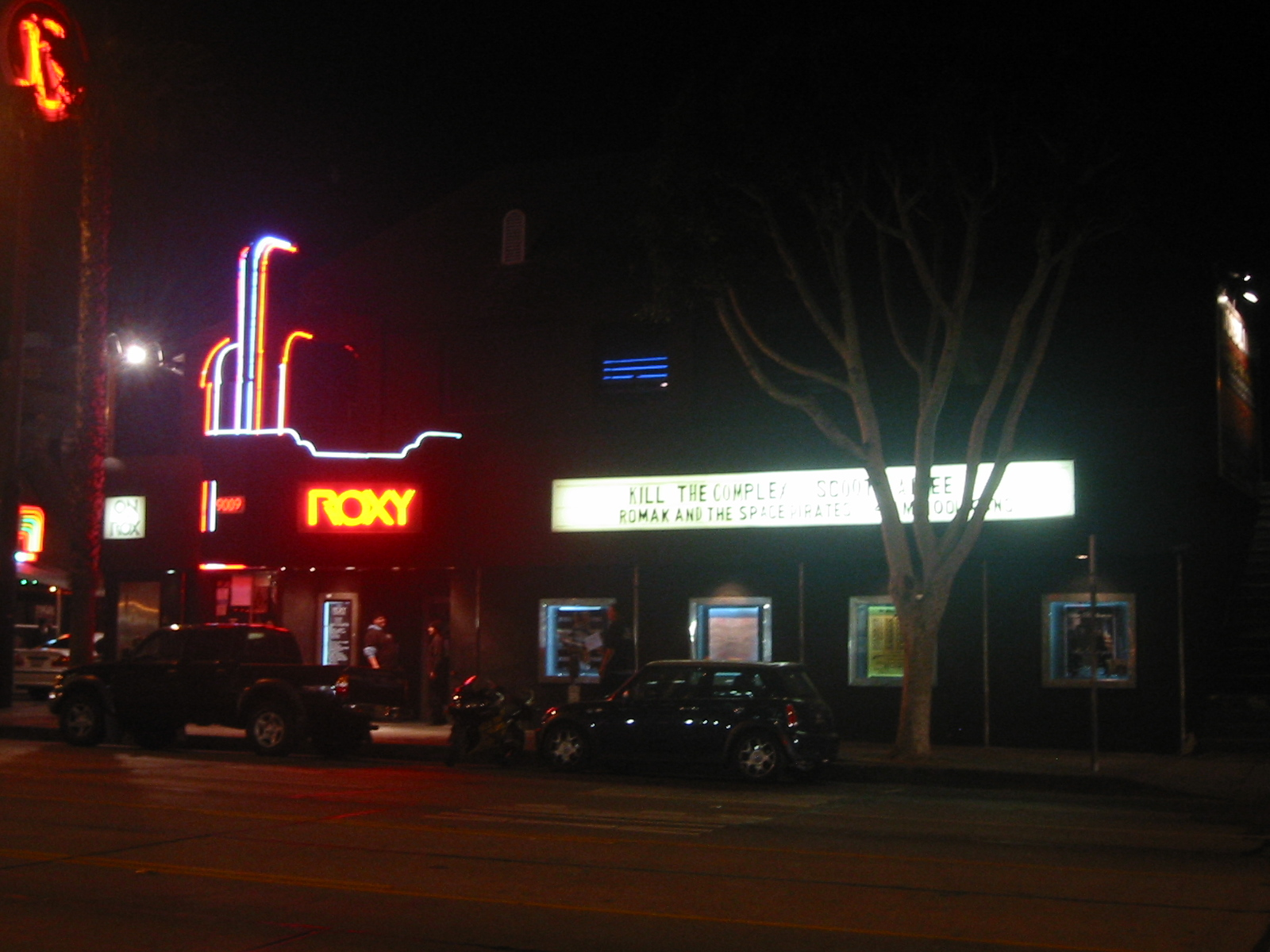
Roxy Theatre

Rodney Bingenheimer's English Disco, influenced by Britain's glam rock movement, opened in 1972. It became a hangout for musicians, including the Stooges and the New York Dolls. Clubs on the Sunset Strip at that time, Rodney Bingenheimer's in particular, were notorious for allowing teenage patrons. Quiet Riot founder Kelly Garni, who was a teenager when the band began playing in the area, recalled: "Nobody carried or cared about ID's. Thirteen-year-old girls could walk in dressed like sexy 25-year-olds, and kids could sidle up to the bar and order a cocktail, so it wasn't a big stretch for us to get up and play there." The 1979 Donna Summer song "Sunset People", from the album Bad Girls, was about the nightlife on Sunset Boulevard. Sunset Strip continued to be a major focus for punk rock and new wave music during the late 1970s.

=== 1980s ===
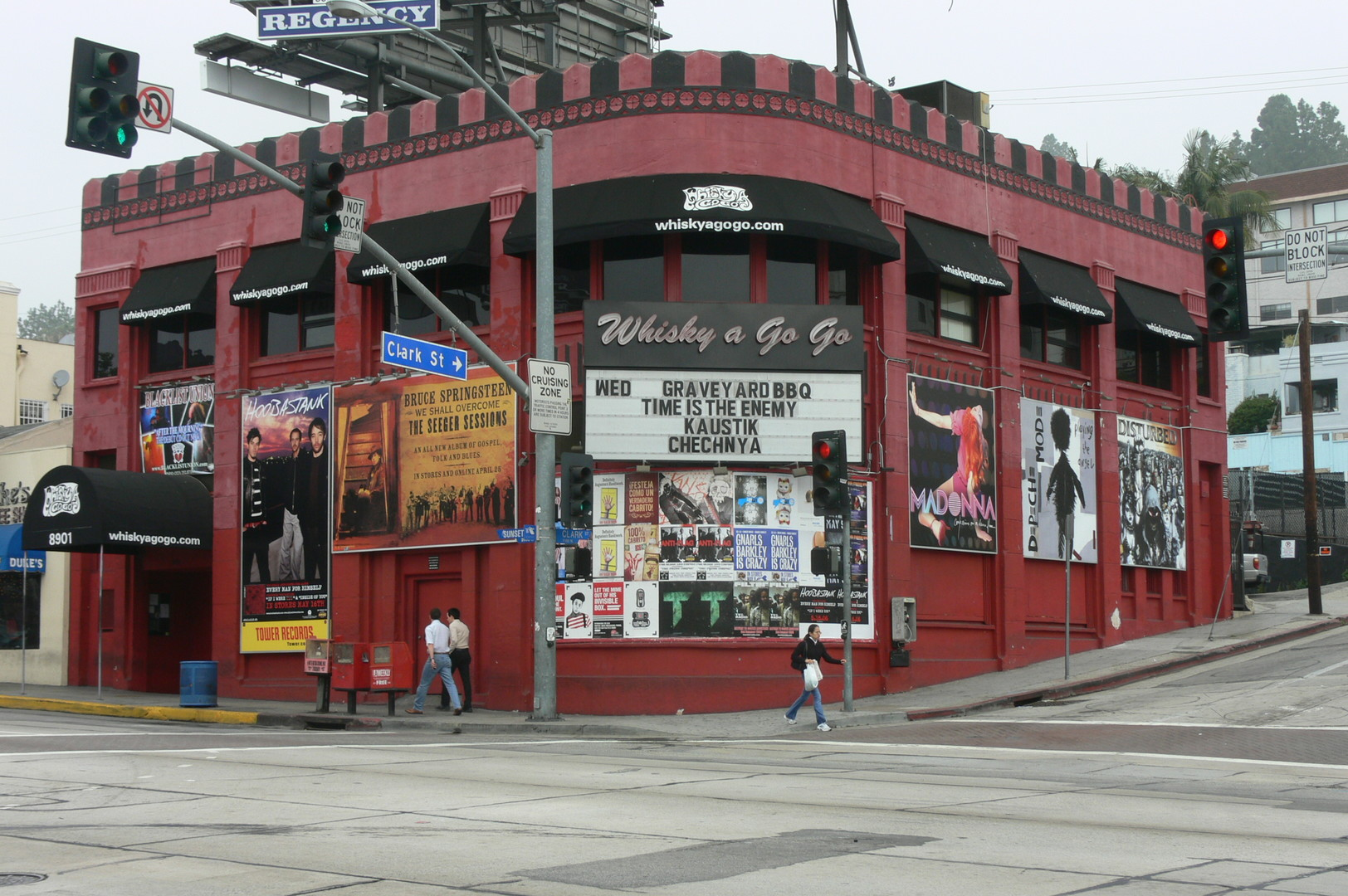
Whisky a Go Go

During the latter part of the 1970s and well into the 1980s, the Sunset Strip would become synonymous with the Los Angeles heavy metal movement, commonly referred to as the West Coast Metal Explosion. The clubs on the Sunset Strip such as the Whisky a Go Go and The Roxy, became home to numerous LA-based heavy metal bands such as Van Halen, Quiet Riot, Mötley Crüe, Razor Fury, Ratt, Dokken, Poison, W.A.S.P., Great White, Roxx Regime (who later became Stryper) and Guns N' Roses. The scene became synonymous with glam metal, with many fans mimicking the hair and clothing worn by the bands. The many heavy metal fans who would congregate outside the clubs along the strip became a defining feature.

Ratt frontman Stephen Pearcy later named this same handful of bands — Roxx Regime, Dante Fox (Great White), W.A.S.P., Quiet Riot, Mötley Crüe and Ratt — as the acts that "really kickstarted" the Strip's rise into the epicentre of the scene.

Quiet Riot's 1983 breakthrough with Metal Health is often cited as the moment record labels began actively pursuing Sunset Strip's hard rock scene; drummer Frankie Banali said the band "opened up the door for everyone else". Bassist Rudy Sarzo noted, however, that several other prominent acts predated the breakthrough: "There was a version of Ratt named Mickey Ratt at the same time as Quiet Riot in the late '70s. Great White was there. The Dokken guys were around. Nikki Sixx was playing with London."

The adoption of "pay to play" policies, in which bands were charged a fee to play at clubs, diminished its appeal to groups, other than as an industry showcase. As of the 2010s, the music industry establishment continues to dominate the clubs on Sunset Strip.

In November 1984, voters in West Hollywood passed a proposal on the ballot to incorporate, and the area became an independent city. Increasingly, the western end of Sunset Strip was occupied by office buildings, mostly catering to the entertainment industry, as well as hotels.

=== 1990s ===
During the 1990s, the center of the alternative music activity in Los Angeles shifted further east to areas like Echo Park, Silver Lake and Los Feliz.

== Landmarks ==
City of Los Angeles
Crescent Heights Boulevard | Crescent Heights Boulevard
Chateau Marmont
Marmont Lane
Pink Taco | City of West Hollywood
Sweetzer Avenue | Sweetzer Avenue
Carney's
Saddle Ranch | Sunset Tower
Kings Road
Andaz West Hollywood
The Comedy Store
Piazza del Sol | Mondrian Hotel
SkyBar
Pink Dot
Miller Drive | La Cienega Boulevard
Fred Segal
Book Soup
The Viper Room
Clark Street | San Vicente Boulevard
Whisky a Go Go
Roxy Theatre
Rainbow Bar and Grill
Doheny Drive | Doheny Drive
9200 Sunset
Soho House West Hollywood
Phyllis Street
City of Beverly Hills

== In popular culture ==
77 Sunset Strip, a 1958–1964 TV series, was set on Sunset Strip between La Cienega Boulevard and Alta Loma Road.

Studio 60 on the Sunset Strip was a behind-the-scenes television drama of a late-night comedy sketch show performed at a fictional theater on Sunset Strip.

Premiering on January 27, 2006, in Los Angeles at Vanguard Hollywood, (Note: Beginning on July 27, 2005, a 45 minute showcase of Rock Ages was first produced at the King King along Hollywood Boulevard in Los Angeles.) the Rock of Ages stage production inspired the 2012 film of the same name. Its story line is centered along Sunset Strip in 1987.

The opening credits of the HBO TV series Entourage featured shots of Sunset Strip.

Los Angeles-based artist Edward Ruscha created the artist's book Every Building on the Sunset Strip in 1966, later 12 Sunsets website for the Getty Research Institute.
