= Andaz West Hollywood, By Hyatt =

Hotel in West Hollywood, California

Andaz West Hollywood
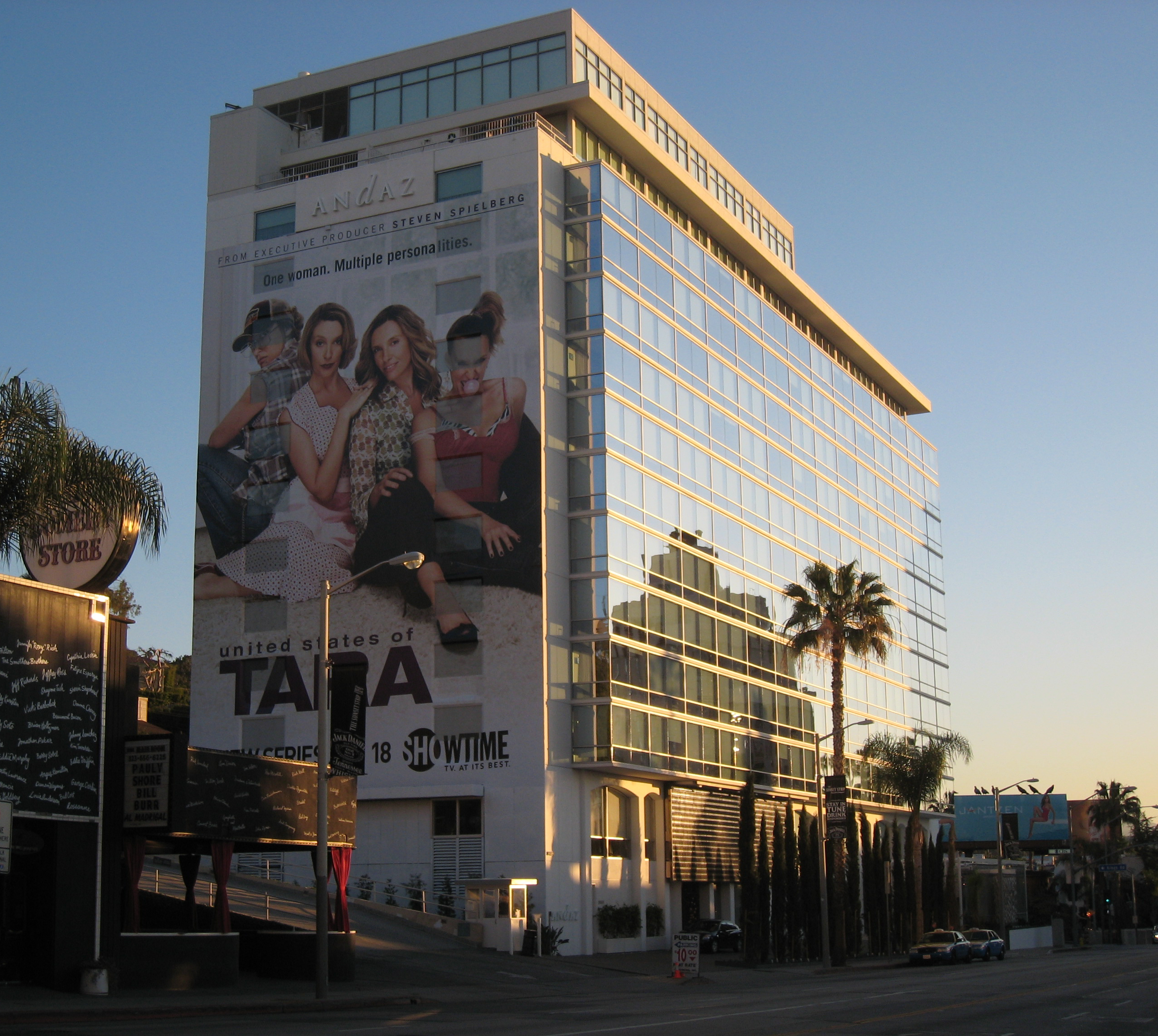
- Andaz West Hollywood hotel on Sunset Boulevard in West Hollywood, California

- Location in Western Los Angeles
- Former names: Gene Autry's Hotel Continental; Continental Hyatt House; Hyatt on Sunset; Hyatt West Hollywood

General information
- Location: 8401 Sunset Boulevard, West Hollywood, California
- Coordinates: 34.0953896°N 118.3731942°W
- Opening: 1963
- Owner: Hyatt Hotels
- Operator: Hyatt Hotels

Technical details
- Floor count: 14

Other information
- Number of rooms: 239
- Number of suites: 20

Website
- https://westhollywood.andaz.hyatt.com/en/hotel/home.html

The Andaz West Hollywood is a 239-room Hyatt hotel located at 8401 Sunset Boulevard, West Hollywood, California (at Kings Road).

== History ==
The hotel was opened in 1963 by Gene Autry as Gene Autry's Hotel Continental. Leased to Hyatt Hotels Corporation in 1966, it was renamed the Continental Hyatt House.

In the late 1960s and 1970s the hotel's proximity to popular clubs such as the Whisky a Go Go made it the preferred Los Angeles accommodation for touring rock groups, notably English bands Led Zeppelin, The Who and the Rolling Stones. It was often referred to at the time as the "Riot House", a play on the name Hyatt House.

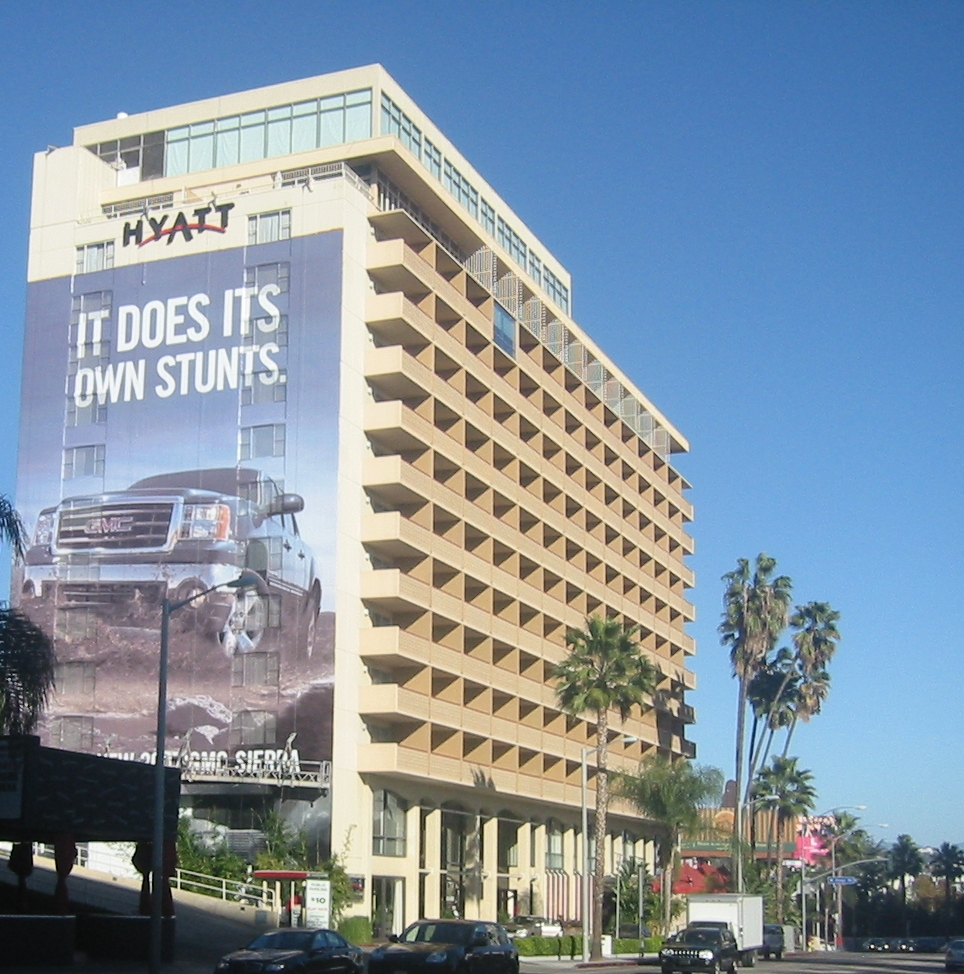
Hyatt West Hollywood hotel in 2006 prior to renovation

In 1976 the hotel became the Hyatt on Sunset. In February 1997, the hotel was renamed the Hyatt West Hollywood. The hotel was renovated in 2008 and reopened on January 8, 2009 as the Andaz West Hollywood, the second Andaz hotel in the new brand by Hyatt Hotels and Resorts. The 14-story Andaz West Hollywood has 239 rooms, including 20 suites and a restaurant called Riot House. The renovation was completed by New York-based architecture and interior design firm Janson Goldstein LLP and includes a hand-painted metal disk 11-foot sculpture by renowned New York-based artist Jacob Hashimoto. The balconies made famous by stories of rock stars throwing televisions from them are now glass-enclosed sunrooms that overlook Sunset Boulevard.

== Association with rock stars and film ==
- Led Zeppelin rented as many as six floors of the hotel in the mid-to-late 1970s for the band members and entourage. Drummer John Bonham was reported to have driven a motorcycle along the hallways (some say it was tour manager Richard Cole). In the film Rock Star the incident was recreated with Chris "Izzy" Cole doing the same.
- Room 1015 bears the distinction of being where Rolling Stones guitarist Keith Richards dropped a TV out the window in 1972. The Who's Keith Moon was also reported to have dropped a TV out of one of the hotel's windows. In the film Rock Star the character "A.C.", played by Jason Bonham, son of Led Zeppelin drummer John Bonham, throws a TV out the window in rage, after he is told that his wife ran off with Peter Gabriel.
- Lemmy wrote the song "Motorhead" on one of the hotel balconies in the middle of the night, using Roy Wood's Ovation acoustic guitar.
- Scenes in the film Almost Famous which depict the hotel were filmed at the actual hotel. Parts of the hotel were refurbished with exactly the same decor as existed there in the 1970s.
- The scene from Almost Famous in which Russell Hammond cries out, "I am a golden god!" is a reference to Led Zeppelin singer Robert Plant, who allegedly said the same thing while looking over Sunset Strip from one of the hotel's balconies in 1975.
- The two-part pilot episode of The Rockford Files, "Backlash of the Hunter', had a scene where character Sarah Hunter (Lindsay Wagner) lured the killer of her father into room 1426.
- The end-of-tour party scene in the film This is Spinal Tap was filmed on the roof of the hotel.
- Slipknot Frontman Corey Taylor attempted suicide by jumping from an eighth floor balcony on November 14, 2003, but was stopped.
- Little Richard lived in room 319 at the hotel through much of the 1980s and 1990s
- Jim Morrison lived there until he was reportedly evicted by management for hanging out a window by his fingertips, dangling over the pavement.
- The members of Blur attempted to make an improvised steam room in a bathroom by turning on the hot taps and blocking any gaps outside.
- Warren Zevon references this place in his song "Poor Poor Pitiful Me".
- Thin Lizzy's Phil Lynott and Scott Gorham were interviewed in room 1024 for 1976 interview.
- Elton John and his entourage stayed at the then-Hyatt House on John's first trip to United States in August 1970.
- A lengthy P.O.V. murder sequence in Kathryn Bigelow's 1995 film Strange Days, involving the killer climbing from one room to another via the exterior balconies, was filmed at the hotel, which is given the fictional name Sunset Regent.

== Sources ==
- Kurutz, Steven, "Rock 'n' Roll Hotels for a New Generation," The New York Times, July 9, 2006.
- Fein, Art, (1998) The L.A. Musical History Tour: A Guide to the Rock and Roll Landmarks of Los Angeles, 2.13.61 Publications, ISBN 1-880985-57-8
- Chefs de Cuisine Ass'n banquet menu, February 20, 1967, LAPL Menu Collection
