= Pink Dot =

Grocery store in West Hollywood, California, United States

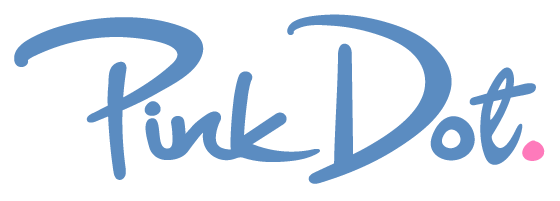
- "Legendary Delivery"
- Type: Grocer
- Industry: Retail
- Founded: 1987 (Los Angeles, California)
- Headquarters: Los Angeles, California
- Products: Deli, frozen foods, general grocery, snacks, liquor
- Website: pinkdot.com

Pink Dot is a quick delivery prepared-to-order grocery store based on the Sunset Strip in West Hollywood, California. The store has appeared in several movies and television shows, including HBO's Entourage.

== History ==
Entrepreneur Bill Toro founded the chain in 1987 with the purchase of a single liquor store. His idea to create a delivery-based operation arose from numerous complaints he observed about the traffic in Los Angeles. Pink Dot is a privately owned corporation with Toro retaining 30% control.

In 1996, Pink Dot was referred to as a rapidly expanding grocery delivery company in a Los Angeles Times story that noted the store guaranteed delivery within 45 minutes for a service charge of $9.99. Orders were filled from five warehouses. Company executives at the time predicted home delivery would become a "big part of the changing face of retail."

As Pink Dot prepared to expand into Orange County, the company phased out its signature polka-dotted, propeller-topped Volkswagen Beetle delivery cars after market tests showed that Orange County residents wanted their purchases delivered in more low-profile vehicles.

Pink Dot partnered with order takers such as the now-defunct Kozmo.com, which went defunct in the bursting of the dot-com bubble, as a way to expand the product line into items such as Compact Discs and pharmaceuticals.

=== Late 2000s ===
In 2008, Pink Dot announced a partnership with Ford Motor Company and began using the Ford Transit Connect, a delivery system that Pink Dot president Sol Yamini described as "room service for your home."

In 2019, Pink Dot partnered with Postmates to extend its offerings to app users.
