= Bad Actress =

- Film poster
- Directed by: Robert Lee King
- Written by: David Michael Barrett
- Produced by: Lisa Schahet
- Starring: Beth Broderick; Chris Mulkey; Whitney Able; Ryan Hansen; Vincent Ventresca; Andrew Levitas; Nathan Lee Graham; Keri Lynn Pratt; Corbin Bernsen; Dee Wallace
- Cinematography: Andrew Huebscher
- Edited by: Matthew Cassel
- Music by: Frederik Wiedmann
- Production company: HMO Nurse Productions
- Distributed by: Strand Releasing
- Release dates: March 2011 (Miami); February 22, 2012
- Running time: 86 minutes
- Country: United States
- Language: English

Bad Actress is a 2011 American independent feature film, directed by Robert Lee King, written by David Michael Barrett, produced by Lisa Schahet, and starring Beth Broderick as has-been TV star Alyssa Rampart-Pillage. The picture had its world premiere at the Miami International Film Festival in March, 2011.

A dark comedy, the movie is a retelling of the Greek tragedy Elektra set in the San Fernando Valley. Night-time TV soap queen, Alyssa Rampart-Pillage (Beth Broderick), is a has-been, but her career is restarted once she’s accused of murdering her husband, Bernie (Chris Mulkey), the appliance king of the San Fernando Valley.

== Cast ==
- Beth Broderick as Alyssa Rampart-Pillage
- Chris Mulkey as Bernie Pillage
- Whitney Able as Rebecca Pillage
- Ryan Hansen as Russell Pillage
- Vincent Ventresca as Morris Pillage
- Andrew Levitas as George Apodaca
- Nathan Lee Graham as Cassandra/Dave
- Keri Lynn Pratt as Topanga Pillage
- Jason Olive as Det. Ray Stoker
- Deborah S. Craig as Det. Pam Rudin
- Corbin Bernsen as himself
- Dee Wallace as herself
- Greg Proops as Barry
- Sean Hankinson as Forensics Coordinator

== Production ==
Bad Actress, produced by Lisa Schahet of HMO Nurse Productions, had a 24-day shooting schedule. Most of the movie was shot on location in the San Fernando Valley, where the movie takes place. The shooting title for the film was Tarzana, which then changed to (818), and finally to Bad Actress. Screenwriter David Michael Barrett was executive producer, along with Marcus Hu and Jon Gerrans of Strand Releasing.

== Awards ==
- Best Actress, Beth Broderick at the New York Independent Film Festival for her role as Alyssa Rampart-Pillage, August 2011
- Best Picture, the "10 Degrees Hotter Award," at the Valley Film Festival, November, 2011

== Release ==
After a successful film festival run launched at the Miami International Film Festival, and screenings worldwide, including the prestigious Cleveland International Film Festival, the movie sold to Strand Releasing, who are distributing the film on Netflix, Hulu, Amazon, iTunes, VOD, DVD and Blu-ray.
