= Casper Andreas =

Swedish actor and film director

- Born: September 28, 1972 (age 54); Sweden
- Occupations: Actor; film director; film producer; screenwriter
- Years active: 1996–present

Casper Andreas (born September 28, 1972) is a Swedish actor, film director, screenwriter and film producer based in New York City.

== Career ==
Andreas was born in Sweden. He made his feature film debut as a director with the romantic comedy Slutty Summer (2004). Since then, he has directed numerous, award-winning films, including A Four Letter Word (2007), Between Love and Goodbye (2008), The Big Gay Musical (2009), and Violet Tendencies (2010). His most recent film Going Down in LA-LA Land appeared at several film festivals in 2011. Variety suggested that Andreas "shows signs of maturing talent" with this film and called his performance "dangerously sexy."

Andreas has worked with talents such as Mindy Cohn, Alec Mapa, Bruce Vilanch, and Marcus Patrick. He is the head of Embrem Entertainment.

=== Going Down in LA-LA Land ===
Based on the literary work of Andy Zeffer, Casper Andreas directed the 2011 film Going Down in LA-LA Land. The film follows a struggling actor, Adam, as he moves to Hollywood and tries to break into the film business. With his friend Nick's urging, Adam takes a role in front of the camera and becomes an instant success ... in gay pornography.

"It's the gay Pretty Woman," states Andreas, "It wasn't meant to glamorize the porn industry in any way, but I needed to show how (Adam) gets seduced by it. Adam loses control."

=== Kiss Me, Kill Me ===
In October 2014, Casper Andreas with screenwriter/producer David Michael Barrett launched a funding campaign for a new film project titled Kiss Me, Kill Me.

== Filmography ==
Year	Title	Role	Notes
1996	Close Up	Cop	actor
1997	Colin Fitz Lives!	Mats	actor
1998	Celebrity	Nicole's Stylist (uncredited)	actor
1999	Serpent's Breath	Jack	actor
2000	Citizen James	Brandon	actor
2001	Hunger	Scissors	actor
2003	Marci X	Hairdresser (uncredited)	actor
2004	Marmalade	Helmut	actor
2005	Hitch	Sebastian (uncredited)	actor
2006	Little Children	2nd Policeman at Pool	actor
2004	Slutty Summer	Markus	director; writer; actor
2005	Mormor's Visit		director; writer; short film, 16 minutes
2007	A Four Letter Word		director; writer
2008	Between Love & Goodbye		director; writer
2009	Saying Goodbye		director; writer; short film, 11 minutes
2009	The Big Gay Musical	Usher	director; actor
2010	Violet Tendencies	Markus	director; actor
2011	Going Down in LA-LA Land	Nick	director; writer; actor; based on the novel by Andy Zeffer
2011	Contracts (Everything's Gonna Be Pink)	Johan	actor
2012	Welcome to New York	Christopher	actor; short film, 30 minutes
2013	Ett Sista Farväl (A Last Farewell)		director; writer; Swedish language short film, 13 minutes
2015	The Adderall Diaries	Nate Sweetzer	actor
2015	Kiss Me, Kill Me	Dr. Winters	director; actor
2016	Flatbush Luck	Sebastien	director; writer; actor
2016	I Dream Too Much	Photographer	actor
2016	Killing Joan	Anson	actor
2018	Wild Nights with Emily	Joseph Lyman	producer; actor

== See also ==
- LGBT culture in New York City
- List of LGBT people from New York City
- NYC Pride March
