= The Big Gay Musical =

- Theatrical release poster
- Directed by: Casper Andreas; Fred M. Caruso
- Written by: Fred M. Caruso
- Produced by: Fred M. Caruso; Casper Andreas; Jay Arnold; Tom D'Angora; Michael Duling; Edward Miller (executive)
- Starring: Lena Hall; Daniel Robinson; Joey Dudding; Jeff Metzler; Casper Andreas; Patrick Catney
- Cinematography: Jon Fordham
- Edited by: Alexander Hammer
- Music by: Rick Crom
- Production company: Big Gay Musical Productions
- Distributed by: Embrem Entertainment (U.S. DVD)
- Release date: August 9, 2009
- Country: United States
- Language: English

The Big Gay Musical is a 2009 gay-themed musical-comedy film written by Fred M. Caruso and co-directed by Caruso and Casper Andreas. The film follows a brief period in the lives of two young actors, one who is openly gay, the other closeted to his parents. The openly gay actor struggles with whether he should be sexually promiscuous or seek a life partner, while the closeted one wonders if he should come out to his conservative, religious parents.

Throughout the film, there are a series of musical numbers with tap dancing angels, a re-telling of the Genesis story, protests from televangelists, and a deprogramming camp that tries to turn gay kids straight. By the end of the film, the characters realize that life would be better if they just accepted themselves the way they are.

== Plot ==
Paul (Daniel Robinson) and Eddie (Joey Dudding) have just begun previews of an Off-Broadway musical titled Adam & Steve: Just the Way God Made 'Em. The movie follows both the storyline of the musical, and the lives of the two main leads.

=== Adam and Steve ===
After God expels Adam and Eve from the Garden of Eden, he decides to put a gay couple, Adam and Steve, in charge of Eden. Out of spite, Eve writes the Bible to teach the future generations to hate gays. Five thousand years later, Steve is reincarnated in a Christian household and sent to a conversion therapy camp, where he encounters Adam. They feel an instant connection and abandon the camp, accepting themselves as gay men. An angel appears to take them to New York City, where they find their families. God appears to confirm that they are "just the way he made 'em". Their families finally accept them, and God joins their souls forever.

=== Paul and Eddie ===
Paul's main conflict is seeking the ideal male partner, and Eddie finds that his religious upbringing conflicts with his homosexuality. Paul is falsely accused of being HIV-positive and his boyfriend dumps him. He becomes disenchanted about monogamy and tries being promiscuous and online dating, but he finds this lifestyle unsatisfying and finds out he craves a loving, stable relationship. He constantly bumps into Charles, a fan that has developed a crush for him. Eventually, Charles wins him over by visiting him at a karaoke bar and serenading him with a love song.

Eddie is closeted to his conservative parents, but after they announce they will attend his opening night, he comes out to them to a chilly reaction. Despite feeling conflicted about Eddie's sexual orientation and the theme of the show, they decide to attend anyway. Watching the show they have a change of heart and come to accept the fact that Eddie is gay.

At the end of the opening show, Charles presents Paul with flowers and they kiss, starting a relationship, and Eddie's parents make amends with him.

== Partial cast ==
- Lena Hall as Wife / Eve
- Daniel Robinson as Paul / Adam
- Joey Dudding as Eddie / Steve
- Jeff Metzler as David
- Casper Andreas as Usher
- Liz McCartney as Patty-Maye
- Edward Miller as Stage Manager
- Brian Spitulnik as Michael
- Andre Ward as Jose
- Steve Hayes as God
- Jim Newman as Bruce
- John Hillner as Benny
- Michael Schiffman as Charles
- Marty Thomas as Dorothy
- Kate Pazakis as herself
- Michael Musto as himself
- Jack Aaronson as himself
- Brent Corrigan as Hustler
- Rick Crom as Drunk

== Production ==
The directors chose to cast openly gay Broadway actors for all the film's key roles. Principle filming began October 24, 2008. Cast includes theatre veterans, Liz McCartney, Jim Newman, Joey Dudding, Marty Thomas, Andre Ward, Daniel Robinson, Jeff Metzler, Brian Spitulnik, Josh Cruz, Lena Hall and Steve Hayes, and features the choreography of Shea Sullivan with songs written by Rick Crom. It was the first feature film for stage actors Daniel Robinson and Joey Dudding. The two leads were at first concerned with the manner in which sex scenes were to be handled in the film, with Robinson originally turning down the role. He is reported as stating, "It was a little too over the top for me. I wasn't comfortable with the sex scene[s] and the nudity. It was too nude and gay for me." He expanded, "A huge reason why I didn't take the film in the first place was that I didn't want to be seen as a gay actor. Big Gay Musical was like putting a tattoo on my body." He eventually decided the film was a good opportunity, and in looking back on the production, acknowledged that the sex scene "was harder to read than to do." Another of his early concerns were fears about having his naked body exposed on film forever. Robinson and Dudding both offered that the most difficult aspect to their respective roles was portraying two different characters with different story lines and motivations within the same film.

== Critical response ==
In speaking about the film, Variety wrote of one of the film's many segments, and made special note of one dealing with Genesis, by writing that "Seldom has blasphemy been so entertaining, and if only Caruso were capable of sustaining such wit (and energy, as agile lensing and editing keep things lively), the movie could have stuck to documenting his stage show." They expanded on flaws by writing "subsequent numbers stall, with lame caricatures of Tammy Faye Bakker and long stretches at an ex-gay conversion camp offset by an eye-candy male cast parading about in hot pants and angel wings." The added that to the film's credit, "the directors insisted on casting openly gay Broadway actors in all the key roles, trading the usual daytime-soap-caliber cast of equivalently low-budget, L.A.-produced gay fare for multitalents with real singing and dancing chops." They concluded that the film was "more than adequate for festival and DVD consumption."

After Elton shared that the film's structure is "a little unusual" in that after the prologue the film opens with "a rather extended musical and dance number from a preview performance of a stage play, Adam & Steve Just the Way God Made Em, which tells the story of the Bible from a decidedly gay perspective." They called the film "a surprisingly pleasant romp," writing that "this little gay musical has what seems to be about two full months of flawless preview performances!"

New York Cool reviewer Frank J. Avella wrote that his first response was negative, but when he read of the involvement of Casper Andreas in the project he became more interested in the film and learned, contrary to his original impression, "no one breaks into song without a good reason." Avella made special note of how the storyline revolves around the players and cast of the stageplay Adam and Steve Just the Way God Made Them, a musical production within the film itself which presents the Genesis creation narrative from a gay perspective. He wrote "The film continuously and cleverly returns to the stage show, using it as a framing device of sorts" as a means to underscore the film's greater story of acceptance-of-self. In summarizing, the reviewer offered that "production values are terrific and the ensemble is, for the most part, admirable". He wrote that Daniel Robinson was "quite impressive" and his slut song "brings down the house", but expanded that Joey Dudding playing a "sweet and sensitive Eddie" truly moves the audience by giving an accurate portrayal of a guy on the cusp of coming out.

== Awards ==
Merlinka festival International Queer Film Festival, Belgrade Serbia - Best Queer Film

== Release ==
The film first screened July 20, 2009, at the Philadelphia Q Fest and had its official theatrical premiere August 9, 2009, in Provincetown, Massachusetts, before screenings at multiple LGBT film festivals through 2009 and 2010.

== Soundtrack ==
The soundtrack of the film was scheduled for release on July 14, 2009. The CD includes all the original music from the film as well as some contemporary tracks that were also featured in the movie.

The songs featured in the soundtrack were written by Rick Crom, Fred M. Caruso and Jack Aaronson.

1, "Overture"
2, "Creation"
3, "The Party Isn't Over"
4, "Eve's Lament"
5, "Christian Medley"
6, "I Will Change"
7, "I Wanna Be a Slut"
8, "I'm Gonna Go Straight"

9, "Someone to Sing Me a Love Song"
10, "Musical Theatre Love"
11, "Someone Up There"
12, "God Loves Gays"
13, "As I AM"
14, "Finale"
15, "I Am Alone"
