= Randy Harrison =

American actor (born 1977)

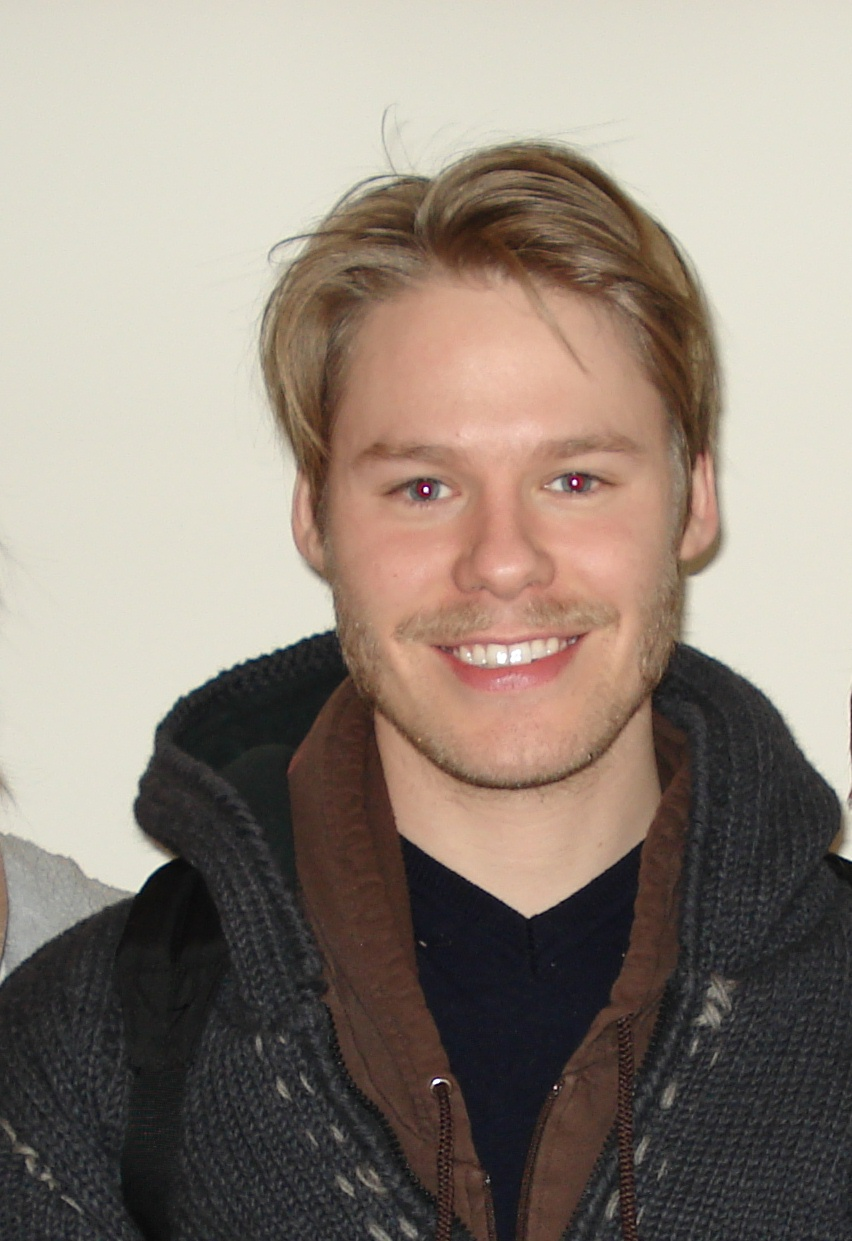
- Harrison in 2007
- Born: November 2, 1977 (age 48); Nashua, New Hampshire, U.S.
- Education: University of Cincinnati (BFA)
- Occupation: Actor
- Years active: 1985–present

Randolph Clarke Harrison (born November 2, 1977) is an American actor best known for his portrayal of Justin Taylor on the Showtime drama Queer as Folk.

== Early life and college ==
Harrison was born in Nashua, New Hampshire, where he starting acting early. He attended Bicentennial Elementary School and starred as Peter Pan in the school play. He was also active in the Actorsingers and played Winthrop in a 1987 production of The Music Man. He moved to Alpharetta, Georgia, with his family at age eleven. He attended Pace Academy, a private prep school in Atlanta. His father is an executive with a large paper company, while he has described his mother as a "thwarted artist." His only sibling, an older brother, is a bank manager.

Harrison attended the University of Cincinnati's College-Conservatory of Music (CCM), graduating with a Bachelor of Fine Arts degree in musical theatre. During his time at CCM, Harrison starred in university productions such as Hello Again, Shopping and Fucking, and Children of Eden. He also had roles in other theatrical venues across the U.S., in productions such as Violet at the Ensemble Theatre of Cincinnati, 1776 at the St. Louis Municipal Theatre and West Side Story at the Forestburg Playhouse, as well as productions of A Midsummer Night's Dream, The Real Inspector Hound and A Cheever Evening.

== Career ==
Harrison made his television debut playing Justin Taylor, a gay teen, in 2000's American version of Queer as Folk, based on the British television series. The series ran for five seasons, ending in 2005. In 2002, Harrison played the character Sean in Bang Bang You're Dead, a made-for-television movie based on the play of the same name. Harrison stars as Brutus in cinematographer/director/writer Patrick Donelley's postmodern feature film adaptation of Julius Caesar opposite actor John Shea as the title role.

In 2002, Harrison starred in the play Deviant by Sophie Rand at the New York International Fringe Festival. In summer 2004, Harrison made his Broadway debut as Boq in the musical Wicked. His Off Broadway credits include A Letter for Ethel Kennedy by Christopher Gorman (MCC Theater, 2002), the Father in Oak Tree (Perry Street Theatre, 2006), Young Spencer in Edward II (Red Bull Theatre, 2007–08), Eros in Antony and Cleopatra (Theatre for a New Audience, 2008), Laszlo Fickes/Gerhardt Zeitzler in A Singing Forest (Public Theatre, 2009), and Kevin Adams-Weller in Harbor (Primary Stages, 2013). Harrison has also done several staged readings for Red Bull Theatre and starred in their "In the Raw" workshop production of A Tyger's Heart in February 2011.

Harrison has a substantial résumé in regional theatre, most prominently as a featured player since 2005 at the Berkshire Theatre Festival. Roles with BTF include Alan Strang in Equus (2005), the title role in Amadeus (2006), Bill Bibbit in One Flew Over the Cuckoo's Nest (2007), Frank Gardner in Mrs. Warren's Profession (2007), Lucky in Waiting for Godot (2008), Osvald Alving in Ghosts (2009), Nagg in Endgame (2010), and the title character in The Who's "Tommy" (2011). Other regional theatre credits include Lysander/Thisbe/Cobweb in the Alabama Shakespeare Festival production of A Midsummer Night's Dream, presented in spring 2006 by the SITI Company (where Harrison has studied extensively through Skidmore College and in Manhattan); Tom in the Guthrie Theater's production of The Glass Menagerie (2007); Andy Warhol in the Yale Repertory Theatre's production of Pop! (2009); Sebastian in the Shakespeare Theatre Company's production of Twelfth Night (2010); Tim in the Studio Theatre's production of Habit of Art; and Ken in the George Street Playhouse's production of Red (2012).

In 2006, Harrison co-founded the Arts Bureau (tAB), an umbrella organization encompassing theatre, film, music, and writing. In July 2007, he starred in tAB's first production, a heartwarming story, ultimately, based on the work of Anton Chekhov. In late 2007/early 2008, Harrison shot and starred in the first tAB short film, Thinking, which has been shown at several film festivals. In Summer 2008, tAB shot its first feature film Lorton Lake.

In 2024, Harrison announced he had decided to leave the public eye and change careers to become a therapist.

== Personal life ==
Harrison, who is gay, dated Advertising Age columnist Simon Dumenco from 2002 to 2008; the two met when Dumenco interviewed Harrison for a New York magazine cover story. As of December 2009, Harrison lived in Williamsburg, Brooklyn, with his cats Ella and Aggie.

== Filmography ==
=== Television ===
| Year | Title | Role | Notes |
|---|---|---|---|
| 2000 – 2005 | Queer as Folk | Justin Taylor | Main cast; 83 episodes |
| 2015 | Mr. Robot | Harry | Recurring role |
| 2017 | New York is Dead | Clipboard Guy/... | Recurring role; 5 episodes |

=== Film ===
| Year | Title | Role | Notes |
|---|---|---|---|
| 2002 | Bang Bang You're Dead | Sean | Television film |
| 2008 | Thinking... | "Boy" | |
| 2010 | Julius Caesar | Brutus | |
| 2011 | Lorton Lake | | |
| 2012 | Gayby | Barman | Cameo appearance |
| 2014 | Such Good People | Alex Reardon | |
| 2015 | Sam & Julia | Sam | |
| 2015 | Photo OP | Jacob | |

== Theater ==
| Year | Title | Role | Notes |
|---|---|---|---|
| 1985 | Oliver | Child Chorus | Actorsingers, Nashua, NH |
| 1987 | Music Man | Winthrop | Actorsingers, Nashua, NH |
| | Hello Again | Young Thing | University of Cincinnati College-Conservatory of Music (CCM) |
| | Shopping and Fucking | Robbie | University of Cincinnati College-Conservatory of Music (CCM) |
| | Children of Eden | Abel | University of Cincinnati College-Conservatory of Music (CCM) |
| | The Hot Mikado | Gentleman from Japan | University of Cincinnati College-Conservatory of Music (CCM) |
| | Rags | | University of Cincinnati College-Conservatory of Music (CCM) |
| 1999 | Violet | Billy Dean | Ensemble Theater of Cincinnati |
| 1999 | 1776 | The Courier | St. Louis Municipal Theater |
| | Grease | | St. Louis Municipal Theater |
| | Anything Goes | | St. Louis Municipal Theater |
| | West Side Story | Action | Forestburg Playhouse |
| | Joseph and the Amazing Technicolor Dreamcoat | Benjamin | Forestburg Playhouse |
| | Babes in Arms | Lee Calhoun | Forestburg Playhouse |
| | Cabaret | | Forestburg Playhouse |
| | The Real Inspector Hound | | |
| | A Cheever Evening | | |
| 2002 | Deviant | Marshall | NY Fringe Festival - Kiva Company |
| 2004 | Wicked | Boq | Broadway |
| 2005 | Equus | Alan Strang | Berkshire Theatre Festival |
| 2006 | A Midsummer Night's Dream | Lysander/Thisbe/Cobweb | |
| 2006 | Amadeus | Wolfgang Amadeus Mozart | Berkshire Theatre Festival |
| 2006 | An Oak Tree | The father | |
| | A Letter From Ethel Kennedy | | |
| 2007 | The Glass Menagerie | Young Tom | Guthrie Theater |
| 2007 | One Flew Over the Cuckoo's Nest | Billy Bibbit | Berkshire Theatre Festival |
| 2007 | Mrs. Warren's Profession | Frank Gardner | Berkshire Theatre Festival |
| 2007/2008 | Edward the Second | Young Spencer | |
| 2008 | Antony and Cleopatra | Eros | April/May |
| 2008 | Waiting for Godot | Lucky | Summer; Berkshire Theatre Festival |
| 2009 | The Singing Forest | Laszlo Fickes/Gerhardt Zeitzler | April/May; The Public Theater |
| 2009 | Ghosts | Oswald | Summer; Berkshire Theatre Festival |
| 2009 | POP! | Andy Warhol | Fall; Yale Repertory Theatre |
| 2010 | Caligula by Albert Camus | Scipio | January; Red Bull Theatre Revelations Reading |
| 2010 | Endgame | Nagg | Summer; Berkshire Theatre Festival |
| 2011 | The Who's Tommy | Tommy | Summer; Berkshire Theatre Festival |
| 2011 | The Habit of Art | Tim | Fall; The Studio Theatre |
| 2012 | Red | Ken | January 31 – February 26 at George Street Playhouse; March 23 – April 4 at Allen Theatre, Cleveland |
| 2012 | Silence! The Musical | Dr. Chilton | July 18 – September 9 at Elektra Theater, NYC |
| 2013 | Harbor | Kevin | July 23 – September 8 by Primary Stages at 59E59 Theaters, NYC |
| 2014 | Atomic Musical | Paul Tibbets and Edward Teller | June 26 – August 16; The Acorn Theatre at Theatre Row |
| 2014 | Amadeus | Wolfgang Amadeus Mozart | October 9–26 Ensemble Theater Co. at The New Vic, Santa Barbara, CA |
| 2016 | Cabaret | Emcee | January 26, 2016 - February 19, 2017, Roundabout Theater Co. Nat'l Tour |
| 2017 | Sunday in the Park with George | George | June 17 – August 20, 2017 Guthrie Theater |
| 2017 | Rocky Horror Show | Frank-N-Furter | October 13–29, 2017 Bucks County Playhouse |
| 2018 | Angels in America | Prior Walter | April 17 – July 22, 2018; Berkeley Rep |
| 2018 | Christmas on the Rocks | Tiny Tim, Charlie Brown, Ralphie, Hermie | Nov 27 – December 23, 2018; Theater Works Hartford |
| 2019 | Cabaret | Emcee | Jul 17 – August 10, 2019 Ogunquit Playhouse |
| 2021 | Cock | John | Studio Theatre |
| 2022 | ...what the end will be | Charles | May 12 – July 10, 2022 Laura Pels Theatre |
