= Slutty Summer =

- Directed by: Casper Andreas
- Written by: Casper Andreas
- Produced by: Casper Andreas
- Starring: Casper Andreas; Jesse Archer; Christos Klapsis
- Cinematography: Jon Fordham
- Edited by: Casper Andreas
- Music by: Scott Starrett
- Distributed by: Embrem Entertainment
- Release dates: June 11, 2004 (New York Lesbian and Gay Film Festival); June 10, 2005 (United States)
- Running time: 85 minutes
- Country: United States
- Language: English
- Box office: $21,520

Slutty Summer is a 2004 romantic comedy film written and directed by Casper Andreas. It stars Casper Andreas, Jesse Archer, and Christos Klapsis. The film was premiered at the New York Lesbian and Gay Film Festival on June 11, 2004, and was shown at various other film festivals before its release in the United States on June 10, 2005.

== Plot ==
Hunky writer Markus returns home to find his boyfriend of four years naked with another man. Newly single, he begins waiting tables at a swinging Chelsea hotspot where the indelible supporting cast of co-workers offers conflicting directions on the off-road map to love and lust in New York City.

== Cast ==
- Casper Andreas as Markus
- Christos Klapsis as Julian
- Virginia Bryan as Marilyn
- Jeffrey Christopher Todd as Peter
- Lance Werth as Kevin
- Jesse Archer as Luke
- Jamie Hatchett as Tyler
- Lex Sosa as Steven
- J.R. Rolley as Derek
- Christophe Fraire as Peter's date
- Colin Houston as Adam
- Nick Toren as Larry

== Reception ==
On review aggregator website Rotten Tomatoes, the film has a 11% approval rating based on 9 reviews, with an average ranking of 3.5/10. On Metacritic, Slutty Summer have a rank of 31 out of a 100 based on 7 critics, indicating "generally unfavorable reviews".

Matt Singer of The Village Voice wrote "First-timer Casper Andreas approaches his subject with the subtlety of a wrecking ball".

Writing for The New York Times, Ned Martel called the film "a labor of love".
