= Paul Morrison (artist) =

British painter

Phytochrome by Paul Morrison, 2008

Paul Morrison is a British artist. He was born in Liverpool and received a BA in fine art from Sheffield City Polytechnic. He continued his studies at Goldsmiths College of Art in London, where he received his MA. His first one-person show was in London in 1996 and since then he has exhibited extensively in museums and galleries Worldwide. Morrison lives and works in Yorkshire.

He was shortlisted for the Jerwood Painting Prize exhibition and was a prizewinner and subsequently a juror in the John Moores Painting Prize.

His work has been the subject of numerous solo exhibitions including Inverleith House, Royal Botanic Garden, Edinburgh, UK (1999), Carpenter Center for the Visual Arts, Harvard University, Cambridge, MA (2000), UCLA Hammer Museum of Art, Los Angeles, CA (2000), Wallworks Aspen Art Museum, Aspen, CO (2001), Artspace, Auckland, New Zealand (2001), Chloroplast, Southampton City Art Gallery, Hampshire, UK and Kunsthalle Nürnberg, Nürnberg, Germany (2002), Mesophylle, Magasin, Grenoble, France (2002), Haematoxylon, Irish Museum of Modern Art, Dublin, Ireland (2003), Saxifraga, Galleria d’Arte Moderna e Contemporanea, Bergamo, Italy (2003), The Contemporary Museum, Honolulu, HI (2006), Bloomberg Space, London, UK (2007), Museum of Art, Rhode Island School of Design, Providence, RI (2008), Las Vegas Art Museum, Las Vegas, NV (2008), Manchester Art Gallery, Manchester, UK (2009), The Horticultural Society of New York Gallery, New York, NY (2009), Florigen, Fondazione Volume, Rome, Italy, (2011), Auctorum, Millennium Gallery, Sheffield, UK (2012), Open Eye Gallery, Liverpool, UK (2014) and Stadtgalerie, Saarbrücken, Germany (2017).

Morrison has participated in many group exhibitions including Surfacing, Institute of Contemporary Arts, London, UK (1998), Trouble Spot. Painting, (curated by Luc Tuymans & Narcisse Tordoir), Museum van Hedendaagse Kunst, Antwerp, Belgium (1999), Colour Me Blind!, Württembergischer Kunstverein, Stuttgart (1999), Twisted: Urban and Visionary Landscapes, Stedelijk Van Abbemuseum, Eindhoven, Netherlands (2000), I Believe in Dürer, Kunsthalle Nürnberg, Nürnberg, Germany (2000), SchattenRisse: Silhoueten und Cutouts, Lenbachhaus, Munich, Germany (2001), en pleine terre. Wandering between Landscape and Art, Spiral Jetty and Potsdamer Schrebergårten, Museum für Gegenwartskunst, Basel; curated by Bernhard Mendes Bürgi (2001), Effetto Natura, Fondazione Nicola Trussardi, Milan; curated by Mariuccia Casadio, Italy (2001), Extreme Connoisseurship, Fogg Art Museum, Cambridge, MA; curated by Linda Norden (2001), Melodrama, ARTIUM, Centro-Museo Vasco de Arte Contemporarneo, Vitoria, toured to the Palacio de los Condoes de Gabia/Centro Jose Guerroe, Granada, Spain (2002), Sphere, The Sir John Soane’s Museum, London, UK (2002), Interview with Painting, Fondazione Bevilacqua La Masa, Venice, Italy (2003), Panorámica Programme, Museo Tamayo Arte Contemporáneo, Mexico City, Mexico (2003), Flower Power, Musee de Beaux-Arts, Lille, France (2003), Art of the Garden, Tate Britain, London, UK (2004), Rose C’est La Vie, Tel Aviv Museum, Tel Aviv, Israel (2004), The Boros Collection, ZKM Museum für Neue Kunst, Karlsruhe, Germany (2004), Why Not Live for Art, Tokyo Opera City Art Gallery, Tokyo, Japan (2004), Flowers Observed, Flowers Transformed, the Andy Warhol Museum, Pittsburgh, PA (2004), Satellite, ArtNow Lightbox, Tate Britain, London, UK (2004), The Flower as Image, Louisiana Museum of Modern Art, Humlebæk, Denmark (2004), Private View 1980/2000: Collection Pierre Huber, Musée cantonal des Beaux-Arts, Lausanne, Switzerland (2006), Boys and Flowers, Western Bridge, Seattle, WA (2006), Eye on Europe: Prints, books & multiples / 1960 to now, The Museum of Modern Art, New York, NY (2006), Constellations II, Städel Museum, Frankfurt, Germany (2007), Repicturing the Past/Picturing the Present, The Museum Of Modern Art, New York, NY (2007), The Enchanted Garden, Auckland Art Gallery, Auckland, NZ (2008), Supernatural, CCA Andratx, Mallorca, Spain (2008), WALL ROCKETS: Contemporary Artists and Ed Ruscha, curated by Lisa Dennison, The FLAG Art Foundation, New York, NY, toured to Albright Knox Art Gallery, Buffalo, NY (2008-9), Flower Power, CRAA Centro Ricerca Arte Attuale, Verbania, Italy (2009), Le sang d’un poète (Blood of a poet), Hangar à bananes, Nantes, France (part of Estuaire Nantes, France Saint-Nazaire biennale) (2009), WONDERLAND – Through the looking glass, curated by Robbert Roos, KadE, Amersfoort, Netherlands (2009), Murals, Fundació Joan Miró, Barcelona, Spain (2010), PHILAGRAFIKA, Moore College Gallery, Philadelphia, PA (2010), Layers: John Moores Contemporary Painting Prize, Seongnam Arts Centre, Korea (2010), Nothing is forever, South London Gallery, London, UK (2010), Dark Matters, Whitworth Art Gallery, Manchester, UK (2011), Gold, Belvedere, Vienna, Austria (2012), Dancing Towards the Essence, Kunsthaus Grenchen, Switzerland (2012), Under the Greenwood: Picturing British Trees – Present, St Barbe Museum, Lymington, UK (2013), Post Pop: East Meets West, Saatchi Gallery, London, UK (2014), The Real Face of Burns, Robert Burns Birthplace Museum, Ayr, Scotland (2015), The Romantic Thread in British Art, Southampton City Art Gallery, UK (2016) and Beautifully transient. Flowers in Contemporary Art, Kallmann Museum, Ismaning, Germany (2017). '
