= Marcus Patrick =

English actor (born 1974)

- Born: Patrick Marcus Osborne; 5 June 1974 (age 52); Bath, Somerset, England
- Occupations: Actor, model, singer, film director
- Years active: 1995–present
- Spouses: Cynthia Wales (m. 2000 d.2006); Nikki Torres (m. 2015-present)

Marcus Patrick (born Patrick Marcus Osborne; 5 June 1974 in Bath, Somerset) is an English actor, model, singer and film director.

== Acting career ==
Patrick has appeared in such American television series as My Wife & Kids, CSI: Miami and Passions. From 29 June to 25 September 2006, he was part of the cast of the long-running soap opera All My Children playing the role of Jamal Cudahy. He has also played the lead role in an independent film "I Do, I Did" (2009).

Patrick announced on 13 September 2006, that he has left his role on All My Children, due to creative differences with the show. He is also on The-N television show, Beyond The Break.

On 11 May 2007, it was announced that he had joined the cast of Days of Our Lives in the role of Jett Carver. His first air date was 1 June. However, after five months he was fired. NBC declined to comment on the reasons for this, and his last appearance aired on 14 November 2007. Patrick himself has expressed the view that his dismissal was a consequence of an explicit photo shoot he completed in the September 2007 edition of Playgirl Magazine and the magazine website. Unusual for celebrity subjects, Patrick elected to pose full frontally nude for several shots, in darkened silhouette. He has also appeared on Just Jordan. Marcus reported to H8terade Radio in 2010, that he was unaware that full frontal would be shown, and even went as far as saying that Playgirl ruined his career.

Marcus Patrick posed in front of the camera again for the book "And Then I Died" by author and photographer Quar Brown, a true story told through the visuals of 62 models and Patrick's image was selected as the cover model for the book.

In 2012, he was featured in RnB Ashanti's music video for the song The Woman You Love.

== Music career ==
Aside from acting, Patrick has had a singing career, firstly with the boyband Worlds Apart and then as a solo singer.

== Personal life ==
Patrick married his high school sweetheart Cynthia Wales (26 October 1973) on 1 January 2000. Patrick filed for divorce from Wales on 24 April 2006 after 6 years of marriage. The divorce was finalised on 10 June 2006.
