= List of LGBTQ-related films of 2013 =

This is a list of lesbian, gay, bisexual, transgender or queer-related films released in 2013. It contains theatrically released films that deal with important gay, lesbian, bisexual, transgender or queer characters or issues and may have same-sex romance or relationships as a plot device.

== Films ==
Title	Director	Country	Genre	Cast	Notes	Ref
52 Tuesdays	Sophie Hyde	Australia	Drama	Tilda Cobham-Hervey, Del Herbert-Jane	Coming of age story about a teenage girl dealing with a transgender mother who is transitioning to become a man.	
A Fold in My Blanket	Zaza Rusadze	Georgia	Drama	Tornike Bziava, Tornike Gogrichiani		
Adult World	Scott Coffey	United States	Comedy	Emma Roberts, John Cusack, Evan Peters, Armando Riesco, Shannon Woodward, Chris Riggi, Scott Coffey		
Age 17 (17 anni)	Filippo Demarchi	Switzerland	Short, drama	Fabio Foiada, Ignazio Oliva, Laura Minazzi, Kevin Martinetti		
Aleksandr's Price	Pau Masó	United States	Drama	Pau Masó, Josh Berresford, Anatoli Grek		
American Vagabond	Susanna Helke	Finland	Documentary	James Temple, Tyler Johnson		
Ashley	Dean Ronalds	United States	Drama	Nicole Fox, Nicole Buehrer, Jennifer Taylor, Michael Madsen, Tom Malloy		
Bambi	Sébastien Lifshitz	France	Documentary	Marie-Pierre Pruvot	Winner of the 2013 Teddy Award for Best Documentary Film	
Before You Know It	PJ Raval	United States	Documentary	Dennis Creamer, Ty Martin, Robert Mainor, Dixie Monroe, Carly Davin Nation	Follows 3 Gay American senior citizens	
Behind the Candelabra	Steven Soderbergh	United States	Drama	Matt Damon, Michael Douglas	Aired as a television film in the United States, but was screened theatrically in Europe.	
Black Box	Stephen Cone	United States	Drama	Josephine Decker, Austin Pendleton		
Blue Is the Warmest Colour (La Vie d'Adèle – Chapitres 1 & 2)	Abdellatif Kechiche	France; Belgium; Spain	Drama	Adèle Exarchopoulos, Léa Seydoux, Salim Kechiouche, Aurélien Recoing, Catherine Salée, Benjamin Siksou	Won the Palme d'Or at Cannes	
Boygame	Anna Nolskog	Sweden	Short, comedy, drama, romance	Charlie Gustafsson, Joakim Lang, Sophie Adolfsson, Palmira Koukkari Mbenga, Felicia Löwerdahl	15 mins long and was on the Iris Prize Shortlist in 2014	
Breaking the Girls	Jamie Babbit	United States	Crime, thriller	Agnes Bruckner, Madeline Zima, Shawn Ashmore, Kate Levering, Shanna Collins		
Bridegroom	Linda Bloodworth-Thomason	United States	Documentary	Shane Bitney Crone, Tom Bridegroom	Winner of the Audience Award for Best Documentary at the 2013 Tribeca Film Festival	
Burger	Magnus Mork	United Kingdom; Norway	Short, drama	Zaman Ahmadi, Akram Akbari, Matthew Ashford	11 mins long	
Cal	Christian Martin	United Kingdom	Drama	Wayne Virgo, Tom Payne, Emily Corcoran, Lucy Russell, Simon Cook		
Caged (Uitgesproken)	Dylan Tonk, Lazlo Tonk	Netherlands	Short, drama	Joël Mellenberg, Josha Stradowski, Yldau de Boer, Leendert de Ridder	13 mins long	
Coming Out	Dénes Orosz	Hungary	Comedy	Sándor Csányi, Kátya Tompos		
Concussion	Stacie Passon	United States	Drama	Robin Weigert, Maggie Siff	Winner of the 2013 Teddy Award Jury Prize.	
Continental	Malcolm Ingram	United States	Documentary	Jaye P. Morgan, Holly Woodlawn, Michael Musto, Frankie Knuckles, Sarah Dash		
Contracted	Eric England	United States	Horror	Najarra Townsend, Caroline Williams, Alice Macdonald		
Cruise Patrol	Bobby de Groot, Arjan van Meerten	Netherlands	Animation, short, action, fantasy, sci-fi		8 mins long, Won awards at Sydney Film Festival 2015, New Media Film Festival 2014, ShortCutz Amsterdam 2015	
Dallas Buyers Club	Jean-Marc Vallée	United States	Drama	Matthew McConaughey, Jared Leto, Jennifer Garner, Denis O'Hare, Steve Zahn, Michael O'Neill, Dallas Roberts, Griffin Dunne, Kevin Rankin, Bradford Cox, Scott Takeda	Based on the life of Ron Woodroof	
The Dog	Allison Berg, Frank Keraudren	United States	Documentary	John Wojtowicz, Carmen Bifulco, Jeremy Bowker	Documentary about John Wojtowicz, whose story inspired the fiction film Dog Day Afternoon	
Eastern Boys	Robin Campillo	France	Drama	Olivier Rabourdin, Kirill Emelyanov, Danil Vorobyev		
Exposed	Beth B	United States	Documentary	Julie Atlas Muz, Mat Fraser, Bunny Love, Dirty Martini, James Habacker, Bambi the Mermaid and Rose Wood	eight women and men (including disabled, transgender) using their naked bodies for burlesque	
Facing Fear	Jason Cohen	United States	Short Documentary	Matthew Boger, Tim Zaal	former neo-Nazi and his gay victim meet 25 years later, was a nominee for the 86th Academy Awards	
The Firefly (La Luciérnaga)	Ana Maria Hermida	Colombia; United States	Drama, romance, fantasy	Olga Segura, Carolina Guerra, Manuel José Chávez, Andrés Aranburo	After the sudden death of her estranged brother, Lucia accidentally meets his fiancée and falls in love with her.	
Floating Skyscrapers	Tomasz Wasilewski	Poland	Drama	Mateusz Banasiuk, Bartosz Gelner		
Free Fall	Stephan Lacant	Germany	Drama	Hanno Koffler, Max Riemelt, Katharina Schüttler	a.k.a. Freier Fall	
Fuoristrada	Elisa Amoruso	Italy	Documentary	Marioara Dadiloveanu; Giuseppe Della Pelle	Italian documentary, also known as "Off Road", about the transgender mechanic and a rally rides champion Beatrice, her relationship with Marianna and their common life.	
Five Dances	Alan Brown	United States	Drama	Ryan Steele, Reed Luplau, Catherine Miller		
G.B.F.	Darren Stein	United States	Comedy	Sasha Pieterse, Natasha Lyonne. Evanna Lynch, Megan Mullally, Andrea Bowen, Joanna "JoJo" Levesque, Xosha Roquemore, Horatio Sanz, Paul Iacono, and Michael J. Willett		
Geography Club	Gary Entin	United States	Comedy	Cameron Deane Stewart, Justin Deeley, Meaghan Martin, Allie Gonino, Nikki Blonsky, Andrew Caldwell, Marin Hinkle, Ana Gasteyer, Scott Bakula	Based on the young adult novel of the same name by Brent Hartinger	
Gerontophilia	Bruce LaBruce	Canada	Drama	Walter Borden, Pier-Gabriel Lajoie, Marie-Hélène Thibault, Katie Boland		
Girl, Boy, Bakla, Tomboy	Wenn V. Deramas	Philippines	Comedy	Vice Ganda, Maricel Soriano		
The Happy Sad	Rodney Evans	United States	Drama	Leroy McClain, Sorel Carradine, Charlie Bennett	Screenplay by Ken Urban, based on his stage play of the same name	
Harmonica's Howl	Bruno Safadi	Brazil	Drama	Leandra Leal, Jiddú Pinheiro, Mariana Ximenes		
Hawaii	Marco Berger	Argentina	Romance	Manuel Vignau, Mateo Chiarino		
Human Warmth (Chaleur humaine)	Christophe Predari	Belgium	Short, drama, romance	Thomas Coumans, Adrien Desbons	11 mins long	
I Do	Glenn Gaylord	United States	Drama	David W. Ross, Jamie-Lynn Sigler, Grant Bowler, Alicia Witt, Maurice Compte	General release; premiered on festival circuit in 2012.	
I Love Hooligans	Jan-Dirk Bouw	Netherlands; Belgium	Animation, short, biography		13 min long, later added to Boys on Film 14: Worlds Collide (2016)	
I'm So Excited	Pedro Almodóvar	Spain	Comedy	Javier Cámara, Antonio de la Torra, Raúl Arévalo, Carlos Areces, Hugo Silva, Lola Dueñas, Cecilia Roth, Guillermo Toledo, Miguel Ángel Silvestre, Laya Marti, José María Yazpik		
In Bloom	Chris Michael Birkmeier	United States	Drama	Kyle Wigent, Tanner Rittenhouse, Adam Fane		
In the Name of	Małgorzata Szumowska	Poland	Drama	Andrzej Chyra, Mateusz Kosciukiewicz, Maria Maj, Maja Ostaszewska, Tomasz Schuchardt, Łukasz Simlat	Winner of the 2013 Teddy Award for Best Feature Film.	
Interior. Leather Bar.	James Franco, Travis Mathews	United States	Docudrama	Val Lauren, Christian Patrick, James Franco, Travis Mathews	Reimagining of the 40 minutes of deleted footage from the 1980 film Cruising	
Kill Your Darlings	John Krokidas	United States	Drama	Daniel Radcliffe, Elizabeth Olsen, Dane DeHaan, Michael C. Hall, Ben Foster, Jack Huston, Jennifer Jason Leigh, John Cullum, David Rasche, Kyra Sedgwick, Zach Appelman	Fictionalized account of the killing in Riverside Park	
Kissing Darkness	James Townsend	United States	Horror, thriller	Ronnie Kroell, Sean Paul Lockhart		
Kissing Drew	Philip J. Connell	Canada	Short, drama	Eden Ocean Sanders, Ben Hargreaves, Chris Handfield	9 mins long	
A Last Farewell (Ett sista farväl)	Casper Andreas	Sweden	Short, drama, family	Tomas von Brömssen, Iwar Wiklander, Liv Mjönes	13 mins long	
Little Gay Boy	Antony Hickling	France	Drama	Gaëtan Vettier, Manuel Blanc, Amanda Dawson		
Love U Man	B B Phuyal	Nepal	Drama, horror	Raz Aryan, Sures Chaudhary and Pranisha Silwal	Also called 'Love You Man', first Nepalese gay film	
Me, Myself and Mum	Guillaume Gallienne	France	Comedy	Guillaume Gallienne, André Marcon, Françoise Fabian	Based on Gallienne's autobiographical stage show Les Garçons et Guillaume, à table !	
Monster Pies	Lee Galea	Australia	Romantic drama	Tristan Barr, Lucas Linehan		
My Child	Can Candan	Turkey	Family, drama, documentary	LİSTAG players (Istanbul group of Families of LGBT)		
My Prairie Home	Chelsea McMullan	Canada	Documentary	Rae Spoon		
Nordland	Ingo J. Biermann	Germany	Drama	Odine Johne, Maren Hoff, John Sigurd Kristensen, Burri-Taka Bolalima, Ingrid Lode, Nora G. Svalheim, Olena Tretyak-Godinaud		
Nymphomaniac	Lars von Trier	United Kingdom; Denmark; Belgium; France; Germany	Drama	Charlotte Gainsbourg, Stellan Skarsgård, Stacy Martin, Shia LaBeouf, Christian Slater, Jamie Bell, Uma Thurman, Willem Dafoe, Mia Goth, Sophie Kennedy Clark, Connie Nielsen, Michaël Pas, Jean-Marc Barr, Udo Kier		
Open Up to Me	Simo Halinen	Finland	Drama	Leea Klemola, Peter Franzén, Ria Kataja		
Out	Jeremy LaLonde	Canada	Short comedy-drama	David Tompa, David Huband, Rosemary Doyle, Paula Brancati, Tommie-Amber Pirie		
The Package (O Pacote)	Rafael Aidar	Brazil	Short, drama, romance	Jefferson Brito, Victor Monteiro, Thaís Oliveira	18 min long	
Philomena	Stephen Frears	United Kingdom	Drama	Judi Dench, Steve Coogan, Michelle Fairley, Barbara Jefford, Anna Maxwell Martin, Mare Winningham	Based on the book The Lost Child of Philomena Lee by Martin Sixsmith	
Pit Stop	Yen Tan	United States	Drama	Bill Heck, Marcus DeAnda, Amy Seimetz, Alfredo Maduro		
Quick Change	Eduardo Roy Jr.	Philippines	Drama	Mimi Juareza, Jun-Jun Quintana, Miggs Quaderno		
Reaching for the Moon	Bruno Barreto	Brazil	Drama, romance	Glória Pires, Miranda Otto, Tracy Middendorf	Based on the book Flores Raras e Banalíssimas (Rare and Commonplace Flowers) by Carmem Lucia de Oliveira	
Side Effects	Steven Soderbergh	United States	Drama, thriller	Jude Law, Rooney Mara, Channing Tatum, Catherine Zeta-Jones, Vinessa Shaw, Ann Dowd, Polly Draper, David Costabile, Mamie Gummer, Scott Shepherd, Marin Ireland, Elizabeth Rodriguez		
Spooners	Bryan Horch	United States	Short, comedy, romance, sci-fi	Walter Replogle, Ben Lerman, Richard Ballon, Nathan Tetreault	14 min long, it was part funded on kickstarter.com	
Stranger by the Lake	Alain Guiraudie	France	Drama	Pierre Deladonchamps, Christophe Paou, Patrick d'Assumçao	Won the Queer Palm at Cannes	
Tattoo (Tatuagem)	Hilton Lacerda	Brazil	Comedy, drama	Jesuíta Barbosa, Irandhir Santos, Rodrigo García, Sylvia Prado	Best Picture at the 2013 Festival de Gramado	
Test	Chris Mason Johnson	United States	Drama	Kevin Clarke, Kristoffer Cusick		
Together	James Cook	United Kingdom	Short, horror	Lucas Hansen, Ben Owora, Stuart Evans	22 mins long, later added to Boys on Film 9: Youth in Trouble compilation	
Tom at the Farm (Tom à la ferme)	Xavier Dolan	Canada	Drama	Xavier Dolan, Pierre-Yves Cardinal, Evelyne Brochu, Manuel Tadros, Lise Roy	Adaptation of a play by Michel Marc Bouchard	
Tru Love	Shauna MacDonald, Kate Johnston	Canada	Drama	Shauna MacDonald, Kate Trotter, Christine Horne, Anna Cyzon, Peter MacNeill		
Truth	Rob Moretti	United States	Psychological thriller	Sean Paul Lockhart, Rob Moretti, Blanche Baker		
Vic and Flo Saw a Bear (Vic et Flo ont vu un ours)	Denis Côté	Canada	Drama	Marc-André Grondin, Romane Bohringer, Pierrette Robitaille		
The Violation	Christopher Bradley	United States	Short, drama	Slade Pearce, Elaine Hendrix, Shayne Topp	13 mins long, later added to Boys on Film 14: Worlds Collide compilation	
VIS-à-VIS	Dan Connolly	Australia; United Kingdom	Short, comedy	Belinda Misevski, Dan Connolly, David Harrison, Amy Lehpamer	17 mins long, later added to Boys on Film 13: trick or Treat compilation	
Voyage	Scud	Hong Kong; Taiwan	Drama	Adrian 'Ron' Heung, Sebastian Castro, Byron Pang	An English-language drama about a young psychiatrist from Hong Kong who travels on a luxury boat to meet with his former clients. It contains frequent full-frontal male nudity.	
We Are Animals	Dominic Haxton	United States	Short, sci-fi	Daniel Landroche, Clint Napier, Drew Droege	13 mins long, later added to Boys on Film 11: We Are Animals compilation	
What Now? Remind Me	Joaquim Pinto	Portugal	Documentary	Joaquim Pinto, Nuno Leonel		
Winter Journey (Зимний путь)	Lubov Lvova, Sergey Taramaev	Russia	Drama	Aleksey Frandetti, Evgeniy Tkachuk		
Yeah Kowalski!	Evan Roberts	United States	Short, comedy, romance	Cameron Wofford, Conor Donnelly, Chris Doubek	10 mins long	
