= List of horror films of 2012 =

A list of horror films released in 2012.

Horror films released in 2012
Title	Director	Cast	Country	Notes
100 Bloody Acres	Cameron Cairnes, Colin Cairnes	Damon Herriman, Angus Sampson, Anna McGahan	Australia	Horror comedy
2-Headed Shark Attack	Christopher Douglas Olen Ray	Brooke Hogan, Lauren Perez, Carmen Electra	United States	
3AM 3D	Patchanon Thammajira, Kirati Nak-intanon, Issara Nadee	Focus Jeerakul, Toni Rakkaen, Chakhrit Yamnam	Thailand	
9・9・81	Various	Patitta Attayatamavitaya, Setthasitt Limkasidej, Thiti Vetchabul	Thailand	
12/12/12	Jared Cohn	Sara Malakul Lane, Jesus Guevara, Steve Hanks	United States	
1920: Evil Returns	Bhushuan Patel		India	
The ABCs of Death	Various	Joshua Diolosa, Erik Audé	United States	
The Amazing Adventures of the Living Corpse	Justin Paul Ritter	Michael Vittar, Marshall Hilton, Ryan McGivern	United States	Animated zombie film
American Mary	Jen and Sylvia Soska	Katharine Isabelle, Tristan Risk	Canada; United States	
Apartment 143	Carles Torrens	Kai Lennox, Gia Mantegna, Fiona Glascott	Spain	
Awake in the Woods	Nicholas Boise	Theresa Galeani, Keith Collins, Madelaine Kemp	United States	
Bait	Kimble Rendall	Xavier Samuel, Sharni Vinson, Adrian Pang	Australia; Singapore	
The Barrens	Darren Lynn Bousman	Stephen Moyer, Mia Kirshner, Allie MacDonald	Canada; United States	
The Battery	Jeremy Gardner	Niels Bolle, Adam Cronheim, Alana O'Brien	United States	
The Bay	Barry Levinson	Nansi Aluka, Christopher Denham, Stephen Kunken	United States	
Berberian Sound Studio	Peter Strickland	Toby Jones, Antonio Mancino, Fatma Mohamed	United Kingdom	
Bhoot Returns	Ram Gopal Varma		India	
Bigfoot: The Lost Coast Tapes	Corey Grant	Drew Rausch, Rich McDonald, Ashley Wood	United States	
Blood Stained Shoes	Raymond Yip	Ruby Lin, Kara Hui, Monica Mok	China	
Bloody Bloody Bible Camp	Vito Trabuco	Reggie Bannister, Tim Sullivan, Ron Jeremy	United States	
Bunshinsaba	An Byung-ki	Mei Ting, Guo Jingfei, Wu Chao	China	
The Cabin in the Woods	Drew Goddard	Kristen Connolly, Chris Hemsworth, Anna Hutchison	United States	
Chernobyl Diaries	Brad Parker	Jesse McCartney, Jonathan Sadowski, Devin Kelley	United States	
Citadel	Ciaran Foy	Aneurin Barnard, Amy Shiels, Wunmi Mosaku	United Kingdom	
Cockneys vs Zombies	Matthias Hoene		United Kingdom	Horror comedy
The Cohasset Snuff Film	Edward Payson	Stephen Wu	United States	
The Collection	Marcus Dunstan	Emma Fitzpatrick, Josh Stewart, Christopher McDonald	United States	
Cross Bearer	Adam Ahlbrant	J.D. Brown, Isaac Williams, Natalie Jean	United States	
Dark Flight	Issara Nadee	Marsha Vadhanapanich, Peter Knight, Patcharee Tubthong	Thailand	
Dark Shadows	Tim Burton	Johnny Depp, Michelle Pfeiffer, Helena Bonham Carter	United States	
Dark Tide	John Stockwell	Halle Berry, Olivier Martinez	United States	
Dead Before Dawn	April Mullen	Devon Bostick, Martha MacIsaac, Christopher Lloyd	Canada	Horror comedy
Dead Sushi	Noboru Iguchi	Rina Takeda, Shigeru Matsuzaki, Kentaro Shimazu	Japan	
The Death is Here	David Kuan	He Dujuan, Zak Di, Wang Yi	China	
Decay	Luke Thompson	Zoë Hatherell, Tom Procter, Stewart Martin-Haugh, Sara Mahmoud, William P.Martin	United Kingdom	
The Devil Inside	William Brent Bell	Fernanda Andrade, Simon Quarterman, Evan Helmuth	United States	
Dracula 3D	Dario Argento	Thomas Kretschmann, Asia Argento, Marta Gastini	Italy; Spain; France	
Elfie Hopkins	Ryan Andrews	Jaime Winstone, Aneurin Barnard, Rupert Evans	United Kingdom	Horror comedy
Evil Head	Doug Sakmann		United States	
Excision	Richard Bates, Jr.	Annalynne McCord, Traci Lords, Ariel Winter	United States	
Foreclosure	Richard Ledes	Bill Raymond, Michael Imperioli, Spencer List	United States	
Found	Scott Schirmer	Louie Lawless, Phyllis Munro, Ethan Philbeck	United States	
Frankenweenie	Tim Burton	Catherine O'Hara, Martin Short, Martin Landau	United States	Animated film
Gallowwalkers	Andrew Goth	Wesley Snipes, Kevin Howarth, Riley Smith	United States	
Ghost Day	Thanit Jitnukul, Titipong Chaisati, Sorathep Vetwongsatip	Apisit Opasaimlikit, Pimradapa Wright, Padong Songsang	Thailand	
The Ghost Tales	Tso Shih-chiang	River Huang, Lorene Ren, Lee Yi-chieh, Wu Pong-fong, Tsai Chen-nan, James Wen	Taiwan	Fantasy horror
Grabbers	Jon Wright	Richard Coyle, Ruth Bradley, Russell Tovey	United Kingdom	
Grave Encounters 2	John Poliquin	Richard Harmon, Leanne Lapp, Dylan Playfair	United States	
Harpoon	Zhou Yaowu	Monika Mok, Hu Bing, Wang Shuangbao	China	
Haunted Poland	Pau Masó	Ewelina Lukaszewska, Pau Masó, Irene Gonzalez	Spain; Poland	
Hellbenders	J. T. Petty	Clancy Brown, Clifton Collins Jr., Andre Royo	United States	Horror comedy
Horror Stories	Im Dae-woong, Jeong Beom-Sik, Hong Ji-young, Kim Sun, Kim Gok		South Korea	
John Dies at the End	Don Coscarelli	Chase Williamson, Rob Mayes, Paul Giamatti	United States	Horror comedy
Killer Kart	James Feeney	Ray Bouchard, Christine Alicia Rodriguez, Elly Schaefer	United States	
The Lords of Salem	Rob Zombie	Sheri Moon Zombie, Ernest Thomas, Jeff Daniel Phillips	United States	
Lovely Molly	Eduardo Sanchez	Alexandra Holden, Johnny Lewis	United States	
Maniac	Franck Khalfoun	Elijah Wood, Megan Duffy, Nora Arnezeder	France; United States	
Modus Anomali	Joko Anwar	Rio Dewanto, Hannah Al Rashid, Izzi Isman	Indonesia	
Nightmare	Herman Yau	Fiona Sit, Huang Xuan, Zhou Chuchu	China	
No One Lives	Ryuhei Kitamura	Luke Evans, Adelaide Clemens, Lee Tergesen	United States	
The Pact	Nicholas McCarthy	Caity Lotz, Kathleen Rose Perkins, Haley Hudson	United States	
Painless	Juan Carlos Medina	Tomas Lemarquis, Juan Diego, Alex Brendemühl	France; Portugal; Spain	
Paranormal Activity 4	Henry Josst, Ariel Schulman	Kathryn Newton	United States	
ParaNorman	Sam Fell, Chris Butler	Kodi Smit-McPhee, Tucker Albrizzi, Anna Kendrick	United States	Animated film
Piranha 3DD	John Gulager	Danielle Panabaker, Matthew Bush, Chris Zylka	United States	
The Possession	Ole Bornedal	Jeffrey Dean Morgan, Kyra Sedgwick, Natasha Calis	United States	
Prometheus	Ridley Scott	Noomi Rapace, Michael Fassbender, Charlize Theron	United States	Science fiction horror
Raaz 3	Vikram Bhatt	Bipasha basu, Imran Hashmi, Esha Gupta	India	
Rape Zombie: Lust of the Dead	Naoyuki Tomomatsu	Arisu Ozawa, Asami, Yui Aikawa	Japan	
REC 3: Genesis	Paco Plaza	Diego Martín, Leticia Dolera, Javier Botet	Spain	
Resolution	Justin Benson, Aaron Scott Moorhead	Peter Cilella, Vinny Curran, Zahn McClarnon	United States	
Sadako 3D	Tsutomu Hanabusa		Japan	
Scary or Die	Bob Badway	Domiziano Arcangeli, Corbin Bleu, Bill Oberst Jr.	United States	
Shackled	Upi Avianto	Abimana Aryasatya, Imelda Therinne, Laudya Chintya Bella	Indonesia	
Silent Hill: Revelation 3D	Michael J. Bassett	Adelaide Clemens, Sean Bean, Radha Mitchell	Canada; France	
Silent House	Chris Kentis, Laura Lau	Elizabeth Olsen	United States	
Silent Night	Steven C. Miller	Malcolm McDowell, Jaime King, Donal Logue, Ellen Wong, Brendan Fehr	United States	Slasher
The Sleeping Soul	Shawn Burkett	Ayse Howard, Corey A. Thrush	United States	Supranatural
Sinister	Scott Derrickson	Ethan Hawke, Vincent D'Onofrio, James Ransone	United States	
Smiley	Michael J. Gallagher	Caitlin Gerard, Melanie Papalia, Shane Dawson	United States	
Stitches	Conor McMahon	Ross Noble, Tommy Knight	Ireland	
Storage 24	Johannes Roberts	Noel Clarke, Colin O'Donoghue, Antonia Campbell-Hughes	United Kingdom	
Terror Hotel	Laizhi Zheng		China	
ThanksKilling 3	Jordan Downey	Dan Usaj, Joe Hartzler, Marc M.	United States	
Tiktik: The Aswang Chronicles	Erik Matti	Dingdong Dantes, Joey Marquez, Lovi Poe	Philippines	
Truth or Dare	Robert Heath	David Oakes, Liam Boyle, Jack Gordon	United Kingdom	
Underworld: Awakening	Mans Marlind, Bjorn Stein	Kate Beckinsale, Stephen Rea, Michael Ealy	United States	
V/H/S	Adam Wingard, David Bruckner, Ti West, Glenn McQuaid, Joe Swanberg	Joe Swanberg, Adam Wingard, Sophia Takal	United States	
The Wailer III	Javier Barbera	Josh DeLozier, Maria Pallas, Chris Anderson, Nicole Simpson, Kristina Korsholm, Rhoda Pell	United States	Direct-to-video
The Woman in Black	James Watkins	Daniel Radcliffe, Ciarán Hinds, Janet McTeer	Canada; United Kingdom	
When the Lights Went Out	Pat Holden	Steve Waddington, Kate Ashfield, Tasha Connor, Craig Parkinson, Gary Lewis, Martin Compston, Hannah Clifford	United Kingdom	
Where the Dead Go to Die	Jimmy ScreamerClauz	Ruby Larocca, Brandon Slage, Joey Smack	United States	Animated film
Would You Rather	David Guy Levy	Jeffrey Combs, Brittany Snow, Sasha Grey	United States	
Wrong Turn 5: Bloodlines	Declan O'Brien	Doug Bradley, Camilla Arfwedson, Simon Ginty, Roxanne McKee, Paul Luebke, Oliver Hoare, Kyle Redmond Jones	United States	Slasher
