= Brent Everett =

Canadian gay pornographic actor (born 1984)

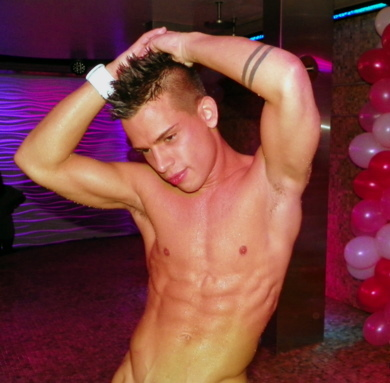
- Everett in 2011
- Born: Dustin Germaine; February 10, 1984 (age 42); Moose Jaw, Saskatchewan, Canada
- Other name: Brent Young
- Years active: 2003–present
- Height: 5 ft 7 in (170 cm)
- Spouse: Steve Peña (m. 2008; div. 2017)

Brent Everett (born Dustin Germaine; February 10, 1984) is a Canadian gay pornographic film actor and director.

== Career ==
Everett has been a gay pornography performer since 2003, debuting together with his first boyfriend, fellow porn star Chase McKenzie. In 2003, he had also featured in a bareback (anal sex without a condom) themed pornographic film, Barebacking Across America. He rose to prominence in 2004, when he starred with Brent Corrigan in Cobra Video’s controversial Schoolboy Crush; which, as it was later found out, was filmed when Corrigan was underage.

He was the centerfold model in the September 2003 issue of Freshmen, and has also modelled for Playguy on several occasions. He set up his own distribution company Triple X Studios in 2004, and made his directorial debut with Wantin' More (2006).

In 2009, Metro Weekly described him as "one of the industry's most popular performers". J. C. Adams included him in his list of 100 most famous porn stars, in his book Gay Porn Heroes (2011), in The Boys Next Door category.

In 2012, Everett co-starred with Michael Serrato in Killian Wells's music video "STRFKR". It was released through Wells' Inferno Records. Everett said he chose to be in the music video as he liked Wells' work.

Everett was named the Best International Pornstar at the Prowler Porn Awards in 2014. He is also a two-time Grabby winner—winning Performer of the Year in 2011.

== Personal life ==
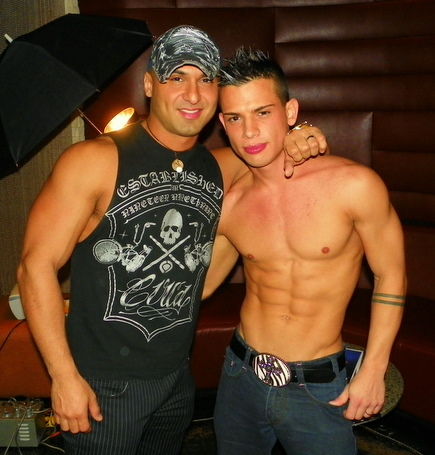
Everett (right) with his then-husband Steve Peña in 2011, at the Meteor gay bar in Houston, Texas

In September 2008, Everett announced his marriage to fellow pornographic actor Steve Peña. They were wed in a private ceremony on October 3, 2008 in San Diego, California.

In 2009, Everett told Metro Weekly that his mother and father were supportive of his career, describing them as "the first two parents to show up ever at a GayVN Awards ceremony".

Steve and Brent had been in a throuple with Jayson Smith, a popular bartender at Washington D.C.’s JR’s Bar & Grill, and their relationship inspired a romance novel Drunk in Love by Olivia Black. Smith announced his split in March 2016, accusing Peña and Everett of drug use.

In August 2016, Everett spoke out about his issues with drug addiction. And in November 2017, Peña announced that he and Everett were separating.

== See also ==
- List of actors in gay pornographic films
