= Ewelina Lukaszewska =

Polish film director, model and actress (born 1987)

- Born: Ewelina Malgorzata Lukaszewska; 1987 (age 38–39); Włocławek, Poland
- Occupations: actor, director, model
- Years active: 2010-present
- Website: Official Facebook page

Ewelina Lukaszewska (born Ewelina Malgorzata Lukaszewska in 1987) is a Polish film director, model and actress, who appeared in the films Haunted Poland, Aleksandr's Price and Who's There?.

== Film career ==
Lukaszewska has acted on a couple successful independent films, including, Who's There? and Haunted Poland which is due for release in 2012. Who's There? has received good critics. Lukaszewska is in pre-production for The App Killer.

On the summer of 2011, Lukaszewska gained more recognition as an actress for her performance in Haunted Poland.

Lukaszewska is currently rumored to portray Vikki in the film Machete Kills directed by Robert Rodriguez and Veronika in The App Killer directed by Pau Masó.

== Filmography ==
=== Films ===
- 2011 Who's There?
- 2012 Haunted Poland
- 2012 Simple Moves
- 2012 The App Killer
- 2013 Machete Kills

== Awards and nominations ==
In October 2011, Haunted Poland won "Best Movie/Documentary/Video/Script featuring Religiosus/Supernatural theme" on the American International Film Festival (AIFF2010.com).
