= Schoolboy Crush =

Schoolboy Crush or School Boy Crush may refer to:

== Films ==
- Schoolboy Crush (film), a 2004 gay pornographic film starring Brent Everett and featuring Brent Corrigan in his major debut role
- Schoolboy Crush, an alternate title of the 2006 Japanese film Boys Love: The Movie, starring Yoshikazu Kotani

== Music ==
- "School Boy Crush", song from Average White Band's 1975 album Cut The Cake
- "Schoolboy Crush", a song originally sung by American singer Bobby Helms, also recorded by Cliff Richard as B-side to his major single hit "Move It"
