= Simple Moves =

Simple Moves may refer to:

- "Simple Moves", a single also known as "Prostye Dvizhenia" from the t.A.T.u. album T.A.T.u. Remixes
- Aleksandr's Price, an upcoming American film which was announced under the working title Simple Moves
