= Larksville, Pennsylvania =

Borough in Pennsylvania, US

- Borough
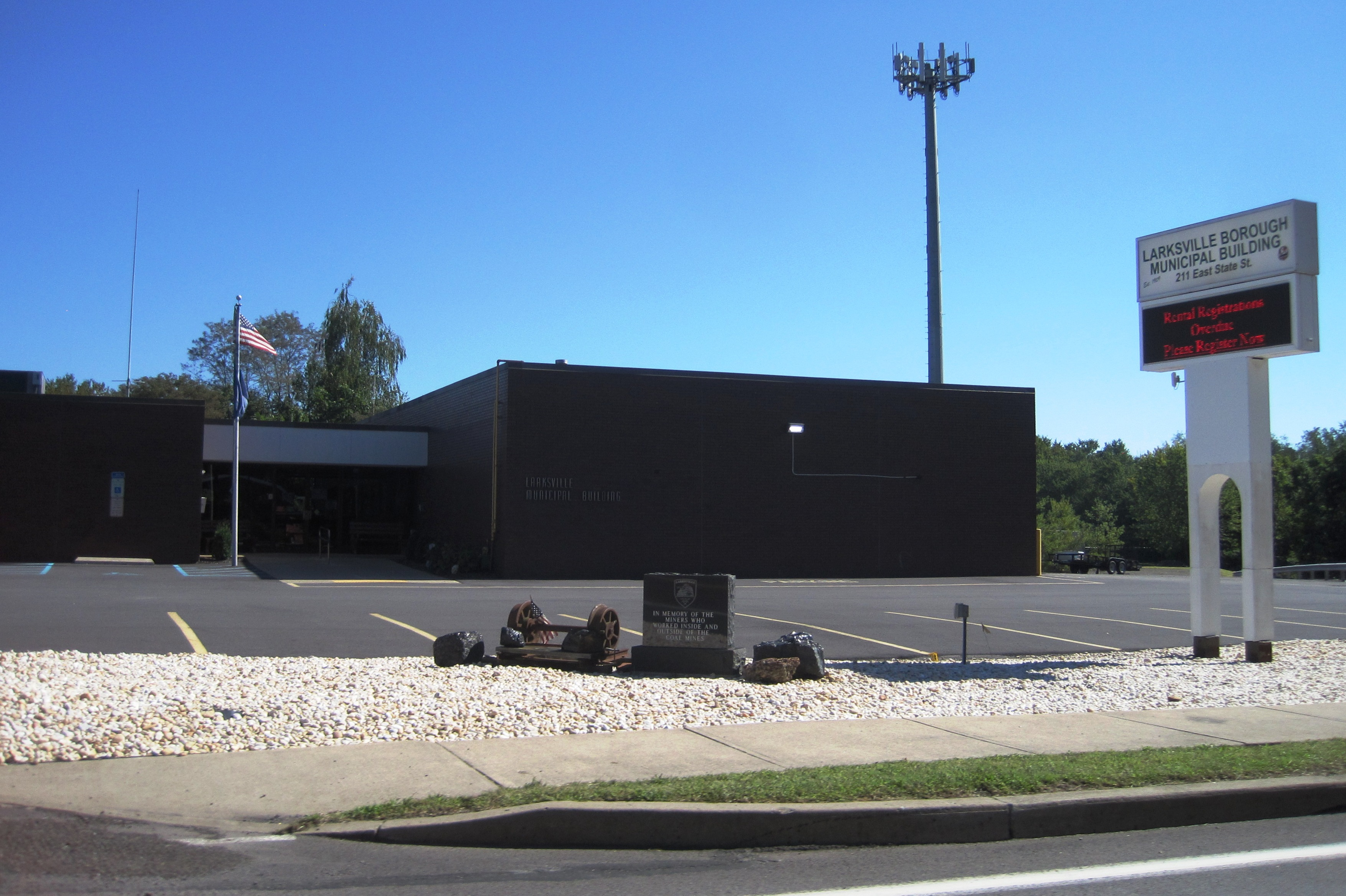
- Larksville Borough Municipal Building

- Coat of arms

- Location of Larksville in Luzerne County, Pennsylvania.

- Location within Pennsylvania Location within the United States
- Coordinates: 41°15′31″N 75°55′38″W
- Country: United States
- State: Pennsylvania
- County: Luzerne
- Incorporated: 1909

Government
  - Type: Borough Council

Area
  - Total: 4.84 sq mi (12.54 km^{2})
  - Land: 4.69 sq mi (12.15 km^{2})
  - Water: 0.15 sq mi (0.39 km^{2})

Population (2020)
  - Total: 4,225
  - Density: 900.8/sq mi (347.79/km^{2})
- Time zone: UTC-5 (Eastern (EST))
  - Summer (DST): UTC-4 (EDT)
- Area code: 570
- FIPS code: 42-41608
- Website: larksvilleborough.org

Larksville is a borough in Luzerne County, Pennsylvania, United States. It is 2 miles (3 km) west of Wilkes Barre on the Susquehanna River (along U.S. Route 11). The population was 4,216 as of the 2020 census.

== History ==
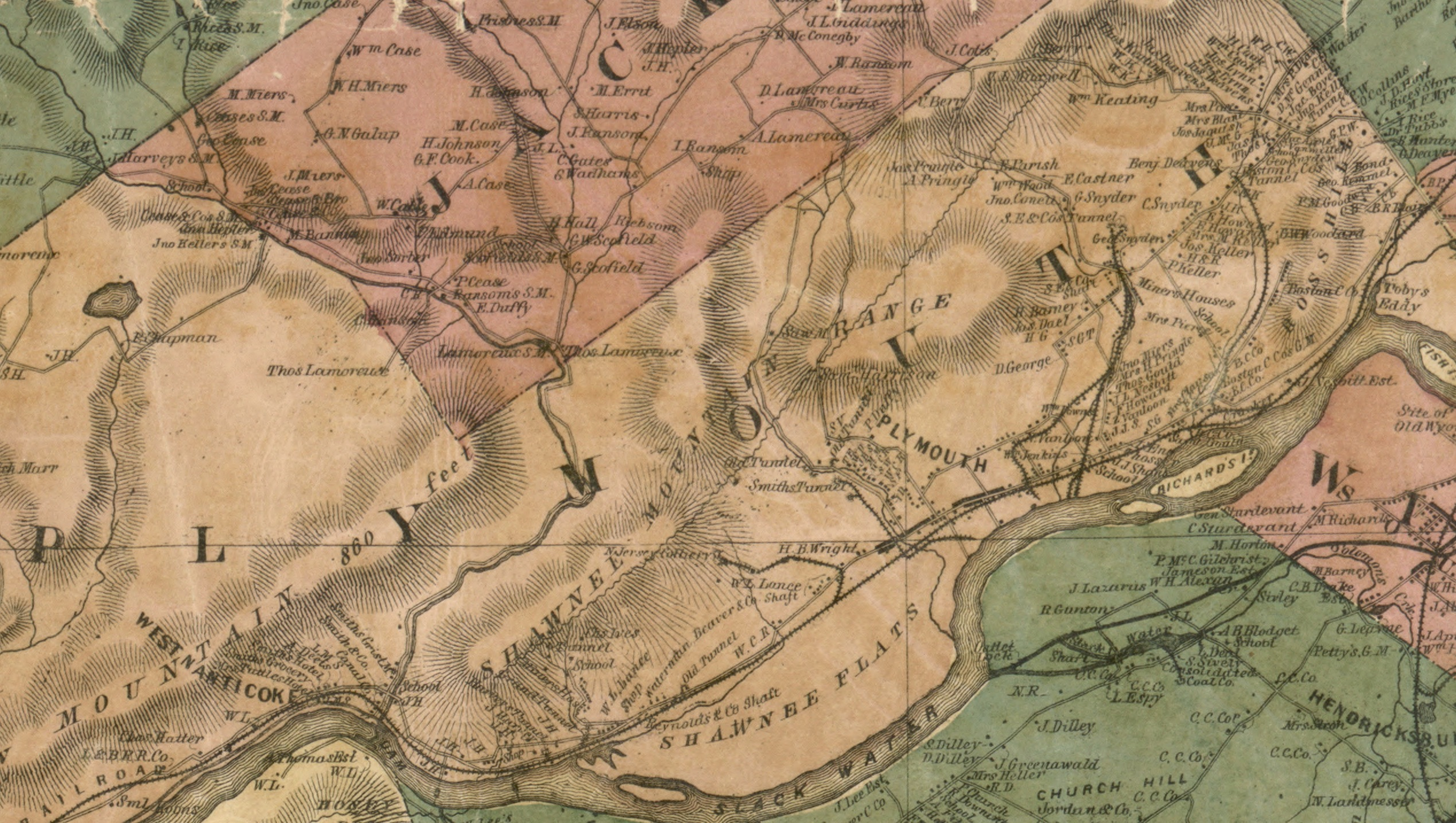
A map of Plymouth Township in 1864. The eastern part of the township became Larksville.

Larksville was formed from a section of Plymouth Township; it was incorporated as a borough on November 10, 1909. Once known as Blindtown, the community's name was changed to Larksville in honor of Peggy Lark, a former resident.

The borough gained prominence in the late 19th and early 20th centuries as an active anthracite coal mining community, drawing a large portion of its labor force from European immigrants. Larksville was a thriving mining town. Houses were clustered around the collieries. The collieries in the borough were Boston, Loree, Lance, Woodward, and Number 4. At its peak, in 1920, Larksville's population was well over 9,000 people. However, the mining industry in the region collapsed after the 1959 Knox Mine Disaster. The population began to dwindle after its demise. Today, the population is just over 4,000.

== Geography ==
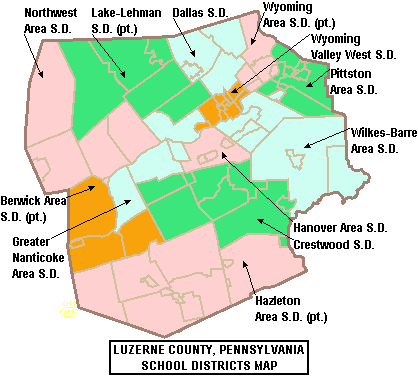
A map of Luzerne County school districts. Wyoming Valley West can be seen in orange (near central Luzerne County).

Larksville is located at 41°15′31″N 75°55′38″W (41.258525, -75.927176).

According to the United States Census Bureau, the borough has a total area of 4.9 square miles (12.6 km^{2}), of which 4.7 square miles (12.2 km^{2}) is land and 0.15 square miles (0.4 km^{2}), or 3.24%, is water. The Susquehanna River makes up Larksville's southeastern border. U.S. Route 11 travels through the southern portion of the borough. Most of the homes and businesses are located in central and southern Larksville. The northern portion of the borough mostly consists of hills, forests, and a few houses. Larksville is part of the Wyoming Valley West School District.

== Demographics ==
Historical population
Census	Pop.	Note	%±
1880	454		—
1910	9,288		—
1920	9,438		1.6%
1930	9,322		−1.2%
1940	8,467		−9.2%
1950	6,360		−24.9%
1960	4,390		−31.0%
1970	3,937		−10.3%
1980	4,410		12.0%
1990	4,700		6.6%
2000	4,694		−0.1%
2010	4,480		−4.6%
2020	4,225		−5.7%
2021 (est.)	4,225	Steady	0.0%

=== 2020 census ===
As of the 2020 census, Larksville had a population of 4,225. The median age was 47.8 years. 17.0% of residents were under the age of 18 and 22.7% of residents were 65 years of age or older. For every 100 females there were 96.7 males, and for every 100 females age 18 and over there were 94.0 males age 18 and over.

89.4% of residents lived in urban areas, while 10.6% lived in rural areas.

There were 1,794 households in Larksville, of which 22.8% had children under the age of 18 living in them. Of all households, 44.9% were married-couple households, 18.3% were households with a male householder and no spouse or partner present, and 27.6% were households with a female householder and no spouse or partner present. About 27.3% of all households were made up of individuals and 13.7% had someone living alone who was 65 years of age or older.

There were 1,988 housing units, of which 9.8% were vacant. The homeowner vacancy rate was 1.7% and the rental vacancy rate was 5.8%.

Racial composition as of the 2020 census
Race	Number	Percent
White	3,825	90.5%
Black or African American	128	3.0%
American Indian and Alaska Native	5	0.1%
Asian	30	0.7%
Native Hawaiian and Other Pacific Islander	0	0.0%
Some other race	44	1.0%
Two or more races	193	4.6%
Hispanic or Latino (of any race)	142	3.4%

=== 2000 census ===
As of the census of 2000, there were 4,694 people, 1,808 households, and 1,323 families residing in the borough. The population density was 986.0 inhabitants per square mile (380.7/km^{2}). There were 1,939 housing units at an average density of 407.3 per square mile (157.3/km^{2}). The racial makeup of the borough was 98.93% White, 0.28% African American, 0.04% Native American, 0.28% Asian, 0.13% from other races, and 0.34% from two or more races. Hispanic or Latino of any race were 0.70% of the population.

There were 1,808 households, out of which 32.1% had children under the age of 18 living with them, 56.3% were married couples living together, 12.6% had a female householder with no husband present, and 26.8% were non-families. 22.6% of all households were made up of individuals, and 11.7% had someone living alone who was 65 years of age or older. The average household size was 2.59 and the average family size was 3.05.

In the borough the population was spread out, with 23.4% under the age of 18, 7.2% from 18 to 24, 27.2% from 25 to 44, 26.7% from 45 to 64, and 15.5% who were 65 years of age or older. The median age was 40 years. For every 100 females, there were 94.4 males. For every 100 females age 18 and over, there were 91.9 males.

The median income for a household in the borough was $35,467, and the median income for a family was $41,211. Males had a median income of $33,993 versus $21,998 for females. The per capita income for the borough was $16,196. About 10.2% of families and 13.6% of the population were below the poverty line, including 19.1% of those under age 18 and 9.5% of those age 65 or over.

== Education ==
It is in the Wyoming Valley West School District.

== Notable people ==
- April Fronzoni, a field hockey striker from the United States
- Bryan Kocis, founder of Cobra Video
- Frank O'Connell, Pennsylvania State Representative and State Senator
- John Siegal, an American football player
- Joe Skladany, an American football player
- Leo Skladany, an American football player

== See also ==
- Coal mining in Plymouth, Pennsylvania.
