= Triple Crossed (2013 film) =

- Official movie poster
- Directed by: Sean Paul Lockhart
- Written by: Linda Andersson
- Produced by: Ashley Ahn; Ward Bodner; Joshua Dinner; Steven Vasquez
- Starring: Jack Brockett; Laura Reilly; Sean Paul Lockhart; Addison Graham
- Cinematography: Steven Vasquez
- Edited by: Steven Vasquez
- Music by: Chad Siwik
- Production companies: Babaloo Studios; Lime Street Entertainment
- Distributed by: TLA Releasing
- Release date: November 12, 2013
- Running time: 99 minutes
- Country: United States
- Language: English
- Budget: $41,000 (estimated)

Triple Crossed is a 2013 mystery-thriller film directed by Sean Paul Lockhart, written by Linda Andersson, and starring Jack Brockett, Addison Graham, Sean Paul Lockhart, and Laura Reilly. The film is the story of a gritty and seductive take on one man's torment, the collateral damage of war and finding life after loss.

== Plot ==
A man by the name of Chris Jensen (Jack Brockett) is out to kill a person he swore on his best friend's death bed to protect. Chris is torn between his allegiance to his fallen friend, Tyler Townsend (Addison Graham), who died in Afghanistan, and Tyler's half-sister, who hires Chris to kill her late brother's gay lover. The lover, Andrew Warner (Sean Paul Lockhart), stands to inherit half of the family's multi-million dollar company left to him by Tyler. Tyler's half-sister Jackie Townsend (Laura Reilly) has other plans for the young and unassuming Andrew. All goes to plan even though Chris has fallen in love with the young Andrew. Andrew grows suspicious, the plan is revealed and it's every man and woman for themselves. A fortune will go to the last one standing.

== Cast ==
Named characters

- Jack Brockett as Chris (aka.Jackson Tiller)
- Matthew Campbell as Tanner
- Addison Graham as Tyler
- Tellier Killaby as Kendra
- Sean Paul Lockhart as Andrew
- Ryan Massey as Derek
- Laura Reilly as Jackie Townsend
- Chad Siwik as Himself

Unnamed characters

- Ashley Ahn as Bartender
- Ward Bodner as Man Hitting Car Window
- Joshua Dinner as Bar Patron
- Jude B. Lanston as MP Officer
- Steven Tylor O'Connor as Drug Dealer
- Tammy Tolene as Girlfriend in car
- Cory Tyndall as Bar Patron
- Steven Vasquez as Bar Patron
- Jill Zimmer as Waitress

== Reception ==
Michael D. Klemm of CinemaQueer said, "Triple Crossed is a low budget, yet somewhat nifty, sexual thriller. Its concept is good, and it’s a lot of fun as long as you don’t take it too seriously". David Hall of Gay Celluloid gave three stars and said, "Filled with some passionate scenes of man-on-man lip-service and more, backed by the vibrant music of Chad Siwik and filmed, in part, in the lush location of Topanga Canyon, California, this feature frankly ticks many of the requisite boxes on the "festival favourites" checklist". Tim Isaac of Big Gay Picture Show commented: "Triple Crossed may have its flaws, but it’s an entertaining thriller with a cute gay romance at its core." Amos Lassen of ReviewsbyAmosLassen wrote "Quite naturally there is a lot of tension but even more important is that the film presents the viewer with gay characters who fight for what they believe in".
