= Bryan Kocis =

American pornographic director (1962–2007)

- Born: Bryan Charles Kocis; May 28, 1962; Larksville, Pennsylvania, U.S.
- Died: January 24, 2007 (aged 44); Dallas Township, Pennsylvania, U.S.
- Cause of death: Stabbing
- Other name: Bryan Phillips
- Occupation: Pornographer
- Known for: Cobra Video founder Brent Corrigan controversy Publicized death

Bryan Charles Kocis (May 28, 1962 – January 24, 2007), also known as Bryan Phillips, was a director of gay pornographic films and founder of Cobra Video, a gay porn film studio. Kocis was murdered at his Dallas Township, Pennsylvania, home on January 24, 2007; arson was used in an attempt to disguise the circumstances of his death. Two escorts, Harlow Cuadra and Joseph Kerekes, were charged and convicted for Kocis' murder and subsequently given a sentence of life imprisonment without any possibility of parole.

== Early life ==
Bryan Charles Kocis was raised in Larksville, Pennsylvania, the first son of Michael and Joyce Kocis. He graduated from Rochester Institute of Technology, after which he worked as a medical photographer for a local eye doctor.

== Career ==
After he left the medical photography business, he tried several business ventures, all of which failed. In 2001, he was involved in a cellular phone venture. After being charged with sexual assault on a 15-year-old boy, he was removed as a partner in that venture, and established Cobra Video, also in 2001. Later that year, Kocis filed for bankruptcy in federal court. Kocis created two legal entities with the name "Cobra Video LLC": one in Pennsylvania in 2002, the other in Delaware in 2005.

Cobra competed in the market niche of low-budget, Barely Legal-style bareback films. The company was dedicated to "Capturing the Erotic Essence of Youth" by producing pornographic movies of young men who looked as if they could be adolescents having sex without condoms.

In the five years after, between his bankruptcy and his death, Kocis' Cobra Video did very well financially. At the time of his death, Kocis had amassed personal possessions which included a Maserati convertible, a BMW sport utility vehicle and an Aston Martin car. In addition to his Dallas Township home, Kocis owned two adjacent Rice Township parcels of land, valued at over $400,000, with no mortgages.

== Controversies ==
=== Allegations of sexual abuse of a child ===
In 2002, police found a videotape of Bryan Kocis, then 39, and a 15-year-old male in his home. Kocis pleaded guilty to one count of sexual abuse of a child. He was charged with child pornography, and transportation of a minor for sexual purposes. Since the boy had lied about his age Kocis was given a probation sentence.

In 2006 a judge, Michael Conahan, signed paperwork changing Kocis' charge from sex assault to corruption of minors. Kocis' former attorney, Al Flora, said the change was made because the original charge of sexual assault of a child was a mistake and that, "We didn't realize there was an error until 2006." As a result of that change, Kocis was not required to be registered as a Megan's Law offender. Conahan later pleaded guilty to federal racketeering charges in relation to the "Kids for Cash" scandal, and was sentenced to 17.5 years in prison.

=== Brent Corrigan ===
Beginning in early 2004, Kocis cast Sean Lockhart, in Cobra's Every Poolboy's Dream under the stage name "Brent Corrigan". He starred in several more films in that year, notably Schoolboy Crush in 2004, in Bareboned Twinks and Casting Couch 4 in 2005, and other releases in 2006. On September 13, 2005, Corrigan's attorney announced that Corrigan was underaged when he filmed scenes for Cobra Video, and had used a fake ID to participate in those scenes. Cobra denied that it was ever aware of such allegations and publicly stated that it had copies of Corrigan's identity documents claiming a birth year of 1985. A civil lawsuit between the two parties began soon after.

Kocis denied the allegations and began a counter-suit for copyright infringement, for the unauthorized use of Cobra's “Brent Corrigan” name. A final hearing in the matter was scheduled for February 21, 2007.

In 2005 and 2006, Cobra removed six of the titles which featured Lockhart from store shelves, although they cited no reason for the removal.

== Death ==
Kocis was found dead on January 24, 2007, at the age of 44, after a fire at his Dallas Township, Pennsylvania, home. According to the investigating coroner, Kocis was stabbed 28 times and his throat was cut, nearly decapitating him. His body was left in the house before it was set on fire. Officials had to use dental records to identify Kocis because his body was burned beyond recognition.

On May 15, 2007, two Virginia Beach escorts, Harlow Cuadra and Joseph Kerekes, were arrested and charged with Kocis' murder. Police arrested the pair after discovering evidence on Kocis' computer, which had survived the fire.

On December 8, 2008, Kerekes pleaded guilty to second-degree murder, theft, tampering with or fabricating evidence, and criminal conspiracy, and was sentenced to life in prison without parole. Cuadra pleaded not guilty and went to trial on February 24, 2009. He was found guilty of all charges. On March 16, he was sentenced to life in prison without parole. On April 7, 2009, Cuadra appealed his life sentence.

== Popular culture ==
Bryan Kocis' lawsuit against Sean Lockhart and the claim by Luzerne County (Pennsylvania) prosecutors during Harlow Cuadra's murder trial that Lockhart was "contractually bound" to perform sex acts for money for Bryan Kocis' Cobra Video company led to on-going public discussion about the legality of adult industry contracts and revealed why the adult entertainment industry in North America is concentrated in the State of California.

Cobra Killer: Gay Porn Murder, written by authors Andrew E. Stoner and Peter A. Conway, was about Bryan Kocis' murder, and the trials of Harlow Cuadra and Joseph Kerekes. Cobra Killer was published by Magnus Books on June 19, 2012.

Based on the book, the film King Cobra premiered at the 2016 Tribeca Film Festival, with Christian Slater playing Bryan Kocis.

== Partial videography ==
- Every Poolboy's Dream, 2004 (Cobra Video)
- Schoolboy Crush, 2004 (Cobra Video)
- Bareboned Twinks, 2005 (Cobra Video)
- Casting Couch 4, 2005 (Cobra Video)

The previous four titles were voluntarily removed from circulation due to Corrigan's underage dispute. They have remained for sale on internet auction sites.

- Cream BBoys, 2006 (Cobra Video)
- Naughty Boy's Toys, 2006 (Cobra Video)
- Brent Corrigan: Fuck Me Raw, 2006 (Cobra Video)
- Take It Like a Bitch Boy, 2006 (Cobra Video)
