= Daniel Kluger (composer) =

American composer, orchestrator, music producer and sound designer

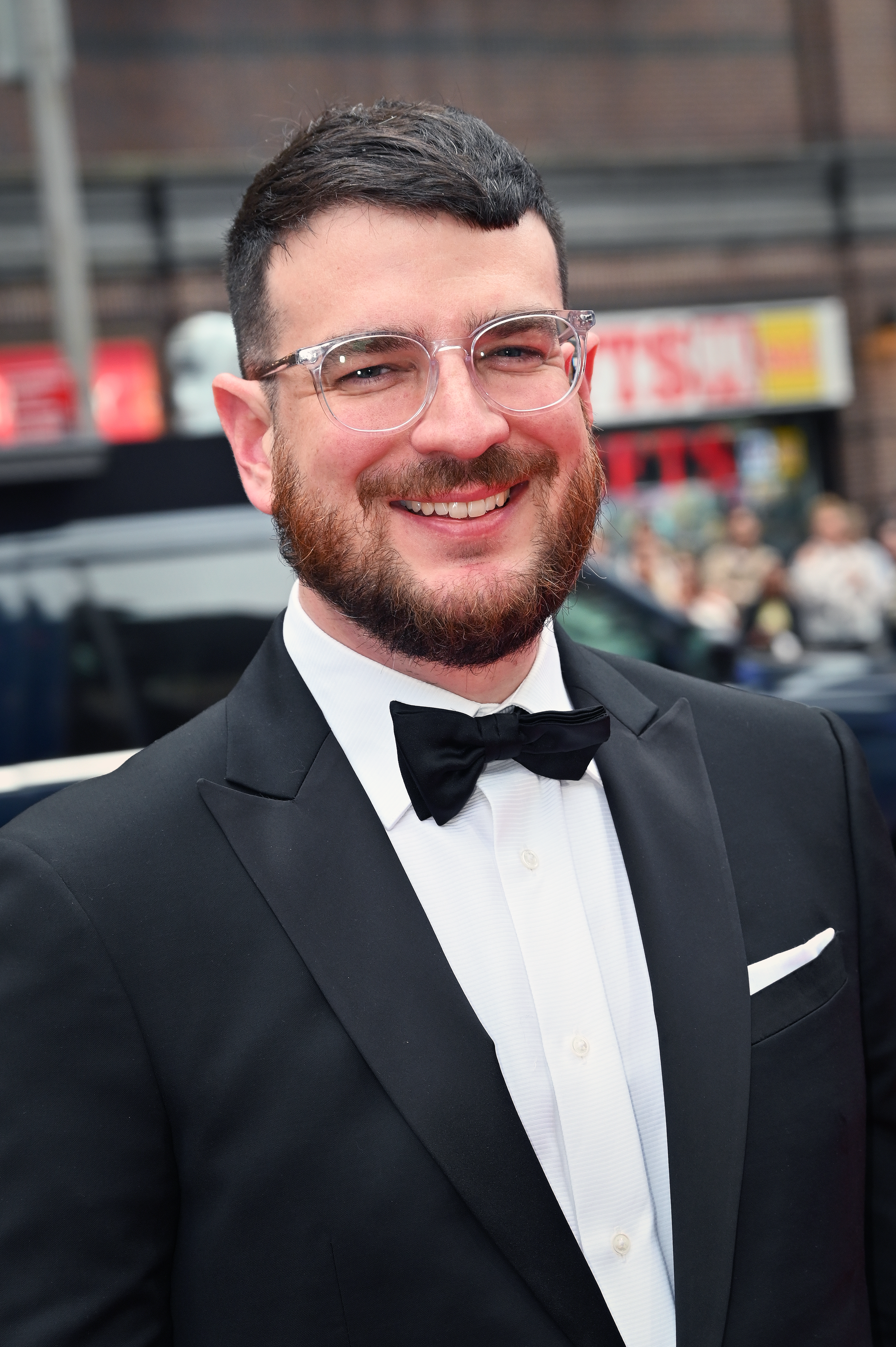
- Kluger in 2025
- Born: U.S.
- Occupations: Composer, orchestrator, Sound designer, music producer
- Years active: 2010 - present

Daniel Kluger is an American composer, orchestrator, music producer and sound designer. He is best known for his orchestration of the Broadway revival of Oklahoma!, which was nominated for four Tony Awards and one Grammy Award.

== Career ==
Kluger has been a lecturer in Sound Design at Yale University. In 2021, he founded the record label Archie & Fox Records, along with Ken Urban. He has collaborated with artists such as Sam Sadigursky, Bryan Carter and Riley Mulherkar. He is resident composer and producer at Renaissance Recordings.

Kluger's major Broadway credits include Oklahoma!, The Sound Inside, Marvin's Room, Significant Other and Sea Wall / A Life. He is founder of the music label, Archie & Fox Records.

== Filmography ==
=== As composer ===
- 2022 – The Courtroom
- 2022 – The Miranda Obsession
- 2022 – This is Harriet
- 2021 – The Guilty
- 2019 – The Bishop
- 2018 – Health to the King
- 2018 – Doulo
- 2015 – Buzzer
- 2010 – Where Hope Works

== Awards and nominations ==
Year	Award	Category	Work	Result	Ref.
2019	Tony Award	Best Orchestrations	Oklahoma!	Nominated	
2019	Obie Award	Special Citations	Oklahoma!	Won	
2019	Outer Critics Circle Award	Outstanding Orchestrations	Oklahoma!	Won	
2019	Drama Desk Award	Outstanding Orchestrations	Oklahoma!	Won	
2020	Grammy Awards	Best Musical Theater Album	Oklahoma!	Nominated	
2020	Tony Awards	Best Original Score	The Sound Inside	Nominated	
2020	Tony Awards	Best Sound Design	The Sound Inside	Nominated	
2020	Tony Awards	Best Sound Design	Sea Wall/A Life	Nominated	
2023	WhatsOnStage Awards	Best Musical Direction/Supervision	Oklahoma!	Nominated	
2023	Laurence Olivier Awards	Best Original Score or New Orchestrations	Oklahoma!	Nominated	
2026	Drama Desk Award	Outstanding Orchestrations	The Seat of Our Pants	Pending	
