= Bradley J. Fischer =

American film producer

- Born: September 8, 1976 (age 49); New York City, New York, U.S.
- Education: Columbia University
- Occupation: Film producer

Bradley J. Fischer (born September 8, 1976) is an American film producer and co-president of Phoenix Pictures.

== Early life and education ==
Fischer was born and raised in New York City, where he graduated from Columbia University with a B.A. in film studies in 1998.

== Career ==
After graduating, Fischer began working for Phoenix Pictures, eventually becoming the co-president of production in 2007. He has produced over seven films with the company, including Zodiac (2007) and Shutter Island (2010), and executive-produced Black Swan (2010). In 2011, Fischer formed his own production company, Mythology Entertainment.

In 2013, he co-produced the action-thriller White House Down. In 2018, Fischer co-produced two films: the horror film Suspiria, and the fantasy-horror film The House with a Clock in Its Walls.

== Filmography ==
Executive producer

- Basic (2003)
- Pathfinder (2007)
- Resurrecting the Champ (2007)
- License to Wed (2007)
- Black Swan (2010)
- Altered Carbon (2018) (6 episodes)
- Coming 2 America (2021)
- Without Remorse (2021)
- Infinite (2021)
- The Tomorrow War (2021)
- Clifford the Big Red Dog (2021)
- Transformers: Rise of the Beasts (2023)
- Mission: Impossible – Dead Reckoning Part One (2023)
- The Tiger's Apprentice (2024)
- Transformers One (2024)

Producer

- Zodiac (2007)
- Shutter Island (2010)
- White House Down (2013)
- Truth (2013)
- Slender Man (2018)
- The House with a Clock in Its Walls (2018)
- Suspiria (2018)
- Ready or Not (2019)
- Ambulance (2022)
- The Last Voyage of the Demeter (2023)
- Nuremberg (2025)
- Ready or Not 2: Here I Come (2026)
