= The Last Voyage of the Demeter =

2023 film by André Øvredal

- Theatrical release poster
- Directed by: André Øvredal
- Screenplay by: Bragi Schut Jr.; Zak Olkewicz
- Story by: Bragi Schut Jr.
- Based on: "The Log of the Demeter" from Dracula by Bram Stoker
- Produced by: Bradley J. Fischer; Mike Medavoy; Arnold W. Messer
- Starring: Corey Hawkins; Aisling Franciosi; David Dastmalchian; Liam Cunningham
- Cinematography: Tom Stern (Note: Roman Osin was the original cinematographer; however, Tom Stern was officially credited as cinematographer in the poster's billing block as well as the film's credit.)
- Edited by: Patrick Larsgaard
- Music by: Bear McCreary
- Production companies: DreamWorks Pictures; Reliance Entertainment; Storyworks Productions; Studio Babelsberg; Phoenix Pictures; Wise Owl Media
- Distributed by: Universal Pictures
- Release dates: August 10, 2023 (Italy); August 11, 2023 (United States)
- Running time: 119 minutes
- Countries: United States; Germany
- Language: English
- Budget: $45 million
- Box office: $21.8 million

The Last Voyage of the Demeter (also known as Dracula: Voyage of the Demeter in some international markets) is a 2023 supernatural horror film directed by André Øvredal, and written by Bragi F. Schut Jr. (Note: Schut was both credited as "Screenplay by" and "Story by".) and Zak Olkewicz. It is an adaptation of "The Captain's Log", a chapter from the 1897 novel Dracula by Bram Stoker. The film stars Corey Hawkins, Aisling Franciosi, Liam Cunningham, and David Dastmalchian. Its plot follows the doomed crew of the merchant ship Demeter who attempt to survive the treacherous ocean voyage from Transylvania to London while being stalked by a legendary vampire known as Dracula (Javier Botet).

Planning for the film adaptation of "The Captain's Log" began when Schut wrote the initial spec script when he befriended a colleague who worked on Bram Stoker's Dracula (1992), but did not come to fruition, languishing in development hell for more than two decades. After Amblin Partners obtained the rights in October 2019, it was announced that Øvredal would direct the film. The main cast members were confirmed in 2021. Principal photography began on June 30, 2021, in Berlin, continued in Malta, and ended on October 1. Some of the movie scenes were also recorded in the fortress city of Mdina. Thomas Newman was originally hired to compose the film's score, but was replaced by Bear McCreary due to Newman's scheduling conflicts.

The Last Voyage of the Demeter was theatrically released in the United States on August 11, 2023, by Universal Pictures. The film received mixed reviews from critics and was a box office bomb, grossing $22 million against a budget of $45 million.

== Plot ==
On 6 August 1897, the merchant ship Demeter washes ashore in England. Among its wreckage, the police find the log kept by her captain, Eliot.

One month earlier, Demeter has made port in Varna, Bulgaria, to receive cargo bound for London. A shipment of multiple large, wooden crates is delivered to the dock by local Romanian workers. However, upon delivery of the cargo, they declare that they must leave the area before sundown, and one of the men pays the quartermaster Wojchek and another crewman, Olgaren, a large sum of money. He wishes Demeter a safe voyage, before departing with the others.

Clemens, a doctor and graduate of the University of Cambridge, overhears that Demeter is looking for additional crewmen. He volunteers, arguing that his medical skills and knowledge of astronomy would make him a valuable asset, but Wojchek rejects him and hires an older man instead. While helping to load one of the crates, the man is startled upon recognizing a dragon emblem on the container, and accidentally releases the tackle rope, causing the crate to fall; Clemens witnesses the accident and saves Eliot's grandson, Toby, from being crushed by the loose crate. The newly hired man declares the dragon emblem a "bad omen" and leaves; out of gratitude for his intervention, Eliot hires Clemens as a replacement. Clemens meets the rest of the crew: Joseph, Petrofsky, Larsen, and Abrams.

After the ship leaves port, another crate falls and breaks open in the cargo hold. Clemens finds a woman inside, buried in soil, and performs blood transfusions to treat (what he believes to be) an infection. Later, in the Aegean Sea, Clemens and Olgaren see a mysterious figure shrouded in fog on the deck.

The following night, all the animals aboard the ship are found dead, including the ship's dog. The crew, fearing a rabies outbreak, throws the carcasses overboard. While on night watch, Petrofsky is attacked and killed by a humanoid creature. Anna, the woman in the crate, awakens the next day and warns the crew about a "monster" from Transylvania, a creature that feeds on the blood of humans. She explains that the people of her village call him Dracula, and that she was given to him as a "slave of blood" so that he would leave the village in peace. She warns Clemens that Dracula is aboard the ship and needs to feed, revealing several bite marks on her body.

Dracula kills Larsen and bites Olgaren, turning him into a vampiric thrall. Olgaren is temporarily restrained, but breaks free and begins hunting Toby, trapping him in the captain's quarters with Dracula. As the crew attempts to save him, Toby is bitten by Dracula. The next morning, the vampiric Olgaren, who had been tied to the mast by the crew, bursts into flames as the rising sun touches his body. In the evening, Joseph knocks Abrams out and escapes on a lifeboat, but Dracula chases and kills him. Despite blood transfusions from his grandfather, Toby dies the following day, and is wrapped in parts of the sailcloth for his burial-at-sea. During the funeral, the captain believes he sees Toby moving; he unwraps him, only for Toby to suddenly attack. The vampiric Toby then immolates in the sunlight (and severely burns his grandfather) before Clemens is able to throw him into the ocean.

The remaining crew want to destroy the ship and drown Dracula to prevent him from causing chaos once they reach London. Abrams, Wojchek, and Eliot are all killed by Dracula, and Anna is bitten again during an attempt to save Clemens. Clemens rescues Anna by hitting Dracula with an axe, and Anna manages to crush Dracula with a part of the mast. Anna and Clemens jump ship, thinking the vampire is dead, but the ship ends up running aground on the British coast, enabling Dracula to push the mast off of his body and escape.

As Anna and Clemens float on debris, she reveals to him that she is now becoming a vampire after Dracula's bite; the blood transfusions only delayed the process. As the day dawns, not wanting to become a monster, Anna willingly self-immolates in the sunrise, as Clemens drifts ashore.

Arriving in London, Clemens goes to a local tavern, where he draws Anna's portrait in his notebook. He hears the knocking signal from the Demeter's crew of "all clear", and then sees Dracula, dressed as an aristocrat, laughing at him; the vampire disappears. Leaving the pub, Clemens sees Dracula's shadow and follows him; he vows, for the memory and honour of his dead companions, that he will kill Dracula and send him back to Hell.

== Cast ==
- Corey Hawkins as Clemens, a doctor who joins the Demeter
- Aisling Franciosi as Anna, an unwitting stowaway and the slave of Dracula
- Liam Cunningham as Captain Eliot, the captain of the Demeter
- David Dastmalchian as Wojchek, the Demeter's quartermaster
- Javier Botet as Dracula, a legendary Mythical Transylvanian vampire, and lord of Anna.
- Woody Norman as Toby, Eliot's grandson
- Jon Jon Briones as Joseph, the deeply religious cook
- Stefan Kapičić as Olgaren
- Nikolai Nikolaeff as Petrofsky
- Martin Furulund as Larsen
- Chris Walley as Abrams

== Production ==
=== Development ===
While working at a model shop in Hollywood, Bragi Schut Jr. befriended a colleague who worked on Bram Stoker's Dracula (1992). Schut took interest in a miniature of the Demeter used for the film and began writing an Alien-inspired film set aboard the ship. Based on the chapter "The Captain's Log" from Bram Stoker's novel Dracula, Schut researched the time period to ensure authenticity. In 2003, Phoenix Pictures acquired the film and tapped Robert Schwentke to direct and rewrite the script with Mitch Brian. Progression on the film would stagger until December 2006 when James V. Hart, screenwriter of Bram Stoker's Dracula, turned in a new draft of the script. By May 2009, Schwentke moved on and Marcus Nispel would step in as his replacement. Production was slated to begin that year. However, due to complications adapting the period setting and filming on the water, Nispel too would depart. By March 2010, the studio moved onto Stefan Ruzowitzky to direct while Mike Medavoy, Arnold W. Messer, and Bradley J. Fischer were slated to produce. After generating Oscar buzz, Fischer sought out a meeting with Noomi Rapace in August 2010 to discuss the film. He performed his own revisions to the script and officially cast Rapace and Ben Kingsley in October of that year. Ruzowitzky would exit the film in favor of taking on Deadfall (2012).

David Slade became attached to the film in February 2011, but reports indicated that Rapace was likely to drop out of the film due to her impending commitments to Prometheus (2012). Rapace would verify these doubts the following month. Days later, Jude Law was reportedly in line to lead the film. The next month, Slade reassured that the film was still moving forward despite signing on to a Daredevil film. In May 2012, Neil Marshall and Millennium Films boarded the film to direct and produce. Novelist Lowell Cauffiel was brought along for further rewrites. By June, Viggo Mortensen began talks to portray the lead role. Kingsley was still said to be attached to the project while Rapace's involvement stayed in doubt. In December 2014, Marshall remained hopeful that the film would be made. Much like the filmmakers before him, Marshall would leave too.

In October 2019, it was announced André Øvredal would direct the film with Amblin Partners obtaining the rights. In January 2021, Corey Hawkins joined the cast of the film with a new draft written by Zak Olkewicz. In December 2022, Schut and Olkewicz received screenplay credit, Schut received screen story credit, and Brian, Cauffiel, Hart, Ruzowitzky, and Schwentke received off-screen additional literary material credit.

=== Casting ===
In June 2021, David Dastmalchian, Liam Cunningham, Aisling Franciosi, Javier Botet, Jon Jon Briones, Stefan Kapičić, Nikolai Nikolaeff, Woody Norman, Martin Furulund and Chris Walley joined the cast of the film.

=== Filming ===
Principal photography began on June 30, 2021, in Berlin, before occurring in Malta, and ended on October 1. Some of the movie scenes were also recorded in the fortress city of Mdina, and at Fort Ricasoli.

=== Special makeup and visual effects ===
Göran Lundström served as makeup designer on the film. Lundström initially declined the position when it was offered to him by Fischer in 2021, as Lundström was then working as a makeup artist on the biographical crime drama film House of Gucci, but he later joined the project. Lundström described the process of fully applying prosthetic makeup to Botet as having taken "a long time, it was like a four-hour application. They're never as long as actors say they are, but I don't think Javier has exaggerated this one. Usually, we aim for three hours, which is a normal makeup time for full coverage, but for this creature suit, sticking things on and gluing things down and covering it, it was a four-hour job."

Lundström said that the practical makeup effects team collaborated little with the post-production team responsible for creating the film's computer-generated imagery (CGI) effects, stating, "We did interact a little on set; I showed them what we had, I gave them scans of all our sculptures, they took photos of all the eyeballs we had made to put in front of Javier's eyes, and they scanned him on set in the suit. But for the rest of it, we weren't really involved, which is a shame."

=== Music ===
In April 2022, Thomas Newman was originally announced as the composer for the film. However, in June 2023, Newman left the project due to scheduling conflicts, with Bear McCreary replacing him. The soundtrack album was released on August 11, 2023, the same day as the theatrical release.

== Release ==
The Last Voyage of the Demeter was released theatrically in the United States on August 11, 2023, by Universal Pictures. It was previously scheduled for January 27, 2023.

=== Home media ===
The Last Voyage of the Demeter was released for digital platforms on August 29, 2023, followed by a Blu-ray and DVD release on October 17, 2023, by Universal Pictures Home Entertainment. It was released on Ultra HD Blu-ray on February 11, 2025, by Shout! Studios.

In the UK, the film's previously announced Summer 2023 theatrical release was indefinitely delayed shortly before it was meant to come out, due to the impending acquisition of Amblin Partners' British distribution partner, Entertainment One, by Lionsgate. As a result, the film wouldn't be released in UK territories until October 7, 2024, released by Lionsgate Films UK on VOD services.

The film was also released physically by Dazzler Media in the UK on February 3, 2025, on DVD, Blu-ray and 4K UHD.

== Reception ==
=== Box office ===
The Last Voyage of the Demeter grossed $13.6 million in the United States and Canada and $8.2 million in other territories, for a worldwide total of $21.8 million.

In the United States and Canada, The Last Voyage of the Demeter was projected to gross $6–11 million from 2,715 theaters. The film made $2.6 million on its first day, including $750,000 from Thursday night previews. It went on to debut to $6.5 million, finishing fifth at the box office. The film dropped 62% in its second weekend to $2.5 million, falling to tenth.

=== Critical response ===
On the review aggregator website Rotten Tomatoes, 50% of 202 critics' reviews are positive, with an average rating of 5.7/10. The website's consensus reads: "The Last Voyage of the Demeter finds a fresh angle on Dracula's oft-told tale, although lackluster execution often undercuts the story's claustrophobic tension." Metacritic, which uses a weighted average, assigned the film a score of 52 out of 100, based on 33 critics, indicating "mixed or average" reviews. Audiences surveyed by CinemaScore gave the film an average grade of "B–" on an A+ to F scale, while those polled at PostTrak gave it a 66% overall positive score.

Vulture's Bilge Ebiri wrote, "What truly distinguishes Last Voyage of the Demeter, beyond its thick atmosphere of dread, is its gleeful cruelty, the delicious mean streak with which it sets up its suspense set pieces and its kills... The film is filled with delightfully savage surprises. And suddenly, in this most predetermined of movies, anything seems possible." Peter Sobczynski of RogerEbert.com gave the film 3.5/4 stars, calling it "a smart, well-made, and sometimes downright creepy take on the tale that both horror buffs and regular moviegoers can appreciate in equal measure." The Boston Globe's Odie Henderson gave it 3/4 stars, writing, "This is good, fun summer fare, shot in ominous shades of darkness by cinematographers Roman Osin and Tom Stern and fueled by an effective score by Bear McCreary that isn't obtrusive."

Frank Scheck of The Hollywood Reporter praised Øvredal's direction, but added, "he's not able to bring much spark to Bragi Schut, Jr. and Zak Olkewicz's slow-paced, formulaic screenplay, which lacks the dark wit necessary to keep us invested in the gory proceedings." The Guardian's Benjamin Lee gave it 2/5 stars, writing, "There's no real surprise to where we're heading, given the source material, and so a great deal of the film is a rather meandering wait for the inevitable. It's ultimately a doomed voyage: for the crew, for the audience and for Universal's monster movie strategy at large." IndieWire's David Ehrlich gave it a D grade, saying that Øvredal "falls back on chaos and cruelty, his movie sorely lacking the sense of dread required to justify either one", and concluded, "if you're going to make an R-rated horror wank about Dracula slurping throats with a smile on his face, make sure that the rest of the movie doesn't suck as hard as he does."

Horror author Stephen King (who wrote the vampire-centered 'Salem's Lot) praised the film, calling it "a throat-ripping good time" that "reminded [him] of the best of the Hammer movies from the 60s and 70s." Director Guillermo del Toro also praised the movie, calling it "gorgeous, lavish and savage".

== See also ==
- She Creature, a 2001 horror made-for-television film with a similar plot.
