= Ken Urban =

American dramatist

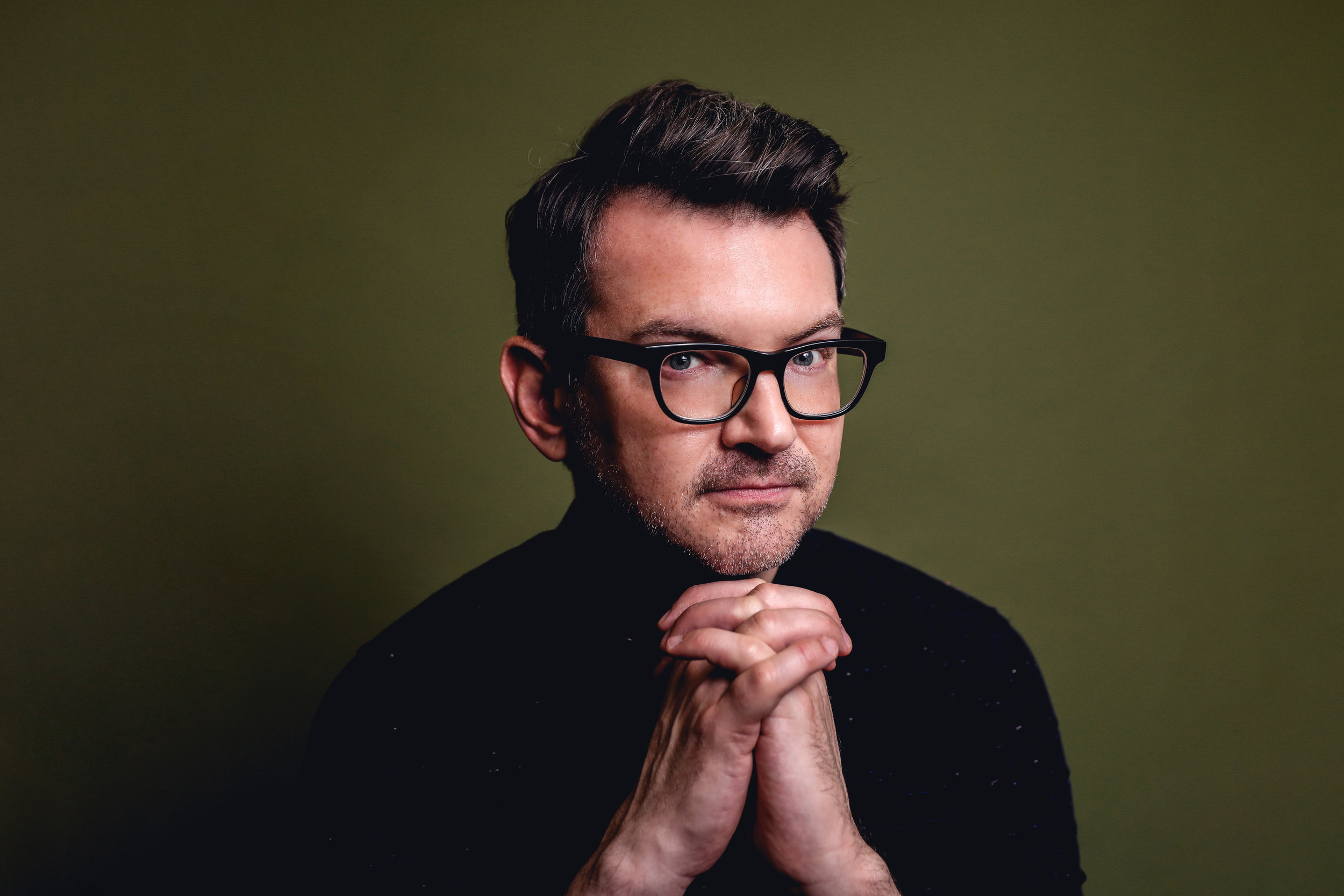
- Born: New Jersey
- Education: Bucknell University (Bachelor's) Rutgers University (Master's) Rutgers University (PhD)
- Occupations: Playwright, Musician, Lecturer
- Website: kenurban.org

Ken Urban is an American playwright, screenwriter, and musician based in New York. Urban is an alumnus of New Dramatists and an affiliated writer at the Playwrights' Center.

He is a senior lecturer of Theater Arts and the Director of Dramatic Writing at the Massachusetts Institute of Technology. Previously he has taught writing at Harvard University, Princeton University, Tufts University, and Davidson College.

Urban's play The Happy Sad, had its first production at the Summer Play Festival at The Public Theater. He adapted the play into a screenplay, and in 2013, it was released as a feature film directed by Rodney Evans. His play Danger and Opportunity won a 2025 Drama Desk Special Award for its intimate production at the East Village Basement. His play about internet content moderators,The Moderate, won the 2026 Elliot Norton Award for Outstanding New Script.

== Background ==
Urban attended Bucknell University, and graduated magna cum laude in English in 1996. He earned a Master's and Ph.D. in English Literature from Rutgers University in 2006. After receiving his doctorate, Urban taught at Harvard University for 8 years, and has since held teaching positions at Princeton University and Tufts University, focusing on instruction related to playwriting, screenwriting, academic writing, and dramatic literature. Urban is currently a senior lecturer and Director of Dramatic Writing at the Massachusetts Institute of Technology and has been since 2017. There, he founded the annual Playwright's Lab, a play festival featuring student-written plays read by local professional actors.

Urban has a portfolio that includes sixteen full-length plays and seventeen short plays, and has had plays produced both Off-Broadway and on London's West End. Further included in his portfolio are screenplays and albums and songs from the band Occurrence — which Urban is the lead member of. He founded and runs the record label Archie & Fox Records with composer Daniel Kluger.

== Plays ==
=== Produced plays ===
- 2001: I (Heart) KANT (Moving Arts)
- 2007: The Private Lives of Eskimos (The Committee)
- 2009: The Happy Sad (The Public Theater)
- 2013: The Awake (59E59 Theaters)
- 2014: The Correspondent (Rattlestick Playwrights Theater)
- 2015: A Future Perfect (Speakeasy Stage Company)
- 2015: Sense of an Ending (Theatre503)
- 2017: Nibbler (Rattlestick Playwrights Theater)
- 2017: A Guide for the Homesick (Huntington Theatre Company)
- 2018: The Remains (Studio Theatre)
- 2022: Vapor Trail (Tribeca Festival)
- 2025: Danger and Opportunity (East Village Basement)
- 2026: The Moderate (Central Square Theater)
- 2027: The Conquered (American Blues Theater)

== TV and film ==
=== Pilots ===
- The Art of Listening (Optioned by ITV and Madison Wells Media)

=== Feature films ===
- 2013: The Happy Sad (Produced by IFC and Miasma Films and directed by Rodney Evans)

=== Short films ===
- 2013: I Am a Great Big Ball of Saddness (Produced by Manhattan Short Film Festival and directed by Chris Tyler)

== Music ==
Urban is a co-founder of the band Occurrence, which also features vocalists Cat Hollyer and Johnny Hager.

=== Occurrence (band) ===
==== Albums ====
- 2016: The Past Will Last Forever
- 2018: Everyone Knows the Disaster is Coming
- 2021: I Have So Much Love to Give
- 2023: Slow Violence
- 2025: Real Friend
- 2025: Real Person
- 2026: Gemini Hole

==== Singles / EPs ====
- 2017: "The Time of Year"
- 2018: "All of Your Devils"
- 2018: "If He Were Here"
- 2020: "All My Days" (2020 Version)
- 2020: "All My Days" (Remix H1987)
- 2020: "Dead Sleep Best"
- 2020: "Privacy Invaders"
- 2021: "I Have So Much Love to Give"
- 2021: "The Happy Years"
- 2021: "Boy Joy"
- 2021: "My Eternal Autumn"
- 2022: Music from Vapor Trail EP (with Daniel Kluger)
- 2023: Dissolve EP
- 2025: "Feeding Time"
- 2025: "Opportunity Window"
- 2026: “Happiness Patrol”
- 2026: “Gemini Hole”
- 2026: “Psychic Driver”
- 2026: “Unlit Cigarette”

== Awards and honors ==
=== Awards ===
- 2007: Playwriting Fellowship, Huntington Theatre Company, Boston, MA
- 2007: Nancy Quinn Grant, A.R.T./NY, NYC
- 2008: L. Arnold Weissberger New Play Award (for Sense of an Ending)
- 2010: Dramatists Guild Fellowship, NYC
- 2016: New York Foundation for the Arts Fellowship for Playwriting/Screenwriting
- 2018: Independent Reviewers of New England Award for Best New Play (for A Guide for the Homesick)
- 2023: A IS FOR Playwriting Contest (2nd Place Winner) (for Cath Carroll)
- 2024: Winner of the Blue Ink Award for Playwriting (for The Conquered)
- 2025: Drama Desk Winner of Special Award (for Danger and Opportunity)
- 2025: Levitan Teaching Award at MIT
- 2026: Elliot Norton Award for Outstanding New Script (for The Moderate)

== Residencies ==
- 2003: Soho Rep Writer/Director Lab, NY
- 2008: MacDowell Fellow, MacDowell, Peterborough, NH
- 2009: MacDowell Fellow, MacDowell, Peterborough, NH
- 2012 Djerassi Resident Artists Program, Woodside, CA
- 2014 Core Writer, Three-Year Residency, Playwrights' Center, Minneapolis, MN
- 2015 Selected Playwright, R&D Group, The Civilians, NYC
- 2015 Artist in Residence, Headlands Center for the Arts, Sausalito, CA
- 2016 Member Playwright, Multi-Year Residency, New Dramatists, NY
- 2017 Affiliated Writer, Playwrights' Center, Minneapolis, MN
- 2019 Artist in Residence, Millay Colony, Austerlitz, NY
- 2020 Selected Playwright, Keen Playwrights Lab, Keen Company, New York, NY
- 2020 Selected Playwright, R&D Group, The Civilians, NYC
- 2020 EST/Alfred P. Sloan Science & Technology Project Commission
- 2022 MacDowell Fellow, MacDowell, Peterborough, NH
- 2023 MacDowell Fellow, MacDowell, Peterborough, NH
- 2023 Venturous Theater Fund Finishing Commission
