= The Happy Sad =

- Film poster
- Directed by: Rodney Evans
- Written by: Ken Urban
- Produced by: Tory Lenosky
- Starring: Leroy McClain; Sorel Carradine; Charlie Barnett; Cameron Scoggins
- Edited by: Sabine Hoffman
- Release date: June 25, 2013 (Frameline)
- Country: United States
- Language: English

The Happy Sad is a 2013 film directed by Rodney Evans, based on a play of the same name by Ken Urban. It follows the interacting journeys of two young couples in New York City who decide to push the boundaries of relationships and sexuality.

The film premiered at the 2013 Frameline Film Festival.

== Plot ==
In New York City, young schoolteacher Annie tells her musician boyfriend Stan that she wants to take a break. Meanwhile, Marcus and Aaron are two young men who have been in a committed relationship for six years, and decide to try an open relationship. Both Stan and Annie end up experimenting with same-sex encounters, with the former meeting Marcus online and hooking up; eventually Aaron walks in on them and becomes increasingly hurt and insecure as he discovers that Marcus is falling for Stan. After Annie goes on a blind date with an older man, she eventually gets together with fellow schoolteacher Mandy, who has been her confidante. After some soul searching and several explosive encounters, Stan and Annie return to each other, as do Marcus and Aaron, while Mandy meets a new partner.

== Cast ==
- Leroy McClain as Marcus
- Sorel Carradine as Annie
- Charlie Barnett as Aaron
- Cameron Scoggins as Stan
- Maria Dizzia as Mandy
- Sue Jean Kim as Alice
- Jamie Harrold as Neil
- Michael Nathanson as David
