= Haunted Poland =

- Theatrical release poster
- Directed by: Pau Masó
- Starring: Ewelina Lukaszewska; Pau Masó; Irene González; Dominik Lukaszewski
- Edited by: Pau Masó
- Production companies: Maso & Co Productions
- Release date: November 20, 2011 (AIFF)
- Running time: 103 minutes
- Country: Poland
- Languages: English; Polish

Haunted Poland (Polish: Nawiedzona Polska) is a 2011 horror film in the found footage genre, pieced together from amateur footage. The film was produced by Maso & Co Productions. Told cinéma vérité-style, Haunted Poland depicts the contents of recorded tape filmed by a couple Ewelyn (Ewelina Lukaszewska), and Pau (Pau Masó) who visited Poland to meet and visit family. However, our duo soon find themselves disturbed by all manner of strange phenomena upon visiting the girl's hometown where she once played with a ouija board. The film premiered at the AIFF on November 20, 2011.

A sequel, Haunted Poland: The Origins (Polish: Nawiedzona Polska 2), has been announced.

== Plot ==
In 2011, a couple living in America, Ewelina and Pau, travel to Chodecz, Poland to meet the girl's family. As the film goes by, strange phenomena occurs, but her reluctant "non-believing" boyfriend, just pokes fun at her instead of supporting her, while she is actually having a hard time.

== Cast ==
- Ewelina Lukaszewska as Ewelyn
- Pau Masó as Pau
- Irene González as Irene
- Dominik Lukszewski as Ewelyn's brother

== Production ==
Filming began in July 2011 and lasted seven days.

== Release ==
The film will premiere at the 2011 American International Film Festival (AIFF) on November 20 as well as the Sundance Film Festival.

== Reception ==
In response to the negative response to the trailer the director released a statement on Dread Central "Haunted Poland was meant to be an 'experimental' project, says director Masó" and continues "This is not a Hollywood film with a budget of 20 million dollars. This film was completely shot on a consumer camera, with an estimate budget of 1000.00$." Additionally, the actor insisted later on, that the film was independent by making this statement "This movie is a no-budget and will be approximately 90 minutes".

== Awards and nominations ==
In October 2011 Haunted Poland won "Best Movie/Documentary/Video/Script featuring Religious/Supernatural theme" at the American International Film Festival 2011.
