= The Sleeping Soul =

- Promotional poster
- Directed by: Shawn Burkett
- Written by: Shawn Burkett
- Screenplay by: Ryan Stacy
- Produced by: Shawn Burkett; Ryan Stacy; Corey A. Thrush
- Starring: Ayse Howard; Corey A. Thrush
- Edited by: Shawn Burkett
- Music by: Josh Hamilton
- Production company: Concept Media LLC.
- Release date: March 3, 2012
- Running time: 54 minutes
- Country: United States
- Language: English

The Sleeping Soul is an independent supernatural horror film written and directed by film writer and producer Shawn Burkett. The story centers on Grace (Ayse Howard) as she is haunted after the traumatic death of her husband (Corey A. Thrush). The film was released in March 2012.

== Plot ==
The Official Site (taken down after the premiere) listed this as the plot summary:

The Sleeping Soul is a story about a woman "Grace" who has lost her

fiance & unborn son to a drunk driving accident.

Almost a year after the accident Grace is beginning to recover from the tragedy, until her vivid nightmares & paranormal occurrences begin to push her to the edge. The line between sane & insane begins

to blur as the days grow closer to the one year anniversary.

The adds more details. The trailer begins with her sitting at her computer, filming a video diary, with smudged makeup and a somber face. She begins, choked up, "It is the one-year anniversary of when my fiancee died." A ghost (assumed to be her husband's spirit) torments her in between her next video diary, moving things eerily while she is in the shower. In the next video diary she says "It's constantly toying with me...I don't know how much more I can take." We see her recklessly taking pills and drinking in an obvious downward spiral. The trailer ends with an unexplained startling noise apparently brought on by her dead fiancée.

== Cast ==
- Ayse Howard as Grace James
- Corey A. Thrush as Cover Masterson
- Scott Gillespie as Drunk Driver
- Elizabeth Bright as Taylor Masterson
- Conor Elwood Burkett as Young Conor Masterson
- Luke Burnett as Conor Masterson

== Reception ==
Horror Society rated The Sleeping Soul 3/5 stars, and Bloody Disgusting rated it 0.5/5 stars.

== Background ==
The Sleeping Soul was based on a short story Shawn Burkett wrote in late 2010. He later started a small independent film company and began shooting films. This was his second. The Sleeping Soul was filmed in January 2012, and premiered on March 3, 2012.

== Accolades ==
The Sleeping Soul was an official selection of the 2012 Fright Night Film Fest, a horror convention located in Louisville, Kentucky.

== See also ==
- List of ghost films
- Psychological horror
