= Kissing Darkness =

- Love has never been so cruel
- Directed by: James Townsend
- Written by: James Townsend
- Produced by: James Townsend; Eric Kertudo; Thierry Willems
- Starring: Kyle Blitch; Ronnie Kroell; Sean Paul Lockhart; Daniel Berilla; Griffin Marc; Nick Airus
- Cinematography: Steven Vasquez
- Edited by: Steven Vasquez
- Production company: Kerwi
- Release date: February 5, 2014
- Country: United States
- Language: English
- Budget: $30,000 (estimated)

Kissing Darkness is a 2014 horror-thriller comedy film directed and written by James Townsend and starring Kyle Blitch, Ronnie Kroell, Sean Paul Lockhart, Daniel Berilla, Griffin Marc and Nick Airus. The film was shot in Southern California in late summer 2012.

== Plot ==
A group of college boys, bored with the every day "gay life" of LA, decide to skip Pride weekend in exchange for a camping trip in the woods. Quickly overcome with boredom in their new surroundings, the boys venture into a game that ultimately unleashes the vengeful spirit of a local legend known as Malice Valeria. Overcome by her deadly plan of tainted love and her thirst to take back what was lost long ago, the boys must now band together before they fall victim to the poisons of a broken heart.

== Cast ==
- Ronnie Kroell as Brett
- Sean Paul Lockhart as Jonathan
- Nick Airus as Vlad
- Kyle Blitch as Skylar
- James Townsend as Brendan
- Daniel Berilla as Ashton
- Marc Griffin as Keith
- Sean Benedict as Brendan's Lover
- Ish Bermudez as Vampire Victim
- Roger Duplease as Fiancé
- Griffin Marc as Keith
- Allusia Alusia as Lesbian #1
- Kyan Loredo as Best Friend
- Misty Violet as Lesbian #2

== Production ==
The film had been in and out of production since 2006. The fourth attempt made it a reality. Donna Michelle, sister of writer/director, James Townsend, was originally slated to play the role of Malice Valeria. Townsend was originally supposed to play the lead role of Brett. However, once production was on the fast track, he stepped down from the role, only allowing himself to accept the much smaller role of Brendan. The film originally was slated to star Benjamin Gilbert (aka Caleb Carter). After Gilbert's death in February 2009, the film was put on hold. In 2012, Daniel Berilla was included by Townsend despite some initial reluctance by the producers.
