= Rodney Evans (filmmaker) =

American filmmaker (born 1971)

- Occupation: Filmmaker
- Notable work: Brother to Brother, The Happy Sad
- Website: http://www.rodneyevansfilm.com

Rodney Evans (born 1971) is an American filmmaker and lecturer based in New York City. Evans was born in Brooklyn and grew up in Queens. He graduated with a Bachelor of Fine Arts in modern culture and media from Brown University in 1993, and a Master of Fine Arts in film production from the California Institute of the Arts in 1996.

In 2004, he produced his first feature-length film, Brother to Brother, telling the story of the challenges faced by a young gay black man who meets a survivor of the Harlem Renaissance. Brother to Brother was awarded the Special Jury Prize for Drama in the 2004 Sundance Film Festival, as well as obtaining awards in numerous other film festivals such as Outfest, the Roxbury Film Festival and Seattle Gay and Lesbian Film Festival.

In 2008 Evans was awarded a Guggenheim Fellowship and a Creative Capital Foundation Grant. In 2009, Evans produced a short documentary drama, Billy and Aaron, about the experiences of jazz musician Billy Strayhorn as a gay man in the 40s; this film was the official selection at the 2010 Tribeca Film Festival.

In 2013 he released his second feature film, The Happy Sad, based on a Ken Urban play and portraying two very different young couples in Brooklyn who decide to explore the boundaries of gender and sexuality. The film premiered at the IFC Center and the Sundance Cinemas.

Evans has been a lecturer in visual arts at Princeton University since 2015.

== See also ==
- Dramatic license
- LGBT culture in New York City
- List of LGBT people from New York City
- NYC Pride March

== Filmography ==
- The Unveiling (1996)
- Close to Home (1998; short film)
- Two Encounters (1999; short film)
- Brother to Brother (2004)
- Billy and Aaron (2010; short film)
- The Happy Sad (2013)
- Daydream (2014)
- Persistence of Vision (2016)
- Vision Portraits (2019)
