= Schoolboy Crush (film) =

2004 gay pornographic film

- Directed by: Bryan Phillips
- Starring: Brent Corrigan; Brent Everett
- Production company: Cobra Video
- Distributed by: Cobra Video
- Release date: 2004
- Running time: 118 minutes
- Country: United States
- Language: English

Schoolboy Crush is a 2004 gay pornographic film directed by Bryan Kocis (under the industry name "Bryan Phillips"), released on Cobra Video, and cast with Brent Everett and Sean Paul Lockhart under the stage name "Brent Corrigan". Corrigan being underage at the time of filming led to legal actions against Phillips and the withdrawal of the film Schoolboy Crush from the Cobra Video film catalog.

== Controversy ==
Corrigan appeared in four Cobra Video projects after using what proved to have been fake identification: his debut industry film Every Poolboy's Dream (2004), Schoolboy Crush, Bareboned Twinks (2005), and Casting Couch 4 (2005). On September 13, 2005, it was alleged that Corrigan's work with Cobra Video in these four titles had been while he was underage. Cobra denied the allegations providing, as required by law, copies of Corrigan's identity documents claiming a 1985 birth year. Kocis filed a counter lawsuit concerning the contractual issues to which the underage Corrigan contracted with Cobra. All four titles were voluntarily removed from circulation due to the underage dispute. Schoolboy Crush has remained very popular and available for sale on internet auction sites and footage from the film appears frequently online.

The contractual dispute resurfaced when Kocis was found dead after a fire at his Dallas Township, Pennsylvania home. The investigating coroner found that Kocis was dead before the fire, stabbed many times and his throat cut. Harlow Cuadra and Joseph Kerekes were arrested, charged and convicted. During Harlow Cuadra's murder trial, it was revealed that Corrigan was "contractually bound" to perform sex acts for money for Bryan Phillips' Cobra Video company leading to on-going public discussion about the legality of such adult industry contracts. Corrigan also testified during the trial.

Cobra Killer: Gay Porn Murder was written by authors Andrew E. Stoner and Peter A. Conway, and published in June 2012 on Magnus Books. The book recounted the circumstances of Bryan Kocis' murder, and issues around Kocis's dealings including the contractual affairs with Corrigan.
