= Truth (2013 film) =

- Directed by: Rob Moretti
- Written by: Rob Moretti
- Produced by: Ashley Ahn; Sean Paul Lockhart; Bradley J. Fischer
- Starring: Sean Paul Lockhart; Rob Moretti; Blanche Baker
- Edited by: Cassandra McManus
- Music by: Jonathan Bartz
- Production company: Left of Center Entertainment
- Distributed by: Artsploitation Films
- Release dates: July 12, 2013 (QFest Philadelphia); February 11, 2014 (United States)
- Running time: 94 minutes
- Country: United States
- Language: English

Truth is a 2013 American psychological thriller film directed and written by Rob Moretti and starring Sean Paul Lockhart, Blanche Baker, and Rob Moretti. It was filmed in Englewood Cliffs, New Jersey and Montclair, New Jersey, United States.

== Plot ==
After a chance encounter over the internet, Caleb (Sean Paul Lockhart), who has borderline personality disorder, meets and falls head over heels for Jeremy (Rob Moretti), and soon the line between love and lies blur. Struggling to keep his past a secret, including his mentally ill mother, Caleb slowly succumbs to his darker side. A sudden turn of events finds Jeremy held captive, until Caleb's quest for the truth is revealed.

== Cast ==
- Sean Paul Lockhart ... Caleb Jacobs
- Rob Moretti ... Jeremy Dorian
- Blanche Baker ... Dr. Carter Moore
- Suzanne Didonna ... Caleb's mother
- Rebekah Aramini ... Leah
- Max Rhyser ... Young man in the cafe
- Philip Joseph McElroy ... Young Caleb
- John Van Steen ... Orderly

== Critical reception ==
Truth garnered mixed to negative reviews. At Metacritic, the film scored a 23, based on 4 reviews.

Inkoo Kang of Village Voice wrote "Truth is hammier than Easter brunch, but its depictions of rejection transfiguring into violence are always affecting and distressing."

Frank Scheck of The Hollywood Reporter said, "Its Hitchcockian aspirations are sabotaged by a tendency towards lurid melodrama that is more laughable than chilling."

Jay Weissberg of Variety commented: "A low-budget potboiler with an overblown score not loud enough to drown out the hackneyed dialogue."

Jeannette Catsoulis of The New York Times wrote of the story, "Filled with sappy dialogue and screeching strings, Truth is a puerile excavation of secrets and sickness."
