= Brent Corrigan =

American film and pornographic film actor

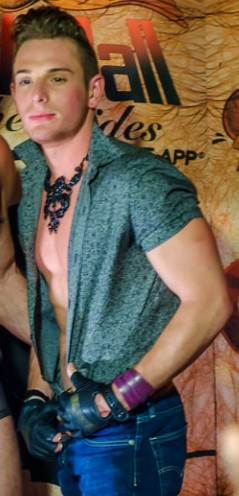
- Corrigan in 2014
- Born: Sean Paul Lockhart; October 31, 1986 (age 39); Lewiston, Idaho, U.S.
- Other name: Fox Ryder
- Occupations: Actor; director; pornographic actor
- Years active: 2004–present

Sean Paul Lockhart (born October 31, 1986), known by his stage name Brent Corrigan, is an American film actor and director, known for Milk (2008), Judas Kiss (2011), and Triple Crossed (2013).

Lockhart started his career as a gay pornographic film actor mostly using the moniker "Brent Corrigan", except in The Velvet Mafia parts 1 and 2 (2006) and Best of Roman Heart (2008), in which he used the stage name Fox Ryder. In 2010, he left pornography to focus almost exclusively on gay-themed movies and independent films, such as Judas Kiss, Sister Mary, Another Gay Sequel: Gays Gone Wild!, Welcome to New York, and others. In 2011, he starred in the horror comedy anthology film Chillerama, directed by Tim Sullivan, as Ricky in the musical segment "I Was A Teenage Werebear". In 2011, he received the Rising Star Award at the Philadelphia QFest Festival.

In 2012, he announced his involvement in the production of an independent film titled Truth, directed by Rob Moretti and co-starring Lockhart and Moretti. In 2013, he directed the mystery-thriller Triple Crossed. He returned to gay pornography in 2016 with Falcon Studios' Deep Release.

== Early life ==
Sean Paul Lockhart was born October 31, 1986, in Lewiston, Idaho. He is one of four siblings; he has an older brother and a younger brother and sister. He and his siblings were raised in the suburb of Mill Creek, near Seattle, Washington, with their stepfather. His mother and stepfather divorced when he was aged 8 to 9 years, after which the household broke down.

His first boyfriend introduced him to a "fast, furious, out-of-control side to the gay scene", with which he was not comfortable. This boyfriend introduced Lockhart, then 17, to the gay pornographic industry and arranged for Lockhart to audition for a pornographic film from Lockhart's own bedroom via webcam. The boyfriend controlled the camera while the owner of Cobra Video, Bryan Kocis, observed.

Lockhart agreed to perform in filmed sex scenes with Kocis in six "action video scenes" and one "non-action" video scene in consideration for a used Volkswagen Jetta. A sexual relationship developed between Lockhart and Kocis. Lockhart was under 18 when their relationship began, and it ended before his 18th birthday.

== Gay pornographic career ==
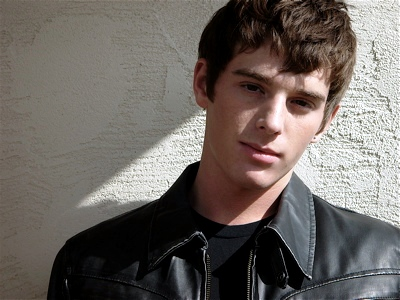
Lockhart as Brent Corrigan prior to 2008

Lockhart started his career in gay pornography in 2004, aged 17, using the stage names Brent Corrigan and Fox Ryder in Every Poolboy's Dream. He played roles in gay porn films, notably with Cobra Video and Pink Bird Media. He has also made films with Active Duty and Jet Set Men.

In September 2005, Lockhart publicly stated he was 17 when he made his first films, thus was under the legal age of consent in 11 states, including California. His first four films were pulled voluntarily from circulation by Cobra Video through their distributor, Pacific Sun Entertainment.

He launched his own production company in 2006. He was still working for many other gay pornographic studios at the time, and his first own film using condoms was Summit (2008). In previous films, he was known for not using them. The film won the GayVN Awards Best Pro/Am Film 2009.

=== Murder case of Bryan Kocis ===
Lockhart's former boyfriend, Bryan Kocis, was the owner of Cobra Video and was found dead at his home on January 24, 2007. Two Virginia Beach male escorts, Harlow Cuadra and Joseph Kerekes, were arrested and charged with Kocis's murder.

In 2008, Kerekes pled guilty and was sentenced to life in prison without parole. Cuadra pled not guilty and went to trial on February 24, 2009. On March 16, 2009, he was sentenced to life in prison without the possibility of parole. Lockhart testified for the prosecution.

Prosecutors said the motives for the murder were to destroy the competition and to make a "million-dollar" film starring Lockhart, who had been involved in litigation with Cobra over the rights to his stage name "Brent Corrigan"; the matter settled before Kocis's death. As part of that settlement, the proceeds of profits were to be split 50/50. Cobra and Lockhart had agreed to the use of condoms in filming. On April 7, 2009, Cuadra appealed his life sentence. Lockhart had earlier cooperated with authorities and helped them find the suspects. He testified in the Cuadra trial. The murder was dramatized in the 2016 film King Cobra.

=== Safer sex advocacy ===
In a 2008 interview with Chicago Pride, Lockhart said he had consented to doing bareback as he was falsely informed he was being "protected" by the producer by the method used of pairing models. He went on to say, then age 21, "Fortunately, I got out of that alive and HIV negative! I am still negative today." In the interview, he also warned other young gay men against unprotected sex. He stated, "there are no guarantees, even with testing" and reiterated that barebacking was risky and stated "the message it sends is not one I want to be a part of anymore". During the interview he stated, "I would like to stand up for young men who are/were put in similar, compromising positions as I was at Cobra Video. I want to take a stand for HIV awareness." He has been a vocal advocate of safer sex and has remained critical of the pornographic industry for its continued release of bareback pornography, which he says sends out the wrong message to young gay men.

During a 2013 interview with Chicago Pride, on being asked if he has kept in contact with any of the other Cobra actors, he replied "No. There were few I was close with – but mostly the civil suit, and the pressure Bryan Kocis put on the other models, not to have anything to do with me and then Bryan's death pretty much put an end of the friendships I'd garnered there. From what I've heard some have moved on nicely enough. Some aren't even alive anymore. I randomly saw one in a San Francisco gym during Pride a few years ago but thought better of stopping him to say hello. It's a chapter of my life I don't like to revel in." He stated in the interview that the trend in the pornographic industry is toward unprotected, unsafe sex. He has warned about the social impact on gay and bisexual men's decision-making, especially when in the heat of lust and passion while influenced by alcohol or drugs.

In 2008, Lockhart received Best Twink Performer – Bottom at the Golden Dickie Awards, was winner of GayVN Awards for Fuck Me Raw (2006); 2009 Best Bottom, 2009 Best Pro/Am Film for Summit (2008); 2009 Best Twink Film for Just the Sex 1 & 2 (2008); 2010 Best Bottom, 2010 Web Performer of the Year, and 2010 Best Amateur / Pro-Am Release for the Big Easy (2010). In 2018, he won GayVN Award for Best Actor for Ultra Fan (by Falcon Studios).

=== Adult web site business ===
Lockhart started in 2012 and owned his own gay pornographic adult website, TheNewBrentCorrigan, which went offline in September 2016.

== Acting career ==
He had a small role as Skippy in the short film "Tell Me", a co-starring role (as Sean Lockhart) in the rock musical short "Didn't This Used to Be Fun?", and a starring role as Press in a short film directed by Jody Wheeler entitled In the Closet. He appeared in the television series Red Hot Star in 2006 in which AOL searched the country for talented teens who think they have what it takes to create and star in their own show. He also appeared in a TV talk show, Brent Corrigan at Iris.

Also in 2009, he appeared in a gay short film compilation Boys on Film 3: American Boy, released by Peccadillo Pictures, the company that made it possible for Lockhart to record an album with songs by the Swedish songwriter and accordionist Roland Cedermark.

Lockhart played Stan the Merman in 2008 Another Gay Sequel: Gays Gone Wild. He appeared as one of the people on the telephone tree in Gus Van Sant's Milk, based on the life of Harvey Milk. He had a guest appearance in Casper Andreas' film The Big Gay Musical as Hustler and played Chad in the 2011 feature Sister Mary, directed and written by Scott Grenke. He also starred as Chris Wachowsky in the gay coming-of-age fantasy Judas Kiss.

He starred as Ricky in the musical Chillerama segment "I Was A Teenage Werebear", about a "closeted kid who meets these other closeted kids, who when aroused turn into leather daddy werebears". It was directed by Tim Sullivan. In conjunction with this, he appeared in Full Moon Fever: Behind the Scenes of I Was a Teenage Werebear, a documentary short, and Chillerama Presents: Anton Troy, the Man Behind the Beast, both in 2011.

Lockhart received the 2011 Rising Star Award and was also interviewed in 2012 by Brian Westerley, the show's host at the Interbelt Nite Club (short) and appeared on the Brent Everett TV series Brent Corrigan and Brent Everett: Splash's New Year's, also in 2012. After appearing in the comedy short "Welcome to New York", Lockhart co-starred as Caleb, with Rob Moretti, in the latter's 2013 psychological thriller film Truth.

The film was released internationally on January 10, 2014, after appearing in a number of film festivals. In 2013, he was also credited "with thanks" in the film Luna Park. In the same year, he appeared in a documentary about the internet porn industry titled I'm a Porn Star, directed by Charlie David;Outspoken, a TV miniseries documentary; and Hometown Pornstar.

After the filming of Truth, he told Palm Springs Life in an interview in September 2014 that he was "falling apart" due to memories of his own life experiences that were helpful to the character but that he found damaging to his health.

In May 2014, he appeared in "Stranger Than Fiction: The Making of Truth", a 14-minute video short. He appeared as Jake Bishop in Jody Wheeler's mystery-thriller film The Dark Place and as Jonathan in James Townsend's horror-thriller Kissing Darkness.

== Film director ==
While working for Pink Media between 2008 and 2010, he directed five gay pornographic films: Summit (2008), Just the Sex (2008), Brent Corrigan's Big Easy (2009), Brent Corrigan's Working Hard (2010), and Brent Corrigan's Heat (2010).

He directed his own general release mystery-thriller film, written by Linda Andersson, titled Triple Crossed (2013), an America Unrated film, in which he also played the role of Andrew Warner. He also appears in the "Triple Crossed Behind the Scenes" documentary short.

=== Reviews ===
Reviews for Triple Crossed were mixed. The CinemaQueer commented, "Triple Crossed is a low budget, yet somewhat nifty, sexual thriller." Gay Celluloid said, "Filled with some passionate scenes of man-on-man lip-service and more, backed by the vibrant music of Chad Siwik and filmed, in part, in the lush location of Topanga Canyon, California, this feature frankly ticks many of the requisite boxes on the 'festival favourites' checklist and goes on to say what makes this work of particular note, is that the film cinematically marks the directorial debut of Sean Paul Lockhart; perhaps better known to the gay world as Brent Corrigan." Big Gay Picture Show said: "Triple Crossed may have its flaws, but it's an entertaining thriller with a cute gay romance at its core."

== Filmography ==
=== General release ===
Year	Film	Role	Notes
2008	Another Gay Sequel: Gays Gone Wild!	Stan the Merman	
2008	Milk	Telephone Tree No. 3	
2009	The Big Gay Musical	Hustler	
2011	Judas Kiss	Chris Wachowsky	
2011	Sister Mary	Chad	
2011	Chillerama	Ricky O'Reily	Segment "I Was a Teenage Werebear"
2012	Welcome to New York	Jake	Short film
2013	Truth	Caleb	Co-producer, actor
2013	Triple Crossed	Andrew Warner	Director, actor
2014	Kissing Darkness	Jonathan	
2014	The Dark Place	Jake Bishop	

Music videos
Year	Title	Artist	Role
2010	Like It Rough	Timo Descamps	Victim

=== Adult ===
Year	Title	Studio	Notes
2004	Every Poolboy's Dream	Cobra Video	
2004	Schoolboy Crush	Cobra Video	
2004	Bareboned Twinks	Cobra Video	
2005	Casting Couch 4	Cobra Video	
2005	Cream BBoys	Cobra Video	
2005	Naughty Boy's Toys	Cobra Video	
2006	The Twin Dicks of Hazzard	Miami Studios	
2006	Fuck Me Raw	Cobra Video	
2006	Take It Like a Bitch Boy	Cobra Video	
2006	The Velvet Mafia: Part 1	Falcon Studios	As Fox Ryder
2006	Velvet Mafia 2	Falcon Studios	As Fox Ryder
2006	Casting Couch: Justice	BrentCorriganOnline	
2006	Cam Event 1 and 2	BrentCorriganOnline	
2006	Extra Cardio	BrentCorriganOnline	
2007	Soccer Boys	BrentCorriganOnline	
2007	Smoke and Mirrors	BrentCorriganOnline	
2007	Double Penetration	BrentCorriganOnline	
2008	The Porne Ultimatum	Pink Bird Media	Med student
2008	Summit	Pink Bird Media	Director, actor
2008	Drafted 3	Active Duty	
2008	Just the Sex	Pink Bird Media	
2008	Best of Roman Heart	Falcon Studios	
2009	Just the Sex 2	Pink Bird Media	Director, actor
2009	The Porne Identity	Pink Bird Media	Med student
2009	Brent Corrigan's Big Easy	Pink Bird Media	Director, actor
2009	Best of the 2000s 2	Falcon Studios	
2009	Chris Steele Directors Picks	Falcon Studios	
2010	Brent Corrigan's Working Hard	Pink Bird Media	Director, actor
2010	Getting Levi's Johnson	Jet Set Men	Underwear model
2010	Brent Corrigan's Heat	Pink Bird Media	Director, actor
2011	Beautiful Boy	Cobra Video	
2012	Brent Corrigan Sex Tapes	Cobra Video	Videos
2012	Buttfucked	Jet Set Men	
2014	Jacked	Falcon Studios	
2014	Gay Massage House	Icon Male	
2014	Fathers & Sons	Icon Male	Daniel
2014	America's Finest	Falcon Studios	
2015	Poolside 1	Falcon Studios	
2015	Moving Up	Falcon Studios	
2015	Vegas Hustle	NakedSword	
2015	Magnums	Falcon Studios	
2015	Gods of Porn	NakedSword	
2016	Ultra Fan	NakedSword	
2016	Deep Release	Falcon Studios	
2016	About Last Night	Falcon Studios	
2017	Urban Spokes	Falcon Studios	
2017	Into the Blue	Falcon Studios	
2017	Hook'd	Falcon Studios	
2017	Property Lovers	Falcon Studios	
2017	MXXX The Hardest Ride	NakedSword	
2017	Earthbound – Heaven to Hell 2	Falcon Studios	
2017	Love & Lust in New Orleans	Falcon Studios	
2017	Hidden Palms	Falcon Studios	
2018	Mojave Heat	Falcon Studios	
2018	Loving Brent Corrigan	NakedSword	
2018	Loving Brent Corrigan 2	NakedSword	
2018	A Night at the Entourage	Falcon Studios	
2018	Hungry For Moore	Falcon Studios	
2018	Ultra Fan	NakedSword	

== In popular culture ==
- Lockhart's role in Bryan Kocis' life and the subsequent murder trials of Joseph Kerekes and Harlow Cuadra are detailed in the non-fiction, true-crime book Cobra Killer: Gay Porn Murder, written by authors Andrew E. Stoner and Peter A. Conway, and published by Magnus Books on June 19, 2012.
- Garrett Clayton portrayed Lockhart in the 2016 film King Cobra.

== Accolades ==
Awards and achievements
Preceded by (new creation)	GayVN Awards for Best Bottom; 2009–2010	Succeeded by (award abolished)
Preceded by Leo Giamani	GayVN Awards for Web Performer of the Year; 2010	Succeeded by (award abolished)
Preceded by (incumbent)	QFest's Award for Rising Star; 2011	Succeeded by (incumbent)
Preceded by (unknown)	TLA Gaybies Awards for Best Supporting Actor; 2012	Succeeded by Ezra Miller
Preceded by Max Phillips, Steve Cruz, Rob Romoni, Christian Owen	Grabby Awards for Wall of Fame with Kristofer Weston and Adam Robinson; 2013	Succeeded by Michael Youens, Ellen Friedman, Douglas Richter
Preceded by (incumbent)	Grabby Awards for Lifetime Achievement; 2017	Succeeded by (incumbent)
Preceded by Logan McCree	GayVN Awards for Best Actor; 2018	Succeeded by (incumbent)

== See also ==
- List of male performers in gay porn films
