= Cobra Video =

American gay pornographic studio

Cobra Video is an American independent gay pornographic studio. The company has been the subject of scandals related to founder Bryan Kocis, who engaged in sex with a minor in one instance, and hired an underage actor to perform in another.

Kocis was murdered in 2007, and although Cobra Video's website is still active, there have been no new video releases since Kocis’ death.

== Legal issues ==
In 2002, police found a videotape in the home of Bryan Kocis (then 39) engaged in sexual activity with a 15-year-old boy. Kocis, then owner and producer of Cobra Video and owner of a local adult-video store, met the boy on the internet and transported him to Kocis' hometown. Kocis pled guilty to one count of sexual abuse of a child; he was charged with child pornography and transportation of a minor for sexual purposes. Kocis claimed as a defense that the teenage boy lied about his age.

Pacific Sun Entertainment (Cobra's distributor) advised its retail sellers, in September 2005, to withhold from further distribution four of Cobra's most popular videos (Every Poolboy's Dream, Schoolboy Crush, Bareboned Twinks, and Casting Couch 4) when reports surfaced that a featured model, Brent Corrigan was, at the time of filming, under 18 years of age. Pacific Sun Entertainment further advised, via an industry-wide email, the removal from availability additional Cobra Video product titles (Campus Boys 1 and Campus Boys 2) without reason except that in the past such action stemmed from a problem with distribution of questionable product such as performer's age. The Kocis murder was motivated by a rival studio power play involving Corrigan.

== Kocis death ==
On January 24, 2007, Bryan Kocis was found dead in his Dallas Township, Pennsylvania, home. According to the Luzerne County coroner investigating the death, Kocis was stabbed 28 times and his throat was cut before his body was left in his house, which was set on fire after he died. A folding-style knife was found in the house near Kocis' body. Officials used dental records to identify him, as his body was burned beyond recognition.

In May 2007 Harlow Cuadra and Joseph Kerekes, both adult film actors/producers, were arrested and charged with his murder. Police took the pair into custody after discovering evidence on Kocis' computer hard drive, which survived the fire. Police theorized that the pair killed Kocis because they wanted to work with a particular actor who was under contract to him. Prosecutors believed that one of the suspects e-mailed Kocis, assuming the identity of an aspiring porn actor, and arranged to meet him on January 24, 2007. The e-mail's sender asked to meet Kocis alone. The pair appear on video surveillance buying a gun and a lock-blade folding knife at a local pawn shop. The knife is consistent with the one used to stab Kocis. Additionally, police have audio recordings of one of the suspects saying, "Actually seeing that fucker going down, it's actually sick, but it made me feel better inside. It almost felt like I got revenge and I know that sounds fucked up." In a search of the pair's home, police also found video equipment they believe belonged to Kocis. Both have been sentenced to life in prison without parole.

== In popular culture ==
Cobra Video, its founder Kocis and Brent Corrigan were depicted in the film King Cobra.

== See also ==
- List of pornographic movie studios
