= Aleksandr's Price =

- DVD cover
- Directed by: Pau Masó; David Damen
- Written by: Pau Masó
- Produced by: Pau Masó
- Starring: Pau Masó; Anatoli Grek; Josh Berresford; Samantha Glovin; Keith Dougherty
- Cinematography: David Damen
- Edited by: Pau Masó
- Music by: Dave Klotz
- Production companies: Maso & Co Productions; White Shark Pictures
- Distributed by: Breaking Glass Pictures
- Release dates: July 12, 2013 (QFest); September 1, 2013 (VOD); September 4, 2013 (DVD - France); September 24, 2013 (DVD - U.S. & Canada); October 25, 2013 (DVD - Germany, Austria, Switzerland); April 1, 2014 (iTunes & Amazon Prime)
- Running time: 103 minutes
- Countries: United States; Spain
- Languages: English; Russian

Aleksandr's Price is a 2013 American-Spanish psychological drama film written, edited, and produced by Pau Masó, who additionally co-directs with David Damen. Set in New York City and starring Pau Masó, Anatoli Grek, Josh Berresford, Samantha Glovin, and Keith Dougherty, the film tells the story of a Russian boy in Manhattan who, after losing his mother to suicide, is drawn into becoming a male prostitute.

== Premise ==
Aleksandr's Price is an exploration of American youth in New York City and the excessive use of alcohol and other drugs in the gay community. Aleksandr Ivanov, played by Masó, falls into the dark business of prostitution after the loss of his family, which causes him to develop dissociative identity disorder.

== Cast ==
- Pau Masó as Aleksandr
- Anatoli Grek as Dr. Mary
- Josh Berresford as Keith
- Samantha Glovin as Emma
- Keith Dougherty as Tom

== Production ==
Aleksandr's Price was shot over a period of 25 days in March 2012 in New York City. Masó scouted the talent and locations. Aleksandr's Price released its official trailer in March 2013.

== Release ==
Prior to public release, Aleksandr's Price screened at the Philadelphia QFest on July 12, 2013. The film officially premiered on September 24, 2013.

=== Critical reception ===
The film has received mixed reviews.

In September 2013, Victoria Alexander from "Las Vegas Informer" compared the film to Steve McQueen's 2011 film Shame stating: "Aleksandr’s Price can be viewed as a gay companion to Steve McQueen's Shame, which also dealt with sexual promiscuity in New York City". She also stated the film depicted prostitution very well, saying: "Aleksandr’s Price is a gay-themed movie, its depiction of the cruel and shallow world of New York City and its commerce in young men and women of all sexual orientations is spot on".

DVD Beaver said: "If Black Swan were a film about a male escort rather than a ballerina (and had a dash of Requiem for a Dream thrown in), it would probably be something like "Aleksandr's Price" (although a bit more relentless, much more overblown, and without the hint of hopeful optimism).

== Accolades ==
Aleksandr's Price had its Austrian premiere on November 10, 2014, at the "Internationale Queere Migrantische Filmtage" (Eng. International Queer Migrant Filmdays) which is held every year in Vienna. Pau Masó was given an "Appreciation Award" for his outstanding work in Queer film and media.
