= Pau Masó =

Spanish actor, film director, producer, writer and model

- Born: Pau Masó Coromina; 14 January 1986 (age 40); Girona, Catalonia, Spain
- Other name: Paul C. Mason
- Occupations: actor director writer producer model entrepreneur
- Years active: 2010–present
- Height: 5 ft 9 in (1.75 m)
- Website: Official Site

Pau Masó (born 14 January 1986) is a Spanish actor, film director, producer, writer and model. He made his film debut in Aleksandr's Price (2013), which was written, directed, edited and produced by and starred him.

== Film career ==
Masó has acted on a variety of films and shorts including; Keep the Party Going, One Minute, Bloody Night and Who's There?, and he starred in and directed Haunted Poland, which was released on 3 September 2012. Who's There? received good reviews. Masó has three films in post-production: The Art of Losing, Borderline and What Spring Does with the Cherry Trees.

== Aleksandr's Price ==
In the fall of 2011, Masó began writing a script about a male prostitute. In January 2012, production of the film started under the working title Simple Moves, and by March shooting began in the city of New York. According to IMDb, the film was shot in the period of approximately four weeks.

The film's first promotional teaser was released in April 2012, although the film didn't come out until fall 2013. The movie tells the story of an illegal Russian boy in Manhattan who, after losing his mother to suicide, is drawn into becoming a male prostitute. In a recent interview with a gay Russian magazine, the actor was quoted, saying: "To wrap this up, I also want to say that I find it highly insulting that people want to use religion to excuse their hate towards other people, rather they have a different sexual orientation, color, race or religion beliefs. There is just no excuse for that no matter what".

The film's final title in general release was changed from Simple Moves to Aleksandr's Price.

== Borderline ==
In summer 2015, Masó began production of Borderline in La Garrotxa, Catalonia, Spain. Shooting in various locations including Sant Feliu de Pallerols, Salt de Sallent de Rupit and Sant Privat d´en Bas. Borderline is a horror film about two estranged sisters who, on the tenth anniversary of their mother's death, head to a mountain to scatter her ashes while they struggle to reconcile. The film stars Paula Ortiz, Mireia Vallés, Mariangels Punyet and Txema Lorente. The film is set to be released sometime in 2016. A teaser was released on 25 August 2015.

== Filmography ==
=== Films ===
"We are what we make of ourselves, what we think we are worth and most importantly, what we feel capable of achieving."

— Masó, reflecting on his career

Year	Film	Functioned as					Notes
Year	Film	director	Producer	Writer	Actor	Role	Notes
2010	One Minute (short)	Yes	Yes	Yes	Yes	John	
2010	Keep the Party Going				Yes	Luke	
2012	Haunted Poland	Yes	Yes		Yes	Pau	
2013	Aleksandr's Price	Yes	Yes	Yes	Yes	Aleksandr Ivanov	
2013	Bloody Weekend				Yes	Frank	
2015	The Art of Losing	Yes	Yes	Yes	Yes	Víctor Alemán	
2016	What Spring Does with the Cherry Trees				Yes	Pau Masó	
2016	Borderline	Yes	Yes	Yes			
2017	Aleksandr	Yes	Yes	Yes	Yes	Aleksandr Ivanov	
2020	Complete Strangers	Yes		Yes	Yes	Robert	

=== Television ===
Year	Title	Role	Notes
2010	Rizzoli & Isles	Episode: "I Kissed a girl"	
