= Lebanon Community Schools =

School district in Oregon, United States

Lebanon Community Schools, also known as Lebanon Community School District 9, is a public school district serving Lebanon, Oregon, United States, and the surrounding area of Linn County, including the cities of Sodaville and Waterloo and the unincorporated communities of Berlin, Crowfoot, Fairview and Lacomb.

== Demographics ==
In the 2009 school year, the district had 321 students classified as homeless by the Department of Education, which was 7.4% of students in the district.

== High school ==
- Lebanon High School

== Middle schools ==
- Hamilton Creek School (K-8)
- Lacomb School
- Pioneer School (K-8)
- Seven Oak Middle School
- Sand Ridge Charter School
- East linn Christian academy

== Elementary schools ==
- Cascades School
- Green Acres School
- Hamilton Creek School (K-8)
- Pioneer School (K-6)
- Riverview
- east linn Christian academy

== Charter school ==
- Sand Ridge Charter School (K-12)

== See also ==
- Santiam Academy
