= 40th AVN Awards =

US adult industry award ceremony in 2023

- Presented by: MyFreeCams.com
- Date: January 7, 2023
- Site: Resorts World Las Vegas
- Hosted by: Abella Danger, Reya Sunshine & Matt Rife

Highlights
- Best Film: Grinders

The 40th AVN Awards was a pornography awards ceremony recognizing the best actresses, actors, directors and films in the adult industry in 2022. The 40th edition of the ceremony, which began in 1984, encompassed 120 categories involving content creation, production, retail and web/tech forums in the adult industry. The ceremony was held at the Resort World Las Vegas Theatre on January 7, 2023, and streamed on Adult Video News' AVN.com.

== Show overview ==
=== Venue ===
In March 2022, AVN announced that the AVN Expo and related events would be returning to an in-person format at the Resorts World Las Vegas, after using a virtual format the previous two years. Prior to this event, the conference and award show had been most recently held in-person at the Hard Rock Hotel in January 2020.

=== Hosts ===
On September 20, 2022, adult performers Abella Danger and Reya Sunshine were announced as co-hosts for the show. On January 6, 2023, it was announced they would be joined by comedian Matt Rife.

=== Musical performances ===
Recording artists Kehlani and Shenseea performed during the awards show.

== Winners and nominees ==
The nominees for the 40th AVN Awards were announced on November 4, 2022.

The winners were announced during the awards ceremony on January 7, 2023.

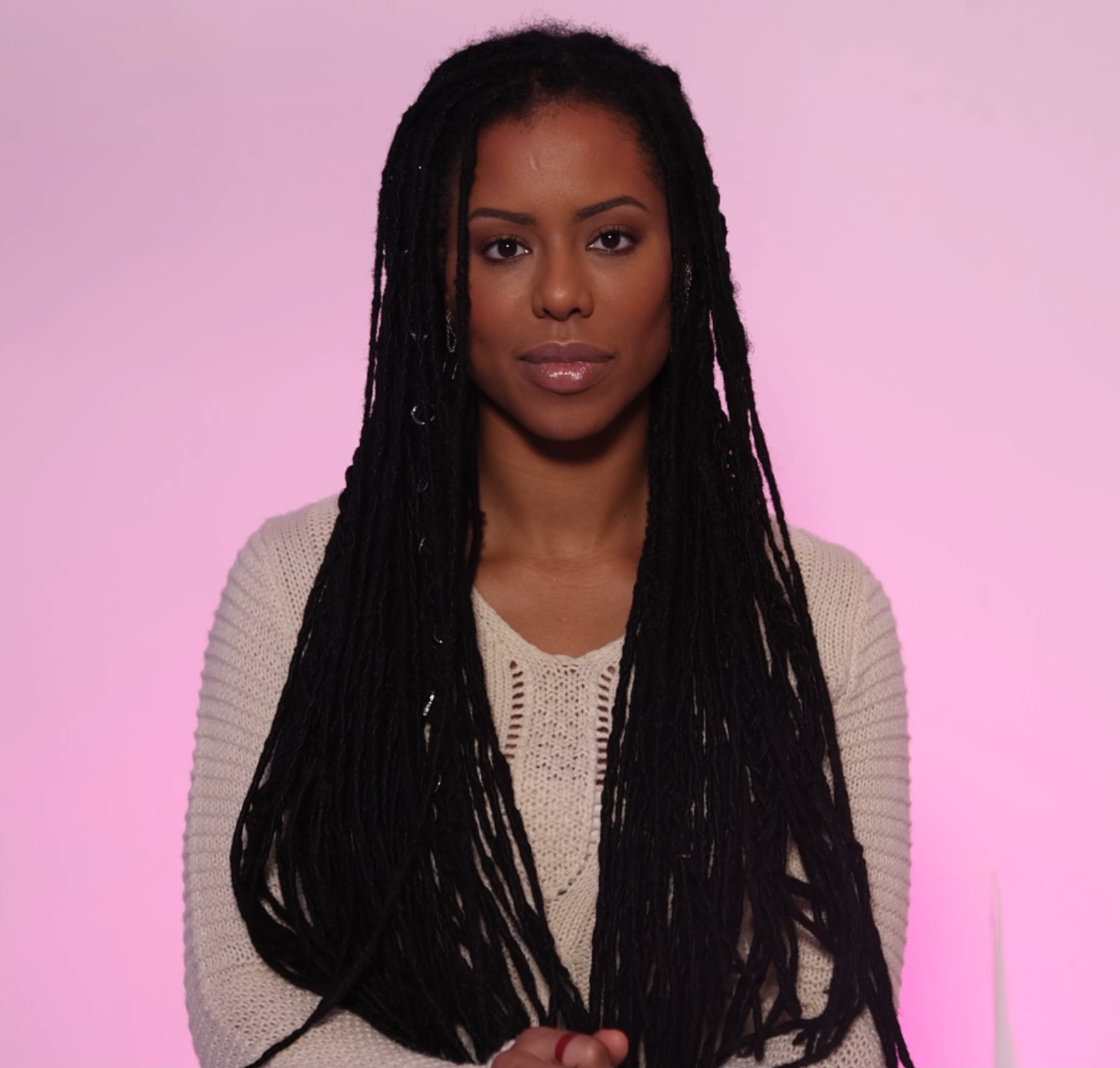
Kira Noir, winner for the 2023 Female Performer of the Year and Best Supporting Actress awards

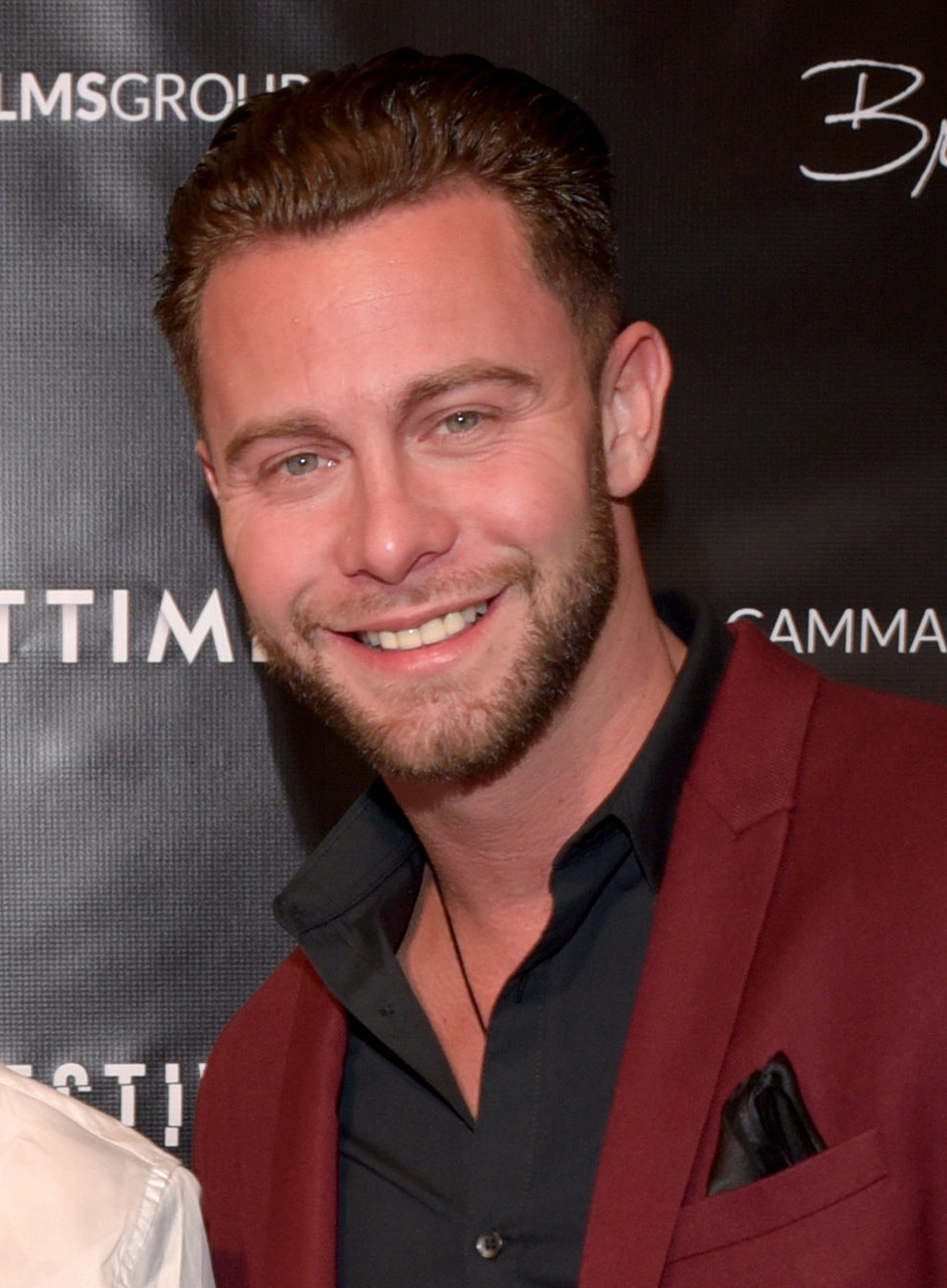
Seth Gamble, winner for the 2023 Male Performer of the Year and Best Actor awards

=== Major awards ===
Winners of these categories are highlighted in boldface.

**Female Performer of the Year**: **Kira Noir**; Aiden Ashley; Vanna Bardot; Lilly Bell; Blake Blossom; Savannah Bond; Anna Claire Clouds; Gianna Dior; Ana Foxxx; Kenna James; Maddy May; April Olsen; Alexis Tae; Angela White; Jane Wilde	**Male Performer of the Year**: **Seth Gamble**; Mick Blue; Nathan Bronson; Dante Colle; Dredd; Manuel Ferrara; Oliver Flynn; Anton Harden; Ricky Johnson; Isiah Maxwell; Ramón Nomar; Tommy Pistol; Codey Steele; Michael Stefano; Zac Wild
**Best Actress**: **Maitland Ward – Drift, Deeper**; Aiden Ashley – Hysteria, Wicked/Pulse; Kenna James – Dark Is the Night, Wicked Noir/Pulse; Freya Parker – Duplicity, Wicked Noir/Pulse; September Reign – Love, Sex & Music, Adam & Eve Pictures; Vanessa Sky – My Best Friend's Girl, Sweet Sinner/Mile High; Charlotte Stokely – Another Night in the Valley, AllHerLuv; Kenzie Taylor – Deranged (Vols. 1 & 2), Wicked/Pulse; Jane Wilde – Stars, Adult Time; Emily Willis – One Night in Los Angeles, Dorcel/Pulse	**Best Actor**: **Seth Gamble – Going Up, Lust Cinema**; Mike Chapman – Introspection, Rocco Siffredi Films/Evil Angel; Dante Colle – One Night in Los Angeles, Dorcel/Pulse; Charles Dera – Duplicity, Wicked Noir/Pulse; Lucky Fate – Grinders, Adult Time; Quinton James – Obsessed 2, Sweet Sinner/Mile High; Isiah Maxwell – I Love You, You're Fired, Lust Cinema; Ryan Mclane – The Hitman: Love is Deadly, Sweet Sinner/Mile High; Tommy Pistol – The Voyeur 5, Sweet Sinner/Mile High; Nicky Rebel – Shoot Your Shot, Team Skeet
**Best Actress - Featurette**: **Blake Blossom – An Honest Man, MissaX**; Aiden Ashley – Off the Record, Forbidden Seductions/Adult Time; Alex Coal – What's So Special About Her?, MissaX; Ana Foxxx – Unfinished Business, Pure Taboo; Jada Kai – Jada, ForPlay Films; Jia Lissa – Third Date, Parasited; Cadence Lux – The Creepening, That Fetish Girl; Victoria Voxxx – Apricity, XConfessions; Jane Wilde – One Last Kiss, MissaX; Maya Woulfe – California Dreaming, Lust Cinema	**Best Actor - Featurette**: **Tommy Pistol – The Bargain, Greenwood/Adult Time**; Chad Alva – Lust Triangles: You'd Get Along Great, Modern-Day Sins; Adam Christopher – Jeffrassic Porn: A Nerds of Porn Theme Park, Nerds of Porn/Creation of Adam; Danny D. – Crooked Throne, Digital Playground; Robby Echo – Heat Wave II, MissaX; Seth Gamble – The Nanny Incident, Pure Taboo; Alex Mack – Unfinished Business, Pure Taboo; Ricky Spanish – Use Your Words, MissaX; Codey Steele – Husband, Unleashed, Pure Taboo; Christian Wilde – Apricity, XConfessions
**Movie of the Year**: **Grinders, Adult Time**; Dark Is the Night, Wicked Noir/Pulse; Deranged (Vols. 1 & 2), Wicked/Pulse; Drift, Deeper; Going Up, Lust Cinema; The Hitman: Love Is Deadly, Sweet Sinner/Mile High; Love, Sex & Music, Adam & Eve Pictures; Maid to Kill, Sparks Entertainment; SpideyPool XXX: An Axel Braun Parody, Wicked Comix; Stars, Adult Time	**Best Featurette**: **The Bargain, Greenwood/Adult Time**; Apricity, XConfessions; California Dreaming, Lust Cinema; Crooked Throne, Digital Playground; Living Well, Pure Taboo; One Last Kiss, MissaX; Pulp Friction, Impulse 2, Deeper/Pulse; S.I., Delphine Films/Model Media US; Third Date, Parasited; Up Uranus, Emorex/Tara-TS
**Best Supporting Actress**: **Kira Noir – Sorrow Bay, Lust Cinema**; Vanna Bardot – Love, Sex & Music, Adam & Eve Pictures; Lilly Bell – Going Up, Lust Cinema; Skye Blue – A Taste of Kunst, Lust Cinema; Anna Claire Clouds – Hysteria, Wicked/Pulse; Ana Foxxx – Torn, Dorcel/Pulse; Brooklyn Gray – Sorrow Bay, Lust Cinema; Charlotte Sins – Grinders, Adult Time; Jennifer White – Deranged (Vols. 1 & 2), Wicked/Pulse; Maya Woulfe – Going Up, Lust Cinema	**Best Supporting Actor**: **Tommy Pistol – Grinders, Adult Time**; Mick Blue, Drift – Deeper; Nathan Bronson – One Night in Los Angeles, Dorcel/Pulse; Dante Colle – Torn, Dorcel/Pulse; Tyler Cruise – SpideyPool XXX: An Axel Braun Parody, Wicked Comix; Robby Echo – Grinders, Adult Time; Peter Green – Shoot Your Shot, Team Skeet; Quinton James – I Love You, You're Fired, Lust Cinema; Ryan Mclane – The Voyeur 5, Sweet Sinner/Mile High; Tyler Nixon – Mommy's Boys, MissaX
**Female Foreign Performer of the Year**: **Little Caprice**; Alexis Crystal; Anna de Ville; Shalina Devine; Eva Elfie; Clea Gaultier; Romy Indy; Eden Ivy; Cherry Kiss; Veronica Leal; Rae Lil Black; Jia Lissa; Clara Mia; Liya Silver; Sybil	**Male Foreign Performer of the Year**: **Danny D.**; Alberto Blanco; Marcello Bravo; Kristof Cale; Christian Clay; Charlie Dean; Darrell Deeps; Chris Diamond; Erik Everhard; Maximo Garcia; Vince Karter; Joss Lescaf; Ricky Mancini; David Perry; Aaron Rock
**Best New Starlet**: **Charly Summer**; Kenzie Anne; Braylin Bailey; Armani Black; Nicole Doshi; Tommy King; Nicole Kitt; Rory Knox; Kay Lovely; Leana Lovings; Bunny Madison; Xxlayna Marie; Madison Summers; Aria Valencia; Slimthick Vic	**Transgender Performer of the Year**: **Emma Rose**; Janie Blade; Erica Cherry; Korra Del Rio; Ariel Demure; Jessy Dubai; Khloe Kay; Kasey Kei; Pixi Lust; Cherry Mavrik; Eva Maxim; Lola Morena; Chrystal Thayer; Jade Venus; Izzy Wilde
**Director of the Year**: **Kayden Kross**; James Avalon; Axel Braun; Casey Calvert; Seth Gamble; Rickey Greenwood; Bree Mills; Mike Quasar; Will Ryder; Jane Wilde; Whitney Wright	**Best Editing**: **Grinders, Adult Time – Michael Hues**; Alien Invaders, Horror Porn – Petr Stovik; The Arcade Machine, Hentaied – Romero & Andrea Rospi; Crooked Throne, Digital Playground – Papa Bitch, Liz Licious & Corey Cobra; Drift, Deeper – Duboko; Goddess and the Seed, Deeper/Pulse – Hans Foley; Maid to Kill, Sparks Entertainment – Harry Sparks; SpideyPool XXX: An Axel Braun Parody, Wicked Comix – Axel Braun & Claudia Ross; Stars, Adult Time – Angelo Poirier; Up Uranus, Emorex/Tara-TS – Tara Emory & L the Robot
**Best Cinematography**: **Goddess and the Seed, Deeper/Pulse – Set Walker**; Dark is the Night, Wicked Noir/Pulse – James Avalon; Grinders, Adult Time – Matt Holder; The Lake House, Blush Erotica – The Sinematographer; Muses, Transfixed – J. Wolf; Revenge, Dorcel/Pulse – Herve Bodilis; Sorrow Bay, Lust Cinema – Bryn Pryor & Shaun Rivera; SpideyPool XXX: An Axel Braun Parody, Wicked Comix – Axel Braun, James Avalon & Ralph Parfait; Stars, Adult Time – Michael Vegas; Within Her (La Femme de ses Reves), Parasite Twins/Canal+ – Cosmo Liveti	**Best Soundtrack**: **Grinders, Adult Time**‡; Drift, Deeper; Duplicity, Wicked Noir/Pulse; Goddess and the Seed, Deeper/Pulse; Going Up, Lust Cinema; I Wanna Fuck Your Mom, Brazzers; Love, Sex & Music, Adam & Eve Pictures; Pussy Party, Imani Seduction Productions; SpideyPool XXX: An Axel Braun Parody, Wicked Comix; Within Her (La Femme de ses Reves, Parasite Twins/Canal+

=== Additional award winners ===
**VIDEO & WEB**

- Best Anal Movie or Limited Series: Anal Savages 8, Jules Jordan Video
- Best Anal Series or Channel: Tushy Raw, Tushy Raw/Pulse
- Best Anal Sex Scene: Angela White & Manuel Ferrara – Florentine Part 1 | If It Feels Good 3, Deeper/Pulse
- Best Anthology Movie or Limited Series: Blonde Label 2, Deeper/Pulse
- Best Anthology Series or Channel: Vibes, Vixen/Pulse
- Best Art Direction: SpideyPool XXX: An Axel Braun Parody, Wicked Comix
- Best BDSM Movie or Limited Series: Tainted Love, Kink
- Best Blowbang Scene: Angela White – Sexually Rated Programming: Blowbang, Brazzers
- Best Boy/Girl Sex Scene: Blake Blossom & Jax Slayher – Dream Slut, Blonde, Stacked, Blake Blossom Worships Jax Slayher's Giant Cock, Jules Jordan Video
- Best Curve Appeal Movie or Limited Series: Breast Worship 7, Jules Jordan Video
- Best Directing – Specialty: Aiden Starr
- Best Directing – International Production: Rocco Siffredi
- Best Directing – Narrative Production: Kayden Kross
- Best Directing – Non-Narrative Production: Jules Jordan
- Best Double-Penetration Sex Scene: Gia Scene 1: Double Penetration, Evil Angel – Gia Derza, John Strong & Mick Blue
- Best Foursome/Orgy Sex Scene: Violet Myers, Vicki Chase, Vanna Bardot, Nicole Doshi, Savannah Bond, Anton Harden, Richard Mann, Isiah Maxwell, Jonathan Jordan, Brickzilla, Garland, Jamie Knoxx, Jay Hefner, John Legendary, Tyrone Love, Stretch & Zaddy – High Gear | Blacked Raw V56, Blacked Raw/Pulse
- Best Gangbang Scene: Take Control, Brazzers – Angela White, Mick Blue, John Strong, Isiah Maxwell, Zac Wild & Oliver Flynn
- Best Girl/Girl Sex Scene: Heat Wave, Slayed – Vanna Bardot & Gianna Dior
- Best Gonzo/Cinemascore Movie or Limited Series: Goddess and the Seed, Deeper/Pulse
- Best Gonzo/Cinemascore Series or Channel: Blacked Raw, Blacked Raw/Pulse
- Best Ingenue Movie or Limited Series: Ripe 11, Jules Jordan Video
- Best Ingenue Series or Channel: Dirty Little Schoolgirl Stories, New Sensations
- Best International Anal Sex Scene: Vina Sky: French Tour De Anal | Exotics 2, Jules Jordan Video – Vina Sky & Vince Carter
- Best International Boy/Girl Sex Scene: The Spanish Stallion: Angie Lynx vs. Liya Silver, Scene 2, Rocco Siffredi Films/Evil Angel – Liya Silver & Joss Lescaf
- Best International Group Sex Scene: Rocco's Double Trouble 5, Scene 2, Rocco Siffredi/Evil Angel – Sara Bell, Martina Smeraldi, Yves Morgan, Oscar Batty & Mike Chapman
- Best International All-Girl Sex Scene: Wonder Women, Caprice Divas/Little Caprice Dreams – Little Caprice & Agatha Vega
- Best International Production: Revenge, Dorcel/Pulse
- Best All-Girl Group Sex Scene: Close Up, Slayed – Gianna Dior, Jill Kassidy & Natalia Nix
- Best All-Girl Movie or Limited Series: Play 2, Slayed/Pulse
- Best All-Girl Series or Channel: Cravings, Slayed/Pulse
- Best Hair & Makeup: One Last Kiss, MissaX; Alexxx Moon
- Best Male Newcomer: Lucky Fate
- Best MILF/Mixed-Age Fantasy Series or Channel: Filthy Moms, Brazzers/Pulse
- Best MILF Movie or Limited Series: Mommy's Boys, MissaX
- Best Female Mixed-Age Fantasy Movie or Limited Series: Cougariffic 2, Girlsway Productions
- Best New International Starlet: Little Dragon
- Best New Production Banner: Ricky's Room
- Best Niche Movie or Limited Series: Cum Inside 3, Nubile Films/Pulse
- Best Niche Series or Channel: Hentai Sex School, Adult Time/Adult Sourcet
- Best Non-Sex Performance: Misty Stone – Love, Sex & Music, Adam & Eve Pictures
- Best Oral Series or Channel: Swallowed.com, Lit Up/Evil Angel
- Best Oral Sex Scene: Laney Grey Deepthroats All Day, Throated/Blowpass – Laney Grey & Mick Blue
- Best POV Sex Scene: Manuel's Fucking POV 14 - Scene 3, Jules Jordan Video – Anna Claire Clouds & Manuel Ferrara

**Content (ctd.)**

- Best Screenplay - Movie or Limited Series: Dark Is the Night, Wicked Noir/Pulse – James Avalon
- Best Screenplay – Featurette: One Last Kiss, MissaX – Ricky Greenwood
- Best Solo/Tease Performance: Take Control, Brazzers – Angela White
- Best Star Showcase: Ultimate Fuck Toy: Charly Summer, Jules Jordan Video
- Best Taboo Relations Movie or Limited Series: Daddy's Favorite 3, Digital Sin
- Best Tag-Team Sex Scene: Gianna 4 You, Dorcel – Gianna Dior, Mick Blue & Steve Holmes
- Best Thespian – Trans/X: Ariel Demure – Under Her Wing, Transfixed
- Best Three-Way Sex Scene: Let's All Be Friends, Blacked Raw – Jazmin Luv, Anna Claire Clouds & Anton Harden
- Best Trans Group Sex Scene: The Cum Sauna, Oopsie!/Adult Time - Emma Rose, Khloe Kay & Kenzie Anne
- Best Trans Movie or Limited Series: Tantalizing Threesomes, TransAngels/Pulse
- Best Trans Newcomer: Brittney Kade
- Best Trans One-on-One Sex Scene: Jade + Ariel: Sealed With a Cum Kiss | PansexualX Porn Crush 4, Aiden Starr/Evil Angel – Jade Venus & Ariel Demure
- Best Trans Series or Channel: Transfixed, Adult Time
- Best Virtual Reality Sex Scene: Dream Team, SLR Originals/SexLikeReal – Apryl Rein, Coco Lovelock, Delilah Day, Haley Spades, Penelope Kay, Charly Summer, Kyler Quinn, Leana Lovings, Blake Blossom, Aubree Valentine, Laney Grey, Madi Laine, Avery Black, Alexia Anders, Izzy Lush & John Strong
- Clever Title of the Year: I Can't Believe It's Nut Butter, WankzVR
- Girl/Girl Specialty Performer of the Year: Aidra Fox
- Mainstream Venture of the Year: Rated X: How Porn Liberated Me From Hollywood – Maitland Ward
- MILF Performer of the Year: Cherie DeVille
- Mark Stone Award for Outstanding Comedy: SpideyPool XXX: An Axel Braun Parody, Wicked Comix
- Most Outrageous Sex Scene: The Bargain, Greenwood/Adult Time - Ashley Lane & Tommy Pistol
- Niche Specialty Performer of the Year: Daisy Ducati

**PLEASURE PRODUCTS**

- Best Enhancement Manufacturer: Wicked Sensual Care
- Best Fetish Manufacturer: XR Brands
- Best Lingerie or Apparel Line: Envy Menswear
- Best Lubricant Brand: o
- Best Pleasure Products Manufacturer – Large: Doc Johnson
- Best Pleasure Products Manufacturer – Medium: Thank Me Now
- Best Pleasure Products Manufacturer – Small: OEJ Novelty

**RETAIL**

- Best Boutique: Pepper
- Best Retail Chain – Large: Lion's Den
- Best Retail Chain – Medium: Excitement
- Best Retail Chain – Small: Circus of Books
- Best Web Retail Store: PinkCherry.com

**FAN-VOTED AVN AWARD WINNERS**

- Favorite Female Porn Star: Angela White
- Most Spectacular Boobs: Angela White
- Most Amazing Ass: Abella Danger
- Hottest MILF: Kendra Lust
- Favorite Creator Site Star: Amouranth
- Favorite Podcast: Plug Talk
- Hottest Newcomer: Scarlett Jones
- Favorite Camming Cosplayer: Purple Bitch
- Favorite Camming Couple: Casey Kisses & Kylie Le Beau
- Favorite Domme: Brittany Andrews
- Favorite Trans Porn Star: Daisy Taylor
- Favorite Male Porn Star: Johnny Sins
- Favorite Cam Girl: Aphia DeMieux
- Favorite BBW Star: Alex Blair
- Favorite Trans Cam Star: Casey Kisses
- Favorite Cam Guy: Logan Chase
