= 1901–02 Oregon Agricultural Aggies men's basketball team =

American college basketball season

Standing (L-R): Theodore Garrow, "Ham" Bilyeu, Will Scott, Patterson. Seated: Carl Rinehart, Skeeter Swann, "Rat" Rinehart.

The 1901-02 Oregon Agricultural College men's basketball team was the first in the history of the school, known today as Oregon State University. The team sport was organized by W.O. "Dad" Trine, who was also the school's track coach.

The nickname of OAC teams in this era was the "Aggies," with today's team name, the "Beavers" first adopted during the decade of the 1920s. The team was independent, scheduling games on an ad hoc basis rather than as part of a formal sports conference.

== Team history ==
=== Background ===
Basketball was invented in December 1891 by physical education teacher James Naismith, and rapidly achieved popularity as an indoor sport for the winter season. The sport came to Oregon, being declared "all the rage" as a training sport for football participants in January 1893, with the Salem YMCA forced to add additional classes to meet surging demand.

A women's basketball team was established at OAC during the academic year of 1897-98, with one game played in the spring of 1898 by the school squad in response to a challenge offered by the team of the Chemawa Indian Institute of Salem. The match, played April 29 in Salem at the Willamette University gym, was won by OAC by a score of 13 to 11. The OAC team included Inez Fuller, Fanny Getty, Dora Hodgin, Blanche Holden, Bessie Smith, and Leona "Nonie" Smith.

The OAC women's basketball team was more formally organized by the 1899-1900 academic year, with Bessie Smith elected team president as well selecting a full slate of officers, including a vice-president, secretary, and treasurer. Scheduling was handled by the team manager, J.H. Gallagher.

A news item in the Corvallis Gazette of January 8, 1901 mentions the name of former OAC student Fred W. Smith as "the father of basketball at that institution." It is unclear whether he was related to Bessie Smith of the OAC women's team. Smith (OAC Class of 1900) was tapped as the coach of the OAC women's team in October 1899.

=== Formal organization ===
While the 1901–02 team was OAC's first school-sanctioned men's club, the sport was played competitively on campus with an admission fee charged during previous academic years. A game between students took place in the school's armory on January 26, 1901 following a baseball game between commissioned and non-commissioned military officers. Played before a substantial audience, the exhibition basketball game was won by a team calling itself the "White Roses" by a score of 4 to 0.

Collegiate football came to Corvallis, Oregon in the fall of 1893, when the Oregon Agricultural College Aggies fielded their first squad. In 1901–02, track coach W.O. "Dad" Trine formally established the school's first men's basketball squad.

The OAC basketball team was independent during the 1901–02 academic year, scheduling its games on an ad hoc basis rather than as part of a formal sports conference.

== Personnel ==
The 1901-02 OAC Aggies team included the following members:

- Thomas "Ham" Bilyeu
- Theodore Garrow
- Patterson
- J. Carle Rinehart
- Harvey "Rat" Rinehart
- Will Scott
- Claud "Skeeter" Swann

== Game results (partial list) ==
- Feb. 7, 1902: @Willamette University 62, OAC 11
- March 3, 1902: @OAC 14, Willamette University 11
