= John Bates (American football) =

American football player (born 1997)

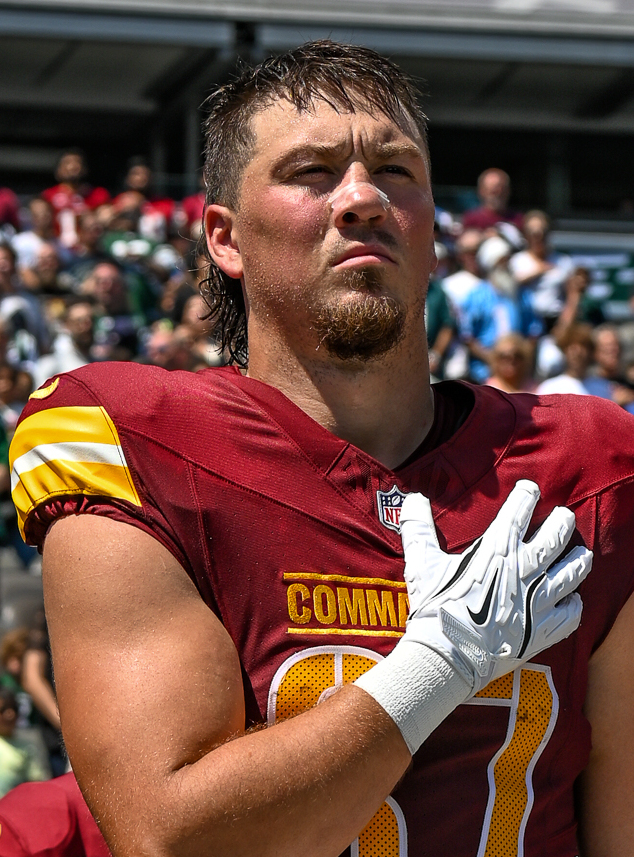
- Bates with the Washington Commanders in 2024

No. 87 – Washington Commanders
- Position: Tight end
- Roster status: Active

Personal information
- Born: November 6, 1997 (age 28); Nyssa, Oregon, U.S.
- Listed height: 6 ft 6 in (1.98 m)
- Listed weight: 256 lb (116 kg)

Career information
- High school: Lebanon (Lebanon, Oregon)
- College: Boise State (2016–2020)
- NFL draft: 2021: 4th round, 124th overall pick

Career history
- Washington Football Team / Commanders (2021–present)

Career NFL statistics as of 2025
- Receptions: 72
- Receiving yards: 695
- Receiving touchdowns: 3
- Stats at Pro Football Reference

John Bates (born November 6, 1997) is an American professional football tight end for the Washington Commanders of the National Football League (NFL). He played college football for the Boise State Broncos and was selected by Washington in the fourth round of the 2021 NFL draft.

Throughout his career, Bates has been referred to as one of the best blocking tight ends in the NFL.

== Professional career ==
Pre-draft measurables
| Height | Weight | Arm length | Hand span | Wingspan | 40-yard dash | 10-yard split | 20-yard split | 20-yard shuttle | Three-cone drill | Vertical jump | Broad jump | Bench press |
|---|---|---|---|---|---|---|---|---|---|---|---|---|
| 6 ft 5 3/8 in (1.97 m) | 250 lb (113 kg) | 32 1/4 in (0.82 m) | 9 3/8 in (0.24 m) | 6 ft 6 1/4 in (1.99 m) | 4.82 s | 1.71 s | 2.83 s | 4.35 s | 6.85 s | 31.5 in (0.80 m) | 10 ft 0 in (3.05 m) | 19 reps |
All values from Pro Day

Bates was drafted by the Washington Football Team in the fourth round (124th overall) of the 2021 NFL draft. He signed his four-year rookie contract on May 13, 2021. Due to injuries to Logan Thomas and Ricky Seals-Jones, Bates had his first career start in the Week 11 win over the Carolina Panthers. In a December 26, 2021, game against the Dallas Cowboys, Bates scored his first NFL touchdown which he fumbled but later recovered in the endzone. Bates finished the 2021 season as Pro Football Focus's highest graded tight end in run blocking.

After his rookie deal deal expired, Bates signed a three-year, $21,000,000 contract extension with the Commanders on March 11, 2025. In the Week 18 victory over the Philadelphia Eagles, he scored his third career touchdown from a two-yard pass from quarterback Josh Johnson. Bates finished the 2025 season with 11 receptions, 106 yards, and a touchdown.

Bates began the 2026 season listed as one of the Commanders' starting tight ends alongside former Tennessee Titans tight end Chigoziem Okonkwo, who had signed with the Commanders as a free agent during the 2026 offseason.

== NFL career statistics ==
Legend
| **Bold** | Career high |

=== Regular season ===
| Year | Team | Games | | Receiving | | | | | | Tackles | | | Fumbles | | |
| Year | Team | GP | GS | Tgt | Rec | Yds | Avg | Lng | TD | Cmb | Solo | Ast | FR | Fum | Lost |
|---|---|---|---|---|---|---|---|---|---|---|---|---|---|---|---|
| 2021 | WAS | 17 | 8 | 25 | **20** | **249** | **12.5** | 32 | **1** | **2** | **2** | 0 | **1** | **1** | 0 |
| 2022 | WAS | 16 | 7 | 22 | 14 | 108 | 7.7 | 20 | **1** | 0 | 0 | 0 | **1** | **1** | 0 |
| 2023 | WAS | 17 | 4 | **28** | 19 | 151 | 7.9 | **35** | 0 | **2** | **2** | 0 | 0 | 0 | 0 |
| 2024 | WAS | 17 | 6 | 13 | 8 | 84 | 10.5 | 20 | 0 | **2** | 1 | **1** | 0 | **1** | **1** |
| 2025 | WAS | 15 | 11 | 16 | 11 | 103 | 9.4 | 22 | **1** | 0 | 0 | 0 | **1** | 0 | 0 |
| Career | | 82 | 36 | 104 | 72 | 695 | 9.7 | 35 | 3 | 6 | 5 | 1 | 3 | 3 | 1 |

=== Postseason ===
| Year | Team | Games | | Receiving | | | | | | Tackles | | | Fumbles | | |
| Year | Team | GP | GS | Tgt | Rec | Yds | Avg | Lng | TD | Cmb | Solo | Ast | FR | Fum | Lost |
|---|---|---|---|---|---|---|---|---|---|---|---|---|---|---|---|
| 2024 | WAS | 3 | 3 | 5 | 3 | 31 | 10.3 | 20 | 0 | 0 | 0 | 0 | 0 | 0 | 0 |
| Career | | 3 | 3 | 5 | 3 | 31 | 10.3 | 20 | 0 | 0 | 0 | 0 | 0 | 0 | 0 |
