= Berlin, Oregon =

Geography, place in Oregon

- Unincorporated community
- Location within Oregon Location within the United States
- Coordinates: 44°29′52″N 122°42′52″W
- Country: United States
- State: Oregon
- County: Linn
- Elevation: 479 ft (146 m)

Population (1944)
  - Total: >65
- Time zone: UTC-8 (Pacific (PST))
  - Summer (DST): UTC-7 (PDT)
- Postal code: 97355
- Area code: 541
- GNIS feature ID: 1134941

Berlin is an unincorporated community in Linn County, Oregon, United States.

== History ==
Originally, the community was developed around a horse racing course operated by the Burrell family. The races became so popular that the family began charging visitors for meals and their home became known as Burrell’s Inn. When a local post office was established in 1899, it was called Berlin (a single word version of Burrell Inn). The Berlin post office was closed in 1937.

== Geography ==
Waterloo is to the west; Sweet Home is to the south. Berlin is approximately 10 miles (16 km) east of Lebanon and 70 miles (110 km) north-east of Eugene.

Berlin has a creek, the Hamilton Creek.

Berlin is a located in Linn County at latitude 44.498 and longitude -122.748.

Climate data for Berlin, Oregon
Month	Jan	Feb	Mar	Apr	May	Jun	Jul	Aug	Sep	Oct	Nov	Dec	Year
Mean daily maximum °F (°C)	48 (9)	52 (11)	56 (13)	61 (16)	67 (19)	73 (23)	81 (27)	82 (28)	76 (24)	65 (18)	53 (12)	47 (8)	63 (17)
Mean daily minimum °F (°C)	34 (1)	35 (2)	37 (3)	39 (4)	44 (7)	48 (9)	51 (11)	50 (10)	46 (8)	42 (6)	38 (3)	34 (1)	42 (5)
Average precipitation inches (mm)	7.0 (180)	5.9 (150)	6.1 (150)	4.8 (120)	3.7 (94)	2.5 (64)	0.7 (18)	0.9 (23)	2.0 (51)	4.3 (110)	8.0 (200)	8.2 (210)	54.1 (1,370)
Average precipitation days	16	14	16	14	10	7	2	2	5	10	16	17	129
Source: NOAA
