= 1904–05 Oregon Agricultural Aggies women's basketball team =

American college basketball season

The starting five of the 1904-05 OAC women's basketball team. Team captain was Mertie Harrington, who is likely holding the ball.

The 1904–05 Oregon Agricultural Aggies women's basketball team represented Oregon Agricultural College (OAC, today's Oregon State University) during the 1904–05 academic year. It was the seventh academic year in which an organized women's team played games on behalf of OAC.

The team was independent of any organized athletic conference and scheduled its games on an ad hoc basis. The team played a game in January 1905 reckoned by one local newspaper to be the largest crowd to ever see a basketball game in the history of OAC.

Based upon newspaper accounts, the 1904–05 OAC team ended with a record of 6 wins and 2 losses, losing to neighboring Albany College in a state championship game held in Portland in March.

== Team history ==
=== December 1904 ===
In December 1904, the OAC women's basketball team traveled to Southern Oregon to play a back-to-back pair of games. On Friday, December 16, the team played in Cottage Grove, where they won by a score of 13 to 7. The following night the team took the floor against a badly overmatched Roseburg team, whom they drubbed by the lopsided score of 42–5.

=== January 1905 ===
On Friday, January 20, 1905, the Aggies faced off against the Lebanon High School girls team in front of a large crowd at the OAC Armory. A local news account noted that this event marked the first appearance of the OAC women's squad in the armory in two years, which generated a higher-than-anticipated level of interest. OAC dominated the contest, taking a 12–2 lead into halftime en route to a 25–5 victory. About 400 fans were in attendance to the see the victory over the Lebanon girls — a crowd reckoned by the local press as "probably the largest that ever attended a basket ball game at the college."

=== February 1905 ===
On February 11, the OAC women defeated a girls' team from the Chemawa Indian School, a boarding high school for Native American students located in Salem. Once again a "large crowd" was in attendance at the OAC Armory to see the Aggies take down the visitors by a score of 16 to 6. Students from neighboring Albany were in attendance and two home-and-home games were hastily organized between the Albany women and OAC.

The first game of the home-and-home battle against Albany College, known today as Lewis & Clark College, took place at OAC Armory on Thursday, February 16. Fully 100 people made the trip from Albany to see the contest, with a sizeable Corvallis contingent also turning out to make the crowd "a good one." The Aggies women won by the narrow score of 4 to 3. One local newspaper remarked for its readers that "the teams were so evenly matched that scoring was impossible. This fact made it certain from the opening of play that a bit of good luck might throw the result either way, and every movement of the ball was watched with almost breathless interest."

The OAC armory and gymnasium, shown here in 1902, was the home venue for the Aggies women's basketball team.

The game opened with Albany making a free throw on a foul to open up a 1–0 lead, in what would prove to be Albany's only lead of the night. OAC answered a minute or two later making a foul shot of their own to tie the score. "Then for a while the ball surged back and forth from one goal to the other, with honors fairly even" until OAC captain Mertie Harrington made a basket from the field, enabling OAC to take a 3 to 1 halftime lead. Albany guard Gertrude Bussard hit a shot to tie the score in the second half — and "the interest, which had all along been at high pitch, now assumed a tension seldom seen," a commentator remarked. A late foul shot was rolled in by OAC, sealing the narrow 4–3 victory.

A game against Willamette University was scheduled for the OAC Armory on the following night, Friday, February 17. The contest was won by the OAC women by a score of 9 to 5, with the Aggies' scoring powered by three field goals by center Una Stewart and a bucket by forward Edna Smith. The night was shared with the OAC men's team, who demolished their Willamette counterparts by a score of 22 to 3. "The crowd in attendance was the largest of the season, which by the way has been a season of unprecedented basket ball crowds. The receipts of Friday nights game was above $125," one local newspaper approvingly noted.

A special train leaving Corvallis at 6:30 pm was arranged for local fans interested in making the trip to neighboring Albany for the rematch against Albany College on Saturday night, February 25. Two of the OAC regulars were ill and their places filled by substitutes. In the game at the Albany Armory, played before a packed house, the home team took a 10–5 lead to halftime, en route to an 18–13 victory over OAC. A third and deciding game between the two top teams in the state was planned to be held on a neutral court in Portland. The winner of the "rubber" was to be proclaimed as Oregon state women's basketball champions.

=== March 1905 ===
After a bit of wrangling between the two sides, the Portland YMCA was chosen as the neutral site and March 10 as the date for the deciding third game between Albany College and Oregon Agricultural College in what was reckoned as the Oregon state championship of women's basketball. A pair of neutral officials were decided upon by the respective managers of the teams, neither of which would have a personal interest in the outcome.

The game began at 6:00 pm. A large crowd was in attendance, including a number of former residents of Albany.

The orange-and-black took a 9 to 5 lead to halftime, but in the second half Albany College star guard Gertie Bussard got hot and pulled out the victory, with Albany outscoring OAC 15 to 5 in the period en route to a 20–14 victory. Bussard was clearly the player of the game, finishing with three field goals and six makes from the free throw line, accounting for more than half of Albany's scoring in the winning effort.

== Roster ==
According to the local press the following were members of the 1904–05 OAC women's team:

=== Starters ===
- Mertie Harrington (forward — captain)
- Edna Smith (forward)
- Una Stewart (center)
- Francis Gellatly (guard)
- Agnes Sweek (guard)

=== Reserves ===
- Luella Van Cleve
- Elma Edwards

== Schedule and results ==
| Date time, TV | Rank^{#} | Opponent^{#} | Result | Record | Site city, state |
1904–05 Season
| December 16, 1904 | | Cottage Grove | W 13–7 | 1-0 | Cottage Grove, Oregon |
| December 18, 1904 | | Roseburg High School | W 42–5 | 2–0 | Roseburg, Oregon |
| January 20, 1905 | | Lebanon High School | W 25–5 | 3–0 | OAC Armory; Corvallis, Oregon |
| February 11, 1905 | | Chemawa Indian School | W 16–6 | 4–0 | OAC Armory; Corvallis, Oregon |
| February 16, 1905 | | Albany College | W 4–3 | 5–0 | OAC Armory; Corvallis, OR |
| February 17, 1905 | | Willamette University | W 9–5 | 6–0 | OAC Armory; Corvallis, Oregon |
| February 25, 1905 | | Albany College | L 13–18 | 6–1 | Albany, Oregon |
| March 10, 1905 | | Albany College | L 14–20 | 6–2 | Portland YMCA; Portland, Oregon |
*Non-conference game. ^{#}Rankings from AP Poll. (#) Tournament seedings in parentheses.
