= Central Linn High School =

Location
- 32433 Highway 228; Halsey, Oregon 97348; United States
- Coordinates: 44.390621°N 123.087451°W

Information
- Type: Public
- School district: Central Linn School District
- Principal: Dean Rech
- Teaching staff: 20.00 (FTE)
- Grades: 7-12
- Enrollment: 135 (2023-24)
- Student to teacher ratio: 15.80
- Colors: Blue, scarlet red, and white
- Athletics conference: OSAA Tri-River Conference 2A-3
- Mascot: Cobra
- Rival: East Linn Christian Academy
- Website: http://centrallinn.k12.or.us/

Central Linn High School is a public high school in Halsey, Oregon, United States.

== Academics ==
In 2008, 75% of the school's seniors received a high school diploma. Of 56 students, 42 graduated, eight dropped out, three received a modified diploma, and three were still in high school the following year.

== Sports ==
In the 2009–2010 season, the boys' basketball team made it to the state tournament and took second place to Portland Christian. In the following season, they returned to the same tournament and took second once again, this time to Western Mennonite, whom they had previously beaten twice in league play. In the 2010–2011 season, Zachary Holloway set a record for points scored by a single player in the tournament with 36 points.

The high school boys' track team has won twelve 1A/2A state championships (1967, 1969, 1970, 1971, 1978, 1983, 1987, 2011, 2012, 2013, 2014, and 2015).

The girls basketball team has been to the state playoffs 3 consecutive years (2017/18, 18/19, and 19/20), finishing 4th in 18/19 and 6th in 19/20.
