= Paul McQuistan =

American football player (born 1983)

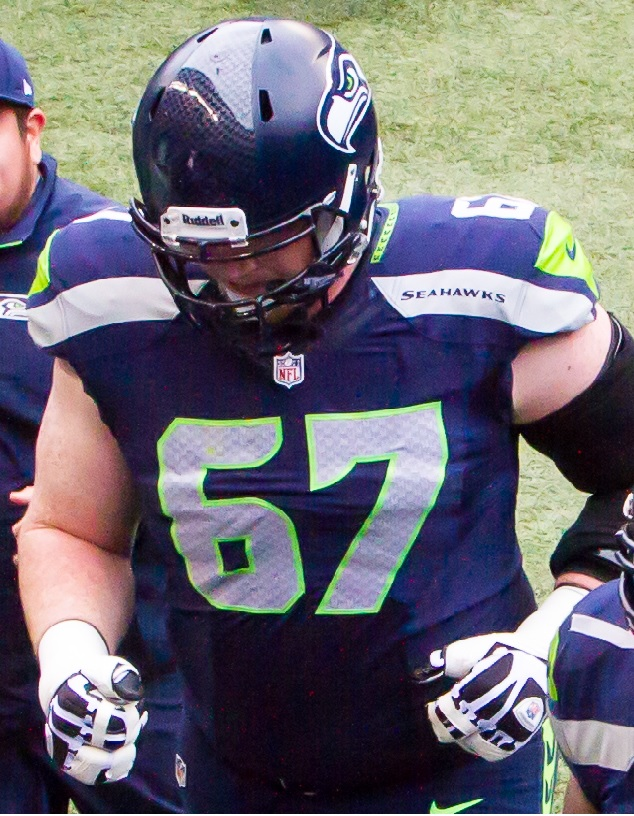
- McQuistan with the Seattle Seahawks in 2013

No. 67, 74, 79
- Position: Offensive guard

Personal information
- Born: April 30, 1983 (age 43); San Diego, California, U.S.
- Listed height: 6 ft 6 in (1.98 m)
- Listed weight: 315 lb (143 kg)

Career information
- High school: Lebanon (Lebanon, Oregon)
- College: Weber State (2001–2005)
- NFL draft: 2006: 3rd round, 69th overall pick

Career history
- Oakland Raiders (2006–2009); Jacksonville Jaguars (2009); Cleveland Browns (2010); Seattle Seahawks (2011–2013); Cleveland Browns (2014)

Awards and highlights
- Super Bowl champion (XLVIII)

Career NFL statistics
- Games played: 83
- Games started: 52
- Fumble recoveries: 1
- Stats at Pro Football Reference

Paul McQuistan (born April 30, 1983) is an American former professional football player who was an offensive guard in the National Football League (NFL). He was selected by the Oakland Raiders in the third round of the 2006 NFL draft. He played college football at Weber State.

McQuistan was also a member of the Jacksonville Jaguars, Cleveland Browns, and Seattle Seahawks.

== Early life ==
McQuistan attended Lebanon High School in Lebanon, Oregon, where he was a letterman in football. He was named as a second team All-Valley League selection at guard and was an All-Valley League Honorable Mention selection as a defensive tackle

== College career ==
He played college football at Weber State University in Utah, and was selected in the third round (69th overall) by the Raiders in the 2006 NFL draft. His twin brother, Pat McQuistan also played at Weber State and was selected in the seventh round (211th overall) by the Dallas Cowboys.

== Professional career ==
Pre-draft measurables
Height	Weight	Arm length	Hand span	40-yard dash	10-yard split	20-yard split	20-yard shuttle	Three-cone drill	Vertical jump	Broad jump	Bench press
6 ft 6 1/8 in (1.98 m)	312 lb (142 kg)	33 1/4 in (0.84 m)	9 3/4 in (0.25 m)	5.10 s	1.73 s	2.91 s	4.62 s	7.72 s	29.5 in (0.75 m)	9 ft 2 in (2.79 m)	28 reps
All values from NFL Combine

=== Oakland Raiders ===
McQuistan was named the starting right guard for the Oakland Raiders prior to the 2006 NFL season. After starting the first six games, he was benched for the remaining 10 games. In 2007, McQuistan moved over to right tackle, playing all 16 games and started six of them. He only played one game in 2008 before suffering an injury and being placed on injured reserve, thus ending his season. McQuistan was released on November 9, 2009.

=== Jacksonville Jaguars ===
He was signed by the Jacksonville Jaguars on November 21, 2009. On September 5, 2010, he was released by the Jaguars.

=== Cleveland Browns (first stint) ===
McQuistan signed with the Cleveland Browns on October 20, 2010. He was waived on November 13, 2010.

=== Seattle Seahawks ===
McQuistan signed with the Seattle Seahawks on January 28, 2011. McQuistan won his first Super Bowl with the Seahawks, when they defeated the Broncos, 43–8.

=== Cleveland Browns (second stint) ===
On March 24, 2014, he signed a two-year deal with the Browns. He was released on February 13, 2015.
