= Rae Lil Black =

Japanese influencer (born 1996)

Nuray Istiqbal
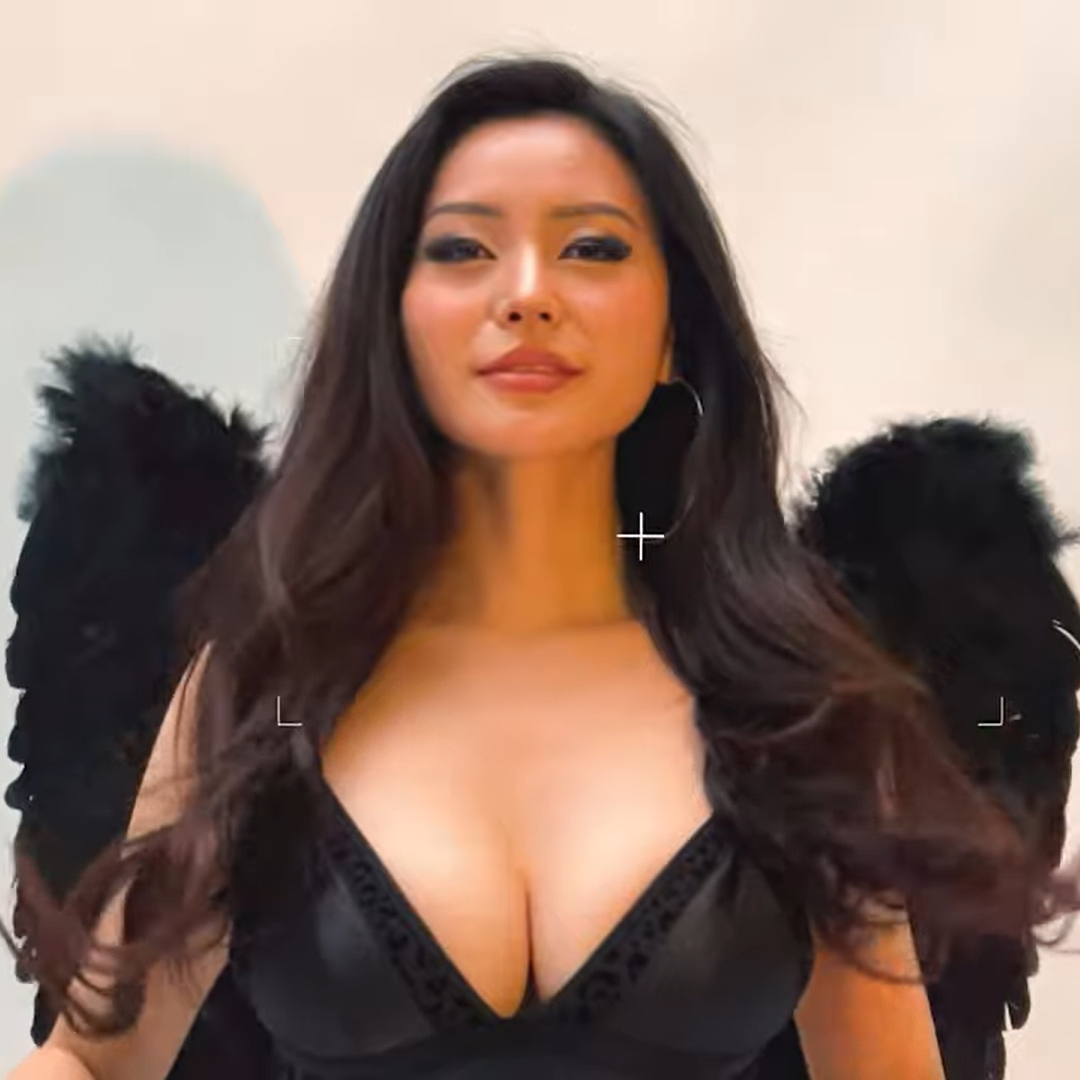
- Rae Lil Black in 2021
- Born: August 17, 1996 (age 30); Osaka, Japan
- Other names: Rae Lil Black; Raewadee
- Occupation: Influencer

YouTube information
- Channel: Nuray Istiqbal (Rae Lil Black) Official Channel
- Years active: 2018–2025
- Genres: ASMR; mukbang; travel; vlog
- Subscribers: 332K
- Views: 10.6 million
- Last updated: March 31, 2026

Nuray Istiqbal (born either Kae Asakura or Akiko Matsuzawa; (Note: Some sources cite her birth name as Kae Asakura (朝倉加江), while others cite it as Akiko Matsuzawa (松沢明子).) August 17, 1996), better known by her former stage name Rae Lil Black, is a Japanese former pornographic actress, currently working as an influencer and content creator. She shares vlogs on platforms such as YouTube, TikTok, and Instagram. Following a visit to Malaysia in 2024, she converted to Islam and changed her name.

== Early life ==
Istiqbal was born either Kae Asakura or Akiko Matsuzawa in Osaka on August 17, 1996.

== Career ==
Istiqbal entered the adult film industry under the stage name Lil Rae Black at the age of 20. Her first hardcore video was released in 2018, amassing millions of views in its first week on Pornhub. She earned two award nominations at the 2019 Pornhub Awards, and received further nominations throughout her adult film career at the XBIZ Awards and AVN Awards. In 2020, AVN noted her as being ranked in the top 30 most popular models on Pornhub, moving up to 18th place in 2022. She was featured as a playable character in Heavy Metal Babes, a 2020 turn-based role-playing game published by Nutaku. She starred in eight films by Vixen Media Group from 2020 to 2024. She was noted for her scarcity as a performer, appearing in under 60 scenes from 2017 to 2022, and became even more selective in her bookings over time. In addition to her professional scenes, she opened a personal OnlyFans account. She also found work as a non-pornographic model, appearing on the cover of the 25th issue of the sex magazine Richardson.

After stepping away from adult films, she transitioned into content creation and built a following on platforms like YouTube, TikTok, Instagram, and Twitch, where she streams gaming sessions and shares personal vlogs. Her YouTube vlogs are centered around topics such as food and travel. She also created ASMR and mukbang content. In November 2023, she gave a TEDx Talk in Bangkok. In February 2025, she participated in a meet-and-greet at Sneaker Con Southeast Asia, a sneakerhead event held at the Marina Bay Sands Expo in Singapore. Though she would not publicly announce her conversion to Islam until the following month, she was given prayer mats and travel prayer kits at the event.

After removing all adult content from her social media accounts and publicly announcing her conversion, Istiqbal was noted by the Toronto Sun as having lost followers on her platforms.

== Personal life ==
Following a stay in Thailand in 2023, Istiqbal adopted the Thai nickname Raewadee.

In October 2024, Istiqbal posted TikTok videos of herself wearing a hijab and dressing modestly. In March 2025, she publicly announced her conversion to Islam following a visit to Malaysia the previous year; she was reportedly deeply influenced by the culture and religious environment, particularly in Kuala Lumpur, and adopted the Muslim name Nuray Istiqbal. Her conversion garnered a mixed reaction, with both outrage and some support from Muslim communities, as well as skepticism from some fans.

Since her conversion, Istiqbal has expressed interest in learning more about Islamic practices and has occasionally shared aspects of her journey on social media. In interviews, she has emphasized her commitment to distancing herself from her porn career.

== Award nominations ==
Year	Ceremony	Category	Result	Ref.
2019	2nd Pornhub Awards	Most Popular Verified Professional Model	Nominated	
2019	2nd Pornhub Awards	Top Blowjob Performer	Nominated	
2020	XBIZ Awards	Female Clip Artist of the Year	Nominated	
2020	XBIZ Cam Awards	Best Female Clip Artist	Nominated	
2020	3rd Pornhub Awards	Blowjob Queen: Top Blowjob Performer	Nominated	
2021	38th AVN Awards	Best New Foreign Starlet	Nominated	
2021	GayVN Awards	Best Bi Sex Scene	Nominated	
2022	4th Pornhub Awards	Top Blowjob Performer	Nominated	
2023	40th AVN Awards	Best International Male/Female Sex Scene	Nominated	
2023	40th AVN Awards	International Female Performer of the Year	Nominated	
2023	40th AVN Awards	Most Outrageous Sex Scene	Nominated	
2024	41st AVN Awards	Best International All-Girl Sex Scene	Nominated	
2024	41st AVN Awards	Best International Boy/Girl Sex Scene	Nominated	

== See also ==
- List of converts to Islam
