= Eric Castle =

American football player (born 1970)

No. 44
- Position: Defensive back

Personal information
- Born: March 15, 1970 (age 56); Longview, Washington, U.S.
- Listed height: 6 ft 3 in (1.91 m)
- Listed weight: 212 lb (96 kg)

Career information
- High school: Lebanon (Lebanon, Oregon)
- College: Oregon
- NFL draft: 1993: 6th round, 161st overall pick

Career history
- San Diego Chargers (1993–1996); Arizona Cardinals (1997)*
- * Offseason or practice squad member only

Awards and highlights
- Third-team All-American (1991); 2× First-team All-Pac-10 (1991, 1992); Second-team All-Pac-10 (1990)

Career NFL statistics
- Tackles: 23
- Stats at Pro Football Reference

Eric Castle (born March 15, 1970) is an American former professional football player who was a defensive back for four seasons for the San Diego Chargers of the National Football League (NFL). He was selected by the San Diego Chargers in the 6th round (161st overall) of the 1993 NFL Draft. He played college football for the Oregon Ducks. Castle currently coaches elementary and middle school track and field at St. Clare School in Portland, Oregon.
