= Xxlayna Marie =

American pornographic film actress (born 1999/2000)

- Born: 1999 or 2000 (age 25–26); Lebanon, Oregon, U.S.
- Occupation: Pornographic actress
- Years active: 2021–present

Xxlayna Marie (born 1999 or 2000) is an American pornographic film actress.

Marie was raised in Lebanon, Oregon with Latin American and Cherokee roots.

== Early life ==
Originally from Oregon, Marie originally worked at a KFC as a teenager, making US$11 an hour. Marie stated that at this time she dealt with alcohol issues and an eviction.

== Career ==
Marie began her career in April 2021, filming with companies such as Bang Bros and HussiePass. In November 2023, it was stated she was earning US$1,000 a day from modeling contracts.

In April 2023, she appeared in a shoot for Ricky's Room.

== Awards ==
Marie was selected as Cherry Pimps' Cherry of the Month for March 2022. She was also named NubilePorn.com's Flavor of the Month for November 2022, for which she starred in a scene with Ricky Spanish.

She was selected as the Trophy Girl for the 40th AVN Awards, in which she was nominated for Best New Starlet, ultimately losing out to Charly Summer.

She won the AVN Award for Best Tag-Team Sex Scene in 2026.

== Personal life ==
As of March 2024, Marie lived in Las Vegas, Nevada.
