= East Linn Christian Academy =

- Front of East Linn Christian Academy

Location
- 36883 Victory Drive; Lebanon, Linn County, Oregon 97355; United States; 44.503419°N 122.921927°W

Information
- Type: Private Pre-School, Elementary School, Middle School, & High School
- Opened: 1982
- Administrator: Janelle Detweiler (Superintendent)
- Principal: Kim Bates (Elementary), Jon Bartlow (Middle/High)
- Grades: PK-12
- Enrollment: 385
- Colors: Navy, White, and Columbia Blue
- Athletics conference: OSAA Central Valley Conference 2A-3
- Mascot: Eagle
- Rival: Central Linn High School
- Accreditation: ACSI, AdvancED,
- Affiliation: Christian
- Website: www.eastlinnchristian.org

East Linn Christian Academy is a private PK through 12th Grade Christian school in Lebanon, Oregon, United States, serving the families in Lebanon, Sweet Home, Albany, Corvallis, Linn County and the Willamette Valley.

== History and school development ==
East Linn Christian Academy was founded by Harold and Dorothy Grove in 1982. "Value People", "Steward with Integrity" and "Transformational Education" is the schools core values used to shape the schools program and teaching styles. The school originally was at two different locations in Lebanon and Sweet Home. In 2011, the school combined all the grades to one campus in Lebanon Oregon. Since then, the school has increased the number of classes and buildings as needed for the growth of the school. In 2017, the school started fundraising for a new cafeteria and additional classrooms. They hope to begin construction by 2019.

== Academics ==
East Linn Christian Academy (ELC) has been accredited by the Association of Christian Schools International since 1982, and by the AdvancEd since 1996. The school meets the requirements for graduation of the Oregon State Department of Education.

The Academic program schedule follows a traditional, five day a week, 8 period schedule. Consisting of four days of traditional class periods and one day with shorter periods to accommodate for a chapel service (Wednesday mornings). College credit opportunities exist for high school students to earn college credit at institutions of higher education, including Oregon Institute of Technology. ELC has a growing number of concurrent enrollment courses taught on site, including writing, math, anatomy, physiology and business courses. A strong academic support program aids over 25% of our students, STEM and other advanced courses are offered to challenge the top tier students.

== International studies ==
The international student program is open to 6th through 12th grade. ELC has the privilege of serving students from the Philippines, China, Korea, Germany, Hong Kong and Japan. Their vision is to embrace Acts 1:8, Matthew 28:19 and Mark 16:15 by welcoming students from around the world, helping them to grow in English, and becoming more familiar with American tradition and culture. International Students participate in school academic and extra-curricular programs, this provides authentic diversity and global awareness development for the student body which enhances a core value (discipleship) at East Linn Christian Academy. International students are placed with a qualified host family who can provide additional support to them during their intercultural journey. The school provides both short and long stay opportunities, with many students continuing on to graduate from ELC.

== Athletics ==
East Linn Christian Academy competes in the Oregon School Activities Association as part of the 2A-3 Central Valley Conference. Middle and high school sports offered are baseball, basketball, cross country, golf, boys soccer, track & field, and volleyball. Elementary students can participate in track & field. The school also hosts a number of community sport camps for all grades from Kinder to 12th grade, which can be found on their online sports page under the sports camp link at.

=== State championships ===
- Boys' Basketball: 2012
- Boys' Track & Field: 2019, 2023
- Girls' Track & Field: 2017

== Tuition assistance and fundraising ==
ELC offers a Tuition Assistance Fund to ensure affordable Christian education for our financially diverse community. ELC encourages diversity by designating a portion of the operating budget to be used for financial assistance. The school has a number of fundraisers throughout the year to raise money to help off-set operating cost short-falls, tuition assistance, program and building development.
