= Santiam Academy =

- Academy building in 1936
- Active: 1852–1903
- Affiliations: Methodist Episcopal Church
- Location: Lebanon, Oregon, United States; 44.54515°N 122.90825°W

Santiam Academy was an early primary and secondary school in Lebanon, Oregon, United States, run by the Methodist Episcopal Church.

== History ==
The predecessor of the school was founded by pioneers in 1852 in a log cabin. Santiam Academy was created on January 18, 1854, by an act of the Oregon Territorial Legislature, and a larger building was constructed between 1854 and 1856. Among the members of the first board of trustees were Delazon Smith and David W. Ballard.

Attendance at the school dropped after the establishment of a public school district in 1870, and the academy shut down during the 1903–1904 school year. The church then turned the property over to the Lebanon School District. The building was torn down in the 1930s; in 1945, Santiam School was built on the site, across from Lebanon High School. Santiam School closed in 1982 and was torn down in 2002. The site is now a Lebanon city park.

== Notable alumni ==
- Owen Nickerson Denny, judge, United States consul general to China, introduced the ring-necked pheasant to the U.S.
- Melvin Clark George, U.S. Representative
- Will Orian "O.W." Trine, professional runner and college track and basketball coach

== Notable administrators and faculty ==
- William Holman Odell, Surveyor General of Oregon, editor of the Statesman Journal, namesake of Odell Lake

== See also ==
- Bethel College
- Tualatin Academy
- McMinnville College
- Oregon Institute
