= Frederic Balch =

American author

Frederic H. Balch
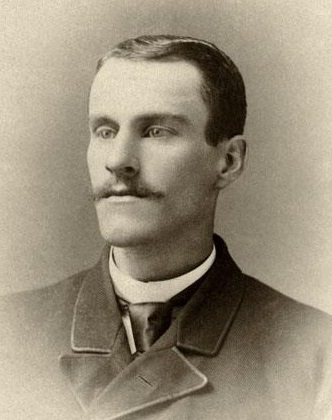
- Oregon author Frederic Balch
- Born: December 14, 1861; Lebanon, Oregon
- Died: June 3, 1891 (aged 29); Portland, Oregon
- Education: Home schooled
- Occupation: Missionary
- Writing career
- Notable work: The Bridge of the Gods

Frederic Homer Balch (1861—1891) was an American author from the Pacific Northwest, best known for The Bridge of the Gods: A Romance of Indian Oregon, the only work published during his brief life. Balch was the first Northwest writer to make Native Americans major characters and the first to celebrate the Northwest landscape, its primal forest, great rivers, and volcanic mountains.

Balch died of tuberculosis at 29 years old. During his life he wrestled with constant poverty, a lack of formal education, and the paradoxical isolation of the frontier wilderness whose scenery he extolled. While probably still a teenager Balch had a clear authorial vision: "To make Oregon as famous as Scott made Scotland; to make the Cascades as widely known as the Highlands;...to make the splendid scenery of the Willammette the background for romance full of passion and grandeur." (Note: Sir Walter Scott (1771-1832) was a poet and novelist then famous for his historical fiction, such as Waverly, Ivanhoe, and The Heart of Midlothian.)

== Early life ==
Born in Lebanon, Oregon, on December 14, 1861, to James A. Balch and Harriet Maria Snider, Balch was primarily tutored at home by his father, who was a law graduate of Wabash College in Indiana. Both his parents had come by covered wagon from Indiana to Oregon, respectively in 1851 and 1852. An orphan, Harriet Snider was married and widowed twice before marrying James Balch. Frederic Balch thus had two older siblings, a beloved half-sister, Allie Gallagher, who strongly encouraged his writing, and a half-brother, William Benson Helm, whose adventurous spirit he greatly admired.

Because of Harriet's asthma, in 1871 the Balch family sought a drier climate east of the Cascade Range and moved to a farm near Goldendale, at the time in Washington Territory. Then almost ten, young Frederic first beheld the towering basalt cliffs, the silvery waterfalls, and the roaring cascades of the Columbia River Gorge, an experience that impressed him deeply and found expression in his later fiction. Fascinated by the local Indians, young Balch learned Chinook Jargon, a Northwest trade language drawing on a mixture of native vocabulary, French, and English, and some Klickitat, a local tribe in the region. As his younger sister, Gertrude Balch Ingalls, later wrote, no lodge or camp was too remote "if at the end of the trail he found a representative of some old tribe, who remembered fragments of... legends... told by his forefathers." Unlike many of his contemporaries, Balch consistently showed respect for Indian traditions, no matter how they differed from his own culture.

The Balches moved their household several more times to various sites near the Columbia River, including a stay at Mount Tabor 6 miles (9.7 km) east of Portland, where, except for a brief stint at Number Six district school near Goldendale. Balch received his only formal instruction at the Mount Tabor school, impressing his teachers by his extensive reading. Growing up in Lyle, a small port on the Washington bank, Balch became the sole breadwinner for his family when his father suffered a mental crisis and was sent to live permanently with a sister in Indiana. Working first as a laborer on neighbors' farms, he later helped lay roadbed for the first railroad track on the Oregon side of the river. Each day he rowed to work, labored a ten-hour day breaking rock, then rowed back to the Lyle farm, writing far into the night and completing Wallulah, an early version of The Bridge of the Gods that focused exclusively on prehistoric Indians.

== Writing career ==
About the time of his 21st birthday, Balch was suddenly converted from his previous agnosticism to Christianity and burned his only manuscript of Wallulah because it contained too many "heathen" elements. Although he at first adopted his mother's Methodism, Balch's religious beliefs gradually evolved into a "liberal" Christianity that accepted all people, "regardless of race or creed," as children of God. He first worked as a home missionary, serving local communities along the Columbia. In 1887 he was officially ordained in the Congregational Church, and moved to his largest congregation in Hood River, Oregon, where he organized the building of a new church. In 1887, while holding innumerable revivals notable for their quiet spirituality, he also began writing The Bridge of the Gods, introducing the character of Cecil Grey, a New England Puritan minister who, in the early 1690s, embarks on a transcontinental quest as a missionary to Native Americans.

=== The Bridge of the Gods ===
In the idealistic figure of Grey, Balch offers an outsider's perspective on the Northwest Pacific native culture, which the missionary views with mixed emotions. Early in the narrative Balch creates a scene that illustrates the romance's worldview, in which physical matter, unseen spirit, and human minds are subtly intertwined. While still in his New England village, Grey experiences a waking vision in which he sees throngs of Indians crossing a massive natural bridge arching over an unknown western river. The landform unveiled in this epiphany becomes the object of Grey's quest as he traverses the wilderness of North America. (Note: Although today's literary critics rarely draw the distinction, many nineteenth century writers differentiated between the novel, which represents physical and psychological realism, and the romance, a form that may transcend the familiar and probable, such as Nathaniel Hawthorne's The Marble Faun and The House of the Seven Gables. (Richard Chase, The American Novel and Its Tradition, New York: Doubleday, 1957.))

When Grey reaches the Columbia region, he is confronted with the character of Multnomah, a despotic native chief who rules over a vast empire, extending from Mount Shasta, in what is now Northern California, to tribes living farther north, in what is now British Columbia. An implacable warrior of "indomitable will," Multnomah despises Grey's message of love and peace, while permitting the missionary freedom to roam and observe native customs. Balch utilizes the protagonist's consciousness to describe authoritatively native dress, diet, lodging, and social habits such as gambling and potlatches, in which a host gives a feast, offering rich gifts to every guest.

In her island lodge, Grey also encounters Wallulah, Multnomah's daughter by his deceased Asian wife, who originally sailed to marry an Oriental prince until her ship was storm-driven off course and wrecked on the Oregon coast. Furnished with treasures from her mother's dowry, Wallulah's dwelling contains tapestries, jewels, and manuscripts of poetry, which her mother had taught her to read. Unopened bales of silk also harbor a deadly legacy from the old world that will ultimately destroy her father's people. At his arrival in Multnomah's domain, Grey learns that the bridge of his vision is sacred ("tomanowos," a creation of superhuman forces) and a totem or symbol of the Willamette tribe, over which Multnomah exercised iron control. In native prophecy the bridge's fall will portend the end of the Willamettes, as well as their imperial confederacy of subjected tribes.

Balch mistakenly depicted the natural bridge spanning the Columbia as a soaring stone arch. In his preface to The Bridge of the Gods, he insisted on the bridge's historicity, writing that when it fell, it formed the cascades of the Columbia, the last downriver obstacle to Indian canoes. Geological studies have since vindicated the bridge's former existence, but very different from the way Balch envisioned it. Between about 1416 and 1452 CE a huge landslide — the Bonneville Slides — completely dammed the river, forming a barrier 200–300 feet (61–91 m) high, and permitting indigenous peoples to travel across the river without getting their moccasins wet. The Columbia eventually breached the landslide, but large basaltic slabs may have remained in place to allow tribes to continue crossing. Perhaps by coincidence, Balch set the causeway's collapse close to 1700 CE, the year that the most recent Cascadia subduction zone earthquake convulsed the Pacific Northwest.

=== Other writings ===
Balch planned to make The Bridge of the Gods a mythic prelude to more naturalistic novels he would write to illustrate crucial events in Northwest history, but only Genevive: A Tale of Oregon survives complete. Edited and published posthumously in 1932 by Alfred Powers, then a professor at the University of Oregon, the novel is dedicated to "one, now dead, whose name gives the book its title and whose character is portrayed in its pages." The titular heroine is Genevra Whitcomb, a young woman whom Balch loved and who died unexpectedly at age nineteen in January, 1886. Exploiting an author's prerogative, he fictionally resurrected Geneva, to whom he gave a more familiar form of her name, to unite her with his alter ego, Gudio Colonna. The most autobiographical of his works, the character of Colonna is the son of an Italian patriot and a Native American woman, disparaged as a "half-breed" and almost lynched by the locals. Like Balch, his hero resolves to write the "most brilliant of all Indian romances." As customary in Balch's work, one of the memorable characters is the Indian Princess Winnemah, an aged sorcerer sustained by her hatred for the Anglo-American settlers who have stolen her people's land. For the historian, the novel is a treasure trove of Northwest social life and attitudes, including records of racial prejudice.

Powers also edited Memaloose, a collection of Balch's poems and essays, published in 1934. Shortly before his death, Balch had sketched out six chapters of Kenasket: A Tale of Oregon in 1818, which he described as his "shortest... and best book." Named for an Indian leader who later conducted a mid-century war against whites, the book mixes fictional and credible historical characters in both Alaska and Oregon. During his last days, Balch also wrote his only known short story, "How a Camas Prairie Girl Saw the World," published in 1993. Realistically depicting the effects of poverty and isolation on women on the Washington frontier, the story emphasizes that "household tragedies are [no less] vivid and intense because the actors are clad in print or overalls".

== Death ==
In 1889 Balch took a leave of absence from the Hood River Congregational Church to attend the Pacific Theological Seminary in Oakland, California (now the Pacific School of Religion) in Berkeley. A scholarship student, he carried a full academic load, including Hebrew, Greek, church history, and Christian doctrine, while still writing fiction. In his second year at the seminary, he became ill with tuberculosis, necessitating his return to Hood River in March 1891. He died at the Good Samaritan Hospital in Portland, on June 3, 1891.

== Legacy ==
A major regional writer, Balch was the first author to give the Pacific Northwest a sense of its spectacular topography and the value of its indigenous inhabitants. Overcoming the isolation of the rural frontier, the limits of self-education, and the shortness of his life, Balch achieved only a partial fulfillment of his literary objectives in memorializing native prehistory and in depicting the customs and behaviors of late nineteenth century Oregon society.

== Bibliography ==
- Atwater, Brian et al, The Orphan Tsunami of 1700: Japanese Clues to a Parent Earthquake in North America, Seattle: University of Washington Press, 2nd edition, 2015. ISBN 0295998083
- Balch, Frederic Homer, The Bridge of the Gods: A Romance of Indian Oregon, with an Introduction by Stephen L. Harris, Pullman, Washington: Washington State University Press, 2016. ISBN 9780874223439
- Balch, Frederic Homer, Genevieve: A Tale of Oregon, with an Introduction by Alfred Powers, Portland, Oregon: Metropolitan Press, 1932.
- Balch, Frederic Homer, Memaloose, Portland, Oregon: Metropolitan Press, 1934.
- Powers, Alfred (1935). History of Oregon Literature, Metropolitan Press, Portland, Oregon. OCLC 250868947
- Wiley, Leonard (1970). The Granite Boulder: A Biography of Frederic Homer Balch. Portland, Oregon: Leonard Wiley, ISBN 0911742034
- Sinclair, Sam (April 9, 1962). "A Lebanon Author Made Famous by Two Books-- 'The Bridge of the Gods,' 'Genevieve'". The Lebanon Express.
- "Sketch of Life of Frederic H. Balch". Hood River Glacier. July 6, 1922.
