= Pat McQuistan =

American football player (born 1983)

No. 67, 76, 77, 79
- Position: Offensive tackle

Personal information
- Born: April 30, 1983 (age 43); San Diego, California, U.S.
- Listed height: 6 ft 6 in (1.98 m)
- Listed weight: 317 lb (144 kg)

Career information
- High school: Lebanon (Lebanon, Oregon)
- College: Weber State (2003–2005)
- NFL draft: 2006: 7th round, 211th overall pick

Career history
- Dallas Cowboys (2006−2009); Miami Dolphins (2010); Tennessee Titans (2011)*; New Orleans Saints (2011); Dallas Cowboys (2012)*; Arizona Cardinals (2012); Jacksonville Jaguars (2013)*; Tennessee Titans (2013); Atlanta Falcons (2014)*
- * Offseason or practice squad member only

Career NFL statistics
- Games played: 72
- Games started: 11
- Fumble recoveries: 1
- Stats at Pro Football Reference

Patrick Shawn McQuistan (born April 30, 1983) is an American former professional football player who was an offensive tackle in the National Football League (NFL) for the Dallas Cowboys, Miami Dolphins, New Orleans Saints, and Arizona Cardinals. He played college football for the Weber State Wildcats.

== Early life ==
McQuistan attended and played football at Lebanon High School in Lebanon, Oregon, earning second-team All-Valley League honors as a junior defensive lineman. In his last year, he was moved to the offensive line and earned honorable-mention All-Valley League honors as an offensive tackle and punter.

== College career ==
McQuistan accepted a football scholarship from Weber State University along with his brother Paul, but was declared academically ineligible in 2002. He played baseball as a pitcher for one season at Edmonds Community College. In 2003, he enrolled at Weber State and sat out the season as an academic redshirt.

As a junior in 2004, McQuistan played in 10 games as a backup offensive tackle and guard. He missed the season opener. The team finished with a 1–10 record. As a senior in 2005, McQuistan started 11 games at tackle. The team finished with a 6–5 record.

== Professional career ==
Pre-draft measurables
Height	Weight
6 ft 5 3/4 in (1.97 m)	315 lb (143 kg)
Values from Pro Day

=== Dallas Cowboys (first stint) ===
McQuistan was selected by the Dallas Cowboys in the seventh round (211th overall) of the 2006 NFL draft. He made the team over the previous year starter Rob Petitti. As a rookie, McQuistan was declared inactive for the first 15 games of the season.

In 2008, McQuistan played mainly on special teams. The next year, he was inactive for the first nine games until Marc Colombo was lost for the season with a broken left fibula, he was activated for the remaining seven games, playing mainly on special teams and as a backup.

During his time with the team, McQuistan was a backup offensive tackle and played special teams. He was traded to the Miami Dolphins in exchange for a conditional sixth round draft choice on September 3, 2010. The teams were going to switch 2011 sixth-round draft positions if the Dolphins had the worse record (and higher pick); eventually no exchange was made because that condition was not met.

=== Miami Dolphins ===
In 2010, McQuistan appeared in all 16 games with a career-high eight starts for the Miami Dolphins. At the end of the season his contract was due to expire, and the Dolphins chose to not re-sign him, releasing McQuistan to free agency.

=== Tennessee Titans (first stint) ===
On August 8, 2011, McQuistan signed with the Tennessee Titans and was released on September 2.

=== New Orleans Saints ===
McQuistan signed with the New Orleans Saints on September 27, 2011. He played in 10 regular season and two playoff games. His contributions came as a blocking tight end and on special teams.

=== Dallas Cowboys (second stint) ===
On June 8, 2012, McQuistan was signed by the Cowboys to provide depth for training camp practices, reuniting with the team for whom he played 3 seasons. He was cut on August 31.

=== Arizona Cardinals ===
On September 3, 2012, McQuistan was signed by the Arizona Cardinals after offensive linemen Levi Brown and Jeremy Bridges were lost for the season. He was waived on September 25 and later re-signed October 16. McQuistan played in six games (three starts) at right guard.

=== Jacksonville Jaguars ===
The Jacksonville Jaguars signed McQuistan on August 6, 2013, the same team for whom his brother Paul played in 2009. He was released on August 30.

=== Tennessee Titans (second stint) ===
McQuistan signed with the Titans on October 30, 2013. He was inactive in two games played while on the roster and was released on November 12.

=== Atlanta Falcons ===
On August 18, 2014, McQuisten was signed by the Atlanta Falcons for depth purposes after Sam Baker was placed on the injured reserve list. He was released on August 29.

== Personal life ==
McQuisten's twin brother Paul also played at Weber State University and in the National Football League. Both brothers played for the Jacksonville Jaguars, albeit at separate times.
