= W. O. Trine =

American track and basketball coach (1903–1907)

W.O. "Dad" Trine
- Trine during his time at OAC

Biographical details
- Born: 1869; Lebanon, Oregon, U.S.
- Died: July 13, 1907 (age 38); Corvallis, Oregon, U.S.

Coaching career (HC unless noted)

Track
- 1896, 1898–1901: University of Oregon
- 1903–1906: Oregon Agricultural

Basketball
- 1903–1906: Oregon Agricultural

Will Orian "Dad" Trine (1869 – July 13, 1907), best known by his initials, was a professional runner and collegiate track and basketball coach and trainer who was instrumental in the development of the early athletic programs at the University of Oregon at Eugene and Oregon Agricultural College (OAC, today's Oregon State University) in Corvallis, Oregon.

A native of Oregon, Trine became a prominent competitive sprinter in California before turning to coaching when the popularity of that spectator sport began to dwindle in the 1890s. He was a coach of track, basketball, a conditioning coach for football, and director of athletics for OAC.

== Biography ==
=== Early years ===
Athletic in build and fleet afoot, Trine began running in the 1880s while at the Santiam Academy in Lebanon, Oregon. The academy was a private school, founded in 1854 by the Methodist-Episcopal Church.

=== Professional runner ===
After graduation, Trine ran professional footraces, with a top time credited of 9 and 4/5 seconds in the 100 yard dash. His top time in the 220-yard dash was 22 seconds.

Foot racing was a popular competitive sport throughout the 1880s, when Trine was at his athletic peak, with side-betting on outcomes no doubt a principal attraction of the events. Runners or their sponsors would put up half of the purse, referees would be selected, and untimed mano a mano races held, winner-take-all.

In one 100-yard sprint held in Modesto, California, on December 28, 1889, Trine collected a $500 purse in a heads-up race with Charles Gibson. Trine was slated to run again the next day in the same city against W.A. Ross in a 200-yard sprint for a prize of $1,000. No news of the result was published.

When interest in the sport began to decline in the 1890s, Trine moved from racer to coach.

For several years he was associated with Edward "Dad" Moulton, former sprinter and pioneer track coach at the University of California.

=== Coach and physical director ===
In 1896, Trine was put in charge of track and field work at the University of Oregon in Eugene. The role of track coach was temporary, however, and his time there was brief. In 1898, Trine was brought back by the U of O Athletic Club to again train and coach the school's track squad. He would return again in that capacity annually until 1901.

Coach Trine with an OAC track team, probably 1904.

In 1903, following the resignation of the physical director of Oregon Agricultural College, Jacob Patterson, Trine was appointed his successor. Officially titled the "Director of Athletics," Trine was touted as one of the most efficient trainers on the coast" at the time of his hiring.

In addition to his main job as physical director at OAC during the academic year, Trine worked as a coach for other clubs and schools throughout Western Oregon, including coaching the Multnomah track team in 1905, as well as brief stints at Oregon Normal School, Willamette University, and Pacific University.

=== Death and legacy ===
A special issue of the campus literary magazine in June 1905 that served as a de facto OAC yearbook published an extensive story about "Dad" Trine, in which the writer emphasized Trine's advocacy of "strict temperance and chastity" for the construction of a winning athlete. "The effect of a season's training under him is to strengthen one's moral nature and to eliminate any habits that tend to weaken or harm the body," the writer noted. It is ironic, then, that this paragon of clean and wholesome living would die an early death of cancer.

During the summer of 1905, Trine was diagnosed with bone cancer in his jaw. He traveled to San Francisco for prescribed bone removal surgery, but upon arriving there learned that the procedure could be done as well in Portland, so he returned to Oregon immediately to undergo the operation closer to his family and home. Late in July 1905 he underwent surgery at St. Vincent's Hospital that removed his chin, with doctors believing at the time that the disease had been isolated and removed and that Trine's survival prospects were good.

Well-known and popular in the coaching world on the Pacific coast, a benefit athletic carnival was organized by coaches and athletes to help defray Trine's expenses, with organizers including coach Bill Hayward of the University of Oregon, high jumper Bert Kerrigan of the Multnomah Athletic Club, and a host of others.

Trine continued to work through constant daily pain and an atrophying body, during which time "he declined from a man of great strength to a mere shadow." Unfortunately, the bone cancer recurred and in May 1907 he was deemed inoperable. He spent his last two months confined at home, his health steadily deteriorating.

Trine finally expired on July 13, 1907, at 7 p.m. at his home in Corvallis. A funeral was held and his body was interred at Eugene.

"No eulogy is necessary to commemorate W.O. Trine's life," a writer in the OAC Barometer stated when announcing his death in the fall of 1907. "It stands out full and free with a clean record... At all times did he foster pure athletics and only men of clean habits were permitted on his teams."

== Works ==
- W.O. Trine, "Rules for Athletes That Will Not Be Amiss: To Those Who Work on the Track," [Eugene] Morning Register, April 15, 1896, p. 1.
