= Waterloo, Oregon =

- City
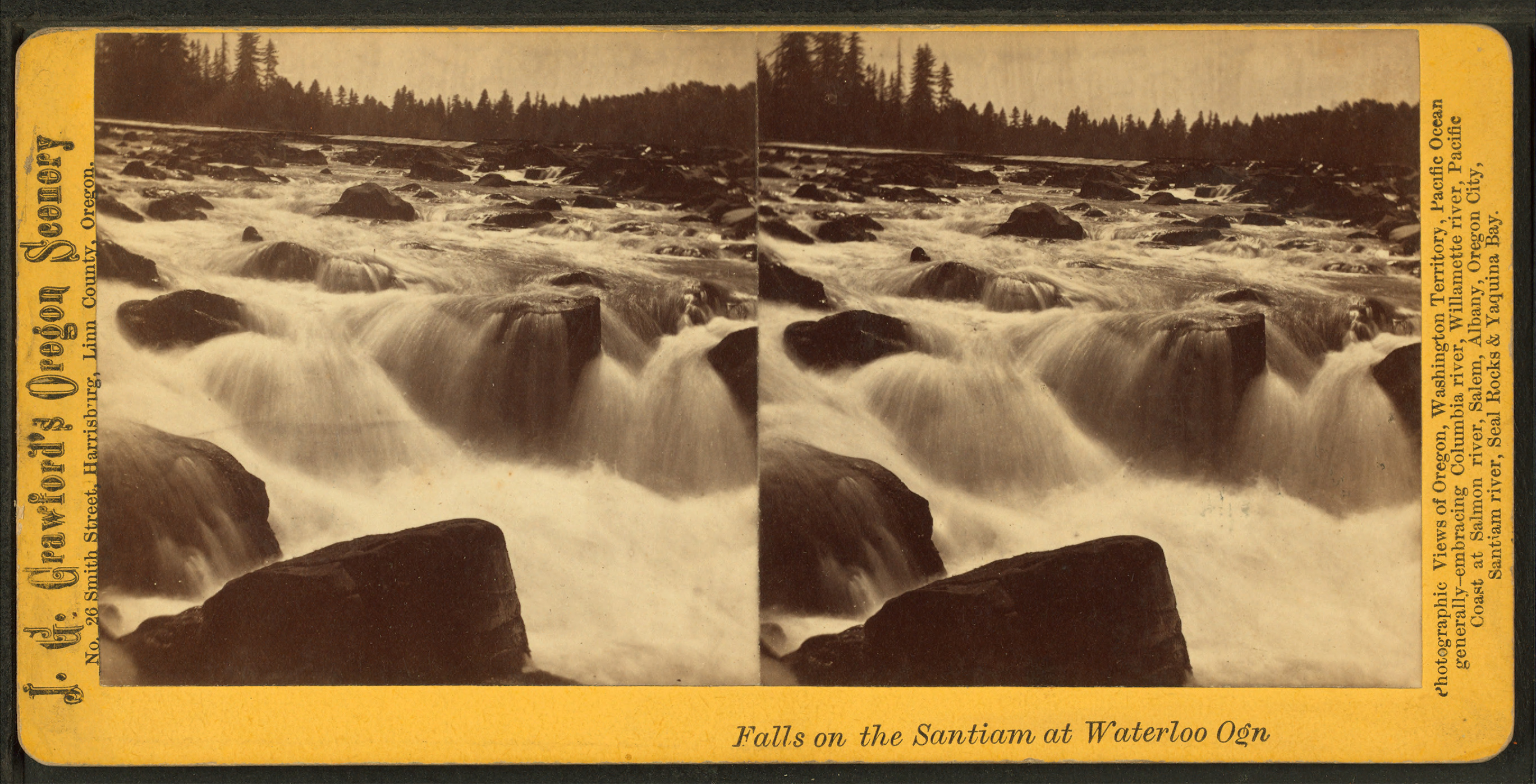
- Historic stereoscope image of the Santiam River at Waterloo

- Location in Oregon
- Coordinates: 44°29′41″N 122°49′27″W
- Country: United States
- State: Oregon
- County: Linn
- Incorporated: 1893

Government
  - Mayor: Justin Cary

Area
  - Total: 0.12 sq mi (0.31 km^{2})
  - Land: 0.12 sq mi (0.31 km^{2})
  - Water: 0 sq mi (0.00 km^{2})
- Elevation: 404 ft (123 m)

Population (2020)
  - Total: 222
  - Density: 1,830.4/sq mi (706.72/km^{2})
- Time zone: UTC-8 (Pacific)
  - Summer (DST): UTC-7 (Pacific)
- ZIP code: 97355
- Area codes: 458 and 541
- FIPS code: 41-79050
- GNIS feature ID: 2413454

Waterloo is a city in Linn County, Oregon, United States. The population was 229 at the 2010 census.

The city's name, a joking reference to the Battle of Waterloo, stemmed from a 19th-century court decision that settled a land dispute at Kees Mill along the South Santiam River. After the dispute ended, Kees Mill became known as Waterloo.

The federal government established a post office at Waterloo on January 5, 1875. S. D. Granger was its first postmaster. The post office closed in 1974.

== Geography ==
According to the United States Census Bureau, the town has a total area of 0.12 square miles (0.31 km^{2}), all land. The closest city is Lebanon.

=== Climate ===
This region experiences warm (but not hot) and dry summers, with no average monthly temperatures above 71.6 °F (22.0 °C). According to the Köppen Climate Classification system, Waterloo has a warm-summer Mediterranean climate, abbreviated "Csb" on climate maps.

== Demographics ==
Historical population
Census	Pop.	Note	%±
1900	59		—
1910	83		40.7%
1920	82		−1.2%
1960	151		—
1970	186		23.2%
1980	221		18.8%
1990	191		−13.6%
2000	239		25.1%
2010	229		−4.2%
2020	222		−3.1%
U.S. Decennial Census

=== 2010 census ===
As of the census of 2010, there were 229 people, 79 households, and 62 families living in the town. The population density was 1,908.3 inhabitants per square mile (736.8/km^{2}). There were 87 housing units at an average density of 725.0 per square mile (279.9/km^{2}). The racial makeup of the town was 96.5% White, 1.3% Native American, 0.4% from other races, and 1.7% from two or more races. Hispanic or Latino of any race were 5.7% of the population.

There were 79 households, of which 29.1% had children under the age of 18 living with them, 62.0% were married couples living together, 11.4% had a female householder with no husband present, 5.1% had a male householder with no wife present, and 21.5% were non-families. 17.7% of all households were made up of individuals, and 3.8% had someone living alone who was 65 years of age or older. The average household size was 2.90 and the average family size was 3.27.

The median age in the town was 42.3 years. 22.7% of residents were under the age of 18; 7% were between the ages of 18 and 24; 25.3% were from 25 to 44; 31.5% were from 45 to 64; and 13.5% were 65 years of age or older. The gender makeup of the town was 52.8% male and 47.2% female.

=== 2000 census ===
As of the census of 2000, there were 239 people, 83 households, and 60 families living in the city. The population density was 1,583.2 inhabitants per square mile (611.3/km^{2}). There were 91 housing units at an average density of 602.8 per square mile (232.7/km^{2}). The racial makeup of the city was 97.49% White, 0.42% African American, 1.26% Native American, 0.42% Asian, and 0.42% from two or more races. Hispanic or Latino of any race were 2.09% of the population.

There were 83 households, out of which 27.7% had children under the age of 18 living with them, 59.0% were married couples living together, 8.4% had a female householder with no husband present, and 27.7% were non-families. 20.5% of all households were made up of individuals, and 9.6% had someone living alone who was 65 years of age or older. The average household size was 2.88 and the average family size was 3.33.

In the city, the population was spread out, with 29.3% under the age of 18, 7.5% from 18 to 24, 25.5% from 25 to 44, 24.7% from 45 to 64, and 13.0% who were 65 years of age or older. The median age was 34 years. For every 100 females, there were 104.3 males. For every 100 females age 18 and over, there were 103.6 males.

The median income for a household in the city was $34,688, and the median income for a family was $39,583. Males had a median income of $32,250 versus $25,000 for females. The per capita income for the city was $13,931. About 10.9% of families and 11.7% of the population were below the poverty line, including 8.8% of those under the age of eighteen and 13.8% of those 65 or over.
