= Lebanon High School (Oregon) =

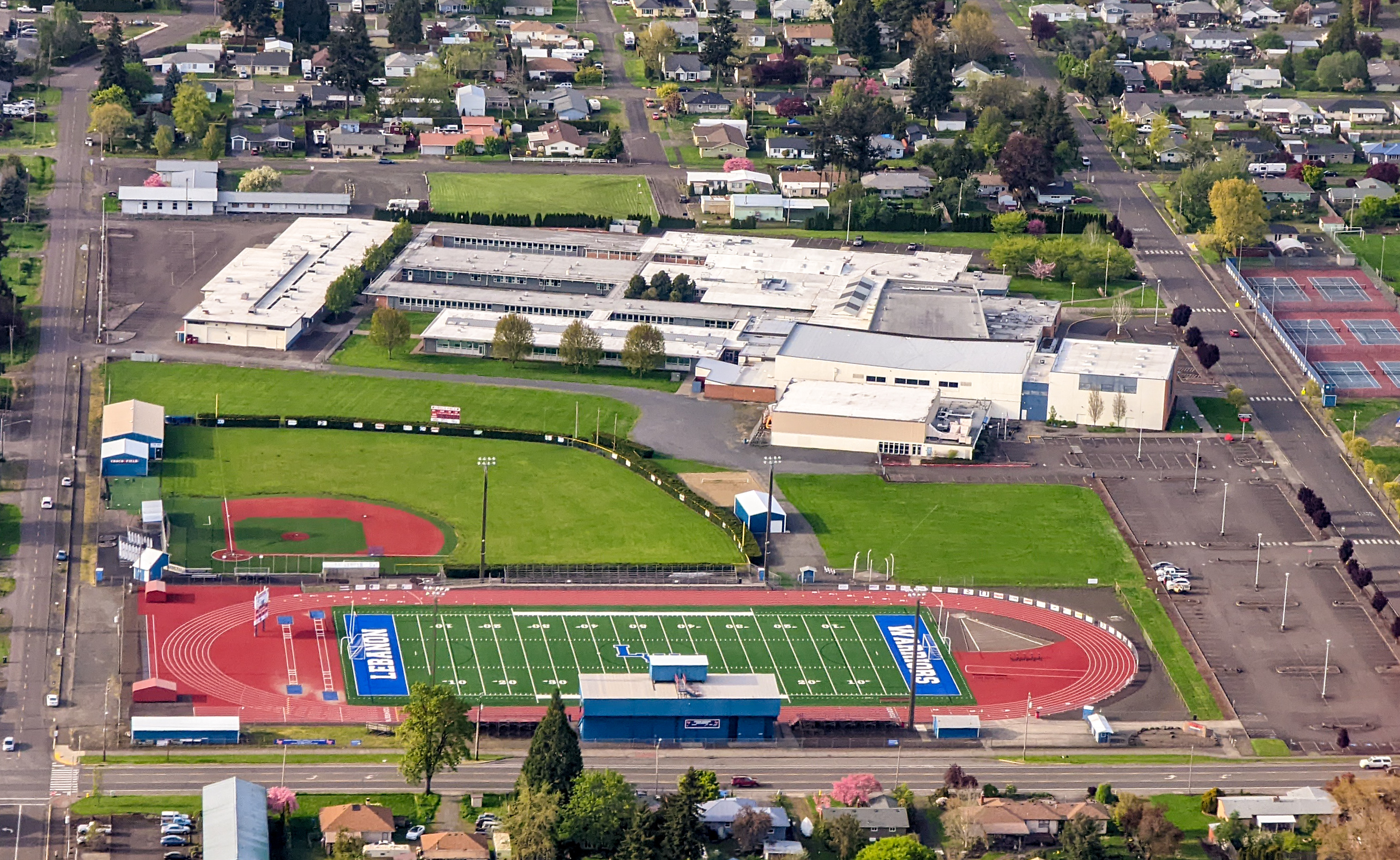

Location
- 1700 S 5th Street; Lebanon, (Linn County), Oregon 97355; United States; 44.5298°N 122.9132°W

Information
- Type: Public high school
- Opened: 1909, 1957
- School district: Lebanon Community Schools
- Principal: Craig Swanson
- Teaching staff: 59.00 (FTE)
- Grades: 9–12
- Enrollment: 1,240 (2023–2024)
- Student to teacher ratio: 21.02
- Colors: Crimson red; Royal blue
- Athletics conference: OSAA Mid-Willamette Conference 5A-3
- Mascot: Warriors
- Newspaper: The Warrior Spirit
- Yearbook: The Warrior
- Website: high-school.lebanon.k12.or.us

Lebanon High School (LHS), formerly known as Lebanon Union High School, is a high school located in Lebanon, Oregon, United States.

== History ==
=== Original building ===
A postcard image of the original Lebanon High School

Lebanon High School was originally built in the spring of 1909 across the street from the old Santiam Academy (established 1851), at a cost of $40,000, by Mr. McChesney of Albany, Oregon, contractor, and P.C. Brown of Portland, Oregon, architect. At the time, the building was the pride of Lebanon and "was modern in every way, complete with a brick structure, concrete foundation, and several large grade rooms, four classrooms, a large assembly room along with a library, office, halls, and a basement". These modern features extended to include electricity, running water, and central heating.

The building opened September 9, 1909, as a K-12 institution serving the population of Lebanon. Over the next few decades, the population of Lebanon grew and the attendance at the institution swelled to such a degree that it eventually became a high school solely serving grades 9-12.

South and north wings were added to the building in 1947 and 1948 respectively, as well as a gym in 1950 and an outdoor pool in 1951. When the high school students moved to their new site in 1957, it became the Lebanon Junior High School (LMS).

=== New site ===
In 1957, Lebanon Union High School was built at the 41-acre (170,000 m^{2}), Fifth Street and Airport Road site where it is currently located. This new school was an improvement over the previous facilities, being designed to hold 1200 students. The school has gone through various renovations in 1958, 1964, 1966, 1967, 1969, 1971, 1978, and from 2003 to 2005.

LHS achieved its highest attendance of 1650 students in 1973.

In 1997, the name of Lebanon Union High School changed to Lebanon High School.

The most recent round of renovation was by far the most extensive since the school's initial construction. Intended to deal with issues of insufficient quality facilities, asbestos, and the planned changes to the school's structure, this involved the demolition of several buildings, including the literature wing (which was rebuilt as the short-lived "Freshman Hall") and art wing, as well as the construction of a new gym, parking lot, and tennis courts. In addition to this, and most notably for students attending at the time, nearly every part of the main building was renovated, creating what some students would describe as a changing rat maze of hallways and barriers.

For the 151 years, from 1851 when Santiam Academy was established to 2002 when LMS was demolished, the site of the original LHS stands as the longest continuously operating public education facility in state history.

== Academics ==
In 2008, 42% of the school's seniors received a high school diploma after four years. As of the 2017–18 school year, the four-year (on-time) graduation rate had risen to 73%, with another 7% graduating in five years. As of the 2022–23 school year, the four-year graduation rate was 79%, with another 6% graduating in five years.

== Notable alumni ==
- John Bates, NFL Player for the Washington Commanders
- Eric Castle, former NFL player
- Pat McQuistan, former NFL player
- Paul McQuistan, former NFL player
- Dave Roberts (third baseman) Former MLB player
