= Sodaville, Oregon =

- City
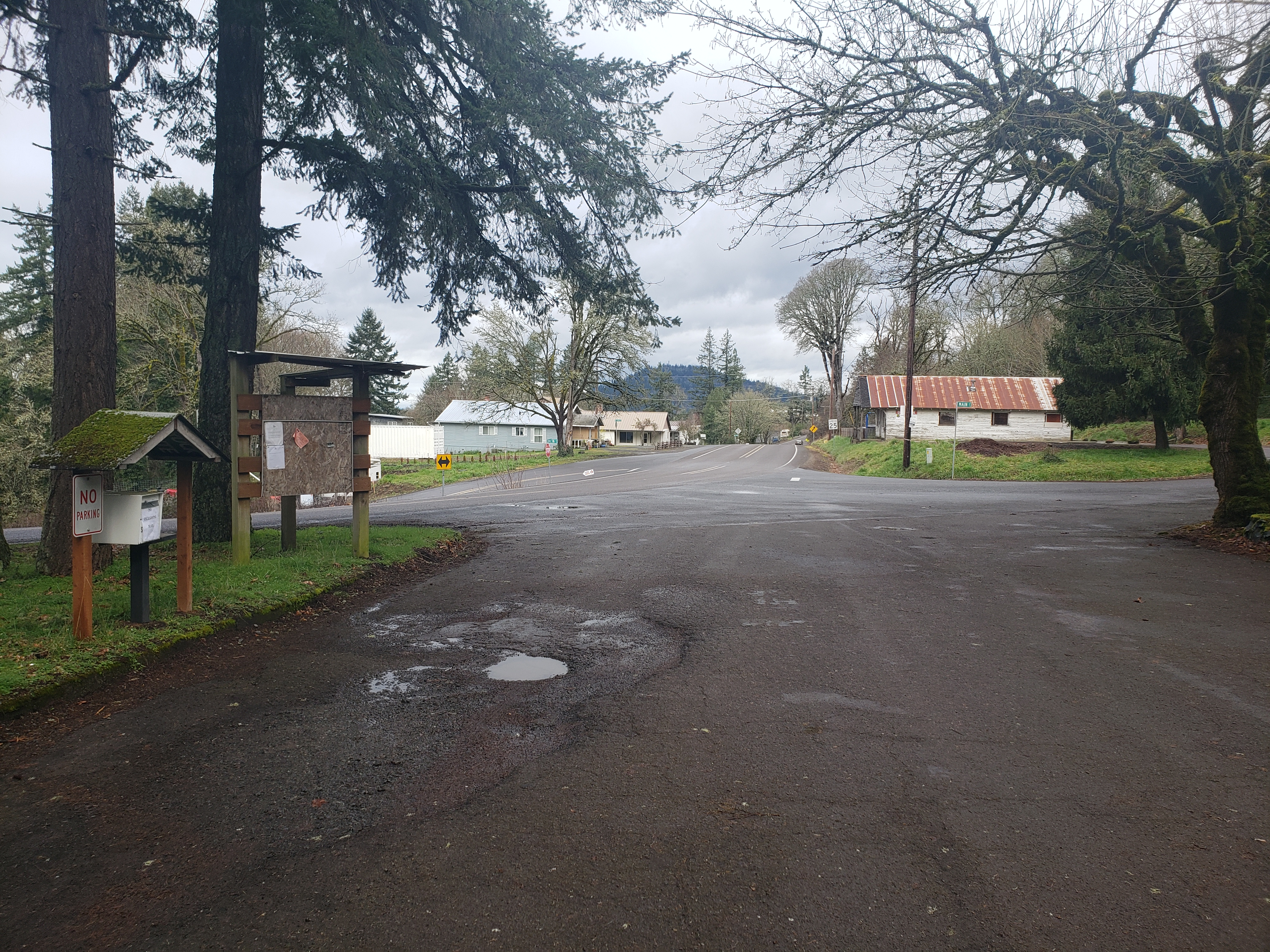

- Location in Oregon
- Coordinates: 44°28′57″N 122°52′14″W
- Country: United States
- State: Oregon
- County: Linn
- Incorporated: 1880

Government
  - Type: Council-manager government
  - Mayor: Brian Lewis
  - City Manager: Brandi Libra

Area
  - Total: 0.31 sq mi (0.80 km^{2})
  - Land: 0.31 sq mi (0.80 km^{2})
  - Water: 0 sq mi (0.00 km^{2})
- Elevation: 528 ft (161 m)

Population (2020)
  - Total: 360
  - Density: 1,165.0/sq mi (449.79/km^{2})
- Time zone: UTC-8 (Pacific)
  - Summer (DST): UTC-7 (Pacific)
- ZIP code: 97355
- Area codes: 458 and 541
- FIPS code: 41-68550
- GNIS feature ID: 2411922
- Website: sodaville.org

Sodaville is a city in Linn County, Oregon, United States. The population was 360 at the 2020 census.

The city's name comes from the nearby Sodaville Mineral Springs. A post office at Sodaville operated from 1871 to 1933.

== Geography ==
According to the United States Census Bureau, the city has a total area of 0.31 square miles (0.80 km^{2}), all land.

== Demographics ==
Historical population
Census	Pop.	Note	%±
1880	56		—
1890	66		17.9%
1900	178		169.7%
1910	110		−38.2%
1920	72		−34.5%
1930	77		6.9%
1940	99		28.6%
1950	157		58.6%
1960	145		−7.6%
1970	178		22.8%
1980	145		−18.5%
1990	192		32.4%
2000	290		51.0%
2010	308		6.2%
2020	360		16.9%
U.S. Decennial Census

=== 2020 census ===
As of the 2020 census, Sodaville had a population of 360. The median age was 41.5 years. 25.8% of residents were under the age of 18 and 13.1% of residents were 65 years of age or older. For every 100 females there were 103.4 males, and for every 100 females age 18 and over there were 107.0 males age 18 and over.

100.0% of residents lived in urban areas, while 0% lived in rural areas.

There were 132 households in Sodaville, of which 32.6% had children under the age of 18 living in them. Of all households, 44.7% were married-couple households, 25.8% were households with a male householder and no spouse or partner present, and 15.9% were households with a female householder and no spouse or partner present. About 24.2% of all households were made up of individuals and 12.9% had someone living alone who was 65 years of age or older.

There were 134 housing units, of which 1.5% were vacant. Among occupied housing units, 85.6% were owner-occupied and 14.4% were renter-occupied. The homeowner vacancy rate was <0.1% and the rental vacancy rate was <0.1%.

Racial composition as of the 2020 census
Race	Number	Percent
White	305	84.7%
Black or African American	3	0.8%
American Indian and Alaska Native	4	1.1%
Asian	9	2.5%
Native Hawaiian and Other Pacific Islander	0	0%
Some other race	8	2.2%
Two or more races	31	8.6%
Hispanic or Latino (of any race)	21	5.8%

=== 2010 census ===
As of the census of 2010, there were 308 people, 116 households, and 85 families living in the city. The population density was 993.5 inhabitants per square mile (383.6/km^{2}). There were 121 housing units at an average density of 390.3 per square mile (150.7/km^{2}). The racial makeup of the city was 89.3% White, 0.6% African American, 1.6% Native American, 1.0% Asian, 0.3% from other races, and 7.1% from two or more races. Hispanic or Latino of any race were 1.9% of the population.

There were 116 households, of which 34.5% had children under the age of 18 living with them, 62.1% were married couples living together, 6.0% had a female householder with no husband present, 5.2% had a male householder with no wife present, and 26.7% were non-families. 19.0% of all households were made up of individuals, and 8.6% had someone living alone who was 65 years of age or older. The average household size was 2.66 and the average family size was 3.08.

The median age in the city was 43.5 years. 24.7% of residents were under the age of 18; 6.8% were between the ages of 18 and 24; 20.1% were from 25 to 44; 35.4% were from 45 to 64; and 13% were 65 years of age or older. The gender makeup of the city was 51.9% male and 48.1% female.

=== 2000 census ===
As of the census of 2000, there were 290 people, 105 households, and 80 families living in the city. The population density was 921.0 inhabitants per square mile (355.6/km^{2}). There were 115 housing units at an average density of 365.2 per square mile (141.0/km^{2}). The racial makeup of the city was 92.07% White, 0.69% African American, 1.38% Native American, 2.07% Asian, 0.69% Pacific Islander, 1.38% from other races, and 1.72% from two or more races. Hispanic or Latino of any race were 4.14% of the population.

There were 105 households, out of which 37.1% had children under the age of 18 living with them, 61.0% were married couples living together, 10.5% had a female householder with no husband present, and 22.9% were non-families. 18.1% of all households were made up of individuals, and 7.6% had someone living alone who was 65 years of age or older. The average household size was 2.76 and the average family size was 3.15.

In the city, the population was spread out, with 29.0% under the age of 18, 6.2% from 18 to 24, 28.3% from 25 to 44, 24.5% from 45 to 64, and 12.1% who were 65 years of age or older. The median age was 38 years. For every 100 females, there were 94.6 males. For every 100 females age 18 and over, there were 94.3 males.

The median income for a household in the city was $41,875, and the median income for a family was $45,682. Males had a median income of $28,750 versus $21,875 for females. The per capita income for the city was $14,596. About 7.7% of families and 8.9% of the population were below the poverty line, including 12.7% of those under the age of eighteen and 3.2% of those 65 or over.
