= Reya Sunshine =

American pornographic film actress, director, and producer

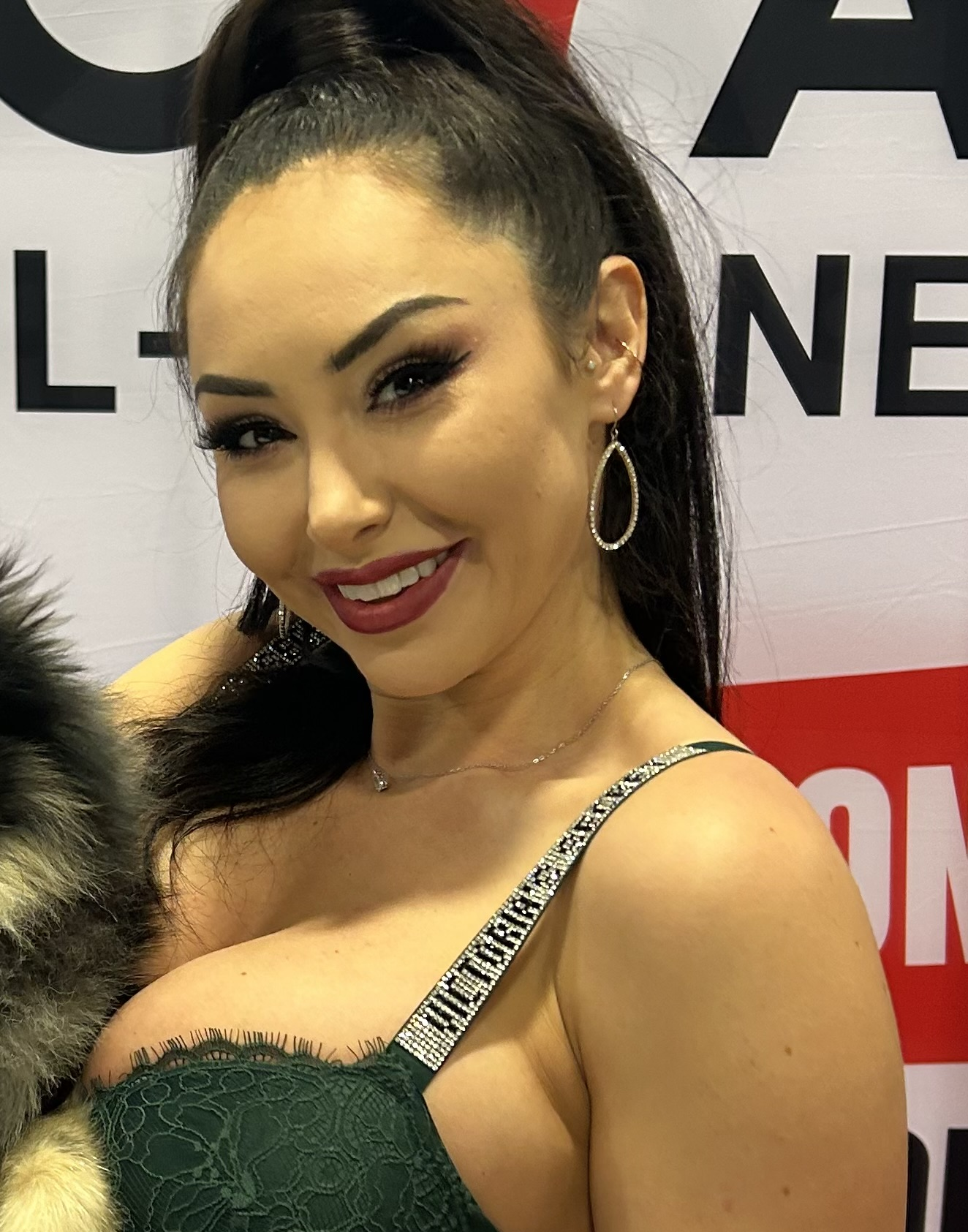
- Sunshine in 2024
- Born: California, U.S.
- Education: University of California, Santa Cruz
- Occupations: Pornographic film actress; producer; director
- Years active: 2016–present

Reya Sunshine is an American pornographic film actress, producer, and director based in Miami, Florida. She was born and raised in Northern California, and has pursued a course through the adult entertainment industry by webcamming, feature dancing, modeling for virtual reality apps and sex toys, and independently producing video content.

== Education ==
Sunshine received a bachelor's degree in psychology from the University of California, Santa Cruz. She graduated magna cum laude and specialized in humanistic psychology. While attending the university, she also studied dance and yoga.

== Career ==
=== Pole dancing ===
After graduating from the university, Sunshine worked briefly as a yoga instructor. She also started taking pole dancing classes around that time, and then obtained a job as an exotic dancer at Sporty's Bikini Bar in Sunnyvale, California, where she worked for three-and-a-half years.

=== Webcam modeling/media personality ===
Sunshine began working as a webcam model on January 1, 2016 on the myfreecams website. She has expressed that synergizing her efforts of webcamming, exotic dancing, social media, and producing video clips greatly expanded her following. In 2018, she produced a video for her YouTube channel entitled "Are You Cut Out for Camming?" that became one of ten primary sources used for the study "Live Play, Live Sex: The Parallel Labors of Video Game Live Streaming and Webcam Modeling," that was published in the Sexualities academic journal in December 2022.

In 2016, she began working as a guest anchor on Naked News, and in 2018 won their "Guest Anchor Madness" fan voting competition.

=== Feature dancing ===
In late 2016, Sunshine left Northern California and began working as a feature dancer. She booked her first feature show in Los Angeles, and eventually settled in Miami. From there, she launched several feature tours. During Super Bowl 2020 weekend, Sunshine also headlined Thursday and Friday night performances at Tootsie's Cabaret in Miami.

=== Virtual reality/sex toys ===
Sunshine has also worked in virtual reality performing, and is a VR model for the Gold Club SF VR application, which is based on a strip club experience that was launched in 2017. She has stated that she assesses adult entertainment is likely to be a significant driver for the virtual reality industry in the future.

At the AVN convention in 2018, Sunshine appeared with a sex doll manufactured in her likeness by Crafty Fantasy. Mike Catherwood, then-host of the "Control Freak" mini-documentary series that was attending the convention to film an episode entitled "The Future of Porn," focused on Sunshine's doll in a segment exploring the appeal of sex dolls. Catherwood noted that the doll's design, which was based on Sunshine's personality, appeared to connect particularly well with the convention's participants.

In September 2022, the Amsterdam-based sex tech company Kiiroo announced it had released a molded stroker sleeve based on Sunshine.

=== Video content production ===
Sunshine has independently produced over 200 video clips, which she distributed via clip websites. She released several clips on the first day she started webcamming, and in her early days of producing content, she typically filmed it with iPhones or webcams. She eventually transitioned to professional-grade video, lighting, and sound equipment, and has characterized her current productions as similar in quality to those released by large porn production companies. She has stated she has employed a strategy of gradually expanding the types of content she has produced, starting with solo, then girl-girl, and then moving to boy-girl videos. She produced and directed her first boy-girl video co-starring Sean Lawless in December 2020, and it received the 2021 Vid of the Year Award from ManyVids. In 2021, she was also named Clip Artist of the Year by XBiz.

Although primarily an independent producer, Sunshine has occasionally performed in works produced by others. In 2019, she starred in the first episode of the soft-core porn parody series LadyKiller TV with Nikki Benz, which was entitled "Camp Blood Sex" and based on Friday the 13th.

=== Awards show hosting ===
Sunshine co-hosted the XBiz Cam Awards with SureCakes on May 27, 2021, for a virtual audience. She also hosted the 40th AVN Awards with Abella Danger and stand-up comedian Matt Rife, which was held at the Resorts World casino resort in Las Vegas, Nevada on January 7, 2023, and marked the show's return to a live audience for the first time since 2020. After the selection of Danger and Sunshine as hosts, AVN Media Network CEO Tony Rios stated "We think Abella Danger and Reya Sunshine represent the best of the best in the adult industry today and we couldn't be more excited to have them usher in the next era of the AVN Awards Show in Las Vegas."

== Awards and nominations ==
Xbiz Awards
Year	Category	Result
2019	Best Scene, Clip Site; Rocking the Stage (2018)	Nominated
2019	Clip Artist of the Year - Female	Nominated
2021	Clip Artist of the Year - Female	Won
2022	Clip Artist of the Year - Female	Nominated
2023	Clip Artist of the Year - Female	Nominated

ManyVids Awards
Year	Category	Result
2021	Vid of the Year	Won
