= Lebanon, Oregon =

- City
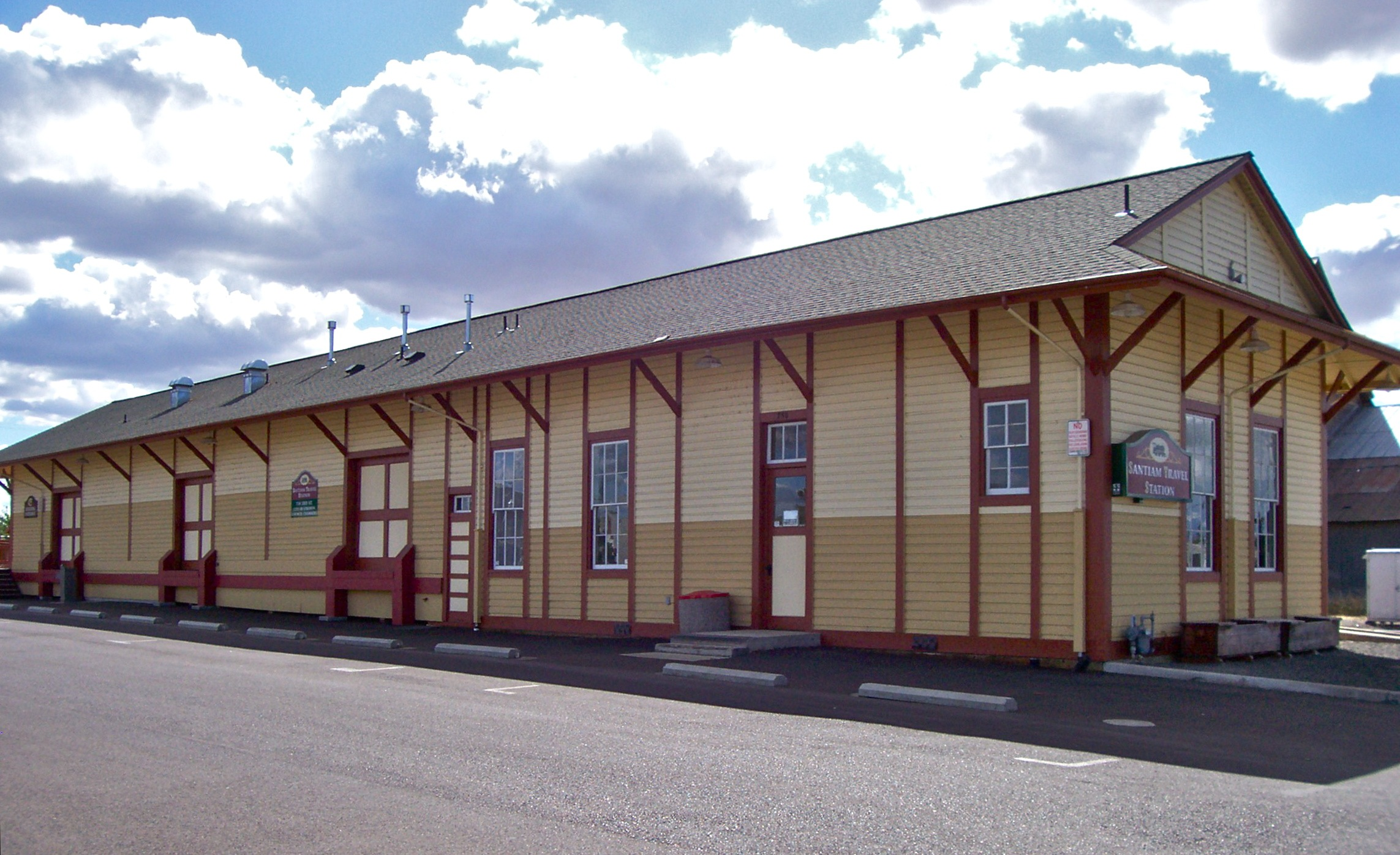
- Former railroad station in downtown Lebanon
- Motto: "The town that friendliness built"
- Location in Oregon
- Coordinates: 44°31′54″N 122°54′25″W
- Country: United States
- State: Oregon
- County: Linn
- Incorporated: 1878

Government
  - Mayor: Kenneth Jackola

Area
  - Total: 7.25 sq mi (18.79 km^{2})
  - Land: 7.02 sq mi (18.19 km^{2})
  - Water: 0.23 sq mi (0.60 km^{2})
- Elevation: 348 ft (106 m)

Population (2020)
  - Total: 18,447
  - Density: 2,626.7/sq mi (1,014.17/km^{2})
- Time zone: UTC-8 (Pacific)
  - Summer (DST): UTC-7 (Pacific)
- ZIP code: 97355
- Area code: 541
- FIPS code: 41-41650
- GNIS feature ID: 2410815
- Website: www.lebanonoregon.gov

Lebanon (/ˈlɛbənən/ LEB-ən-ən) is a city in Linn County, Oregon, United States. Lebanon is located in northwest Oregon, southeast of Salem. The population was 19,690 at the 2020 census. Lebanon sits beside the South Santiam River on the eastern edge of the Willamette Valley, close to the Cascade Range and a 25-minute drive to either of the larger cities of Corvallis and Albany. Lebanon is known for its foot-and-bike trails and its small-town character.

== Demographics ==
Historical population
Census	Pop.	Note	%±
1880	270		—
1890	829		207.0%
1900	922		11.2%
1910	1,820		97.4%
1920	1,805		−0.8%
1930	1,851		2.5%
1940	2,729		47.4%
1950	5,873		115.2%
1960	5,858		−0.3%
1970	6,636		13.3%
1980	10,413		56.9%
1990	10,950		5.2%
2000	12,950		18.3%
2010	15,518		19.8%
2020	18,447		18.9%

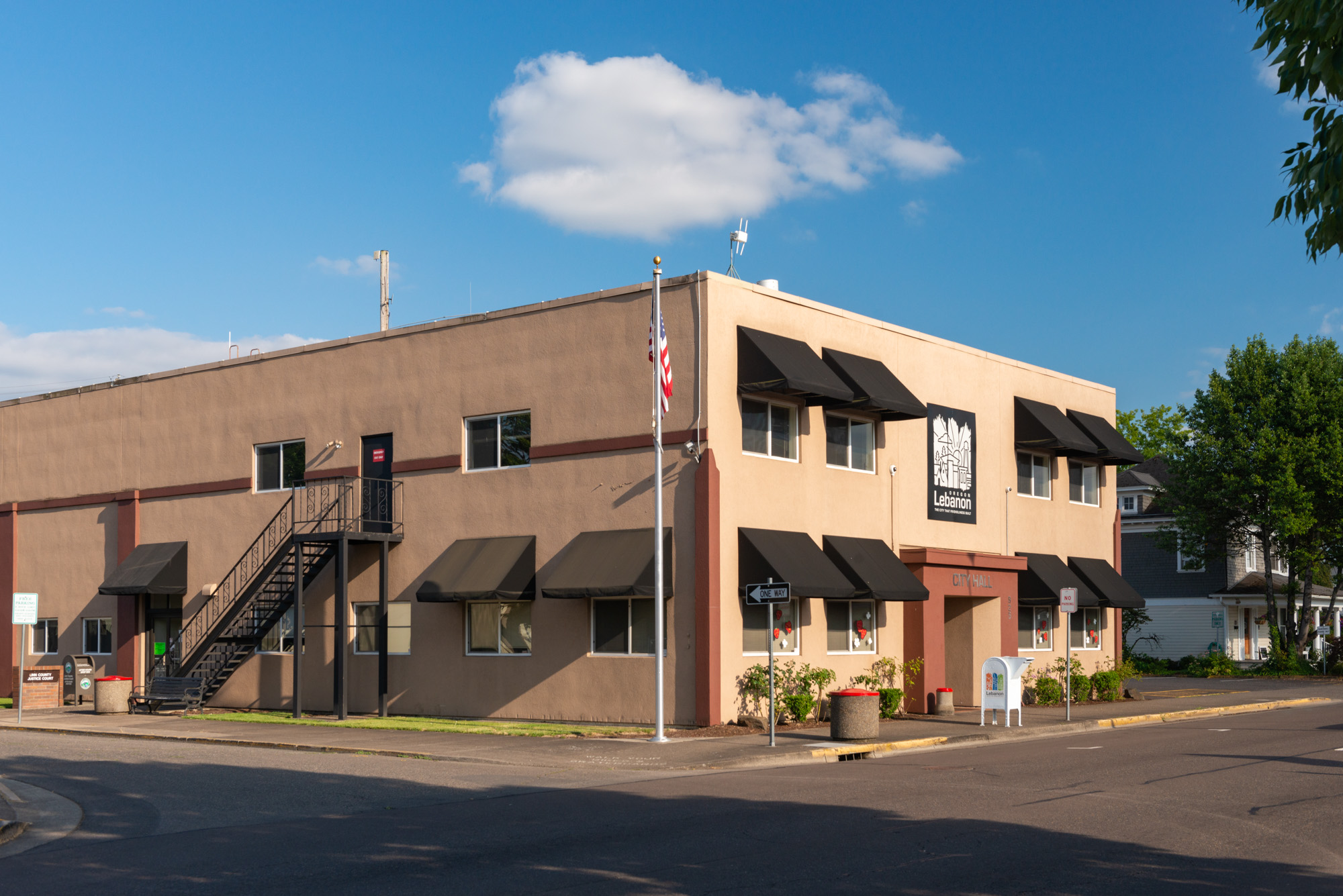
Lebanon City Hall

=== 2020 census ===
As of the 2020 census, Lebanon had a population of 18,447, resulting in a population density of 2,633 inhabitants per square mile (1,016.6/km²). The median age was 35.7 years. Of the population, 4.4% were under the age of 5, 23.1% were under the age of 18, and 18.1% were 65 years of age or older. For every 100 females there were 94.5 males, and for every 100 females age 18 and over there were 90.4 males age 18 and over.

99.2% of residents lived in urban areas, while 0.8% lived in rural areas.

There were 7,215 households in Lebanon, of which 31.6% had children under the age of 18 living in them. Of all households, 42.5% were married-couple households, 17.2% were households with a male householder and no spouse or partner present, and 29.9% were households with a female householder and no spouse or partner present. About 27.8% of all households were made up of individuals and 13.2% had someone living alone who was 65 years of age or older.

There were 7,569 housing units, of which 4.7% were vacant. Among occupied housing units, 54.6% were owner-occupied and 45.4% were renter-occupied. The homeowner vacancy rate was 1.1% and the rental vacancy rate was 4.6%.

Racial composition as of the 2020 census
Race	Number	Percent
White	15,814	85.7%
Black or African American	97	0.5%
American Indian and Alaska Native	225	1.2%
Asian	246	1.3%
Native Hawaiian and Other Pacific Islander	53	0.3%
Some other race	516	2.8%
Two or more races	1,496	8.1%
Hispanic or Latino (of any race)	1,463	7.9%

=== 2010 census ===
As of the census of 2010, there were 15,518 people, 6,118 households, and 3,945 families residing in the city. The population density was 2,326.5 inhabitants per square mile (898.3/km^{2}). There were 6,820 housing units at an average density of 1,022.5 per square mile (394.8/km^{2}). The racial makeup of the city was 91.2% White, 0.5% African American, 1.4% Native American, 1.1% Asian, 0.1% Pacific Islander, 2.1% from other races, and 3.7% from two or more races. Hispanic or Latino of any race were 5.8% of the population.

There were 6,118 households, of which 33.5% had children under the age of 18 living with them, 44.6% were married couples living together, 14.3% had a female householder with no husband present, 5.6% had a male householder with no wife present, and 35.5% were non-families. 28.5% of all households were made up of individuals, and 14.3% had someone living alone who was 65 years of age or older. The average household size was 2.50 and the average family size was 3.05.

The median age in the city was 36.6 years. 25.7% of residents were under the age of 18; 9.4% were between the ages of 18 and 24; 24.9% were from 25 to 44; 23.6% were from 45 to 64; and 16.3% were 65 years of age or older. The gender makeup of the city was 47.7% male and 52.3% female.

== Geography ==
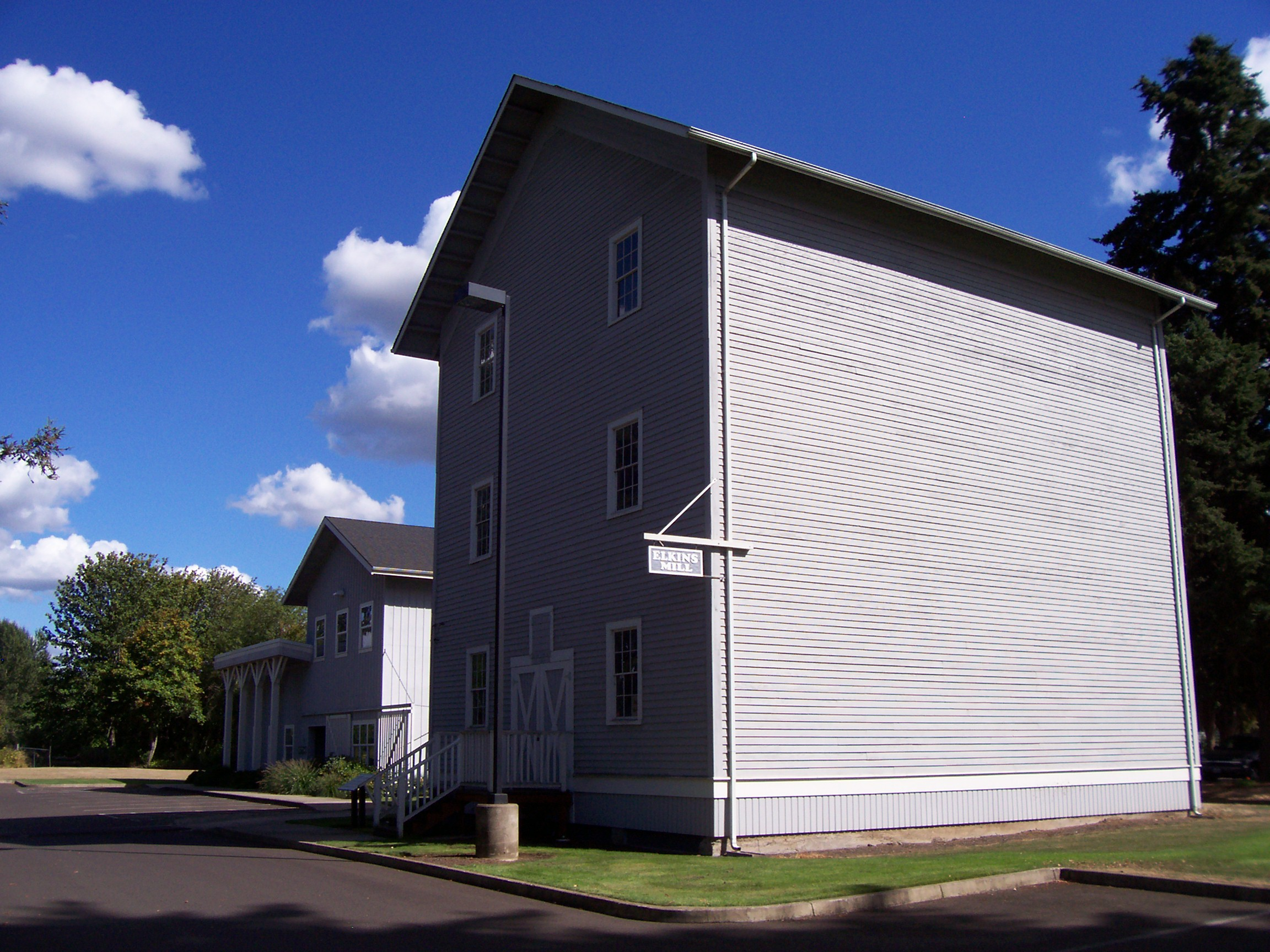
The Elkins Flour Mill is listed on the National Register of Historic Places.

According to the United States Census Bureau, the city has a total area of 6.87 square miles (17.79 km^{2}), of which 6.67 square miles (17.28 km^{2}) is land and 0.20 square miles (0.52 km^{2}) is water.

=== Climate ===
This region experiences warm (but not hot) and dry summers, with no average monthly temperatures above 71.6 °F (22.0 °C). According to the Köppen Climate Classification system, Lebanon has a warm-summer Mediterranean climate, abbreviated "Csb" on climate maps.

== Economy ==
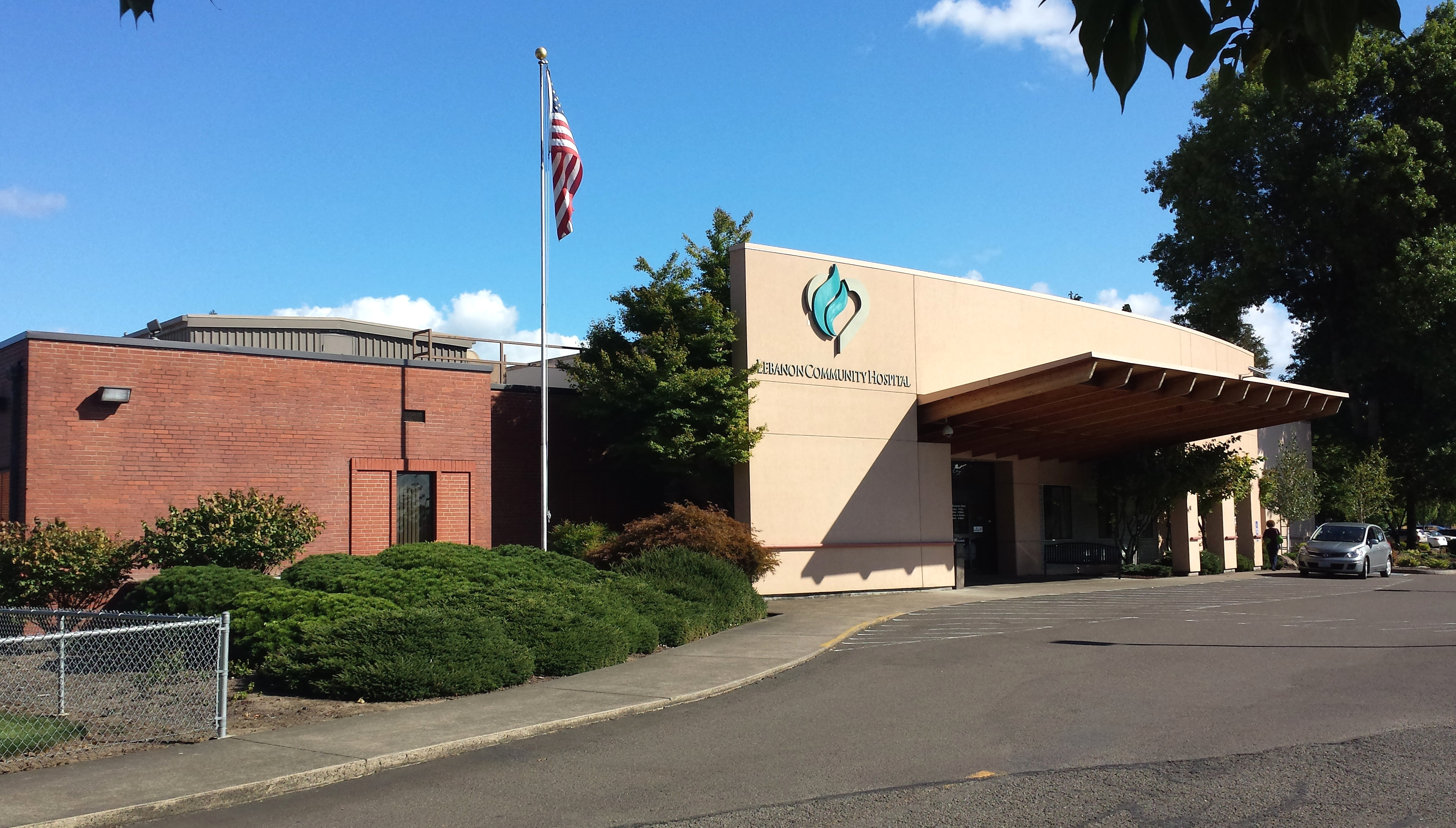
Samaritan Lebanon Community Hospital

Lowe's Regional Distribution Center is the largest employer in Lebanon, with 650 employees. The other major employers are Samaritan Lebanon Community Hospital, Lebanon Schools, Walmart, Weyerhaeuser, and Entek International.

== Education ==
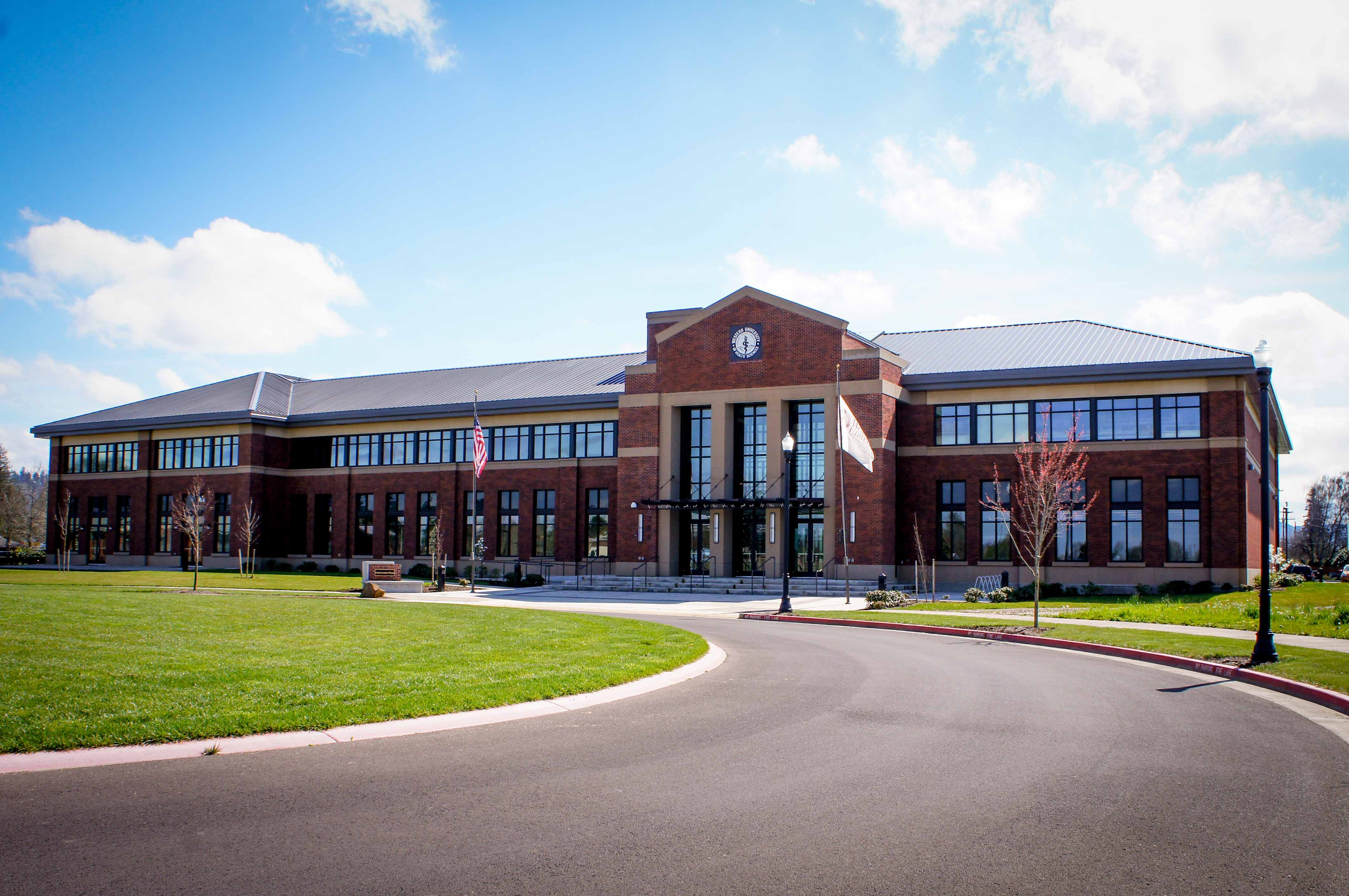
The main building for the College of Osteopathic Medicine of the Pacific, Northwest. The building first opened for classes in fall of 2011 and is located across the street from Samaritan Lebanon Community Hospital.

Lebanon is served by the Lebanon Community Schools public school district, which includes Lebanon High School. It is also home to the private East Linn Christian Academy, which serves students from preschool through twelfth grade (PreK–12).

Western University of Health Sciences opened their College of Osteopathic Medicine of the Pacific, Northwest in August 2011, the first new medical school in Oregon since Oregon Health & Science University was established. The school opened with 107 students.

In 2017, Linn–Benton Community College opened its HealthCare Occupations Center beside the osteopathic college.

In 2021, Western University of Health Sciences opened its College of Health Sciences for students of physical therapy.

== History ==
In 1845, William Hawk and Thomas Morgan built a cabin on the site of present-day Lebanon. Then in 1847, Jeremiah and Jemima Ralston bought out Hawk and Morgan's cabin and the surrounding land, and built a log house on a low rise at what is now Ralston Park. Nearby, on today's Main Street, they built a store. It soon became a stop for gold seekers on their way to California. In the following years, a village grew around the store as several other settlers moved in, taking advantage of the Donation Land Claim Act to claim land for free. They gained a post office in 1851. In 1855, the Ralstons filed a plat for the town, naming it for Jeremiah's birthplace of Lebanon, Tennessee. They also donated land for the Santiam Academy, which the Methodist Episcopal Church operated until 1906.

Lebanon was established on the land of the Louis Band of the Santiam Kalapuya. Like other Kalapuya tribes, the Santiam had dwindled in number, from malaria and other diseases contracted from fur traders, before the homesteading settlers arrived. In 1855, the band sold the U.S. government their rights to the land and moved to a temporary reservation on a claim belonging to the Ralstons' son, just south of their own. There the band awaited removal to the Grande Ronde Valley.

In 1859, local men in search of a way to drive cattle to central Oregon discovered the Santiam Pass. Soon Lebanon found itself on another essential trade route. Linn County stockmen incorporated the Willamette Valley and Cascade Mountain Road in 1864, and vacationers as well as stockmen came to rely on what came to be called the Santiam Wagon Road. This toll road was later replaced with U.S. Highway 20. The population of the town grew to 515 by 1870, with a variety of businesses and industry providing income to the community.

Transportation was often easier by water than land in the early decades of American settlement in the Willamette Valley. The South Santiam River was too shallow for large boats, so by spring 1873 Chinese workers came and began construction on a canal to carry barges laden with goods between Lebanon and Albany. However, the water flowed too fast for upstream shipping, and the coming of the railroad curtailed downstream shipping. Today, the canal is still in use, running through Lebanon backyards to provide water for the people of Albany.

Railroads helped Lebanon provide its goods not only to Albany, but also to the rest of the world. The Albany–Lebanon Railroad, completed in 1880, was a branch of the Oregon and California Railroad's north–south line through Albany. The Southern Pacific eventually took over these lines and, in 1910, rerouted the old Oregonian line through Lebanon.

From the 1890s on, a great variety of farming and food-processing industries flourished in the area. Eastern Oregon came to dominate in wheat growing, but Lebanon-area farmers produced orchard fruits, berries, walnuts, filberts, hops, flax, vegetables, forage crops, turkeys, mohair, honey, and flowers for florists. Lebanon had a cheese factory, a creamery, potato warehouses, a cannery, and prune and nut driers. In the 1920s, the local grass-seed industry got its start, and by the 1930s Linn County was the leading county in grass-seed production in the United States.

Lebanon's most celebrated crop has been strawberries. By 1907, Lebanon was one of the leading strawberry-growing areas in the Willamette Valley. Lebanon's Strawberry Festival – featuring, since 1931, "the World's Largest Strawberry Shortcake" – has been an annual event since 1909. As of 2020, however, only one local strawberry field remains.

The local wood-products industry began to grow around 1900, which the supply of timber in the upper Midwest declined. The industry began to boom when the Oregon and Electric Railroad was completed in 1932. New sawmills were built along the line in town as well as in the mountains. From 1937 to 1942, twenty new mills opened in the city; they made a great variety of wood products. The paper mill, which had originally made paper from wheat straw, doubled in size in 1936 to process logs that were floated down the South Santiam River. The local population swelled, and the Great Depression had little effect on the city.

In 1940, a still greater boom began. That year, Evans Products built what was purported to be the biggest plywood mill in the world. "Evansville" became a station on the Oregon and Electric line. World War II increased the demand for plywood, and women took men's places in the mill. From 1940 to 1950, Lebanon's population grew by 115 percent.

In 1952, the plywood plant, now called Cascade Plywood, began producing Lebanite, a hard composite board. Lebanon residents began calling themselves Lebanites. Cascade Plywood came to dominate Lebanon's economy.

Lebanon's economy began a slow decline in the 1970s. As overharvesting in the nearby forests made timber extraction more expensive, the mills began closing. Lebanon's paper mill closed in 1980, the plywood mill in 1984, and the Lebanite hardwood plant in 2004. Weyerhaeuser shut down the last of the big mills in 2006 and 2007. Unemployment rose, and Main Street storefronts were left empty.

In the twenty-first century, the city's economy has improved. The openings of the College of Osteopathic Medicine of the Pacific Northwest, in 2011, the Edward C. Allworth Veterans' Home, in 2017, and Linn–Benton Community College's HealthCare Occupations Center, in 2017, have sparked growth. Weyerhaeuser opened the state-of-the-art Santiam Lumber sawmill in 2008, one year after closing down the old Bauman sawmill. Main Street storefronts and old houses are being renovated, and brewpubs, bakeries, and other new businesses are thriving.

== Arts and culture ==
Lebanon hosts an annual Strawberry Festival in the first weekend of June. Historically, strawberry farms were economically important to the area. The first festival was held in 1909 and it has been celebrated nearly every year since. A main feature of the festival is the "World's Largest Strawberry Shortcake". The Strawberry Festival includes a Junior Parade, a Grand Parade (featuring the Strawberry Royalty Court), and a fair with food, carnival rides and musical entertainment. The Strawberry Court is composed of five local high school students (Princesses), one of whom is selected to be the Strawberry Queen. The Court serve as local ambassadors for the community and in return receive scholarships to further their education.

== Recreation ==
The city has 15 developed parks, totaling 71.5 acres (28.9 ha), which provide residents with baseball, softball, and soccer fields, as well as playgrounds, basketball and tennis courts, and other resources. Gills Landing has a boat ramp and dock, as well as an RV park, camping area, and showers. Ralston Park hosts the town's Christmas tree and yearly lighting celebration.

The Willamette Speedway is a racecar track located in Lebanon. It became an official NASCAR-sanctioned speedway in 2026.

A local nonprofit organization, Build Lebanon Trails, is working with the city government to build more than fifty miles (80 km) of walking and biking trails in Lebanon.

== Notable people ==
- Frederic Homer Balch (1861-1891), American writer
- David W. Ballard (1824–1875), governor of Idaho Territory
- Carson "Skeeter" Bigbee (1895–1964), professional baseball outfielder
- Eric Castle (1970–), former NFL safety and special teams player for the San Diego Chargers
- Jo Collins (1945–2010), actress and 1965 Playmate of the Year
- Warren C. Gill (1912–1987), Coast Guard veteran, Oregon State Representative and State Senator
- Howard Hesseman (1940–2022), actor
- Ben Howland (1957–), college basketball coach
- Pat McQuistan (1983–), offensive lineman for the Arizona Cardinals
- Paul McQuistan (1983–), offensive lineman for the Seattle Seahawks
- Tom Medley (1920–2014), cartoonist (creator of Stroker McGurk) and magazine editor
- Michael Merzenich (1942–), world-renowned neuroscientist
- Katherine Ann Power (1949–), former fugitive for manslaughter and armed robbery
- Doug Riesenberg (1965–), former NFL offensive tackle
- Dave Roberts (1951–), MLB third baseman
- Mike Royer (1941–), comic book artist at Marvel and DC Comics
- Dick Smith (1939–2012), MLB outfielder and first baseman
- Xxlayna Marie (2000-), Adult film star
