= AVN Award for Female Foreign Performer of the Year =

Adult film award

- Awarded for: Female Foreign Performer of the Year
- Country: United States
- Presented by: AVN Media Network
- First award: 2003
- Currently held by: Eve Sweet
- Website: avnawards.avn.com

The AVN Award for Female Foreign Performer of the Year is an award that has been given by sex industry company AVN since the award's inception in 2003. French-born actresses Katsuni and Anissa Kate and Czech-born actress Little Caprice have each won the award three times, while Hungarian-born Aleska Diamond, Polish-born Misha Cross, and Romanian-born Eve Sweet have each won the award twice.

As of January 2025, the titleholder is Eve Sweet.

== Winners and nominees ==
=== 2000s ===
Year	Photo	Winner	Nominees
2003		Rita Faltoyano (Hungary)	Zora Banks; Lea De Mae; Sophie Evans; Jana; Daniella Rush
2004		Mandy Bright (Hungary)	Mélanie Coste; Wanda Kurtis; Sophie Evans; Rita Faltoyano; Katja Kassin; Katsuni; Lucy Lee; Anna Nova; Alicia Rhodes; Stacy Silver; Monica Sweetheart; Michelle Wild
2005		Katsuni (France)	Cristina Bella; Niki Belucci; Mandy Bright; Mélanie Coste; Jane Darling; Rita Faltoyano; Aneta Keys; Cindy Lords; Sandra Romain; Julie Silver; Liliane Tiger
2006		Katsuni (France)	Sharka Blue; Mandy Bright; Brigitta Bulgari; Angel Dark; Rita Faltoyano; Tera Joy; Alicia Rhodes; Julie Silver; Stacy Silver; Barbara Summer; Liliane Tiger
2007		Katsuni (France)	Cristina Bella; Mandy Bright; Angel Dark; Jane Darling; Mya Diamond; Tiffany Hopkins; Isabel Ice; Claudia Jamsson; Cindy Lords; Monica Mattos; Poppy Morgan; Claudia Rossi; Priscila Sol; Liliane Tiger
2008		Monica Mattos (Brazil)	Baroka Balls; Nikky Blond; Caylian Curtis; Suzie Diamond; Diana Doll; Clara G Isabel Ice; Melissa Lauren; Divinity Love; Oksana; Nikki Rider; Liliane Tiger; Tarra White; Yasmine
2009		Eve Angel (Hungary)	Black Angelika; Bambi; Chloe Delaure; Dian Doll; Regina Ice; Melissa Lauren; Loona Luxx; Roxy Panther; Peaches; Claudia Rossi; Viva Style; Cecilia Vega; Tarra White; Yasmine

=== 2010s ===
Year	Photo	Winner	Nominees
2010		Aletta Ocean (Hungary)	Blue Angel; Stella DelCroix; Cindy Hope; Regina Ice; Jodie James; Cherry Jul; Melissa Lauren; Madison Parker; Anita Pearl; Monica Santhiago; Sofia Valentine; Cecilia Vega; Tarra White; Yasmine
2011		Angel Dark (Slovakia)	Aliz; Blue Angel; Jenny Baby; Black Angelika; Lou Charmelle; Carla Cox; Mandy Dee; Aleska Diamond; Cindy Hope; Lea Lexis; Kerry Louise; Natasha Marley; Jessica Moore; Tarra White
2012		Aleska Diamond (Hungary)	Blue Angel; Black Angelika; Lou Charmelle; Liza Del Sierra; Cindy Dollar; Eufrat; Cathy Heaven; Franceska Jaimes; Gemma Massey; Aletta Ocean; Anna Polina; Jessie Volt; Tarra White; Zafira
2013		Aleska Diamond (Hungary)	Aliz; Black Angelika; Claire Castel; Carla Cox; Laura Crystal; Franceska Jaimes; Anissa Kate; Jenna Lovely; Aletta Ocean; Anna Polina; Ivana Sugar; Paige Turnah; Jessie Volt; Tarra White
2014		Anissa Kate (France)	Nikita Bellucci; Samantha Bentley; Claire Castel; Ava Dalush; Tiffany Doll; Marica Hase; Henessy; Cindy Hope; Jasmine Jae; Cayenne Klein; Valentina Nappi; Lyen Parker; Anna Polina; Ivana Sugar
2015		Anissa Kate (France)	Abbie Cat; Samantha Bentley; Alexis Crystal; Tiffany Doll; Gina Gerson; Cathy Heaven; Henessy; Jasmine Jae; Francesca Jaimes; Lola Reve; Ivana Sugar; Mira Sunset; Lola Taylor; Charlize Tinkerbell
2016		Misha Cross (Poland)	Samantha Bentley; Stella Cox; Alexis Crystal; Sienna Day; Tiffany Doll; Tina Hot; Jasmine Jae; Franceska Jaimes; Anissa Kate; Manon Martin; Mea Melone; Amarna Miller; Lola Reve; Taylor Sands
2017		Misha Cross (Poland)	Amirah Adara; Samantha Bentley; Claire Castel; Stella Cox; Sienna Day; Tiffany Doll; Lea Guerlin; Jasmine Jae; Ines Lenvin; Lexi Lowe; Amarna Miller; Anna Polina; Nekane Sweet; Alexa Tomas
2018		Jasmine Jae (United Kingdom)	Amirah Adara; Nikita Bellucci; Misha Cross; Eveline Dellai; Susy Gala; Gina Gerson; Anissa Kate; Cherry Kiss; Apolonia Lapiedra; Amarna Miller; Anna Polina; Valentina Ricci; Julia Roca; Alexa Tomas
2019		Anissa Kate (France)	Amirah Adara; Little Caprice; Misha Cross; Cassie del Isla; Clea Gaultier; Ella Hughes; Gina Gerson; Jasmine Jae; Tina Kay; Alyssia Kent; Cherry Kiss; Apolonia Lapiedra; Texas Patti; Tiffany Tatum

=== 2020s ===
Year	Photo	Winner	Nominees
2020		Little Caprice (Czech Republic)	Amirah Adara; Misha Cross; Anna de Ville; Lady Dee; Cassie del Isla; Clea Gaultier; Lucy Heart; Apolonia Lapiedra; Anissa Kate; Tina Kay; Cherry Kiss; Barbie Sins; Tiffany Tatum; Rebecca Volpetti
2021		Clea Gaultier (France)	Little Caprice; Alexis Crystal; Anna de Ville; Cassie Del Isla; Angelika Grays; Jasmine Jae; Anissa Kate; Tina Kay; Nelly Kent; Cherry Kiss; Jia Lissa; Liya Silver; Sybil; Tiffany Tatum
2022		Little Caprice (Czech Republic)	Ginebra Bellucci; Anna de Ville; Cassie del Isla; Clea Gaultier; Angelika Grays; Tina Kay; Cherry Kiss; Jia Lissa; Baby Nicols; Kaisa Nord; Liya Silver; Sybil; Rebecca Volpetti; Zaawaadi
2023		Little Caprice (Czech Republic)	Alexis Crystal; Anna de Ville; Shalina Devine; Eva Elfie; Clea Gaultier; Romy Indy; Eden Ivy; Cherry Kiss; Veronica Leal; Rae Lil Black; Jia Lissa; Clara Mia; Liya Silver; Sybil
2024		Cherry Kiss (Serbia)	Little Caprice; Kelly Collins; Alexis Crystal; Anna de Ville; Shalina Devine; Eden Ivy; Scarlett Jones; Catherine Knight; Geisha Kyd; Veronica Leal; Clara Mia; Tiffany Tatum; Christy White; Zaawaadi
2025		Eve Sweet (Romania)	Amirah Adara; Little Caprice; Kelly Collins; Anna de Ville; Eden Ivy; Jadilica; Catherine Knight; Veronica Leal; Lia Lin; Clara Mia; Tiffany Tatum; Agatha Vega; Christy White; Zaawaadi
2026		Eve Sweet (Romania)	Amirah Adara; Cherry Candle; Little Caprice; Alexis Crystal; Amalia Davis; Anna de Ville; Shalina Devine; Eden Ivy; Jadilica; Catherine Knight; Lia Lin; Matty Mila Perez; Martina Smeraldi; Tiffany Tatum
2027			Amirah Adara; Clemence Audiard; Milan Cheek; Amalia Davis; Anna de Ville; Sabien DeMonia; Shalina Devine; Britney Dutch; Catherine Knight; Lia Lin; Clara Mia; Matty Mila Perez; Emily Pink; Audrey Reid; Agatha Vaga

Country of origin	Titles	Number of performers
France	7	3
Hungary	6	5
Czech Republic	3	1
Poland	2	1
Romania	2	1
Brazil	1	1
Slovakia	1	1
United Kingdom	1	1
Serbia	1	1

== Multiple wins and nominations ==
=== Multiple wins ===
Wins	Performer	Years
3	Katsuni	2005, 2006, 2007
3	Anissa Kate	2014, 2015, 2019
3	Little Caprice	2020, 2022, 2023
2	Aleska Diamond	2012, 2013
2	Misha Cross	2016, 2017
2	Eve Sweet	2025, 2026

=== Three or more nominations ===
Nominations	Performer	Years
8	Anissa Kate	2013, 2014, 2015, 2016, 2018, 2019, 2020, 2021
8	Little Caprice	2019, 2020, 2021, 2022, 2023, 2024, 2025, 2026
8	Anna de Ville	2020, 2021, 2022, 2023, 2024, 2025, 2026, 2027
7	Jasmine Jae	2014, 2015, 2016, 2017, 2018, 2019, 2021
7	Cherry Kiss	2018, 2019, 2020, 2021, 2022, 2023, 2024
7	Amirah Adara	2017, 2018, 2019, 2020, 2025, 2026, 2027
6	Tarra White	2008, 2009, 2010, 2011, 2012, 2013
6	Alexis Crystal	2015, 2016, 2021, 2023, 2024, 2026
6	Tiffany Tatum	2019, 2020, 2021, 2024, 2025, 2026
5	Anna Polina	2012, 2013, 2014, 2017, 2018
5	Misha Cross	2016, 2017, 2018, 2019, 2020
5	Clea Gaultier	2019, 2020, 2021, 2022, 2023
4	Rita Faltoyano	2003, 2004, 2005, 2006
4	Katsuni	2004, 2005, 2006, 2007
4	Mandy Bright	2004, 2005, 2006, 2007
4	Liliane Tiger	2005, 2006, 2007, 2008
4	Black Angelika	2009, 2011, 2012, 2013
4	Franceska Jaimes	2012, 2013, 2015, 2016
4	Samantha Bentley	2014, 2015, 2016, 2017
4	Tiffany Doll	2014, 2015, 2016, 2017
4	Cassie del Isla	2019, 2020, 2021, 2022
4	Tina Kay	2019, 2020, 2021, 2022
4	Eden Ivy	2023, 2024, 2025, 2026
4	Clara Mia	2023, 2024, 2025, 2027
4	Shalina Devine	2023, 2024, 2026, 2027
4	Catherine Knight	2024, 2025, 2026, 2027
3	Melissa Lauren	2008, 2009, 2010
3	Yasmine	2008, 2009, 2010
3	Angel Dark	2006, 2007, 2011
3	Blue Angel	2010, 2011, 2012
3	Aletta Ocean	2010, 2012, 2013
3	Aleska Diamond	2011, 2012, 2013
3	Cindy Hope	2010, 2011, 2014
3	Ivana Sugar	2013, 2014, 2015
3	Claire Castel	2013, 2014, 2017
3	Amarna Miller	2016, 2017, 2018
3	Gina Gerson	2015, 2018, 2019
3	Apolonia Lapiedra	2018, 2019, 2020
3	Jia Lissa	2021, 2022, 2023
3	Liya Silver	2021, 2022, 2023
3	Sybil	2021, 2022, 2023
3	Zaawaadi	2022, 2024, 2025
3	Veronica Leal	2023, 2024, 2025
3	Lia Lin	2025, 2026, 2027

== See also ==
- AVN Award for Male Foreign Performer of the Year
