= 30th AVN Awards =

US adult industry award ceremony in 2013

- Date: January 19, 2013
- Site: The Joint; Hard Rock Hotel and Casino, Paradise, Nevada
- Hosted by: April Macie; Asa Akira; Jesse Jane
- Preshow hosts: Kirsten Price; Chanel Preston; Misty Stone; Alexis Texas; Evan Stone
- Directed by: Gary D. Miller

Highlights
- Best Picture: Wasteland
- Most awards: Wasteland (7)
- Most nominations: Star Wars XXX: A Porn Parody (20)

Television coverage
- Network: Showtime
- Duration: 1 hour, 20 minutes

The 30th AVN Awards ceremony, or XXX AVN Awards, was an event during which Adult Video News (AVN) presented its annual AVN Awards to honor the best pornographic movies and adult entertainment products of 2012. Movies or products released between October 1, 2011, and September 30, 2012, were eligible. The ceremony was held on January 19, 2013, at The Joint in the Hard Rock Hotel and Casino, Paradise, Nevada. Comedian April Macie, AVN Hall of Fame inductee Jesse Jane and Asa Akira, who won Female Performer of the Year, hosted the AVN Awards. The awards show was held immediately after the Adult Entertainment Expo at the same venue.

Best Romance Release was one of several new categories created for the 30th Awards Show. The new categories "reflect the ever-evolving market trends of the business" and the Best Romance award is for a movie with a romantic story line geared specifically to women or couples. Torn, starring best actor winner Steven St. Croix, won the first Best Romance award.

Wasteland took top honors as Movie of the Year, also winning best drama and six other awards, including a directing award for Graham Travis, who also directed the previous year's top movie, and a Best Actress victory for Lily Carter. Star Wars XXX: A Porn Parody took six awards including Best Parody – Comedy.

Octomom Home Alone won the Best Celebrity Sex Tape category, while Axel Braun won his third straight Director of the Year award and Remy LaCroix won the AVN Best New Starlet Award. All winners were presented newly redesigned trophies, depicting an intertwined couple, to celebrate the awards' 30th anniversary.

== Winners and nominees ==
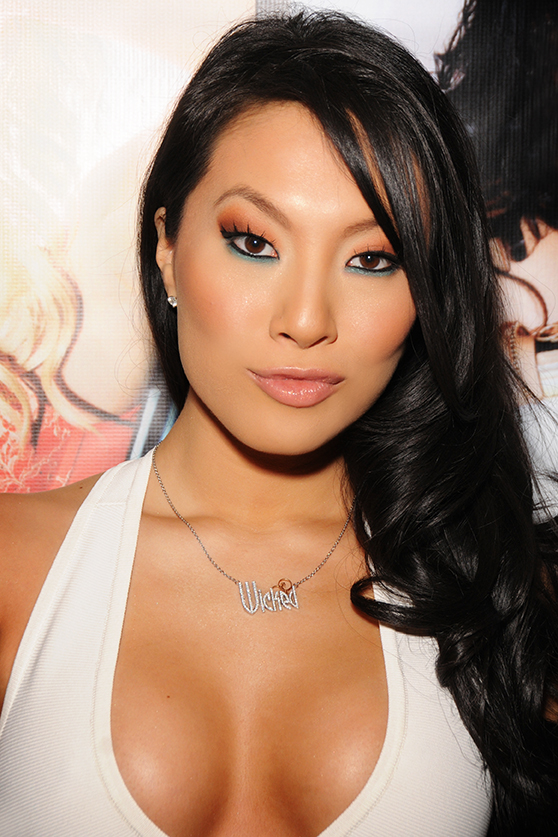
Asa Akira, winner of the 2013 AVN Female Performer of the Year Award

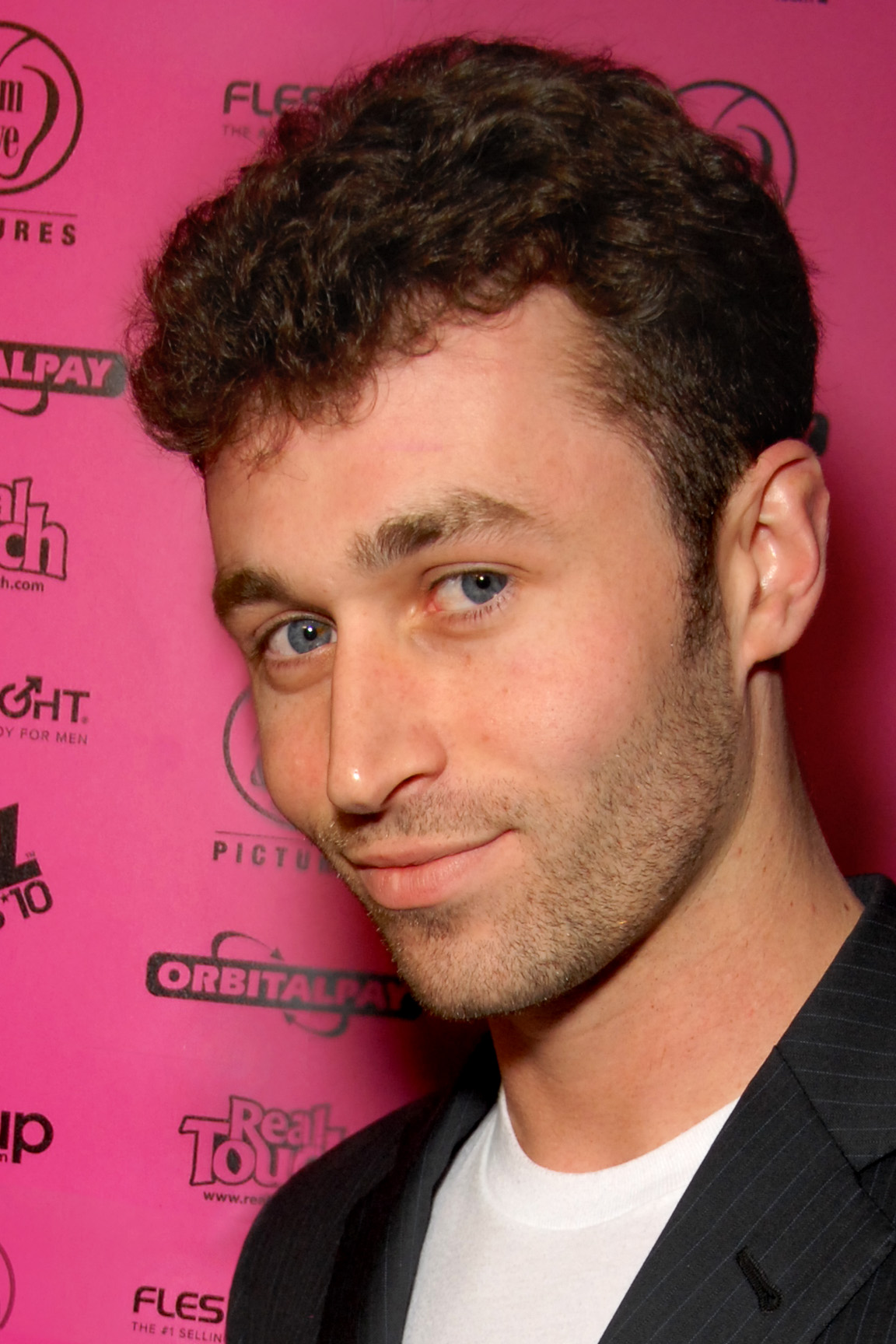
James Deen, winner of the 2013 Male Performer of the Year

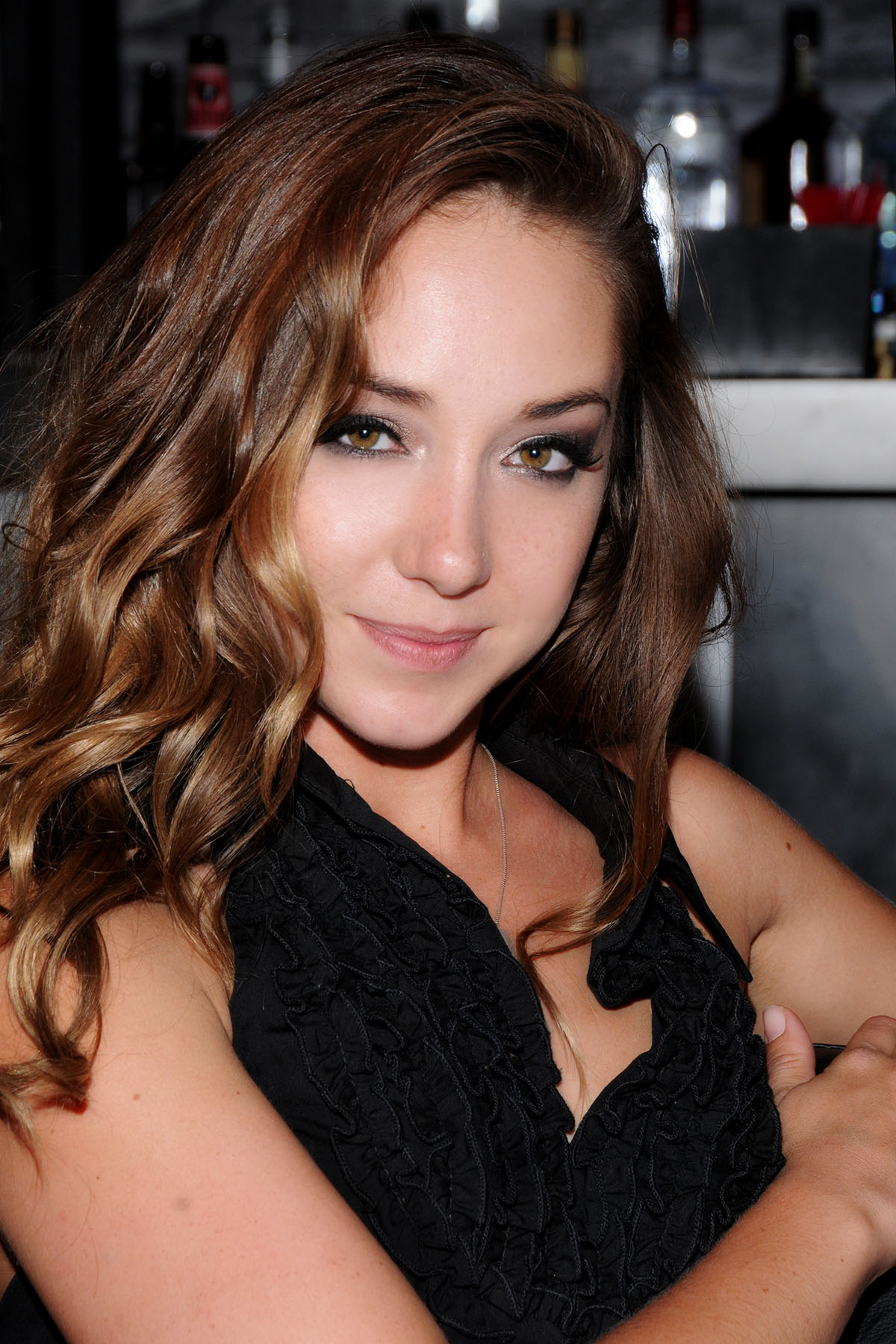
Remy LaCroix, winner of the 2013 Best New Starlet

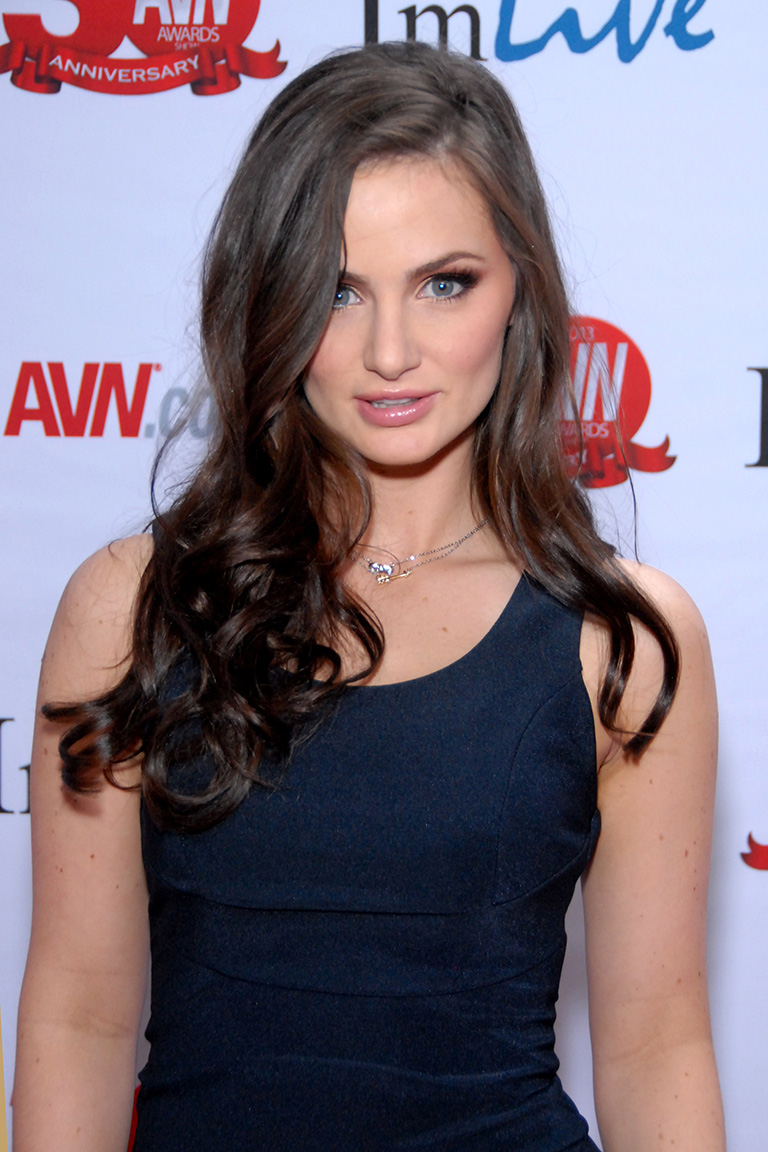
Lily Carter, winner of the 2013 Best Actress

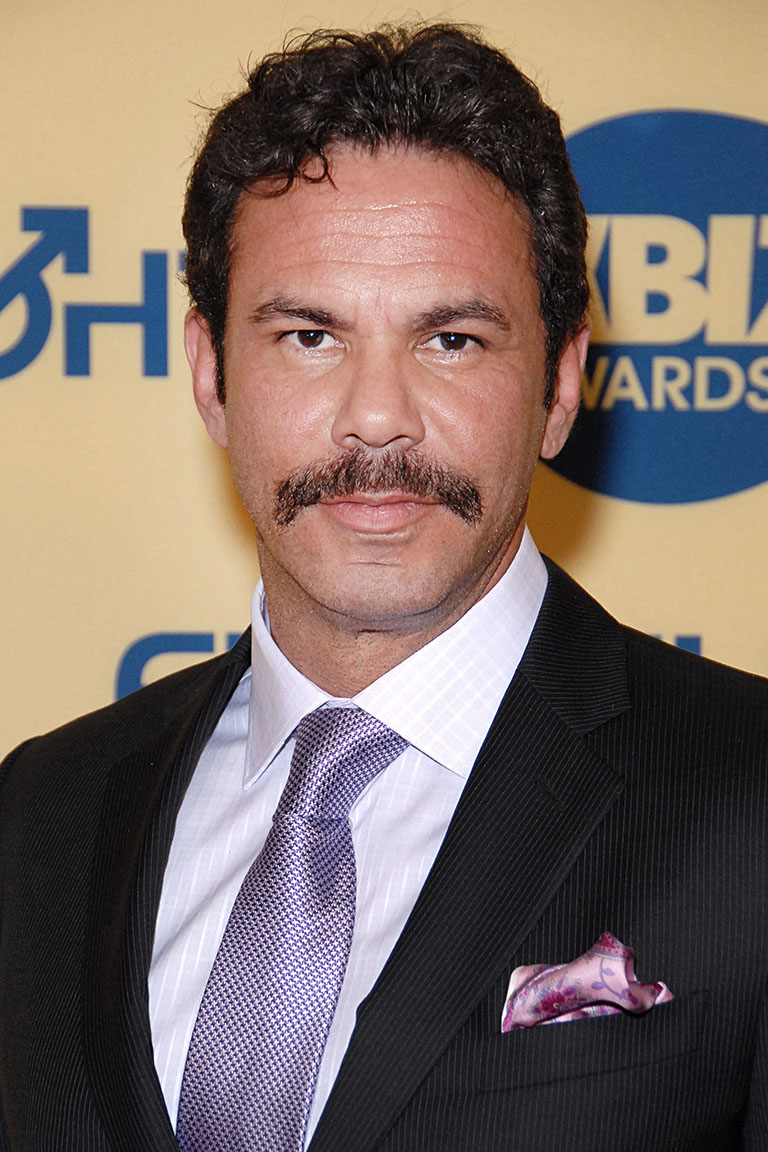
Steven St. Croix, winner of the 2013 Best Actor

The nominees for the 30th AVN Awards were announced on November 30, 2012.

=== Major awards ===
Winners of categories announced during the awards ceremony January 19, 2013, are highlighted in boldface.

Movie of the Year^{A}	Female Performer of the Year
Oil Overload 7 (Best All-Sex Release); Nurses 2 (Best Comedy); Ass Trapped Undercover (Best Foreign Feature); Star Wars XXX: A Porn Parody (Best Parody - Comedy); Spartacus MMXII: The Beginning (Best Parody - Drama); Torn (Best Romance Movie); Asa Akira to the Limit (Best Star Showcase); Slutty and Sluttier 16 (Best Vignette Release); Best New Starlets 2012 (Best Wall-to-Wall Release)	**Asa Akira**; Jessie Andrews; Eva Angelina; Lexi Belle; Lily Carter; Dana DeArmond; Skin Diamond; Gracie Glam; Allie Haze; Kayden Kross; Lily Labeau; Brooklyn Lee; Chanel Preston; Kristina Rose; Samantha Saint; Andy San Dimas; Bobbi Starr; Jada Stevens; Misty Stone; Alexis Texas
Male Performer of the Year	Transsexual Performer of the Year
**James Deen**; Mike Adriano; Mick Blue; Xander Corvus; Erik Everhard; Manuel Ferrara; Keiran Lee; Mandingo; Ramón Nomar; Mr. Pete; Tommy Pistol; Toni Ribas; Evan Stone; Nacho Vidal; Prince Yahshua	**Vaniity**; Celeste; Amy Daly; Danni Daniels; Jessica Fox; Joanna Jet; Eva Lin; Venus Lux; Sunshyne Monroe; Aly Sinclair; Brittany St. Jordan; Tiffany Starr; Wendy Summers; Sarina Valentina; Wendy Williams
Director of the Year	Best New Starlet
**Axel Braun**; Mike Adriano; Joanna Angel; Brad Armstrong; Mick Blue; Ettore Buchi; Jessica Drake; William H.; Jules Jordan; Mason; Lee Roy Myers; Eddie Powell; Jim Powers; Joey Silvera; Bobbi Starr	**Remy LaCroix**; Anikka Albrite; Dani Daniels; Ana Foxxx; Kendall Karson; Tessa Lane; Leilani Leeane; Adrianna Luna; Melina Mason; Cassandra Nix; Maddy O'Reilly; Penny Pax; Riley Reid; Rihanna Rimes; Jessie Rogers; Bonnie Rotten; Stevie Shae; Siri; Trinity St. Clair; Christie Stevens; Karina White
Best Actor	Best Actress
**Steven St. Croix - Torn**; Richie Calhoun - Diary of Love; Xander Corvus - Immortal Love; Dane Cross - A Mother's Love; Richie Deville - My Mother's Best Friend 6; Giovanni Francesco - The Dark Knight XXX: A Porn Parody; Seth Gamble - Star Wars XXX: A Porn Parody; Marcus London - Spartacus MMXII: The Beginning; Eric Masterson - Dallas XXX: A Parody; Brendon Miller - Happy Endings; Tommy Pistol - Pee-Wee's XXX Adventure: A Porn Parody; Anthony Rosano - The Friend Zone; Randy Spears - Men in Black: A Hardcore Parody; Evan Stone - Mork & Mindy: A DreamZone Parody; Jack Vegas - Blow	Nyomi Banxxx - Training Day: A Pleasure Dynasty Parody; Alektra Blue - Next Friday Night; Gracie Glam - Happy Endings; Presley Hart - Diary of Love; Allie Haze - Star Wars XXX: A Porn Parody; Lily Labeau - Wasteland; Remy LaCroix - Torn; Brooklyn Lee - Voracious: The First Season; Kaylani Lei - Snatched; Natasha Nice - Love Is a Dangerous Game; Chanel Preston - Romeo & Juliet: A DreamZone Parody; Andy San Dimas - Café Amore; Bobbi Starr - The Truth About O; India Summer - The Graduate XXX: A Paul Thomas Parody
Best Foreign Feature	Best Drama
**Ass Trapped Undercover**; The Bodyguard; Inglorious Bitches; The Journalist; Man Trap: Apply Within; A Million Dollar Hoax; The Nightmare of...; Seriel Fucker	Black Scary Movie; Blow; The Con Job; Countdown; The Four; In Her Head; Legal Appeal; A Mother's Love; Mothers & Daughters; My Mother's Best Friend 6; One Night in the Valley; The Truth About O; The Valley; Voracious: The First Season
Best Parody - Comedy	Best Parody - Drama
**Star Wars XXX: A Porn Parody**; The Addams Family XXX; Brazzers Presents: The Parodies 2; Buffy the Vampire Slayer XXX: A Parody; El Gordo y La Flaca XXX; Family Guy: The XXX Parody; Fuckenstein; Godfather: A DreamZone Parody; Men in Black: A Hardcore Parody; Mork & Mindy: A DreamZone Parody; Not Animal House XXX; Not The Three Stooges XXX; Official The Hangover Parody; Pee-Wee's XXX Adventure: A Porn Parody; This Ain't The Expendables XXX 3D	**Spartacus MMXII: The Beginning**; Birds of Prey XXX: A Sinister Comixxx Parody; Dallas XXX: A Parody; The Dark Knight XXX: A Porn Parody; Diary of Love; The Graduate XXX: A Paul Thomas Parody; Iron Man XXX: An Extreme Comixxx Parody; Last Tango; Official Scarface Parody; Romeo & Juliet: A DreamZone Parody; This Ain't Avatar 2 XXX 3D: Escape From Pandwhora; This Ain't Jaws XXX 3D; Tomb Raider XXX: An Exquisite Films Parody; Training Day: A Pleasure Dynasty Parody; Zorro XXX: A Pleasure Dynasty Parody
Best Star Showcase	Best Romance Release
**Asa Akira to the Limit**; Alexis Ford Darkside; Bobbi Loves Boys; Chanel Preston: No Limits; Dani Daniels Dare; Jada Stevens Is Buttwoman; The Insatiable Miss Saint; Jessie Rogers: Unbreakable; Kristina Rose: Unfiltered; Lexi; Lily Carter Is Irresistible; Lisa Ann: Fantasy Girl; Meet Bonnie; Remy; Ultimate Fuck Toy: Riley Reid	**Torn**; Brave Hearts; Cafe Amore; Color of Love; Forever Love Trust; The Friend Zone; Happy Endings; Immortal Love; Love or Lust; Love, Marriage & Other Bad Ideas; A Mother's Love; Overnight; Shared Wives; Tango to Romance; Voila
Best Anal Sex Scene	Best Oral Sex Scene
**Brooklyn Lee, Manuel Ferrara - Oil Overload 7**; Asa Akira, Keiran Lee - Real Wife Stories Presents Asa Akira – Say Hi to Your Husband for Me; Veronica Avluv, Manuel Ferrara - Oil Overload 7; Lexi Belle, James Deen - Lexi; Lily Carter, Mick Blue - Best New Starlets 2012; Charley Chase, Manuel Ferrara - Big Wet Asses 21; Skin Diamond, Nacho Vidal - Nacho Vidal: The Sexual Messiah; Alexis Ford, Lexington Steele - Alexis Ford Darkside; Franceska Jaimes, Manuel Ferrara - Big Wet Butts 6; Kagney Linn Karter, Prince Yahshua - Prince the Penetrator; Chanel Preston, Nacho Vidal - Nacho Vidal: The Sexual Messiah 2; Kristina Rose, Michael Stefano - Kristina Rose: Unfiltered; Bobbi Starr, Toni Ribas - Slutty and Sluttier 15; Jada Stevens, Mick Blue - Big Wet Asses 20; Jennifer White, Tom Byron - Star Wars XXX: A Porn Parody	**Lexi Belle - Massive Facials 4**; Jessie Andrews, Cassandra Nix - Filthy Cocksucking Auditions; Alexis Ford - Alexis Ford Darkside; Havana Ginger, Ice La Fox - Rack City XXX; Allie Haze - Star Wars XXX: A Porn Parody; Kimberly Kane - This Ain't The Expendables XXX 3D; Remy LaCroix - Massive Facials 5; Ashlynn Leigh - Massive Facials 5; Kristina Rose - Spit; Samantha Saint - The Insatiable Miss Saint; Katie St. Ives - The Valley; Sarah Shevon - Let Me Suck You 3; Heather Starlet - Let Me Suck You 3; Bobbi Starr - Spit
Best Boy/Girl Sex Scene	Best Sex Scene in a Foreign-Shot Production
**Nacho Vidal, Alexis Ford - Alexis Ford Darkside**; James Deen, Kayden Kross - The Con Job; Erik Everhard, Lily Carter - Sport Fucking 9; Erik Everhard, Dani Daniels - Dani Daniels Dare; Manuel Ferrara, Gracie Glam - US Sluts 3; Manuel Ferrara, Karlie Montana - Nerdy Girls; Manuel Ferrara, Maddy O'Reilly - Young & Glamorous 3; Giovanni Francesco, Aiden Ashley - The Dark Knight XXX: A Porn Parody; Tommy Pistol, Chanel Preston - The Valley; Steven St. Croix, Remy LaCroix - Torn; Lexington Steele, Allie Haze - Massive Asses 6; Michael Stefano, Lexi Belle - Performers of the Year 2012; Michael Stefano, Alexis Texas - D3viance; Voodoo, Riley Reid - Ultimate Fuck Toy: Riley Reid; Voodoo, Samantha Saint - The Insatiable Miss Saint	**Bibi Noel, Mira, Rocco Siffredi - Aliz Loves Rocco**; Cindy Hope, Jessie Volt, Candy Alexa, Abbie Cat, Barbie White, Aliz, Bibi Noel, Jessica, Bellina, Victoria Tiffani, Keiran Lee, Scott Nails - Brazzers Worldwide: Budapest; Brooklyn Lee, LouLou, Danny D. - Brooklyn Lee: Nymphomaniac; Anissa Kate, Ian Scott, Omar - Den of Depravity; Franceska Jaimes, Nacho Vidal (scene 2) - Fucking Tour; Lea Lexis, Nick Lang, Mugur - In Anal Sluts We Trust 4; Aleska Diamond, Anastasia Devine, Anna Polina, Cindy Dollar, Defrancesca Gallardo, Katy, Nataly, Jenna Lovely, Lucy Bell, Niki Sweet, Silvie De Lux, Suzie Carina, Valleria, Pavel Matous, George Uhl, Marcio Gonzales, Leny Ewil, Steve Q., J. J. - Inglorious Bitches; Lucie Love, Kai Taylor - J’Adore; Closing orgy - The Journalist; Paige Ashley, Lexi Ward, Kai Taylor - Man Trap: Apply Within; Claire Castel group scene - Pornochic 23: Claire Castel; Melanie Memphis, Aliz, J. J., Neeo, Mr. Pete, Ian Scott, Mick Blue - A Ship E-rect; Holly D., Pascal White - Stilettos; Aliz, J. J., Leny Ewil - Swinger's Club Prive 2: Cum and Party; Franki, Danny D., George Uhl, Iain Tate - Young Harlots: Highland Fling
Best Girl-Girl Sex Scene	The Fan Awards
**Dani Daniels, Sinn Sage - Dani Daniels Dare**; Jessie Andrews, Taylor Vixen - Lush 2; Aiden Ashley, Kimberly Kane - Star Wars XXX: A Porn Parody; Lily Carter, Skin Diamond - Interracial Lesbian Romance; Jelena Jensen, Ryan Keely - Me and My Girlfriend; Remy LaCroix, Lexi Belle - Remy; Sunny Leone, Daisy Marie - Lesbian Workout; Chastity Lynn, Dana DeArmond - Belladonna: Fetish Fanatic 10; Kristina Rose, Belladonna - Kristina Rose: Unfiltered; Brett Rossi, Riley Jensen - An American Werewolf in London XXX Porn Parody; Brett Rossi, Celeste Star - Nice Shoes, Wanna Fuck?; Bobbi Starr, Lexi Belle - Vicarious; India Summer, Prinzzess - Lesbian Sex 9	Favorite Body: **Riley Steele**; Twitter Queen: **April O'Neil**; Favorite Porn Star: **Riley Steele**; Best Free Adult Website: **pornhub.com**

=== Additional Award Winners ===
These awards were not presented during the awards ceremony itself but were announced separately. In addition, the awards for Best Animated Release, Best Gonzo Series, Best Softcore Release, and Best Vignette Series were on the list of award categories, but were not presented in 2013.

**Video/DVD Categories**

- Best All-Girl Group Sex Scene: Brooklyn Lee, Ruth Medina, Samantha Bentley - Brooklyn Lee: Nymphomaniac
- Best All-Girl Release: Dani
- Best All-Girl Series: Women Seeking Women
- Best All-Sex Release: Oil Overload 7
- Best Amateur Release: Dare Dorm 9
- Best Amateur Series: College Rules
- Best Anal Release: Anal Boot Camp
- Best Anal Series: Anal Fanatic
- Best Art Direction: Star Wars XXX: A Porn Parody
- Best BDSM Release: Rubber Bordello
- Best Big Bust Release: Big Wet Tits 11
- Best Big Bust Series: Boobaholics Anonymous
- Best Big Butt Release: Big Wet Asses 21
- Best Big Butt Series: Big Wet Asses
- Best Celebrity Sex Tape: Octomom Home Alone
- Best Classic Release: Buttwoman II: Behind Bars
- Best Comedy: Nurses 2
- Best Continuing Series: Slutty and Sluttier - Manuel Ferrara/Evil Angel
- Best Director – Foreign Feature: Max Candy - Inglorious Bitches
- Best Director – Foreign Non-Feature: Ettore Buchi - Adventures on the Lust Boat 2
- Best Director – Non Feature: Jules Jordan - Alexis Ford Darkside
- Best Director – Parody: Axel Braun - Star Wars XXX: A Porn Parody
- Best Double Penetration Sex Scene: Asa Akira, Ramón Nomar, Mick Blue - Asa Akira Is Insatiable 3
- Best DVD Extras: Voracious: The First Season - John Stagliano/Evil Angel
- Best Educational Release: Belladonna's How to: “Fuck!”
- Best Ethnic Release – Asian: Asian Fuck Faces
- Best Ethnic Release – Black: Porn's Top Black Models 3
- Best Ethnic Release – Latin: Latin Mommas 2
- Best Ethnic Series: Big Wet Brazilian Asses
- Best Fem-Dom Strap-On Release: His Booty Is My Duty 2
- Best Foot/Leg Fetish Release: Asphyxia Heels the World
- Best Foreign Continuing Series: Art of Penetration
- Best Foreign Non-Feature: Brooklyn Lee: Nymphomaniac
- Best Gonzo Release: Bobbi Violates San Francisco
- Best Group Sex Scene: Asa Akira, Erik Everhard, Ramón Nomar, Mick Blue - Asa Akira Is Insatiable 3
- Best Internal Release: Big Tit Cream Pie 13
- Best Interracial Release: Mandingo Massacre 2
- Best Interracial Series: Mandingo Massacre
- Best Makeup: Chauncey Baker, Shelby Stevens - Men in Black: A Hardcore Parody
- Best Male Newcomer: Logan Pierce
- Best MILF/Cougar Release: It's a Mommy Thing! 6
- Best MILF/Cougar Series: MILFs Like It Big
- Best Music Soundtrack: Rubber Bordello
- Best New Production Company: Skow Digital
- Best New Series: Ultimate Fuck Toy
- Best Non-Sex Performance: James Bartholet, Not The Three Stooges XXX
- Best Older Woman/Younger Girl Release: Cheer Squad Sleepovers
- Best Oral Release: American Cocksucking Sluts 2
- Best Oral Series: Massive Facials
- Best Orgy/Gangbang Release: Gangbanged 4
- Best Original Song: "She-donistic Society" by Fat Mike - Rubber Bordello
- Best Overall Marketing Campaign – Company Image: Girlfriends Films
- Best Overall Marketing Campaign – Individual Project: Star Wars XXX: A Porn Parody - Axel Braun/Vivid
- Best Packaging: Birds of Prey XXX: A Sinister Comixxx Parody - Sinister Comixxx/Pure Play
- Best POV Release: Eye Fucked Them All

**Video/DVD Categories (ctd.)**

- Best POV Series: Pound the Round P.O.V.
- Best POV Sex Scene: Asa Akira, Jules Jordan, Asa Akira to the Limit
- Best Pro-Am Release: Brand New Faces 36: Natural Newbies
- Best Pro-Am Series: Brand New Faces
- Best Renting and Selling Release: - Star Wars XXX: A Porn Parody
- Best Screenplay – Parody: Axel Braun, Mark Logan - Star Wars XXX: A Porn Parody
- Best Solo Sex Scene: Joanna Angel - Joanna Angel: Filthy Whore
- Best Special Effects: Men in Black: A Hardcore Parody
- Best Specialty Release – Other Genre: Brand New Faces 35: Curvy Edition
- Best Specialty Series – Other Genre: Mother-Daughter Exchange Club
- Best Squirting Release: Seasoned Players 17: The Squirting Edition
- Best Supporting Actor: Tom Byron, Star Wars XXX: A Porn Parody
- Best Supporting Actress: Capri Anderson - Pee-Wee's XXX Adventure: A Porn Parody
- Best Tease Performance: Remy LaCroix, Lexi Belle - Remy
- Best 3D Release: Jailhouse Heat 3D
- Best Three-Way Sex Scene – Boy/Boy/Girl: Mick Blue, Ramón Nomar, Lexi Belle, Lexi
- Best Three-Way Sex Scene – Girl/Girl/Boy: Asa Akira, Brooklyn Lee, James Deen - Asa Akira Is Insatiable 3
- Best Transsexual Release: American She-Male X
- Best Transsexual Series: America's Next Top Tranny
- Best Transsexual Sex Scene: Foxxy, Christian XXX - American Tranny 2
- Best Vignette Release: Slutty and Sluttier 16
- Best Wall-to-Wall Release: Best New Starlets 2012
- Best Young Girl Release: Cuties 3
- Best Young Girl Series: The Innocence of Youth
- Clever Title of the Year: Does This Dick Make My Ass Look Big?
- Crossover Star of the Year: James Deen, Sunny Leone (tie)
- Female Foreign Performer of the Year: Aleska Diamond
- Male Foreign Performer of the Year: Rocco Siffredi
- MILF/Cougar Performer of the Year: Julia Ann
- Most Outrageous Sex Scene: Brooklyn Lee, Rocco Siffredi in “Clothespin-Head” from Voracious: The First Season
- Unsung Male Performer of the Year: Mark Ashley
- Unsung Starlet of the Year: Brandy Aniston

**Pleasure Products**

- Best Boutique: Feelmore 510 (Oakland)
- Best Enhancement Manufacturer: The Screaming O
- Best Fetish Manufacturer: Sportsheets
- Best Lingerie or Apparel Manufacturer: Baci Lingerie
- Best Lubricant Manufacturer: Pjur USA
- Best Pleasure Product Manufacturer – Small: Jimmyjane
- Best Pleasure Product Manufacturer – Medium: JOPEN
- Best Pleasure Product Manufacturer – Large: Fleshlight
- Best Product Line for Men: Ego, JOPEN
- Best Product Line for Women: Insignia, LELO

**Retail and Distribution**

- Best Adult Distributor: IVD/East Coast News
- Best Retail Chain – Small: The Pleasure Chest
- Best Retail Chain – Large: Adam & Eve

**Web and Technology Categories**

- Best Affiliate Program: PussyCash
- Best Alternative Website: Kink.com
- Best Dating Website: AdultFriendFinder.com
- Best Live Chat Website: LiveJasmin.com
- Best Membership Site: Brazzers.com
- Best Online Retail Website: AdultDVDEmpire.com
- Best Photography Website: AndrewBlake.com
- Best Porn Star Website: Joanna Angel - JoannaAngel.com
- Best Solo Girl Website: Jelena Jensen - JelenaJensen.com
- Best Studio Website: Evil Angel - EvilAngelVideo.com
- Best Web Premiere: Voracious: Episodes 1–9 - EvilAngel.com

== Honorary AVN Awards ==
=== Reuben Sturman Award ===
Lasse Braun was awarded the Reuben Sturman Award, which "recognizes industry stalwarts who've made revolutionary strides for industry rights by battling legal and free speech obstructions."

=== Visionary Award ===
Adam & Eve founder Phil Harvey was chosen to receive the second annual Visionary Award "not only for his success in taking a novelty start-up company into nearly every realm of adult commerce, but also for his sense of civic responsibility in helping to prevent the scourge of sexually transmitted diseases and unwanted pregnancies from destroying lives in Third World countries."

=== Hall of Fame ===
The AVN Awards Hall of Fame inductees, "a handful of individuals who’ve left a perennial imprint in the history pages of the adult entertainment industry," for 2013 were:

- Video Branch: Kandi Barbour, Ashley Blue, Vanessa Blue, Mary Carey, Francois Clousot, Manuel Ferrara, Jesse Jane, Rebecca Lord, Shy Love, Anna Malle, Katie Morgan, Ralph Parfait, Mike Quasar, Julie Simone, Chris Streams and Vaniity
- Internet Founders Branch: Danni Ashe, Founder of Danni's Hard Drive; Anthony J., Founder of NetVideoGirls.com; and Bill Pinyon & Steve Wojcik, Founders of Badpuppy.com
- Pleasure Product Branch: Dennis Paradise of Paradise Marketing, Mark Franks of Castle Megastore, and Teddy Rothstein, Irwin Schwartz & Elliot Schwartz of Nasstoys/Novelties by Nasswalk

== Multiple awards and nominations ==
The following releases received multiple awards:

- 6 awards: Star Wars XXX: A Porn Parody
- 3 awards: Asa Akira Is Insatiable 3, Rubber Bordello
- 2 awards: Alexis Ford Darkside, Asa Akira to the Limit, Brooklyn Lee: Nymphomaniac, Men in Black: A Hardcore Parody, Oil Overload 7, Torn, Voracious: The First Season

The following releases received the most nominations:

- 20 nominations: Star Wars XXX: A Porn Parody
- 18 nominations: Voracious: The First Season
- 14 nominations: Men in Black: A Hardcore Parody & Spartacus MMXII: The Beginning

The following individuals received multiple awards:

- 5 awards: Asa Akira
- 4 awards: Brooklyn Lee
- 3 awards: Lexi Belle, Mick Blue, Axel Braun, James Deen, Ramón Nomar, Rocco Siffredi, Graham Travis
- 2 awards: Joanna Angel, Jules Jordan, Remy LaCroix, Riley Steele

The following individuals received the most nominations:

- 17 nominations: Mick Blue & James Deen
- 14 nominations: Brooklyn Lee & Lexi Belle
- 13 nominations: Asa Akira, Lily Carter, Manuel Ferrara
- 11 nominations: Ramón Nomar
- 10 nominations: Chanel Preston & Nacho Vidal
- 9 nominations: Bobbi Starr, Joanna Angel, Erik Everhard, Mr. Pete, Lee Roy Myers
- 8 nominations: Dani Daniels & Gracie Glam
- 7 nominations: Allie Haze, Remy LaCroix, Skin Diamond, Kristina Rose, Brad Armstrong

== Presenters and performers ==
The following individuals were presenters or performers during the awards ceremony:

=== Presenters ===
Presenters (in order of appearance)

Name(s)	Role
Lea Lexis and Nick Hawk	Presenters of the Best Actor and Best Girl/Girl Sex Scene awards
Tom Byron, Phoenix Marie, Ana Foxxx	Presenters of the Best Star Showcase and Best Oral Sex Scene awards
Prinzzess Felicity Jade, Teagan Presley, Bailey Blue	Presenters of the Best Romance and Best Boy/Girl Sex Scene awards
Brooklyn Lee	Presenter of the AVN Best New Starlet Award
Joseline Hernandez, Stevie J., Ron Jeremy	Presenters of the Best Anal Sex Scene and Best Parody - Comedy awards
Steven Hirsch	Presenter of the Visionary Award
Annika Albrite, Riley Reid, Tommy Pistol	Presenters of the Best Actress and Best Parody - Drama awards
India Summer, Kimberly Kane, Dyanna Lauren	Presenters of the Transsexual Performer of the Year, Male Performer of the Year and Female Performer of the Year awards
Taylor Vixen, Brett Rossi, Emily Addison	Presenters of the Best Foreign Feature and Best Sex Scene in a Foreign Production awards
Axel Braun	Presenter of the Reuben Sturman Award
Lexi Belle, Aiden Ashley, Phil Varone	Presenters of the Best Drama and Director of the Year awards
Stormy Daniels, Jessica Drake, Kaylani Lei, Alektra Blue, Samantha Saint	Presenters of the Movie of the Year award

=== Trophy girls ===
Trophy girls
- Bonnie Rotten
- Teal Conrad
- Rikki Six

=== Performers ===
Performers

Name(s)	Role	Performed
April Macie	Host	Comedian
Tyga	Performer	Hip-hop hits "Rack City" and "Make It Nasty"
The Girls of Spearmint Rhino Las Vegas	Performer	Dance
Cirque du Soleil's Zumanity	Performers	Mix of dance, sensuality and acrobatics
Mark Stone and DJ Starlett	Performers	Original music

== Ceremony information ==
=== Changes to awards categories ===
Beginning with the 30th AVN Awards, the following changes to award categories took place:

- The AVN Award for Best Feature has been renamed Best Drama to properly complement Best Comedy.
- The AVN Award for Best All-Sex Release - Mixed Format has been renamed Best Wall-to-Wall Release for movies that mix gonzo, vignette and all-sex scene genres.
- The discontinued AVN Award previously known as Best All-Sex/Vignette Series has been reintroduced as Best Continuing Series. (Similarly, the existing Best Foreign All-Sex Series and Best Foreign All-Sex Release awards were renamed Best Foreign Continuing Series and Best Foreign Non-Feature respectively.)
- The discontinued AVN Award Best New Production Company has been reintroduced because of market expansion.
- New categories, including Best Romance Release, Best Star Showcase and Best Transsexual Sex Scene have been introduced to reflect evolving market trends.

=== Reception and review ===
Some media outlets were impressed by the show. Robin Leach of the Las Vegas Sun reported, "It was the annual sea of sexiness that couldn't take place anywhere else in the world." He also noted the large size of the crowd as did the Huffington Post, which pointed out, "Thousands of fanboys and porn stars flooded the halls" and "all the A-listers were there."

== In Memoriam ==
As the show was beginning, AVN used a video segment to pay a tribute to adult-industry personalities who had died since the 2012 awards show:

- Actress Kandi Barbour
- Actor Sledge Hammer
- Actress Hollie Stevens
- Director Kirdy Stevens (Taboo 1–5)
- Big Top Video's Sam Lessner
- Mainstream softcore director Zalman King
- First Amendment to the United States Constitution attorney Steven Swander.

Time constraints prevented the segment from being re-edited to include director Fred J. Lincoln, who had died a couple of days earlier.

== See also ==
- AVN Awards
- AVN Award for Male Performer of the Year
- AVN Female Performer of the Year Award
- AVN Award for Male Foreign Performer of the Year
- List of members of the AVN Hall of Fame

== Notes ==
^A Rather than nominees for the Movie of the Year category, voting is conducted separately just prior to the awards ceremony from among winners in "best release" categories including those listed.
