= Pornography in the United States =

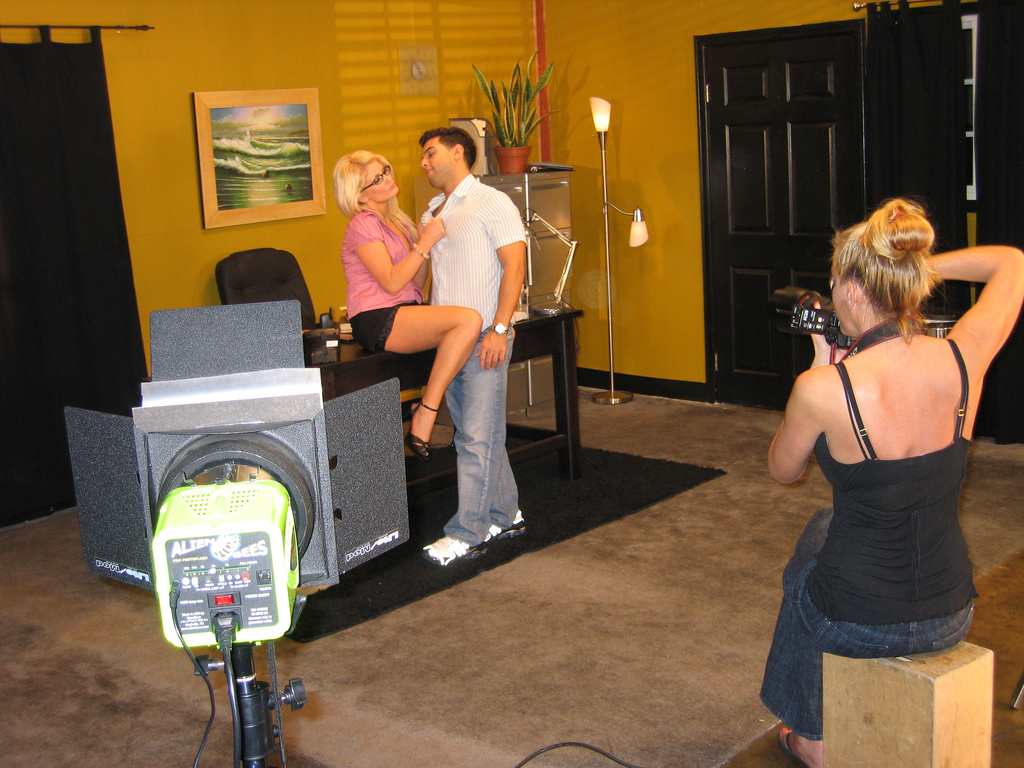
On the set of a pornographic film

Pornography has existed since the origins of the United States, and has become more readily accessible in the 21st century. Advanced by technological development, it has gone from a hard-to-find "back alley" item, beginning in 1969 with Blue Movie by Andy Warhol, the Golden Age of Porn (1969–1984) and home video, to being more available in the country and later, starting in the 1990s, readily accessible to nearly anyone with a computer or other device connected to the Internet.

Attempts made to suppress it include: outright bans, prohibitions of its sale, censorship or rating schemes that restrict audience numbers, and claims that it is prostitution and thereby subject to regulations governing prostitution. Legal decisions affecting production and consumption of pornography include those relating to its definition, its relationship with prostitution, the definition of obscenity, rulings about personal possession of pornography, and its standing in relation to freedom of expression rights.

American advocates for pornography often cite the First Amendment to the United States Constitution, which guarantees freedom of speech; however, under the Miller test established by Miller v. California, anything lacking "serious literary, artistic, political, or scientific value" is generally not protected. Several studies have found that the United States has been the largest producer of pornography.

== History ==
Although pornography dates back thousands of years, its existence in the U.S. can be traced to its 18th-century origins and the influx of foreign trade and immigrants. By the end of the 18th century, France had become the leading country regarding the spread of porn pictures. Porn had become the subject of playing-cards, posters, post cards, and cabinet cards. Prior to this, printers were previously limited to engravings, woodcuts, and line cuts for illustrations. As trade increased and more people immigrated from countries with less Puritanical and more relaxed attitudes toward human sexuality, the amount of available visual pornography increased.

In 1880, halftone printing was used to reproduce photographs inexpensively for the first time. The invention of halftone printing took pornography and erotica in new directions at the beginning of the 20th century. The new printing processes allowed photographic images to be reproduced easily in black and white.

The first porn daguerreotype appeared in 1850 and with the advent of "moving pictures" by the Lumière brothers the first porn film was made soon after the public exhibition of their creation. Pornographic film production commenced almost immediately after the invention of the motion picture in 1895. Two of the earliest pioneers were Eugène Pirou and Albert Kirchner. Kirchner directed the earliest surviving pornographic film for Pirou under the trade name "Léar". The 1896 film, Le Coucher de la Marie showed Louise Willy performing a striptease. Pirou's film inspired a genre of risqué French films showing women disrobing and other filmmakers realized profits could be made from such films. In the United States, one of Thomas Edison's first efforts using his methods and equipment for making moving pictures was of a nude woman getting up from her bath tub and running away.

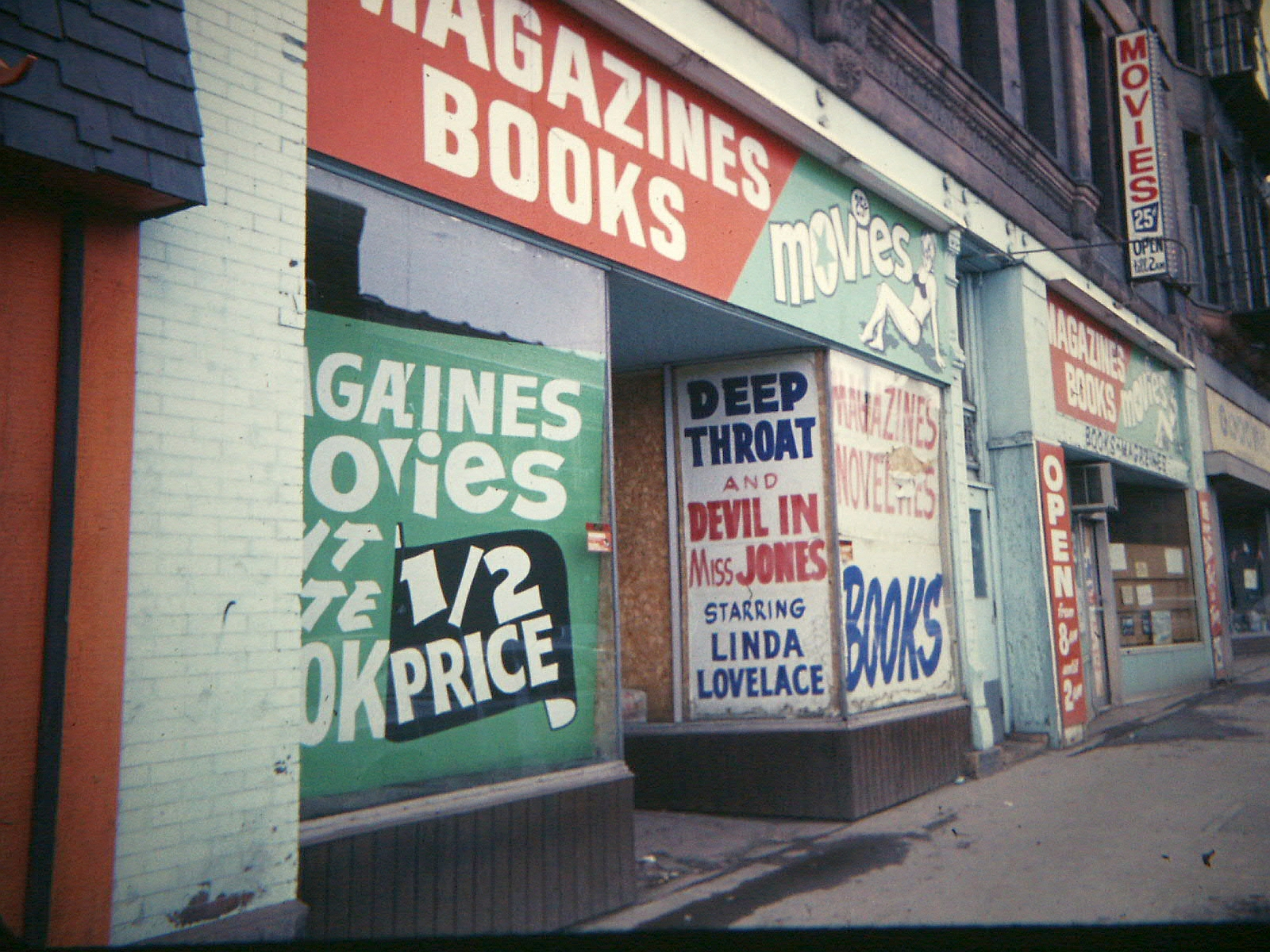
Pornographic retail in Duluth, Minnesota (1978)

In the 20th century, the era of "blue movies" began with the silent films of the 1920s and continued throughout the post-war era as film technology improved and equipment costs were reduced to a consumer-affordable level. Particularly with the introduction of the 8mm and super-8 film gauges, popular for the home movie market. Until the advent of electronic and digital video technology, the mass production of pornographic films was tied directly to the mainstream film industry. Beginning in 1969 with Blue Movie by Andy Warhol, the subsequent Golden Age of Porn and more permissive legislation, a rise of adult theaters in the United States, and many other countries, developed. There was also a proliferation of coin-operated "movie booths" in sex shops that displayed pornographic "loops" (so called because they projected a movie from film arranged in a continuous loop).

By 1982, pornographic film production had switched to the cheaper and more convenient medium of video tape. Many film directors were hesitant to switch because of the different image quality that video tape produced. Those who did make the change benefited from greater profits since consumers preferred the new format. This change moved the films out of the theaters and into people's private homes. This was the end of the age of big budget productions and the beginning of the mainstreaming of pornography. It soon went back to its earthy roots and expanded to cover every fetish possible since video production was inexpensive. Instead of hundreds of pornographic films being made each year, thousands of videos were including compilations of just the sex scenes from various titles.

In the late 1990s, pornographic films were distributed on DVD. These offered better quality picture and sound than the previous video format and allowed innovations such as "interactive" videos that let users choose such variables as multiple camera angles, multiple endings and computer-only DVD content.

The introduction and widespread availability of the Internet further changed the way pornography was distributed. Previously videos would be rented or purchased through mail-order, but with the Internet people could watch pornographic movies on their computers, and instead of waiting weeks for an order to arrive, a movie could be downloaded within minutes (or, later, within a few seconds).

As of the 2000s, there were hundreds of adult film companies, releasing tens of thousands of productions, recorded directly on video, with minimal sets. Of late, web-cams and webcams recordings are again expanding the market. Thousands of pornographic actors work in front of the camera to satisfy pornography consumers' demand while often making money per view.

By the 2010s, the fortunes of the pornography industry had changed. With reliably profitable DVD sales being largely supplanted by streaming media delivery over the Internet, competition from pirate, amateur, and low-cost professional content on the Internet had made the industry substantially less profitable, leading to it shrinking in size.

In 2025, Michigan's proposal named Anti-Corruption of Public Morals Act was introduced to criminalize pornography content online, along with transgender and VPNs in Michigan, with up to 20 years in prison and a fine of $100,000 or both and 25 years in prison and a fine of $125,000 or both if individual has more than 100 pieces.

== Publication ==
=== Print ===
American adult magazines which have the widest distribution do not violate the Miller test and can be legally distributed. Adult magazines have been largely put into mainstream by the pioneer Playboy. However, during the so-called Pubic Wars in the 1960s and 1970s Penthouse established itself as a more explicit magazine. Screw moved the bar toward hardcore when it first came out in 1968 and with Hustler appearing in 1974 the move to hardcore was complete. By the mid-1990s magazines like Playboy had become noncompetitive and even hardcore publications like Penthouse and Hustler struggled. According to Laura Kipnis, a cultural theorist and critic, "the Hustler body is an unromanticized body—no vaselined lens or soft focus: this is neither the airbrushed top-heavy fantasy body of Playboy, nor the ersatz opulence, the lingeried and sensitive crotch shots of Penthouse, transforming female genitals into objets d'art. It's a body, not a surface or a suntan: insistently material, defiantly vulgar, corporeal".

Many adult magazines in the United States are usually sold wrapped to avoid incidental viewing by minors and are now highlighted by special features or themes. For instance, a primarily softcore magazine, Barely Legal, focuses on models between 18 and 23 years of age. Hustler's Leg World is focused on the female legs and feet. Perfect 10 publishes images of women untouched by plastic surgery or airbrushing.

Pornographic bookstores have been subject to U.S. zoning laws.

=== Movies and pay-per-view ===
Majority of the pornography produced in the United States is in the form of movies and alternatively posted to the Internet. There is a variety of genres including common heterosexual content, and further genres specify to S/M, BDSM, interracial sex, ethnic, etc.

Early American stag films included Wonders of the Unseen World (1927), An Author's True Story (1933), Goodyear (1950s), Smart Alec (1951), and Playmates (1956–58). Breakthrough films, such as 1969's Blue Movie by Andy Warhol, 1972's Deep Throat, 1973's The Devil in Miss Jones and 1976's The Opening of Misty Beethoven by Radley Metzger, launched the so-called "porno chic" phenomenon in the United States and enabled the commercialization of the adult film industry. In this period America's most notorious pornographer was Reuben Sturman. According to the U.S. Department of Justice, throughout the 1970s, Sturman controlled most of the pornography circulating in the country.

The country now houses over 40 adult movie studios featuring heterosexual scenes, more than any other country. The branch, according to founder and president of Adult Video News Paul Fishbein, involves the manufacturers of adult products, distributors, suppliers, retail store owners, wholesalers, distributors, cable TV buyers, and foreign buyers. The production is concentrated in San Fernando Valley (mainly in Chatsworth, Reseda and Van Nuys) and Las Vegas, where more than 200 adult entertainment companies gather to network and show off their latest wares. The world's largest adult movies studio, Vivid Entertainment, generates an estimated $100 million a year in revenue, distributing 60 films annually and selling them in video stores, hotel rooms, on cable systems, and on the Internet. Vivid's two largest regional competitors are Wicked Pictures and Digital Playground. Boulder Colorado-based New Frontier Media, a leading distributor of adult movies (at NASDAQ since November 2000), is one of the two adult video companies traded publicly, the other one being Spanish Private Media Group.

The industry's decision to embrace VHS in the early 1980s, for example, helped to do away with Sony Betamax, despite the latter format's superior quality. Video rentals soared from just under 80 million in 1985 to half-billion by 1993. Suffering at the hands of video warez tended not to be publicly stressed by country's film industry. In 1999 there were 711 million rentals of hardcore films. 11,300 hardcore films were released in 2002.

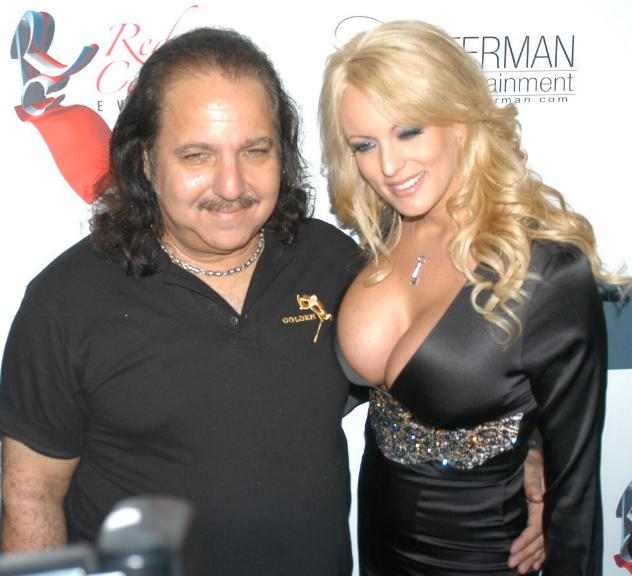
Ron Jeremy and Stormy Daniels in March 2007

In the recent years, according to Fishbein, there are well over 800 million rentals of adult videotapes and DVDs in video stores across the country. Digital Playground said it is choosing the Blu-ray Disc for all of its "interactive" films because of its greater capacity.

The female demographic is considered to be the biggest catalyst for pornographic cultural crossover. According to Adella O'Neal, a Digital Playground publicist, in 2000 roughly 9% of the company's consumers were women while four years later that figure has bloomed to 53%.

American adult pay-per-view television is presently unregulated since it is not technically "broadcasting" as defined in the Federal Communications Act. Cable and satellite television networks host about six main adult-related channels. Most of them (particularly Playboy TV, Penthouse TV, and Hustler TV (there is also a "Hustler Video", a line of raunchy films created by Larry Flynt)) are maintained by three mainstream porn magazines. In 1999 Playboy Enterprises sold to Vivid Entertainment a small channel which was renamed to Hot Network. Since that Vivid launched two more channels—the Hot Zone and Vivid TV. The viewers paid close to $400 million a year to tune into Vivid's hardcore content and the company soon overtook Playboy as operator of the world's largest adult-TV network. However, after passing the 2000 United States v. Playboy Entertainment Group case Playboy bought all three networks from Vivid in 2001 and folded them into "Playboy's Spice" brand. Operators then shunned "Playboy's Spice Platinum", a new group of channels with graphic hardcore fare.

Some subsidiaries of major corporations are the largest pornography sellers, like News Corporation's DirecTV. Comcast, the nation's largest cable company, once pulled in $50 million from adult programming. Revenues of companies such as Playboy and Hustler were small by comparison.

=== Video games and comics ===
Microsoft has long declined to license development software to game makers whose titles include sexual content. Wal-Mart, America's largest distributor of video games, maintains the policy of selling no games with an AO rating. However, in recent years the pornographic content in video games has been promoted particularly by Playboy. Playboy: The Mansion became the first game built around the "Playboy" license.

A downloadable mod—"Hot Coffee" for the game Grand Theft Auto: San Andreas brought attention to the need to discuss the challenges faced in creating games with pornographic content. Meanwhile, Grand Theft Auto: San Andreas was pulled from shelves by Rockstar Games after it became public knowledge that, with the use of a Gameshark cheating device, the scene could be unlocked portraying the protagonist having sex with another character, although in the scene both characters have their clothes on. The game was later sold without the unlockable scene.

PlayStation 2 video game God of War (2005), based on Greek mythology, features an event in the first part of the game where protagonist Kratos can have sex with two topless prostitutes, who reside in a bedroom on his boat. Although no sexual acts are depicted (they occur off-screen and are indicated by sound effects), the women are shown topless. The player interacts by performing button and joystick commands that appear on screen which results in an experience reward for the player. This type of sex mini-game became a prominent feature for the God of War series, being included in its sequels God of War II (2007), God of War: Chains of Olympus (2008), God of War III (2010), and God of War: Ghost of Sparta (2010), with the latter being the final game to feature it.

The adult sections of American comic book stores frequently carry a large number of translations of Japanese hardcore comics, as well as an increasing number of home imitations.

One of the Japanese animation porn movies, which started the American adult video market, was Urotsukidoji. The adult animation market exists primarily through direct sales: mail-order to customers, and wholesale to specialty shops which cater to animation and to comic-book fans. The legal framework in both countries regarding the regulation of obscene and pornographic material is overall rather similar.

=== Internet ===
The Internet maintains a significant part of American adult entertainment, also because the 1997 Reno v. American Civil Liberties Union case specified that the term "indecent" has no specific legal meaning in the context of the Internet. More recent federal efforts, such as the CAN-SPAM Act of 2003 expressly addressed the Internet. On May 1, 2000, American Express announced it would no longer cover transactions from adult sites. According to the committee to Study Tools and Strategies for Protecting Kids from Pornography and Their Applicability to Other Inappropriate Internet Content, there are over 100,000 subscription sites with adult content in the United States, with each site having multiple web pages. On average, a paid subscription generates $20 to $40 per month in revenue, however, an in-depth analysis is complicated. If a visitor site connects to a pay site and signs up for content, it receives a conversion fee from the larger site. A successful large operation is often an umbrella company serving many markets with pay sites. Around this core and its affiliates is a system of ad-supported service sites. The so-called portable porn market is in its initial stage in the U.S.

In 2000 the owners and operators of Playgirl.com and scores of other adult sites were charged by the U.S. Federal Trade Commission with illegally billing thousands of consumers for services that were advertised as free, and for billing other consumers who never visited the web sites at all. Nevadan Voice Media Incorporated, which ran several adult sites, was also charged by the commission. Sites often suffer from unauthorized, non-paying surfers who use stolen passwords, which can use months' worth of bandwidth in a day, costing the site operator hundreds or thousands of dollars' worth of additional bandwidth fees, all for traffic that returns no money at all. The 2002 Paragon Electric Co., Inc. v. Buy This Domain case ruled that linking domain names to pornographic sites is not per se conclusive of bad-faith registration and use, although it does raise that presumption.

A common occurrence was the use of domain names similar to known ones, such as whitehouse.com (unrelated to whitehouse.gov), which for some period featured explicit content. The use of expired domains is also common, along with typosquatting, which relies on mistakes such as typos made by Internet users when inputting a website address into a web browser.

In 2025, Michigan's the proposal named Anti-Corruption of Public Morals Act was introduced to criminalise pornography content online, along with transgender and VPNs in Michigan, with up to 20 years in prison and a fine of $100,000 or both and 25 years in prison and a fine of $125,000 or both if individual has more than 100 pieces.

Also in 2025, the Supreme Court upheld a Texas law that required sexually explicit websites to verify the age of their users. The ruling was seen as a significant shift away from the laissez faire of the early Internet period.

== Economics ==
In 1975, the total retail value of all the hardcore pornography in the U.S. was estimated at $5–10 million. The 1979 Revision of the Federal Criminal Code stated that "in Los Angeles alone, the pornography business does $100 million a year in gross retail volume" while "the average pornography magazine sells for between $6 and $10 each". According to the 1986 Attorney General's Commission on Pornography, American adult entertainment industry has grown considerably over the past thirty years by continually changing and expanding to appeal to new markets, though the production is considered to be low-profile and clandestine. The total income of modern country's adult entertainment is often rated at $10–13 billion, of which $4–6 billion are legal. The figure is often credited to a study by Forrester Research and was lowered in 1998. In 2007 The Observer newspaper also gave a figure of $13 billion. Other sources, quoted by Forbes (Adams Media Research, Veronis Suhler Communications Industry Report, and IVD), even taking into consideration all possible means (video networks and pay-per-view movies on cable and satellite, web sites, in-room hotel movies, phone sex, sex toys, and magazines) mention the $2.6–3.9 billion figure (without the cellphone component). USA Today claimed in 2003 that websites such as Danni's Hard Drive and Cybererotica.com generated $2 billion in revenue in that year, which was allegedly about 10% of the overall domestic porn market at the time. The adult movies income (from sale and rent) was once estimated by AVN Publications at $4.3 billion but how this figure was determined is unclear. According to the 2001 Forbes data the annual income distribution is like this:

| Adult video | $500 million to $1.8 billion |
| Internet | $1 billion |
| Magazines | $1 billion |
| Pay-per-view | $128 million |
| Cellphones | $30 million |

The Online Journalism Review, published by the Annenberg School of Communication at the University of Southern California, weighed in with an analysis that favored Forbes' number. The financial extent of adult films, distributed in hotels, is hard to estimate—hotels keep statistics to themselves or do not keep them at all. A CBS News investigation in November 2003 claimed that 50% of guests at the Hilton, Marriott, Hyatt, Sheraton, and Holiday Inn hotel chains purchased adult movies, contributing to 70% of in-room profits. The income of cellphone porn is low, when compared with other countries. The absence of V-chip-style parental controls on other equipment has obviated the need for American consumers to use cellphones to access explicit content.

== Legality ==
The definition of pornography in the U.S. evolved through decades, from the 1960s. In this period, recognizing ambiguities, the term "sexually explicit content" gained use as one of the pornography's euphemisms, but later it was determined that a distinction between pornographic and sexually explicit content is completely artificial.^{[e]} In Miller v. California the Supreme Court used the definition of pornography made by Webster's Third New International Dictionary of 1969 ("a depiction (as in a writing or painting) of licentiousness or lewdness: a portrayal of erotic behavior designed to cause sexual excitement"). Black's Law Dictionary followed the Miller test and defined pornography as material that taken as a whole the average person, applying contemporary community standards, would find appealing to the prurient interest. Heinle's Newbury House Dictionary of American English (2003) defined pornography as "obscene writings, pictures, or films intended to arouse sexual desire".

The Antipornography Civil Rights Ordinance defined pornography as the "graphic sexually explicit subordination of women, whether in pictures or in words". The ordinance was ruled unconstitutional by the Federal Appeals Court in American Booksellers v. Hudnut in Indianapolis (1985). Courts in California and New York have clearly rejected the argument that the making of pornography is prostitution. (See California v. Freeman (1988) and People v. Paulino (2005).) The Oregon Supreme Court went even further in State v. Henry (1987) by abolishing the legal definition of obscenity in that state, ruling it violated freedom of speech as defined in the state constitution.

Pornography as a legal term at the federal level, except the generic terms "hardcore pornography"^{[a]} and "child pornography",^{[b]} has not existed since the 1973 Miller v. California case.^{[c]} The United States Supreme Court in Miller v. California held that one type of pornography, namely obscenity, does not enjoy First Amendment protection, but recognized that individual communities had different values and opinions on obscenity. The Court defines obscenity in accordance with the Miller test. Since then several states have enacted laws that apply that test.^{[d]} Relying on the 1930 Smoot–Hawley Tariff Act and under the terms "obscene" and "immoral", the U.S. Customs and Border Protection prohibits the importation of any pornographic material (19 U.S.C. § 1305a "Immoral articles; importation prohibited").

=== Pornography as prostitution ===
Attempts were made in the United States in the 1970s to close down the pornography industry by prosecuting those in the industry on prostitution charges. The prosecution started in the courts in California in the case of People v. Freeman. The California Supreme Court acquitted Freeman and distinguished between someone who takes part in a sexual relationship for money (prostitution) versus someone whose role is merely portraying a sexual relationship on-screen as part of their acting performance. The State did not appeal to the United States Supreme Court making the decision binding in California, where most pornographic films are made today.

=== Origin of term ===
The term "pornography" first appeared in an 1857 British medical dictionary, which defined it as "a description of prostitutes or of prostitution, as a matter of public hygiene", therefore pornography by itself was not a widely used term in nineteenth-century America and the term did not appear in any version of American Dictionary of the English Language in its early editions. The dictionary introduced the entry in 1864, defining it primarily as a "treatment of, or a treatise on, the subject of prostitutes or prostitution". Early charges used the term "obscenity" as well as after Miller v. California, though the term "pornography" remained as a reference entry:

| Source | Definition |
|---|---|
| Merriam-Webster's Dictionary of Law | "Material that depicts erotic behavior and is intended to cause sexual excitement" |
| West's Encyclopedia of American Law | "The representation in books, magazines, photographs, films, and other media of scenes of sexual behavior that are erotic or lewd and are designed to arouse sexual interest"; "the depiction of sexual behavior that is intended to arouse sexual excitement in its audience" |

The censorship of pornographic materials in the United States was enabled by the way courts interpreted the First, and partially Ninth and Fourteenth amendments to the U.S. Constitution. The legal justification also includes the so-called harm principle, as in Canada and the United Kingdom. The absolutist interpretation of the First Amendment as applied to pornography has never been sustained by the Supreme Court. In the Investigation of Literature Allegedly Containing Objectionable Material, issued by the U.S. Congress Select Committee on Current Pornographic Materials in 1953, it was noted that "perhaps the greatest impediments to the prompt and effective enforcement of existing laws intended to control pornographic materials are the difficulties of establishing a precise interpretation of the word". During the Warren Court (1953–1969), the first notable court to face the cases of such kind, justices Potter Stewart, Byron White, and Arthur Goldberg shared the opinion that only hardcore pornography was not protected by the First and Fourteenth Amendments. This position was contested notably by U.S. Solicitor General James Lee Rankin (in office 1956–1961), but in Jacobellis v. Ohio Stewart concluded that criminal obscenity laws are constitutionally limited under the First and Fourteenth Amendments to hardcore pornography. Concurring in the 1957 Roth v. United States Justice John Marshall Harlan II wrote that "even assuming that pornography cannot be deemed ever to cause, in an immediate sense, criminal sexual conduct, other interests within the proper cognizance of the States may be protected by the prohibition placed on such materials."

The 1967 Public Law 90-100 found the traffic in pornography to be "a matter of national concern", as well as in obscenity. In this period the Court considered pornography to have two major dimensions. The first can be defined as dealing with sexual representations that are offensive to public morality or taste, which concerned the Court notably in the 1966 Ginzburg v. United States case. The second centers on the effect of pornography on specific individuals or classes, which is the focus of most public discussions and prior Court pornography decisions. This dimension was mentioned only twice in the array of decisions made in 1966. A frustration was expressed notably by Justice Hugo Black in the 1966 Mishkin v. New York: "I wish once more to express my objections to saddling this Court with the irksome and inevitably unpopular and unwholesome task of finally deciding by a case-by-case, sight-by-sight personal judgment of the members of this Court what pornography (whatever that means) is too hard core for people to see or read." In the 1974 Hamling v. United States decision the Supreme Court said that just because pornographic materials are for sale and purchased around the country, "Mere availability of similar materials by itself means nothing more than that other persons are engaged in similar activities." The 1976 American Heritage Dictionary of the English Language defined that pornography consists of "written, graphic, or other forms of communication intended to excite lascivious feelings". Since determining what is pornography and what is "soft core" and "hard core" are subjective questions to judges, juries, and law enforcement officials, it is difficult to define, since the law cases cannot print examples for the courts to follow. The Rehnquist Court further enhanced the power of community controls on pornography. Current Chief Justice John Roberts told at the confirmation hearing on his nomination: "Well, Senator, it's my understanding under the Supreme Court's doctrine that pornographic expression is not protected to the same extent at least as political and core speech, and the difficulty that the Court has addressed in these different areas of course is always defining what is or is not pornography and what is entitled to protection under the First Amendment and what is not".

The famous Indianapolis definition of pornography by Dworkin and MacKinnon paralleled their Minneapolis ordinance. The first was rejected by the United States Court of Appeals for the Seventh Circuit for several reasons. The ordinance did not use any of the accepted terms that the Supreme Court had developed over time for determining when material is obscene, including "prurient interest", "offensiveness", or "local community standards". Another concern was the way the women were depicted in the work. If women were referred to in the approved fashion stressing equality, the activity involved would be regardless of how sexually explicit it was. The Court also indicated that if women were referred to in a disapproving way depicting them as subversive or as enjoying humiliation, the activity would be unlawful regardless of the "literary, artistic or political qualities of the work taken as a whole". Judge Frank Easterbrook said: "We accept the premises of this legislation. Depictions of subordination tend to perpetuate subordination. The subordinate status of women in turn leads to affront and lower pay at work, insult and injury at home, battery and rape on the streets.... Yet this simply demonstrates the power of pornography as speech." Conceptions of Democracy in American Constitutional Argument: The Case of Pornography Regulation by Frank Michelman, issued by Tennessee Law Review (vol. 56, no. 291, 1989) partially consented that "pornography is political expression in that it promulgates a certain view of women's natures and thus of women's appropriate relations and treatment in society", but also concluded that the Indianapolis ordinance was precisely designed to suppress that particular view by censoring pornography. Minneapolis ordinance was struck down on the grounds that it was ambiguous and vague, however, despite its failure the proposal influenced other communities across the United States.

In May 2005 U.S. Attorney General Alberto Gonzales established an Obscenity Prosecution Task Force. The task force, according to a Department of Justice news release on May 5, was "dedicated to the investigation and prosecution of the distributors of hard-core pornography that meets the test for obscenity, as defined by the United States Supreme Court." Under President Bush's and Gonzales' rationales the FBI Adult Obscenity Squad was recruited in August 2005 to gather evidence against "manufacturers and purveyors" of pornography.

=== Child pornography ===
The 1970 Lockhart Commission recommended eliminating all criminal penalties for pornography except for pornographic depictions of minors, or sale of pornography to minors. However, prior to 1977, only two states had laws which prohibited the use of children in the production or distribution of pornographic materials or performances. In 1977, the Department of Justice strongly endorsed legislation which banned the production and dissemination of child pornography. These efforts have been unsuccessfully challenged in the 1982 New York v. Ferber case ("The States are entitled to greater leeway in the regulation of pornographic depictions of children..."). Although the states have a different age of consent, in accordance with the Child Protection and Obscenity Enforcement Act of 1988 all models featured in pornographic content should be at least 18 years of age. This kind of material is often labeled as "adult" and the appropriate disclaimers are common. They are based on what "depicts or describes, in terms patently offensive as measured by contemporary community standards, sexual or excretory activities or organs".

Acts and attempted acts pertaining to child pornography became generally unlawful at the federal level in 1984, with the passage of the Child Protection Act, and have largely remained such ever since. It is a federal crime to possess, distribute, or produce non-fictional child pornography and carries large fines and prison sentences of up to 30 years upon conviction and requirement to register as a sex offender. Digitally produced child pornography is also unlawful, provided that the material is practically indistinguishable from child pornography.

President Reagan's Remarks at the Signing Ceremony of the Child Protection Act on May 21, 1984

=== Animal crush fetish pornography ===
Animal crush pornography was the second form of pornography, other than child pornography, to become unlawful at federal level. This prohibition was first enacted into law on December 3, 1999. However, over ten years later, that initial law was found unconstitutional in United States v. Stevens (2010). In response, Congress passed the Animal Crush Video Prohibition Act of 2010. The Animal Crush Video Prohibition Act of 2010 merely made the distribution of animal crush fetish pornography illegal, but not the underlying acts of animal cruelty depicted. In 2019, the PACT Act amended the existing statute and made the underlying acts unlawful.

=== Video voyeurism pornography ===
Video voyeurism was the third form of pornography, other than child pornography and animal crush fetish pornography, to become categorically unlawful at the federal level. It became federally illegal in the United States with the passage of the Video Voyeurism Prevention Act of 2004.

=== Revenge pornography ===
Revenge porn; that is, pornography distributed for purposes of retaliation, has long been an issue in the United States. While not criminally unlawful at the federal level, in 2022, as part of the Consolidated Appropriations Act, 2022, a private right of action was established to enable the victims of revenge pornography to seek redress for the damage sustained as a result.

== Anti-pornography movement ==
An anti-pornography movement has existed in the United States since before the 1969 Supreme Court decision of Stanley v. Georgia, which held that people could view whatever they wished in the privacy of their own homes, by establishing an implied "right to privacy" in U.S. law. This led President Lyndon B. Johnson, with the backing of Congress, to appoint a commission to study pornography. The anti-pornography movement seeks to maintain or restore restrictions and to increase or create restrictions on the production, sale or dissemination of pornography.

Jesuit priest Father Morton A. Hill (1917–1985) was a leader of the campaign against pornography in the United States in the 1960s, 1970s and 1980s. He was one of the founders of Morality in Media, which was created in 1962 to fight pornography. Morality in Media was launched by an interfaith group of clergy and Hill was president until his death in 1985. Morality in Media continues with Patrick A. Trueman, a registered federal lobbyist, as president.

So prominent was Hill on the issue, that in 1969 President Lyndon B. Johnson appointed him to the President's Commission on Obscenity and Pornography. Father Hill and another clergyman on the commission, Dr. Winfrey C. Link, believed that the commission was stacked with supporters of loosening laws on pornography, and issued the Hill-Link Minority Report rebutting the conclusions of the majority report, which held that pornography should be decriminalized as there were no links between it and criminal behavior. The majority report was widely criticized and rejected by Congress. The Senate rejected the commission's findings and recommendations by a 60–5 vote, with 34 abstentions. President Nixon, who had succeeded Johnson in 1969, also emphatically rejected the majority report. The Hill-Link Minority Report, on the other hand, which recommended maintaining anti-obscenity statutes, was read into the record of both the United States Senate and the United States House of Representatives. It was cited by the Burger Court in its 1973 obscenity decisions, including Miller v. California.

== See also ==
- Pornography in Germany
- Pornography in Australia
- Pornography in Brazil
- Pornography in France
- Pornography in the United Kingdom
- Pornography in India
- Sexuality in India

== Notes ==
a In the 1969 Stanley v. Georgia case (later followed by the 1971 United States v. Reidel), the Supreme Court ruled that private possession of pornography (except child pornography as determined in 1990 by a 6 to 3 decision) in the home was not a crime, nor was it subject to government regulation. Technically why people have a constitutional right to watch hardcore pornography privately has never been explained, but in the 1973 Paris Adult Theatre I v. Slaton Chief Justice Burger wrote: "We categorically disapprove the theory, apparently adopted by the trial judge, that obscene, pornographic films acquire constitutional immunity from state regulation simply because they are exhibited for consenting adults only. This holding was properly rejected by the Georgia Supreme Court." Miller v. California held 5–4 that the state may outlaw the showing of hardcore pornographic films, even if the "adult theatre" is clearly labeled and warns.

b. Sex tourism involving persons under 18 outside the U.S. is also illegal.

c. The term "dial-a-porn" was used at the federal level e.g. by the Telecommunications Act of 1996, but it was partially voided by federal courts over subsequent years. Another term usage includes the 1996 Denver Area Educational Telecommunications Consortium v. Federal Communications Commission certiorari to the Court of Appeals for the District of Columbia Circuit.

d The transportation of pornography in interstate commerce was banned in the 1973 case of United States v. Orito. The Supreme Court upheld zoning restrictions that either quarantine or disperse pornography merchants, leaving it to local officials to determine whether local interests are best served by restricting all porn merchants to a single district. Though the Court has also upheld zoning that prohibits pornographic entertainment within a certain distance of a school, the legitimate primary purpose excludes the preventing of access by minors which can be achieved much more directly by simple restrictions. On May 13, 2002, writing for the majority in Ashcroft v. American Civil Liberties Union, Justice Clarence Thomas stated that using community standards to identify material that could be harmful to minors does not make the law overly broad and therefore unconstitutional under the First Amendment.

e Utah uses the legal term "pornography" for the same illegal sexually explicit material.

f See also the 1977 Splawn v. California and 1978 Pinkus v. United States.
