= Pornography in Slovakia =

Pornography is legal in Slovakia since its independence. Slovakia maintains a small pornography industry relative to neighbouring countries such as the Czechia and Hungary, largely attributed to more conservative societal attitudes.

== History ==
There are few preserved information about the history of pornography prior to mid 20th century. A notable exception is the secret publishing house Hartleb that operated in Bratislava from approximately 1905 to 1910, when it was suppressed by the authorities. It produced around 30 erotic-pornographic bibliophile editions, almost exclusively focused on sadomasochistic content. The firm was run by Hermann Hartleb, a former major in the Dutch colonial army. Books were published in German (the dominant language in the city at the time) and featured illustrations of ladies punishing gentlemen with whips, whimsical adventures in sadomasochistic boarding houses, works by or inspired by the Marquis de Sade, and editions linked to Leopold von Sacher-Masoch.

During the Communist era, pornography production and distribution was illegal in Czechoslovakia. After the country's trasition to democracy, pornographic content became both legal and widely available. The first sex shop in Slovakia was opened in 1991 by the Raffay family.

In the mid-1990s, several well-known Slovak and Czech actors participated in the two-part erotic anthology film Vášnivé známosti (Lusty Liaisons). Marketed as an adaptation of erotic stories and fables by classic authors including Boccaccio and La Fontaine, the film featured Katarína Brychtová, Miro Noga, Zuzana Fialová, Michal Gučík and others. Cast members later stated that they had believed they were filming a tasteful literary erotic production intended solely for foreign distribution and that they only later discovered its marketing as an “erotic night title”. In the pre-internet era, verifying the producers’ background was difficult, and the project offered above-average compensation.

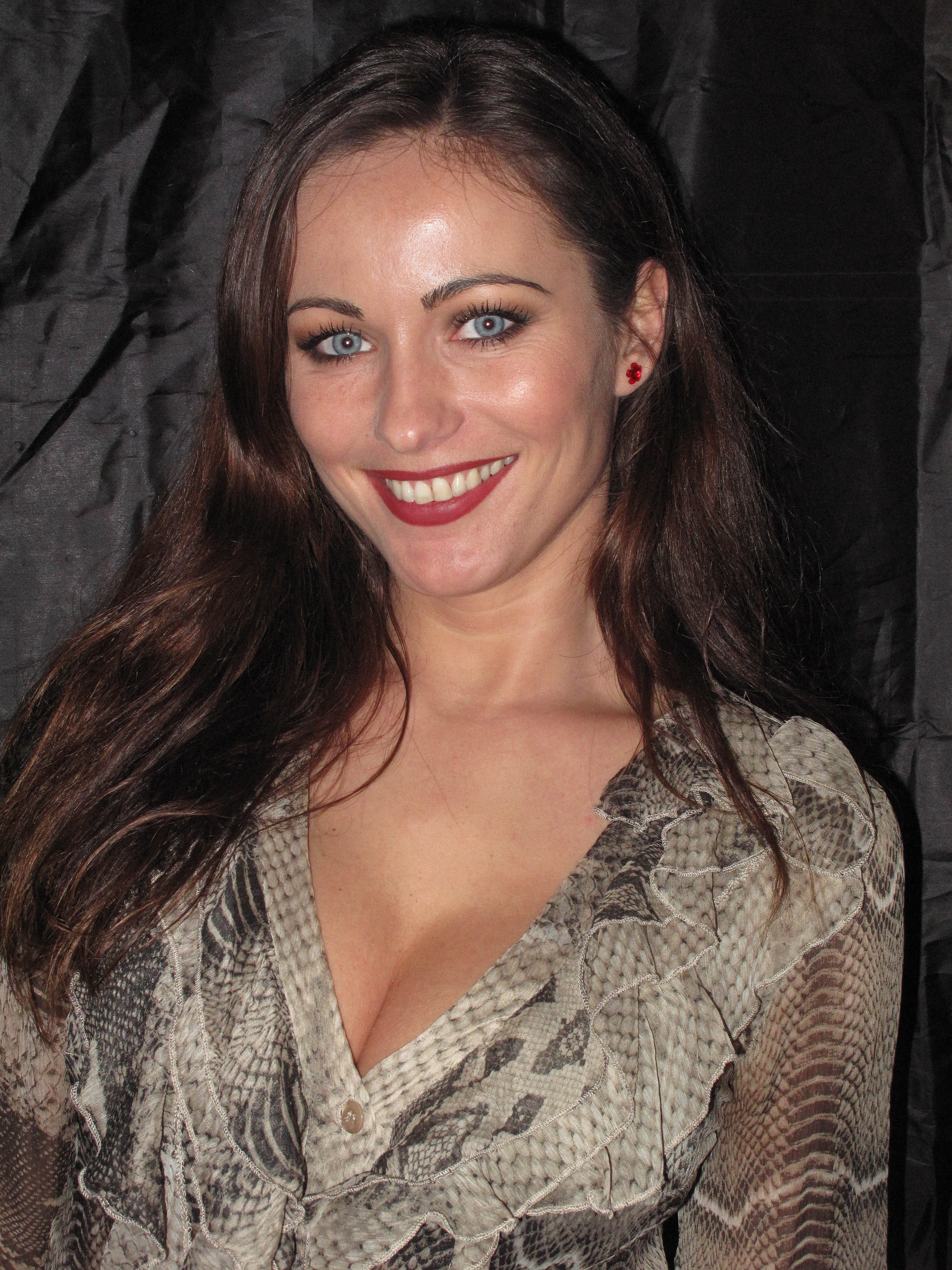
Kyla Cole

In 1997, the newly launched private TV channel Markíza featured an erotic talk show Erotic Salon GLP, hosted by the actor Ľubomír Gregor along with Dagmar Lakčevič and Dag Palovič. In 1998, it was replaced by Sexeso, which consisted of erotic games and discussion of various aspects of sexuality. The most successful show was Láskanie, which was aired until 2007, which was at various times hosted by the actress Silvia Petöová, softcore model Kyla Cole, Andrea Ušiaková and Zuzana Belohorcová. Markíza's rival TV JOJ briefly aired its own erotic show Črepiny s hviezdičkou.

In contrast to the neighboring Czechia or Hungary, pornography production in Slovakia is minimal, likely due to more conservative societal values.

=== Notable personalities ===
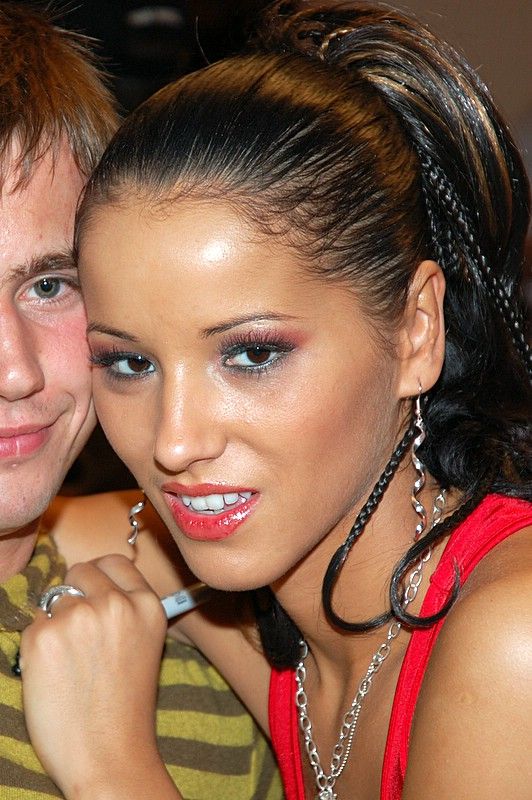
Angel Dark

Slovak pornstar Angel Dark was awarded the AVN Award for Female Foreign Performer of the Year in 2011 and inducted in to the AVN Hall of Fame in 2020. Other notable pornstars include Diana Doll, Claudia Rossi, Karma Rosenberg, Mili Jay and Suzie Diamond as well as gay male performers Lukas Ridgeston and Johan Paulik.

The only major studio with office in Bratislava is BelAmi, a gay production established in 1993 by filmmaker George Duroy, a Slovak native who took his pseudonym from the protagonist Georges Duroy in Guy de Maupassant's novel Bel-Ami.

The most prominent softcore model from Slovakia is the Penthouse Pet Kyla Cole.

== Legality ==
Pornography depicting consenting adults is fully legal in Slovakia. The only exception is that inmates are barred from possessing pornographic materials. This ban was challenged but upheld both by the Constitutional Court of Slovakia in 2017 and subsequently the European Court of Human Rights in 2022.

Child pornography (defined in the Criminal Code § 132(4) as depictions of real or pretended sexual acts, contact, or exposed body parts involving a child under 18 or a person appearing as such, for sexual purposes, including performances) is strictly prohibited, with penalties ranging from 2 years for possession or electronic access (§ 370) to 5 years for distribution (§ 369) and up to 10 (12 if aggravated) years for production (§ 368). Despite strict lagal framework, the practical enforcement is sometimes inperfect. In 2019 for example, it was reported that one of the major global child porn hosting hubs was located in Slovakia.

In 2023, the MP Martin Čepček proposed limiting access to pornography to persons over the age of 18 "with authorisation by the authorities". Nonetheless, he did not elaborate which institution should authorise people interestested in watching pornography to do so and the proposal failed to win wider support.
