= Anna Polina =

Russian/French pornographic actress (born 1989)

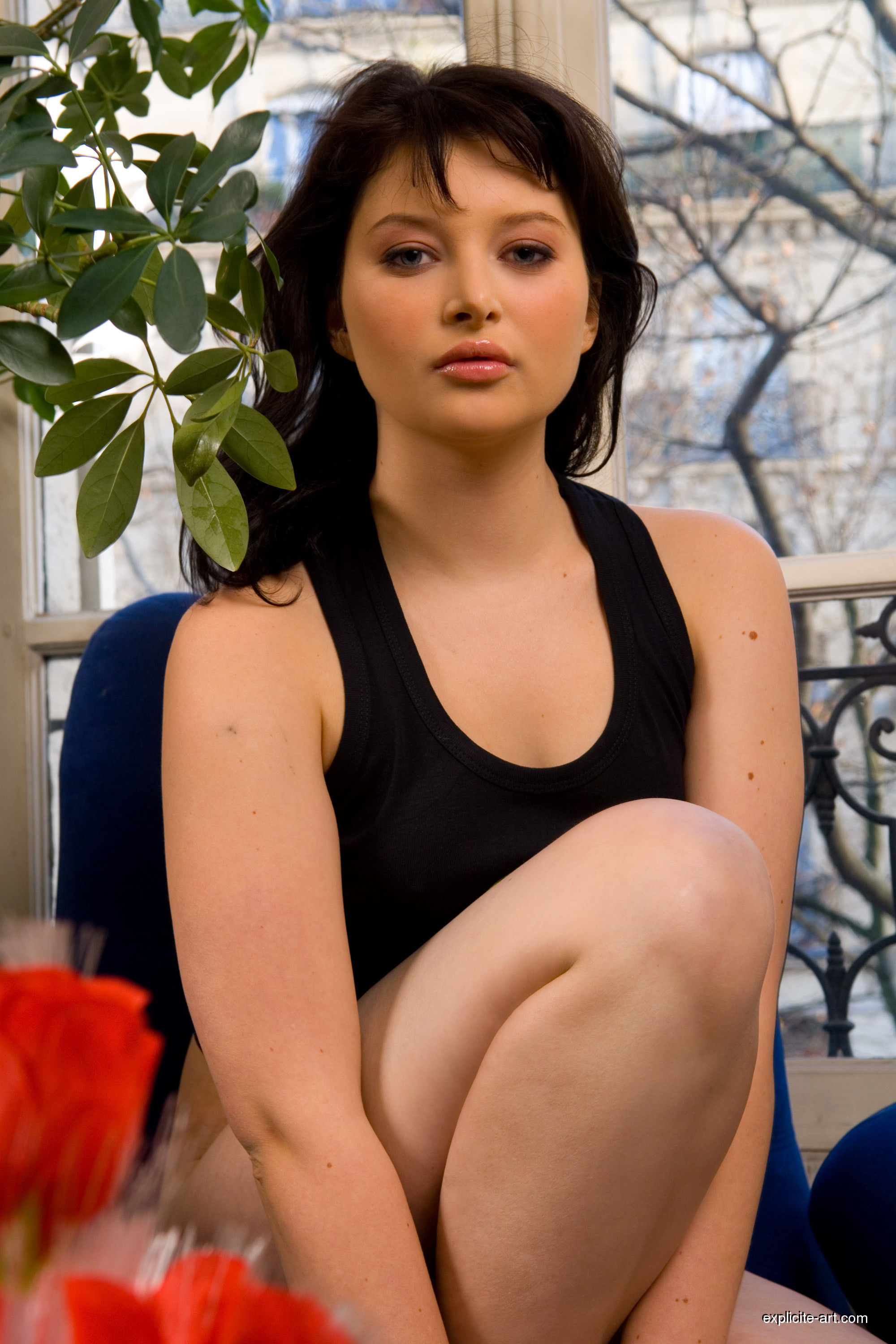
- Born: 1989 (age 36–37); Leningrad, Russian SFSR, Soviet Union
- Other names: Ana Polina, Lilith Marshall
- Height: 5 ft 8 in (1.73 m)
- Website: annapolina.com

Anna Polina (born 1989) is a Russian-French pornographic actress and erotic model.

== Career ==
Anna debuted in the adult industry in 2010; since then she has appeared in over 30 productions.

In 2010, Anna starred in the independent horror film Echap. In 2011 she appeared in two television documentaries about adult industry, France 2's Le Rhabillage and Direct 8's Star du X, comment en sortir indemne ?. In April 2012 she appeared in a campaign for the breast cancer prevention. She also appeared in advertisements of Yamaha number 69 driven by Hugo Payen in the 2012 Dakar Rally.

== Awards and nominations ==
List of accolades received by Anna Polina
Awards & nominations
Award	Won	Nominated
AVN Awards	1	7
XBIZ Awards	1	3
Venus Awards	1	0
- Total number of wins and nominations
Totals	3	10

Year	Ceremony	Category	Result	Work
2011	Venus	Best Newcomer Actress	Won	—N/a
2012	AVN	Female Foreign Performer of the Year	Nominated	—N/a
2012	XBIZ	Foreign Female Performer of the Year	Won	—N/a
2013	AVN	Female Foreign Performer of the Year	Nominated	—N/a
2013	AVN	Best Sex Scene in a Foreign-Shot Production	Nominated	Inglorious Bitches
2013	AVN	Best Sex Scene in a Foreign-Shot Production	Nominated	The Journalist
2013	XBIZ	Foreign Female Performer of the Year	Nominated	—N/a
2014	AVN	Best Sex Scene in a Foreign Shot Production	Won	The Ingenuous (shared with Aleska Diamond, Angel Piaff, Rita Peach, Tarra White and Mike Angelo)
2014	AVN	Best Sex Scene in a Foreign Shot Production	Nominated	Russian Institute 18: The Headmistress (shared with Nasta Zya and JPX)
2014	AVN	Female Foreign Performer of the Year	Nominated	—N/a
2014	XBIZ	Foreign Female Performer of the Year	Nominated	—N/a
2015	AVN	Best Sex Scene in a Foreign-Shot Production	Nominated	Footballers' Housewives (shared with Abbie Cat, Markus Tynai and Vince Carter)
2015	XBIZ	Foreign Female Performer of the Year	Nominated	—N/a
