= Tarra White =

Czech pornographic film actress (born 1987/1988)

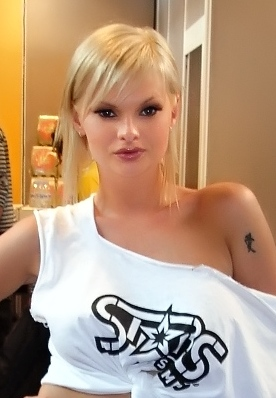
- White in 2007
- Born: 1987 or 1988 (age 38–39)

Tarra White (born 1987 or 1988) is a Czech former pornographic film actress and TV presenter. She began performing in adult films in the mid-2000s and later became a contract performer for Private Media Group.

At the 2009 Hot d'Or, she won Best European Actress Award and Best European Female Performer Award. Outside adult films, she also worked as a presenter of an erotic news programme for Czech broadcaster TV Nova.

== Career ==
White began performing in pornographic films around 2005, at the age of 18. Her first clips was shot about two days after her 18th birthday and her initial contact with the industry came through Czech performer Robert Rosenberg.

By 2008, White was one of Private Media Group's "Sexclusives" contract performers. Private promoted White and other Sexclusives through international appearances and individual performer blogs.

She had temporarily left the adult-film industry to present an online erotic news programme for TV Nova. Between 2009 and 2013, she was presenting Red News on the Czech television channel Fanda. In 2013, she published autobiography Porno a já (lit. 'Porn and me').

By 2025, she is described as a former pornographic film actress, no longer working in the industry.

== Awards ==
- 2008 FICEB Ninfa Award for Best Supporting Actress (Wild Waves – Woodman Entertainment)
- 2009 Hot d'Or Award for Best European Female Performer
- 2009 Hot d'Or Award for Best European Actress (Billionaire – Private Media)
- 2009 Erotixxx Award for Best European Actress
- 2010 Erotixxx Award for Best International Actress
- 2014 AVN Award for Best Sex Scene in a Foreign-Shot Production (The Ingenuous) (with Aleska Diamond, Anna Polina, Angel Piaff, Rita Peach and Mike Angelo)
