= Jia Lissa =

Russian pornographic film actress and model

- Джиа Лисса
- Born: Julia Chirkova; 1 September 1996 (age 30); Izhevsk, Russia
- Citizenship: Russia
- Occupation: Pornographic film actress
- Years active: 2017–present

Jia Lissa (Russian: Джиа Лисса) is a Russian pornographic film actress and erotic photography model. She has won numerous awards including the XBIZ Europa Award in the category Best Female Performer of the Year in 2020, the AVN Award in the category Best Foreign-Shot Group Sex Scene in 2020, and the AVN Award in the category Best International Anal Sex Scene in 2022.

== Career ==
Jia Lissa originally hails from Izhevsk and moved to Moscow in 2013 to pursue jobs. Immediately after reaching the age of 18, she began to perform as an amateur on webcams for the platforms MyFreeCams.com and LiveJasmin. She also worked as a waitress in restaurants.

Lissa began her career as a professional pornographic film actress in 2017, at the age of 21, by doing a masturbation scene for the Met-Art studio. During the start of her career, Lissa only acted in lesbian and masturbation scenes. In August 2018, she signed an exclusive contract with French entrepreneur Greg Lansky 's Vixen studio and began acting in scenes with men. She became the first European to sign contract with Vixen studio. In December the same year, Lissa did her first interracial sex scene for Blacked Studios. She received her first award nomination at the XBIZ Europe Awards, in the category of Best Lesbian Sex Scene. The following year, she was nominated in the same category as well as in the category of Best New Star and won the award for Best Glamor Sex Scene, along with Liya Silver and Alberto Blanco.

In 2020, Lissa gained recognition by being nominated at the AVN Awards for the newly created category Foreign Emerging Artist of the Year. She was also nominated for the awards for European productions in the categories Best Sex Scene in a Foreign Production and Best Foreign Production Group Lesbian Sex Scene. She was also nominated in the category Foreign Female Artist of the Year.

In September 2021, Lissa appeared in an anal sex scene for the first time. For this scene with Vixen studios, she received the AVN Awards in the category Best International Anal Scene in January 2022. In July 2022, Lissa and Liya Silver were elected as Vixen Angels. In August same year, she won the XBIZ Europa Award for the fourth time, winning in the category Best Sex Scene - Feature Film.

== Awards and nominations ==
Year	Ceremony	Result	Category	Film
2019	Spank Bank Award	Nominated	Masturbator of the Year	—N/a
2019	Spank Bank Award	Nominated	Ravishing Redhead of the Year	—N/a
2019	XBIZ Europa Award	Nominated	Best Sex Scene - Lesbian	Jia
2019	XBIZ Europa Award	Nominated	Best Sex Scene - Lesbian	Seduced by My Bestfriend
2019	XBIZ Europa Award	Nominated	Female Performer of the Year	—N/a
2020	AVN Award	Nominated	Best Foreign-Shot All-Girl Sex Scene	Glamorous 1: Stunning
2020	AVN Award	Won	Best Foreign-Shot Group Sex Scene	Blacked Raw 15
2020	AVN Award	Nominated	Best New Foreign Starlet	—N/a
2020	Spank Bank Award	Nominated	Most Photogenic Nymphomaniac	—N/a
2020	Spank Bank Award	Nominated	Ravishing Redhead of the Year	—N/a
2020	XBIZ Award	Nominated	Foreign Female Performer of the Year	—N/a
2020	XBIZ Europa Award	Nominated	Best Sex Scene - Glamcore	Club VXN Vacation
2020	XBIZ Europa Award	Nominated	Best Sex Scene - Lesbian	Seduced by My Bestfriend
2020	XBIZ Europa Award	Nominated	Best Sex Scene - Lesbian	Jia 4 You
2020	XBIZ Europa Award	Won	Female Performer of the Year	—N/a
2021	AVN Award	Nominated	Best Foreign-Shot All-Girl Sex Scene	Bad Girls 2: Lesbian Desires
2021	AVN Award	Nominated	Best Foreign-Shot Group Sex Scene	Together
2021	AVN Award	Nominated	Female Foreign Performer of the Year	—N/a
2021	XBIZ Europa Award	Nominated	Best Sex Scene - Lesbian	Perfect Date
2022	AVN Award	Won	Best International Anal Sex Scene	Jia
2022	AVN Award	Nominated	Best International Group Sex Scene	Jia
2022	AVN Award	Nominated	Best International Lesbian Sex Scene	Three Honey Bunnies
2022	AVN Award	Nominated	International Female Performer of the Year	—N/a
2022	XBIZ Europa Award	Nominated	Best Acting	Jia
2022	XBIZ Europa Award	Won	Best Sex Scene — Feature Movie	Jia
2023	AVN Award	Nominated	Best Actress - Featurette	Third Date
2023	AVN Award	Nominated	Best International All-Female Sex Scene	The Spanish Stallion: Lottie Magne vs. Jia Lissa, Scene 4
2023	AVN Award	Nominated	International Female Performer of the Year	—N/a
2023	XBIZ Europa Award	Won	Best Sex Scene — Gonzo	Irresistible Impulse
2023	XBIZ Europa Award	Nominated	Female Performer of the Year	—N/a
2024	AVN Award	Nominated	Best International Boy/Girl Sex Scene	Pornochic: Maya & Jia
