= Monica Mattos =

Brazilian former pornographic actress, director, dancer and television

- Other names: Monika Matos, Monica Matos, Moni
- Years active: 2003–13
- Website: monicamattosoficial.com.br

Monica Mattos is a Brazilian former pornographic actress, director, dancer and television presenter who began her film career in 2003 in Brazil and in 2005 in the United States.

== Career ==
=== Adult Films ===
She began her pornographic career under the influence of a friend who introduced her to a producer. She made around 300 films by several national and international producers during the ten years of a career that ended in 2013.

She was hired by the Brasileirinhas group. In Too Much is Never Enough, she was chosen by director Chris Streams to perform in all nine scenes.

In 2006, she created a controversy when appearing in a video where she performed oral sex on a horse. She later stated she didn't feel good about that scene.

In 2008, she became the first Latin American to win the AVN Award in the "Female Foreign Performer of the Year" category for her performance in Devassa. This award brought her visibility. She was interviewed on programs such as Programa do Jô, Conexão Reporter, Pânico and Amor e Sexo.

She was the host of a TV show called Uma Noite Para Paraíso on TVA's adult channel.

=== Outside of Porn ===
In 2010, Monica decided to retire from adult films and try to follow the same path previously taken by former pornographic stars like Jenna Jameson, Marilyn Chambers, and Traci Lords: acting as a scream queen in horror movies. In an interview at the time, she explained her love of the genre:

I've always loved horror movies since childhood, and never had any nightmares because of them. No, I always have fun watching them! I used to meet friends from school to watch movies, and we always chose horror movies. The funny part was to see everybody scared to death while I was laughing all the way through. I never imagined that one day I would become an actress in horror films, but when I received the first invitation it was like a dream coming true!

Between 2011 and 2014 Monica Mattos starred in the short films Zombeach (2011), directed by Newton Uzeda; Driller Killer (2011), by Rodrigo Freire, Red Hookers (2012), by Larissa Anzoategui, and O Estripador da Rua Augusta aka The Augusta Street Ripper (2014), directed by Felipe M. Guerra and Geisla Fernandes. In these films, she played vampires, zombies, and victims of psychopaths, showing her body in nude scenes, but always avoiding sex scenes (even softcore). Taking advantage of her fame and her cult following, she also appeared in some music videos.

In the following years, Monica joined the cast of the feature films Steve Cicco - Missão Popoviski (2015) and Exorcistas Carinhosos (2017), directed by Vinicius J. Santos, and was one of the protagonists of Astaroth, Female Demon (2018), by Larissa Anzoategui. Afterward, she retired also from genre films and left cinema for good.

Withdrawn from the artistic life since then, today Monica is married and raises her new family away from the spotlight.

== Non-erotic movies ==
- 2011: Zombeach
- 2011: Driller Killer
- 2013: Red Hookers
- 2014: O Estripador da Rua Augusta
- 2015: Steve Cicco - Missão Popoviski
- 2017: Exorcistas Carinhosos

== Partial filmography ==
- 2010: Mulheres Que Traem 6
- 2009: 1ª Experiências Bi
- 2008: My Brown Eyed Girl 2
- 2007: Viva Latina
- 2007: Devassa
- 2007: Violadas Ao Extremo 11
- 2006: Brazilian Girlfriends
- 2006: Bi-Bi Brazil
- 2005: Carnaval 2005
- 2005: Sonhos Proibidos
- 2005: Blistering Blowjobs #7
- 2004: Carnaval Verão Vale-Tudo

== Awards ==
Year	Result	Award	Film
2007	Won	Adam Film World Guide Award – Best Latin Starlet	—N/a
2007	Nominated	AVN Award – Female Foreign Performer of the Year	—N/a
2008	Won	AVN Award – Female Foreign Performer of the Year	—N/a
2014	Won	PIP (Sexy Hot Award) - Best Double Penetration Sex Scene	Meninas Más
