= Martin Čepček =

Slovak politician

Member of the National Council
- Incumbent
- Assumed office 20 March 2020

Personal details
- Born: 24 November 1978 (age 47) Nitra, Czechoslovakia (now Slovakia)
- Party: Ordinary People and Independent Personalities (2020–2021); Independent (2021–)
- Education: University of Ss. Cyril and Methodius

Martin Čepček (born 24 November 1978) is a Slovak activist and politician. He has served as a member of the National Council since 2020.

== Early life and career ==
Čepček was born on 24 November 1978 in Nitra. He studied pedagogy at University of Ss. Cyril and Methodius and worked as a teacher for several years after graduation. From 2011 he has been a director of a large church-affiliated children center. Since the mid-2010s, Čepček has been active as an activist against gambling, abortion and the Istanbul Convention.

== Political career ==
Čepček was elected to parliament in the 2020 Slovak parliamentary election on the list of Ordinary People and Independent Personalities (OĽaNO).

In 2021 the OĽaNO MPs voted to exclude Čepček for repeatedly proposing the law banning abortion without informing the party about his intention beforehand and for supporting extreme right proposals in the parliament.

Following his exclusion from OĽaNO, Čepček remained in the parliament as an independent member. He proposed several laws aimed against abortion and women's rights. In April 2023, Čepček proposed limiting access to pornography only to adults who sign a request to access such content certified by a notary.
