= Jessie Rogers =

Pornographic film actress

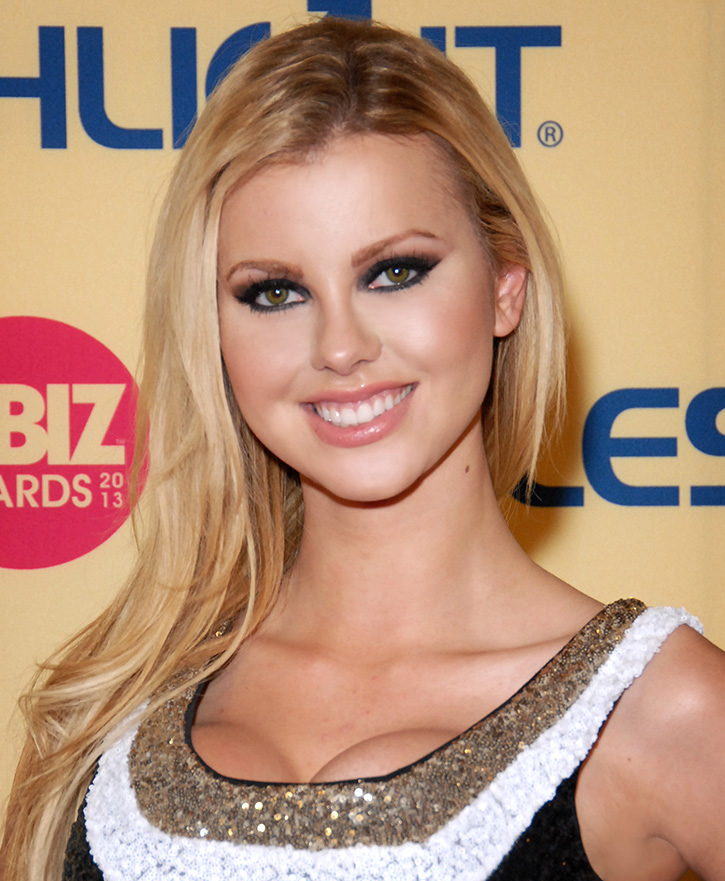
- Rogers in 2013
- Born: Goiânia, Goiás, Brazil
- Occupation: Pornographic film actress

Jessie Rogers is a Brazilian-American pornographic film actress.

== Early life ==
Jessie Rogers was born on August 8, 1993, in Goiânia, Brazil and relocated to the United States at the age of six. She attended El Camino High School in South San Francisco, California in 2008. She did some mainstream modeling in New York prior to her adult film career.

== Career ==
=== Pornographic film career ===
Rogers debuted in the adult film industry a few days after her eighteenth birthday in August 2011. In 2012, she had a breast augmentation, taking her from an A to a D cup. That same year, she portrayed Emma Bunton ("Baby Spice") in an adult film parody of British girl group the Spice Girls.

== Personal life ==
=== Activism ===
Rogers became an advocate for mandatory condom use in pornographic films and workers' compensation for performers shortly after her retirement. On April 24, 2013, she appeared at the California State Assembly's Labor and Employment Committee and testified in support of AB 332, a bill requiring pornographic film actors to wear condoms during all sex scenes filmed in California.

== Awards and nominations ==
Year	Ceremony	Result	Award	Work
2012	NightMoves Award	Nominated	Best New Starlet	—N/a
2013	AVN Award	Nominated	Best New Starlet	—N/a
2013	XBIZ Award	Nominated	Best New Starlet	—N/a
2013	Spank Bank Award	Won	Sexiest Woman Alive	—N/a
2013	XRCO Award	Nominated	Cream Dream	—N/a
2013	NightMoves Award	Won	Best Ass (Fan's Choice)	—N/a
2014	XBIZ Award	Nominated	Best Scene – Parody Release (with Misty Stone & Xander Corvus)	OMG...It's the Spice Girls XXX Parody
2014	NightMoves Award	Nominated	Best Butt	—N/a
2024	AVN Award	Nominated	Favorite Porn Star Creator	—N/a
2024	AVN Award	Nominated	Hottest Anal Creator Collab (with Tommy King & Dredd)	—N/a
2024	AVN Award	Nominated	Most Amazing Ass	—N/a
2024	AVN Award	Nominated	Supreme Solo Content Creator	—N/a
2024	Adult Empire Award	Won	Comeback Star of the Year	—N/a
2025	AVN Award	Nominated	Favorite Female Porn Star	—N/a
2025	AVN Award	Nominated	Most Amazing Ass	—N/a
2025	XMA Creator Award	Nominated	Threesome Collab Clip of the Year (with Gizelle Blanco & Jax Slayher)	—N/a
2025	Urban X Award	Won	Best Anal Performer	—N/a
