= Lola Taylor =

Russian blogger and pornographic actress

- Born: Lyubov Aleksandrovna Bushueva; Ishim, Russia
- Occupation: Pornographic actress

Lola Taylor (born Lyubov Aleksandrovna Bushueva) is a Russian blogger and pornographic actress. She is a winner of the Spank Bank Awards and a nominee for the AVN Awards and Venus Awards.

== Biography ==
=== Early years ===
Lyubov Aleksandrovna Bushueva was born in Ishim, Tyumen Oblast. She grew up without her parents. After school, she enrolled in a local technical college to study computer science. After graduating from technical college, she worked as a librarian. She left her hometown for Krasnouralsk to help her sick grandmother, and there she began working in an optician's shop. She then moved to Yekaterinburg, where she began offering massage services. At the same time, she began traveling extensively and participating in film shoots in Europe, which led to her dismissal from the massage salon.

=== Pornographic film career ===
In an interview, she stated that she did not receive high fees for filming in erotic films — for her, it was “a way of self-realization and raising her rating”. As the actress later explained, “I went there only for financial reasons, to make a name for myself”.

According to her own account, the inspiration for her pseudonym Lola Taylor came from Vladimir Nabokov's novel Lolita. Lyubov wanted to be like Lolita, but the producers shortened the pseudonym to Lola.

In 2015, after a trip to Amsterdam, inspired by Van Gogh's work, Bushueva became fascinated with painting. She paints some of her pictures using pubic hair. Bushueva held an exhibition of her paintings in Yekaterinburg. In the same year, she took part in the TV show “Zvanyy Uzhyn” (Dinner Party), where she admitted that she was cooking for the first time. In 2017, she wrote a book about her experience working in the porn industry.

In 2020, in an interview, she said that she had set up an escort business, accompanying wealthy men herself and also selecting other girls for them. In December 2020, she wanted to take part in the show “Let's Get Married!”, but did not pass the casting.

=== Personal life ===
In 2023, she announced on her VKontakte page her intention to leave pornography and become a mother. In 2024, during the filming of an erotic scene, she was hospitalized with a nervous breakdown. She had previously reported her mental health problems on social media. Among the possible causes of her neurosis, she mentioned taking Chinese diet pills and ADHD.

In an interview with URA.ru, she stated that she was afraid to return to her hometown because of its residents, who did not share her views on her field of activity.

=== Sexual violence ===
Bushueva was sexually assaulted several times. In 2014, she met two men on social media who invited her to visit them. When the actress arrived at the address, they handcuffed her and assaulted her. Bushueva had to jump out of a third-floor window to escape her attackers.

In July 2020, she recounted a nighttime rendezvous with soccer players Andrei Arshavin and Vladimir Bystrov. According to her, after the party, she was invited to a room where Arshavin suggested group sex. Before engaging in intimacy, the actress requested to take a selfie, which was met with a negative reaction, and one of the participants attempted to seize her phone.

On the night of September 30, 2020, Bushueva reported that while vacationing on a yacht in Gelendzhik, she and her friend were raped by three men. The Communists of Russia responded to the incident. Party members demanded that the police not accept Bushueva's rape report. According to party secretary Sergei Malinkovich, the actress herself should be held accountable for appearing in erotic films.

== Media performances ==
In 2020, while in quarantine due to the COVID-19 pandemic, she recorded a message in which she promised intimate relations to whoever created a cure for the coronavirus.

In 2021, she told reporters that she was frightened by men who devote their lives to martial arts, believing that such people are prone to uncontrollable outbursts of aggression. Among the dangerous athletes, the actress named MMA fighter Artem Tarasov, who responded to her statement by inviting her to his training session. During the meeting at the training session, Bushueva promised the fighter a “night workout” if he won his upcoming fight.

In 2022, with the start of the war in Ukraine, she recorded a video message in which she offered Ukrainian President Volodymyr Zelenskyy to “lay down his arms” in exchange for intimacy with her, stating that this would stop the war, “which no one needs.”

In 2024, Kazakh rapper Jah Khalib found himself at the center of a scandal after Bushueva published message with the artist online, in which he demanded sex from her.

== Awards and nominations ==
Year	Award	Category	Work	Result
2015	AVN Awards	Female Foreign Performer of the Year	—	Nominated
2015	Spank Bank Awards	Imported Temptress of the Year	—	Nominated
2015	Spank Bank Awards	Two Hot Dogs in a Hallway	—	Nominated
2016	Venus Awards	Beste Darstellerin	—	Nominated
2017	AVN Awards	Best Sex Scene in a Foreign-Shot Production	Lea Guerlin First Night in the Girls' Dormitory (2016)	Nominated
2017	Spank Bank Awards	Imported Temptress of the Year	—	Nominated
2018	Spank Bank Awards	Best Body Built For Sin	—	Nominated
2018	Spank Bank Awards	Best Booty	—	Nominated
2018	Spank Bank Awards	Best Smile	—	Nominated
2018	Spank Bank Awards	Countess of Contortionism	—	Nominated
2018	Spank Bank Awards	My (Wet) Dream Girl	—	Nominated
2018	Spank Bank Technical Awards	Best Piercing	—	Won
2018	Venus Awards	Bestes Internationales Show Girl	—	Nominated
2019	AVN Awards	Best Foreign-Shot Anal Sex Scene	Police Harassment (2017)	Nominated
2019	Spank Bank Awards	Most Awe Inspiring Gape	—	Nominated
2019	Spank Bank Awards	Three Kielbasas in a Corridor (Triple Anal Pundit)	—	Nominated

== Bibliography ==
- 123 tips from porn star Lyubov Bushueva
