= Niki Belucci =

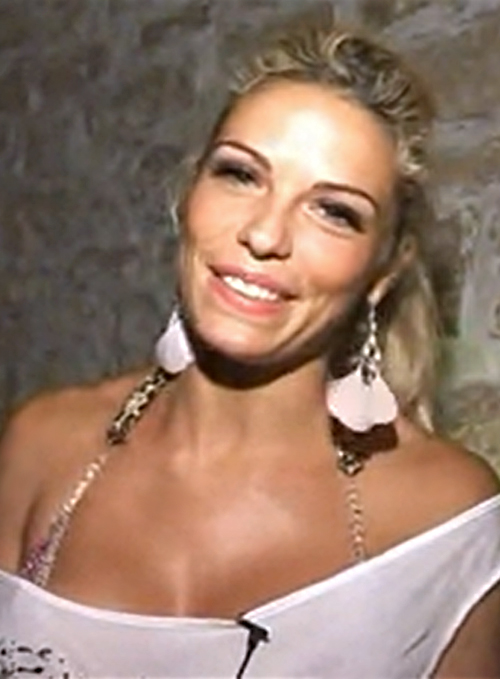
- Belucci as a DJ in 2010

Background information
- Born: Nikolett Pósán; 10 March 1983 (age 43); Budapest, Hungary
- Genre: House
- Occupations: DJ; pornographic actress
- Years active: 2002–present

Niki Belucci (born Nikolett Pósán, on 10 March 1983) is a Hungarian DJ and former pornographic actress.

== Biography ==
Born in Budapest, at a young age Belucci practised gymnastics and won several medals in youth competitions, before stopping at the age of 15 years because of a serious injury. She later got a diploma in hotel management school and, at the age of 19 years, started working first as a nude model and later as a pornographic actress. Belucci eventually left the porn industry shortly after getting married. During her adult career, she starred in about thirty films.

Belucci started her career as a DJ in 2003, collaborating with two Hungarian DJs, Spigiboy and DJ Mozsó, and embarking on a tour called the "Orgasmic Tour" as a tribute to her adult career. During her musical career, she made a worldwide tour and released a mix-album and several singles. In 2010, she was the resident DJ of the Amnesia nightclub in Ibiza.

== Awards and nominations ==
- 2005 AVN Award nominee – Female Foreign Performer of the Year
- 2005 AVN Award nominee – Best Sex Scene in a Foreign-Shot Production (The Voyeur 26) with Tiffany Diamond & Nick Lang
