= Pornography in Brazil =

Pornography in Brazil with explicit sex scenes began in the modern era after the lifting of the censorship of the military regime in Brazil.

During the period of censorship, there was an erotic genre pornochanchada, a genre that was compared to the porn genre but did not have explicit sex scenes due to censorship during the time of the military regime in Brazil. After the political opening, there were more explicit sex scenes, and pornochanchada went bankrupt.

== Pornochanchada ==
During the 1970s and 1980s, pornochanchada had a significant impact on the Brazilian cinema. This genre featured prominent actresses such as Vera Fischer, Helena Ramos, Adriana Prieto, among others. Generally, this genre was produced in the Boca do Lixo, a place where films like Mulher, Mulher, Os Paqueras and A Dama da Zona, among others, were produced without any explicit sex scenes.

This genre received support from the military government, which created the National Cinema Institute in 1966, succeeded by Embrafilme in 1969, and was also supported by organizations such as CONCINE, created in 1973, and laws aimed at stimulating and protecting national cinema.

The genre declined due to the economic crisis in the 1980s, which put producers of this genre in a complicated financial situation. The military regime reduced censorship on films, and foreign companies, seeing this, exported their films to Brazil. These films attracted male audiences, and Brazilian companies mass-produced films of this genre, which did not attract Brazilian audiences as much as foreign films did.

The situation of Brazilian cinema worsened with the Collor Era, with the end of laws that incentivized national film production and the dissolution of organisations like Embrafilme and CONCINE.

== Present day ==
There are Brazilian companies like Brasileirinhas and Sexxxy World that produce pornographic films in Brazil. Brasileirinhas is the largest film producer in Brazil and features actresses such as Júlia Paes and Monica Mattos, among others.

In November 2013, Brasileirinhas stopped releasing DVDs and started selling films exclusively online. One of the reasons was the sharp decline in sales since 2007. Other brands, such as Explícita Vídeos, Sexxxy, Buttman, and Planet Sex, ceased production to avoid bankruptcy. This is due to the growth of online pornography, and as a result, companies must consider an internet-based market and the possibilities of a portable platform.

In 1992, about eight million copies of pornographic magazines were believed to be sold in Brazil, while one in four Brazilians of both sexes had watched an explicit sex movie. In a 1994 survey, this number increased slightly for women and doubled for men.
