= Aleska Diamond =

Hungarian acrobat and former pornographic actress

- Born: Emese Sáfrány; 6 August 1988 (age 38); Komló, Baranya, Hungary
- Other names: Aleksa Diamond; Alexa
- Occupations: Acrobatic gymnast; aerial gymnastics instructor; former porn actress; former call girl
- Years active: 2014–present (gymnast); 2008–2013 (adult film actress)
- Partner: Ádám Hornyák (2018–2022)
- Children: 1
- Website: aleskaaerial.com

Emese Sáfrány (born 6 August 1988), known by her stage name Aleska Diamond, is a Hungarian acrobatic gymnast, aerial gymnastics instructor, former pornographic actress, and former call girl. She won the AVN Award for female foreign performer of the year in 2012 and 2013.

== Career ==
Diamond started to work in the porn business in 2008. In 2012 and 2013, she won the AVN Award for female foreign performer of the year. She left the industry in 2013 (although she was still contractually obliged to perform in 2014), and has since been professionally working as an instructor for aerial acrobatics, as well as competing professionally. She earned a silver medal in aerial hoop at the 2016 World Championship of Air Power Athletics in Riga. She was only three points behind the gold medalist.

== Awards and nominations ==
Year	Award	Result	Category	Work
2011	AVN Award	Nominated	Female Foreign Performer of the Year	—N/a
2011	Dorcel Vision Award	Nominated	Best International Actress	—N/a
2011	Galaxy Award	Nominated	Pre-nominees Europe: Best Female Performer	—N/a
2011	Galaxy Award	Nominated	Pre-nominees Europe: Best Scene (with David Perry and Nick Lang)	New Look Same Bitch
2011	Galaxy Award	Nominated	Pre-nominees America: Best Scene (with Sean Michaels and Wesley Pipes)	Aleska Diamond Interracial
2012	AVN Award	Won	Female Foreign Performer of the Year	—N/a
2012	Dorcel Vision Award	Nominated	Best International Actress	—N/a
2012	Galaxy Award	Nominated	Pre-nominees Europe: Best Female Performer	—N/a
2012	Orgazmik Award	Nominated	Best Female Performer	—N/a
2012	SHAFTA Award	Nominated	Foreign Performer of the Year	—N/a
2012	XBIZ Award	Nominated	Foreign Female Performer of the Year	—N/a
2013	AVN Award	Won	Female Foreign Performer of the Year	—N/a
2013	AVN Award	Nominated	Best Sex Scene in a Foreign-Shot Production (with Anastasia Devine, Anna Polina, Cindy Dollar, Defrancesca Gallardo, Katy, Nataly, Jenna Lovely, Lucy Bell, Niki Sweet, Silvie De Lux, Suzie Carina, Valleria, Pavel Matous, George Uhl, Marcio Gonzales, Leny Ewil, Steve Q. & JJ)	Inglorious Bitches
2013	XBIZ Award	Nominated	Foreign Female Performer of the Year	—N/a
2014	AVN Award	Won	Best Sex Scene in a Foreign-Shot Production (with Anna Polina, Angel Piaff, Rita Peach, Tarra White and Mike Angelo)	The Ingenuous
2014	XBIZ Award	Nominated	Foreign Female Performer of the Year	—N/a
