= Pornography in France =

Pornography in France is legal with restrictions. Softcore pornography is restricted to people 16 and over, and hardcore pornography is not allowed to be sold to minors under 18. Violent or graphic pornography is rated X and are not allowed for display to minors, and are shown in special theatres. Some pornography has a special VAT: a 33% tax is levied on X-rated movies, and a 50% excise is placed on pornographic online services.

== History ==
In 1923, France signed the International Convention for the Suppression of the Circulation of and Traffic in Obscene Publications, pledging to outlaw obscene materials.

In 1974, newly elected French President Valéry Giscard d'Estaing announced the end of government censorship of pornography, allowing the vastly successful softcore film Emmanuelle to appear in cinemas across the country. In 1975 the "Loi X" was announced which established a classification "X" for hard-core pornography, adding a special 20% tax on these movies, preventing minors from viewing them and restricting their showing to X-rated adult cinemas.

Since 2020, pornographic websites located outside the European Union have been required to prevent minors from viewing their content by employing age verification systems; in 2024 several sites that did not comply were blocked. Since June 2025, the requirement also applies to pornographic websites located inside the European Union. In response, several major porn sites blocked access from France.

== Parental controls ==
A mandatory age control for pornographic websites has been approved by the French government, in order to prevent minors from accessing pornographic content. The average age for an individual first being exposed to pornography is 13. During a speech at UNESCO, French president Emmanuel Macron said: “We do not take a 13-year-old boy to a sex-shop, not anything goes in the digital world." Some children, however, have first consumed pornography as early as 8. Macron warned that websites will be given a period of six months for parental control to be set up by default, and if not, a law for automatic parental control will be passed. According to Metacert, there are currently 5.5 million pornographic websites in France alone. Macron also started that "sexuality is built on stereotypes."

== Child pornography ==
Child pornography is illegal in France. The maximum penalty for using and distributing child pornography is 7 years imprisonment and a €100,000 fine.

In 31 October 2025, Shein who is a Chinese fashion company faced severe criticism over publishing the childlike sex doll that holds a teddy bear and pulled out from the website, but the French government are threatening to ban Shein if it re-appears again, company executives could also face 7 years in prison and hefty fines.

== Film and pornography ==
The rating system has caused controversy. In 2000, the sexually explicit and violent film Baise-moi was initially rated only as "restricted" by the French government. This classification was overturned by a Conseil d'État ruling in a lawsuit brought by associations supporting Christian and family values.

Some movies are forbidden to minors under 18, without the X-rating, like Baise-moi, Ken Park and Saw 3, so that these movies can be viewed in theaters and not attract VAT.

== Sexual abuse ==
It has been alleged that the pornography industry in France systematically uses violence against women. According to a 2022 report Hell behind the scenes presented by four French senators Annick Billon, Laurence Rossignol, Alexandra Borchio-Fontimp and Laurence Cohen. It contained claims such as "Sexual, physical and verbal abuse is widespread in porn,” write the authors, who consider it systemic. The violence is “not faked, but very real for the women who are filming." They also argued for proper judicial process about this matter.

== See also ==
- Marquis de Sade
