= Samantha Bentley =

English pornographic film actress, musician and writer (born 1988/1989)

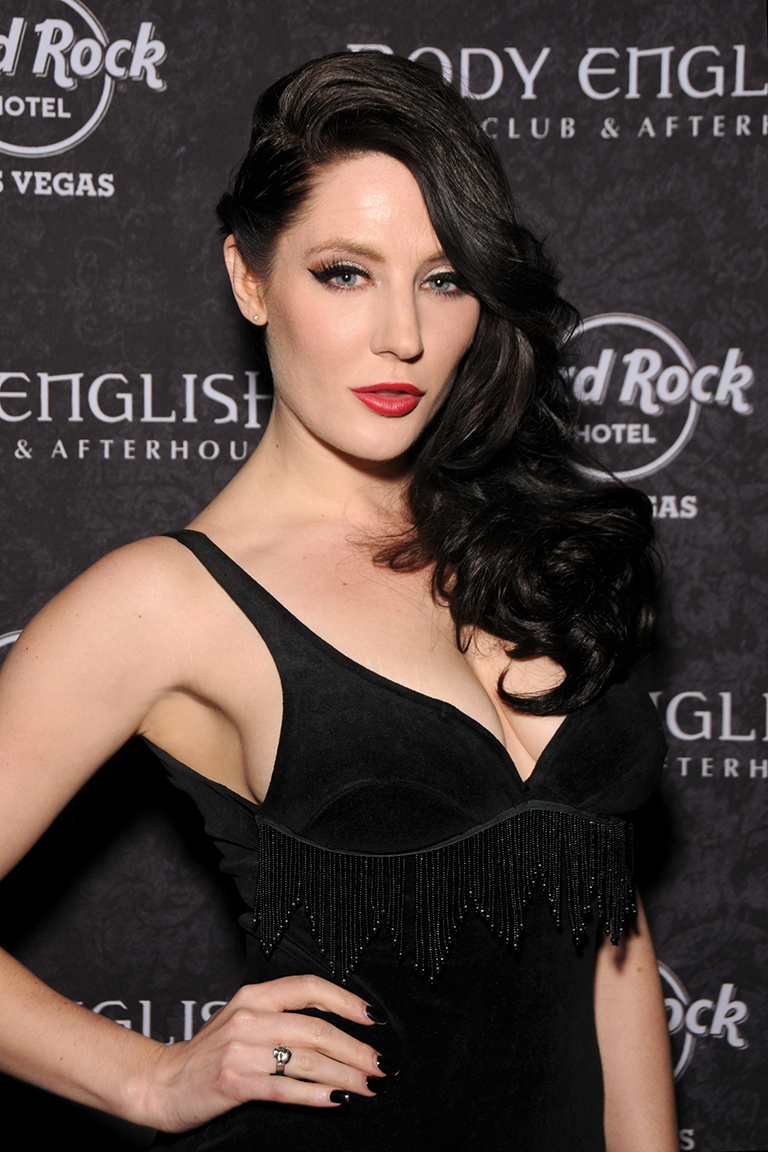
- Bentley in 2014
- Born: 1988 or 1989 (age 37–38)
- Occupations: Pornographic film actress; musician; writer

Samantha Bentley (born 1988 or 1989) is an English former pornographic film actress, musician and writer.

== Early life ==
Bentley worked as a stripper whilst attending university, where she studied design, before working in pornography.

== Career ==
Bentley started glamour modelling when she was around 18 or 19 years old and has appeared in Page 3 of The Sun. She began by filming her own amateur videos, which are no longer in her possession. She initially worked for two years in girl/girl scenes only. Her first boy/girl scene was with Ian Tate for Harmony Films in 2012. This was also her first anal sex scene. She was the Penthouse Pet of the Month for August 2015.

== Mainstream media appearances ==
Bentley played a prostitute in the fourth season of the HBO series Game of Thrones, appearing in a bath scene opposite Davos Seaworth, who is played by Liam Cunningham. In April 2015, it was announced that Bentley will also appear in the show's fifth season. She has also appeared in a music video for Wiz Khalifa and in a mainstream film titled Look of Love. On 19 August 2014, Cosmopolitan UK published an article titled "14 weird questions about life as a porn star, answered by professionals", in which Bentley is featured. On 7 February 2016, she penned a blog for The Huffington Post titled "Women Against Feminism – A Pornstar's Point of View", in which she criticised feminists who slut-shame porn actresses, and has also written for Jerrick Media talking about sex, porn, geek culture, yoga and health.

== Other ventures ==
On 16 April 2015, Bentley made her DJing debut at Total Uprawr in the London Borough of Camden. She also plays classical piano. She joined a PETA campaign in protest against the Russian Space Agency's plan to send four macaque monkeys to Mars in 2017, in which she was laid in a pool of fake blood while wearing body paint that depicted her as a monkey in a space helmet outside of the Embassy of Russia in London on 13 January 2016.

== Awards and nominations ==
Year	Ceremony	Result	Award	Work	
2013	Paul Raymond Award	Won	British Model of the Year	—N/a	
2013	Paul Raymond Award	Won	Female Performer of the Year	—N/a	
2013	AVN Award	Won	Best All-Girl Group Sex Scene (with Brooklyn Lee & Ruth Medina)	Brooklyn Lee: Nymphomaniac	
2013	SHAFTA Award	Nominated	Best New Starlet	—N/a	
2013	UKAP Award	Won	Best Female Performer	—N/a	
2014	Paul Raymond Award	Won	Female Performer of the Year	—N/a	
2014	AVN Award	Nominated	Female Foreign Performer of the Year	—N/a	
2014	XBIZ Award	Nominated	Foreign Female Performer of the Year	—N/a	
2015	Paul Raymond Award	Won	Men Only Cover Girl of the Year	—N/a	
2015	AVN Award	Won	Best Sex Scene in a Foreign-Shot Production (with Henessy & Rocco Siffredi)	Rocco's Perfect Slaves 2	
2015	AVN Award	Nominated	Female Foreign Performer of the Year	—N/a	
2015	XBIZ Award	Nominated	Foreign Female Performer of the Year	—N/a	
2015	2016	AVN Award	Nominated	Best Sex Scene in a Foreign-Shot Production (with Misha Cross, Luke Hotrod & Maximilian Gambero)	Pretty Little Playthings
Nominated	2016	AVN Award	Female Foreign Performer of the Year	—N/a	
XBIZ Award	2016	Nominated	Foreign Female Performer of the Year	—N/a	
SHAFTA Award	2016	Nominated	Female Performer Of The Year	—N/a	
Paul Raymond Award	2016	Nominated	Best Girl Girl Duo (with Lucia Love)	Escort magazine	
Paul Raymond Award	2016	Nominated	Men Only Cover Girl of the Year	—N/a	
Paul Raymond Award	2016	Nominated	Escort Cover Girl of the Year	—N/a	
Paul Raymond Award	2016	Nominated	PRP Girl of the Year	—N/a	
Paul Raymond Award	2016	Won	Adult Film Of The Year	Hard In Love	
2017	2016	AVN Award	Nominated	Best Sex Scene in a Foreign-Shot Production (with Valentina Nappi, Samia Duarte & Rocco Siffredi)	Rocco's Italian Porn Bootcamp 2
2017	Nominated	AVN Award	Female Foreign Performer of the Year	—N/a	
2017	Nominated	AVN Award	Mainstream Star of the Year	—N/a	
2017	Nominated	AVN Award	Best Actress	Hard in Love	
2017	Nominated	AVN Award	Best Marketing Campaign for an Individual Project	Hard in Love	
2017	XBIZ Award	Nominated	Foreign Female Performer of the Year	—N/a	
2017	XBIZ Award	Nominated	Best Actress All Girl Release	Hard in Love 2	
2017	XBIZ Award	Nominated	Best All Girl Release	Hard in Love 1	
2017	XBIZ Award	Nominated	Best All Girl Release	Hard in Love 2	

== See also ==
- List of British pornographic film actors
