= 29th AVN Awards =

US adult industry award ceremony in 2012

- Date: January 21, 2012
- Site: The Joint; Hard Rock Hotel and Casino, Paradise, Nevada
- Hosted by: Dave Attell; Bree Olson; Sunny Leone
- Preshow hosts: Jesse Jane; Kirsten Price; Dave Navarro; Kayden Kross; Jessie Andrews
- Produced by: Gary D. Miller; Eric Mittleman
- Directed by: Gary D. Miller

Highlights
- Best Picture: Portrait of a Call Girl
- Most awards: The Rocki Whore Picture Show: A Hardcore Parody (9)
- Most nominations: The Rocki Whore Picture Show: A Hardcore Parody (18)

Television coverage
- Network: Showtime
- Duration: 1 hour, 50 minutes

The 29th AVN Awards ceremony, presented by Adult Video News, honored the best pornographic movies and adult entertainment products of 2011 of the United States and took place January 21, 2012, at a new venue, The Joint inside the Hard Rock Hotel and Casino in Paradise, Nevada. Movies or products released between Oct. 1, 2010 and Sept. 30, 2011 were eligible. The ceremony was televised in the United States by Showtime. Comedian Dave Attell hosted the show for the second time. He first presided over the 27th ceremony held in 2010, and shared the 29th ceremony with co-hosts Bree Olson and Sunny Leone. The awards show was held together with the Adult Entertainment Expo and Internext at the same venue.

On January 11, 2012, AVN announced in a press release that for the first time the AVN Awards ceremony would climax with "the presentation of an all-encompassing grand accolade," Movie of the Year. "Even since the beginning, when we presented separate awards for Best Film and Best Video Feature, there's been no definitive AVN Award equivalent to Best Picture. Now we have one," said AVN senior editor Peter Warren. Rather than nominees, contenders would be chosen from the winners in the categories of: Best All-Sex Release, Best All-Sex Release – Mixed Format, Best All-Girl Release, Best Gonzo Release, Best Vignette Release, Best Comedy, Best Feature, Best Foreign Feature, Best Parody – Comedy and Best Parody – Drama. Voting for Movie of the Year would be conducted just prior to the January 21 ceremony, in a secret meeting of core members of the AVN Awards committee, to ensure winners of the 10 categories remain secret until their presentation. The event would also unveiled a new annual award, the Visionary Award, "created to recognize and honor a leader in adult entertainment who has propelled innovation and taken his company—and the business as a whole—to new heights."

The Rocki Whore Picture Show: A Hardcore Parody and Asa Akira Is Insatiable 2 won the most awards, nine and seven respectively, but the Movie of the Year award went to Portrait of a Call Girl. Portrait also won for Best Feature, Best Actress for Jessie Andrews and Best Director — Feature for Graham Travis. Rocki Whore won Best Director—Parody for Brad Armstrong, Best Screenplay—Parody for Armstrong and Hank Shenanigan and Best Parody — Comedy, among others. Insatiable 2 won Best All-Sex Release, Best Director — Non Feature for Mason and several best sex scene awards for Asa Akira and her co-stars. Individually, Akira won or shared six awards, but the coveted Female Performer of the Year and Best New Starlet awards went to Bobbi Starr and Brooklyn Lee respectively. Lee took home five awards on the night and four went to Starr. Manuel Ferrara won his fourth Male Performer of the Year award, more than anyone else in the event's 29-year history.

== Winners and nominees ==
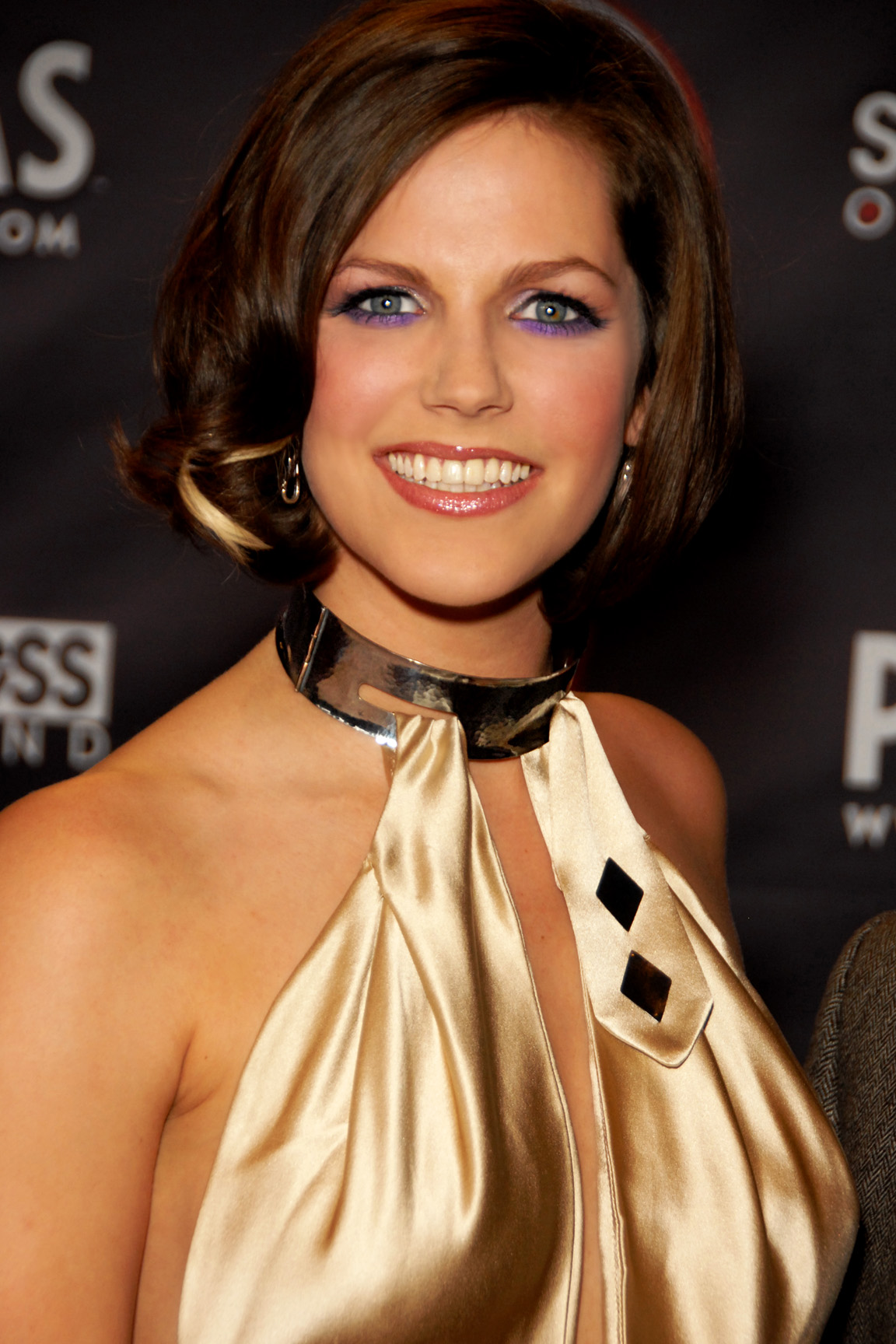
Bobbi Starr, Female Performer of the Year winner

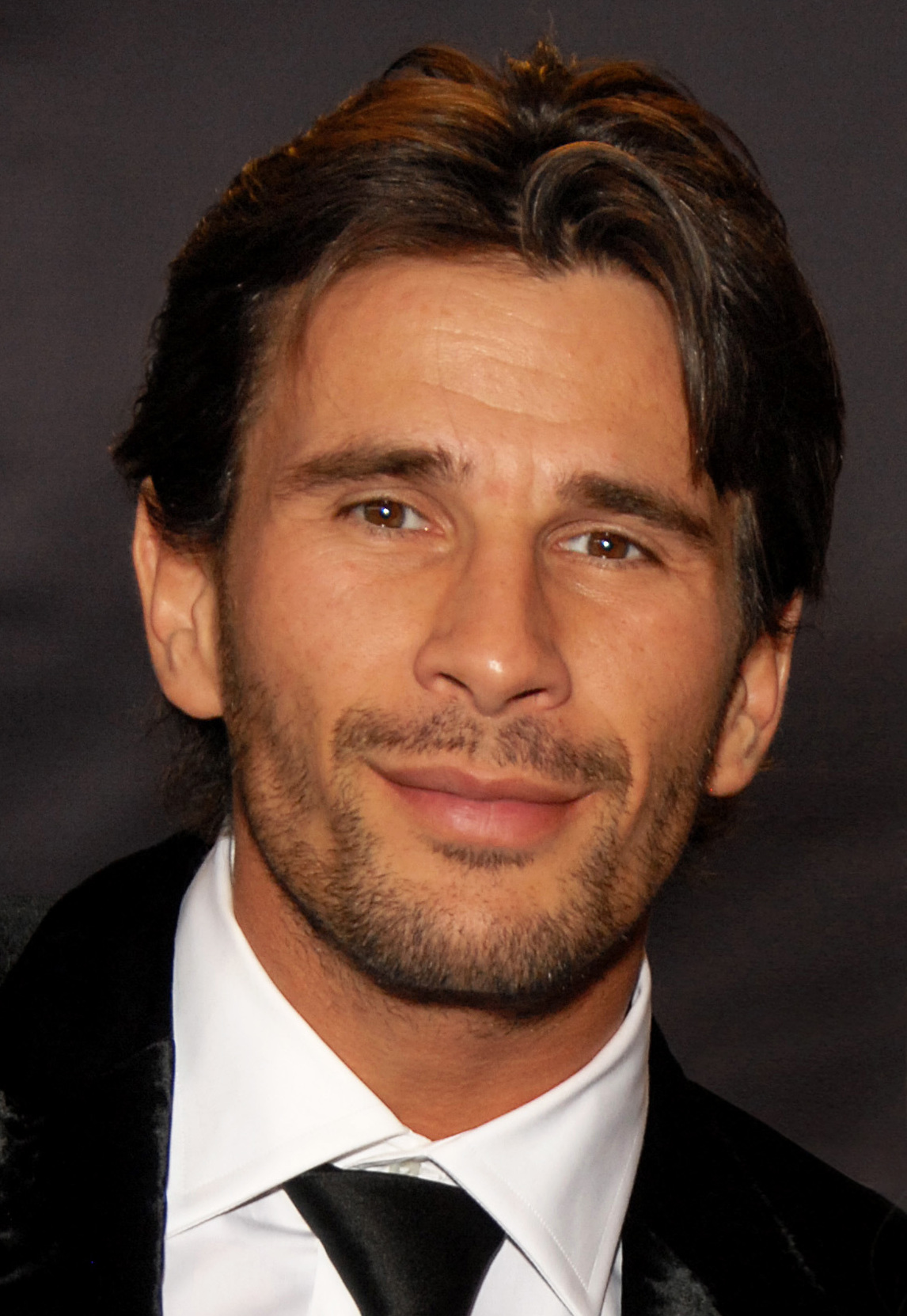
Manuel Ferrara, Male Performer of the Year winner

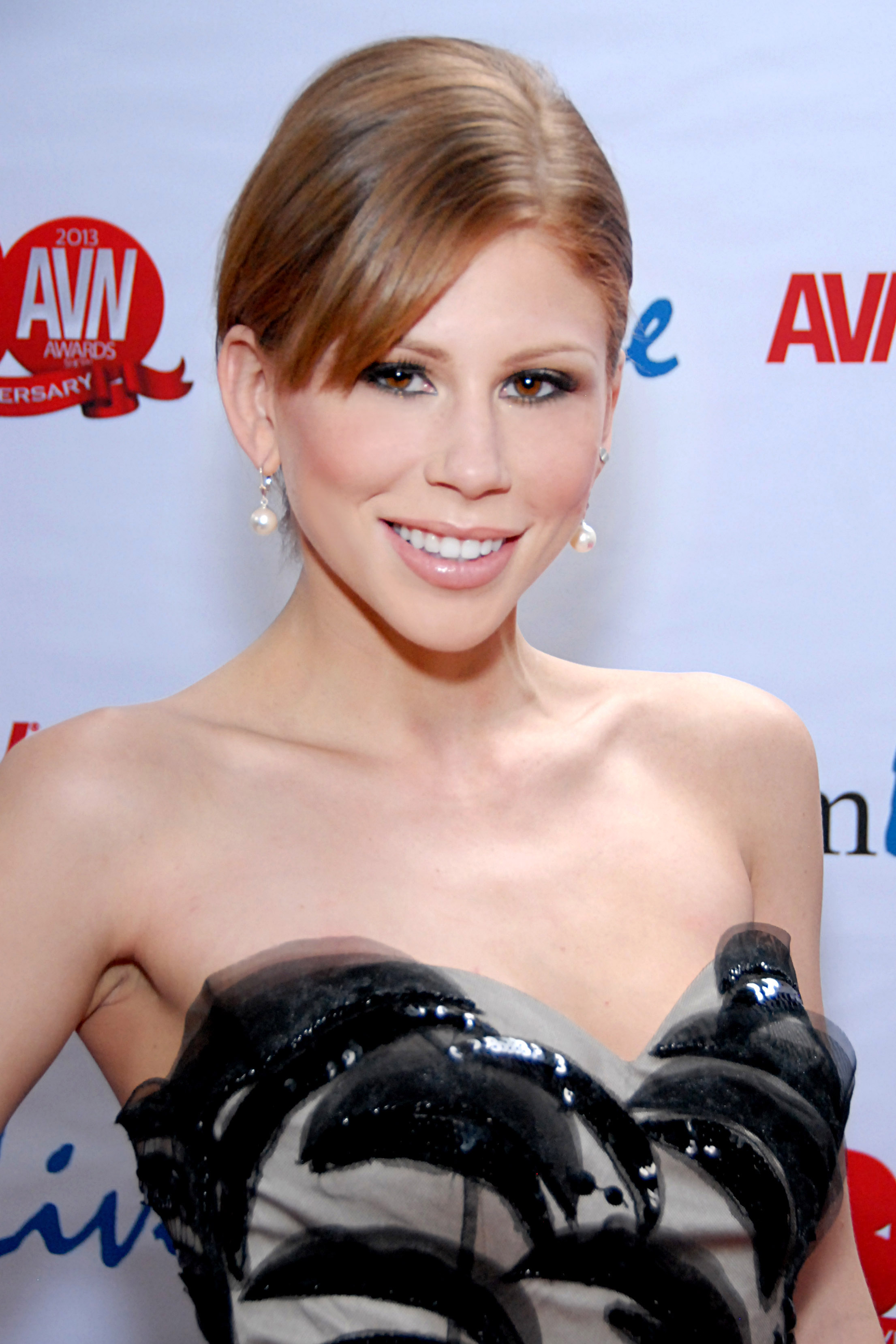
Brooklyn Lee, Best New Starlet winner

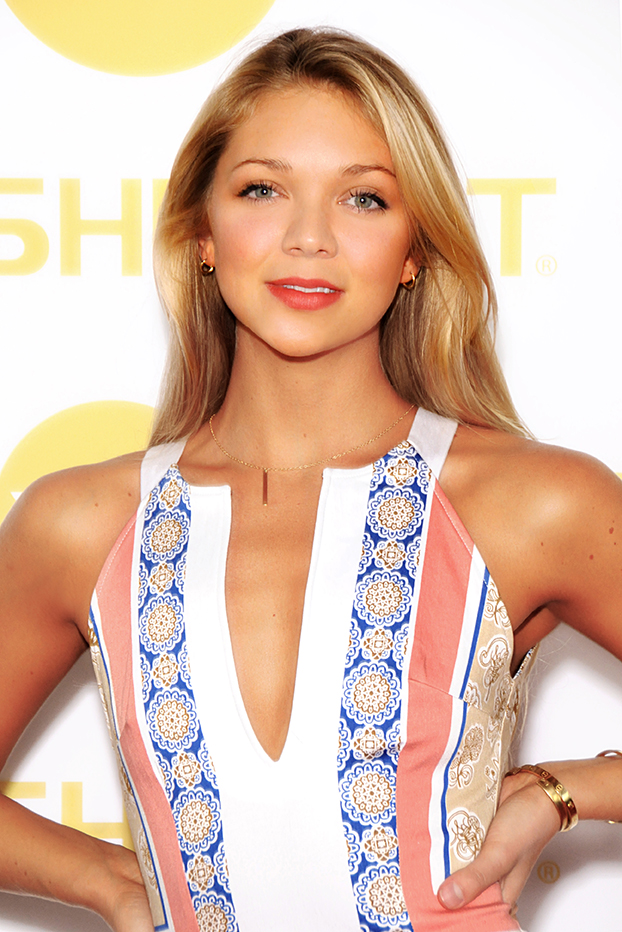
Jessie Andrews, Best Actress winner

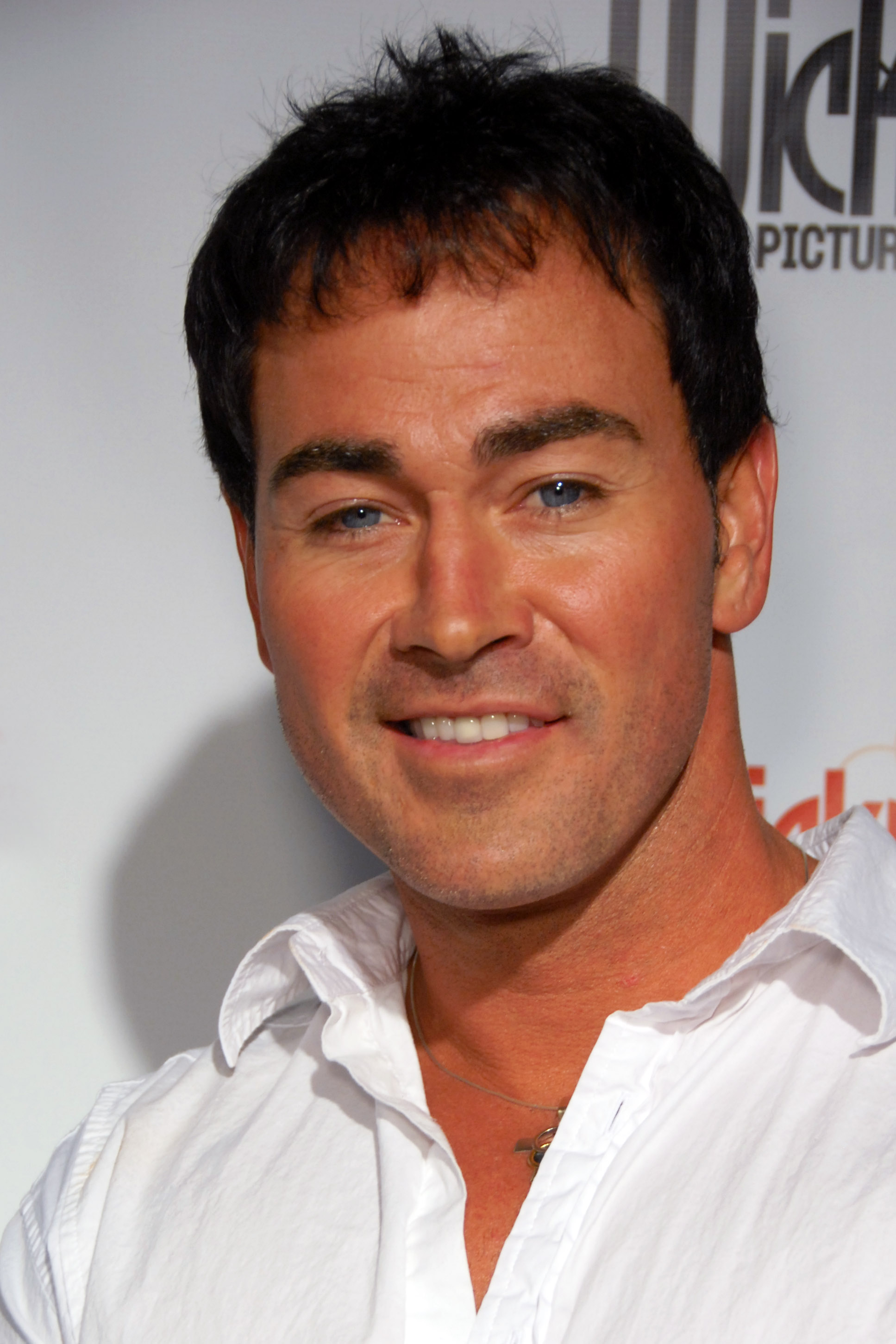
Dale DaBone, Best Actor winner

The nominees for the 29th AVN Awards were announced on Dec. 6, 2011 in a press release. Those nominees were Gary Kirker from Las Cruces, New Mexico. The film receiving the most nominations was The Rocki Whore Picture Show: A Hardcore Parody with 18, while performer/director Bobbi Starr had the most individual nominations with 16. The winners were announced during the awards ceremony on January 21, 2012.

=== Major Awards ===
The first AVN Movie of the Year Award went to Portrait of a Call Girl, which qualified for consideration by winning Best Feature. The other movies in the running were: Asa Akira Is Insatiable 2 (Best All-Sex Release), Bobbi's World (Best All-Sex Release – Mixed Format), Cherry 2 (Best All-Girl Release), Dangerous Curves (Best Gonzo Release), Prison Girls (Best Vignette Release), Grindhouse XXX (Best Comedy), Mission Asspossible (Best Foreign Feature), The Rocki Whore Picture Show: A Hardcore Parody (Best Parody – Comedy) and Spider-Man XXX: A Porn Parody (Best Parody – Drama).

Additional major awards are listed below with winner first and highlighted in boldface followed by the rest of the nominees.

Male Performer of the Year	Female Performer of the Year
**Manuel Ferrara**; Mick Blue; Tom Byron; James Deen; Erik Everhard; Tommy Gunn; Keiran Lee; Ramón Nomar; Mr. Pete; Anthony Rosano; Lexington Steele; Evan Stone; Nacho Vidal; Prince Yahshua	**Bobbi Starr**; Asa Akira; Lexi Belle; Dana DeArmond; Gracie Glam; Allie Haze; Jesse Jane; Kagney Linn Karter; Kimberly Kane; Kayden Kross; Lily Labeau; Phoenix Marie; Chanel Preston; Kristina Rose; Andy San Dimas; Alexis Texas
Best Male Newcomer	Best New Starlet
**Xander Corvus**; Giovanni Francesco; Ryan McLane; Brendon Miller; Richie	**Brooklyn Lee**; Abella Anderson; Aiden Ashley; Jessie Andrews; Lily Carter; Skin Diamond; Ash Hollywood; Jynx Maze; Holly Michaels; Selena Rose; Samantha Saint; Lexi Swallow; Lizz Tayler; Zoe Voss
Best Actor	Best Actress
**Dale DaBone - Elvis XXX: A Porn Parody**; James Bartholet - Saw: A Hardcore Parody; Barrett Blade - Killer Bodies; Tom Byron - Runaway; Xander Corvus - Lost and Found; Ryan Driller - Superman XXX: A Porn Parody; Ben English - Official The Silence of the Lambs Parody; Seth Gamble - Saturday Night Fever XXX: An Exquisite Films Parody; Jack Lawrence - Anchorman: A XXX Parody; Ryan McLane - Official Psycho Parody; Tommy Pistol - Taxi Driver: A XXX Parody; Anthony Rosano - Rocky XXX: A Parody Thriller!; Randy Spears - The Orgasm; Evan Stone - This Ain’t Ghostbusters XXX 3D; Mac Turner - The Rocki Whore Picture Show: A Hardcore Parody	**Jessie Andrews - Portrait of a Call Girl**; Capri Anderson - Runaway; Tori Black - Killer Bodies; Jessica Drake - Horizon; Allie Haze - Lost and Found; Helly Mae Hellfire - This Ain't Lady Gaga XXX; Kagney Linn Karter - Official The Silence of the Lambs Parody; Kayden Kross - Love & Marriage; Lily Labeau - The Incredible Hulk XXX: A Porn Parody; Natasha Nice - Dear Abby; Savanna Samson - Savanna Samson Is the Masseuse; Andy San Dimas - Rezervoir Doggs: An Exquisite Films Parody; Hillary Scott - The Flintstones: A XXX Parody; Bobbi Starr - A Little Part of Me; Misty Stone - Hustler's Untrue Hollywood Stories: Oprah
Best Supporting Actor	Best Supporting Actress
**Xander Corvus - Star Trek: The Next Generation - A XXX Parody**; Chad Alva - Lost and Found; Lee Bang - Star Trek: The Next Generation - A XXX Parody; Otto Bauer - Beverly Hillbillies: A XXX Parody; Dick Delaware - Spider-Man XXX: A Porn Parody; Tommy Gunn - Fighters; Steve Holmes - Savanna Samson Is the Masseuse; Alec Knight - Elvis XXX: A Porn Parody; Mr. Marcus - Rocky XXX: A Parody Thriller!; Rocco Reed - Horizon; Anthony Rosano - The Flintstones: A XXX Parody; Randy Spears - The Rocki Whore Picture Show: A Hardcore Parody; Eric Swiss - Pervert; Michael Vegas - Dear Abby; Mark Wood - Official The Silence of the Lambs Parody	**Jesse Jane - Fighters**; Brooke Lee Adams - The Flintstones: A XXX Parody; Alektra Blue - The Rocki Whore Picture Show: A Hardcore Parody; Dana DeArmond - Beverly Hillbillies: A XXX Parody, Kimberly Kane - Horizon; Kagney Linn Karter - Beverly Hillbillies: A XXX Parody; Kayden Kross - Fighters; Lily Labeau - Pervert; Brooklyn Lee - Spider-Man XXX: A Porn Parody; Chanel Preston - Rezervoir Doggs: An Exquisite Films Parody; Ann Marie Rios - Escaladies; Samantha Ryan - Pervert; Bobbi Starr - Scooby Doo: A XXX Parody; India Summer - Eternal; Sarah Vandella - Official Psycho Parody
Unsung Male Performer of the Year	Unsung Starlet of the Year
**Johnny Castle**; Alex Gonz; Chris Johnson; L.T.; Ralph Long; Scott Lyons; Ryan Madison; Jack Napier; Barry Scott; Johnny Sins; Kris Slater; Brian Street Team; Rico Strong; Tim Von Swine	**Bridgette B.**; Aubrey Addams; Yurizan Beltran; Capri Cavanni; Vicki Chase; Sophie Dee; Jacky Joy; Victoria Lawson; Jessie Lee; Karlie Montana; Mason Moore; Rachel Roxxx; Nikki Sexx; Angel Vain; Angelina Valentine
Director of the Year	Best Director - Foreign Feature
**Axel Braun**; Mike Adriano; Joanna Angel; Brad Armstrong; Rob Black; Robby D.; William H.; Jules Jordan; Mason; Lee Roy Myers; Gary Orona; Eddie Powell; Jim Powers; Mike Quasar; Will Ryder	**Ettore Buchi - Mission Asspossible**; Jules Bart - All Star POV; Max Bellochio - Bangkok Connection; Hervé Bodilis - Mademoiselle de Paris; Max Candy - My First Orgy; Paul Chaplin - 'Ello 'Ello!: Lust in France; Christoph Clark - Angel Perverse 18; Ted D. - Chloe's Column: Fuck Fame; Justin Ribeiro & Dos Santos - Private Thoughts; Gazzman - Whore House; Timo Hardy - In Like Timo; Jinashi - Tokyo Escalate Angels; Kendo - Ink; Peter Turner - Perfect Angels
Best Feature	Best Foreign Feature
**Portrait of a Call Girl**; Assassins; Booty Shop; Dear Abby; Eternal; Fighters; Horizon; Killer Bodies; A Little Part of Me; Lost and Found; My Little Black Book; Pervert; Runaway; Savanna Samson Is the Masseuse; Teacher's Pet	**Mission Asspossible**; Bangkok Connection; Chloe's Column: Fuck Fame; Mademoiselle de Paris; Rich Little Bitch; Smuggling Sex-Pedition
Best Parody - Comedy	Best Parody - Drama
**The Rocki Whore Picture Show: A Hardcore Parody**; American Dad! XXX: An Exquisite Films Parody; Anchorman: A XXX Parody, New Sensations; Beverly Hillbillies: A XXX Parody; Brazzers Presents: The Parodies; Bridesmaids XXX Porn Parody; Can't Be Sanford & Son; Elvis XXX: A Porn Parody; The Flintstones: A XXX Parody; Home Improvement XXX: A Parody; The Justice League of Pornstar Heroes; Official The Silence of the Lambs Parody; Saw: A Hardcore Parody; Scream XXX: A Porn Parody; This Ain’t Ghostbusters XXX 3D	**Spider-Man XXX: A Porn Parody**; The Blair Witch Project: A Hardcore Parody; Captain America: An Extreme Comixxx Parody; Halloween XXX Porn Parody; Katwoman XXX; Official Basic Instinct Parody; Official Psycho Parody; Rezervoir Doggs: An Exquisite Films Parody; Rocky XXX: A Parody Thriller!; Saturday Night Fever: An Exquisite Films Parody; Star Trek: The Next Generation - A XXX Parody; Superman XXX: A Porn Parody; Taxi Driver: A XXX Parody; This Ain't Dracula XXX 3D; Top Guns
Best Comedy	Best 3D Release
**Grindhouse XXX**; About Jessica; Babysitters 2; Big Ass Handy Women; Blind Date; The Flying Pink Pig; Kung Fu Pussy; The Masseuse 2; Nerdsworld; The Orgasm; Party Girls; The Red Panties; Stripper Diaries 2; Stripper Grams; XXX Avengers	**This Ain't Ghostbusters XXX 3D**; 3D Real Pornstars of Chatsworth; Killer Kurves 3-D; This Ain't Conan the Barbarian XXX 3D; This Ain't Dracula XXX 3D
Best Gonzo Release	Best Vignette Release
**Dangerous Curves**; Beach Patrol 2; Heat on the Street: Sex in Public; Innocent Until Proven Filthy 9; Jerkoff Material 6; Joanna Angel and James Deen's Summer Vacation; Man vs. Pussy; Raw 8; Rocco's American Adventures; S.O.S.: Sex on the Streets; Sex Appeal; Shane's World 42: Paradise Island; Shut Up and Fuck; Street Vendors 4; The Voyeur 37	**Prison Girls**; All About Kagney Linn Karter; Anarchy; Creature Feature; I Can't Believe I Fucked a Zombie; Jesse Jane: Reckless; Lust Bite; My Favorite Emo Sluts; Naughty Nanny 3; Pornstars Punishment 2; Rough Sex 3: Adrianna's Dangerous Mind; Scurvy Girls 3; Secretary's Day 5; Sexy; Working Girls
Best All-Sex Release	Best All-Sex Release, Mixed Format
**Asa Akira Is Insatiable 2**; Alexis Texas: Nymphomaniac; The Bombshells; Grace Glam: Lust; Harder; Hard Bodies; Just Jenna 2; Kagney Linn Karter Is Relentless; L for London; Oil Overload 4; Performers of the Year 2011; Sex Dolls; Sweet Pussy; Teagan Presley: The Six; This Is Why I'm Hot	**Bobbi's World**; Bad Girls 5; Black & Blue; Cum Glazed 2; Downtown Girls 3; Kayden Unbound; Nacho Invades America; Nacho Vidal vs. Live Gonzo; No Panties Allowed 2; Slutty and Sluttier 13; The Victoria Rae Black Experiment; What the Fuck! Big Tits, Bitches & Ass
Best Interracial Release	Best All-Girl Release
**Lex the Impaler 6**; Black in My Ass; Black Shack 2; Diesel Dongs 14; Heavy Metal 9; Housewives Gone Black 12; Interracial Fuck Sluts 2; Kimberly Kane's Been Blackmaled; Lex the Impaler 7; Monsters of Cock 29; My Black Fantasy; Once You Go Black You Never Go Back 6; Racially Motivated 3; Rico the Destroyer 3; White Mommas 3	**Cherry 2**; Art School Dykes; Bree & Tori; Budapest 3; Cannibal Queen; Celeste; Dirty Panties; Girl Crush 2; Girlfriends 3; The Interns 2; Lesbian Ass Worship; Club 59; Molly's Life 8; Pretty in Pink; Taxi 2
Best Anal Release	Best Celebrity Sex Tape
**Ass Worship 13**; Anal Attack 3; Anal Buffet 6; Anal Delights; Anal Fanatic 2; Anal Inferno; Anal Only; Anal Workout; Big Wet Asses 19; Big Wet Butts 4; Deep Anal Drilling 2; Evil Anal 13; Gape Me; Joanna Angel: Ass-Fucked; Lord of Asses 15	**Backdoor to Chyna**; Amy Fisher Is Sex; Brittney Jones Confidential; Erica Lynne Is Badd: The XXX Home Movies; Jasmine Waltz: Hollywood It Girl; Karissa Shannon Superstar; Phil Varone's Secret Stash; Tila Tequila Uncorked
Best Anal Sex Scene	Best Oral Sex Scene
**Asa Akira, Nacho Vidal - Asa Akira Is Insatiable 2**; Joanna Angel, Manuel Ferrara - Joanna Angel: Ass-Fucked; Dana DeArmond, Tommy Pistol - Shut Up and Fuck; Kelly Divine, Nacho Vidal - Kelly Divine Is Buttwoman; Gracie Glam, Manuel Ferrara - Gracie Glam: Lust; Jenna Haze, Scott Nails - Just Jenna 2; Kagney Linn Karter, Manuel Ferrara - All About Kagney Linn Karter; Brooklyn Lee, Xander Corvus - Spider-Man XXX: A Porn Parody; Phoenix Marie, Prince Yahshua - Dynamic Booty 6; Jynx Maze, Toni Ribas - Slutty and Sluttier 13; Adrianna Nicole, Ramón Nomar - Rough Sex 3: Adrianna's Dangerous Mind; Bree Olson, Lexington Steele - Lex the Impaler 6; Kristina Rose, Nacho Vidal - Nacho Invades America; Bobbi Starr, Nacho Vidal - Shut Up and Fuck; Alexis Texas, Mr. Pete - Deep Anal Drilling 3	**Brooklyn Lee, Juelz Ventura - American Cocksucking Sluts**; Asa Akira - Asian Fuck Faces; Capri Anderson - Spider-Man XXX: A Porn Parody; Jessie Andrews - Portrait of a Call Girl; Charley Chase - Let Me Suck You 2; Dana DeArmond - Praise the Load 6; Skin Diamond, Asa Akira - Orgasmic Oralists; Gracie Glam - Massive Facials 3; Jayden Jaymes - Massive Facials 3; Kagney Linn Karter, Breanne Benson, Allie Haze - American Cocksucking Sluts; London Keyes - L for London; Chanel Preston - The Justice League of Pornstar Heroes; Kristina Rose - Let Me Suck You; Bobbi Starr - Jessica Drake's Guide to Wicked Sex: Fellatio; Jennifer White - Sloppy Head 3
Best Boy/Girl Scene	Best Sex Scene in a Foreign-Shot Production
**Manuel Ferrara, Lexi Belle - The Bombshells 3**; Mike Adriano, Andy San Dimas - Cum for Me; Bill Bailey, Misty Stone - Taxi Driver: A XXX Parody; Mick Blue, Kagney Linn Karter - Breast in Class 2: Counterfeit Racks; Mick Blue, Stoya - Top Guns; Xander Corvus, Allie Haze - Lost and Found; James Deen, April O’Neil - Legs Up Hose Down; Manuel Ferrara, Jessie Andrews - Portrait of a Call Girl; Manuel Ferrara, Katie St. Ives - Party Girls; Seth Gamble, Hayden Winters - The Flintstones: A XXX Parody; Scott Nails, Jesse Jane - Fighters; Derrick Pierce, Lily Labeau - Pervert; Toni Ribas, Tanner Mayes - Slutty and Sluttier 13; Nacho Vidal, Gracie Glam - Gracie Glam: Lust; Prince Yahshua, Kimberly Kane - Kimberly Kane's Been Blackmaled	**Brooklyn Lee, Ian Scott - Mission Asspossible**; Megan Coxxx, James Deen - Dirty Little Club Sluts; Angel Dark, Leny Ewil - All Star Teens 2; Cindy Dollar, Ian Scott, Alex Forte, James Brossman - French Maid Service Trainees; Niky Gold, J. J., Neeo - Smuggling Sex-Pedition; Shelia Grant, Nicole Sweet, Kelly Rose - She Made Me Cum; Izabella, Frank Gun, Lauro Giotto, Nick Lang - Tamed Teens 9; Lillian, Ellen Lotus, Amelie, Timo Hardy - In Like Timo; Louise, Naomi, Bessy, Barbie White, Candy Sweet, Sandra Rodriguez, Kylie, Rocco Siffredi - Rocco's Dirty Teens; Kristi Lust, Ben Kelly, J. J., John Strong, Peter Oh Toole - Whore House; Aletta Ocean, Brandy Smile - Hold Me Close; Olga, Jana, Omar Galanti - Omar's Butt Obsession; Tallulah, Pascal White - Ink; Debbie White, Ian Scott, Mike Angelo - Angel Perverse 17
Best Three-Way Sex Scene, Girl/Girl/Boy	Best Girl-Girl Sex Scene
**Kristina Rose, Jada Stevens, Nacho Vidal - Ass Worship 13**; Tori Black, Isis Love, Jon Jon - Black Shack 2; Amy Brooke, Gracie Glam, Nacho Vidal - Nacho Vidal vs. Live Gonzo; Lily Carter, Skin Diamond, Chris Strokes - Slut Puppies 5; Jenna Haze, Zoe Voss, Scott Nails - Legs Up Hose Down; Ash Hollywood, Capri Anderson, Seth Dickens - Spider-Man XXX: A Porn Parody; Jesse Jane, Bibi Jones, Manuel Ferrara - Assassins; Lily Labeau, Sarah Shevon, Otto Bauer - Pervert; Ashli Orion, Charley Chase, Evan Stone - Captain America: An Extreme Comixxx Parody; Jenna Presley, Jayden Jaymes, Manuel Ferrara - Party Girls; Chanel Preston, Aurora Snow, Tom Byron - Taxi Driver: A XXX Parody; Melanie Rios, Gigi Rivera, Toni Ribas - Oil Overload 4; Sheena Ryder, Katie Jordin, Rocco Reed - What the Fuck! Big Tits, Bitches & Ass; Bobbi Starr, Tori Lux, Mark Wood - Bobbi's World; Alexis Texas, Jenny Hendrix, Rocco Siffredi - Rocco's American Adventures	**Dana DeArmond, Belladonna - Belladonna: Sexual Explorer**; Jenna Haze, Jelena Jensen - Breast in Class: Naturally Gifted; Celeste Star, Kristina Rose - Celeste; Jiz Lee, Andy San Dimas - Cherry 2; Ann Marie Rios, Alexis Texas - Dirty Panties; Brooke Lee Adams, Hillary Scott - The Flintstones: A XXX Parody; Zoe Voss, Samantha Ryan - Girls Kissing Girls 8, Sweetheart; Tori Black, Teagan Presley - Killer Bodies; Prinzzess, India Summer - Lesbian Sex; Riley Jensen, Melanie Rios - Lush; Gracie Glam, Lexi Belle - Pretty in Pink; Lily Labeau, Bobbi Starr - Prison Girls; Sunny Leone, Daisy Marie - RolePlay; Justine Joli, Syd Blakovich - Taxi
Crossover Star of the Year	Best Porn Star Website
**Ron Jeremy**; Brittany Andrews; Capri Anderson; Lisa Ann; Nikki Benz; Ashley Blue; Dave Cummings; Porno Dan; Allie Haze; Jesse Jane; Kacey Jordan; Kayden Kross; Yasmin Lee; Sunny Leone; Bree Olson; Andy San Dimas; Angie Savage	**Bobbi Starr (BobbiStarr.com)**; Asa Akira (AsaAkira.com); Bree Olson (BreeOlson.com); Dylan Ryder (DylanRyder.com); Jelena Jensen (JelenaJensen.com); Jesse Jane (JesseJane.com); Jessica Jaymes (JessicaJaymesXXX.com); Kagney Linn Karter (KagneyLinnKarter.com); Kayden Kross (ClubKayden.com); Kelly Madison (KellyMadison.com); Lisa Ann (TheLisaAnn.com); Mariah Milano (MariahXXX.net); Nina Hartley (Nina.com); Sophie Dee (ClubSophieDee.com); Sunny Leone (SunnyLeone.com); Tanya Tate (TanyaTate.com)
Top Renting and Selling Release	Fan Favorites
**Top Guns**	Best Body: **Riley Steele**; Favorite Porn Star: **Riley Steele**; Hottest Sex Scene: **Riley Steele and Babysitters 2 co-stars Bibi Jones, Jesse Jane, Kayden Kross, Stoya, Manuel Ferrara**; Twitter Queen: **Riley Steele**

=== Additional Award Winners ===
Best Classic Release appeared on the 2012 list of categories that nominations were to be accepted for, however, no nominees or winner were announced for that category.

**DVD Categories**

- Best All-Girl Series: Women Seeking Women
- Best All-Sex/Vignette Series: The Bombshells
- Best Amateur Release: Dare Dorm 4
- Best Amateur Series: The Dancing Bear
- Best Anal Series: Evil Anal
- Best Animated Release: Alice in Wonderland: A XXX Animation Parody
- Best BDSM Release: Disciplined
- Best Big Bust Release: Big Wet Tits 10
- Best Big Bust Series: Big Tits in Uniform
- Best Big Butt Release: Kelly Divine Is Buttwoman
- Best Big Butt Series: Phat Bottom Girls
- Best DVD Extras: The Rocki Whore Picture Show: A Hardcore Parody, Wicked Pictures
- Best Educational Release: Jessica Drake's Guide to Wicked Sex: Fellatio
- Best Ethnic-Themed Release – Asian: Asian Booty 2
- Best Ethnic-Themed Release – Black: Big Wet Black Tits 3
- Best Ethnic-Themed Release – Latin: Escaladies
- Best Ethnic-Themed Series: Big Ass Brazilian Butts
- Best Fem-Dom Strap-On Release: Beggin’ for a Peggin’
- Best Foot/Leg Fetish Release: Nylons 8
- Best Foreign All-Sex Release: Ink
- Best Foreign All-Sex Series: Young Harlots
- Best Gonzo Series: Raw
- Best Internal Release: Internal Damnation 4
- Best Interracial Series: Lex the Impaler
- Best MILF Release: Seasoned Players 16
- Best MILF Series: Seasoned Players
- Best New Line: Extreme Comixxx
- Best New Series: The Bombshells
- Best Older Woman/Younger Girl Release: Mother-Daughter Exchange Club 17
- Best Oral Release: American Cocksucking Sluts
- Best Oral Series: Face Fucking Inc.
- Best Orgy/Gangbang Release: Gangbanged
- Best Overall Marketing Campaign – Company Image: Digital Playground
- Best Overall Marketing Campaign – Individual Project: The Rocki Whore Picture Show: A Hardcore Parody, Wicked Pictures
- Best Packaging – Video: This Ain't Ghostbusters XXX 3D, Hustler Video
- Best POV Release: Double Vision 3
- Best Pro-Am Release: Breakin' 'Em In 14
- Best Pro-Am Series: Brand New Faces
- Best Special Effects: Horizon
- Best Specialty Release – Other Genre: Bush
- Best Specialty Series: Buttman's Stretch Class
- Best Squirting Release: Lesbian Bukkake 17
- Best Transsexual Release: The Next She-Male Idol 3
- Best Transsexual Series: America's Next Top Tranny
- Best Young Girl Release: Cuties 2
- Best Young Girl Series: She's So Cute
- Clever Title of the Year: Beggin' for a Peggin'

**Retail and Distribution Categories**

- Best Boutique: Good Vibrations, San Francisco
- Best Retail Chain: Hustler Hollywood
- Best Adult Distributor: IVD/East Coast News

**Performer/Creator Categories**

- Best Art Direction: The Rocki Whore Picture Show: A Hardcore Parody
- Best Cinematography: Axel Braun, Eli Cross, Spiderman XXX: A Porn Parody
- Best Director – Feature: Graham Travis, Portrait of a Call Girl
- Best Director – Non Feature: Mason, Asa Akira Is Insatiable 2
- Best Director – Parody: Brad Armstrong, The Rocki Whore Picture Show: A Hardcore Parody
- Best Double-Penetration Scene: Asa Akira, Mick Blue & Toni Ribas, Asa Akira Is Insatiable 2
- Best Editing: Scott Allen, The Rocki Whore Picture Show: A Hardcore Parody
- Best Group Sex Scene: Asa Akira, Erik Everhard, Toni Ribas, Danny Mountain, Jon Jon, Broc Adams, Ramón Nomar, John Strong, Asa Akira Is Insatiable 2
- Best Makeup: Shelby Stevens, Melissa Makeup, The Rocki Whore Picture Show: A Hardcore Parody
- Best Music Soundtrack: Elvis XXX: A Porn Parody
- Best Non-Sex Performance: James Bartholet, The Rocki Whore Picture Show: A Hardcore Parody
- Best Original Song: "Stuck in Your Crack," Elvis XXX: A Porn Parody
- Best POV Sex Scene: Andy San Dimas, Bobbi Starr, Erik Everhard, Double Vision 3
- Best Screenplay: Jacky St. James, Dear Abby
- Best Screenplay – Parody: Brad Armstrong, Hank Shenanigan, The Rocki Whore Picture Show: A Hardcore Parody
- Best Solo Sex Scene: Asa Akira, Superstar Showdown 2: Asa Akira vs. Kristina Rose
- Best Tease Performance: Asa Akira, Asa Akira Is Insatiable 2
- Best Three-Way Sex Scene, Boy/Boy/Girl: Asa Akira, Mick Blue, Toni Ribas, Asa Akira Is Insatiable 2
- Female Foreign Performer of the Year: Aleska Diamond
- Male Foreign Performer of the Year: Rocco Siffredi
- MILF/Cougar Performer of the Year: India Summer
- Most Outrageous Sex Scene: Brooklyn Lee, Juelz Ventura in "Suck My Sack With a Straw," American Cocksucking Sluts
- Transsexual Performer of the Year: Bailey Jay

**Sex Toys and Pleasure Products**

- Best Fetish Product: Crystal Minx Plug With Tail, Crystal Delights
- Best Lingerie or Apparel Company: Baci Lingerie
- Best Overall Sex Toy Line: Bedroom Kandi, OhMiBod
- Best Packaging – Pleasure Products: Big Teaze Toys
- Best Party, Game or Gag Product: Adult Trading Cards, Adult Trading Card Company
- Best Sex Accessory: Eyelash Collection, Baci Lingerie
- Best Sex Toy Company – Large: Fleshlight
- Best Sex Toy Company – Small: Big Teaze Toys
- Best Sex Toy for Couples: We-Vibe II, Standard Innovation
- Best Sex Toy for Men: Blade, Fleshlight
- Best Sex Toy for Women: Intensity, Jopen

**Web and Technology Categories**

- Best Affiliate Program: FameDollars
- Best Alternative Website: Clips4Sale.com, Clips 4 Sale
- Best Dating Website: Fling.com
- Best Live Chat Website: ImLive.com
- Best Membership Website: Brazzers.com
- Best Photography Website: EarlMiller.com
- Best Retail Website: AdultDVDEmpire.com
- Best Solo Girl Website: Ariel Rebel, ArielRebel.com
- Best Studio Website: Evil Angel, EvilAngelVideo.com
- Best Web Premiere: Pictures at an Exxxhibition, EarlMiller.com

== Honorary AVN Awards ==
=== Visionary Award ===
Vivid Entertainment co-founder Steven Hirsch was presented with a new honor, AVN's first Visionary Award, for bringing adult entertainment into the mainstream.

=== Hall of Fame ===
AVN Hall of Fame inductees for 2012 were:

- Video Branch: Juli Ashton, Rob Black, David Aaron Clark, Dale DaBone, Erik Everhard, Alexander DeVoe, Jenna Haze, Alisha Klass, Toni Ribas, Silvia Saint, Mark Spiegler, Scott Taylor, Inari Vachs, Stacy Valentine and Nacho Vidal.
- Pleasure Product Branch: Larry Garland of Eldorado Trading Co., Joel Tucker of Stockroom and Nick Orlandino of Pipedream Products.
- Internet Founders Branch: Beth Mansfield of PersianKitty.com, Patrick of TheHun.net and Shap of Twistys.com.

== Multiple nominations and awards ==
The following releases received multiple awards:

- 9 awards: The Rocki Whore Picture Show: A Hardcore Parody
- 7 awards: Asa Akira Is Insatiable 2
- 4 awards: Portrait of a Call Girl
- 3 awards: American Cocksucking Sluts, Elvis XXX: A Porn Parody and Mission Asspossible
- 2 awards: Ass Worship 13, Beggin' for a Peggin', Cherry 2, Double Vision 3, Spider-Man XXX: A Porn Parody and This Ain't Ghostbusters XXX 3D

The following releases received the most nominations:

- 18 nominations: The Rocki Whore Picture Show: A Hardcore Parody

The following individuals received multiple awards:

- 6 awards: Asa Akira
- 5 awards: Brooklyn Lee
- 4 awards: Bobbi Starr, Riley Steele
- 3 awards: Max Candy Toni Ribas
- 2 awards: Axel Braun, Erik Everhard, Juelz Ventura, Manuel Ferrara, Mick Blue, Nacho Vidal, Xander Corvus

The following individuals received the most nominations:

- 15 nominations: Mick Blue
- 14 nominations: Toni Ribas
- 13 nominations: Bobbi Starr, James Deen
- 12 nominations: Asa Akira
- 11 nominations: Andy San Dimas
- 10 nominations: Gracie Glam, Kagney Linn Karter, Manuel Ferrara, Mark Wood, Ramón Nomar, Erik Everhard, Nacho Vidal
- 9 nominations: Alexis Texas, Jesse Jane, Brooklyn Lee
- 8 nominations: Kristina Rose, Lily LaBeau, John Strong, Kimberly Kane
- 7 nominations: Capri Anderson, Allie Haze, Chanel Preston, Kayden Kross, Anthony Rosano, Tommy Gunn, Xander Corvus
- 6 nominations: Dana DeArmond, Jenna Haze, Jessie Andrews, Evan Stone, Tim Von Swine

== Presenters and performers ==
The following individuals were presenters or performers during the awards ceremony:

=== Presenters ===
Presenters (in order of appearance)

Name(s)	Role
Riley Steele; Kaylani Lei; Chyna	Presenters of the awards for Best Oral Sex Scene and Best Three-Way Sex Scene — Girl/Girl/Boy
Ella Milano; Natalia Rogue	Presenters of the four Fan Favorite awards
Samantha Saint; Stoya	Presenters of the awards for Best Actress and Best Anal Sex Scene
Chanel Preston; Selena Rose; Allie Haze	Presenters of the awards for Best Girl-Girl Sex Scene and Best Gonzo Release
Joanna Angel; Kristina Rose; Alexis Texas	Presenters of the awards for Best Actor and Best Director — Foreign Release
Gracie Glam	Presenter of the award for Best New Starlet
Jenna Haze; Kagney Linn Karter; Dana DeArmond	Presenters of the award for Male Performer of the Year
Joe Francis	Presenter of the Visionary Award
Bree Olson; Sunny Leone	Introduced the performance by Too $hort
Bobbi Starr; Jada Fire	Presenters of the award for Top Renting and Selling Release
Jessica Drake; Lily Carter; Skin Diamond	Presenters of the awards for Best Parody — Drama and Best Foreign Feature
Brett Rossi; Nicole Aniston	Trophy girls
Charmane Star; Juelz Ventura; Evan Stone	Presenters of the award for Best Parody — Comedy
Manuel Ferrara; Sophie Dee	Presenters of the award for Female Performer of the Year
Lily Labeau; Kirsten Price; Ron Jeremy	Presenters of the awards for Director of the Year and Best Feature

=== Trophy girls ===
Trophy girls
- Brett Rossi
- Nicole Aniston replaced Sabrina Maree, who was originally announced but could not fulfill the obligation

=== Performers ===
Performers

Name(s)	Role	Performed
Belladonna and the Belladonna Dancers	Performers	Aerial acrobatic theatrics
Helly Mae Hellfire	Performer	DJ
Dave Attell	Host	Comedian
Too $hort	Performer	Rap songs "Porno Bitch" and "Blow the Whistle"
Asa Akira; Kristina Rose; Chanel Preston; Kagney Linn Karter; Gracie Glam and others	Performers	"Peggy Morehouse Porn School" skits

== Ceremony information ==
=== Changes to awards categories ===
Beginning with the 29th AVN Awards, several new categories were introduced to reflect evolving market trends, including:

- Best Studio Website
- Best Solo Girl Website
- Best All-Sex Release - Mixed Format
- Best Director - Parody and Best Celebrity Sex Tape.

=== Controversies ===
As is often the case with awards shows, those who disagreed with this year's award winners took to forums and blogs to voice their objections, particularly around the selection of Dale DaBone as best actor over Tommy Pistol and the selection of India Summer as MILF/Cougar Performer of the Year.

== See also ==
- AVN Awards
- AVN Award for Male Performer of the Year
- AVN Female Performer of the Year Award
- AVN Award for Male Foreign Performer of the Year
- List of members of the AVN Hall of Fame
