= AVN Award for Male Foreign Performer of the Year =

Pornographic film award presented annually by AVN

- AVN award for contributions of foreign male performers to pornography
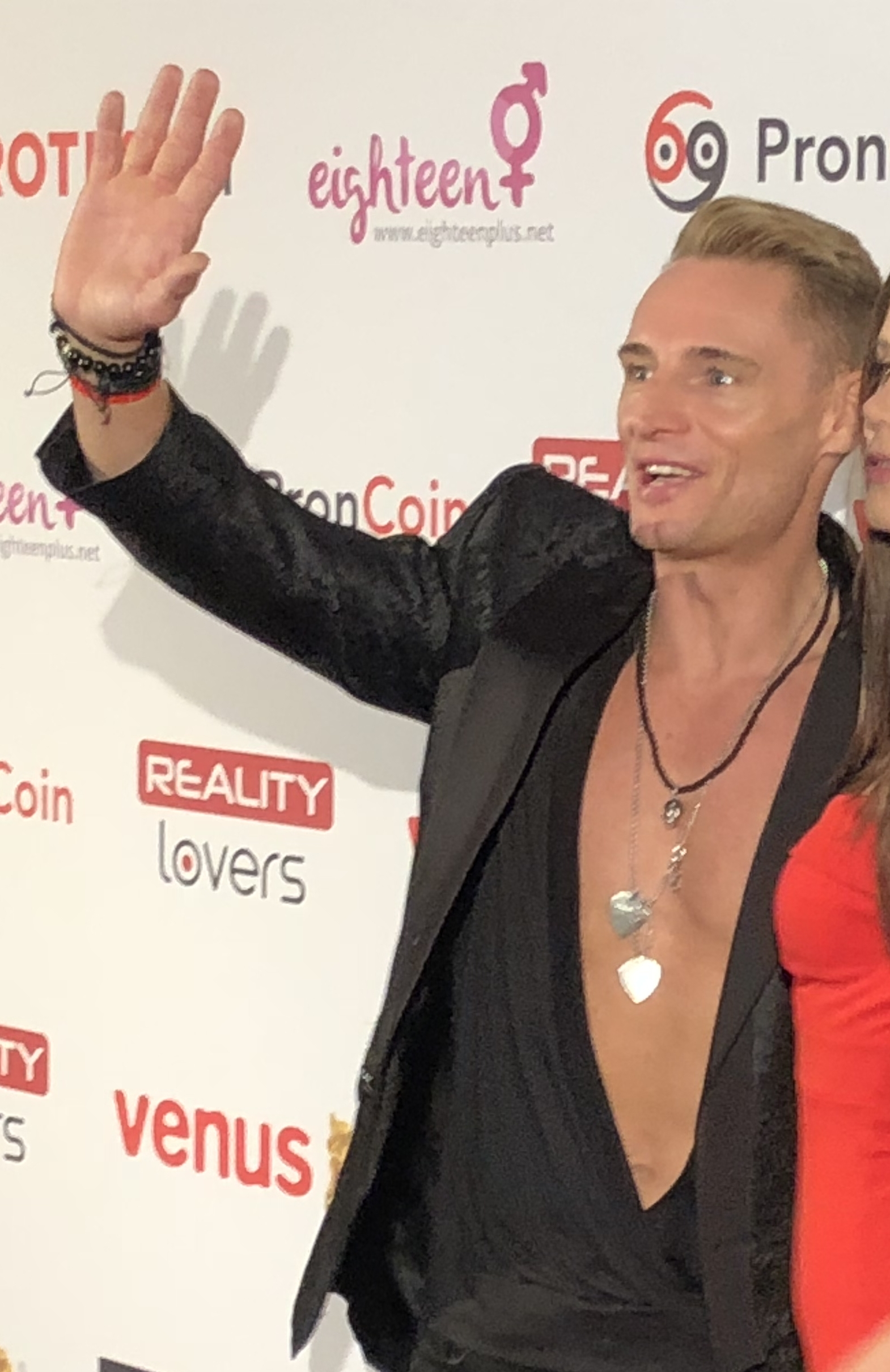
- The 2026 recipient: Marcello Bravo
- Awarded for: Best Performance by a Foreign Male Performer
- Sponsored by: AVN
- Location: Las Vegas
- Country: USA
- Presented by: AVN Media Network
- First award: 2003; 23 years ago
- Final award: 2026
- Most recent winner: Marcello Bravo; Austria

Highlights
- Most wins: (Italy) Rocco Siffredi (10 awards)
- Most nominations: (Spain) Nacho Vidal and (France) David Perry (12 nominations)
- Total awarded: 24
- First winner: Rocco Siffredi; Italy
- Website: avnawards.avn.com

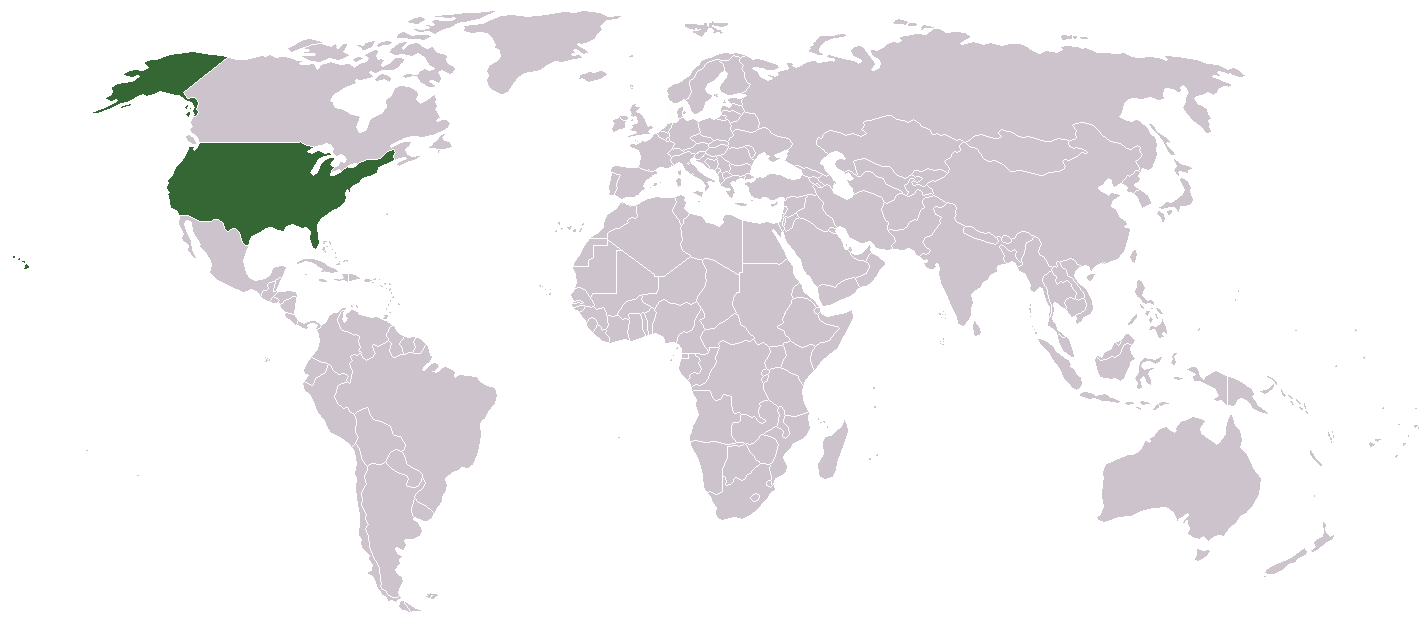
USA (ineligible for competition)

The AVN Award for Male Foreign Performer of the Year is an award that has been given annually by the sex industry company AVN since the award's inception in 2003.

The first recipient of the award was Italian-born pornographic actor Rocco Siffredi who was awarded at the 20th AVN Awards in 2003. As of 2026, twelve pornographic actors have been awarded who are of five different nationalities: Italian (eleven), British and French (four), German and Spanish (two), Austrian (one).

Italian pornographic actor Rocco Siffredi is the most honoured actor with ten awards followed by British pornographic actor Danny D with three awards and German pornographic actor Steve Holmes with two awards. Rocco Siffredi is the oldest recipient of the award at the age of 56 in 2021 and Danny D is the youngest recipient of the award at the age of 29 in 2017. Italian pornographic actor Rocco Siffredi is the only performer to have won in three different decades—the 2000s, 2010s, and 2020s. The most recent winner of the award is Austrian pornographic actor Marcello Bravo, who was awarded at the 43rd AVN Awards in 2026.

== Overview ==
Performer country of origin	Title(s)	No. of performer(s)
Italy	11	2
United Kingdom	4	2
France	4	4
Germany	2	1
Spain	2	2
Austria	1	1

== Winners and nominees ==
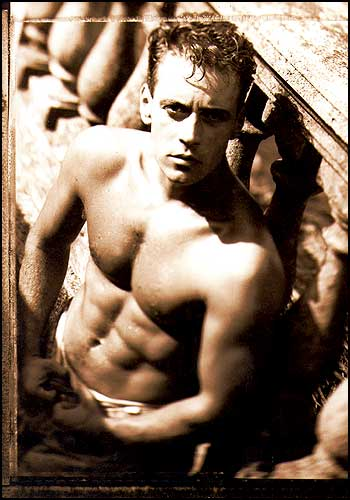
Rocco Siffredi has been the most frequent winner of the award (ten times).

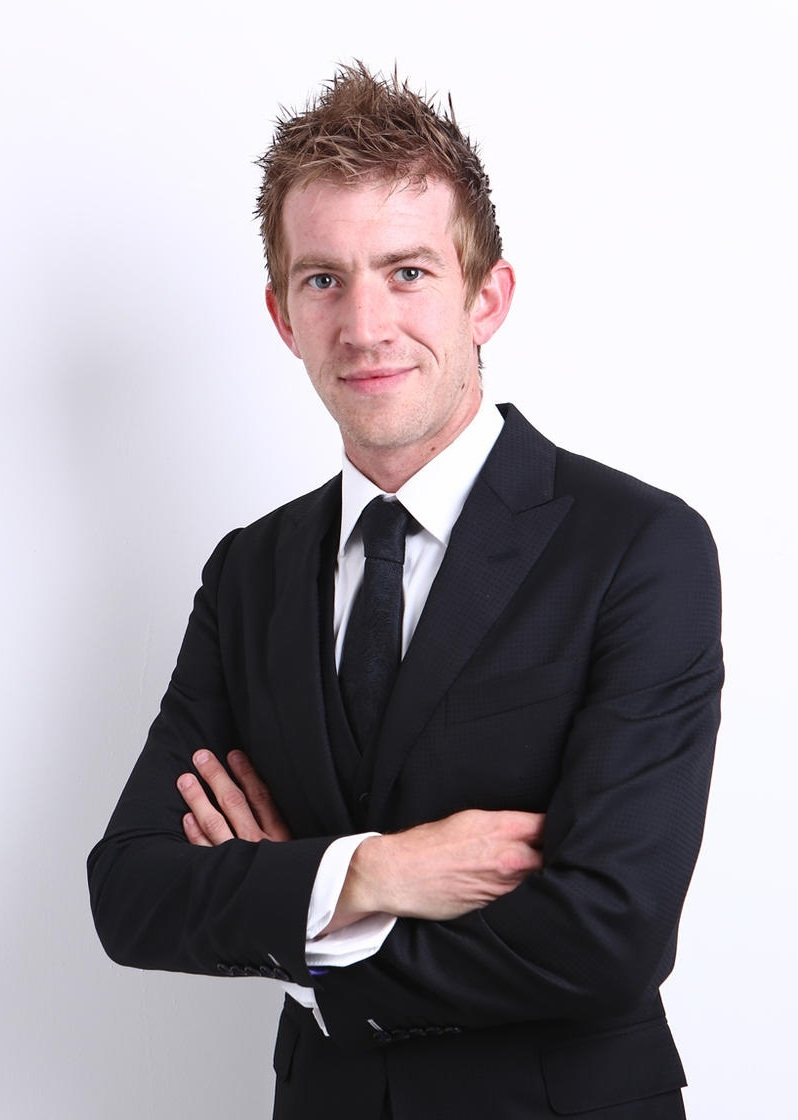
Danny D has won the award three times.

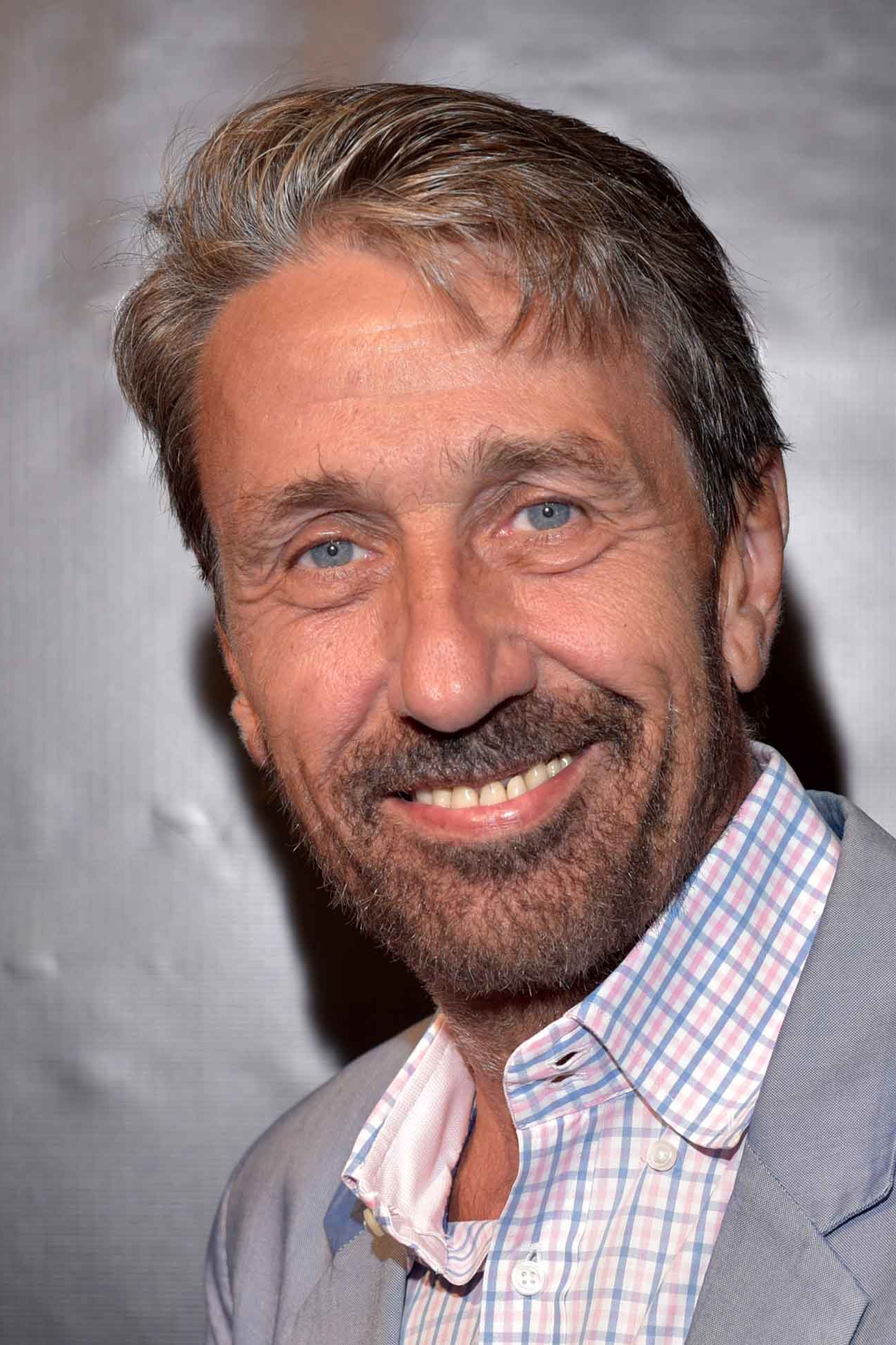
Steve Holmes has won the award two times.

=== 2000s ===
Year	Photo	Winner	Nationality	Nominees	Ref(s)
2003 (20th)		Rocco Siffredi	(Italy) Italian	(France) Christoph Clark; (Germany) Steve Holmes; (Netherlands) Alberto Rey; (Spain) Toni Ribas; (Spain) Nacho Vidal	
2004 (21st)		Manuel Ferrara	(France) French	(Hungary) Frank Gun; (Germany) Steve Holmes; (Italy) Denis Marti; (Spain) Toni Ribas; (Venezuela) Franco Roccaforte; (Italy) Rocco Siffredi; (Spain) Nacho Vidal	
2005 (22nd)		Steve Holmes	(Germany) German	(Austria) Mick Blue; (Germany) Chris Charming; (Italy) Denis Marti; (France) David Perry; (Spain) Toni Ribas; (Venezuela) Franco Roccaforte; (France) Tristan Seagal; (Italy) Rocco Siffredi; (Spain) Nacho Vidal	
2006 (23rd)		Steve Holmes	(Germany) German	(Uruguay) Marco Banderas; (Austria) Mick Blue; Dillon; (Hungary) Frank Gun; (Brazil) Kid Jamaica; (Italy) Denis Marti; (France) David Perry; (Spain) Toni Ribas; (Italy) Rocco Siffredi	
2007 (24th)		Jean Val Jean	(France) French	(Austria) Mick Blue; (France) Greg Centauro; (Italy) Tony DeSergio; (Republic of Ireland) Jazz Duro; (Italy) Omar Galanti; (Germany) Steve Holmes; (Italy) Denis Marti; (France) David Perry; (Morocco) Zenza Raggi; (Venezuela) Franco Roccaforte; (Spain) Toni Ribas; (Italy) Rocco Siffredi; (Czech Republic) George Uhl; (Spain) Nacho Vidal	
2008 (25th)		David Perry	(France) French	(Austria) Mick Blue; (Hungary) James Brossman; (France) Greg Centauro; (Republic of Ireland) Jazz Duro; (Italy) Omar Galanti; (Germany) Steve Holmes; (Brazil) Kid Jamaica; (France) Joachim Kessef; (Hungary) Frank Major; (Morocco) Zenza Raggi; (Spain) Toni Ribas; (Venezuela) Franco Roccaforte; (France) Ian Scott; (Spain) Nacho Vidal	
2009 (26th)		Rocco Siffredi	(Italy) Italian	(France) Mike Angelo; (Hungary) James Brossman; (Republic of Ireland) Jazz Duro; (Italy) Omar Galanti; (Hungary) Lauro Giotto; (Hungary) Frank Gun; (Germany) Steve Holmes; (Hungary) Nick Lang; (United Kingdom) Keiran Lee; (France) David Perry; (Morocco) Zenza Raggi; (Spain) Toni Ribas; (Spain) Oliver Sanchez; (Czech Republic) George Uhl	

=== 2010s ===
Year	Photo	Winner	Nationality	Nominees	Ref(s)
2010 (27th)		Toni Ribas	(Spain) Spanish	(Hungary) James Brossman; (Italy) Christian Devil; (Germany) Steve Holmes; (France) Mike Angelo; (Republic of Ireland) Jazz Duro; (Italy) Omar Galanti; (Hungary) Choky Ice; (France) JPX; (France) David Perry; (Morocco) Zenza Raggi; (Spain) Oliver Sanchez; (Italy) Rocco Siffredi; (Czech Republic) George Uhl; (Spain) Nacho Vidal	
2011 (28th)		Rocco Siffredi	(Italy) Italian	(France) Mike Angelo; (Hungary) James Brossman; (United Kingdom) Demetri XXX; (Italy) Christian Devil; (Republic of Ireland) Jazz Duro; (Italy) Omar Galanti; (Hungary) Frank Gun; (Hungary) Choky Ice; (Brazil) Kid Jamaica; (Hungary) Frank Major; (Romania) Mugur; (Spain) Toni Ribas; (Spain) Oliver Sanchez; (France) Ian Scott	
2012 (29th)		Rocco Siffredi	(Italy) Italian	(Hungary) James Brossman; (United Kingdom) Danny D; (Italy) Cristian Devil; (Italy) Omar Galanti; (Russia) Timo Hardy; (Hungary) Choky Ice; (Hungary) Nick Lang; (France) David Perry; (France) Tristan Segal; (Czech Republic) George Uhl; (Belgium) Pascal White	
2013 (30th)		Rocco Siffredi	(Italy) Italian	(France) Mike Angelo; (Hungary) James Brossman; (United Kingdom) Danny D; (Italy) Cristian Devil; (Czech Republic) Leny Ewil; (Italy) Omar Galanti; (Russia) Timo Hardy; (Hungary) Choky Ice; (Romania) Mugur; (France) David Perry; (France) Ian Scott; (United Kingdom) Kai Taylor; (Czech Republic) George Uhl; (Belgium) Pascal White	
2014 (31st)		Rocco Siffredi	(Italy) Italian	(France) Mike Angelo; (Hungary) James Brossman; (United Kingdom) Danny D; (Italy) Omar Galanti; (Hungary) Lauro Giotto; (Hungary) Choky Ice; (Brazil) Kid Jamaica; (Hungary) Nick Lang; (Romania) Mugur; (Czech Republic) Neeo; (France) David Perry; (France) Ian Scott; (Czech Republic) George Uhl; (Spain) Nacho Vidal	
2015 (32nd)		Rocco Siffredi	(Italy) Italian	(France) Mike Angelo; (Hungary) James Brossman; (United Kingdom) Danny D; (Italy) Omar Galanti; (Hungary) Lauro Giotto; (Hungary) Choky Ice; (Czech Republic) Neeo; (France) David Perry; (France) Ian Scott; (Hungary) Renato; (United Kingdom) Ryan Ryder; (Hungary) Thomas Stone; (Czech Republic) George Uhl; (Spain) Nacho Vidal	
2016 (33rd)		Rocco Siffredi	(Italy) Italian	(France) Mike Angelo; (Hungary) James Brossman; (Italy) Christian Clay; (United Kingdom) Danny D; (Hungary) Choky Ice; (Romania) Mugur; (Czech Republic) Neeo; (France) David Perry; (Hungary) Renato; (United Kingdom) Ryan Ryder; (Czech Republic) George Uhl; (United Kingdom) Marc Rose; (France) Ian Scott; (Spain) Nacho Vidal	
2017 (34th)		Danny D	(United Kingdom) British	(France) Mike Angelo; (Italy) Christian Clay; (Spain) Chris Diamond; (Spain) Pablo Ferrari; (France) Joss Lescaf; (Romania) Mugur; (Czech Republic) Neeo; (United Kingdom) Marc Rose; (United Kingdom) Ryan Ryder; (Hungary) Sabby; (France) Yanick Shaft; (Italy) Rocco Siffredi; (Czech Republic) George Uhl; (Spain) Nacho Vidal	
2018 (35th)		Ryan Ryder	(United Kingdom) British	(France) Emilio Ardana; (France) Alberto Blanco; (Czech Republic) Kristof Cale; (United Kingdom) Danny D; (Spain) Chris Diamond; (Spain) Pablo Ferrari; (United Kingdom) Luke Hardy; (Spain) Juan Lucho; (Hungary) Renato; (United Kingdom) Marc Rose; (Italy) Rocco Siffredi; (Czech Republic) George Uhl; (Spain) Nacho Vidal; (Belgium) Pascal White	
2019 (36th)		Rocco Siffredi	(Italy) Italian	(France) Mike Angelo; (Spain) Alberto Blanco; (Czech Republic) Kristof Cale; (Italy) Christian Clay; (Czech Republic) Charlie Dean; (France) Dorian del Isla; (Canada) Erik Everhard; (France) Anthony Gaultier; (France) Joss Lescaf; (Spain) Juan Lucho; (Czech Republic) Lutro; (United Kingdom) Ryan Ryder; (Spain) Nacho Vidal	

=== 2020s ===
Year	Photo	Winner	Nationality	Nominees	Ref(s)
2020 (37th)		Danny D	(United Kingdom) British	(France) Mike Angelo; (Spain) Alberto Blanco; (Czech Republic) Kristof Cale; (France) Vince Carter; (Italy) Christian Clay; (Czech Republic) Charlie Dean; (France) Dorian del Isla; (Spain) Chris Diamond; (Canada) Erik Everhard; (Czech Republic) Angelo Godshack; (France) Joss Lescaf; (Czech Republic) Lutro; (Czech Republic) Neeo; (Italy) Rocco Siffredi	
2021 (38th)		Rocco Siffredi	(Italy) Italian	(France) Mike Angelo; (Spain) Alberto Blanco; (Austria) Marcello Bravo; (Czech Republic) Kristof Cale; (Italy) Christian Clay; (United Kingdom) Danny D; (Czech Republic) Charlie Dean; (France) Dorian del Isla; (Canada) Erik Everhard; (Czech Republic) Angelo Godshack; (Ghana) Freddy Gong; (France) Vince Karter; (France) Joss Lescaf; (United Kingdom) Jay Snakes	
2022 (39th)		Alberto Blanco	(Spain) Spanish	(United Kingdom) Sam Bourne; (Spain) Tommy Cabrio; (Czech Republic) Kristof Cale; (Italy) Christian Clay; (Italy) Raul Costa; (Czech Republic) Charlie Dean; (France) Dorian del Isla; (Canada) Erik Everhard; (Spain) Maximum Garcia; (Czech Republic) Angelo Godshack; (Ghana) Freddy Gong; (France) Vince Carter; (France) Joss Lescaf; (Czech Republic) Steve Q	
2023 (40th)		Danny D	(United Kingdom) British	(Spain) Alberto Blanco; (Austria) Marcello Bravo; (Czech Republic) Kristof Cale; (Italy) Christian Clay; (Czech Republic) Charlie Dean; (Curaçao) Darrell Deeps; (Spain) Chris Diamond; (Canada) Erik Everhard; (Spain) Maximo Garcia; (France) Vince Karter; (France) Joss Lescaf; (France) Ricky Mancini; (France) David Perry; (Netherlands) Aaron Rock	
2024 (41st)		Vince Karter	(France) French	(Spain) Alberto Blanco; (Austria) Marcello Bravo; (Czech Republic) Kristof Cale; (Italy) Christian Clay; (Italy) Raul Costa; (United Kingdom) Danny D; (Spain) Potro de Bilbao; (Czech Republic) Charlie Dean; (Canada) Erik Everhard; (Russia) Tommy Gold; (Ghana) Freddy Gong; (France) David Perry; (Spain) Jordi El Niño Polla; (Netherlands) Aaron Rock	
2025 (42nd)		Christian Clay	(Italy) Italian	(Spain) Alberto Blanco; (Austria) Marcello Bravo; (Czech Republic) Kristof Cale; (Italy) Raul Costa; (United Kingdom) Danny D; (Spain) Potro de Bilbao; (Czech Republic) Charlie Dean; (Canada) Erik Everhard; (Czech Republic) Angelo Godshack; (Russia) Tommy Gold; (Ukraine) Matthew Meier; (Spain) Jordi El Niño Polla; (Netherlands) Aaron Rock; (France) Alex Romero	
2026 (43rd)		Marcello Bravo	(Austria) Austrian	(Spain) Alberto Blanco; (Spain) Jimmy Bud; (Czech Republic) Kristof Cale; (Italy) Raul Costa; (United Kingdom) Danny D; (Czech Republic) Charlie Dean; (Curaçao) Darrell Deeps; (Czech Republic) Angelo Godshack; (Spain) Juan Lucho; (Ukraine) Matthew Meier; (Spain) Jordi El Niño Polla; (United Kingdom) Dimitri Shadow; (France) Ian Scott	

== Superlatives ==
Superlative	Performer	Record
Performer with most awards	(Italy) Rocco Siffredi	10
Performer(s) with most nominations	(Spain) Nacho Vidal	12
Performer(s) with most nominations	(France) David Perry	12
Performer with most consecutive wins	(Italy) Rocco Siffredi (2011-16)	6
Performer with most consecutive nominations	(Hungary) James Brossman (2008-16)	9
Performer with most nominations without ever winning	(Spain) Nacho Vidal	12
Oldest winner	(Italy) Rocco Siffredi	56
Youngest winner	(United Kingdom) Danny D	29
Winner of the most decades	(Italy) Rocco Siffredi (2000s, 2010s, 2020s)	3

== Multiple winners and nominees ==
=== Multiple winners ===
Wins	Performer	Years
10	(Italy) Rocco Siffredi	2003, 2009, 2011, 2012, 2013, 2014, 2015, 2016, 2019, 2021
3	(United Kingdom) Danny D	2017, 2020, 2023
2	(Germany) Steve Holmes	2005, 2006

=== Multiple nominees ===
Nominations	Performer
12	(Spain) Nacho Vidal
12	(France) David Perry
11	(France) Mike Angelo
10	(Czech Republic) George Uhl
9	(Hungary) James Brossman
9	(United Kingdom) Danny D
8	(Czech Republic) Kristof Cale
7	(Spain) Toni Ribas
7	(Hungary) Choky Ice
7	(Italy) Christian Clay
7	(France) Alberto Blanco
7	(Czech Republic) Charlie Dean
6	(Italy) Omar Galanti
6	(Germany) Steve Holmes
6	(Italy) Rocco Siffredi
6	(France) Joss Lescaf
6	(Canada) Erik Everhard
6	(France) Ian Scott
5	(Romania) Mugur
5	(Czech Republic) Neeo
5	(Republic of Ireland) Jazz Duro
4	(Italy) Denis Marti
4	(Venezuela) Franco Roccaforte
4	(Austria) Mick Blue
4	(Morocco) Zenna Raggi
4	(Hungary) Frank Gun
4	(Brazil) Kid Jamaica
4	(United Kingdom) Ryan Ryder
4	(France) Dorian del Isla
4	(Spain) Chris Diamond
4	(France) Vince Carter
4	(Austria) Marcello Bravo
4	(Czech Republic) Angelo Godshack
3	(Italy) Denis Marti
3	(Hungary) Nick Lang
3	(Italy) Christian Devil
3	(Spain) Oliver Sanchez
3	(Hungary) Lauro Giotto
3	(Hungary) Renato
3	(United Kingdom) Marc Rose
3	(Belgium) Pascal White
3	(Ghana) Freddy Gong
3	(Italy) Raul Costa
3	(Spain) Juan Lucho
3	(Spain) Jordi El Niño Polla
2	(France) Tristan Segal
2	(France) Greg Centauro
2	(Russia) Timo Hardy
2	(Czech Republic) Lutro
2	(Hungary) Frank Major
2	(Spain) Pablo Ferrari
2	(Spain) Maximo Garcia
2	(Netherlands) Aaron Rock
2	(Curaçao) Darrell Deeps
2	(Ukraine) Matthew Meier

== See also ==
- AVN Award for Male Performer of the Year
- AVN Award for Best Actor
- AVN Award for Best Supporting Actor
