= Sunny Side Up =

Sunny Side Up may refer to:

- Sunny side up, method of fried egg preparation

== Film and television ==
- Sunny Side Up (1926 film), American silent comedy from DeMille Pictures
- Sunny Side Up (1929 film), American Movietone musical from Fox
- Sunnyside Up, late 1950s and early 1960s TV variety program in Melbourne, Australia
- Sunny Side Up (TV series) or The Sunny Side Up Show, American children's morning show on Sprout

== Music ==
- Sunny Side Up (Lou Donaldson album)
- Sunny Side Up (Paolo Nutini album)
- "Sunny Side Up", section of English rock band Pink Floyd's 1970 instrumental Alan's Psychedelic Breakfast
- "Sunny Side Up", 2015 song by American rock band Faith No More
- "Sunny Side Up!", 2019 song by Korean girl group Red Velvet on their EP The ReVe Festival: Day 1

== Other ==
- Sunny Side Up, 2011 American character doll manufactured by Lalaloopsy

== See also ==
- Sunny Side Up Tropical Festival, annual music festival in Bali, Indonesia
- Sunny Side Upar, an Indian short web film
- Sunnyside (disambiguation)
