= Zoe Holloway =

≠Zoe Holloway may refer to:

- Zoe Holloway, character in Dominion (TV series)
- Zoe Holloway, actress in Portrait of a Call Girl
