= Eva Elfie =

Russian pornographic film actress

- Elfie in 2026
- Born: Yulia Romanova; Omsk, Russia
- Occupations: Pornographic actress; YouTuber
- Years active: 2018–present

Yulia Romanova, (Note: Also transliterated as Yuliya) (Russian: Юлия Романова) known professionally as Eva Elfie (Russian: Ева Эльфи), is a Russian pornographic actress and YouTuber. She won the AVN Award for Best New Foreign Starlet in 2021.

== Biography ==
Yulia Romanova, known professionally as Eva Elfie, was born in Omsk, Siberia. After graduating from high school, she moved to Moscow in 2018, where she worked as a manager and a waitress. Previously, she had also worked as a correspondent for a TV channel in her native city of Omsk. In February 2019, Elfie created her channel on Pornhub. By February the next year, her first video had more than 53 million views. In early November 2020, Elfie was ranked fourth in the Pornhub ranking.

In October 2020, Elfie won her first award, the XBIZ Europa Award in the category "Female Clip Artist of the Year". In January 2021, she won the AVN Award for "Best New Foreign Starlet".

== Awards ==
- 2020 XBIZ Europa Award – Female Clip Artist of the Year
- 2021 AVN Award – Best New Foreign Starlet
- 2021 AltPorn Award – Fan Favorite Female Performer of the Year
- 2022 AVN Award – Favorite Indie Clip Star
- 2022 Pornhub Award – Most Popular Female Performer by Women
- 2022 Pornhub Award – Nicest Pussy
- 2023 XBIZ Award – Clip Artist of the Year
- 2023 Pornhub Award – Most Popular Female Performer by Women
- 2024 AVN Award – Best International All-Girl Sex Scene (with Little Caprice) – Dollhouse 2

== Outside pornography ==
In 2020, Elfie appeared as a playable character in Nutaku's dating sim Booty Calls. In 2021, she presented the football kit of the Italian club Venezia, which made it to Serie A for the first time in 20 years.

Elfie is engaged in the esports community. She planned to contribute funds from her OnlyFans account to the Dota 2 TI12 tournament prize pool, though the winners turned her down. She also appeared in an ad campaign alongside Aurora Gaming's Counter-Strike 2 team.

Elfie is referenced in the online game War Thunder, with a decal that can be applied to in-game player vehicles.

== Filmography ==
=== Pornography ===
- Petite HD Porn 28: Too Naughty To Say No (2019)
- Shower Solos (2020)
- True Amateurs Blondes Edition (2020)
- Me, Myself and I 2 (2021)
- Icons 5 (2022)
- Drip 2 (2023)
- Young & Beautiful 11 (2023)
- GG Movie Night (2023)
- True Amateurs: Solos 5 (2025)

=== Documentary ===
- Artem & Eva (2022), a documentary directed by Evgeniy Milykh about Elfie and her partner Artem.

=== Music ===
On 16 October 2026, Elfie released her debut single, "Fairyland", an electronic track that premiered on Vice's music site Noisey. Magnetic Magazine wrote that the single was presented as the start of a new artistic phase built around underground electronic music. Elfie said she had been making music for about two years and cited French electronic music, including early releases by KAS:ST, as an influence. She named "Body" as her next release.
