= Ian Scott (actor) =

French pornographic actor and director (born 1973)

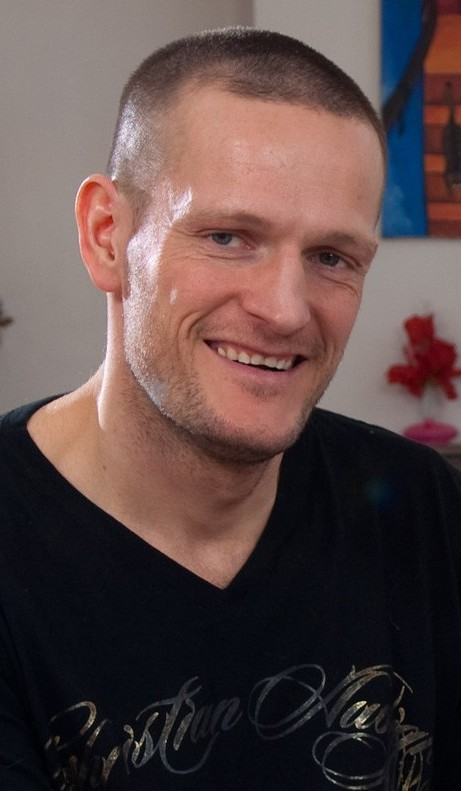
- Born: 6 February 1973 (age 53); Conflans-Sainte-Honorine, France
- Other names: Ian Stone, Yanick Schaft, Yannick Shaft, Yannik, Yanick Damp, Jan Scoot, Ian Scot, J. Scott, Yann Scoth, Jean Scoot, Yann Legall, Martin Kalif, Yannick, Jan Scott, Yan Scott, Yann Scott, Iannick Simon, Yann Claus, Yannick Dambrinne, Yannick Dure, Yanick D., Yanick Shaft, Gerard D'Matant, Yannik Noah
- Height: 6 ft 1 in (1.85 m)
- Spouse: Océane

Ian Scott (born 6 February 1973) is a French pornographic actor and director starting from 1996 and is still active. He is also known by the aliases Yannick and Yanick Shaft. He has performed in over 2,200 films.

== Biography ==
Ian Scott began a career in pornography in 1996, when he was 23 years old, in a film by Patrice Cabanel. In 1999, he was credited as Yannick Dambrinne and performed in a French porn called Wild Wild West, directed by Fabien Lafait.

In 2000, he played one of the rapists in the controversial film Baise-moi by Virginie Despentes. Also, that year was the first time he was directed by Fred Coppula in Niqueurs-nés, an X-rated parody of Natural Born Killers. He then appeared in Max, portrait d'un sérial niqueur, a fake documentary, where he played the lead role. The next year, he wrote and directed, Max 2 and, in 2006 and 2007, Max 3. In La Collectionneuse, Clara Morgane and her boyfriend Greg Centauro appear with Scott. In 2010, he appeared with Julia Alexandratou in a film, produced by Sirina Entertainment. Starting in 2001, Scott also started to regularly work in American productions.

Scott participates in triathlons and downhill mountain bike races. As of 2015, he is still active and has appeared in over 1,300 films.

== Awards and nominations ==
- 2001 Hot d'Or Award winner – Best European Actor
- 2008 AVN Award nominee – Male Foreign Performer of the Year
- 2009 AVN Award nominee – Best Sex Scene in a Foreign Shot Production (Cherry Jul's Extreme Gangbang Party)
- 2009 AVN Award nominee – Best Double Penetration Sex Scene (The Jenny Hendrix Anal Experience)
