= Julia Alexandratou =

Julia Alexandratou Τζούλια Αλεξανδράτου
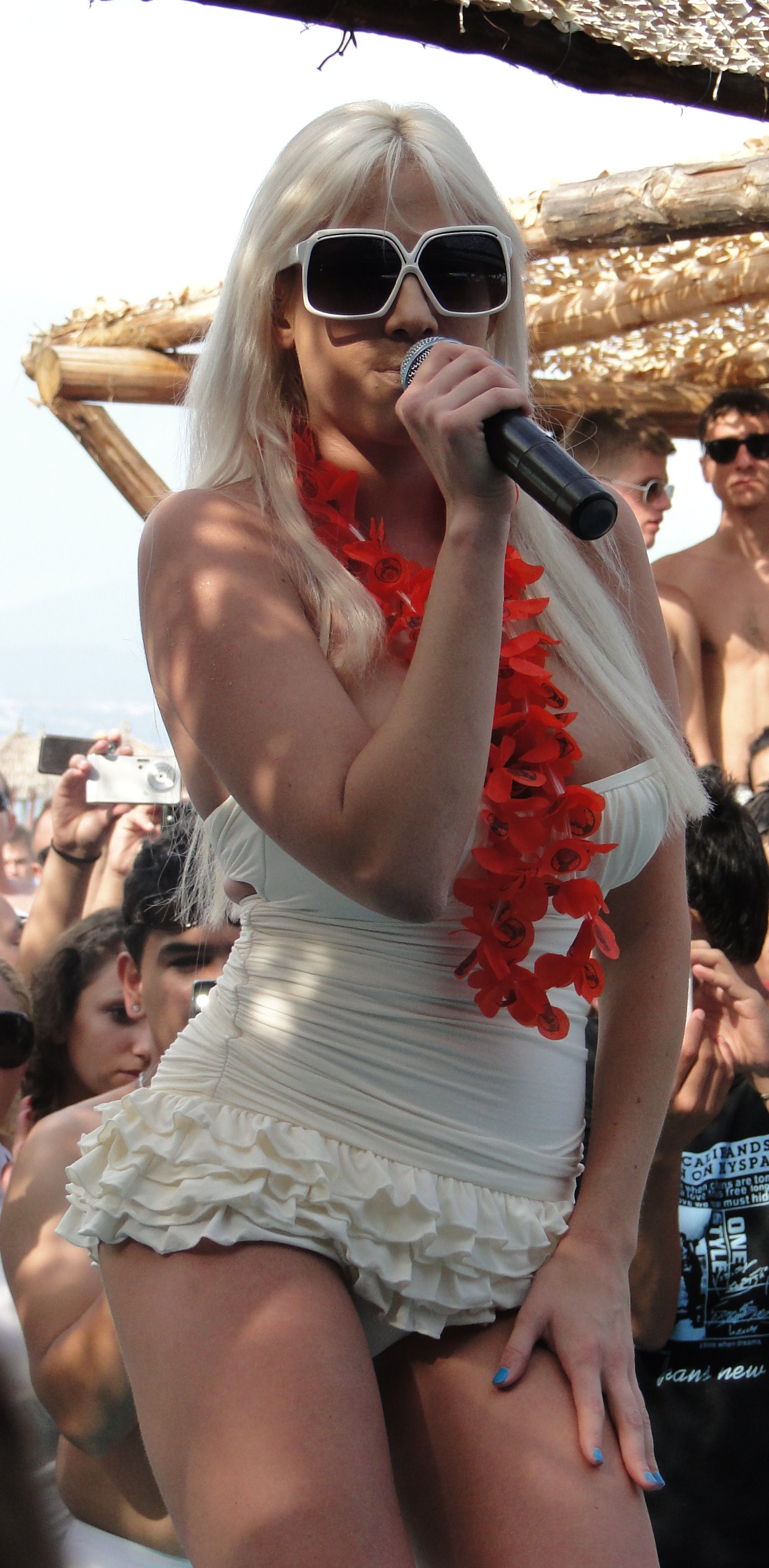
- Born: Glyfada, Attica, Greece
- Occupations: Glamour model, singer, actress, pornographic actress
- Beauty pageant titleholder
- Title: B Star Hellas 2006; Miss Young 2002; Miss Greece International 2006
- Musical career
- Genres: Pop, dance-pop, club

Julia Alexandratou (Greek: Τζούλια Αλεξανδράτου) is a Greek socialite, media personality, glamour model, singer, actress, and pornographic actress. In 2002, at age 16, she won the beauty pageant title "Miss Young" in Greece. Four years later, Alexandratou won the title "Miss Greece International 2006" (also called the "Runner-up Star Hellas 2006") at the Miss Star Hellas beauty pageant. In 2010, a controversial celebrity sex tape featuring Alexandratou was released. She later admitted that she was paid for her participation in the film. In 2011, Alexandratou attracted controversy again, after the release of a second pornographic video.

== Biography ==
Julia Alexandratou has modeled since the age of four and has also participated in and won a lot of beauty pageants. At age seven, she enrolled in ballet lessons, and later on in vocal and acting training, where she is said to have exhibited great potential. In 2002, at the age of 16, Alexandratou entered the "Miss Young" beauty pageant where she won first place.

=== Career ===
==== 2006–2009: modeling, hosting, and music ====
In 2006, Alexandratou participated in the 17th edition of the annual Miss Star Hellas beauty pageant which took place on 9 April 2006 (semi-final) and 11 April 2006 (final).

She made her first appearance after the competition on the live Greek reality show Fame Story 4, and was a guest singer on the Greek song, "Mono Ya Sena" (Only For You) with Fame Story 3 contestant Andreas Constantinidis. The duet was featured as the first single on his debut album, while they also filmed a music video together for the song.

A few months later, Alexandratou became a co-host to the Greek TV show Megalicious Chart Live!, alongside MAD TV presenter Themis Georgandas. During that period, she made many television appearances, and in the course of one year, appeared on over 10 magazine covers, including magazines such as Vogue, Nitro, Diva and Celebrity.

Her subsequent fame led to her hosting a TV show called Music Bee, along with her friend Stathis Etiatoglou. The show debuted to high expectations, with a format focusing on music news in Greece and abroad. However, ratings of the show soon dropped.

In 2007, she released two singles with Sony Music Entertainment Greece titled I Vassilissa tis Pistas (The Queen of the Dance Floor) and Stohos Ine ta Lefta (The Target Is Money), respectively. That same year, Alexandratou made her film debut in a Greek comedy directed by Nikos Perakis, playing the role of a singer named Areti. Stohos Ine ta Lefta served as the theme song to the film.

In April 2008, Alexandratou posed on the cover of Nitro magazine, assuming the role of Marilyn Monroe. She was voted by readers of the magazine as the best choice to perform the special edition spread. In the autumn of the same year, she started performing in her first concert appearances at an Athenian nightclub alongside Greek singer Panos Kalidis. In late 2008, she released her single Honolulu, which is a cover of a song written by Nikos Karvelas. Karvelas later expressed outrage that the song was covered without his consent.

==== 2010–present: pornographic videos ====
On 3 March 2010, a DVD depicting Alexandratou having sex with a then-unidentified male began being sold in many spots around Greece. The man's face can't be seen throughout the entire video and for a period after the DVD's release there was an unconfirmed rumor that the man is pornographic actor Ian Scott. When first asked by reporters about this video, Alexandratou and her manager, Menios Fourthiotis, stated that this was the first time they heard about it and that they thought that it was a joke or a blackmail attempt.

Nevertheless, the owner of Sirina Entertainment (the company which distributed the DVD), Dimitris Sirinakis, stated: "I can't reveal how or from whom I got the sex tape, but I can assure you that it was obtained legally." A day after its release, over 200,000 copies of the DVD were said to have been sold. Shortly after the DVD's release, Alexandratou appeared on one of Star Channel's newscasts, on which she claimed that the pornographic video was filmed exclusively for personal use and she also stated, without revealing the unidentified man's real identity, that his first name was Giorgos and that it was him who leaked the video, to harm her public image.

On 17 March 2010, Alexandratou appeared on Greek host Tatiana Stefanidou's TV show Axizi na to Dis, on which she admitted that she was paid in advance for her participation in the video, thus confirming that it is a professional pornographic video and not an amateur one. The DVD sold over 100,000 copies at news stands.

On 29 November 2010, Alexandratou began hosting a once weekly show on local Athenian television station Extra 3.

On 4 February 2011, a second DVD produced by Sirina Entertainment was released in Greece with Alexandratou starring along with two male black pornographic actors. The DVD is considered a sequel of the first video, since it is titled Julia 2 Mavri (Julia 2 Blacks). In the adult film, Julia appears to walk naked in the streets of Voula seeking for love, which she eventually finds. The scenes feature explicit sexual acts, in the form of hardcore pornography.

== Discography ==
=== Singles ===
- Mono Gia Sena (duet with Andreas Konstantinidis) (2006)
- I Vassilissa tis Pistas (2007)
- Stohos Ine ta Lefta (2007)
- Honolulu (2008)

=== Music videos ===
- Mono Gia Sena (2006)
- I Vassilissa tis Pistas (2007)
- Psychremia: Main Theme (2007)
- Stohos Ine ta Lefta (2007)
- Honolulu (2008)

== Filmography ==
=== Film ===
Year	Title	Role	Notes	Ref.
2007	Cool	Areti Olsen	Film debut	
2010	Julia Alexandratou: The Forbidden	Herself	Adult film debut	
2011	The Pontians: New Generation	Agnes		
2011	Julia 2 Black	Herself	Adult film	
2011	Greek Male Casting: Searching for a new star	Herself	Adult film	
2012	Julia is back: Doctor's casting	Herself	Adult film	

=== Television ===
Year	Title	Role(s)	Notes
2002	National Annual Beauty Pageant of Greece	Herself (contestant)	Miss Young '02
2006	National Annual Beauty Pageant of Greece	Herself (contestant)	Substitute Star Hellas '06
2006	Fame Story 4	Herself (performance)	Live 9; season 4
2006	Megalicious Chart Live	Herself (co-host)	Sunday talk show on Mega Channel
2006	Music Bee	Herself (host)	Saturday talk show on ANT1
2007	Greece's Got Talent	Herself (guest)	Season 1
2007	TV Stars: Let's present yourself	Herself (guest)	Live 11
2010-2011	With Julia	Herself (host)	Late night talk show on EXTRA 3
2019	Miss Europe Beauty Contest	Herself (contestant)	1st Runner-up

=== Music videos ===
Year	Music video	Artist	Notes
2006	"Only For You"	Herself & Andreas Konstantinou	Music debut
2007	"The Queen of the Dance Floor"	Herself	
2007	"The Target Is Money"	Herself	
2008	"Honolulu"	Herself	
2016	"Only Love"	Herself & Agapi Mono	
2016	"My Crazy Face"	Herself & Agapi Mono	
