= Marcello Bravo =

Austrian pornographic actor, director and film producer

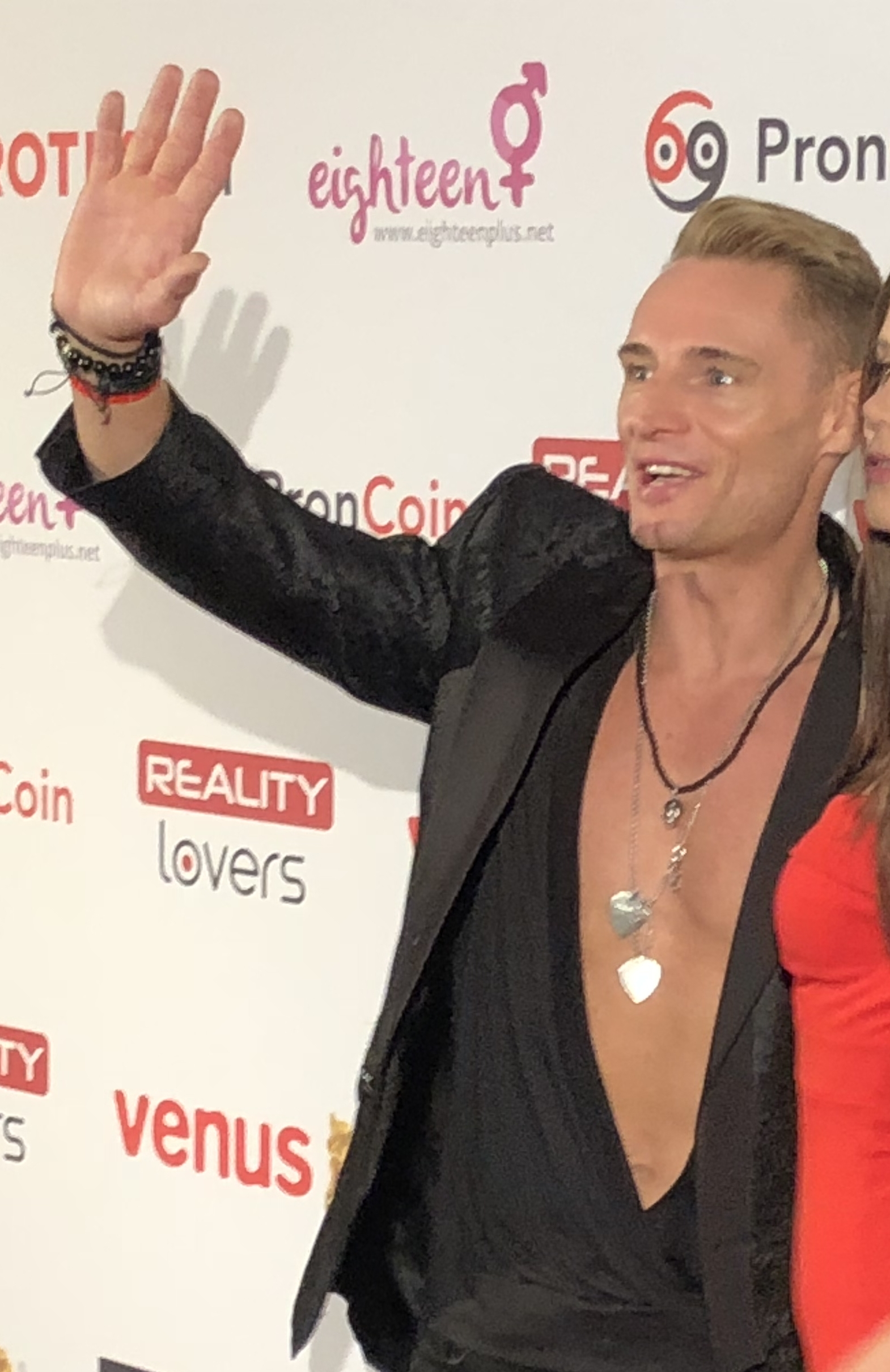
- Marcello Bravo in Berlin in 2018
- Born: Markus Schlögl; 4 January 1978 (age 48); Mödling, Austria
- Occupations: Pornographic actor Film director Film producer
- Years active: 2008–present
- Spouse: Little Caprice (m. 2015)
- Website: littlecaprice-dreams.com

Markus Schlögl (born 4 January 1978), known professionally as Marcello Bravo, is an Austrian pornographic actor, director and film producer for the studio Little Caprice Dreams.

== Career ==
After completing elementary and high school, Bravo learned the trades of auto mechanic and electrician. During this time, he played football for the club Rapid Vienna, practiced martial arts and trained in various fitness centers. At the age of 25, he took up striptease and acrobatics. In addition to aerial silks, he was an award-winning professional pole dancer. Bravo was a four time Austrian State Champion, and one time World Champion.

In 2008, Bravo started his career as a pornographic actor. In 2015, he married Czech pornographic actress, Little Caprice (real name Markéta Štroblová), who became his business partner in the adult industry. He worked for major companies such as X-art, Marc Dorcel, CamSoda, Vixen, and Tushy until he founded his own production company, Little Caprice Dreams, with his wife in 2016. Since the creation of Little Caprice Dreams, Marcello has gone on to direct, produce and star in content by the company.

In 2018 and 2019, Bravo was named Best Actor International at Venus Berlin. In 2018, he won the XBIZ Award for best sex scene with Little Caprice. In addition to numerous nominations at the AVN Awards in Las Vegas from 2016 to 2020, he was on the list in 2021 with eleven awards in the categories of director, actor and film scene.

In 2020, Bravo took on the lead role in the online game, Chick Empire, which also starred other models including his wife.

In December 2020, Bravo and Little Caprice were featured in a double page in the German-language Playboy, as well as in the 'Magazine Woman' and in the Kronen Zeitung. Between 2016 and 2021, Bravo and Caprice created ten exclusive series such as Xpervo, Caprice Divas, Wecumtoyou, NASSTY, POVdreams, Pornlifestyle, SuperprivateX with their production company.

In January 2021, Bravo won his first prize as a director at the AVN Awards with the scene Tender Kiss (Little Caprice and Liya Silver), as well as his second AVN Award as director in 2022 with the scene Luscious (Little Caprice and Lotti Magne). He played the role of Igor, a Russian mafia boss, in the 2022 film Revenge. He also played the leading role in the 2023 film Missing, produced by Marc Dorcel. In 2023/2024 he received seven nominations at the AVN Awards in all categories (director, actor, best pov, best anal, best sex scene, best group scene, best oral scene). In 2024, Bravo won his first Director of the Year award at the Erots festival in Prague. In 2025/26 he was nominated 12 times at the AVN Awards and won 4 awards. His highlight was the best international male performer in 2026.

== Filmography ==
- 2008: Fit to Fuck
- 2009: Fuck
- 2011: Curtain Up
- 2014: Two by Two
- 2015: Exite Me
- 2015: Lovers Lane
- 2016: Sharing my Wife
- 2017: Couples Fantasy
- 2018: More than Porn Vol. 1: Little Caprice Dreams
- 2018: More than Porn Vol. 2: Little Caprice Dreams
- 2019: Caprice Divas Vol. 1: Little Caprice Dreams
- 2019: Wecumtoyou Vol. 1 Little Caprice Dreams
- 2019: Young & Beautiful 8
- 2020: Natural Beauties 13
- 2020: Xpervo Vol 1.: Little Caprice Dreams
- 2020: You Deserve a Treat Joymii
- 2016 - Present: Series Creator - Xpervo, Caprice Divas, WeCumToYou, NASSTY, POVdreams, Pornlifestyle, SuperPrivateX on Little Caprice Dreams
- 2022 - Nominated AVN Las Vegas, Best Directing – Banner/Network
- 2022 Leading actor Film Revenge, by Marc Dorcel.
- 2023 Leading actor Film Missing, by Marc Dorcel.
- 2023 Leading actor Film The price of temptation, by Marc Dorcel.
- 2024 Leading actor Film Buttmuse Ass Packed, by Little Caprice Dreams
- 2024 Leading actor Film Buttmuse Behind the Silence by Little Caprice Dreams
- 2024 Leading actor Film Xpervo Surreal Moment by Little Caprice Dreams
- 2024 Leading actor Xpervo Said & Done by Little Caprice Dreams
- 2024 Leading actor Xpervo Her deepest wishes 1/2 by Little Caprice Dreams
- Leading actor Xpervo Roomer Seduced by Little Caprice Dreams
- 2025 Produced, Direct & Act in his first Blockbuster WecumtoyouLove & Lust
- 2025 Produced, Direct & Act in his second Blockbuster Mr.Nice

== Awards ==
- 2013-2016 : Mister Pole Dance Austria
- 2014 : Pole sport Roma Gold
- 2015 : International Pole Sports Federation in London Bronze
- 2015 : Las Vegas Pole Expo Silver
- 2015 : Mr Pole Dance Global (World Champion)
- 2015 : Pole Art Geneva Bronze
- 2016 : Las Vegas for Pole Expo Bronze
- 2018 : XBIZ Award Best Sex Scene (with Little Caprice)
- 2018 : Venus Award – Best Actor International
- 2019 : Venus Award – Best Actor International
- 2021: AVN Las Vegas - Nominated six times - Including AVN Award for Male Foreign Performer of the Year
- 2021 : AVN Las Vegas Winner Best Foreign - Shot All - Girl Sex Scene: (directed & edited Marcello Bravo)
- 2021 : Winner XBiz Europa Award - Performer/Director Site of the Year (Littlecaprice-dreams.com)
- 2022 : AVN - AVN Award for Best International Girl Girl Scene by Little Caprice Dreams[10] Director & Editor Marcello Bravo
- 2022 : Winner XBiz Europa Award - Performer/Director Site of the Year (Littlecaprice-dreams.com)
- 2022–23 : AVN Las Vegas nominated 9 times
- 2023: AVN - AVN Award for Best International Girl Girl Scene by Little Caprice Dreams - Producer, * Director & Editor Marcello Bravo
- 2023 XBIZ Europa Awards 5 Nominees Announced
- 2023/24 AVN Las Vegas Awards 7 Nominees Announced
- 2023/24 AVN Las Vegas Award Best International Group Sex Scene (WeCumToYou/Little Caprice Dreams)
- 2024 Czech Erotic Awards – Best Foreign Director 2023
- 2024 Xbiz Amsterdam Performer / Director Website of the Year
- 2025 AVN Awards 11 Nominees Announced
- 2025 XBZ 11 Nominations in almost each category
- 2025 Xbiz Amsterdam Performer / Director Website of the Year
- 2025 Xbiz Amsterdam Best Sex Scene — All-Sex: series Buttmuse Anal Divas, Little Caprice Dreams (Little Caprice, Marcello Bravo, Catherine Knight)
- 2025/26 AVN Awards 2026 – 14 nominations
- 2026 Male Foreign Performer of the Year.
- 2026 best group sex scene Wecumtoyou Love & Lust Blockbuster, Marcello Bravo, little caprice, Eve sweet, Matthew Meiers
- 2026 Best International BG scene with little caprice & Marcello Bravo Mr Nice
- 2026 best gonzo series Superprivatex - Little Caprice Dreams
- 2026 Prague, Best Director 2026
- 2026 Winner XBiz Europa Award
- 2026 Winner XBIZ Award
