= Little Caprice =

Czech pornographic film actress

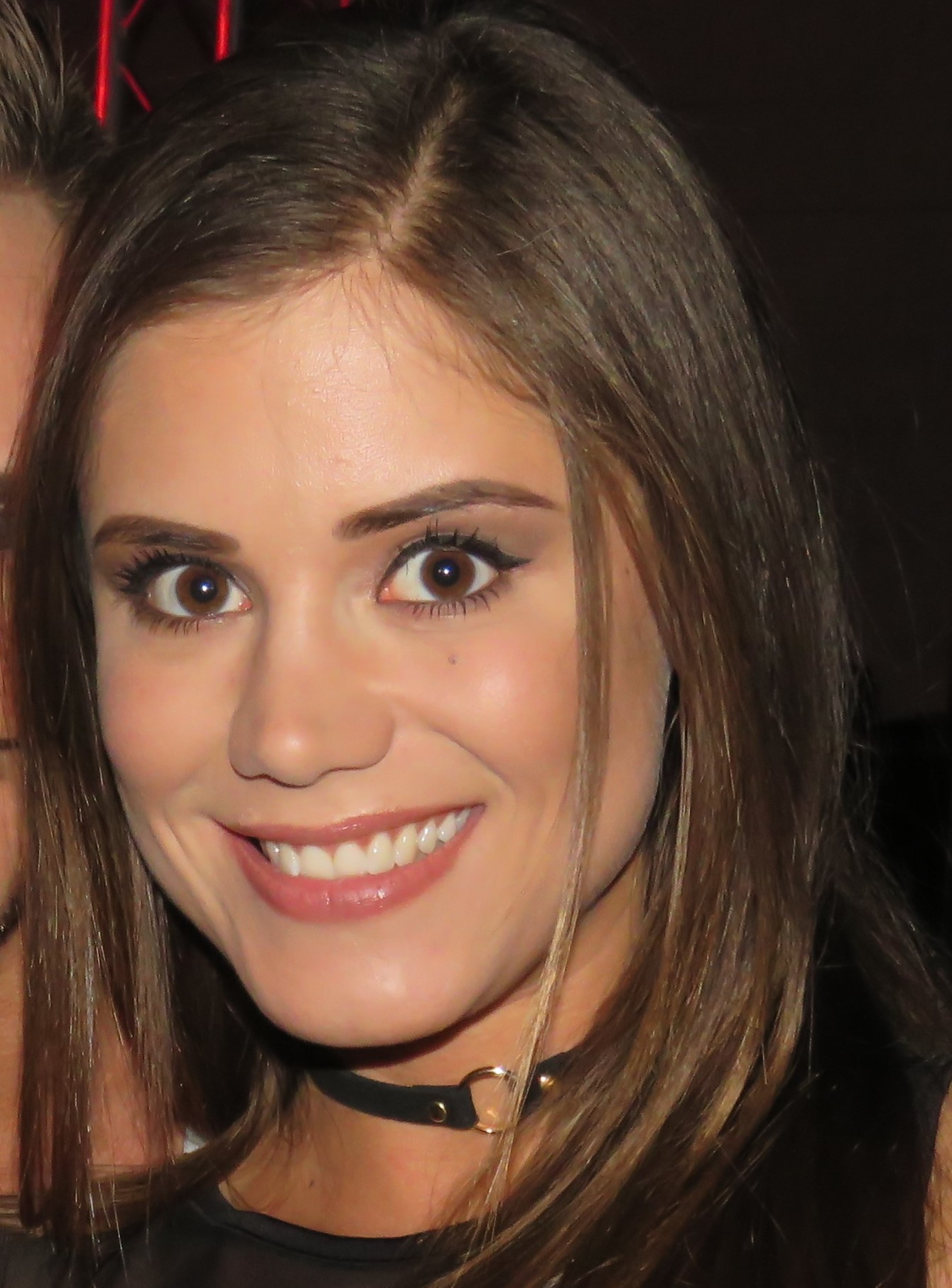
- Little Caprice in 2017
- Born: Markéta Štroblová; 26 October 1988 (age 38); Brno, Czechoslovakia
- Other names: Caprice; Lola
- Occupations: Pornographic film actress; model
- Spouse: Marcello Bravo (m. 2015)
- Website: littlecaprice-dreams.com

Markéta Štroblová (born 26 October 1988), known professionally as Little Caprice, is a Czech pornographic film actress. Štroblová has won the AVN Award for Female Foreign Performer of the Year three times in 2020, 2022, and 2023, and for Best All-Girl Scene four times in a row from 2021 to 2024.

== Early life ==
Štroblová was born in Brno, Czechoslovakia (now the Czech Republic). After completing a degree in nutrition, she worked in the food and beverage industry.

== Career ==
Štroblová began working in the adult entertainment industry in 2008 under the stage name Little Caprice.

In 2016, she launched her own adult website, "Littlecaprice.com", and later established a production company with her husband, Austrian performer Marcello Bravo. She was nominated for an AVN Award for Best Boy/Girl Sex Scene for the scene "In Love With Little Caprice". She also appeared as a streaker in a television advertising campaign for the Austrian beverage brand Almdudler.

She won the AVN Award for Female Foreign Performer of the Year in 2020, 2022 and 2023.

In 2024, Štroblová appeared in the second series of the Czech television series Sex O'Clock, released on the streaming service Voyo.

By 2025, she had mostly stopped performing for other productions, and was primarily working behind the camera for her own production company.

== Personal life ==
Štroblová is bisexual. In 2015, Štroblová married Austrian pornographic film actor Markus Schlögl, known professionally as Marcello Bravo, her partner in the adult industry.

== Awards ==
- 2013 July Twistys Treat
- 2016 Queen of Erotic
- 2018 XBIZ Europa Award – Best Sex Scene - Glamcore (with Marcello Bravo) – Anal Beauty 10
- 2018 Venus Award – Best Actress
- 2018 Best Newcomer Website – LittleCaprice-Dreams.com
- 2018 Best Erotic Website Czech Republic – LittleCaprice-Dreams.com
- 2019 Venus Award – Best Actress International
- 2019 Athens Erotic Art – Best Actress EU
- 2019 Athens Erotic Art – Best Membership Website EU – LittleCaprice-Dreams.com
- 2019 February Vixen Angel
- 2020 AVN Award – Female Foreign Performer of the Year
- 2021 AVN Award – Best Foreign-Shot All-Girl Sex Scene (with Liya Silver) – Tender Kiss Little Caprice and Liya Silver
- 2021 XBIZ Europa Award – Performer Site of the Year – LittleCaprice-Dreams.com
- 2022 AVN Award – Female Foreign Performer of the Year
- 2022 AVN Award – Best International Group Sex Scene (with Apolonia Lapiedra, Emily Willis, & Alberto Blanco) – Vibes 4
- 2022 AVN Award – Best International Lesbian Sex Scene (with Lottie Magne) – Caprice Divas Luscious
- 2022 XBIZ Europa Award – Performer/Director Site of the Year – LittleCaprice-Dreams.com
- 2023 AVN Award – Female Foreign Performer of the Year
- 2023 AVN Award – Best International All-Girl Sex Scene (with Agatha Vega) – Wonder Woman
- 2024 AVN Award – Best International All-Girl Sex Scene (with Eva Elfie) – Dollhouse 2
- 2024 AVN Award – Best International Group Sex Scene (with Rika Fane, Stanley Johnson, & Marcello Bravo) – Newly Engaged Swingers
- 2024 Czech Erotic Award – Best Czech Female Performer
- 2024 XBIZ Europa Award – Performer/Director Site of the Year – LittleCaprice-Dreams.com
- 2025 XMA Europa Award – Best Sex Scene - All Sex (with Catherine Knight & Marcello Bravo) – Buttmuse Anal Divas
- 2025 XMA Europa Award – Performer/Director Site of the Year – LittleCaprice-Dreams.com
- 2026 AVN Award – Best International Group Sex Scene (with Eve Sweet, Marcello Bravo, & Matthew Meier) – WeCumToYou: Love & Lust Episode 3
- 2026 AVN Award – Best International Boy/Girl Sex Scene (with Marcello Bravo) – The Boss
- 2026 AVN Award – Best Gonzo/Cinemacore Movie or Series – SuperprivateX
- 2026 XMA Europa Award – Performer/Director Site of the Year – LittleCaprice-Dreams.com
