= Dimitris Sirinakis =

Greek erotic films director and producer (born 1974)

Dimitris Sirinakis Δημήτρης Σειρηνάκης
- Born: 18 October 1974 (age 52); Palaio Faliro, Attica, Greece
- Occupations: Director and Producer of Pornographic film
- Website: Sirina.tv

Dimitris Sirinakis (Greek: Δημήτρης Σειρηνάκης) is a Greek erotic films director and producer. He is also the founder of Sirina Entertainment, and the owner of Sirina TV, the first Greek TV channel featuring adult content, that broadcasts via OTE TV.

== Biography ==
Sirinakis was born in Palaio Faliro, Athens on 18 October 1974. He served his military service as a member of the Special Forces. In 2000, he founded Sirina Entertainment, the first Greek erotic film production company with an international appeal.

== Career and Sirina Entertainment ==
With the completion of his military service, Dimitris Sirinakis studied business management in Washington University and upon its graduation, he worked for a multinational company. In 2000, he began his career in the sensual films industry, as an exclusive distributor of international erotic films in Greece (e.g. Hustler, Marc Dorcel, etc.) In 2007 he started directing and producing his own erotic films, where one may enjoy the performance of Greek models.

Dimitris Sirinakis is said to be the only professional erotic film producer in Greece, while Sirina Entertainment's productions have met with great success in the Greek market.

In 2010, his famous cooperation with actress/model Julia Alexandratou and the release of her sex DVD “Banned”, marked a peak time in Sirina Entertainment producer's career. The tumult brought by the release of the DVD surpassed Greek borders, while top media channels reported extensively on the subject. The aftereffects of the release of Julia Alexandratou's sex tape were quite impressive, as foreign media even talked about an effort of manipulating public opinion, due to the fact that the release occurred at the same time as the IMF bailout program for Greece. Meanwhile, numerous Greek TV shows and features dealt with the issue for months.

Although initially, Julia Alexandratou argued that the DVD content was about personal footage that was leaked by one of her exes, after 13 days Julia Alexandratou finally admitted the whole truth in Tatiana Stefanidou's a TV show. She confessed that everything was legally agreed between both parties; she signed a contract with the production company that was submitted to the revenue office, she was properly paid and the relevant invoice was issued.

In any case, the success of the Julia Alexandratou film was used as an excuse for questioning Greek showbiz taboos, regarding sensual productions. Soon after that, more big names, such as Marianna Douvli, Voula Vavatsi, and Christina Rousaki, followed Julia's lead.

The scandalous style, which is typical in Dimitrinis Sirinakis productions, involves the participation of showbiz names and the use of provocative sets, as well as his ability of taking advantage of publicity. All the above contributed equally to the promotion of Sirina Entertainment in Greece and abroad.

== Company Expansion ==
In 2007, Sirina Entertainment was involved with print media, publishing the newspaper Sirina news and the monthly magazine Sirina.

=== Sirina News ===
Sirina News was the first-ever politics-gossip newspaper available in stands that offered two DVDs as freebies: an erotic film, produced by Sirina Entertainment, and an action movie.

=== Awards and recognition ===
- 2004: “Best Development for Eroticism in Greece” Award, in the Brussels International Festival of Eroticism
- 2008: Honorary Award in the 7th Festival of Greek Cult Cinema: “For its overall contribution and bold achievements in the field of the 7th art”.
