= Jessie Andrews =

American actress

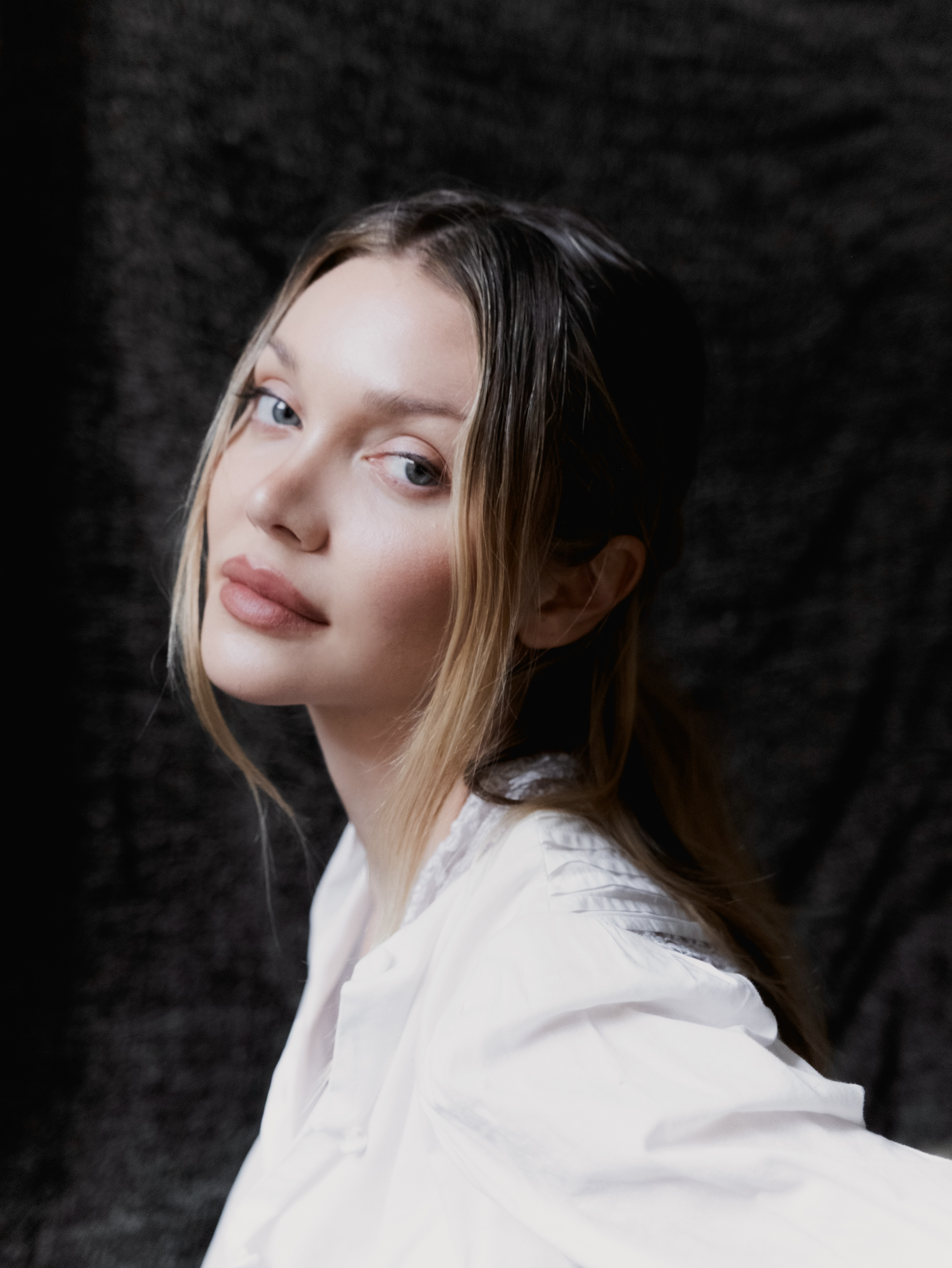
- Andrews in 2025
- Born: 1991 or 1992 (age 34–35)
- Occupations: Actress; model; designer
- Years active: 2010–2017 (pornography); 2012–2016 (music); 2012–present (designer); 2017–present (mainstream TV and film)
- Notable work: Euphoria, Love Bomb, Hot Summer Nights
- Website: jessieandrewsofficial.com

Jessie Andrews (born 1991 or 1992) is an American actress, fashion designer, and model. Starting out as a pornographic film actress, she received an AVN Award for Best Actress for her performance in Portrait of a Call Girl (2011). More recently, she has appeared in mainstream film and television roles, including Hot Summer Nights (2017) and Euphoria (2022).

In 2012, Andrews launched her own jewelry line Bagatiba (bagātība being Latvian for opulence). She has modeled for clothing companies such as American Apparel as well as for fashion designer Kim Shui's presentation for New York Fashion Week.

== Career ==
=== Pornographic films ===
Raised in Miami, Andrews worked as a sales associate for American Apparel while in high school. There, one of her friends who had worked as an extra in an adult film told her "how much she made for showing her boobs," which motivated Andrews to look for work in the industry. A week after her 18th birthday, she began performing in pornographic films, dividing her time between Miami and Los Angeles. By age 21, she had performed in over 140 adult films, mostly with other women.

In 2011, Andrews appeared in the film Portrait of a Call Girl, receiving an award for best actress from the trade magazine Adult Video News. The next year, she was featured in the music video for ex-boyfriend Borgore's song "Decisions", which also featured Miley Cyrus.

In January 2014, Andrews, Dana DeArmond, Asa Akira, and Chanel Preston were featured in a Cosmopolitan article titled "4 Porn Stars on How They Stay Fit". The article was inspired by actress Gabrielle Union's comment made on Conan O'Brien's talk show about striving to follow the fitness routines of the porn stars she saw at her gym.

Andrews has also written a sex advice column for Galore magazine.

=== Modeling and design ===
Andrews became one of the few pornographic film actress to break through to the mainstream, and was proclaimed an "it girl" by GQ, and Hypebae before getting scouted while shopping at an American Apparel store to be the brand's exclusive model. She later transitioned to a successful modeling career, appearing on the covers of LA Weekly, Monster Children, and C-Heads.

In July 2012, Andrews started designing fine jewelry as a personal project. Jewelry from her Bagatiba line has been worn by Bella Hadid, Kendall Jenner, and the Kardashians. As the company grew, it received coverage from Vogue and Refinery29. Her online store became one of the top performing stores on Shopify. Simultaneously, Andrews launched two other fashion brands: Basic Swim, a collection of minimalist swimwear styles and Jeu Illimité, a Parisian-inspired ready-to-wear essentials line. Andrews oversees all three lines out of her downtown Los Angeles headquarters — 1201 B Studios.

By age 26, Andrews was interviewed by Coveteur and Paper magazine on her work in the fashion industry. In an interview with Coveteur, she said, "Porn and deejaying were careers that I knew weren't going to have longevity. I wanted to be able to build a future for myself, so I had given them a time cap. When I felt that I did as much as I could in that career, I was like, 'OK, what's next?' Designing is fulfilling, but I think owning your own brand and learning every different aspect of a business is what keeps me fulfilled and occupied."

=== Music ===
In November 2012, Andrews released a remix for Anna Lunoe & Flume's "I Met You" and made it available for free download. In December, she released her remix of Disclosure and Sam Smith's "Latch".

In October and November 2013, Andrews embarked on a Canadian tour as a DJ. She performed in Montreal, Thunder Bay, Victoria, Edmonton, Vancouver and Calgary. Andrews also toured in Asia playing FLY in Singapore, We the Fest in Jakarta and Sunny Side Up Festival at Potato Head in Bali. In 2015, Andrews toured across North America playing to larger crowds in bigger venues like Marquee New York City, Exchange L.A, LIV Miami and Ultra Music Festival also in Miami. In November 2015 Andrews toured nationally across Australia with the largest festival in that country Stereosonic playing in Sydney, Melbourne, Perth, Adelaide and Brisbane as well as a sideshow in Sydney with Diplo. In 2016, Andrews released another single, "Slowly", through OneLove Recordings.

==== Singles ====
Title	Year	Label
"I Never Knew"	2013	Ultra Records
"In Motion" EP	2014	ZIVS/Metropolis Records
"You Won't Forget Tonight"	2014	Ultra Records
"Usually Deep" EP	2015	ZIVS/Metropolis Records
"GRIND"	2015	OneLove Recordings
"Slowly"	2015	OneLove Recordings

==== Remix EPs ====
Title	Details	Tracklist
I Never Knew (Remixes)	Released: 2013; Label: Ultra Records; Formats: Digital download	I Never Knew (Bais Haus Remix); I Never Knew (Fei-Fei's Faded Remix); I Never Knew (Jen Lasher Faded Remix); I Never Knew (Prince Club Remix); I Never Knew (TJANI Remix)
I Never Knew (Remixes)	Released: 2013; Label: Ultra Records; Formats: Digital download	I Never Knew (Bais Haus Remix); I Never Knew (Fei-Fei's Faded Remix); I Never Knew (Jen Lasher Faded Remix); I Never Knew (Prince Club Remix); I Never Knew (TJANI Remix)
I Never Knew (Remixes)	Released: 2014; Label: M:UK; Formats: Digital download	You Won't Forget Tonight ft. Comets Will Fall; You Won't Forget Tonight ft. Comets Will Fall (Document One Remix); You Won't Forget Tonight ft. Comets Will Fall (Indian Summer Remix)

=== Mainstream film ===
Andrews landed the lead role in the film Love Bomb (2025) on Amazon Prime Video and has also written, directed, and acted in her first short film Tell Me Something (2025).

== Personal life ==
Andrews is of mixed heritage. She is of Chinese and Latvian descent. On her father's side, she is one quarter Chinese.

== Awards ==
List of accolades received by Jessie Andrews
Awards and nominations
Award	Won	Nominated
AVN Awards	1	11
XBIZ Awards	3	11
XRCO Awards	2	4
- Total number of wins and nominations
Totals	6	26

Year	Award	Category	Work
2012	XBIZ Award	New Starlet of the Year	—N/a
2012	XBIZ Award	Acting Performance of the Year	Portrait of a Call Girl
2012	AVN Award	Best Actress	Portrait of a Call Girl
2012	XRCO Award	Best Actress	Portrait of a Call Girl
2012	XRCO Award	Best New Starlet	—N/a
2016	XBIZ Award	Best Sex Scene – All-Girl	Jessie Loves Girls
