= Pornography in Italy =

Legislation on pornography in Italy states that it is illegal to distribute pictoral or video pornography to persons under the age of 18.

== Legal status ==
The legal status of pornography itself is disputed in Italy. Technically, all production and distribution of pornography in the country is forbidden per Articles 528, 529, and 725 of the Italian Penal Code, which respectively sanction as felonies "Obscene publications and shows", "Obscene activities and objects", and "Commerce of publications, images or other objects offending public decency". In the 1980s, several courts in Italy enforced these laws, ordering confiscation of pornographic material in their jurisdictions.

A new, more permissive interpretation of the law was introduced in the late 1980s as courts ruled that the Penal Code should be seen as protecting citizens' rights to not be exposed to such materials if and when they do not wish to be. Thus, pornography was not to be considered illegal per se, unless someone were to expose such materials to another against the latter's own will.

Providing or exposing pornography to minors under the age of 18 remains strictly forbidden. Other forbidden porn material includes child porn and Snuff porn; contrary to common belief, BDSM and fetishism are not illegal, although other types of acts such as necrophilia are. Most of these extreme practices, though, take place in horror films, which are not covered by statute, rather than strictly pornographic fare.

The legal status of bestiality is unclear.

Despite the recent trend toward legalization of porn, distribution of pornographic video materials is almost totally restricted to the home video market. Relevant laws #23 of 6 August 1990 and #203 of 30 May 1995 forbid the broadcast of hardcore pornography on free-to-air television channels, while such is legal on scrambled channels including digital terrestrial television and satellite television.

Access to these channels and networks, many of which are pay-per-view, requires a subscription and an IRD, which normally features a parental control function to restrict access to given channels. It remains legal to broadcast erotic/softcore movies, videos and infomercials on unencrypted TV channels from 11 p.m. to 7 a.m.

By law, the seller is required to ask for proof of age if he suspects the buyer to be under the legal age for purchasing pornography. This restriction does not apply to softcore magazines.

Pornographic material depicting actors under the age of 18 is classified as child pornography, and is strictly forbidden. Minors cannot give legal consent to appear in pornographic productions of any kind, although the age of consent in Italy varies from 14 to 16 years. Revenge porn was made illegal in 2019.
