= Sunny Side Up Tropical Festival =

- Genre: Pop; rock; EDM; hip hop; indie
- Dates: Consecutive weekends in August
- Locations: Potato Head Beach Club, Seminyak, Bali, Indonesia (2014-18); Manarai Beach House, Nusa Dua, Bali, Indonesia (2019)
- Years active: 2014–2019
- Founders: Ismaya Live
- Website: www.sunnysideupfest.com

Sunny Side Up Tropical Festival is an annual summer music festival in Bali, Indonesia. The first edition was held on August 20, 2014, and it has since been held at Potato Head Beach Club. It is presented by PTT Family and Ismaya Live.

== 2014 ==
The first edition of Sunny Side Up Tropical Festival took place on August 20, 2014, at Potato Head Beach Club, Bali.

Line-ups

- Ellie Goulding
- Azealia Banks
- Banks
- Goldroom (DJ set)
- Jessie Andrews
- RAC (DJ set)
- Stevie G
- Lady Flic

== 2015 ==
The second edition of Sunny Side Up Fest was held on August 7, 2015.

Line-up

Main Stage

Dipha Barus
01:35
Madeon
00:20
Flight Facilities
23:05
Lady Flic
22:35
Kimbra
21:50
Holy Ghost! (DJ set)
20:20
Cyril Hahn
18:55
Jessie Ware
17:45
Motez (producer)
16:20
Lady Flic
15:20
Jonny Nash
14:00

== 2016 ==
The third edition of Sunny Side Up Fest was held in two days, August 13 and 14, 2016.

Line-up

=== August 13, 2016 ===
Main Stage

Mark Ronson (DJ set)
23:00 - 00:30
Blonde
21:20 - 22:50
Breakbot (Live)
19:55 - 21:20
Ta-ku (DJ set)
18:25 - 19:25
Kimokal
17:10 - 17:55
Dipha Barus
16:00 - 17:00
Matty Wainwright
15:00 - 16:00
Phat Phil Cooper
14:00 - 15:00

=== August 14, 2016 ===
Main Stage

Disclosure (DJ set)
23:00 - 00:30
Hermitude
21:20 - 22:20
Sam Feldt
19:30 - 20:50
George Maple
18:30 - 19:20
Stars & Rabbit
17:10 - 18:10
Stevie G
16:00 - 17:00
Adrian Giordano
15:00 - 16:00
Stuart McLellen
14:00 - 15:00

== 2017 ==
The 2017 edition of Sunny Side Up Festival was held in two days, August 11 and 12, 2017.

Line-up

- Phoenix
- Big Sean
- Autograf
- Charli XCX
- Hot Chip (DJ set)
- Jonas Blue
- Snakehips
- Tokimonsta
- TroyBoi
- Wave Racer

== 2018 ==
The 2018 edition was set to be held on two separate occasions on July 21 and August 12. But, it was announced that the second date was cancelled amid Lombok earthquake tragedy.

Line-up

July 21

- Nick Murphy
- Moon Boots
- Basenji
- HMGNC
- Seabass
- Dea
- Stu McLellan
- Khafira

~~August 12~~

- ~~Halsey~~
- ~~Niki~~

== 2019 ==
The 2019 edition was held on August 24. The venue was moved to Manarai Beach House.

Line-up

- Flume
- Grace Carter
- Tokimonsta
- Yahtzel
- Kai (Tantra)
