= Omar Galanti =

Italian pornographic film actor (born 1973)

- Born: 19 September 1973 (age 52); Gattinara, Vercelli, Piedmont, Italy
- Other name: Omar Galanti
- Height: 186 cm (6 ft 1 in)
- Spouse: Marcela Quinonez

Vittorio Paggio (born 19 September 1973), known by the stage name Omar Galanti, is an Italian pornographic actor.

== Biography ==
Galanti began his career as a porn actor in 1997 and to date has starred in about 500 porn productions. In 2010, he signed as exclusive contract as director with Evil Angel's Buttman Magazine Choice niche.

Omar Galanti started his career in low budget pornographic productions in Carmagnola (TO) in 1997.

All productions were impressed by his attitude and his professionalism. He started to be very requested from different directors and finally he was also noticed by Rocco Siffredi.

He started to cooperate constantly with Rocco Siffredi in 2006, appearing in most movies of the most famous Italian actor and director for the next 4 years.

Despite this, his career was full of ups and downs until he signed an exclusive contract as director with Evil Angel's Buttman Magazine Choice niche in 2010. He released several movies until 2017 when, after a controversial disagreement with all the adult industry in Hungary and USA, he decided to retire from the adult industry.

He is actually living in Trino, Italy and running a bike shop, cultivating his passion for mountain bike and cycling.

Galanti has appeared on TV programs such as Le Iene and Lucignolo. In 2008, he was a contestant in the FX reality show Ciak si giri.

== Filmography ==
- Muschio selvaggio - 2020, Directed by Luis Sal & Fedez
- Belle streghe in calore - 2011, Directed by Marco Nero
- Casting all'italiana - 2010–present, Directed by Roby Bianchi

== Palmares ==
- 2006 Ninfa Prize nominee - Best Supporting Actor - Those fucking nuts
- 2007 AVN Award nominee - Male Foreign Performer of the Year
- 2008 AVN Award winner – Best Sex Scene in a Foreign-Shot Production - Furious Fuckers Final Race
- 2008 AVN Award nominee - Male Foreign Performer of the Year
- 2009 AVN Award nominee - Male Foreign Performer Of The Year
- 2009 Hot d'Or nominee - Best European Actor - Dans Règlements De Comptes
- 2010 AVN Award nominee - Male Foreign Performer of the Year
- 2011 AVN Award nominee - Male Foreign Performer of the Year
- 2011 AVN Award nominee - Best Director – Foreign Non-Feature - Omar's Russian Impact!
- 2012 AVN Award nominee - Male Foreign Performer of the Year
- 2013 XBIZ Award nominee - Male Foreign Performer of the Year
- 2023 AVN Award nominee - Male Foreign Performer of the Year
