= Portrait of a Call Girl =

2011 American pornographic film

- Directed by: Graham Travis
- Written by: Graham Travis
- Starring: Jessie Andrews; Zoe Holloway; Darla Crane; Mick Blue; Manuel Ferrara; Alex Gonz; Alec Knight; Danny Mountain; Ramon Nomar; Bill Bailey; Eric Swiss; Jay Crew; Eric John
- Cinematography: Mason; Carlos Dee; Alex Ladd
- Edited by: Graham Travis
- Music by: Bruce Carter
- Production company: Elegant Angel
- Distributed by: Elegant Angel
- Release date: August 26, 2011
- Running time: 148 minutes
- Country: United States
- Language: English

Portrait of a Call Girl is a 2011 American pornographic film starring Jessie Andrews, and directed and written by Graham Travis. In 2012, the film received 19 nominations for both creative and technical awards, winning four AVN Awards for best actress, best director, best feature and the AVN's first Movie of the Year award; one XRCO Award for best epic; and six XBIZ Awards for acting performance of the year – female, best cinematography, best non-sex acting performance of the year, director of the year – individual project, and feature movie of the year.

== Release ==
The film was released as a two-DVD set on August 26, 2011. The first DVD included several special features including a behind-the-scenes featurette, slide show, outtakes, a bonus scene promo teaser and interviews. The second DVD offered a 79:29-minute feature only version, minus any hardcore scenes.

== Reception ==
Critical reviews of Portrait of a Call Girl were mostly favorable, with others acknowledging disappointments. The film received recognition and nominations for editing, art direction, and cinematography. The XBIX Awards honored Mason, Carlos Dee and Alex Ladd with the nod for cinematography, with Travis being honored by both XBIZ and the AVN Awards for Director of the Year for Individual Project and Feature Film, respectively.

Online reviewers Sean DPS and Don Houston of XCritic.com both give the project the site's highest rating of "XCritic Pick" for the Blu-ray and DVD versions of the film. Houston compared the film with selected films touring independent film festivals and director Travis to mainstream director, Steven Soderbergh and his film The Girlfriend Experience. Gram Ponante of fleshbot.com describes the project as a "mainstream film that happens to have sex in it".

Sex and the 405 agreed with Ponante's assessment that the film is "thoughtfully acted, beautifully shot, and sparsely, elegantly orchestrated", yet faulting the script for "tired cliches" including childhood sexual abuse, self-loathing, self-destruction through involvement in the sex industry, and subconsciously crying out for a savior. Sex and the 405 expressed criticism of the fact that professionals from the adult film industry, which operated on the legal side of the fence, would present a film focusing on the illegal branch of the sex industry, the film industry's "marginalized twin". The web site summarized their review stating, "If [the film] didn't perpetuate so many stereotypes about prostitution, we'd be tempted to thank the studio for keeping it real — ish. But its problems are a little too big to ignore."

=== Awards and nominations ===
Ceremony	Category	Recipient	Result
AVN Awards	Best actress	Jessie Andrews	Won
AVN Awards	Best director – feature	Graham Travis	Won
AVN Awards	Best feature	—N/a	Won
AVN Awards	Movie of the year	—N/a	Won
AVN Awards	Best boy / girl sex scene	Jessie Andrews and Manuel Ferrara	Nominated
AVN Awards	Best cinematography	Mason, Carlos Dee and Alex Ladd	Nominated
AVN Awards	Best DVD extras	—N/a	Nominated
AVN Awards	Best editing	Graham Travis	Nominated
AVN Awards	Best oral sex scene	Jessie Andrews	Nominated
AVN Awards	Best screenplay	Graham Travis	Nominated
AVN Awards	Best three-way sex scene (G/B/B)	Jessie Andrews, Mick Blue and Ramon Namor	Nominated
XBIZ Awards	Feature movie of the year	—N/a	Won
XBIZ Awards	Director of the year – individual project	Graham Travis	Won
XBIZ Awards	Acting performance of the year – female	Jessie Andrews	Won
XBIZ Awards	Non-sex acting performance of the year	Alec Knight	Won
XBIZ Awards	Non-sex acting performance of the year	Eric Swiss	Nominated
XBIZ Awards	Screenplay of the year	Graham Travis	Won
XBIZ Awards	Best cinematography	Mason, Carlos Dee and Alex Ladd	Won
XBIZ Awards	Best art direction	—N/a	Nominated
XBIZ Awards	Best editing	Graham Travis	Nominated
XRCO Awards	Best epic	—N/a	Won
