= Greg Centauro =

French pornographic film director and actor (1977-2011)

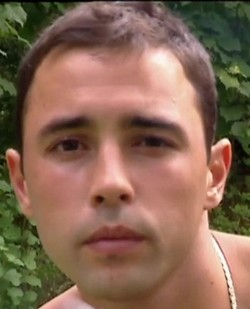
- Centauro in a scene from the 2002 film French Beauty
- Born: Grégory Jean-Claude Giay; January 10, 1977; Marseille, France
- Died: March 26, 2011 (aged 34); Budapest, Hungary
- Other names: Greg Santauro, Greg Centoro, Grec Centauro, Bruno Pelliti, Greg Centaurio, Greg Centaureau, Greg C.
- Height: 5 ft 7.3 in (1.71 m)

Greg Centauro (January 10, 1977 – March 26, 2011) was a French pornographic actor and director.

== Career ==
Centauro came to notoriety in France during the early 2000s when he and his then-girlfriend Clara Morgane became porn actors at the same time. Morgane, who performed most of her heterosexual scenes with Centauro, quickly became France's most popular adult actress. However, she retired from porn after two years, and Centauro wished to continue his career. The two eventually separated. Centauro continued to perform in porn films in France, where he also started directing. He later moved to Budapest, the porn capital of Europe, where he became specialized in gonzo pornography. He was the in-house producer for Paradise Film Entertainment.

== Death ==
Centauro died in Budapest of a cocaine overdose on March 26, 2011, while he was in the shooting phase of Nut, Butts and Euro Sluts 2.

== Personal life ==
Centauro was married to Hungarian glamour model and pornographic actress Vera Versanyi from 2005 to 2011. Centauro was a dedicated fan of the German rock outfit Rammstein.

== Partial filmography ==
- Anal History
- Fucking Beautiful 7
- Nuts, Butts, Euro Sluts
- Pretty Chicks
- Das Edelmodel
- Sex Maniac Bitches

== Film labels ==
- Paradise Film Entertainment
- Digital Sin
- Platinum X Pictures
- Zero Tolerance

== Awards and nominations ==
- 2007 eLine Award, winner - Best International Series - Ass Drippers (Paradise Film)
- 2007 eLine Award, winner - Best International Actor
- 2008 eLine Award, winner - Best German Actor
- 2009 Erotixxx Award, winner - Best German Film - Black and White 4 U (Paradise Film)
