= Ramón Nomar =

Venezuelan-born Spanish pornographic actor and director (born 1974)

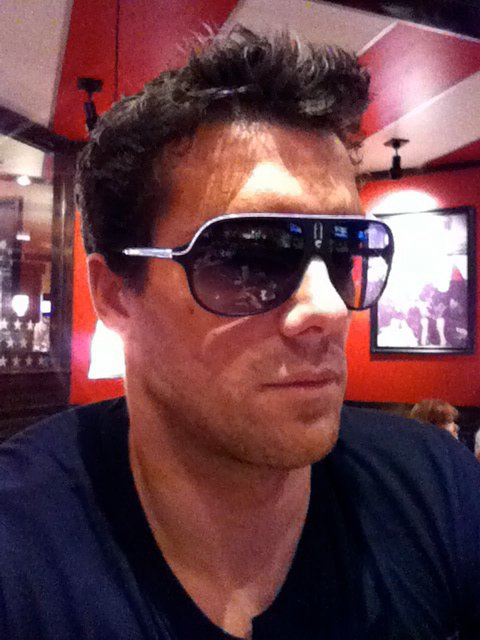
- Nomar in 2011
- Born: 9 January 1974 (age 52); Caracas, Venezuela
- Other name: Todd
- Years active: 1995–present
- Height: 1.88 m (6 ft 2 in)

Ramón Nomar (born 9 January 1974) is a Venezuelan pornographic actor and director. His accolades include the Hot d'Or Award for Best New Actor and the XBIZ Award for Male Performer of the Year. Nomar broke into the pornographic film industry after being discovered by Italian director Luca Damiano at a casting contest. He has worked with pornographic film producers Reality Kings, Brazzers and New Sensation.

Nomar eventually broke into both the European and U.S. industries. He is one of the most popular actors in the porn industry. He has stated in the past that he had always been in favor of well-scripted features as opposed to gonzo pornography, although he had no objections to appearing in films of either style.

== Early life ==
Nomar was born in Caracas, Venezuela, but grew up in A Coruña, Spain. He built his first bicycle himself, searching for parts in various junkyards. At 16, he expressed a desire to perform in pornographic films after developing a fascination with Rocco Siffredi's films. He also became passionate about water sports such as surfing and spearfishing, used his additional funding for surf training, and participated in surfing competitions.

Nomar recalls being restless in school, often getting into trouble and showing a reluctance to learn. After quitting school, he started working in the events department of A Coruña, where he hung posters on the street. He also worked as a waiter. He completed the nine-month service in the Navy in the Canary Islands. In 1994, at the age of 20, he started working in a local sex shop, where, in addition to running the store, he also ran a peep show for a year.

== Career ==
=== Beginnings ===
In September 1995, Nomar traveled to the International Erotic Film Festival in Barcelona, where he participated in and won a casting contest organized by Italian director Luca Damiano. As a participant, Nomar engaged in sexual intercourse with a woman on a Poble Espanyol stage in front of about 2,000 spectators. Two weeks later, he filmed his first erotic film with Damiano: Cindy with Selen.

Early in his career, Nomar was credited under his given name "Ramón" or "Guevara". He played Guanche in the José María Ponce production Showgirls in Madrid (1996). Nomar became a frequent collaborator with Damiano, appearing in several of his high-budget productions. In 1997, he starred as John the Baptist in an erotic pastiche of Oscar Wilde's tragedy Salomé and appeared as a police officer in Fucking Instinct. The following year, he portrayed General Barras in Napoleone and appeared in erotic parodies of The Night Porter and Anastasia. He also played Frank in a parody of the 1960s Western The Magnificent Seven: Rocco and the Magnific Seven (1998) and 1954's Seven Samurai: Rocco and the Mercenaries (1999) with Rocco Siffredi. During this time, Nomar also performed in erotic shows at the Baghdad Party Hall in Barcelona.

=== Rise to prominence in Europe ===
In 1998, Nomar received the Hot d'Or award for Best Newcomer at the Cannes Erotic Film Festival. The following year, he returned to Cannes to present a Lifetime Achievement Award to Larry Flynt, founder of Hustler. He participated in photo shoots, often with Andrea Moranty and Toni Ribas. He also appeared in the movies: Anita Dark Forever (1999) with Anita Dark, Gothix (2000) with Chipy Marlow and Nosferatu (2002) with Melinda Gale. Narcís Bosch hired him to produce IFGs such as Lágrimas de esperma (2001), Sex Meat (2001), Mundo salvaje de Max (2001), Ruta 69 (2001), Kryminalne tango (Crazy Bullets, 2003), Hot Rats (2003), Café diablo (2006) and El escándalo de la princesa del pueblo (2011).

Nomar continued to work with Evil Angel, appearing in several productions: Rocco Siffredi's Rocco Never Dies – The End (1998), Christoph Clark's Christoph's Beautiful Girls 4 (2002), Euro Angels Hardball 17: Anal Savants, Beautiful Girls 4 (2002) and Euro Angels Hardball 17: Anal Savants (2002). He also began performing in BDSM scenes for Kink.com involving submission, deep throat, rimming, female ejaculation, anal and vaginal fisting, gang bang, bukkake, spitting and slapping.

On two occasions, Nomar received the Ninfa Award for Best Spanish Actor at the Barcelona International Erotic Film Festival. The first win was in 2004 for playing a wrestler in 616 DF: El diablo español vs. Las luchadoras del este. The second was in 2006 for playing a forest ranger in Mantis: O Bosque do Tesão. After appearing alongside Mick Blue in the Spanish production of Razorback (The Gift, 2006), he was awarded the statuette of Ninfa for the best Spanish film and the best Spanish screenplay (Roberto Valtueña), he collaborated with studios such as Vidéo Marc Dorcel, Mario Salieri Entertainment Group and Private Media Group.

Nomar participated in the feminist porn film Five Hot Stories for Her (2007), for which the director Erika Lust received an award at the 2005 Barcelona International Erotic Film Festival. In the drama Wasteland (2012) he appeared on the club scene.

From 1 to 4 October 2015 he participated in an erotic salon in Barcelona with artists such as Nacho Vidal, Steve Holmes, Erica Fontes, Tiffany Doll, Franceska Jaimes and Carolina Abril. In June 2018 he won the ranking of the Spanish website 20minutos.es Guapo (letra R), beating men such as Rubén Cortada, Ryan Reynolds, Ryan Kelley, Ryan Guzman, Ricky Martin and Robert Lewandowski.

From 9 to 11 June 2017 he participated in El Salón Erotic de Madrid (SEMAD) in Madrid together with Silvia Rubí, Amirah Adara, Erica Fontes, Nacho Vidal and Carolina Abril.

On 8 October 2017, at the 25th Barcelona International Erotic Film Festival, Nomar received the award for "Best International Actor Saló Erotic de Barcelona (SEB)" with a T-shirt with the inscription "There is no consent to the sexual abuse of minors"(Abuso sexual infantil: STOP) protesting against pedophilia.

In December 2017 he was ninth in the ranking of "Favorite Porn Actor" (Mis Actores Porno Favoritos), announced by the Spanish portal 20minutos.es.

In May 2019, at the erotic pub The Secret Garden in Medellín, Colombia, Nomar held workshops on the adult film industry, organized by former journalist Amaranta Hank.

=== United States ===
In December 2010, due to the difficult economic situation in Spain, Nomar moved to Los Angeles. He participated in gonzo productions such as Slutty & Sluttier 12 (2010) by Manuel Ferrara or Belladonna: Manhandled 4 (2011) with Belladonna, and also collaborated with American brands such as Wicked Pictures, Reality Kings, New Sensations, Digital Playground, Evil Angel, Brazzers, Hard X, Kink, Porndoe Premium or Elegant Angel.

Due to his Spanish accent, Nomar was cast by director Jordan Septo as Zorro, who was based on historic Californian outlaw Joaquín Murieta, in his film Zorro XXX: A Pleasure Dynasty Parody (2012). The film won the NightMoves Award for Best Parody-Drama.

Joanna Angel cast him for the role of the monster in Burning Angel's Fuckenstein (2012) pastiche, for which he was nominated for an AVN Award in the category "Best Double Penetration Sex Scene" with James Deen and Joanna Angel. The film received the Industry AltPorn Award in the "Best Feature Video" category. He also acted as the neighbor in Masashi Kishimoto's Naruto shōnen manga parody, Comic Book Freaks and Cosplay Geeks (2015), directed by Joanna Angel with Annie Cruz and Wolf Hudson. Nomar also played a clergyman in The Crucible: Parody Gangbang (2016), a parody of Arthur Miller's play directed by Maitresse Madeline Marlowe.

On 23 January 2016, he received nine AVN Awards nominations, including Favorite Pornstar and Male Performer of the Year. He was named sixth on Adult Entertainment Broadcast Network's "Pornstars 2017" list, eighth on AEBN's "Summer 2019 Pornstars", and entered the "Golden Three" on AEBN's "2020 Pornstars" list. Nomar was one of the stars of Evil & Hot Halloween Orgy (2017), which was nominated for the AltPorn Award for Best Gonzo Video. He also appeared in several Axel Braun porn parodies: Deadpool (2018) as Punisher, Captain Marvel (2019) as Chrell and Black Widow (2021) as Taskmaster. In Joanna Angel's Evil Tiki Babes (2020), which won the AVN Award for best screenplay, he played a bartender.

In 2020, Nomar started releasing his content on the subscription platform OnlyFans, gaining a large number of subscribers. He starred alongside Rebel Lynn in the production of A Little R&R with Rebel & Ramon (2021). On 15 January 2021, he was honored with the XBIZ Award for Male Performer of the Year. In 2021, he performed in his first transgender scene for the Evil Angel production Aubrey Kate Is Ramon Nomar's First TS, which he co-directed with Chris Streams. That same year, he made his solo directorial debut for Evil Angel's TransInternational: Los Angeles with Wolf Hudson and Joanna Angel. He also directed TransInternational: Las Vegas.

== Other works ==
Nomar completed an acting course at the Stella Adler School in Los Angeles. His photos appeared in the American women's magazine Playgirl, in August 1999 for Suze Randall and in November 2000.

On 2 March 2015, at The Hollywood Roosevelt Hotel on Hollywood Boulevard, Hollywood, he was the star during the promotion of Patricia Velásquez's autobiographical book Straight Walk: A Supermodel's Journey To Finding Her Truth. On 11 October 2016, Emily Witt's book Future Sex was published, in which he is also mentioned.

In the comedy Original Sin (2018) he acted as a news reporter.

== Awards ==
- 1998 Hot d'Or Award – Best New Actor
- 2004 Ninfa Prize – Best Spanish Actor (616DF – El Diablo español vs las luchadoras del este)
- 2006 Ninfa Prize – Best Spanish Actor (Mantis)
- 2012 AVN Award – Best Group Sex Scene (Asa Akira Is Insatiable 2) with Asa Akira, Erik Everhard, Toni Ribas, Danny Mountain, Jon Jon, Broc Adams & John Strong
- 2013 AVN Award – Best Double Penetration Sex Scene (Asa Akira Is Insatiable 3) with Asa Akira & Mick Blue
- 2013 AVN Award – Best Group Sex Scene (Asa Akira Is Insatiable 3) with Asa Akira, Erik Everhard & Mick Blue
- 2013 AVN Award – Best Three-Way Sex Scene (B/B/G) (Lexi) with Lexi Belle and Mick Blue
- 2013 XBIZ Award – Best Scene – Feature Movie (Wasteland)
- 2014 AVN Award – Best Three-Way Sex Scene (B/B/G) (Anikka) with Anikka Albrite and James Deen
- 2015 AVN Award – Best Group Sex Scene (Gangbang Me) with A.J. Applegate, John Strong, Erik Everhard, Mr. Pete, Mick Blue, James Deen and Jon Jon
- 2015 AVN Award – Best Three-Way Sex Scene (B/B/G) (Allie) with Allie Haze and Mick Blue
- 2019 AltPorn Award – Best Feature AltPorn Video (Leigh Raven: Prove Something)
- 2019 AVN Award – Best Boy/Girl Sex Scene (The Possession of Mrs. Hyde)
- 2019 NightMoves Award – Best Male Performer (Editor's Choice)
- 2020 AVN Award – Best Anal Sex Scene (Emily Willis: The Anal Awakening)
- 2020 AVN Award – Best Double-Penetration Sex Scene (I Am Riley)
- 2020 AVN Award – Best Foreign-Shot Anal Sex Scene (Elements)
- 2021 XBIZ Award – Male Performer of the Year
- 2022 XBIZ Award – Best Sex Scene – Feature Movie
