= Gessa =

Gessa is a surname. Notable people with the surname include:

- Andrea Gessa (born 1980), Italian footballer
- Cecilia Gessa (born 1977), Spanish actress
- Gian Luigi Gessa (born 1932), Italian neuroscientist

== See also ==
- Sebastián Gessa y Arias, great-grandfather of Cecilia
