= GoreX =

- Film poster
- Directed by: Ángel Mora
- Written by: Ángel Mora
- Starring: Candela; Nacho Vidal; Sophie Evans; Toni Ribas; Denise; Max Cortés
- Cinematography: Albert Serradó
- Edited by: Ángel Mora
- Music by: Mandrágora
- Production company: NTC S.R.L.
- Distributed by: Canal X
- Release date: 1997
- Running time: 84 minutes (hardcore); 72 minutes (softcore)
- Country: Spain
- Language: Spanish

GoreX (also known as GoreX: The Zombi Horror Picture Show) is a 1997 Spanish pornographic comedy horror film written and directed by Ángel Mora, produced by NTC S.R.L., and distributed by Canal X. A zombie film, it follows a mad scientist's twisted experiments with a drug that turns people into hypersexual zombies and stars Candela, Nacho Vidal, Sophie Evans, Toni Ribas, Denise, and Max Cortés.

== Plot ==
In 1988, a hiker named Raimi finds a headless corpse in the woods and is knocked out, awakening later, bound and gagged, in the private laboratory of Professor Quentin Foster. Foster monologues to a camera about how he has invented a new drug, Goresmina, that eliminates pain, before injecting the serum into Raimi. Foster tortures and mutilates Raimi in various ways before shooting him and declaring, "The experiment did not go as expected." Foster afterward notices that Raimi's body has an erection, which inspires him to continue fine-tuning Goresmina.

Two years later, three young women, Laura, Lina, and Romay, experience car trouble, and, while searching for aid, stumble upon Foster and his two assistants, Jess and Franco. Foster invites the women to stay the night in his home and has Jess and Franco dispose of the telephones and the women's car while he has drinks with Laura, a medical student who is a fan of Foster. Foster rants about how humanity is on a path to self-destruction due to low libido and increased impotence and brings up his recent work in sexual science as he spikes the drink he gives Laura. The drugged Laura dreams about having sex with Jess, and Franco secretly gives Goresmina to Lina and Romay. When Laura awakens, Foster has her watch through a monitor as Lina has sex with Franco, whose genitals are eventually ripped off and eaten by a zombified Lina. Franco is mercy-killed by being shot by Jess, while Foster, unable to cope with his inability to perfect Goresmina, commits suicide by shooting himself in the mouth in front of Laura.

Romay turns into a zombie while masturbating and kills a pair of burglars named Fulci and Savini after seducing and having sex with Fulci. Jess, with Laura in tow, uses a shotgun to kill Lina, Romay, and three other test subjects (Foster's cousins) kept locked in the basement by Foster. Afterward, Laura and Jess become a couple, though it turns out Laura is secretly continuing Foster's work, stealthily giving doses of Goresmina to Jess.

== Cast ==
- Candela as Laura
- Nacho Vidal as Jess
- Denise as Lina
- Max Cortés as Franco
- Sophie Evans as Romay
- Toni Ribas as Fulci
- Emilio Lisbona as Savini
- Xavier Canals as Professor Quentin Foster
- Antonio Marcos as Zombie 1
- Mayte Pradas as Zombie 2
- Joan Manau as Zombie 3
- Javier López Perea as Raimi

== Production ==
The idea for GoreX came from Antonio Marcos, a producer at Canal X, who, after overhearing Ángel Mora, an aspiring filmmaker who he shared an office with in Barcelona, mention his love of gore films, suggested that Mora "shoot the first gore porn film." According to Mora, while he got along with the film's actors, he did not socialize with them, stating, "I didn't go out for drinks with them mainly because they were pretty one-track-minded: sex, sex, and more sex. You couldn't talk to them about anything else." GoreX was originally set to star Maria de Sanchez, who would go on to appear in Mora's 2004 film Kannibal: Me gusta la sangre.

== Release ==
GoreX did not perform as well as expected at the box office, so director Ángel Mora worked with distributor Javier Perea to reedit GoreX into a softcore sex film with more gore scenes for the 1998 VHS release by Perea's company Imagen D.E.A.T.H. GoreX ended up being banned in Germany, Belgium, and the United States.

== Reception ==
AdultDVDTalk gave GoreX an overall score of 2/4 and concluded, "All in all, I think that a more experienced adult movie maker could do a great job with the ideas presented here, especially if Ángel Mora was brought in to oversee the gore scenes. However, as presented here, GoreX comes across as a jumbled incomplete film which will ultimately frustrate viewers." Horror Online gave GoreX a grade of 1/10 and wrote, "The level of production is amateurish in every way: direction, script, acting, effects and shots. Perhaps it was supposed to be a pastiche or a postmodern mishmash and a tribute to the creators of cult films, but it turned out to be a complete failure."
