= Toni Ribas =

Spanish pornographic actor and director (born 1975)

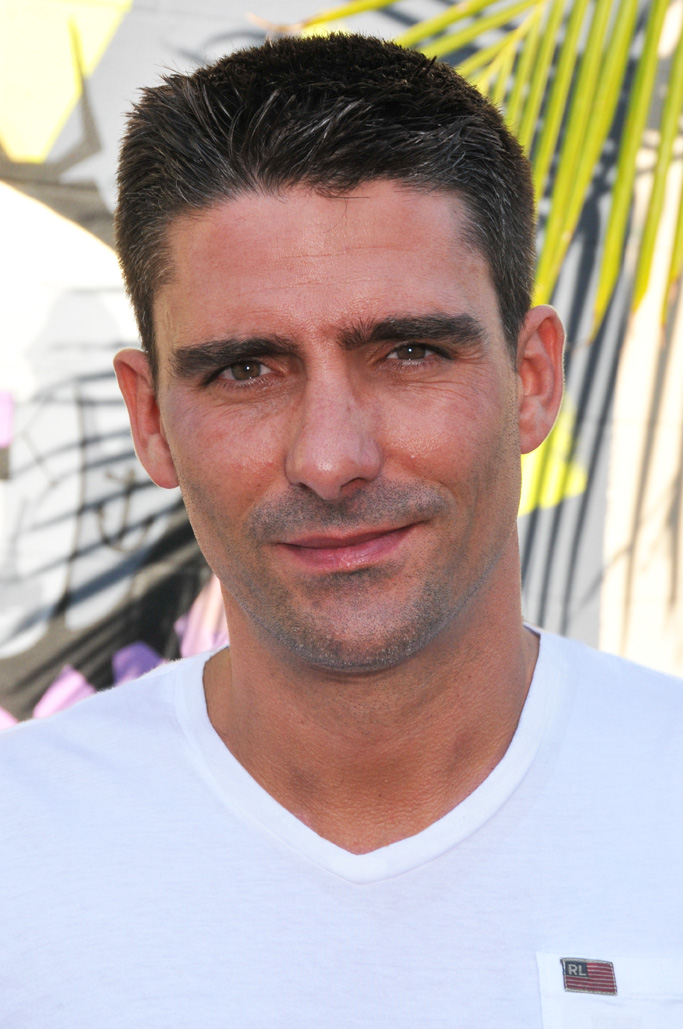
- Ribas in 2013
- Born: Antoni García Cabra; 13 June 1975 (age 51); Sant Boi de Llobregat, Barcelona, Spain
- Occupation: Pornographic actor
- Years active: 1994–present
- Spouses: Sophie Evans (divorced); Asa Akira (m. 2012; div. 2017); Kayla Kayden (m. 2020)

Toni Ribas (born Antoni García Cabra; 13 June 1975) is a Spanish pornographic actor and director. In 2010, he was inducted into the AVN Hall of Fame.

Ribas began acting in pornography in 1994. Ribas worked for Brazzers and performed in 78 videos as of 2 November 2018. He performed in about 1,300 videos in his pornographic career.

== Early life ==
Ribas was born in Sant Boi de Llobregat, in the Province of Barcelona, Spain. At 13, he was hyperactive, had boundless energy and a tendency to get into trouble. He belonged to the Unió Esportiva Santboiana rugby club. He was also dedicated to helping his father with maintenance services such as injection molds and special tools. During his studies at the Bachillerato Unificado Polivalente (BUP) in Sant Boi in Barcelona, he earned extra money selling calculators. Some time later, he completed his military service.

== Career ==
In 1994, at the age of 19, Ribas saw an ad in the newspaper Segunda Mano about working for actors in pornographic productions and he entered the casting. At the audition, he was selected to be part of the cast of Venganza sexual, directed by José María Ponce, who hired Ribas in the Spanish-language video production of Club Privado, which premiered on TV on 1 December 1995.

For three years, Ribas worked at the Sala de Fiestas Bagdad porn club in Barcelona, where he met Nacho Vidal and his then-girlfriend Jazmine.

In 1996, in Madrid, Ribas played Toni Navarro in the International Film Group (IFG) film Showgirls, directed by José María Ponce and alongside actors Nina Hartley, Hakan Belkiran, Max Cortés and Ramón Nomar.

Riccardo Billi and Luca Damiano cast Ribas in the role of a Roman soldier in the International Film Group (IFG) Spanish-Italian co-production of contemporary porn Salomé (1997), a pastiche of the Oscar Wilde tragedy Salomé, also starring Leslie, Roberto Malone (Herod), Ramón Nomar (John the Baptist), Nacho Vidal (Roman soldier) and Remigio Zampa (Tigelino).

In 1997, Ribas met the American porn director Andrew Blake at the club and shortly after this meeting Ribas went to Paris to work with him. Ribas worked behind the camera with Blake as assistant director.

In 1998 in Spain, Ribas attended a film course to learn the basics. He was a photographer in Prague and Budapest.

After appearing in Amanda's Diary 4 (1999), Ribas came to the United States for the first time.

In 2000, Ribas made his directorial debut with the group Elegant Angel and filmed Hardcore Innocence 1 (2001), continuing the series until Hardcore Innocence 9 (2003–2007). He has also worked with some of the biggest studios including Cineplex, Red Light District and Jules Jordan. He became an expert in gonzo production.

In 2001, for his performance in Gothix (2000), directed by José María Ponce, Ribas was nominated for an award at the Barcelona International Erotic Film Festival in the "Best Spanish Actor" category. In 2002, two films in which Ribas participated were awarded the Ninfa Award. The first film was a full-length porn parody of Gladiator: Private Gold 54: Gladiator 1 (2002), directed by Antonio Adamo and starring Steve Holmes (Senator Falcus), Rita Faltoyano (Domitilla), Mandy Bright (Syria), Frank Gun (Commodus), Karl Ben (Jailer) and David Perry (Marcus). That film won the award in the "Cinematic Value" category, and Toni Ribas as the main lead in Maxximus was nominated in the "Best Spanish Actor" category. The second film awarded in the "Best Spanish Film" category was a pornographic version of Goethe's drama Faust: Private Black Label 26: Faust Power of Sex (2000), directed by José María Ponce, in which Ribas was Faust, and starred Nacho Vidal (in the role of Mephisto), Belladonna (Walpurga), Rita Faltoyano (slave) and Max Cortés (devil).

In 2003, Ribas was nominated for an Adult Video News Award in four categories: "Best Foreign Actor of the Year", "Best Actor" in Private Gold 54: Gladiator 1 (2002), "Best Director of a Foreign Production" Exxxplosion (2002) and "Best Sex Scene in a Foreign Production" in Exxxplosion (2002) with Monica Belvedere, Nick Lang and Rita Faltoyano.

In 2006, Ribas was nominated for the Ninfa Award in the "Most Original Sex Scene" category in Private Gold 79: Sex Angels 2 (2006), directed by Xavi Domínguez and alongside Sonia Baba.

On 20 December 2008, Ribas won the ranking of "Top 5 most attractive porn actors" according to the Spanish portal Nosotras.

In 2009, Ribas was nominated for the AVN Award in two categories: "Best Foreign Performer of the Year" and "Best Trio Sex Scene - Girl/Boy/Boy" in Slave Dolls 3 (2008), directed by Mason along with the actors Jandi Lin and Mr. Pete.

On 5 January 2010 Private premiered the film The Private Life of Toni Ribas.

In 2010, Ribas received the AVN Award for "Best Foreign Performer of the Year" and he was inducted into the AVN Hall of Fame and earned three nominations in the categories: "Best Group Sex Scene" in Rocco Ravishes LA (2009) alongside Jamie Elle, Rocco Siffredi and Bobbi Starr; "Best Double Penetration Sex Scene" in Jenna Haze: Nymphomaniac (2009) opposite Jenna Haze and Mr. Pete; and "Best Group Sex Scene" in Evil Anal 10 (2009) opposite Andi Anderson, Michael Stefano, Adrianna Nicole, Madison Parker, and Bobbi Starr.

In 2016, Ribas was nominated for the AVN Award in the "Best Actor" category and participated in a photo shoot with Terry Richardson.

In December 2017, Ribas took sixth place in the "Favorite Porn Actor" ranking (My Favorite Porn Actors), announced by the Spanish portal 20minutos.es.

In 2018, for the production of Evil Angel Stepdad Seduction 3 (2017), Ribas was nominated for XBiz Awards in two categories: "Best Taboo Performance" and "Best Taboo Sex Scene" with Gina Valentina. He also earned two 2018 Inked Awards nominations in the "Sex Scene" category in Evil Squirters 3 (2017) with Riley Reid and Darker Side of Desire 2 (2018) with Katrina Jade. In 2019, he was nominated for the XBiz Awards for his production of Stepdad Seduction 4 (2018) in the "Best Taboo Sex Scene" category with Carolina Sweets. Ribas was ranked 6th and was the first European in the Top 30 Hottest and Best Pornstars of 2019.

== Personal life ==
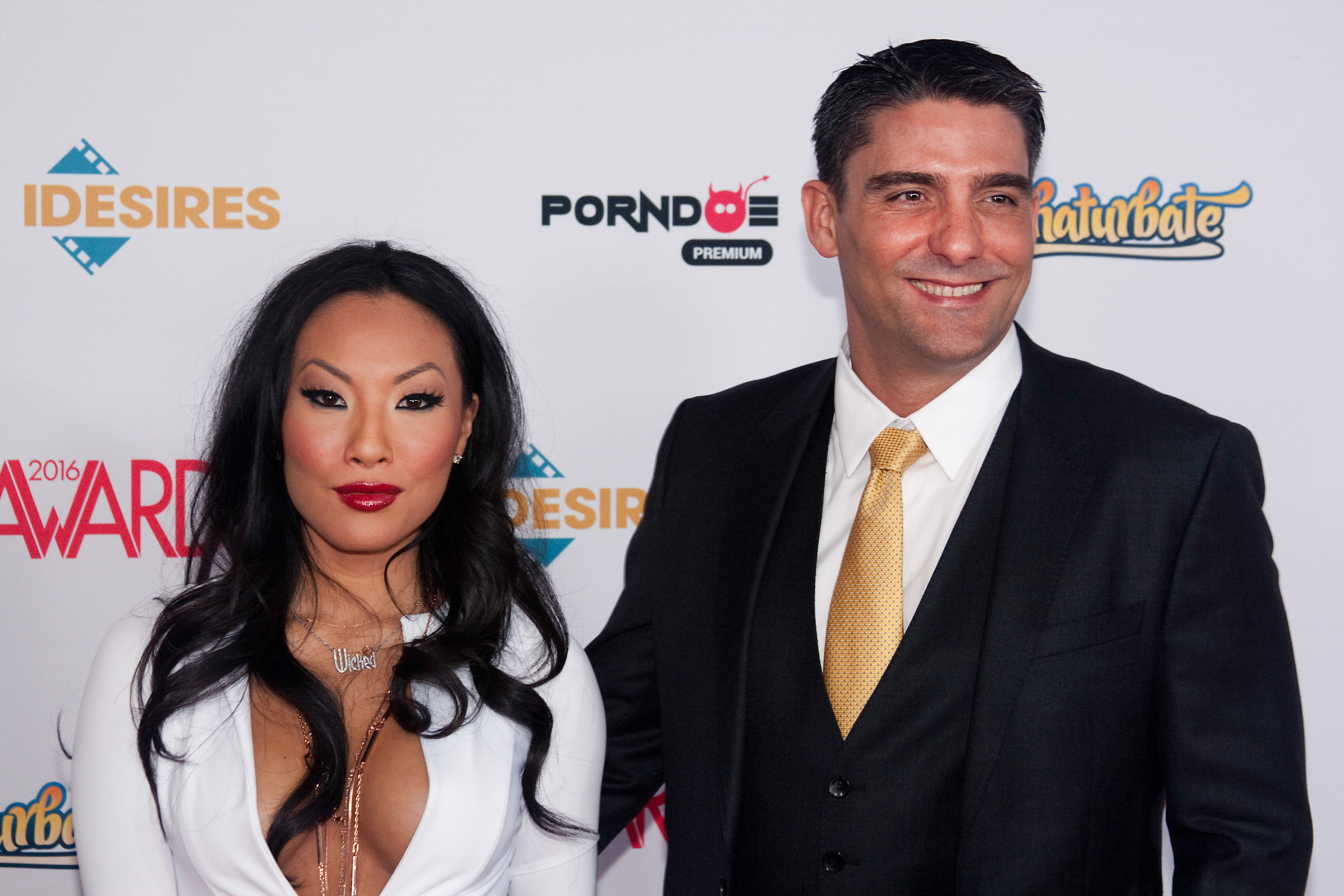
Ribas with Asa Akira in 2016 AVN Awards

Toni Ribas has been married three times. Firstly in 1998, he married pornographic actress Sophie Evans in Cornellà de Llobregat, who he appeared in several films, including Pirate Deluxe 15: Eternal Ecstasy (2001), Best By Private 26: Heaven on Earth (2001) and the pornographic trilogy Private Gladiator. However, he divorced Evans in mid-2005. They were married for 10 years.

In 2012, Ribas moved to Los Angeles, California. In December 2012, he married pornographic actress Asa Akira. They divorced in 2017.

When Carles Puigdemont assumed the presidency of the Catalan government on 12 January 2016 the Catalan writer Quim Monzó asked Toni Ribas, who was then working in Los Angeles, on Twitter to say Puigdemont's name in the film scene, to which he agreed.

In 2020 he married pornographic actress Kayla Kayden.

== Awards and nominations ==
Toni Ribas awards and nominations
Awards and nominations
| Award | Wins | Nominations |
| AVN Awards | 3 | 6 |
| XBIZ Awards | 2 | 0 |
| Venus Awards | 2 | 0 |
| FICEB Awards | 2 | 4 |

Totals (Note: Certain award groups do not simply award one winner. They acknowledge several different recipients, have runners-up, and have third place. Since this is a specific recognition and is different from losing an award, runner-up mentions are considered wins in this award tally. For simplification and to avoid errors, each award in this list has been presumed to have had a prior nomination.)
- Wins: 9
- Nominations: 10

| Year | Award | Category | Film | Result | Co-actors |
|---|---|---|---|---|---|
| 2001 | FICEB Ninfa Award | Best Actor (Public) | | Won | |
| 2001 | FICEB Ninfa | Best Spanish Actor | Gothix | Nominated | |
| 2001 | FICEB Ninfa | Best Supporting Actor | Secret Paris | Nominated | |
| 2001 | Venus Award | Best Actor (Europe) | | Won | |
| 2002 | Venus Award | Best Actor (Europe) | | Won | |
| 2003 | AVN Award | Male Foreign Performer of the Year | | Nominated | |
| 2003 | AVN Award | Best Director - Foreign Release | Exxxplosion!!! | Nominated | |
| 2003 | AVN Award | Best Actor - Video | The Private Gladiator | Nominated | |
| 2006 | FICEB Ninfa | Most Original Sex Scene | Sex Angels 2 | Nominated | Sonia Baby |
| 2006 | FICEB Ninfa | Spanish Best Actor | Sex Angels 2 | Nominated | |
| 2007 | FICEB Ninfa Award | Best Spanish 100% Sex Film | Ibiza Sex Party | Won | |
| 2009 | AVN Award | Male Foreign Performer of the Year | | Nominated | |
| 2009 | AVN Award | Best Threeway Sex Scene | Slave Dolls 3 | Nominated | |
| 2009 | AVN Award | Best Director - Foreign Non-Feature | My Evil Sluts 2 | Nominated | |
| 2010 | AVN Award | Male Foreign Performer of the Year | | Won | |
| 2010 | AVN Award | AVN Hall of Fame inductee | | Won | |
| 2011 | AVN Award | Best Double Penetration Sex Scene | Asa Akira Is Insatiable | Won | Asa Akira, Erik Everhard |
| 2013 | XBIZ Award | Foreign Male Performer of the Year | | Won | |
| 2013 | XBIZ Award | Best Scene (Feature Movie) | Wasteland | Won | Lily Carter, Lily LaBeau, Mick Blue, Ramón Nomar, David Perry |
