= Holly One =

Italian pornography actor

- Born: Oliviero Migliore; April 12, 1965
- Died: September 8, 2006 (aged 41); Barcelona, Spain
- Other names: Molly One, Holli Esmeralda, Henry the Great, Molli Esmeralda
- Height: 1.20 m (3 ft 11 in)
- Website: http://www.hollyonebcn.com

Holly One (born Oliviero Migliore; April 12, 1965 – September 8, 2006) was an Italian porn star who was foremost known for his short stature (around 120 centimetres (3.9 ft)).

He settled in Spain in the 1980s and started to perform in shows at night clubs in Ibiza in the 1990s. He was discovered by Juani de Lucía, the owner of the Barcelona night club Bagdad, and became a protagonist of erotic spectacles staged at the place. He made his hardcore debut in the movie Pequeño pero Matón in 1997. Until his death, he performed in numerous porn films along with famous actors Rocco Siffredi and Nacho Vidal in scenes with Katsumi (Who Fucked Rocco?), Kelly Stafford (Rocco e Kelly indecenti a Barcelona), and other distinguished (mostly Spanish-based) porn actresses of the period.

His acting credits were not confined to pornography though. He appeared in many mainstream films, among which were All About My Mother and Faust: Love of the Damned.

He was a favorite figure of the Barcelona International Erotic Film Festival through both his stage performances and award nominations there. In 2000, he won a Ninfa Award for Best Supporting Actor for the film Bulls and Milk (Narcís Bosch/International Film Grup).

He died in Barcelona of cardiac arrest caused by lung disease.
