= Sambuca (disambiguation) =

Sambuca is an alcoholic drink.

Sambuca may also refer to:

- Sambuca (siege engine), ancient naval weapon
- Sambuca (instrument), an ancient stringed instrument
- Sambuca or sambuca rotata, a hurdy-gurdy, a hand-cranked stringed musical instrument from the Middle Ages
- Sambuca (song), a song by British garage act Wideboys
- Sambuca di Sicilia, comune in Sicily, Italy
- Sambuca Pistoiese, comune in Tuscany, Italy
- Sambuca Kelly, fictional character in UK TV: see List of Waterloo Road characters
- Sambucus, botanical genus containing the elder and elderberry.
- Katya Sambuca (b. 1991), Russian singer, actress, model and television presenter.
