= Amarna Miller =

Spanish YouTuber (born 1990)

- Miller in 2026
- Born: 29 October 1990 (age 36); Madrid, Spain
- Other name: Marina Manot
- Education: European University of Madrid
- Occupations: Pornographic film actress; vlogger; YouTuber
- Years active: 2010–present
- Website: marinamanot.com

Amarna Miller (born 29 October 1990) is a Spanish YouTuber and former pornographic film actress, producer, director, and writer.

Miller, whose stage name is a combination of the ancient Egyptian archaeological site Amarna and the surname of the American novelist, short story writer and essayist Henry Miller, graduated in fine arts from the European University of Madrid.

== Career ==
Miller joined the adult film industry at 19 years of age, operating her own film production company called Omnia-X for five years. She has appeared in the magazines PlayGround and Primera Línea and on the Orgasmatrix website.

Despite being a supporter of feminist pornography, she acknowledges that she works in "an industry made by and for men" and that "if I only shot feminist porn, I would not pay half a bill." She is an advocate for ethical pornography but states that rights of adult actors are not respected in most jurisdictions outside the United States.

She was featured as spokeswoman and protagonist in a controversial promotional spot for the Erotic Salon of Barcelona 2016. The advertisement, called Patria and awarded a Silver Lion at the Cannes Lions festival, criticizes Spanish double standards and ends with the phrase: "We live in a disgustingly hypocritical country, but some of us do not give up".

In 2016, she was featured in a pornographic music video along with actor Sylvan produced by the Spanish rock and roll group Novedades Carminha entitled "Ritmo En La Sangre". The video was available on their website and XVideos.

In 2017, she starred in her first feature film entitled Contigo no, bicho, directed by Álvaro Alonso and Miguel Ángel Jiménez, which premiered at the Málaga Film Festival. In September of that year, she was injured in a motorcycle accident in Puerto Princesa, Palawan, in the Philippines, sustaining multiple injuries that necessitated surgery and a blood transfusion.

She stopped shooting pornography in 2017 to pursue other opportunities. She has since acknowledged the stigma she faces due to her past sex work.

== Media appearances ==
Miller has taken part, among others, in the television programs Al rincón de pensar (Antena 3), Late Motiv (Movistar+), Sálvame Deluxe (Telecinco), and The Zoo (LATV), while also taking part in the independent radio program Carne Cruda.

She presents the television show Diario Vice on channel 0 of Movistar+ where she interviewed the Spanish artist Abel Azcona and the musical band Las Odio. In 2016 she was interviewed by Buenafuente in Late Motiv. In 2018 she assisted the TV program La Resistencia, presented by David Broncano.

She appeared on the cover of Interviú magazine in 2014 and 2016, as well as Bad Skin, Mongolia and Primera Línea.

In digital media, she has done many interviews such as Erebus, Jot Down and GQ. She is also very active on social media. She uses her YouTube channel to express ideas about sustainability, stigma rupture and ecology. On this channel, Miller tells her experiences like living a month in her van or without producing trash, why she gave up pornography, or what medicines to take when going to a foreign country.

== Literary publications ==
In 2015, she published her first book titled Manual de psiconáutica with the publisher Lapsus Calami (while the prologue was done by Nacho Vigalondo and the epilogue by Luna Miguel) and it was a mix of poetry and photography. She defined it as "my personal labyrinth, my nook, my innermost".

She also wrote the prologue of @Alicia_hot written by Alejandro Ruiz Morillas, the back cover of the book Post Coño written by Gaby Bess (both in 2015) and the prologue of X written by Risto Mejide in 2016.

== Pornography, feminism, diversity, and religion ==
In May 2016, she held a talk with Podemos deputies Beatriz Gimeno and Clara Serra titled "Sex, porn and feminism" in which she argued that pornography cannot be used for sex education; her presence in this talk was not well received by some feminist sectors. She held a talk again with Clara Serra in 2017, this time accompanied by the pornographic actor Aday Traun, at the Charles III University of Madrid titled "Pornography and diversity" in which she criticized some clichés of the pornographic industry.

She has appeared in short films The Immaculate Heart by Vex Ashley and Lacrimarum by Nico Bertrand. On the cover of the magazine Mongolia in March 2016, she posed emulating Mary, mother of Jesus.

== Awards and nominations ==
- TEA Award (2017) - Best Female Performer (winner)
- Ninfa Award (2015, 2016) – Best personal web (winner)
- Ninfa Award (2014) – Best Actress of the Year (winner)
- Ninfa Award (2015) – Best Spanish Actress (nominee)
- AVN Awards (2016, 2017) – Female Foreign Performer of the Year (nominee)
