= Migliore (surname) =

Migliore is a surname of Italian origin. The name refers to:

- Aniello Migliore (1933–2019), American mobster; leader of the New York Lucchese crime family
- Celestino Migliore (b. 1952), Italian Roman Catholic archbishop
- Cristiano Migliore (b. 1971), Italian metal musician
- Daniel L. Migliore, Christian theologian and author
- Jose Migliore (1930-2022) Argentine race car driver
- Oliviero Migliore (also known as Holly One) (1965–2006), Italian pornographic actor
- Pablo Migliore (b. 1982), Argentine professional football player
- Richard Migliore (b. 1964), American Thoroughbred racing jockey
- Vincent Migliore, American politician

== See also ==
- Migliori
