= The Good Girl (2004 film) =

- Cover art of The Good Girl.
- Directed by: Erika Lust
- Produced by: Lust Films
- Starring: Claudia Claire; Lucas Foz
- Release date: 2004
- Running time: 21 minutes
- Country: Spain
- Language: English

The Good Girl is a 2004 Spanish independent pornographic short film directed by Erika Lust and produced by Lust Films. The story is a traditional "pizza delivery guy" cliché, but takes place from a female perspective, and makes fun of typical porn clichés by subversion. The duration of the film is 21 minutes.

== Plot ==
The protagonist, Alexandra or simply "Alex" (performed by Claudia Claire), is smart and successful, but apparently prudish: a 'good girl' who often thinks about sex, but usually doesn't act upon it. Alex receives a phone call from her friend Julie, a more openly sexual character who tells Alex about her latest sexual conquest, her yoga instructor. Instead of being turned on by Julie's story, Alex is bored by it, and tired of being shy and missing out of sexual experiences she herself might have (had) if she had the courage, challenges herself to be more sexually active and risqué. Alex then starts talking about various silly porn scenarios she might want to experience. One such scenario she often saw in porn films was the pizza delivery guy cliché, but she criticises the idea as unrealistic, reasoning pizza delivery boys usually aren't very attractive.

Frustrated with Julie's bragging, and hungry, Alex orders a pizza while she takes a shower. When the doorbell rings, Alex exits the shower with just a towel wrapped around her body and opens the door to find an unexpectedly attractive pizza delivery man (played by Lucas Foz). Alex tells the viewer: 'He is not a normal pizza guy. He is gorgeous.' She lets him inside her studio while clumsily looking for money to pay him; when she finds some, she pays him for the pizza, and he leaves, somewhat puzzled by Alex's odd behaviour. Closing the door behind him, Alex leans back against it and slowly sinks to the floor as she feels bad for once again failing to seize the opportunity to do something adventurous. Seconds later, the pizza deliverer rings Alex's doorbell again because he forgot his helmet. This time she doesn't just think, but decides to act upon her sexual desire. She opens the door, jumps at the delivery guy and hugs him, imagining he returned for her, but the confused man says softly: 'Sorry, I forgot my helmet', and he goes to pick it up. Then they stare at each other, confused about what just happened and unsure what to do next.

As the man moves to leave again, Alex says: 'Wait a moment, please.' After overcoming her doubts, Alex finds the courage to drop her towel to reveal her naked body, and the man looks at her. His astonishment slowly gives way to awe, as he puts his helmet back on the table, slowly walks towards Alex, touches her gently, and then kisses her passionately. She leads him to her bed, and they proceed to have passionate sex. After Alex experiences an intense and satisfying orgasm while they are spooning, the man puts Alex on her back and goes to sit on her chest. Alex tells him: 'I want you to cum in my face like in porn movies,' which he does. Afterwards, they introduce themselves (the man is called "Paulo") and exchange phone numbers. At the end, Alex looks back on what happened and says: 'Somehow that moment was my liberation... of not always doing what's expected of a 'good girl' like me.

== Production and distribution ==
The Good Girl was the directing debut of Erika Lust. She set up her company Lust Films with the help of an investor and friend, who invested 30,000 euros in producing The Good Girl as a pilot to spread their business idea. Lust (2009–2010) stated: 'We started lustfilms.com and we decided to give for free (under a Creative Commons Copyleft license) our short film. That made the company explode and after that we have not stopped.' A Digg poster claimed that it was first porn film under a Creative Commons license when its internet version was released in 2006. It was downloaded 'millions of times in several days' and 'two million times in two months'. LustFilm stopped distributing it for free in 2007 when it became part of a movie named Cinco historias para ellas (Five Hot Stories for Her), though the original clip distributed under a Creative Commons Attribution-NonCommercial-NoDerivs 2.5 License can be still downloaded from other places. The Good Girl was shown as part of Five Hot Stories for Her at the 2007 Barcelona International Erotic Film Festival.

== Reception ==
The Good Girl set the tone for Erika Lust's filmmaking style, and launched her career as 'one of the most celebrated feminist pornographers in the world'. It was nominated for best short film of the year at the Barcelona International Erotic Film Festival (FICEB 2005), and at the FICEB 2007, Five Hot Stories for Her (of which The Good Girl was one) won the Best Manuscript award. It also won a Ninfa Award, and due to The Good Girl, Five Hot Stories for Her won the Best Film of the Year at the 2008 Feminist Porn Awards.

The short film was well received by many viewers, particularly for subverting many expectations, and putting the female perspective, female desire and pleasure front and centre. Some subversions noted by commentators include challenging the traditional dichotomy between the "prude" (Alex) and the "courtesan" (Julie) by presenting a complex female protagonist who 'overcomes her hang-ups so she can enjoy––on her own terms—her body and sexuality'; respecting the female body by showing complete bodies and focusing of facial expressions; Paulo not being a confident man who takes the initiative, but puzzled and astonished, just trying to do his job while patiently and gently waiting for Alex to make her first moves at several occasions; and Alex being curious, joyful and playful, having 'real breasts', not wearing high heels, not being aroused by Julie telling about her sexual experiences, and not 'swallow[ing] the male's penis like a human vacuum cleaner.' Anne Sabo (2012) described the decisive scene in which Alex and Paulo stare at each other as 'comical, embarrassing, and heartbreaking all at the same time, but it has to be now or never; she lets the towel fall, peeking up at him. And in an instantaneous connection, he sees her.'

Some elements of the film were also criticised. Especially the inclusion of a facial cum shot was regarded by many as representative of problematic aspects of mainstream pornography that should not feature in feminist porn. Anastasia (2006) stated: 'Outside of this one teeny weeny element [the facial], for me, the remaining 99.9% is appealing, humorous, sharp, erotic, sensual, playful and interesting.' In a panel discussion at the 2007 Berlin Porn Film Festival, several other self-identified feminist pornographers questioned Lust's inclusion of the facial in this and other films she had produced thus far, with Petra Joy writing a few days afterwards: 'Feminism is committed to equality of the sexes, so surely "feminist porn" should show women as equals to men rather than as subservient beings... If you want to show cum on a woman's face that's fine but don't call it feminist.' Lust (2007) retorted, mocking 'the Church of the Pure Feminist Porn Producers... declaring that certain sexual practices that me and other women across the world happen to like, are a sin.'

Maes (2017) critically remarked that the facial at the end was at odds with the 'tendedly and beautifully filmed lovemaking' before it, concluding: 'Thus, the film continues and even celebrates this most prevalent trope of inegalitarian pornography rather than subverting it.' Moreover, he interpreted the scene of Alex dropping her towel as negatively 'eroticizing' female sexual vulnerability. On the other hand, Heck (2021) was generally positive about the film, arguing that Alex's vulnerability was 'carefully contextualized' within a wider narrative of having agency, gaining courage and taking initiative. To Heck, Lust was 'attempting to subvert the hegemony of the facial, not by ignoring its prevalence but instead by presenting this act in a more realistic way than is typical in mainstream pornography.' The context makes clear that Alex wants it, and asks for it, because she is curious about it (as she has seen it in mainstream porn, even though she criticised mainstream porn earlier on), perhaps as part 'of her newfound boldness, taken to an extreme in the heat of the moment'. '[T]hose who regard facials as unavoidably misogynistic (...) will be unimpressed', but in that case 'it has little to do with pornography but rests upon an independent claim that a certain sexual act is always unethical, even when it is enthusiastically consensual and wanted.' Nevertheless, Heck pointed out a further sequencing error similar to how 'contrived' facial scenes in mainstream porn are, which undermined The Good Girl's 'subversive potential': 'The sex overall is convincingly realistic: the kind of thing that people like Alex and Paulo might actually do. But Paulo's rolling Alex onto her back and then straddling her chest seems, given what she goes on to say, prearranged, and it is not at all convincing.' Another loose end in the narrative is that no clear indication is given (either to Alex or the viewer) why Paulo finds Alex attractive, and accepts her unexpected non-verbal invitation to have sex.

== See also ==
- Women's erotica

== Bibliography ==
- Heck, Richard Kimberly (2021). "How Not to Watch Feminist Pornography". Feminist Philosophy Quarterly. 7 (1) 3. doi:10.5206/fpq/2021.1.10609. S2CID 233801831.
- Jones, Alexandra (August 2014). "Agency and Pornography: Erika Lust's Female Gaze" (PDF). Savannah College of Art and Design.
