= Migliori =

Migliori is an Italian surname. Notable people with the surname include:

- Ambra Migliori, Italian swimmer
- Francesco Migliori, Italian painter
- Franco Migliori, Argentine basketball player
- Gabriel Migliori, Brazilian composer
- Jay Migliori, American saxophonist

== See also ==
- Migliore (surname)
