= Mark of Zorro (1975 film) =

- Directed by: Franco Lo Cascio
- Written by: Augusto Finocchi; Francisco Lara Polop
- Starring: George Hilton; Lionel Stander
- Cinematography: Franco Villa
- Edited by: Renzo Lucidi
- Music by: Gianfranco Plenizio
- Release date: 1975
- Running time: 97 minutes
- Country: Italy
- Language: Italian

Mark of Zorro (Italian: Ah sì? E io lo dico a Zzzzorro!, also known as Who's Afraid of Zorro and They Call Him Zorro... Is He?) is a 1975 Italian adventure comedy film directed by Franco Lo Cascio.

== Cast ==
- George Hilton: Felipe Mackintosh / Zorro
- Lionel Stander: Father Donato
- Charo López: Rosita Florenda
- Rodolfo Licari: Don Manuel La Paz
- Antonio Pica: Major De Colignac
- Gino Pagnani: Betrunkener

== See also ==
- List of Italian films of 1975
