= Erika Lust =

Swedish pornographic film director

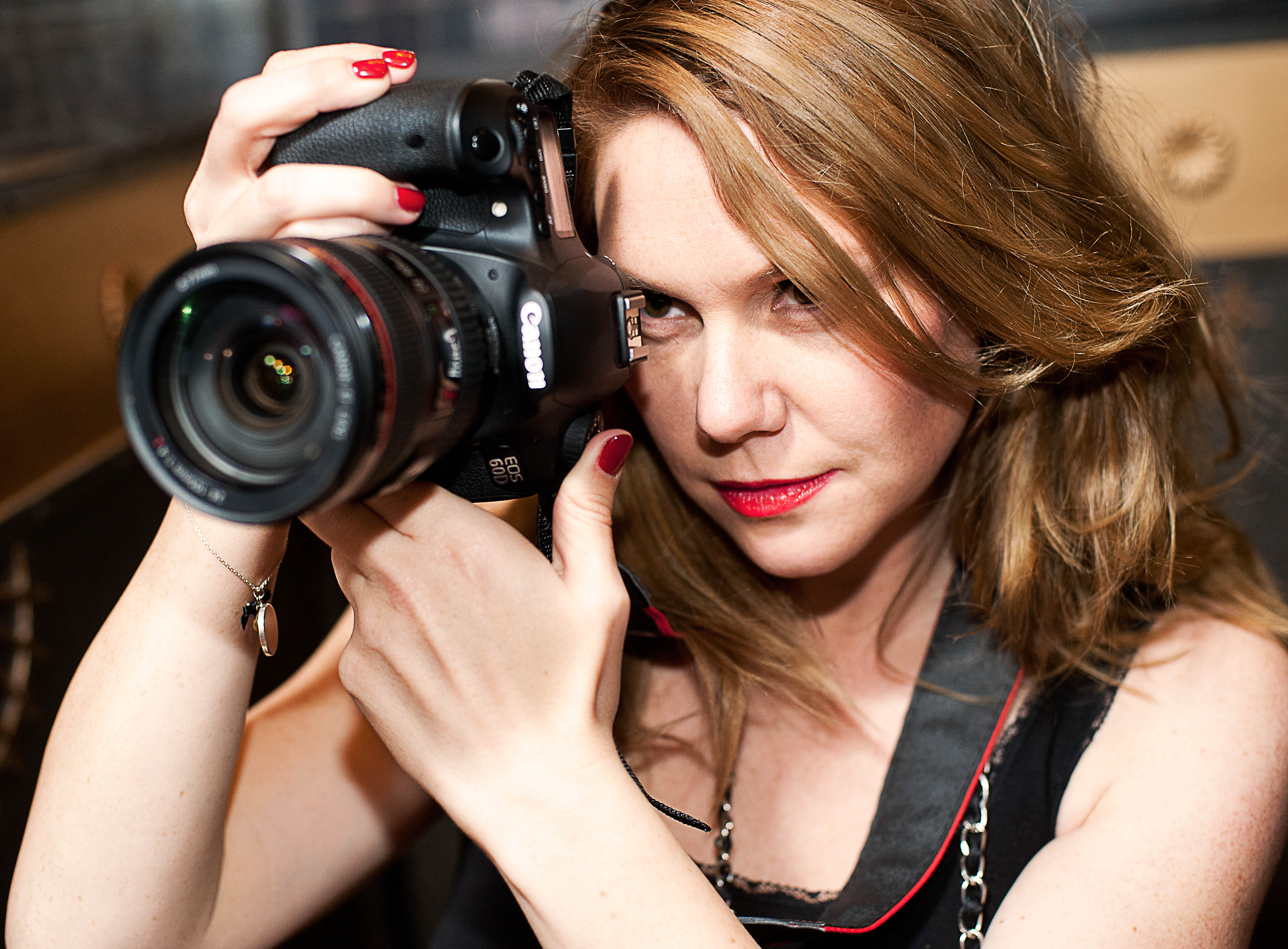
- Lust in 2012
- Born: Erika Hallqvist; 1977 (age 48–49); Stockholm, Sweden
- Education: BA in Political Sciences, Lund University, 1999
- Occupations: Writer; director; producer
- Years active: 2004–present
- Spouse: Pablo Dobner
- Children: 2
- Website: erikalust.com

Erika Lust (born 1977) is a Swedish pornographic film director, screenwriter and producer. Since the release of her first erotic film The Good Girl in 2004, Lust has been described as part of the feminist pornography movement. She has said that an ethical production process distinguishes her company from mainstream pornography sites.

Lust has said that she has no objection to describing her films as pornography, because she expects viewers to be sexually aroused. In addition to directing and producing films, she has written several books.

== Background ==
Lust was born Erika Hallqvist in Stockholm, Sweden, in 1977. She developed an interest in film and theatre.

She attended Lund University, where she studied political science. While there, she read Linda Williams' 1989 book Hard Core: Power, Pleasure, and the "Frenzy of the Visible", which later influenced her filmmaking. She graduated with a BA in 1999, with a specialization in human rights and feminism. After graduation she moved to Barcelona, Spain in 2000 and began studying filmmaking.

== Career ==
Lust made her first film, the explicit short The Good Girl, in 2004. Released free online under a Creative Commons licence, it was downloaded widely online. The film was shown at the Barcelona International Erotic Film Festival the next year and won a Ninfa Award.

In 2005, she founded her video production company Lust Films. The company has since produced erotic short films and compilations. Five Hot Stories For Her, an anthology of five vignettes including The Good Girl, won the Barcelona International Erotic Film Festival's 2007 Best Spanish Screenplay award, the Venus Berlin Fair's 2007 Eroticline Award for Best Adult Film for Women, and the 2008 Feminist Porn Award for Movie of the Year. Her work has continued to appear on the adult cinema festival circuit, and in 2020 one of her films received a conventional cinema release.

=== Development ===
Lust's films have been noted for their casting and production values in adult film. She has said that explicit film can be both pleasurable and educational, and that it can contribute to discussion of sexuality and gender roles. She has described pornography as the "most important discourse on gender and sexuality".

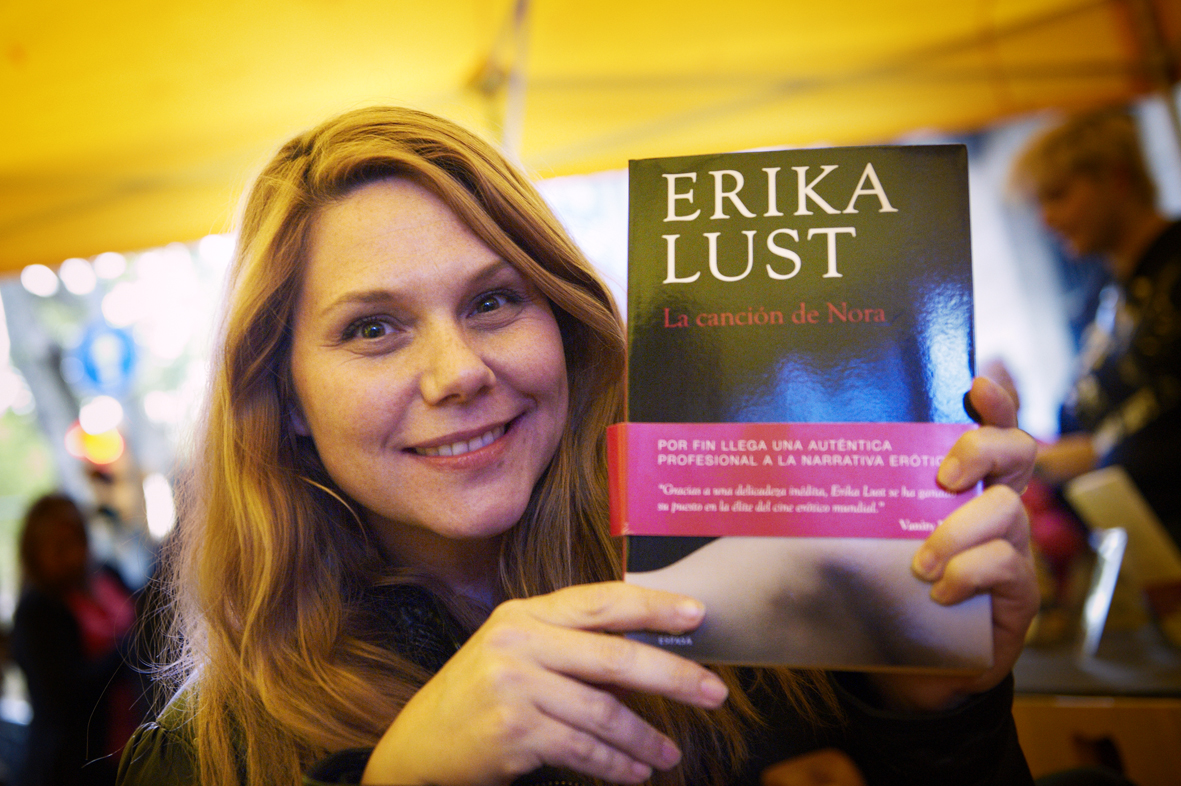
Lust in 2013

In 2010, Lust launched an online erotic cinema called Lust Cinema, which exhibits her own films and those of other directors working in explicit film. In 2013, she launched the crowd-sourced project XConfessions. It later became a major part of her work.

In 2017, Glamour included Lust Cinema in a list of feminist porn sites. In 2019, Lust was named as one of the BBC's 100 Women of 2019.

=== Other projects ===
Lust has written several books on eroticism and sexuality; her first book, Good Porn, was published in 2009 by Seal Press. The book discusses recurring themes and conventions in mainstream heterosexual pornography.

Lust runs an online store that sells her books and films, as well as sex toys and other products. In February 2016, her company had about 15 employees.

In 2017, in consultation with sex educators, Lust and her husband Pablo Dobner created the website The Porn Conversation, intended as a resource for parents. The site links to research and offers advice on discussing the unrealistic aspects of mainstream pornography with children.

== Films ==
Her film Cabaret Desire (2011) won the Feminist Porn Award for Movie of the Year in 2012 and the CineKink Audience Choice Award for Best Narrative Feature. It was later cited as an example of the range of work shown at the 2013 Berlin Porn Film Festival.

In 2020, her film The Intern received three nominations at the XBIZ Europa Awards, including Feature Movie of the Year, Best Acting, and Best Sex Scene in a Feature Movie. Her film Super Femmes was also nominated for Best Lesbian Sex Scene. Erika Lust Films was nominated for Global Studio Brand of the Year, and her online streaming platform XConfessions was nominated for Erotic Site of the Year.

=== XConfessions ===
In 2014, Lust and other directors began producing short pornographic films based on crowd-sourced stories. Viewers can leave anonymous confessions on the project's website. Each month, Lust selects two stories and adapts them into short films. XConfessions was screened at the Berlin Porn Festival in 2014. The first two compilations in the series won Feminist Porn Awards for Hottest Straight Vignette in 2014 and 2015.

In 2015, a theatrical cut of XConfessions was screened at Chicago International Film Festival and at Raindance Film Festival in London.

Lust held two screenings of the XConfessions Theatrical Cut at Kino Babylon in Berlin in February 2016, and the short film An Appointment with My Master later won the Best Narrative Short CineKink Award.

== Reception ==
Film scholar Álvaro Martín Sanz has described Lust as part of a feminist turn in pornography that rejects the heteronormativity of traditional pornographic cinema, while also arguing that her work remains limited by its emphasis on beauty and fantasy rather than more realistic portrayals of sex.

Lust has argued that no sexual acts, including temporary and consensual self-objectification, BDSM, risk-aware violence, or extreme fantasy, should be labeled "non-feminist". Philosopher Richard Kimberly Heck defended Lust against criticism by Hans Maes, who had argued that Lust's film The Good Girl differed little from mainstream pornography because of the female protagonist's passivity and the inclusion of a facial in the final scene. Heck argued instead that the character's behavior was more realistic than stereotypical pornographic representations and that consensual sexual practices commonly viewed as degrading may still be compatible with feminist pornography.

== Personal life ==
Lust married businessman Pablo Dobner, who is the co-founder and CEO of Lust film. The couple resides in Barcelona, Spain with their two daughters.

== Books ==
2013 interview about Lust's books

- 2009: X: a Woman's Guide to Good Porn (alternate title: Good Porn: A Woman's Guide)
  - First published 2008 in Spanish as Porno para mujeres (Porn for Women)
- 2010: Erotic Bible to Europe
- 2010: Love Me Like You Hate Me with Venus O'Hara
- 2011: Shooting Sex: How to Make an Outstanding Sex Movie with Your Partner (ebook also available in Polish)
- 2011: Six Female Voices with Antia Pagant
- 2013: La Canción de Nora (Nora's Song)
- 2013: Let's Make a Porno

== Honours and awards ==
Year	Sponsoring Organisation	Award	Category	Entry	Result
2005	Barcelona Intl Erotic Film Festival	Ninfa Award	First Prize for Short X-Films	The Good Girl	Won
2007	Barcelona Intl Erotic Film Festival	Ninfa Award	Best Spanish Screenplay	Five Hot Stories for Her	Won
2007	Venus Fair Berlin	Eroticline Award	Best Adult Film for Women	Five Hot Stories for Her	Won
2008	Good for Her Toronto	Feminist Porn Award	Movie of the Year	Five Hot Stories for Her	Won
2008	CineKink New York	CineKink Award	Best Short	Something about Nadia	Honorable Mention
2008	Venus Fair Berlin	Eroticline Award	Best Erotic Documentary	Barcelona Sex Project	Won
2009	Good for Her Toronto	Feminist Porn Award	Movie of the Year	Barcelona Sex Project	Honorable Mention
2010	CineKink New York	CineKink Award	Best Experimental Short Film	Handcuffs	Won
2010	Good for Her Toronto	Feminist Porn Award	Sexiest Short Film	Handcuffs	Won
2011	Good for Her Toronto	Feminist Porn Award	Movie of the Year	Life Love Lust	Won
2011	CineKink New York	CineKink Award	Best Short	Room 33	Honorable Mention
2011	Orgazmik Zürich	Orgazmik Award	Best Film (Couples)	Cabaret Desire	Won
2012	Good for Her Toronto	Feminist Porn Award	Movie of the Year	Cabaret Desire	Won
2012	CineKink New York	CineKink Audience Choice Award	Best Narrative Feature	Cabaret Desire	Won
2012	Cupido Norway	Cupido Filmpris		Handcuffs	Won
2014	Good for Her Toronto	Feminist Porn Award	Hottest Straight Vignette Series	XConfessions vol. 1	Won
2014	Fetisch Film Festival Germany	Fetisch Award	Best Feature-Length	XConfessions vol. 1	Won
2015	Good for Her Toronto	Feminist Porn Award		The Art of Spanking	Nominated
2015	Good for Her Toronto	Feminist Porn Award	Hottest Straight Vignette	XConfessions vol. 2	Won
2015	Good for Her Toronto	Feminist Porn Award	Website	xconfessions.com	Honorable Mention
2016	CineKink New York	CineKink Award	Best Narrative Short	An Appointment with my Master	Won
2017	Fish&Chips Film Festival, Turin		Best Short Movie XXX	Pouring Pleasure	Won
2018	Festival Internacional de Cine en Guadalajara, Mexico	Maguey Over the Rainbow Award	Maguey award	Erika Lust	Won
2018	Festival Internacional de Cine de Puerto Vallarta			Erika Lust	Won
2018	Toronto International Porn Festival	Feminist Porn Award	Most Tantalizing Trans Short	We Are The Fucking Worldaccess	Won
2018	Toronto International Porn Festival	Feminist Porn Award	Sexiest Sci-Fi	Touch Crimes	Won
2018	Toronto International Porn Festival	Feminist Porn Award	Dazzling: Docu-Porn	Tie Me Up! A Shibari Documentary	Won
2018	Toronto International Porn Festival	Feminist Porn Award		Moist	Won
2018	Toronto International Porn Festival	Feminist Porn Award	Best Kink Short	Dirty Feet	Won
2019	Peephole Film Festival, Mexico		Best Erotic Short Film	Don't Call Me a Dick (XConfessions)	Won
2020	CineKink New York	Audience Choice Award	Best Narrative Feature	Volunteers Wanted	Won
2020	CineKink New York		Best Dramatic Short	The MILF Next Door	Won
2020	La Fête du Slip - Lausanne, Switzerland		Slip d'Or Short Film	Switch (XConfessions)	Won
2020	XBiz Awards (Europe)		Best Acting	Lena Anderson, "The Intern" (Lust Cinema)	Won
2020	XBiz Awards (Europe)		Best Sex Scene-Lesbian	Estella Bathory, Luna Corazon & Natassia Dreams, "Super Femmes" (XConfessions)	Won
2025	XMA Europa Awards	Vanguard Award			Won
