= Bibian Norai =

Spanish pornographic actress (born 1967)

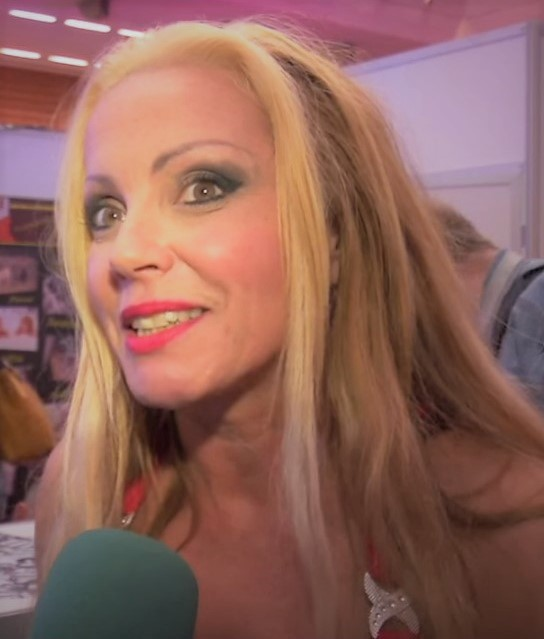
- Born: 1 September 1967 (age 58); Amposta, Tarragona, Spain
- Other names: Bibi, Bibian Norani, Bibian Nortai, Bibiana
- Height: 5 ft 6 in (1.68 m)
- Website: http://www.bibiannorai.com

Bibian Norai (born 1 September 1967) is a Spanish pornographic actress. She won FICEB Ninfa Awards for Best Spanish Actress (The Fetish Garden) in 2003 and Best Director (Public) in 2004.

Norai was the artistic director of the Salon Erotico de Barcelona. She was affiliated with the film festival and its predecessor for over twenty years, first as an actress near the beginning of her career and then in various aspects of its production after 2003. During her time, she created a section at the show dedicated to women consumers and producers. She resigned as artistic director in 2018 over what she saw as the decline of the show.
