= Andrea Gessa =

Italian footballer (born 1980)

Personal information
- Date of birth: 12 January 1980 (age 46)
- Place of birth: Milan, Italy
- Height: 1.75 m (5 ft 9 in)
- Position: Midfielder

Youth career
- 1997–1998: Brugherio
- 2001–2002: Pergocrema

Senior career*
Years	Team	Apps	(Gls)
1998–2000	Voghera	29	(0)
2002–2004	Pizzighettone	50	(1)
2004–2005	Montevarchi	35	(2)
2005–2009	Grosseto	114	(5)
2009–2012	Pescara	78	(4)
2012–2013	Cesena	21	(0)
2013–2015	Frosinone	33	(1)
2015	→ Pescara (loan)	7	(0)
- * Club domestic league appearances and goals

Andrea Gessa (born 12 January 1980) is an Italian former footballer who played as a midfielder.

== Career ==
On 10 July 2012, Gessa was transferred from Pescara to newly relegated Serie B side Cesena in exchange for Giuseppe Colucci.
