= Roberto Malone =

Italian pornographic film actor and director

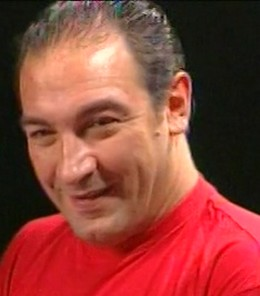
- Malone in a scene from the French porn film Sextet (1997)
- Born: October 31, 1956 (age 69); Turin, Italy
- Other names: Roberto Malonne, R. Malone, Robert Malonene, Bob Malone, Roberto Moreno, Robert Mawio, Roberto Mallone, Roberto Melone, Peppino, Robert Mauro, Robert Malone, Pepino, Frank Mallone, Bob Holmes, Roberto Mei

Roberto Malone (born October 31, 1956) is a former Italian pornographic film actor and director who has appeared in over 375 pornographic films.

Although best known under the pseudonym "Roberto Malone", he has also performed under the names of "Bob Holmes" or "Roberto Mel".

He was briefly married to Dutch pornographic film actress Zara Whites. He was then married to Hungarian pornographic film actress Eva Falk. He is now married to French actress Axelle-Rose Leclercq (born January 10, 1980) early in 2018. He is the father of Andrea Malone.

He played a small role in Catherine Breillat's film Romance.

Malone's best portrayal, according to Marco Giusti, was that of Al Capone in the film of the same name.

His portrayal of a porn version of DSK attracted attention from certain mainstream media.

== Awards and nominations ==
- 2003 Ninfa Award winner - Best Actor (Public)
- 2004 Ninfa Award winner - Best Supporting Actor (La cripta de los culos - Interseleccion)
- 2004 European X Award winner – Best Actor (Italy)
- 2005 Ninfa Award winner - Best Actor (Sex mistere)
- 2007 Ninfa Award winner - Best Supporting Actor (Mi Padre - Stars And Stamps)
- 2008 Ninfa Special Jury Award winner - Lifetime Achievement
