= Narcis Bosch =

Spanish pornographic film director

- Born: Spain
- Other name: Narcís Bosch

Narcis Bosch is a Spanish pornographic film director.

In 2005, he won the AVN Award for Best Director, Foreign Release for the film Hot Rats (IFG/Smash Pictures).

He has also won the FICEB Ninfa Award for Best Spanish Director five times. Once was in the year 2000 for Bulls and Milk (International Film Grup), again in 2002 for Psycho Sex (International Film Grup), again in 2003 for Hot Rats, another was in 2004 for Crazy Bullets (International film grup), and the last time was in 2007 for Hot Rats 2 (Film Corporation 2000).
