= Barcelona International Erotic Film Festival =

Film festival and awards ceremony

- Date: 1992
- Location: Barcelona and Madrid
- Country: Spain

The Barcelona International Erotic Film Festival or FICEB (Festival Internacional de Cinema Eròtic de Barcelona in Catalan) is an annual Spanish pornographic film festival and awards ceremony. It is the oldest adult film festival in Europe.

The event dates from 1992. Since 1997, it has been held in the La Farga convention center in L'Hospitalet de Llobregat, a suburb of the Barcelona. In 2005, the event was recognized by the regional government of Catalonia, but, in 2006, the L'Hospitalet municipal government controversially voted not to renew the festival's contract, requiring it to seek a new location (Madrid) for 2007–08. The FICEB moved to Madrid in 2008 and was held at the Room Fabrik.

Compared to the analogous Hot d'Or film festival in Cannes, the Barcelona festival has been called less exclusive and more comprehensive. Besides film awards and star appearances, the five days of FICEB include hundreds of strip-tease and live sex shows, as well as a lingerie show and a sex product fair with adult toys. The event exists, in part, to promote the sex industry in Spain by promoting the domestic production of adult films and organizing discussion forums. At or above 50,000 people attended the festival in 2005, 2006, and 2007. The FICEB has served as launching pad for actresses, actors, and directors such as: Sophie Evans, Celia Blanco, Nacho Vidal, Max Cortés, Sara Bernat, and Toni Ribas.

The Mexico Erotic Festival is backed by the same group responsible for the Festival Internacional de Cinema Eròtic de Barcelona (FICEB).

In 2024, a new and unaffiliated festival titled Erotic Film Festival Barcelona was launched and is not affiliated with the historical FICEB. The new festival was created with the goal of reviving international erotic cinema events in Barcelona. Its inaugural edition took place from 24–30 November 2024, featuring film screenings, panel discussions, and industry events at various venues in the city. A second edition occurred on 28–30 November 2025.

== FICEB awards ==
The FICEB has three awards for different categories of pornographic films, the Ninfa (Nymph - where there are some twenty-eight categories) for heterosexual pornography, the HeatGay for gay pornography films and the Tacón de Aguja (High heel or Stiletto heel) for BDSM and sexual fetish films. The year 2002 was the first year with a "Short Film Competition X" at the FICEB, where the winner of that contest was endowed with 2,400 Euros and second place was awarded 1,200 Euros.

The following is a list of the winners in the major categories for the Ninfa awards only. A more complete list of winners can be found through the External Links listed below.

=== Ninfa award winners 2000–2004 ===
	2000	2001	2002	2003	2004
Best Film	Stavros	LA PROVOCACIÓN	Fade to Black	La Dolce Vita	Compulsión
Best 100% Sex Film	Dirty Anal Kelly in Rome	Orgínas Vikingas	Ass Collector	Back 2 Evil	Rocco meats Suzie
Best Spanish Film	Bulls and Milk	Gothix	Fausto	Hot Rats	Crazy Bullets
Best Spanish 100% Sex Film			Caníbales sexuales	Caníbales sexuales	Serial Fucker 5
Best Director	Alain Payet - La fete a Gigi	Mario Salieri - Divina	Rocco Siffredi - Ass Collector	Thomas Zupko - Jugando a médicos	Axel Braun - Compulsión
Best Spanish Director	Narcís Bosch - Bulls and Milk	José María Ponce - Gothix	Narcis Bosch - Psycho Sex	Narcís Bosch - Hot Rats	Narcís Bosch - Crazy Bullets
Best Actor	Nacho Vidal - Buttman's Anal Divas	Nacho Vidal - Face dance obsession	Rocco Siffredi - Ass Collector	Nacho Vidal - Back 2 Evil	Ron Jeremy - The Magic Sex Genie
Best Actress	Laura Angel - Alexia and CIA	Sophie Evans - Virtualia The Series	Laura Angel - Angelmania	Belladonna - The Fashionistas	Katsumi - PokerWom
Best Spanish Actor	Max Cortés - 6 Culos Vírgenes En Las Garras De Max	Max Cortés - Perras Amaestradas	Max Cortés - Sex Maniaco	Max Cortés - Teorema X	Ramón Guevara - 616DF - El Diablo español vs las luchadoras del este
Best Spanish Actress	Sara Bernat - Vivir Follando	Carmen - Sex Meat	Celia Blanco - Delirio y Carne	Bibian Norai - The Fetish Garden	Claudia Claire - Fantasías de una sexóloga
Best Supporting Actor	Holly One - Bulls and Milk	Steve Holmes - Eternal Love	Denis Marti - Sex Maniaco	Francesco Malcom - La Dolce Vita	Roberto Malone - La cripta de los culos
Best Supporting Actress	Julia Taylor- Stavros	Monica Sweetheart - Face dance obsession	Rita Faltoyano - Fausto	Michelle Wild - Hot Rats	Dora Venter - La Memoria de los peces
Best Supporting Spanish Actor					Andrea Moranti - Sex Reality
Best Supporting Spanish Actress					Carmen - Crazy Bullets
Best Starlette	Karma - Euro Hard Ball 7	Jessica May - Perras Amaestradas	Katsumi - L'Affaire Katsumi	Cristina Bella - The Fetish Garden	Anastasia Mayo
(Public) Best Actor		Toni Ribas	Nacho Vidal	Roberto Malone	Francesco Malcom
(Public) Best Actress		Tavalia Griffin	Ovidie	Sophie Evans	Silvia Saint
(Public) Best Director		Conrad Son	Alain Payet	Max Hardcore	Bibian Norai
(Public) Lifetime Career	Luca Damiano	Marc Dorcel	Roberto Malone	John Stagliano	Pierre Woodman

=== Ninfa Award winners 2005–2008 ===
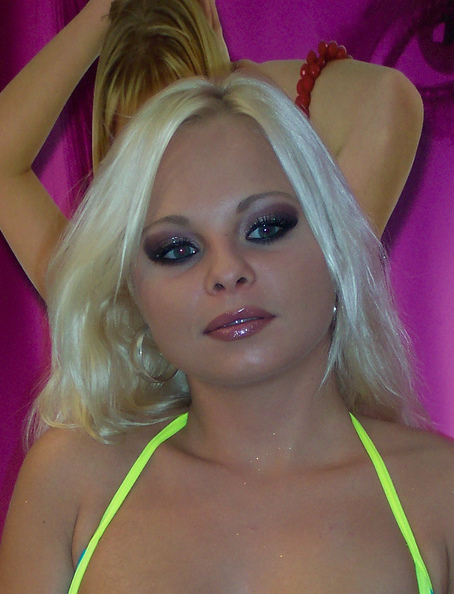
Sharka Blue at the October 2006 FICEB

	2005	2006	2007	2008
Best Picture	Who fucked Rocco?	Dark Angels 2	Fashionistas Safado	Casino No Limit
Best 100% Sex Film	Wet Dreams	Fuck Me	Backstage	Eskade the Submission
Best Spanish Film	A través de la ventana	The Gift	Mi Padre De Giancarlo Candiano	The Resolution
Best Spanish 100% Sex Film	Serial Fucker 6	Tú descarga delante y yo descargo detrás	Ibiza Sex Party	Nick Follando Españolas
Best Director	Fred Coppula - Fuck Club	James Avalon - La mansión del placer	Mario Salieri - La Viuda De La Camorra	Hervé Bodilis - Casino No Limit
Best Spanish Director		Pepe Catman - Mantis	Narcis Bosch - Hot Rats 2	Roberto Valtueña - Mundo Perro
Best Actor	Roberto Malone - Sex mistere	Nacho Vidal - Back 2 Evil 2	Rocco Siffredi - Fashionistas Safado	Mick Blue - The Resolution
Best Actress	Katsuni - Who fucked Rocco?	Mya Diamond - Sex Angels 2	Katsuni - French Connection	Nina Roberts - Casino No Limit
Best Spanish Actor	Max Cortés - A Través de la Ventana	Ramón Nomar - Mantis	Roberto Chivas - Mi Padre	Samuel Soler - The Game
Best Spanish Actress	Claudia Claire - A través de la ventana	Sonia Baby - Mantis	Mónica Vera - Talion	Salma de Nora - The Resolution
Best Supporting Actor	Don Fernando - Salieri Airlines	Randy Spears - La mansión del placer	Roberto Malone - Mi Padre	Oliver Sanchez - The Resolution
Best Supporting Actress	Sharka Blue - Sex mistere	Julie Silver - Thrill Kill	Rebeca Linares - Iodine Girl	Tarra White - Wild Waves
Best Supporting Spanish Actor		Carlos Darío - Chupitos de semen	Andrea Moranty - La Obsexión	Paco Roca - Mundo Perro
Best Supporting Spanish Actress	Dunia Montenegro - Who fucked Rocco?	Natalia Z - The Gift	Dunia Montenegro - Talion	Dunia Montenegro - The Resolution
Best Starlette	Angel Dark - Planet Silver: beautiful girls, beautiful breast	Milly Jay - Las perversiones de Silvia Saint	Divinity Love - Xcalibur: The Lords Of Sex 1	Lucky - Ibiza Sex Party 5
Best Spanish Starlette	Lucía Lapiedra - La santidad del mal		Sandra G - Mi Padre	Bianca Jebi - Sex 4 Rooms 3
FICEB Queen		Monica Vera		
(Public) Best Actor	Tom Byron	Tom Byron	Max Cortés	Nacho Vidal
(Public) Best Actress	Silvia Saint	Gina Lynn	Lady May	Anastasia Mayo
(Public) Best Director	Pierre Woodman	Giancarlo Candiano	Pierre Woodman	
(Public) Lifetime Career	Marc Dorcel	Nina Hartley	Sophie Evans	Mario Salieri

== 2013 winners ==
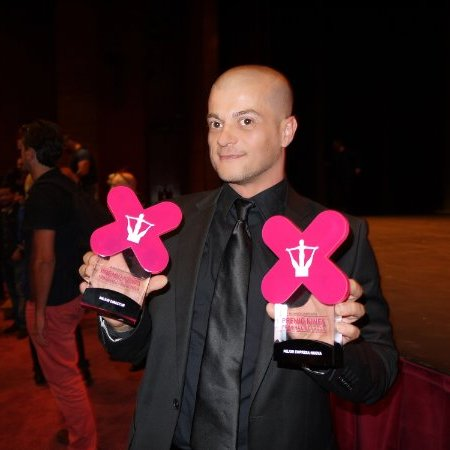
Roberto Chivas' awards from the 2013 FICEB

- Best Actor of the Year - Rob Diesel
- Best Actress of the Year - Gigi Love
- Best Actor of the Year in Gay-themed Videos - Martin Mazza
- Best New Actress - Noemilk
- Best Porn Artist Personal Website - zazelparadise.com
- Best Webcamer of the Year - Carolina Abril
- Best Porn Content Company of the Year - Actrices del Porno
- Best New Porn Content Company - Explicital
- Best Adult Content Website - actricesdelpono.com
- Best Sponsor - FA Webmasters
- Best Director of the Year - Roberto Chivas
- Best Video Editor - Irina Vega
- Best Adult Content Media - Estrellas del Porno
- Best Series of the Year - La Mansión de Nacho Vidal (Actrices del Porno)
- Best Amateur Series of the Year - Arnaldo Series (Fakings)
- Best International Adult Content Company - Brazzers
- Honorary Prize Awarded by the Organization - Torbe
- Special Award of the Barcelona Erotic Show Klic-Klic - Katya Sambuca
- Best Actress Chosen by the Public - Amanda X
- Best Actor Chosen by the Public - Rafa García
- Best Spanish Adult Content Website Chosen by the Public - MiFacePorno.com

== 2014 winners ==
- Best Actor of the Year - David El Moreno
- Best Actress of the Year - Amarna Miller
- Best Actor in Gay Themed Movies - Alejandro Magno
- Best New Actress - Daytona X
- Best New Actor - Juan Lucho
- Best Director - Raúl Lora
- Best Porn Content Company - Actrices del Porno
- Best Porn Artist Personal Website - norabarcelona.com
- Best Gay Porn Content Company - LocuraGay
- Best Adult Content Website - actricesdelporno.com
- Best Webcamer - Silvia Rubí
- Best Adult Content Media - Conrad Son Show
- Best Gay Scene - El Masajista (LocuraGay)
- Best Series - Anal Divas by Franceska Jaimes (ADP)
- Best BDSM Scene - Light VS Hard (Red Devil X)
- Best Amateur Themed Series - Cástings Porno (ZasXXX)
- Best International Adult Content Company - Brazzers
- Best Actress Chosen by the Public - Carolina Abril
- Best Actor Chosen by the Public - Nacho Vidal
- Best Website Chosen by the Public - putalocura.com
- Best Gay Actor Chosen by the Public - Antonio Miracle
- Honorable Award by the Organization - Max Cortés
- Special Award - Bonnie Rotten

== 2015 Winners ==
- Best Actor of the Year - Potro de Bilbao
- Best Actor in a Gay-themed Film- Ángel Cruz
- Best Release Actor- Alberto Blanco
- Best Newcomer Gay Actor- Viktor Rom
- Best Webcamer - Carla Pons
- Best Gay Scene - Gay of Thrones, Men.com
- Best BDSM New Generation Scene Cap 6 – Actricesdelporno
- Best Amateur Scene - The First Anal of Apolonia, Pablo Ferrari
- Best Actor Chosen by the Public - Nacho Vidal
- Best Scene/Series of the Year - Bonnie Rotten - Actricesdelporno
- Best Actress of the year - Carolina Abril
- Best New Actress - Apolonia Lapiedra
- SEB Apricots Special Award 2015 - Ramón Nomar
- Best Personal Web of a porn artist - Amarna Miller
- Best adult content web - www.actricesdelporno.com
- First Line Award - Juani de Lucía
- Best Gay Actor Chosen by the Public - Abraham Montenegro
- Best Actress Chosen by the Public - Pamela Sanchez
- Best Web Chosen by the Public - Cumlouder
- Honorary Award by the Organization - Sophie Evans
