= Luna Miguel =

Spanish poet, writer and editor (born 1990)

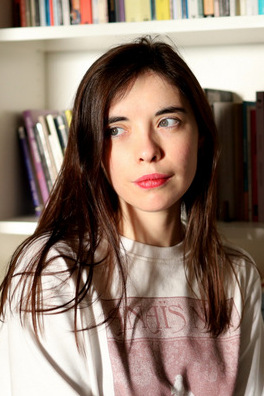
- Luna Miguel in 2021
- Born: Luna Miguel Santos; 6 November 1990 (age 35); Alcalá de Henares, Spain
- Occupations: Poet; writer; editor
- Writing career
- Language: Spanish
- Years active: 2010–present
- Notable awards: Premio Hermanos Argensola (2010)

Luna Miguel Santos (born 6 November 1990) is a Spanish poet, writer and editor. She won the Hermanos Argensola International Poetry Prize in 2010 for her collection Poetry is not dead. A poet and essayist first, she made her debut as a novelist in 2018 with El funeral de Lolita. Her other books include the essays El coloquio de las perras (2019), Caliente (2021) and Incensurable (2025), and the stage monologue Ternura y derrota (2021).

Alongside her writing, Miguel has worked as an editor at El Gaviero, her family's poetry press, as culture editor of the online magazine PlayGround, and as guest editor of the Penguin Random House imprint Caballo de Troya. Her books deal with the body, desire, reading and the women writers left out of the Spanish-language literary canon.

== Early life ==
She was born on 6 November 1990 in Alcalá de Henares, in the Community of Madrid, the daughter of the independent publisher Ana Santos Payán and the secondary-school teacher Pedro J. Miguel, who moved the family to Almería in the 1990s and founded the small poetry press El Gaviero Ediciones there in 2004. Her mother died in March 2014 after a long illness.

While still at secondary school, Miguel began contributing to the Almería newspaper La Voz de Almería. She went on to study for a journalism degree at the King Juan Carlos University in Madrid, but left in her final year after moving to Barcelona for an internship at the Random House publishing group.

== Poetry ==
In 2010, Miguel's book Poetry is not dead won the XLII Hermanos Argensola International Poetry Prize, awarded by the city council of Barbastro. Los estómagos ("The Stomachs"), her fifth collection, came out in 2015; El Asombrario described hers as a poetry that looks at the self and speaks of a generation and of the woman's body.

Her seventh collection, Poesía masculina ("Masculine Poetry"), appeared in 2021, more than a decade after her first, Estar enfermo (2010); written over five years, it adopts the voice of a man modelled on her own partner, in what she called a provocation against the label of "feminine poetry". Un amor español ("A Spanish Love"), published in 2023, examines her relationship with the idea of the homeland.

== Prose and essays ==
She published the short story Exhumación ("Exhumation"), written with Antonio J. Rodríguez, in 2010, and the essay El dedo. Breves apuntes sobre la masturbación femenina ("The Finger: Brief Notes on Female Masturbation") in 2016; by 2018 she was also a columnist for El Cultural. Her first novel, El funeral de Lolita ("The Funeral of Lolita"), was published by Lumen in November 2018; in it, a food critic named Helena reconsiders her life after the death of a former literature teacher she had been in love with, in a reworking of the myth of Vladimir Nabokov's Lolita.

In El coloquio de las perras ("The Colloquy of the Bitches", Capitán Swing, 2019), Miguel writes about women who wrote in Spanish and were pushed out of the canon, among them Elena Garro, Alejandra Pizarnik, Gabriela Mistral, María Emilia Cornejo, Agustina González López and Alcira Soust Scaffo. Caliente ("Hot", Lumen, 2021) mixes memoir and essay to address desire, monogamy and polyamory. In October 2025 she published Incensurable ("Uncensorable", Lumen), whose protagonist, a philosopher expelled from her university after giving a lecture on pleasure and censorship, lives in a near future in which Lolita has disappeared from every library in the world.

== Stage work ==
Ternura y derrota ("Tenderness and Defeat"), a monologue written and performed by Miguel, premiered on 9 December 2021 at the Teatro de la Comedia in Madrid, commissioned by the theatre as a companion piece to its simultaneous production of Cervantes' El cerco de Numancia. In 2022 she returned to the same theatre as dramatist and performer in El engaño, part of the Don Juan cycle El lugar y el mito created with Paola de Diego and Luis Sorolla. From 25 to 27 April 2023 she carried out La muerte de la lectora ("The Death of the Reader"), a performance at Madrid's Conde Duque cultural centre in which she read in public for 48 uninterrupted hours; it grew out of her essay Leer mata ("Reading Kills", La Caja Books, 2022), for which she had read James Joyce's Ulysses in three days as an experiment.

== Editing and journalism ==
After her mother's death in 2014, Miguel took over the editorship of El Gaviero and coordinated, with her mother, Serial, an anthology of poems inspired by television series with contributors including Elena Medel. She was culture editor of the online magazine PlayGround until December 2018. Together with Antonio J. Rodríguez she was guest editor of Caballo de Troya, a Penguin Random House imprint that invites a different writer each year to choose its titles, until the filmmaker Jonás Trueba took over for the 2021 catalogue. She has also written criticism for Babelia, the books supplement of El País.

== Personal life ==
She has a son, Ulises, and in 2021 was living in Barcelona. In 2026, El Confidencial described the philosopher Ernesto Castro as her husband.

== Selected works ==
=== Poetry ===
- Estar enfermo (La Bella Varsovia, 2010)
- Poetry is not dead (DVD, 2010)
- Pensamientos estériles (Cangrejo Pistolero, 2011)
- La tumba del marinero (La Bella Varsovia, 2013)
- Los estómagos (La Bella Varsovia, 2015)
- El arrecife de las sirenas (La Bella Varsovia, 2017)
- Poesía masculina (La Bella Varsovia, 2021)
- Un amor español (La Bella Varsovia, 2023)

=== Novel ===
- El funeral de Lolita (Lumen, 2018)

=== Essays ===
- El dedo. Breves apuntes sobre la masturbación femenina (Capitán Swing, 2016)
- El coloquio de las perras (Capitán Swing, 2019)
- Caliente (Lumen, 2021)
- Leer mata (La Caja Books, 2022)
- Incensurable (Lumen, 2025)

=== Theatre ===
- Ternura y derrota (CNTC, 2021)

=== Children's literature ===
- Hazme volar (La Galera, 2019)

=== Short fiction ===
- Exhumación, with Antonio J. Rodríguez (Alpha Decay, 2010)
