= Katya Sambuca =

Russian singer, actress and model (born 1991)

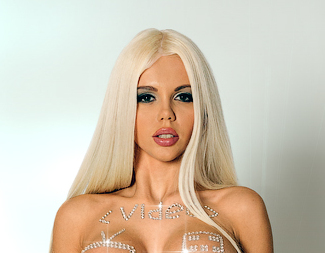
- Sambuca in 2013
- Born: Yekaterina Mikhailova; August 27, 1991 (age 35); Leningrad, Russian SFSR, Soviet Union
- Occupations: Singer; Actress; Model; Television presenter
- Years active: 2010–present
- Spouse: Sergei Mikhailov (m. 2007; sep. 2015)
- Children: 1
- Modeling information
- Height: 1.71 m (5 ft 7 in)
- Hair color: Blond
- Eye color: Green

Katya Sambuca (born Yekaterina Mikhailova, August 27, 1991) is a Russian television presenter, erotic model, singer, and actress.

== Early life and education ==
Katya was born in St Petersburg. Her father was a construction worker, while her mother was a former gymnast. She has Estonian heritage from her maternal grandmother. At age 15, Katya was used as the model for a girls' doll, "Bobby", manufactured in London. After leaving school she trained as a cook. While working in a St Petersburg restaurant she met Mick Jagger of the Rolling Stones, who told her to swap cooking for modelling and invited her to come to America with him.

== Personal life ==
Katya was given the name "Sambuca" by Bob Jack (real name Sergei Mikhailov), whom she married at the age of 16. In 2015, Katya left Bob and she is raising their common daughter Zvana alone.

== Career ==
In 2011 Sambuca and her husband took her erotic show, which featured her house and trap music, on tour, and performed in more than 70 cities across Europe. She became one of the most searched entertainers on Russia's search engine Yandex, and appeared on the covers of XXL (Ukraine) and Qoqo (Estonia, the successor to the Estonian edition of Playboy).

In 2013, she became a co-host on the technology show Trendy Device, broadcast on Russia's 2×2 channel.

In August 2014, Sambuca started a family counseling charity in the Estonian town of Haapsalu, where she lives. She offered the President and his wife free marriage counseling after footage emerged of the First Lady in an intimate situation with another man.

Sambuca is a flautist and has performed as part of a professional orchestra.

=== Trial with Philipp Plein ===
In 2014, the German designer Philipp Plein used Sambuca's nude modelling shots, obtained without permission, in a line of t-shirts, which prompted her to threaten legal action.

=== Haapsalu statue ===
In December 2014, the Moscow sculptor Alexander Wroblewski created a bronze statue of the little mermaid using Sambuca as inspiration. 125 cm tall and weighing 175 kg, Sambuca donated it to the town of Haapsalu, suggesting that it could boost the tourism industry. The mayor ruled out the proposed location, on the promenade near to Tchaikovsky's memorial, as inappropriate, but added that another place could be found. Sambuca also wishes to build hotels, shops, and a water park to boost the town's reputation as a resort.

== Filmography ==
Year	Title	Role
2012	Silicone	cameo
2016	Egor Shilov	Trofim's wife

== Awards ==
- Most Beautiful Girl of VKontakte (2011)
- Girl of the Year in XXL (2012)
- Girl of the Year in Playboy/Qoqo (2012)
- Special Award of the Barcelona Erotic Show Klic-Klic, FICEB (2013)
