= Cecilia Gessa =

Spanish actress

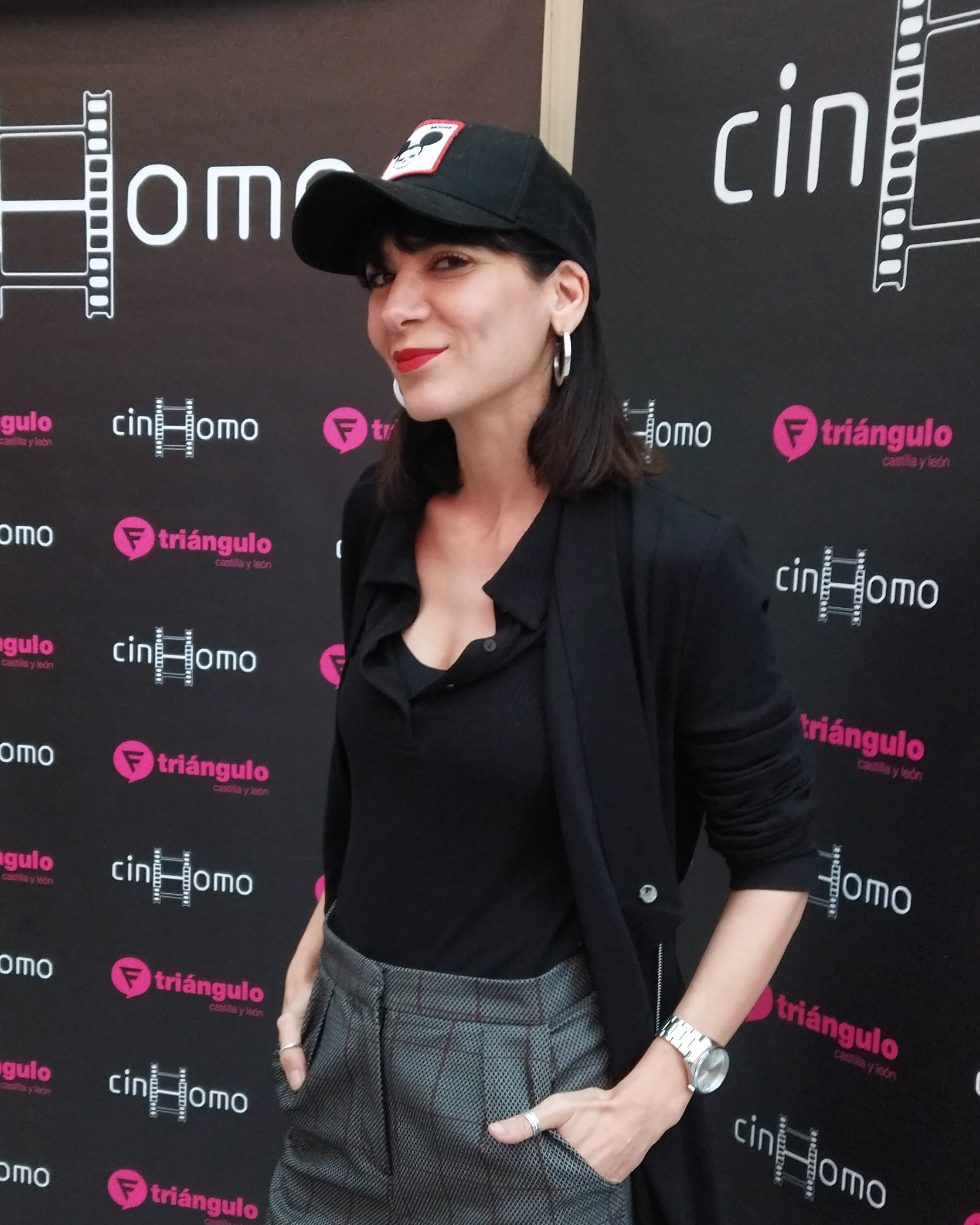
- Born: 22 November 1977 (age 48)
- Website: www.ceciliagessa.com

Cecilia Gessa (Madrid, November 22, 1977), is a Spanish actress, director, screenwriter and producer.

== Career Path ==
=== Early career ===
Cecilia Gessa was born in Madrid in 1977. She comes from a family of artists: her father Fernando Gessa is a writer, her grandmother Fina Gessa was an actress, and her great-grandfather Sebastián Gessa y Arias was a famous painter.

In 2001, under the name Celia Blanco, she began her career in the audiovisual industry, including adult films, a stage she abandoned in 2007 to focus on mainstream cinema.

In 2002, she received the Linda Chacón Awad for recognition of women's professional work as a film producer and director.

She was trained in Estudio Recabarren, a school of film and television acting operating in Madrid. Upon matriculating, she studied under the renowned Spanish director Yayo Cáceres, leader of the theater company Ron Lalá, and was a member of the theatre company Simpañía. She was mentored in singing and dancing by Óscar Mingorance, Karen Taff and received further acting training with Jo Kelly.

=== Film career ===
In 2000, she began working with the film producer and director Ramiro Lapiedra, under the pseudonym Celia Blanco. The following year, they obtained financing for her first feature film titled The Panther Woman, inspired by the horror film Cat People (1942) directed by Jacques Tourneur. After this production, Ella Gessa signed an exclusive contract with the distributor Elephant Channel and made a series of films until 2004, when she left the adult film industry. In 2006, she was the godmother of the I Madrid Erotic Festival. In parallel, Gessa also became known to the general public with her pseudonym Celia Blanco by participating in television programs such as Crónicas marcianas, directed by Javier Sardà on Telecinco.[8] Due to her presence as a collaborator in television programs

On cinema, she has taken part in the collective film Sequence, sponsored by Montxo Armendariz (included in the short-film "Vigilantes" of Hermanos Prada).

On television, she appeared in series such as "Impares", "Bicho Malo" and "RIS Científica" In theatre she has taken part, among others, in plays such as "El Comedor" directed by Eduardo Recabarren; "El diario de Ana Frank" directed by Daniel Gacía; "¿Está ocupada esta silla?" and "Todo a su tiempo, cósmico" directed both of them by Max Lemcke; and "¡Ay, que me viene!" directed by Carlos Bardem. She combines her work as actress with the direction and management of Gessas' Events Company. In 2009, she was awarded in Colombia with the Zootropo Prize as the best actress.

In 2010, she began a relationship with the actor Carlos Bardem. In 2016 she joined the cast of La_embajada (Antena 3) where she played Lucía Cárdenas, wife of Paco Cárdenas (Carlos Bardem).

She also had notable roles in the 2018 Netflix series Paquita Salas and in the 2020 La 1 comedy series about the COVID-19 pandemic lockdown, Diarios de la cuarentena.
