= Luca Damiano =

Italian film director (born 1946)

- Born: Franco Lo Cascio; 29 August 1946 (age 79); Rome
- Occupation: Film director
- Notable work: Ah sì? E io lo dico a Zzzzorro!

Luca Damiano (born Franco Lo Cascio; 29 August 1946) is an Italian film director.

Born in Rome, Lo Cascio started his career as the assistant director of Fernando Di Leo in almost all the films he directed between 1967 and 1974. In 1974, he made his directorial debut with the parody film Piedino il questurino starring Franco Franchi.

After having directed a number of comedies and the supernatural thriller Un urlo dalle tenebre in 1976, Lo Cascio withdrew from directing to focus on his distribution company "Patrizia Cinematografica" he founded together with Diego Spadaro. In 1984, he adopted his stage name Luca Damiano and directed and produced numerous pornographic films.

== Awards and nominations ==
- 2000 FICEB Ninfa Award winner – Lifetime Achievement Award
- 2001 FICEB Ninfa Award winner – Special Jury Award

== Partial filmography ==
- Piedino il questurino (1974)
- Un urlo dalle tenebre (1975)
- Mark of Zorro (1975)
- Sesso allo specchio (1981)
- Erotic Adventures of Red Riding Hood (1986)
- La Signora dell'Oriente Express (1989)
- Il Marchese de Sade – Oltre ogni perversione (1994)
- Ladri gentiluomini – Donne, gioielli... e culi belli (1994)
- The Erotic Adventures of Marco Polo (1994)
- The Erotic Adventures of Aladdin X (1994)
- Hamlet: For the Love of Ophelia (1995)
- Snow White & 7 Dwarfs (1995)
- War Games (1996)
- Napoleon (1996)
- Orient Express (1996)
- The Princess, the Bodyguard and the Stripper (1996)
- C'era una volta il... bordello (1997)
- Rock Erotic Picture Show (1997)
- Don Juan (1998)
- Paolina Borghese ninfomane imperiale (1998)
- Snow White... Ten Years Later (1999)
- Penocchio (2002)
