= Sebastián Gessa y Arias =

Spanish painter (1840–1920)

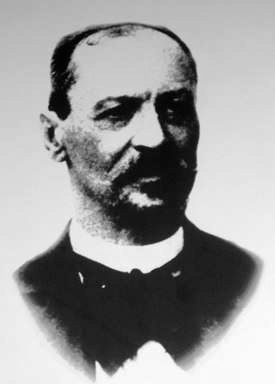
Sebastián Gessa y Arias (date unknown)

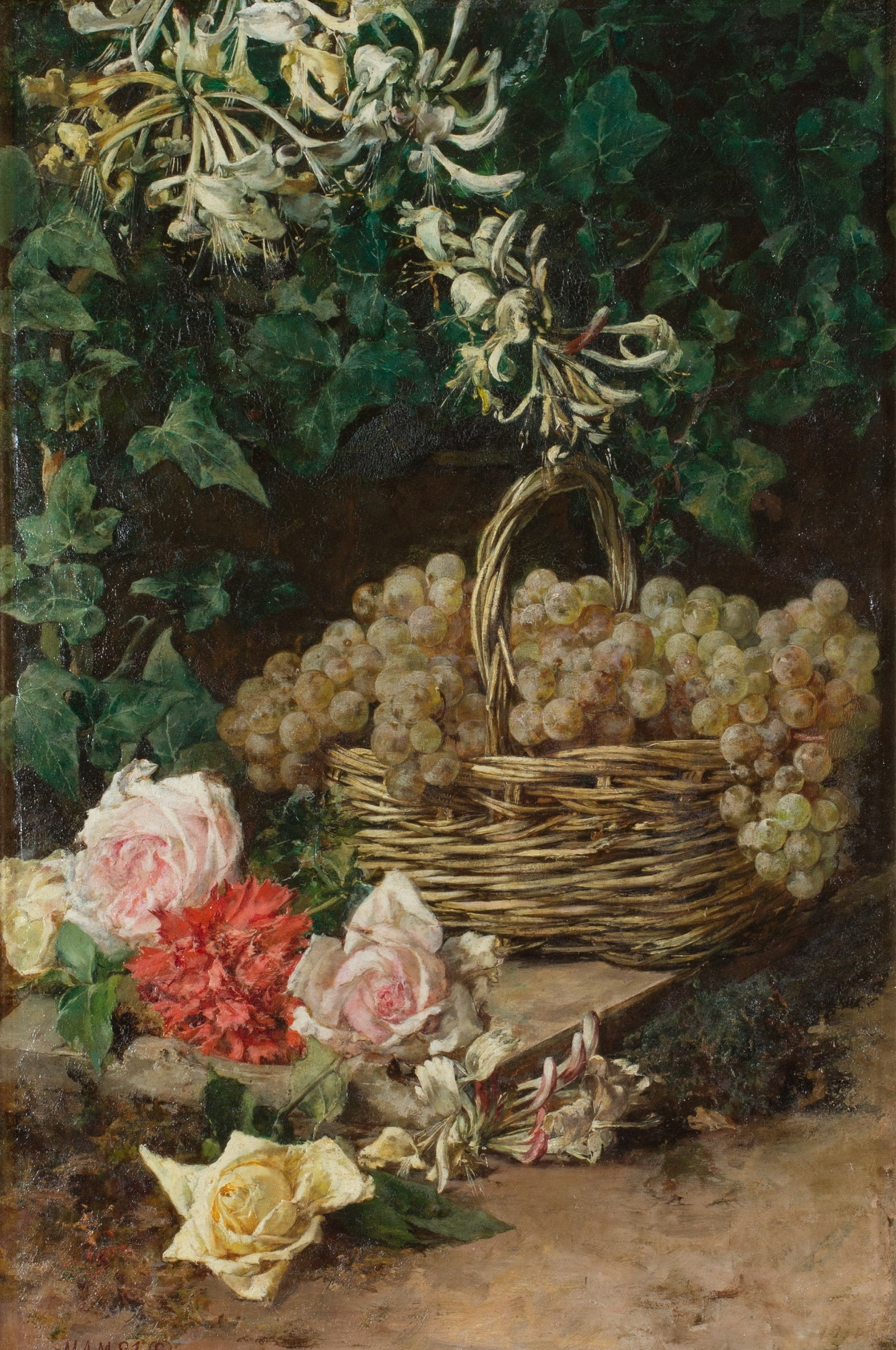
Flowers and Fruits, 1897

Sebastián Gessa y Arias (8 May 1840, Chiclana de la Frontera - 9 January 1920, San Agustín del Guadalix) was a Spanish painter; known as El pintor de las flores, for his dedication to floral themes, bodegones and still-lifes.

== Biography ==
He began his studies at the Escuela de Bellas Artes de Cádiz then, in 1864, received a scholarship that enabled him to study in Paris. There, he enrolled at the École nationale supérieure des Beaux-Arts, where he studied with Alexandre Cabanel. He would remain in Paris until 1870. During that time, he participated in several exhibitions; notably the Exposition Universelle (1867).

When he returned to Spain, he settled in Madrid, where he made a name for himself by the decorative work he performed at the Palacio de Linares, home of José de Murga y Reolid, the Marqués de Linares. Much of this work was floral in nature and set the tone for his career.

In 1881, he was awarded a gold medal at the Exposición Regional de Cádiz and presented his first entry at the National Exhibition of Fine Arts. He was awarded a Third Class medal at the Exposition Universelle (1889). His greatest success came in 1897, at the National Exhibition, when he was awarded a First Class prize for his work "Flowers and Fruits". This was the first time that top honors had been given to a bodegón, rather than one of the dramatic historical or mythological scenes the jurors had favored up to that point.

Several well known painters were trained in his workshop, including Fernanda Frances Arribas, Marcelina Poncela Hontoria, Julia Alcayde y Montoya and Adela Ginés y Ortiz, his favorite student, with whom he lived, after becoming financially distressed. Her death from pneumonia, in 1918, left him destitute.

His works may be seen at the Museo del Prado, Museo de Cádiz, Museo de Bellas Artes de Murcia, Museo Nacional de Bellas Artes (Argentina), and several private collections, such as the Colección Bellver in Seville.
