= Nacho Vidal =

Spanish pornographic actor

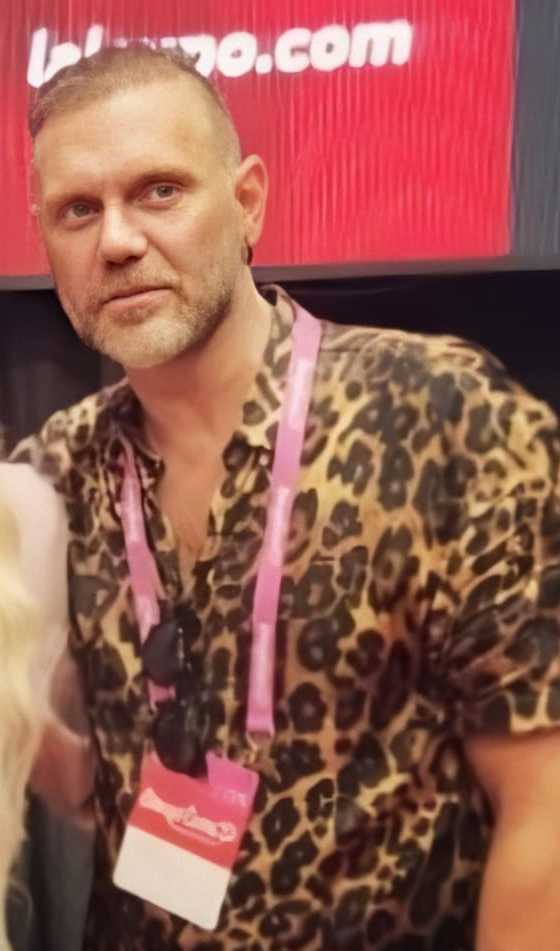
- Vidal in 2020
- Born: Ignacio Jordà González; 30 December 1973 (age 52); Mataró, Barcelona, Spain
- Occupations: Adult performer; director; producer; writer; editor
- Years active: 1997–present
- Height: 1.82 m (6 ft 0 in)
- Spouse: Franceska Jaimes (2005–2015)
- Children: 3
- Website: nachovidal.com

Ignacio Jordà González (born 30 December 1973), better known as Nacho Vidal, is a Spanish pornographic actor and director.

== Early life ==
Ignacio Jordà González was born on 30 December 1973 in Mataró (Barcelona) in Catalonia. His nickname Nacho is the common nickname for Ignacio.

When he was young, Jordà moved with his family to Valencia, where part of his family originated. According to Nacho Vidal, his family was wealthy, had textile factories and extensive real estate assets, but ended up losing their wealth due to 1970s energy crisis, and at 14, he quit school to work and help his family.

As a teenager, he was in a punk band. He also was a boxer and enlisted in the Spanish Legion in Melilla.

== Career ==
In 1994, Vidal started his porn career doing live sex shows with his girlfriend, Sara Bernat (born 1976), at the Sala Bagdad in Barcelona. There, he met the director of the Barcelona International Erotic Film Festival, José María Ponce, who introduced him to porn films. Vidal became a protégé of Rocco Siffredi, who brought him to Hollywood in 1998.

Vidal has starred in over 1,500 movies; he has also produced and/or directed many others (since 2000, including gay titles for the Evil Angel video company). Although self-stated as heterosexual, he has directed gay porn films.

Vidal has starred in Spanish mainstream movies and TV shows, including the Spanish TV series Los Simuladores and the Spanish movies Va a ser que nadie es perfecto, El Alquimista Impaciente and Impávido.

The 8-part Spanish-language TV series Nacho describes Vidal's life and was released in Spain and Latin America in March 2023, with Vidal being portrayed by Martiño Rivas.

Recently Nacho has moved into the director's chair, helming his own shot-in-Europe line called "Killer Pussy". He directs and stars in the flicks, bringing audiences the cream of the crop of current European sex stars. The series has already won accolades, as Nacho's ravenous romp with Czech beauty Helen in Killer Pussy (2000), which garnered an AVN nomination for Best Sex Scene in a Foreign Release.

== Personal life ==
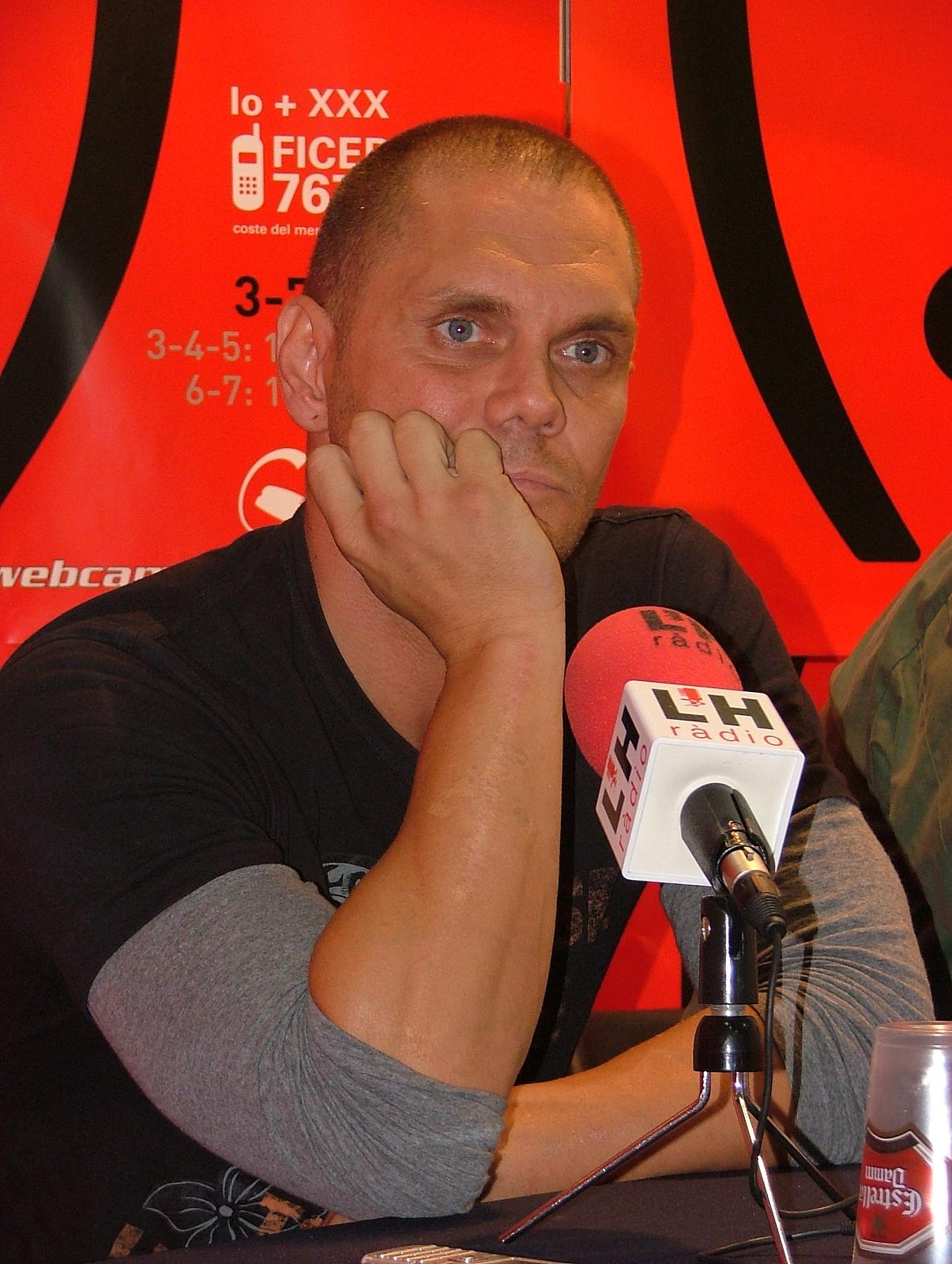
Nacho Vidal in 2007

Vidal has stated that he is "open-minded", but is heterosexual in his personal life. He had his first daughter with Venezuelan Rosa Castro Camacho.

On 31 May 2005, Vidal announced his retirement from pornography and married Colombian model Franceska Jaimes. They moved to a mansion previously owned by his family, located in the small town of Enguera, in Valencia, recovering it after his family's financial losses. He and his wife decided to start a family there. However, the couple separated six weeks later, and Vidal returned to porn only a few months after announcing his retirement. They have two children, and divorced in 2015.

In February 2019, a Spanish newspaper stated that Nacho Vidal is HIV-positive. Later that year, in a 12-minute YouTube video, he clarified that his test was a false positive. He found after visits to a series of doctors that he has reactive arthritis, a highly painful, sometimes chronic or lifelong condition. This inflammatory syndrome is often triggered by a prior, treatable infection which may itself resolve (be healed). In Vidal's case, he explains, it was repeated infections by the STDs chlamydia and gonorrhea contracted during his sex work, each instance having been quickly treated and cured. Because of the disease he cannot work and is seeking disability benefits.

In 2019, Vidal, Jaimes, and their daughter were portrayed in the documentary Me llamo Violeta.

== Legal problems ==
On 16 October 2012, Vidal and his sister María José Jordá González were arrested in Barcelona, suspected of involvement in money laundering and tax evasion on behalf of Chinese organized crime. When Spanish police raided over 100 businesses in Madrid and Barcelona suspected of running money-laundering and tax evasion rackets in connection with the Chinese mob, Vidal and his sister were among the approximately 80 detained. Hundreds of police were involved in serving "warrants to search 120 properties belonging to those suspected of laundering money from prostitution and extortion."

While prosecutors sought to hold Vidal in jail during the investigation and subsequent trial, on 19 October 2012, National Court Judge Fernando Andreu accepted the defense's contention that, "Vidal is not a flight risk because he signed a contract to participate in a reality show for the next three months." Upon his no-bail release, Vidal announced, "Thanks to everyone for their support. I've gone without any charge."

Vidal's movie studio Nacho Vidal Productions was implicated in the Spanish National Court-led sting, and charged with counts of flight of capital and tax evasion. The newspaper El País described Vidal as "one of the high[est]-profile suspects arrested" and explained that he was accused along with his sister of helping the ring "by issuing false invoices from his movie production company."

On 4 June 2020, Vidal was arrested on manslaughter charges in relation to the death of a fashion photographer, José Luis Abad, in July 2019. Abad died as a result of inhaling vapors from the venom of a Colorado River toad in Vidal's home in Enguera, in a traditional Amazonian ritual in which Vidal is alleged to have acted as shaman. Vidal was arrested together with two other unnamed individuals, a member of his family and an employee. A different news story says the death was from heart attack; the crime was not promptly calling in medical assistance.

In March 2021, Spanish authorities officially charged Vidal with reckless homicide in the death of Abad following an 11-month investigation. According to court statements, Vidal acted as "the director" of the ritual and had previous experience in taking the toxin. Vidal allegedly supplied the toxin and failed to properly control the amount the victim inhaled during the ceremony. The charges were dismissed in 2023.

== Awards and nominations ==
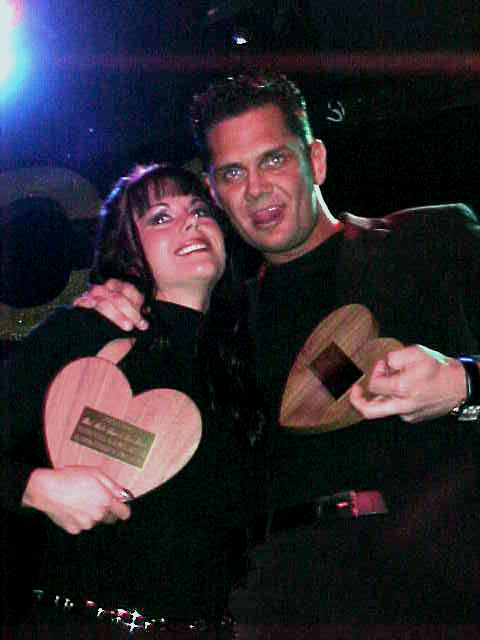
Vidal and Jewel De'Nyle holding their XRCO Award trophies for Best Male-Female Sex Scene in 2001

- 2013 XBIZ Award winner - Best Scene - Gonzo/Non-Feature Release (Nacho Invades America 2 - Nacho Vidal/Evil Angel) with Chanel Preston
- 2012 XBIZ Award winner – Foreign Male Performer of the Year
- 2012 AVN Hall of Fame inductee
- 2009 Hot d'Or Award winner - Best European Male Performer
- 2008 Ninfa Award winner - Best Actor (Public) and Most Original Sex Scene (The Fashionistas Safado Berlin 1 with Katsuni & Melissa Lauren)
- 2006 Ninfa Award winner - Best Actor
- 2004 Ninfa Award winner - Best Transvestite Film (Travestís dominados por Nacho - International film grup)
- 2004 AVN Award - Best Couples Sex Scene - Video
- 2004 AVN Award - Best Group Sex Scene - Video
- 2003 Ninfa Award winner - Best Actor (Back 2 Evil - International Film Grup)
- 2002 Ninfa Award winner - Best Actor (Public)
- 2002 AVN Award - Best Actor (Video)
- 2002 AVN Award - Male Performer of the Year
- 2001 AVN Award - Best Sex Scene in a Foreign Release
- 2001 AVN Award - Male Foreign Performer of the Year
- 2001 XRCO Award - Best Threeway Sex Scene
- 2001 XRCO Award – Best Male-Female Sex Scene (Xxxtreme Fantasies Of Jewel De'Nyle) with Jewel De'Nyle
- 2001 Ninfa Award winner - Best Actor (Face Dance Obsession)
- 2000 AVN Award - Best Sex Scene in a Foreign Release
- 2000 Ninfa Award winner - Best Sex Scene (Brazilian Butt Fest - International Film Grup) with Cassandra & Jazmine
- 2000 Ninfa Award winner - Best Actor (Buttman's Anal Divas - International Film Grup)
