= Herschel Savage =

American pornographic actor, director and stage actor (1952–2023)

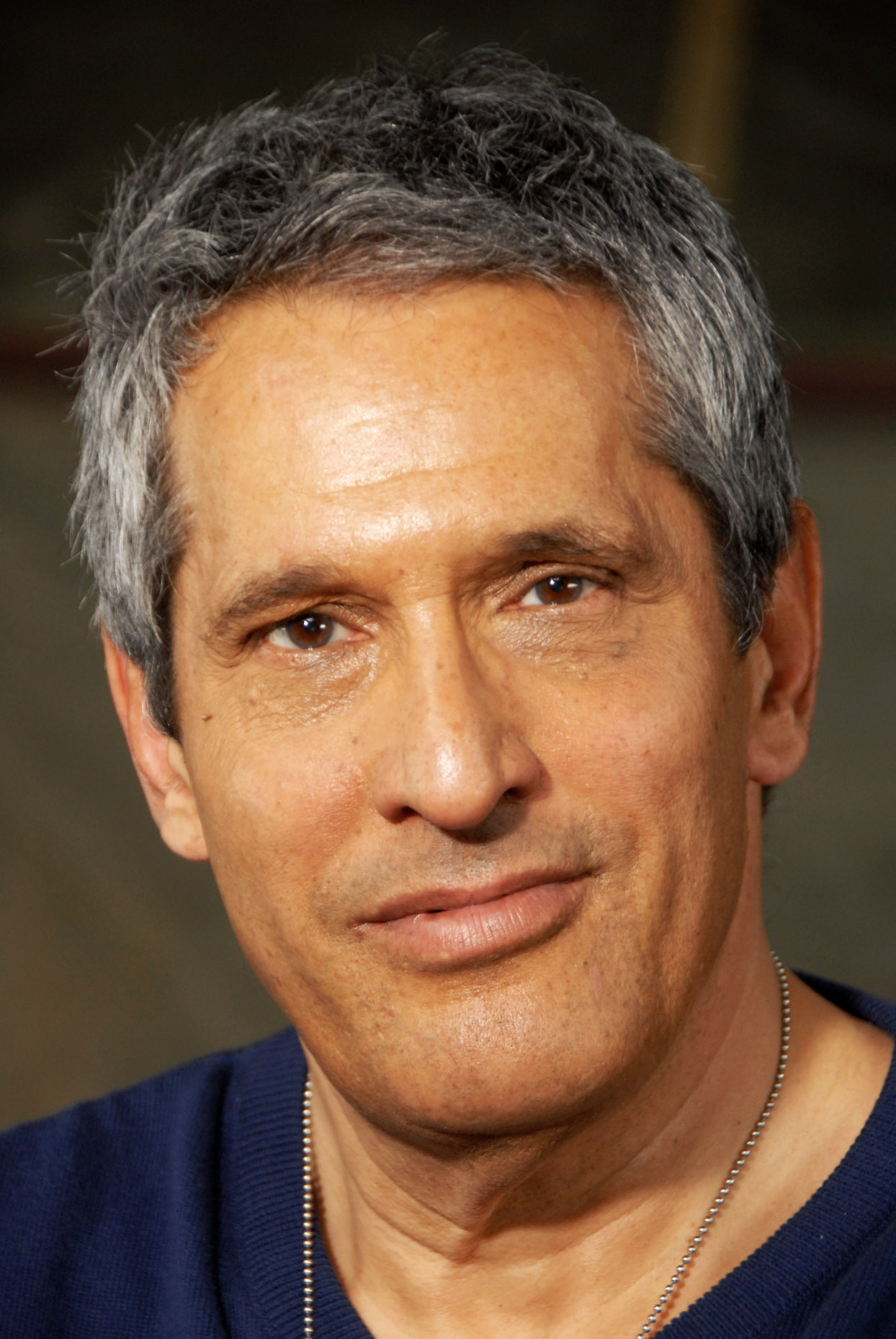
- Savage in 2010
- Born: Harvey Cohen; November 25, 1952; New York City, New York, U.S.
- Died: October 8, 2023 (aged 70); Los Angeles, California, U.S.
- Other names: Harvey Cowen, Harvey Joel Coen, Herschel Cohen, Jack Black, Max Cohen
- Height: 6 ft 2 in (1.88 m)

Herschel Savage (born Harvey Cohen, November 25, 1952 – October 8, 2023) was an American pornographic actor, director, and stage actor who appeared in over 1,000 adult films. In 2002, AVN ranked him 46th on their list of The Top 50 Porn Stars of All Time. He was also inducted into the AVN and XRCO Halls of Fame.

== Early life ==
Herschel Savage was born as Harvey Cohen on November 25, 1952, in New York City, to Russian-Jewish parents. His mother battled with obsessive-compulsive disorder. Growing up, he attended a Conservative synagogue. Savage saw his first adult film The Nun's Bad Habit at a movie theater in Times Square.

Savage began studying acting under Broadway theatre actress Uta Hagen and renowned acting teacher Stella Adler. Savage initially sought a mainstream stage and screen career. However, he became disillusioned by the constant auditioning and competition for roles. He also worked for an exercise company.

== Career ==
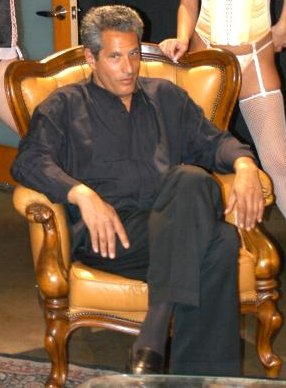
Savage in 2006

Savage was introduced to the adult film industry via the actor R. Bolla in 1976. He went on to become one of the biggest stars of the "Golden Age of Porn" in the 1970s and 1980s. Savage appeared in the 1978 classic Debbie Does Dallas, for which he was paid about $150 a day. The film was a financial success, becoming one of the top five highest grossing adult films of all time. Some of the other films he appeared in include Expose Me Now, Bodies in Heat, and Rambone Does Hollywood. He created the stage name "Herschel Savage" with adult actor Jamie Gillis in an attempt to combine a 'nerdy Jewish identity' with that of a stud.

During the mid-1980s, Savage helped to organize sex workers in San Francisco to fight for better wages. The initiative was ultimately abandoned after production studios threatened to blacklist performers. In 1986, Savage appeared in a cameo for the neo-noir crime film 52 Pick-Up starring Roy Scheider and Ann-Margret. He was credited as "Harvey Cowen". In 1988, Savage was inducted into the XRCO Hall of Fame. That same year, he left pornography to work in sales and video distribution. He returned to performing in 1997.

Savage appeared as a guest during the fifth season of the NBC sitcom Just Shoot Me, with Ron Jeremy, which aired on February 1, 2001. In 2003, he performed a stand-up routine on an episode of the reality television series Family Business. Savage portrayed a detective in the 2008 parody film The Texas Vibrator Massacre. He appeared alongside other adult performers in the documentary series After Porn Ends 3 in 2018. Savage appeared in more than 1000 adult films. He was also inducted into the AVN Hall of Fame.

=== Stage ===
Savage performed under the name "Max Cohen" in a 2006 production of Neil Simon's The Prisoner of Second Avenue. In January 2013, he portrayed pornographic film director Gerard Damiano in the Los Angeles production of The Deep Throat Sex Scandal, a play described as the "theatrical telling of the back story of Deep Throat." His performance drew positive reviews. Writing for The Los Angeles Times, Charlotte Stoudt called Savage's portrayal of Damiano "surprisingly cogent". Myron Meisel from The Hollywood Reporter remarked that he "engenders endearing empathy as the amiably deluded director Damiano." Steven Leigh Morris from LA Weekly deemed his performance "dramatic comedy terra firma". Savage credited the play with "renewing [his] love for performing on stage."

Savage appeared as himself in Pretty Filthy, a musical about the adult film industry. He also performed in the interactive dinner show Joni and Gina's Wedding. In July 2016, Savage premiered Porn Star: My Life In The Sex Industry, an autobiographical one-man show, which he successfully funded through a Kickstarter campaign.

== Personal life and death ==
Savage was a practicing Buddhist. He resided in California.

Herschel Savage died on October 8, 2023, at the age of 70.

== Select performances ==
=== Film ===
| Title | Year | Role | Notes | Ref. |
|---|---|---|---|---|
| Debbie Does Dallas | 1978 | Tim | | |
| The Satisfiers of Alpha Blue | 1980 | Griffin | | |
| Memphis Cathouse Blues | 1982 | Deacon Davis | | |
| What Gets Me Hot! | 1984 | Mrs. Radner's Boyfriend | | |
| 52 Pick-Up | 1986 | Party Goer | Credited as Harvey Cowen | |
| Droid | 1988 | Turk | | |
| LA 399 | 1999 | Alejandro Biscotti | | |
| Last Breath | 2000 | Mary's Husband | | |
| The Texas Vibrator Massacre | 2008 | Detective Mike Roe | | |
| 30 Rock: A XXX Parody | 2009 | Jake | | |
| After Porn Ends 3 | 2018 | Himself | Documentary | |

=== Television ===
| Title | Year | Role | Notes | Ref. |
|---|---|---|---|---|
| Sex Court | 1999-00 | Tommy Rawlings / Nick Palos / Tony Tornelli | 3 episodes | |
| Just Shoot Me! | 2001 | Ron | Episode: "The Proposal" | |
| Family Business | 2003 | Himself | Episode: "Casa De Butts" | |
| Are You There, Chelsea? | 2012 | Guard | Episode: "Pilot" (credited as Harvey Joel Coen) | |
| Dave's Old Porn | 2012 | Himself | Episode: "Lisa Lampanelli / Herschel Savage" | |

=== Theater ===
| Title | Year | Venue | Role | Notes | Ref. |
|---|---|---|---|---|---|
| The Prisoner of Second Avenue | 2006 | | Mel Edison | Lead role (credited as Max Cohen) | |
| The Deep Throat Sex Scandal | 2013 | Zephyr Theater | Gerard Damiano | Los Angeles run | |
| Pretty Filthy | 2015 | Abrons Arts Center | Himself | Musical | |
| Porn Star: My Life In The Sex Industry | 2016 | Beyond Baroque Literary Arts Center | Himself | One-man show | |

== Awards ==
List of accolades received by Herschel Savage
Awards and nominations
| Award | Won | Nominated |
| AVN Awards | 7 | 36 |
| NightMoves Awards | 0 | 1 |
| XBIZ Awards | 0 | 2 |
| XRCO Awards | 2 | 1 |
- Total number of wins and nominations
| Totals | 9 | 40 |

AVN Awards
| Year | Nominated work and artist | Category | Result | Ref. |
|---|---|---|---|---|
| 1987 | If Only Mother Knew | Best Supporting Actor | Nominated | |
| 1989 | Amanda by Night II | Best Sex Scene - Feature Film (with Nina Hartley) | Won | |
| 1992 | Herschel Savage | AVN Hall of Fame Inductee | Won | |
| 2000 | The Devil Made Her Do It | Most Outrageous Sex Scene (with Mila & Dave Hardman) | Won | |
| 2000 | Herschel Savage | Male Performer of the Year | Nominated | |
| 2000 | The Kissing Game | Best Couples Sex Scene - Video (with Missy) | Nominated | |
| 2000 | The Kissing Game | Best Supporting Actor - Video | Nominated | |
| 2000 | Nothing to Hide 3 & 4 | Best Actor - Film | Nominated | |
| 2000 | Trial by Copulation | Best Group Sex Scene - Film (with Temptress, Azlea Antistia, and Chris Cannon) | Nominated | |
| 2000 | The Trophy | Best Supporting Actor - Film | Nominated | |
| 2000 | Tushy Con Carne | Best Anal Sex Scene - Video (with Alisha Klass) | Nominated | |
| 2001 | Dream Quest | Best Actor - Film | Nominated | |
| 2001 | Exhibitionist Part 1 | Best Supporting Actor - Video | Nominated | |
| 2001 | The Gapes of Wrath | Best Anal Sex Scene - Video (with McKayla Matthews, Tyce Bune, and Mark Davis) | Nominated | |
| 2001 | Screamers | Best Couples Sex Scene - Film (with Dee) | Nominated | |
| 2001 | Screamers | Best Supporting Actor - Film | Nominated | |
| 2001 | Sodomania: Gangbang Edition | Best Group Sex Scene - Video (with Sabrina Johnson, Tyce Bune, Lexington Steele, and Mark Anthony) | Nominated | |
| 2001 | Spellbound | Best Actor - Video | Nominated | |
| 2001 | White Trash Whore 17 | Best Anal Sex Scene - Video (with Allysin Embers & Dave Hardman) | Nominated | |
| 2002 | Bad Wives 2 | Best Group Sex Scene - Film (with Kylie Ireland & Jason McCain) | Nominated | |
| 2002 | Infidelity | Best Supporting Actor - Video | Nominated | |
| 2002 | Mafioso | Best Actor - Film | Nominated | |
| 2002 | Pussy Face | Most Outrageous Sex Scene (with Kristen Kane and Rafe) | Won | |
| 2002 | Succubus | Best Group Sex Scene - Video (with Ava Vincent, Bridgette Kerkove, Nikita Denise, and Trevor) | Won | |
| 2002 | Taken | Best Anal Sex Scene - Film | Nominated | |
| 2002 | Taken | Best Supporting Actor - Film | Won | |
| 2003 | Big Bottom Sadie | Best Supporting Actor - Video | Nominated | |
| 2004 | Roommate From Hell | Best Actor - Video | Nominated | |
| 2004 | The Contortionist | Best Supporting Actor - Video | Nominated | |
| 2005 | The Hitman | Best Supporting Actor - Video | Nominated | |
| 2005 | Love and Bullets | Best Actor - Video | Nominated | |
| 2006 | Dark Side | Best Actor - Film | Nominated | |
| 2006 | Dark Side | Best Couples Sex Scene - Film (with Penny Flame) | Won | |
| 2006 | House of Ass | Best Three-Way Sex Scene (with Mari Possa & Barbara Summer) | Nominated | |
| 2007 | Butt Pirates of the Caribbean | Best Group Sex Scene - Video (with Mari Possa, Amber Peach, Samantha Ryan, and Kurt Lockwood) | Nominated | |
| 2007 | ClusterFuck 5 | Best Group Sex Scene - Video (with Mayhem, Tory Lane, Jay Lassiter, Dirty Harry, Scott Lyons, Jenner, Rick Masters, Chris Mountain, Steve james, Trevor Thompson, and Alec Knight) | Nominated | |
| 2007 | Game | Best Non-Sex Performance | Nominated | |
| 2007 | Rumour Had 'Em | Best Supporting Actor - Video | Nominated | |
| 2008 | Delilah | Best Actor - Video | Nominated | |
| 2008 | Spunk'd the Movie | Best Supporting Actor - Video | Nominated | |
| 2009 | The Texas Vibrator Massacre | Best Non-Sex Performance | Nominated | |
| 2010 | 30 Rock: A XXX Parody | Best Actor | Nominated | |
| 2013 | Dallas: A XXX Parody | Best Non-Sex Performance | Nominated | |

NightMoves Awards
| Year | Nominated artist | Category | Result | Ref. |
|---|---|---|---|---|
| 2007 | Herschel Savage | Best Actor | Nominated | |

XBIZ Awards
| Year | Nominated work | Category | Result | Ref. |
|---|---|---|---|---|
| 2010 | 30 Rock: A XXX Parody | Acting Performance of the Year - Male | Nominated | |
| 2019 | Fallen II: Angels & Demons | Best Non-Sex Performance | Nominated | |

XRCO Awards
| Year | Nominated work and artist | Category | Result | Ref. |
|---|---|---|---|---|
| 1988 | Herschel Savage | XRCO Hall of Fame Inductee | Won | |
| 2000 | Nothing to Hide 3 & 4 | Actor (Single Performance) | Nominated | |
| 2006 | Dark Side (with Penny Flame) | Best Onscreen Couple | Won | |
