= 17th AVN Awards =

US adult industry award ceremony in 2000

- Logo of the 2000 AVN Awards
- Date: January 8, 2000
- Site: The Venetian Las Vegas at Paradise, Nevada, U.S.A.
- Hosted by: Juli Ashton
- Preshow hosts: Chi Chi LaRue; Keri Windsor
- Produced by: Gary Miller
- Directed by: Mark Stone

Highlights
- Best Picture: Seven Deadly Sins (Best Film)
- Most awards: Double Feature! (10)
- Most nominations: Seven Deadly Sins (15)

The 17th AVN Awards ceremony, presented by Adult Video News (AVN), took place January 8, 2000 at the Venetian Hotel Grand Ballroom, at Paradise, Nevada, U.S.A. During the ceremony, AVN presented AVN Awards (often dubbed the "Academy Awards of Porn") in 77 categories honoring the best pornographic films released between Oct. 1, 1998 and Sept. 30, 1999. The ceremony was produced by Gary Miller and directed by Mark Stone. Adult film star Juli Ashton hosted the show.

Double Feature! won 10 awards including Best Director—Video for Jonathan Morgan while the night's other big winner, Seven Deadly Sins captured eight awards including Best Film and Best Director—Film for Ren Savant. Several other movies won two trophies apiece including: Cashmere, Chloe, Dark Garden, Playthings, Search for the Snow Leopard, Tristan Taormino's Ultimate Guide to Anal Sex for Women, What Makes You Cum and When Rocco Meats Kelly 2: In Barcelona.

== Winners and nominees ==
The nominees for the 18th AVN Awards were announced in November 1999. Seven Deadly Sins received the most nominations with 15, followed by Nothing to Hide 3 & 4 with 12 and Double Feature! and The Awakening with 11 apiece.

The winners were announced during the awards ceremony on January 8, 2000. Besides winning Best Actress—Film, Chloe also won or shared in four other awards: Best Solo Sex Scene, Best Anal Sex Scene—Film, Best All-Girl Sex Scene—Video and Best Group Sex Scene—Video. The most sought-after awards, Best New Starlet and Female Performer of the Year, went to Bridgette Kerkove and Inari Vachs respectively. Dark Garden was named best video feature, the fourth time a Michael Ninn-directed feature had won either Best Film or Best Video.

=== Major awards ===
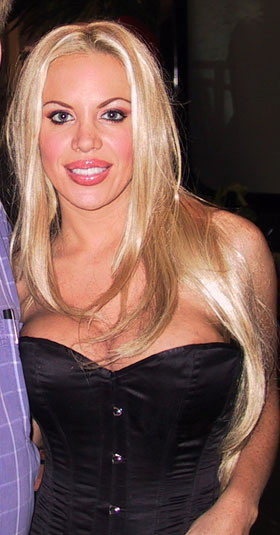
Bridgette Kerkove, Best New Starlet winner

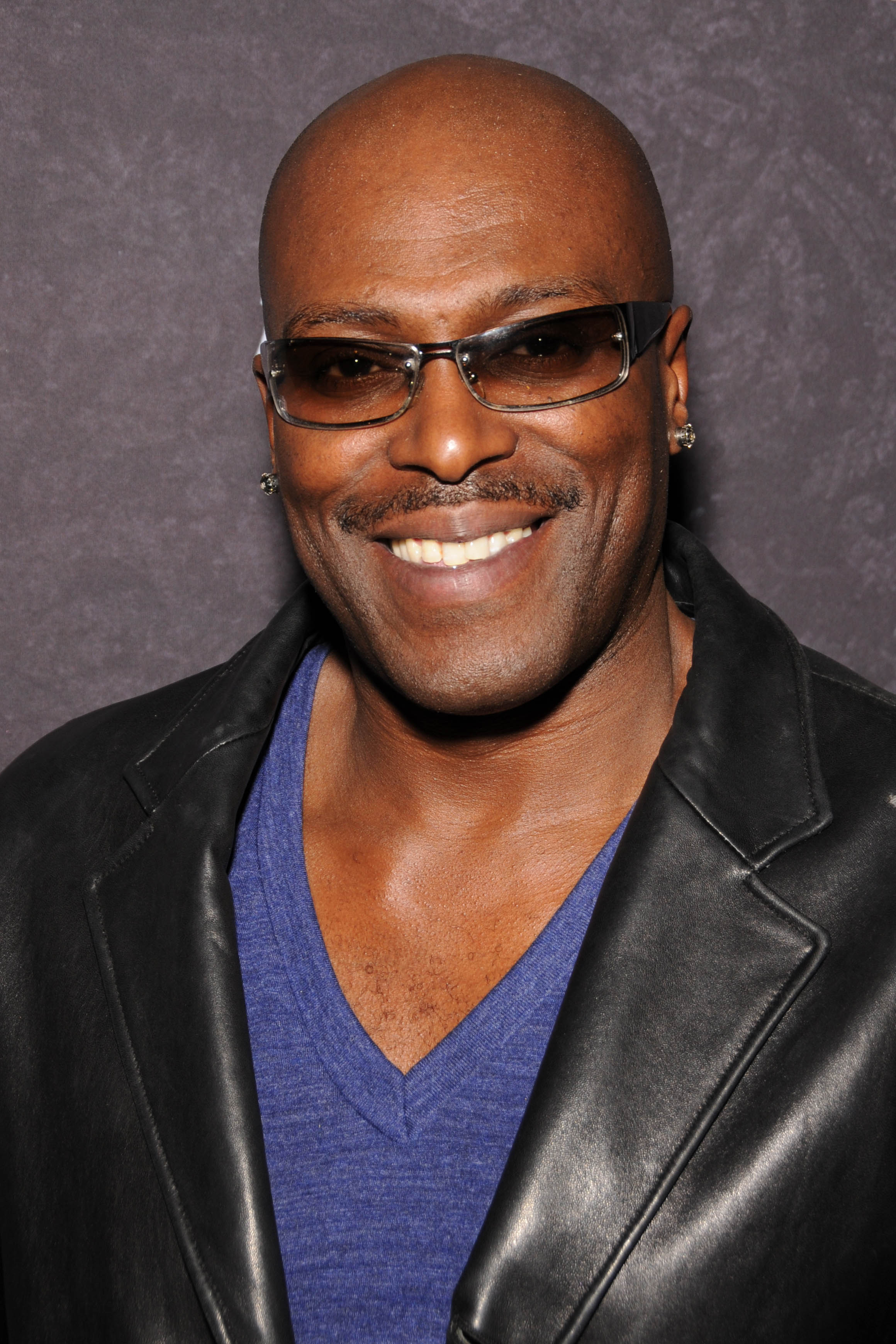
Lexington Steele, Male Performer of the Year winner

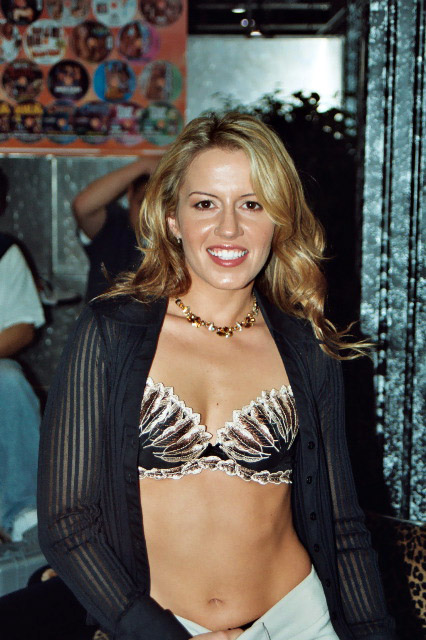
Inari Vachs, Female Performer of the Year

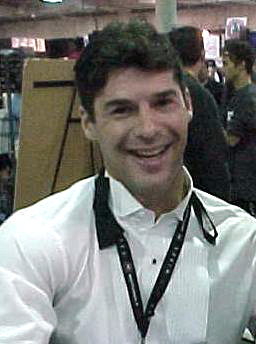
James Bonn, Best Actor—Film winner

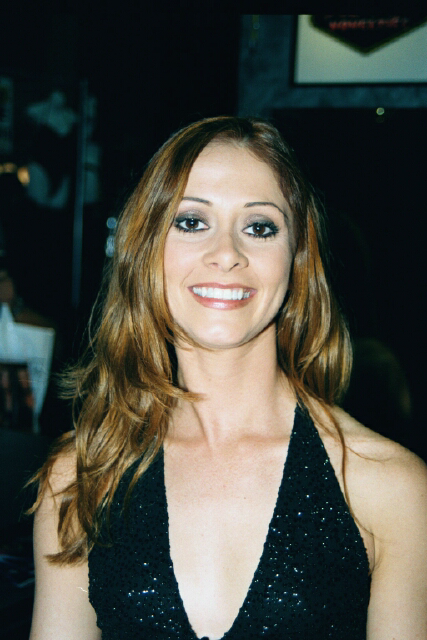
Chloe, Best Actress—Film winner

Winners are listed first, highlighted in boldface, and indicated with a double dagger (‡).

Best Film	Best Video Feature
**Seven Deadly Sins**‡; The Awakening; Chloe; Nothing to Hide 3 & 4; Original Sin; Search For The Snow Leopard; Stray Cats; Talent Scout; Three; Trigger	**Dark Garden**‡; Archer's Last Day; Cashmere; Crossroads; The Devil in Miss Jones 6; Eyes of Desire 2; The Kissing Game; LA 399; Revenge; Serenade; Torn; White Rabbit
Best DVD	Best New Starlet
**Cashmere**‡; Assylum; Big Babies in Budapest; The Devil in Miss Jones 6''; Fatal Orchid; L.A. Uncovered; Painting Pamela; Seven Deadly Sins; Stray Cat; Risque Burlesque 2; Rocki Roads' Wet Dreams; Tatiana 1, 2, & 3	**Bridgett Kerkove**‡; Anastasia Blue; Jewel De'Nyle; India; Katja Kean; Leanni Lei; Bunny Luv; Barrett Moore; Sonja Redd; Regan Starr; Sydnee Steele; Vivian Valentine
Male Performer of the Year	Female Performer of the Year
**Lexington Steele**‡; Chris Cannon; Christoph Clark; Luciano; Mr. Marcus; Sean Michaels; Herschel Savage; Rocco Siffredi; Randy Spears	**Inari Vachs**‡; Chloe; Sabrina Johnson; Alisha Klass; Monique; Raylene; Serenity; Alexandra Silk; Stephanie Swift
Best Actor—Film	Best Actress—Film
**James Bonn, Chloe**‡; John Decker, The Trophy; Mickey G., Taxi Dancer; Mike Horner, In the Flesh; Herschel Savage, Nothing to Hide 3 & 4; Randy Spears, Poseur; Bobby Vitale, Talent Scout	**Chloe, Chloe**‡; Asia Carrera, Search For The Snow Leopard; Allysin Chaynes, Stray Cat; Racquel Darrian, Original Sin; Raylene, The Trophy; Nikki Sinn, Things Change 3; Gwen Summers, Nothing to Hide 3 & 4; Inari Vachs, The Awakening
Best Actor—Video	Best Actress—Video
**Randy Spears, Double Feature!**‡; Brad Armstrong, Knockout; Tyce Buné, Revenge; Tom Byron, Archer's Last Day; Mickey G., Eyes of Desire 2; Mike Horner, Sexplicity; Michael Raven, Mindfuck; Tony Tedeschi, Taboo 18	**Serenity, Double Feature!**‡; Chloe, Taboo 19; Kylie Ireland, Timeless; Katja Kean, Millennium; Ginger Lynn, Torn; Missy, Desperate Measures; Raylene, Manic Behavior; Stephanie Swift, Crossroads
Best Director—Film	Best Director—Video
**Ren Savant, Seven Deadly Sins**‡; James Avalon, Nothing to Hide 3 & 4; Andrew Blake, Playthings; Nic Cramer, Trigger; Kris Kramski, Chloe; Nicholas Orleans, Search For The Snow Leopard; Ralph Parfait, Three; Ed Powers, Tight Shots: The Movie; Paul Thomas, The Awakening; Michael Zen, Things Change 3 & 4	**Jonathan Morgan, Double Feature!**‡; Brad Armstrong, The Kissing Game; Charley Crow, Archer's Last Day; Toshi Gold, Succubus: Skin XVII; Cash Markman, Pleasureville; Michael Ninn, Dark Garden; Antonio Passolini, The Devil In Miss Jones 6; Simon Poe, Windsong; Michael Raven, White Rabbit; Candida Royalle, Eyes of Desire 2; Jane Waters, Return of the Nightstalker; Michael Zen, Taboo 19
Best All-Sex Film	Best All-Sex Video
**Playthings**‡; Daydreamer; Hell on Heels; Pin-Ups; Tropic of Eros	**Voyeur 12**‡; Asswoman: The Rebirth; Fleshpot; Fresh Meat 7; Katja Kean's Sports Spectacular; Porno Playground; Return of the Nightstalker; Slutwoman; Street Meat; Whispers; White Trash Whore 12; Windsong
Top Selling Tape 1999	Top Renting Tape 1999
**The Houston 620**‡	**The Devil in Miss Jones 6**‡
Best Comedy	Best Vignette Tape
**Double Feature!**‡; Chamber of Whores 2: Porn World; Eye Candy Refocused; Hardcore Championship Fucking; Lizzy Borden's Pornoflick; Missionary Position Impossible; Nymph Fever; Pleasureville; Shooting Sex; Tai Blow Job; Tight Shots: The Movie; XXX Trek: The Final Orgasm	**Sodomania 28**‡; Barely Legal; Conflict; Daydream; Just Fuckin' and Suckin' 4; Kelly the Coed 2; Perverted Stories 22; PickUp Lines 34; Pleasure Highway; Porno Playground
Best Anal-Themed Tape	Best Gonzo Video
**Tristan Taormino's Ultimate Guide to Anal Sex for Women**‡; Anal Demonstrative; Assman 9; Caught From Behind 29; Cornhole Armageddon; Only the A Hole 8; Rocco's True Anal Stories 8; Sean Michaels Rocks That Ass 2; Stop My Ass Is On Fire; Tails of Perversity 6; Up Your Ass 12; Young and Anal 14	**Ben Dover's The Booty Bandit**‡; Beach Bunnies With Big Browneyes 5; Cumback Pussy 17; Essentially Shayla; Knocking at Heaven's Back Door; Max World 17; "Please!" 2; Pornological 3; Return of the Cumm Brothers; Whack Attack 3; World Sex Tour 17
Hot Video Award (Best U.S. Release in Europe)	Best Foreign Vignette Tape
**Eros**‡; Cashmere; Delirious; The Devil in Miss Jones 6; Flashpoint; In The Flesh; Phoenix Rising; The Rear Arrangers; Ritual; Skin Unbound	**When Rocco Meats Kelly 2: In Barcelona**‡; Assman 8; Czech Cherry Poppers: The College Years 4; Debauchery 2; Euro Angels 14; Euro Angels: Hardball 3; European Sex Chronicles; Lil' Women 15: Sorority Rush; Return to Planet Sexxx; Penetrating the East 3; Rocco: Animal Trainer; Xtreme Desires
Best Ethnic-Themed Series	Best Gonzo Series
**My Baby Got Back**‡; Black Dirty Debutantes; Black Panty Chronicles; Black Pearls; Bootylicious; Booty Talk; Freaks, Whoes and Flows; Inner City Black Cheerleader Search; Rocks That Ass; South Central Hookers; Sugar Walls; 24/7	**Seymore Butts**‡; Action Sports Sex; Beach Bunnies With Big Browneyes; Ben Dover; Freshman Fantasies; Hardcore Junior College Schoolgirls; Hot Bods and Tail Pipe; "Please!"; Real Sex Magazine; Whack Attack; World Sex Tour
Best Couples Sex Scene—Film	Best Couples Sex Scene—Video
**Asia Carrera, James Bonn, Search for the Snow Leopard**‡; Stephanie Swift, Vince Vouyer, Debbie Does Dallas 99; Gwen Summers, Julian, Nothing to Hide 3 & 4; Lea Martini, Ramon, Pin-Ups; Randy Spears, Allysin Chaynes, Poser; James Bonn, Azlea Antistia, Seven Deadly Sins; Nick East, Heather Hunter, Star Hunter; Inari Vachs, Jake Steed, Stray Cat; Olga Rios, Bobby Vitale, Talent Scout; Misty Rain, Mark Davis, Things Change 3; Inari Vachs, Evan Stone, Three; Shaena Steel, Ed Powers, Tight Shots: The Movie	**Zoë, Van Damage, Hardcore Championship Fucking**‡; Anastasia Blue, Billy Glide, Barely Legal; Tera Patrick, Mickey G., Crossroads; Lena, Alec Metro, Freshman Fantasies 22; Keper Real, Jake Steed, Fresh Meat 7; Missy, Herschel Savage, The Kissing Game; Allysin Chaynes, Mark Vega, Psychedelisex; Brandon Iron, Katie June, Real Sex Magazine 18; Tiffany Mynx, Paul Carrigan, Return of the Nightstalker; Alex Sanders, Phaedra Alexis, Sodomania 28; John Decker, Ginger Lynn, Torn; Sean Michaels, Chloe, We Go Deep
Best All-Girl Sex Scene—Film	Best All-Girl Sex Scene—Video
**Janine, Julia Ann, Seven Deadly Sins**‡; Claudia Chase, Sheila Stone, Amber Michaels, Day Dreamer; Jenna Jameson, Felecia, Stephanie Swift, Hell on Heels; Ashley, Karin, Playthings; Dee, Leanni Lei, Deva Station, Statues; Devon, Maya Divine, Devinn Lane, Three; Inari Vachs, Katie Gold, Trial By Copulation; Alex Taylor, Raylene, Charlie, Wildlife	**Alisha Klass, Chloe, Tampa Tushy Fest**‡; Nikita, Lisa Belle, Dark Garden; Sorority Hazing Scene (Allysin Chaynes, Gwen Summers, Katie Gold, Kristin), Kelly the Coed 2; RayVeness, Shanna McCullough, Lipstick Lesbians 6; Inari Vachs, Monique DeMoan, Mia Smiles, Nasty Girls 20; Eight-Girl Orgy, No Man's Land 26; Annabel Chong, Eden Rae, Poison Candy (second scene); Jill Kelly, Katie Gold, Porno Playground; Chaz Vincent, Cheyenne Silver, Rocks That Ass 3; Roxanne Hall, Alexandra Nice, Slutwoman; Chloe, Ginger Lynn, Torn; The Group Finale (Dyanna Lauren, Heather Hunter, Janine, Jenteal, Kobe Tai, Leslie Glass, Tia Bella), Where The Boys Aren't 11

=== Additional Award Winners ===
These awards were announced, but not presented, in two winners-only segments read by Taylor Hayes and Christi Lake during the event. Trophies were given to the recipients off-stage:

- The Adult Video Nudes Award: Kid Vegas: Whoremaster
- Best All-Girl Feature: The 4 Finger Club 2
- Best All-Girl Series: The Violation of ...
- Best Alternative Video: DreamGirls—Real Adventures 5
- Best Anal Sex Scene—Video: Anastasia Blue, Lexington Steele, Whack Attack 6
- Best Anal Sex Scene—Film: Chloe, Chris Cannon, Breaking Up
- Best Anal-Themed Series: Rocco's True Anal Stories
- Best Art Direction—Video: Double Feature!
- Best Art Direction—Film: Seven Deadly Sins
- Best Cinematography: Johnny English, Search For The Snow Leopard
- Best Classic Release on DVD: The Devil in Miss Jones, Part III & IV
- Best Continuing Video Series: The Voyeur
- Best Director—Foreign: Anita Rinaldi, Return to Planet Sexxx
- Best DVD Extras: Electric Sex, Digital Sin
- Best Ethnic-Themed Video: Freaks, Whoes and Flows 10
- Best Film Editing: Ren Savant, Seven Deadly Sins
- Best Foreign Feature: Amanda's Diary 2
- Best Group Sex Scene—Film: Wendi Knight, Brandon Iron, Pat Myne, Michael J. Cox, Nothing to Hide 3 & 4
- Best Group Sex Scene—Video: Final Orgy (Chandler, Chloe, Inari Vachs, Ava Vincent, Nina Hartley, Sydnee Steele, Tristan Taormino, Kyle Stone, Nacho Vidal, Tony Tedeschi), Tristan Taormino's Ultimate Guide to Anal Sex for Women
- Best Interactive DVD: Vivid Virtual Vixens
- Best Non-Sex Performance: Anthony Crane, Double Feature!
- Best Oral-Themed Series: Blowjob Adventures of Dr. Fellatio
- Best Oral-Themed Feature: Shut Up and Blow Me! 14
- Best Overall Marketing Campaign—Company Image: Vivid Video
- Best Overall Marketing Campaign—Individual Project: Condom PSAs, Wicked Pictures; Wrestling Promotion, Extreme Associates (tie)
- Best Packaging: Double Feature! Wicked Pictures
- Best Pro-Am or Amateur Line: Homegrown Video
- Best Pro-Am or Amateur Tape: GM Video #242: Labor Day Wet T&A '99, Vols. 1–3
- Best Screenplay—Film: Ren Savant, Eugenie Brown, Seven Deadly Sins
- Best Screenplay—Video: Martin Brimmer, Double Feature!
- Best Sex Scene in a Foreign Release: Rocco Siffredi, Kelly, Alba Dea Monte, Nacho Vidal, When Rocco Meats Kelly 2: In Barcelona
- Best Solo Sex Scene: Chloe, What Makes You Cum
- Best Special Effects: Michael Ninn, Cashmere
- Best Specialty Tape—Big Bust: Natural Wonders of the World 5
- Best Specialty Tape—Bondage & D/s: Rough Sex 1
- Best Specialty Tape—Other Genre: Barefoot Confidential 2
- Best Specialty Tape—Spanking: Spanking Hotline
- Best Supporting Actor—Film: Michael J. Cox, Seven Deadly Sins
- Best Supporting Actor—Video: Tom Byron, LA 399
- Best Supporting Actress—Film: Janine, Seven Deadly Sins
- Best Supporting Actress—Video: Shanna McCullough, Double Feature!
- Best Tease Performance: Dahlia Grey, Playthings
- Best Trannie Tape: Rogue Adventures 3: Big-Ass She-Males
- Best Video Editing: Jonathan Morgan, Double Feature!
- Best Videography: Barry Wood, Dark Garden
- Best Vignette Series: Perverted Stories
- Most Outrageous Sex Scene: Mila, Herschel Savage and Dave Hardman in "The Devil Made Her Do It," Perverted Stories 22
- Safe Sex Award: What Makes You Cum?, VCA Xplicit

=== Honorary AVN Awards ===
==== AVN Special Achievement Award/Reuben Sturman Award ====
- Howard Stern, David Sturman

==== Hall of Fame ====
AVN Hall of Fame inductees for 2000 were: No announcement at the show

=== Multiple nominations and awards ===
The following releases received the most nominations.

Nominations	Movie
15	Seven Deadly Sins
12	Nothing to Hide 3 & 4
11	The Awakening
11	Double Feature!
9	The Devil in Miss Jones 6
9	Search for the Snow Leopard
8	Chloe
8	Dark Garden
8	The Kissing Game
8	Talent Scout
8	Three
8	Torn

The following 12 releases received multiple awards:

Awards	Movie
10	Double Feature!
8	Seven Deadly Sins
2	Cashmere
2	Chloe
2	Dark Garden
2	Perverted Stories 22
2	Playthings
2	Search for the Snow Leopard
2	Tristan Taormino's Ultimate Guide to Anal Sex for Women
2	Voyeur 12
2	What Makes You Cum
2	When Rocco Meats Kelly 2: In Barcelona

== Presenters and performers ==
The following individuals presented awards or performed musical numbers or comedy. The show's trophy girls were Layla and Alexa Rae.

=== Presenters (in order of appearance) ===
Name(s)	Role
Alisha Klass; Herschel Savage	Presenters of the Best New Starlet Award
Jenna Jameson; Bobby Vitale	Presenters of the award for Best Actor—Video and Best Actress—Video
Chloe; Houston	Presenters of the awards for Best Ethnic Themed Series and Best Gonzo Series
Ron Jeremy; Marilyn Chambers; Devinn Lane	Presenters of the awards for Best All-Girl Sex Scene—Film and Best All-Girl Sex Scene—Video
Julia Ann; Randy Spears	Presenters of the awards for Best DVD and Best Gonzo Tape
Bobby Slayton; Brittany Andrews; Stephanie Swift	Presenters of the award for Best Anal-Themed Feature and Best Comedy
David Chryso; Dolly Golden; Tera Patrick	Presenters of the Hot Video Award (Best American Release in Europe)
Inari Vachs; Barrett Moore	Presenters of the Best Foreign Vignette Tape and Best Vignette Tape
Raylene; Kobe Tai	Presenters of the awards for Best Couples Sex Scene—Film and Best Couples Sex Scene—Video
Al Goldstein; Ed Powers	Presenters of the awards for Best Selling Tape and Best Renting Tape
Paul Fishbein	Presenter of the AVN Special Achievement Awards, renamed the Reuben Sturman Memorial Award
Ginger Lynn; Mr. Marcus; Shayla LaVeaux	Presenters of the awards for Best Actor—Film and Best Actress—Film
Jill Kelly; Sydnee Steele; Julian	Presenters of the awards for Male Performer of the Year and Female Performer of the Year
Kylie Ireland; Misty Rain	Presenters of the awards for Best Director—Film and Best Director—Video
Serenity; Jasmin St. Claire; Dee	Presenters of the awards for Best All-Sex Film and Best All-Sex Video
Kira Kenner; Temptress; Nina Hartley	Presenters of the awards for Best Film and Best Video

=== Performers ===
Name(s)	Role	Performed
Bobby Slayton	Performer	Standup comedy segment
Jimmie Lykes and the Club Swingers	Performers	Musical numbers: "Female Fishin' ", "Blinded by Blondes"

== Ceremony information ==
For 2000, the event was moved to the eight-month-old Venetian Hotel and Casino and Genesis magazine noted the annual show "was as much style as substance as several thousand porn stars, directors, producers and fans poured into the massive ballroom."

Following criticism of the previous year's four-hour show, host Juli Ashton announced she was going to try to keep the 2000 show short; it ended up running slightly longer than two hours.

Alisha Klass tried to shock the audience during the show, first by coming out wearing a microscopic dress and with a ball-gag in her mouth to announce the winner of Best New Starlet, then later by pulling off her clothes as adult stars jumped on stage to dance to orchestra Jimmie Lykes and the Club Swingers prior to announcement of the final two awards.

AVN founder Paul Fishbein, who presented the AVN Special Achievement awards, announced they were being renamed the Reuben Sturman Memorial Award to honor Sturman for his contributions to the industry. Meanwhile, when Howard Stern refused to attend and accept his Achievement Award, Beetlejuice took to the podium to accept on his behalf and "rambled incomprehensibly" and had to be interrupted to stop what seemed like an endless speech.

Meanwhile, Hustler noted, "This year's AVN Awards inspired many catcalls and boos from the allies of losing nominees, prompting Jill Kelly to remark that the camaraderie of past awards shows had been replaced with a mean-spirited competitiveness this year."

Several new awards were introduced for this years show; among them: Best Specialty Tape—Big Bust. The show was recorded and a video of the awards show was issued by VCA Pictures.

=== Performance of year's movies ===
The Houston 620 was announced as the adult movie industry's top selling movie while The Devil in Miss Jones 6 was the top renting movie of the previous year.

== In Memoriam ==
The annual moment of silence tribute for those who died during the past year, presented by AVN founder Paul Fishbein, honored the following people: Bob Vosse, Bruce Walker, Stanley Fleischman, Paul Wisner, Kim Kataine, Albert Sanchez, David Chandler, Lou Perraino and Rene Bond.

== See also ==
- AVN Award
- AVN Best New Starlet Award
- AVN Award for Male Performer of the Year
- AVN Award for Male Foreign Performer of the Year
- AVN Female Performer of the Year Award
- List of members of the AVN Hall of Fame
- 2000 GayVN Awards
