= Porn Star: The Legend of Ron Jeremy =

2001 film based on the life of porn actor Ron Jeremy

- Theatrical release poster
- Directed by: Scott J. Gill
- Produced by: Kirt Eftekhar; Scott J. Gill (producers); Tim Goldberg (executive producer); Sean Skelton (associate producer)
- Starring: Ron Jeremy
- Cinematography: Scott J. Gill; Ralph King
- Edited by: Scott J. Gill
- Music by: Carvin Knowles
- Production companies: District Films; Maelstrom Entertainment; Radius Productions
- Distributed by: Maelstrom Entertainment; Outrider Films
- Release date: November 30, 2001
- Country: United States
- Box office: $421,516

Porn Star: The Legend of Ron Jeremy is a 2001 American documentary film based on the life of porn actor Ron Jeremy. The film is directed and written by Scott J. Gill. The film features Jeremy describing his life and career, and co-stars Larry Flynt, Adam Rifkin, Seymore Butts, Alisha Klass, Phoebe Dollar, Kenny Dollar, Jenna Jameson, and Troy Duffy. The film is produced by Kirt Eftekhar, and Gill.

Porn Star: The Legend of Ron Jeremy was released theatrically on November 30, 2001, and on home media on March 25, 2003. The film won various awards, including Best Feature, Audience Award at the No Dance Film Festival, and Best Film at the Melbourne Underground Film Festival. The film was nominated for Best Documentary at the Chicago Film Critics Association Awards.

== Synopsis ==
In 1978, Ron Hyatt (now Ron Jeremy) was a teacher who dreamed of some day becoming an actor. One day his girlfriend sent his nude photo to Playgirl magazine, who published the picture as part of their "Boy Next Door" feature. Later he was asked to star in a hardcore pornographic film, beginning his pornographic career. Jeremy became one of the biggest male pornographic actors in the adult film industry. He is nicknamed "The Hedgehog" due to "measuring in at 5-foot-6 and 250 pounds, with a bushy moustache and shoulder-length, and greasy black hair".

== Cast ==
Credits adapted from Rotten Tomatoes.

- Ron Jeremy
- Larry Flynt
- Adam Rifkin
- Seymore Butts
- Alisha Klass
- Phoebe Dollar
- Kenny Dollar
- Troy Duffy
- Jenna Jameson

== Reception ==
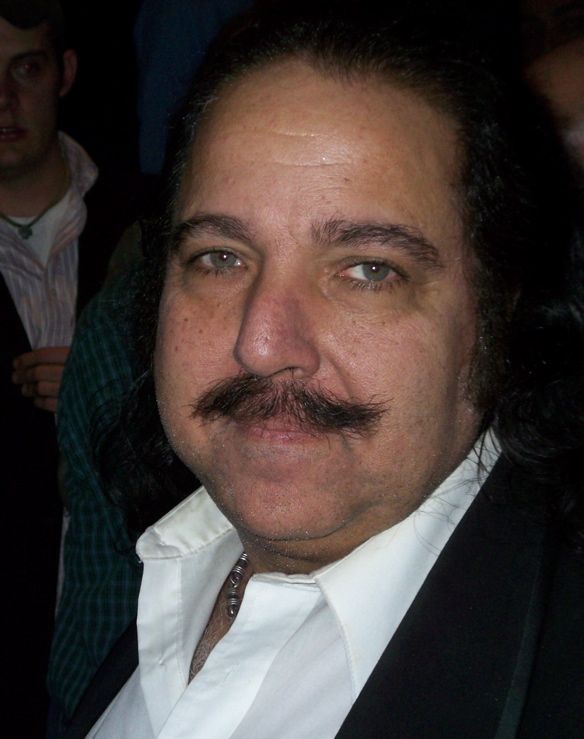
Ron Jeremy at the 2007 AVN Awards

=== Box office ===
In its opening weekend, Porn Star: The Legend of Ron Jeremy was screened in two theaters, grossing $23,865 with an average of $11,932 per theater. In its second weekend, the film was screened in seven theatres, grossing $39,011 with an average of $5,573 per theater. Porn Star: The Legend of Ron Jeremy grossed $421,516 worldwide for its 35-day run in theaters.

=== Critical response ===
On the review aggregator Rotten Tomatoes, the film holds an approval rating of 69% based on 48 reviews, with an average rating of 6.11/10. The website's critical consensus reads: "Porn Star is both an entertaining and poignant documentary on the life of Ron Jeremy". Metacritic, which uses a weighted average, assigned the film a score of 54 out of 100, based on 18 critics, indicating "mixed or average reviews".

Michael O'Sullivan, writing for The Washington Post, called Porn Star "a documentary portrait that is as sad as it is funny". Edward Guthmann of San Francisco Chronicle wrote: "Shot over 18 months and edited from 150 hours of footage, "Porn Star" is a lively, ultimately sad portrait that asks a very good question – how can someone who looks as bad as Jeremy be a porn star? – and offers some reasonable answers".

Collin Souter of efilmcritic wrote: "If you only want to see a documentary about a man and his oversized, flesh colored abyss, alien, you could do a lot worse. You will learn a thing or two about his butter churning technique". Jim Sullivan of The Boston Globe wrote: "Gill's take on Jeremy's porn life is neither celebratory nor cautionary. It's the portrait of a porn star as a somewhat complicated man, one who savors basking in the spotlight and doesn't mind what reflection it casts".

=== Accolades ===
Year	Award	Category	Result	Ref(s).
2001	No Dance Film Festival	Best Feature	Won	
2001	No Dance Film Festival	Audience Award	Won	
2002	Melbourne Underground Film Festival	Best Film	Won	
2002	Chicago Film Critics Association Awards	Best Documentary	Nominated	
