= Adult Performer Advocacy Committee =

American organized labor group

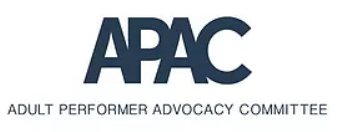
- Abbreviation: APAC
- Formation: February 2014; 12 years ago
- Founders: Anikka Albrite; Mick Blue; James Deen; Stoya
- Members: 600 (2016)
- Website: apacommittee.org

Adult Performer Advocacy Committee (APAC) is an American organized labor group for pornographic actors. Launched in 2014, shortly after the closure of the Adult Industry Medical Health Care Foundation (AIM), the organization released a video called Porn 101 containing advice for new and established pornographic performers. APAC operates a mentor scheme and maintains resources for people starting pornographic acting, as well as hosting panels, releasing statements and lobbying.

A founding member of the group, James Deen, resigned from his roles in 2015 after a series of sexual assault and rape allegations against him, involving actions both in his personal relationships and on-screen performing. The 2018 chair, Ginger Banks, resigned after her initial response to a scene in which her co-star raised concerns about the behaviour of John Stagliano caused backlash and harassment. Other performers with major roles in the organization have included Stoya, Nina Hartley, Chanel Preston and Tasha Reign.

== History ==
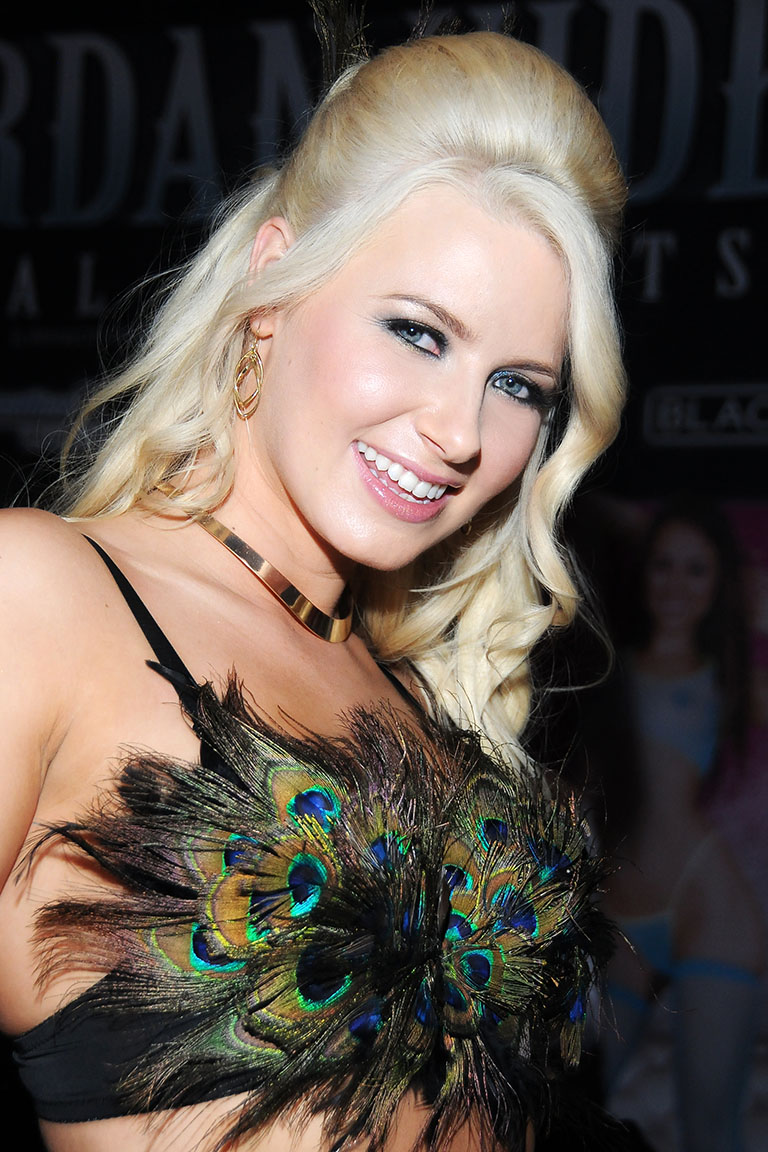
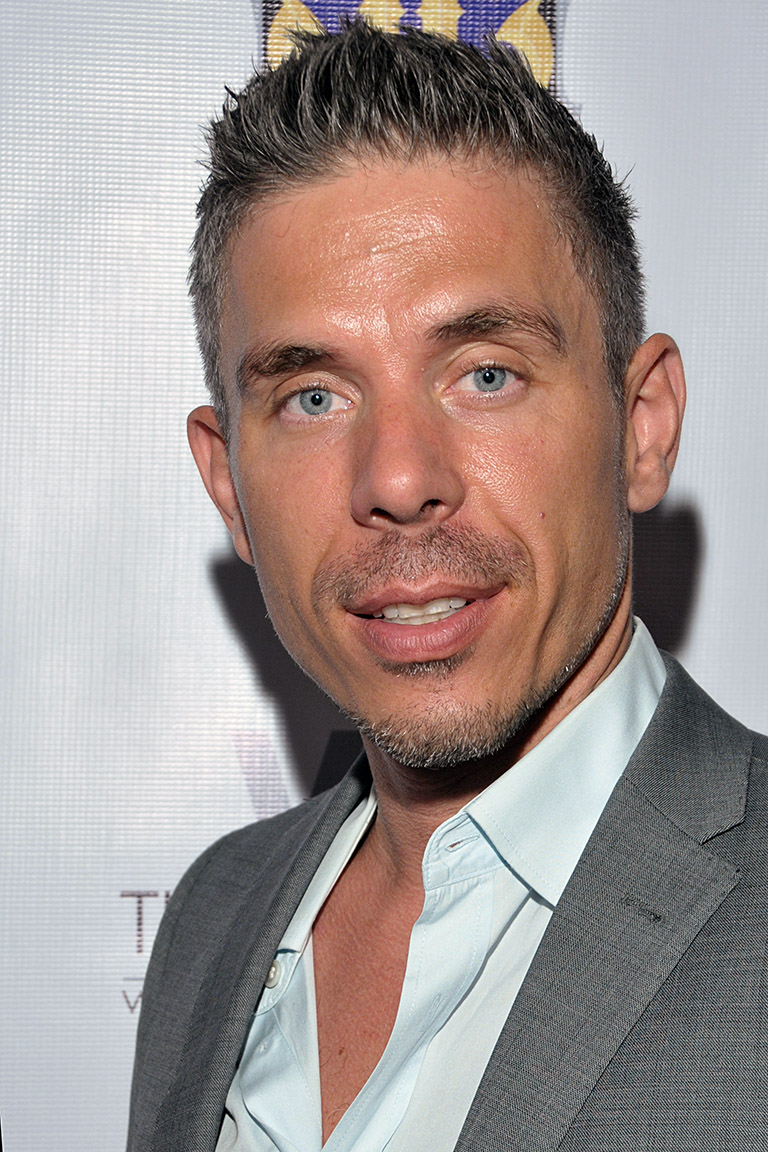
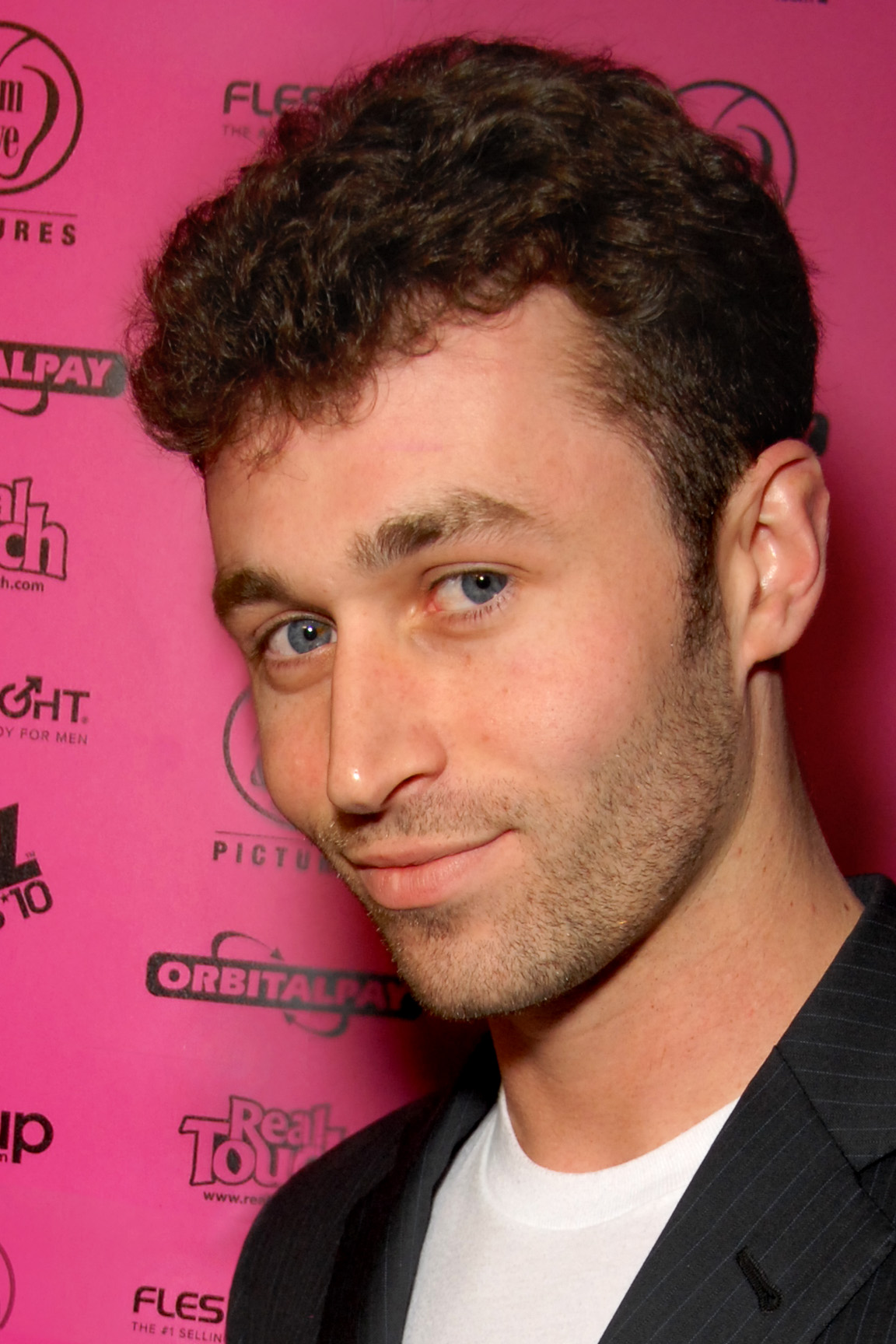
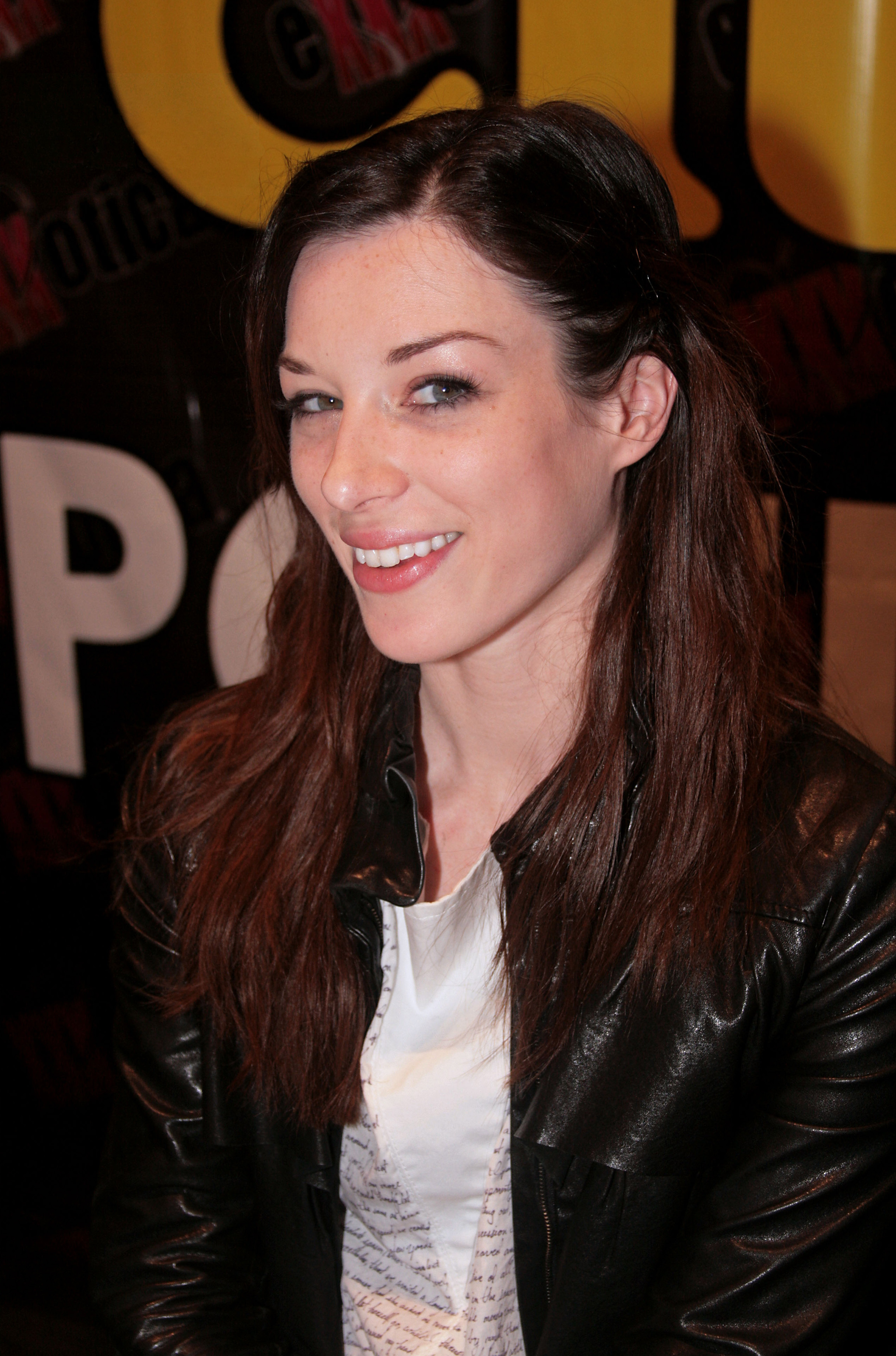
Pornographic actors involved in the founding of APAC, clockwise from top: Anikka Albrite, Mick Blue, Stoya, James Deen

The group was initially formed by the pornographic actors Anikka Albrite, Mick Blue, James Deen and Stoya. It was launched in February 2014 to represent the interests of pornographic actors, including their workers' rights, health and safety, and community organization. Nina Hartley said that similar organizations to APAC had failed "due to lack of organization or outright strangulation by ... producers", and that APAC arose from the new forms of communication allowed by social media, both within the industry and in communicating with the public.

External videos
- Porn 101; Educational video by APAC, 2014

One of the group's first activities was the production of a Porn 101 advice video for aspiring and current pornographic performers. It shares its name with a previous video on the same subject, produced by Sharon Mitchell around the formation of the Adult Industry Medical Health Care Foundation (AIM) in 1998 after an HIV outbreak in American pornography; AIM closed in 2011. Jessica Drake, Nina Hartley and Kimberly Kane, who had independently considered a sequel video to Porn 101, were involved in the script. The video featured a large number of actors, many of whom joined APAC. Mark Kernes of AVN recommended it as "a must-see for anyone thinking of entering the adult industry—and for many who are already in it". David M. Kopp, in Famous and (Infamous) Workplace and Community Training (2017), praised the video as "a well-done, first-rate piece of asynchronous training".

After the 2014 Board of Directors election, Deen began serving as chair, with Chanel Preston as president, Conner Habib as vice president, Veruca James as treasurer and Ela Darling as secretary. In 2015, Deen was accused of sexual assault and rape by numerous women, including abuse in personal relationships and on pornographic sets. After the allegations were made public, first by Stoya, Deen stood down from his roles in APAC, who released a statement saying "we stand with performers and other sex workers who are victims of any sort of sexual assault". However, Preston—the president, who also assumed Deen's role as chairperson—was in a relationship with Deen. Aurora Snow, writing in The Daily Beast, commented: "It may prove difficult for women ... to turn to an organization now headed by Deen's current partner, but Preston is not to blame for this. In an industry this small many—if not most—performers drift in and out of relationships with one another ... Nonetheless, women who have felt victimized by Deen may feel like they have nowhere to turn but to the public".

In early 2018, chairperson Tasha Reign told The Washington Post that she aimed for all pornographic workers to receive training, including directors and producers, and that the Me Too movement made her "more empowered" in speaking freely. She advocated regulation and resources relating to health—including mental health—consent and harassment. Reign personally supported a raise in the minimum age of a pornographic performer in the United States from 18 to 21.

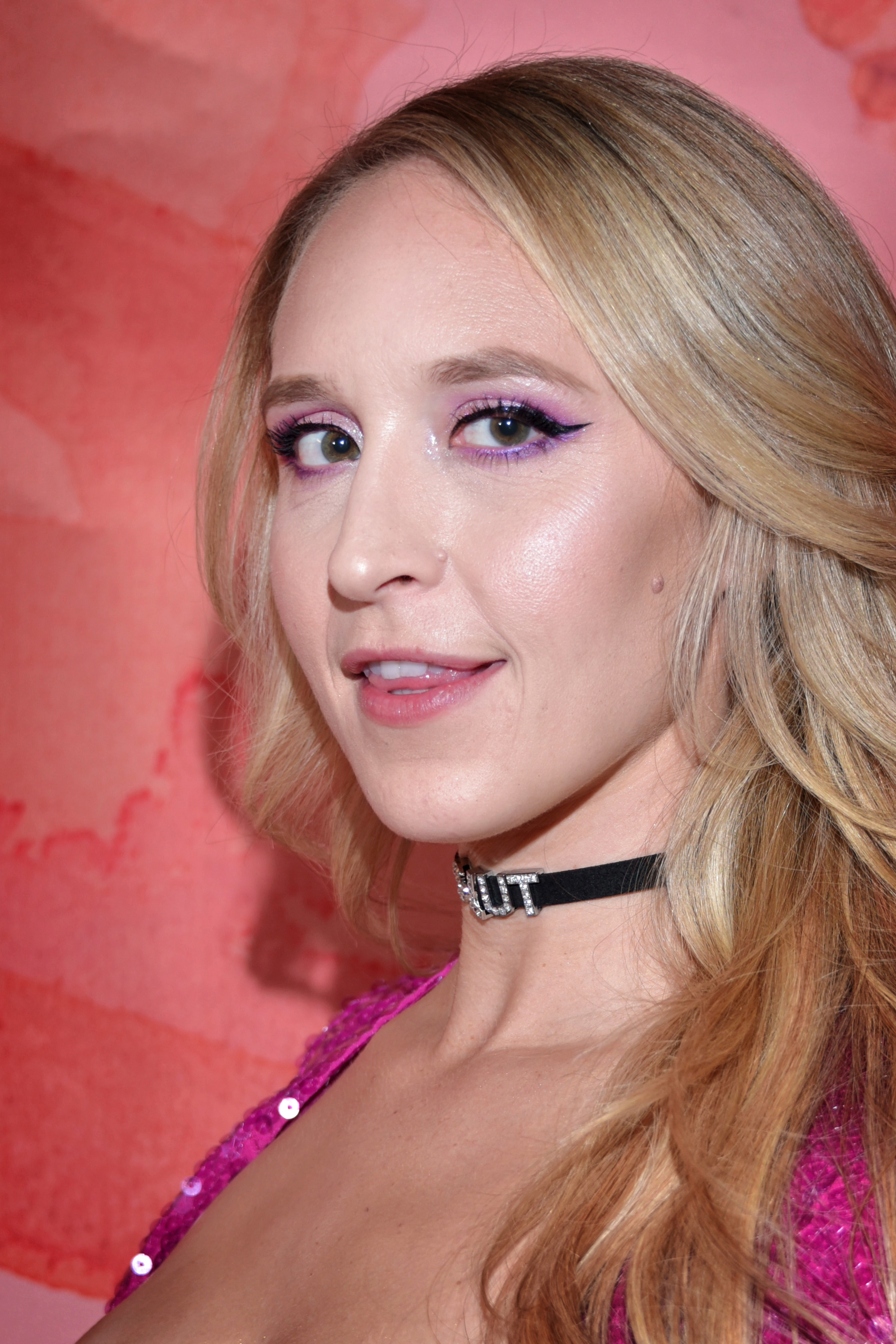
Ginger Banks resigned as chair of APAC in 2018.

Later in 2018, the newly-elected chairperson Ginger Banks filmed an Evil Angel scene with Jenny Blighe. Both Banks and Blighe were webcam models and this was their first pornographic scene, a girl-girl scene directed by John Stagliano. According to Banks and Blighe, Stagliano touched them without their consent during the filming. After Blighe made her experience public, Banks began experiencing online harassment due to her initial response. Prior to a vote over whether to remove Banks as chair, she made a video including details of her experience and Blighe's boyfriend. After the video, Blighe called for Banks's removal, and she voluntarily stood down. Banks later filed a report of sexual battery and apologized to Blighe both privately and publicly, saying in 2020, "I should be held accountable for my part in the gaslighting and denying her reality".

On August 10th 2022, Adult Performer Advocacy Committee published a Performer Bill of Rights. This document details what performers have a right to when hired. Also indicates what performers are entitled to, to maintain a generally positive experience in their careers, as well as what conditions are conducive to mental, emotional, and physical health.

== Membership and activities ==
Membership to APAC is open only to pornographic performers. In 2016, there were around 600 members. APAC hosts panels on sex work, maintains directories of resources for performers, and releases statements on behalf of its members on issues that arise within the industry. Its stamps of approval highlight experts in health, law and other areas who do not discriminate against sex workers. A mentor program is targeted at people entering the industry, in addition to other guidance available to newcomers. A 2021 resource produced collaboratively with the Free Speech Coalition (FSC) outlines options for conflict resolution and responding to negative incidents on pornographic sets. The organization is active on Twitter. It has lobbied against legislation such as Proposition 60, a California ballot proposition in 2016 that would have required condom use in pornography.

The organization has been criticized as lacking diversity. A planned photo shoot and content collaboration organized by APAC featured no female or non-white photographers. Reyes said in 2020: "We got called out for it, we admitted our mistake, and we took steps to address it". In Pornography and Public Health (2021), Emily F. Rothman wrote that the organization has been criticized for a lack of senior figures involved in gay pornography production. Additionally, Rob Zicari stated in 2014 that "APAC is a front for Free Speech Coalition, agents and producers", rather than pornographic actors. Zicari founded the United Adult Workers of America in 2013 as an alternative to the FSC, but it had dissolved within a year.
