= Archer's Last Day =

- DVD released by Extreme Associates
- Directed by: Charles Pinion
- Written by: Charles Pinion
- Produced by: Robert Black
- Starring: Tom Byron; Monique; Iroc; Stryc-9; Alana Evans; Jewel Valmont; Kenya; Michael Stefano; Van Damage
- Edited by: Charles Pinion
- Music by: Neither/Neither World; Wendy Van Dusen
- Production company: Extreme Associates
- Distributed by: Extreme Associates
- Release date: February 11, 1999 (United States)
- Running time: 92 minutes
- Country: United States
- Language: English

Archer's Last Day is a 1999 American pornographic horror film written and directed by Charles Pinion (as "Charley Crow") and produced and distributed by Extreme Associates. It stars Tom Byron as Tim Archer, a factory worker who experiences increasingly surreal events after being fired, and also stars Monique, Iroc, Stryc-9, Alana Evans, Jewel Valmont, Kenya, Michael Stefano, and Van Damage.

== Plot ==
Tim Archer, a factory worker at Unified Resources, is fired after thirteen years of employment, with his apathetic boss, Mr. Cornhall, informing him, "You may be losing your job today, but there's a dozen qualified Guatemalans who are gaining employment tomorrow." Returning home, Tim finds his wife, a shopaholic named Beulah, entranced by a broadcast of the Home Pyramid Shopping Club. Tim flushes his and Beulah's credit card down the toilet and then has sex with Beulah. Afterward, Beulah hits Tim over the head with a telephone and kicks him out, which prompts Tim to return to Unified Resources. There, Tim rapes a woman, who, in a demonic voice, eventually begins encouraging Tim. After Tim finishes sexually assaulting the woman, she hands Tim a telephone, the voice on the other end of which states, "You had to do it, didn't you, Tim? You had to take the bait."

Tim awakens, bound to a chair, on the set of the Home Pyramid Shopping Club. Beulah is unable to buy Tim without their credit card, and Tim can only watch through the television as Beulah spitefully has sex with a pair of police officers whom she had earlier called about the missing Tim. As Tim cries out for Beulah, he is shot in the head and awakens in a temple, where he has a threesome with two women, both of whom proclaim, "We can heal you." The women then demand Tim's credit card number, and when Tim claims not to know what it is, he is condemned to Hell.

Tim has another threesome, this time with a pair of demonesses, amid the dead and mutilated bodies dotting Hell. As the demonesses begin taunting Tim over how his torment in Hell is only just beginning, Tim awakens again, this time in his bedroom with Beulah. It is revealed that everything that had transpired after Tim had sex with Beulah was just a nightmare that Tim had experienced after being hit in the head by Beulah. Beulah joins Tim in their bed, and, after she suggests that she and Tim have a baby, Tim monotonously replies, "Okay."

== Cast ==
- Sam Everlast as Hidden Truth/Home Pyramid Shopping Club Host
- Tom Byron as Tim Archer
- Gina Velour as Woman on Monitor
- John Nystrom as Mr. Cornhall
- Monique as Beulah Archer
- Alana Evans as Woman Alone
- Iroc as Temple Whore
- Stryc-9 as Temple Whore
- Jewel Valmont as Devil Girl
- Kenya as Devil Girl
- Van Damage as Officer McNuñez
- Michael Stefano as Officer O'Herrera

== Production ==
According to director Charles Pinion, he was given free rein to "make whatever he wanted" by Extreme Associates so long as any film that he shot for the company had "five fuck scenes in it." Actress Stryc-9, as well as blogger Luke Ford, claimed that there were no official model releases for Archer's Last Day and that they were forged, an allegation that was denied by the film's producer, Robert Black.

== Release ==
Archer's Last Day was released direct-to-video on February 11, 1999. On September 15, 2017, a version of the film with the hardcore sex footage removed was screened at the Superchief Gallery in Queens, New York, as part of Pinion Armageddon, a weeklong event celebrating the filmmaking career of director Charles Pinion and the home video release of his 2014 film American Mummy.

== Reception ==
AVN awarded Archer's Last Day a perfect score of 5/5 and succinctly stated, "Sly humor; anal and facials; hot all-natural chicks; a semi-rape and Tom Byron. Beautiful." Peter van Aarle of Cyberspace Adult Video Reviews gave Archer's Last Day a grade of 8.74 on a scale of 6.00/10.00, criticized the video quality and the lighting of the film's final two sex scenes, and concluded that the quality "varies on this video." Archer's Last Day was deemed "a decent flick" with "superb" acting by Tom Byron in a review posted to Rec.Arts.Movies.Erotica. Another review posted to Rec.Arts.Movies.Erotica similarly labelled the film "highly recommended" and further stated, "Though I didn't go in to it, this is a great movie. Not just the great sex that Extreme always provides, but a great movie that could stand on it's [sic] own."

Roger T. Pipe gave Archer's Last Day a grade of 9/10 and, while critical of elements such as the rape scene and the lighting, praised every other aspect of it, writing, "Archer is a very good adult film, with hot sex, some interesting visuals and just a touch of social commentary. (OK, that last one was a stretch.)" ViceList had a mixed response to the film, calling the ending "shitty" but otherwise stating, "Despite the psychedelic lighting, overfading and no real sense of purpose, the combined effect ends up being surprisingly entertaining." Author Mikita Brottman commended the film's "surrealism, irony, and tongue-in-cheek humor" in her 2005 book High Theory/Low Culture.

Archer's Last Day was nominated for Best Video Feature at the 17th AVN Awards. At the same event, Tom Byron was nominated for Best Actor (Video) while Charles Pinion was nominated for Best Director (Video).
