= Tampa Tushy Fest, Part 1 =

- Directed by: Seymore Butts
- Starring: Alisha Klass; Samantha Stylle; Montana Gunn; Chloe Nicholle
- Release date: 1999
- Running time: 92 minutes
- Language: English

Tampa Tushy Fest, Part 1 is a 1999 American pornographic film directed by Seymore Butts (Adam Glasser) and starring Alisha Klass, Samantha Stylle, Montana Gunn, and Chloe Nicholle. It became a center of a legal case about obscenity in California. The film features fisting, a sexual act where a hand is inserted into a vagina or anus, which Los Angeles City attorney Deborah Sanchez considered an obscenity.

== Cast ==
- Alisha Klass
- Samantha Stylle
- Montana Gunn
- Chloe Nicholle

== Award ==
At the 17th AVN Awards in 2000 the film won the "Best All-Girl Sex Scene - Video" award.

== Legal history ==
On December 15, 2000, the Los Angeles Police Department raided the office of porn director and producer Seymore Butts. He was charged with two counts of obscenity by Deputy Los Angeles City attorney Deborah Sanchez. Trial was scheduled for March 20, 2002, when it would have become the first obscenity trial in Los Angeles since 1993. On the trial date Glasser settled with the Los Angeles City attorney's office agreeing to pay 1000 dollars to a victims’ restitution fund. He was also mandated to produce a censored version of the film for California and was allowed to sell uncensored versions as well.
