= The Center of the World =

2001 film by Wayne Wang

- Theatrical release poster
- Directed by: Wayne Wang
- Written by: Wayne Wang; Miranda July; Paul Auster; Siri Hustvedt
- Produced by: Wayne Wang; Peter Newman
- Starring: Peter Sarsgaard; Molly Parker; Carla Gugino; Balthazar Getty
- Cinematography: Mauro Fiore
- Edited by: Lee Percy
- Music by: Stewart Copeland
- Production company: Redeemable Features
- Distributed by: Artisan Entertainment
- Release date: April 20, 2001
- Running time: 88 minutes
- Country: United States
- Language: English
- Box office: $1,460,687

The Center of the World is a 2001 American drama film directed by Wayne Wang and shot on digital video. It stars Peter Sarsgaard as a dot-com millionaire who hires a drummer/stripper (Molly Parker) to stay with him in Las Vegas for three days for US$10,000. The film was screened out of competition at the 2001 Cannes Film Festival.

== Plot ==
A couple checks into a hotel suite in Las Vegas. Flashbacks show that he's a computer whiz on the verge of becoming a dot-com millionaire. She's a lap dancer at a club. He's depressed, withdrawing from work, missing meetings with investors. He wants a connection, so he offers her $10,000 to spend three nights with him in Vegas. She accepts with conditions: four hours per night of erotic play, and no penetration.

During the days in Vegas, they get to know each other, have fun, and meet a friend of hers, casino dealer Jerri. After the first night, things get complicated. When the three days are over, the stripper makes it clear that she is only there for the money and that the man she spends the time with is just a client. Upset that his feelings aren't reciprocated, he rapes her; she makes no attempt to stop him. She then masturbates for him, achieving orgasm, saying "you want to see real? I'll show you real." The next day he returns home heartbroken.

The movie ends with his return to the strip club to see the woman he fell in love with again. She greets him fondly but interacts with him the way she had when they first met: as a stripper and a client ordering a lap dance.

== Cast ==
- Peter Sarsgaard as Richard Longman
- Molly Parker as Florence
- Mel Gorham as Roxanne
- Shane Edelman as Porter
- Karry Brown as Lap dancer
- Alisha Klass as Pandora stripper
- Lisa Newlan as Porn site woman
- Jason Calacanis as Pete
- Travis Miljan as Dog owner
- Jerry Sherman as Old man
- Carla Gugino as Jerri
- Pat Morita as Taxi driver
- Balthazar Getty as Brian Pivano
- Robert Lefkowitz as Motel manager
- John Lombardo as Gondolier

== Production ==
=== Development ===
In January 2000, Wayne Wang announced plans to direct The Center of the World for Artisan Entertainment. Wang said he "wanted to make a really erotic film about sex and love, that could be like ‘The Last Tango in Paris’ for a younger generation. I wanted to do a movie about this young generation of guys who are dealing with the Internet, software and day-trading; this whole new world out there where they’re making shitloads of money fast, and not knowing what their lives are about yet besides that money and easy pleasures." Wang chose to shoot the film on digital video, saying "I’ve seen the way the stuff is shot and transferred, and it looks beautiful and interesting in its own way. It’s also flexible, fast and cheaper."

When Wang initially committed to the project, he was at a loss as to what to write for the script. He sought assistance from previous collaborator Paul Auster; Siri Hustvedt, Auster’s wife, and Miranda July. Hustvedt had written extensively on the subjects of sex and feminism, while July had experience in striptease and dancing. Wang drew inspiration from Nan Goldin's photography when envisioning the look of the film. The screenplay was credited to "Ellen Benjamin Wong", a joint pseudonym for Wang, Auster, and Hustvedt. Internet executive Jason Calacanis appeared in and acted as an advisor for the film.

=== Filming ===
Wang chose to set the story in Las Vegas because it is a symbolic "fantasyland" of a place. More traditional film cameras were used at the beginning and end of the story, while Wang used the grainier look of a Sony DRV-100 for the rest of the film to illustrate the "deterioration of [the characters'] relationship." Scenes requiring nudity from the characters were performed by body doubles.

The film's title may be an allusion to Courbet's L'Origine du monde.

== Reception ==
=== Release ===
The Center of the World was given a limited release in the U.S. on April 20, 2001. It was released without a rating from the MPAA as the filmmakers did not want to edit the film's graphic scenes of nudity and sexuality, which includes both female and male full frontal nudity.

=== Censorship controversy ===
A Cincinnati theater owner attracted media attention after allegedly ordering a member of his staff to edit a five-second scene from the film a day before its release. According to Cincinnati CityBeat, Esquire Theater owner Gary Goldman instructed his theater manager and projectionist to cut the scene in which a female stripper (portrayed by adult film actress Alisha Klass) inserts a lollipop into her vagina.

The film's website also generated controversy for featuring an interactive strip club, including a faux online sex chat hosted by Klass.

=== Critical response ===
Rotten Tomatoes gives the film a negative rating of 34% based on 82 reviews. The site's consensus reads: "For all its tease, the movie doesn't have more to say than money can't buy you love". At Metacritic, which assigns a normalized rating to reviews, the film has an average weighted score of 44 out of 100, based on 24 critics, indicating "mixed or average reviews".

Critics compared The Center of the World to films like Last Tango in Paris and 9½ Weeks. Writing for Variety, Dennis Harvey said, "In contrast to most upscale sex drama efforts, Center expends considerable effort on viewing the 'world' from both sides of the usual gender equation." He added the "pic’s tension derives from the ambivalent nature of [Richard and Florence's] relationship", and that Sarsgaard creates a "nuanced" character "as a manchild-ish introvert." Though Harvey commended Wang on drawing credible performances from his leads, he also said the story lacks drive and does not fully explore the characters' psychology.

Harvey also noted the film's "most impressive aspect is its successful pitching of 'the world’s oldest profession' as a problematic but viable personal choice: No one is exploiting Florence, who is far from the usual doomed, drug-addled or airheaded prostie figure seen on screen." Of the film's setting, Harvey said, "Arriving just when the dot-com boom has gone bust, Center’s high-tech nouveau riche angle may strike some viewers as already dated, but in the long run will add a creditable specificity of time/place."

Critic Roger Ebert gave the film a score of 3.5/4 stars and said the characters' psychological mind games with each other are the film's most fascinating aspect. He wrote, "If you understand who the characters are and what they're supposed to represent, the performances are right on the money. Flo is not supposed to be a sexy tart, and Richard is not supposed to be a lustful client. They're sides of the same coin and very much alike."

Molly Parker was nominated for an Independent Spirit Award for Best Female Lead.
