= Conner Habib =

American writer, podcaster, academic, activist (born 1977)

- Born: Andre Khalil; August 23, 1977 (age 49); Boston, Massachusetts, USA
- Education: University of Massachusetts Amherst
- Occupations: Writer; podcaster; former pornographic actor
- Website: connerhabib.com

Conner Habib (born Andre Khalil, August 23, 1977), is an American writer, podcaster, academic, activist and former pornographic actor of Syrian and Irish descent. He hosts Against Everyone With Conner Habib, a podcast where he discusses current events and politics, as well as philosophy, science and spiritual ideas by himself or with guests. Habib's debut novel, Hawk Mountain, was published by W. W. Norton & Company on July 5, 2022, and was longlisted for the PEN/Faulkner Award for Fiction. He has written for numerous publications, including BuzzFeed, Salon.com, MEL Magazine, The Stranger, Vice, Slate, and The Irish Times. As an adult performer, Habib has appeared in pornographic scenes in films distributed by companies such as Titan Media, Men.com, Falcon Entertainment, and Raging Stallion Studios.

== Early life ==
Andre Khalil was born on August 23, 1977, to a Syrian father and an Irish-American mother. He grew up in Catasauqua, Pennsylvania, in a home environment he describes as "areligious". Habib described himself as having a rebellious streak growing up: he recalled spending his teenage years immersed in the Pennsylvania punk scene, and that he once stole a book that deals with occult topics from the school library.

Khalil was first exposed to pornography at a young age when he was watching television with his family via a cable-cheater box which stole channels from their neighbors: Khalil's father accidentally happened upon a channel dedicated to adult pornographic content, but the remote control failed to respond when they attempted to change channels. Khalil credited the experience for instigating his curiosity about pornography that persisted to his adulthood, and led him to question what he believed to be the disconnect between society's consistent stigmatization of sexual imagery and the desire for the same by its members.

== Career ==
=== Academia ===
From 2004 to 2007, Khalil taught literature and composition while studying writing and evolutionary biology at the University of Massachusetts Amherst. He won the Distinguished Teaching Award for his efforts. In 2007 he worked as an English instructor at Western New England University in Springfield, Massachusetts. Khalil eventually relocated to San Francisco to pursue his dream to become an adult performer, though he continued to work as a writer and teacher.

=== Pornography ===
Khalil came up with the name "Conner Habib" after he witnessed two straight men dry humping each other out of jest in a pub in Kenmare. His pseudonym reflects his Irish and Syrian heritage: the last name Habib is a Middle Eastern name which deliberately highlights an underrepresented identity in pornography.

Habib won the GayVN Award for Best Newcomer in 2010. Habib was nominated for several awards at the 2012 Grabby Awards, and won Best Supporting Actor for his performance in the film Dad Goes to College. In 2016, Habib was the co-winner of "Best All Male Threesome" for Dad Out West at the Raven's Eden Awards. Habib appeared in over 150 scenes featuring sexually explicit content during his time working in the adult entertainment industry. Habib's insight and opinion on pornography work inspired the title of the epilogue for author Heather Berg's 2021 publication, Porn Work: Sex, Labor, and Late Capitalism.

=== Post-pornography ===
Habib relocated to Ireland in 2019, where he became involved in projects unrelated to his pornography career. Habib hosted Ulysses - For The Rest Of Us!, a live lecture series and book club centered on James Joyce's Ulysses in collaboration with the Museum Of Literature Ireland. The series ran from June through September 2021, which coincided with the commencement of the Bloomsday festival on June 16, 2021. In October 2021, Habib co-curated an event called "Utopia Ireland" with Una Mullally for The National Concert Hall over the course of five days and nights.

== Activism ==
Habib has been an advocate for sex workers' rights and sex positivity in his writings and presentations. In 2013, Habib promoted discussions about sex positivity and sexual health in a series of presentations and workshops. One such event, which was to be held at Corning Community College and organized by the student group Equal, was canceled after his invitation was rescinded by the college's president following her discovery of Habib's involvement with the adult film industry. Habib authored an article published by BuzzFeed, where he criticized the school president's decision to publicly denounce him. Habib would end up leading a free discussion off-campus at Southeast Steuben County Library, which is located near Corning Community College, on March 21, 2013.

Between 2014 and 2016, he served as the Vice President of the Adult Performer Advocacy Committee, a nonprofit organization with goals of improving quality of life and experiences in the industry of active adult performers. Habib was awarded Publicist of the Year at the Sexual Freedom Awards in recognition of his efforts to promote sex-positive attitudes through his writings and presentations.

== Podcast ==
Habib is the host of the counterculture podcast Against Everyone With Conner Habib. It launched on June 6, 2017, on YouTube, with Habib intending to release at least two episodes each month as an ongoing series. According to Habib, the podcast's name has a dual meaning: it represents his personal desire to resist "dumb ideas and bad public conversations and stupid think pieces" propagated by powerful and influential people, as well as his "aspiration to be against everyone, in the sense of literally pressing up against everyone." The podcast's subject matter is eclectic and may include topics such as radical philosophy, occultism, sexuality, science and literature. Notable individuals who follow the podcast include American musician Michael Stipe, and English singer Olly Alexander.

== Personal life ==
Habib was based in Los Angeles prior to his relocation to Ireland. Habib was previously in a relationship with game designer and musician Jeb Havens for five years. They have since remained close friends. Much of Habib's work is inspired by anthroposophy, founded by the esotericist Rudolf Steiner, as well as other esoteric Christians.
