= Family Business (American TV series) =

American reality television series

- Also known as: Porn: A Family Business
- Genre: Documentary
- Directed by: Jay Blumenfield; Anthony Marsh
- Starring: Seymore Butts; Lila Glasser; Stevie Glasser; Mari Possa
- Country of origin: United States
- Original language: English
- No. of seasons: 4
- No. of episodes: 37

Production
- Running time: 30 minutes
- Production company: Maxwell Productions

Original release
- Network: Showtime
- Release: February 21, 2003 – June 30, 2006

Family Business (referred to as Porn: A Family Business in the United Kingdom) is an American reality television series produced for the cable network Showtime. Based in Los Angeles, the series focused on the pornography industry and the life of Adam Glasser, a reality porn star and video director who uses the stage name Seymore Butts.

Also featured on the series were his son, Brady, along with his mother, Lila Glasser, and his older cousin, Stevie Glasser, both of whom help Adam run the eponymous "family business" of the series, which is a successful porn video production and distribution house in the San Fernando Valley, known for the "Seymore Butts" line of videos.

The series first aired in 2003. In Canada it is broadcast on The Movie Network, Movie Central, and Showcase Television, in the UK on Channel 4, in Latin America on FX and in Israel on Ego. The first two seasons are currently available on DVD in North America. The series ran for four seasons.

The series won the 2005 AVN award for 'Best Alternative Release'.

== Overview ==
Episodes usually followed a day or two in the life of the Glassers. Many episodes focused on Adam, a single father, raising his young son, Brady, while keeping his professional life separate from his private life. Other episodes focused on his difficulties in establishing relationships (finding "Miss Right") outside the porn industry. Adam's mother, Lila, contributes by setting her son up on blind dates or with a speed dating service.

Much of the show's comic relief was provided by Stevie, a cantankerous character who often gets into mischief and, as the series progresses, becomes a video director in his own right, as does Bishop, Glasser's camera operator and video editor.

The series was sexually explicit (though hardcore content was either pixelated or edited out) as it also went behind the scenes of Adam's video shoots, and looked at the life of other porn stars away from the camera. One episode follows Herschel Savage, a performer whose career dated back 33 years, as he tries to establish a second career as a stand-up comedian. Another episode saw Adam and Stevie going to great lengths in order to convince a young woman, his assistant, not to enter the porn industry. The show follows the young woman as she decides to go in front of the camera and creates the porn actress persona Mari Possa. In the second season, an episode featured Stevie and Adam trying to convince Mari not to get breast implants. Another episode followed Stevie as he experienced a cancer scare, spending several days waiting for test results from his doctor.

The second season also includes an episode that follows Glasser's efforts to mount an Internet-based telethon to raise money for freedom of speech causes; this event was in response to his nearly being jailed on obscenity charges several years prior and, according to the episode, was sparked when Glasser discovered a shipment of Seymour Butts tapes that was about to be inadvertently mailed to an American state where importation of pornography is illegal.
