= LA 399 (film) =

- DVD released by Extreme Associates
- Directed by: Rob Black
- Written by: Charles Pinion
- Produced by: Rob Black
- Starring: Jasmin St. Claire; Evan Stone; Herschel Savage; Tom Byron
- Narrated by: Evan Stone
- Cinematography: Layne Parker
- Edited by: Junior Bonner
- Music by: Glennlyn
- Production company: Extreme Associates
- Distributed by: Extreme Associates
- Release date: 1999
- Running time: 135 minutes
- Country: United States
- Language: English

LA 399 (also known as Freeway to Hell) is a 1999 American pornographic film written by Charles Pinion, directed by Rob Black, and produced and distributed by Extreme Associates. A crime drama with elements of science fiction, it stars Evan Stone and Jasmin St. Claire as Percy Blaine and Tanya, a couple who are hired by Tonino, a crime lord played by Tom Byron, to deliver cocaine to Alejandro Biscotti, a mobster played by Herschel Savage.

== Plot ==
Percy Blaine, a drug dealer, is dating a stripper named Tanya. Blaine regularly cheats on Tanya, despite his love for her, with Blaine's most recent fling being with another stripper named Stella. Blaine's boss, Tonino, orders Blaine to deliver cocaine to one of Tonino's criminal associates, Alejandro Biscotti. Tonino is jealous of Blaine's relationship with Tanya, who Tonino is secretly obsessed with, to the extent of constructing a hidden shrine to Tanya. Blaine steals half of the cocaine before setting out with Tanya to deliver the rest of the shipment (which Blaine has cut with baking powder) to Alejandro.

Elsewhere, Arthur Greedlove, an ex-government agent turned self-help guru, is picking up female hitchhikers to perform experiments on with a high-tech helmet called the "Brain Motivator." The Brain Motivator causes whoever wears it to experience intense sexual fantasies that scramble the wearer's mind, making them susceptible to anything suggested to them by Greedlove. Greedlove, when he finishes with his test subjects, dumps them in the desert outside of Los Angeles. Greedlove's latest victim is a ditzy, sex-obsessed traveling musician named Lola Monarch.

Blaine and Tanya drop the cocaine off at Alejandro's mansion and are forced to stay there for a few hours by a drug-crazed Alejandro and his molls, Sasha and Marcy. Alejandro realizes the cocaine has been tampered with and calls Tonino. Tonino catches Blaine just as Blaine is leaving Alejandro's mansion with Tanya. Alejandro orders Tonino to keep Tanya occupied by having sex with her, which Tonino is initially reluctant to do, while he tortures Blaine. After Tonino has sex with Tanya, he has a breakdown and tearfully confides in Tanya, "I just wanna be a good guy." When Tonino falls asleep, Tanya performs oral sex on the bound Blaine, then abandons him and Tonino. In the morning, Tonino drives Blaine to the outskirts of Los Angeles, forces him to dig a grave, and shoots him while a hitchhiking Tanya is picked up by Greedlove.

== Cast ==
- Jasmin St. Claire as Tanya
- Tom Byron as Tonino
- Evan Stone as Percy Blaine
- Herschel Savage as Alejandro Biscotti
- Kristi Myst as Stella
- Michael Stefano as Fantasy Man
- Juliana Sterling as Marcy
- Tracy Love as Lola Mercury
- Barrett Moore as Woman at Motel
- Kelsey Heart as Fantasy Woman
- Claudio Bergamin as Arthur Greedlove
- Venus Lamore as Sasha
- Jake Lawless as Paolo

== Production ==
LA 399 was advertised as a "summer blockbuster" and a "high-end" feature by Extreme Associates that was initially set to be co-directed by Rob Black and its writer, Charles Pinion; co-star Jamie Gillis and Jasmin St. Claire; and begin filming at the end of August 1999. Pinion left Extreme Associates before production on LA 399 began and, as a publicity stunt, faked his death by forwarding messages announcing that Charley Crow (Pinion's pornographic film pseudonym) had been found dead in a swimming pool in the San Fernando Valley. Rob Black, liking the script for LA 399, decided to direct the film on his own, declaring, "The script [for L.A. 399] is good, damn good, so it's gonna get made. Charley would want me to make that happen." Filming was moved from the end of August to mid-September. According to actor and executive producer Tom Byron, LA 399 was reedited three times due to disputes with the film's original editor, Layne Parker, whom Byron derided as "a hack director, a horrible editor and a general piece of shit" who "didn't understand a simple concept" when it came to editing LA 399.

== Reception ==
AVN opined that LA 399 felt "schizoid" but nonetheless gave the film a score of 4/5 while commending its sex scenes, the "strong acting" of Tom Byron, and the "comedic turns" of Claudio Bergamin and Tracy Love. Peter van Aarle of Cyberspace Adult Video Reviews gave LA 399 a grade of 8.54 on a scale of 6.00/10.00 while expressing distaste for it, writing, "The theme of this movie is drugs and guns. I always thought that this was a no no in a sex movie. Julianna gives a gun [a] BJ. What is this?" Shannon T. Nutt, the editorial director of Adult DVD Empire, in a review posted to Rec.Arts.Movies.Erotica, praised LA 399, stating, "Overall, this is an excellent DVD. It's one of the best movies I've seen lately, and I would recommend it to anyone. It's got everything: oral, straight, anal, threesomes, Jasmin, Kristi and a weird fat guy who picks up girls along the highway."

Tom Byron won Best Supporting Actor (Video) for his role in LA 399 at the 17th AVN Awards, where the film was also nominated for Best Video Feature.
