= Mari Possa =

American pornographic actress (born 1980)

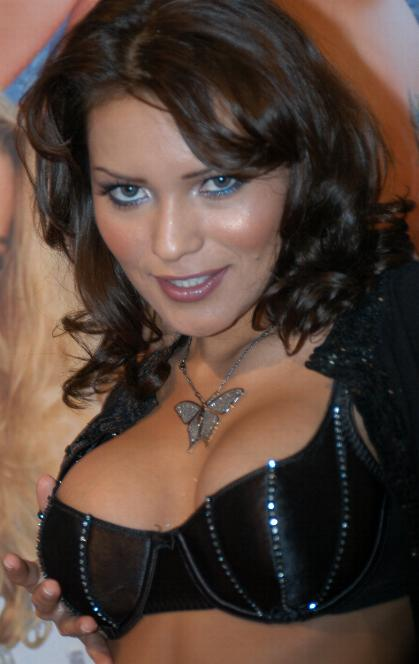
- Possa at the 2005 AVN Adult Entertainment Expo
- Born: San Miguel, El Salvador
- Occupations: Pornographic actress; reality TV personality
- Height: 5 ft 2 in (1.57 m)

Mari Possa is a Salvadoran American pornographic actress and reality TV personality.

== Early life ==
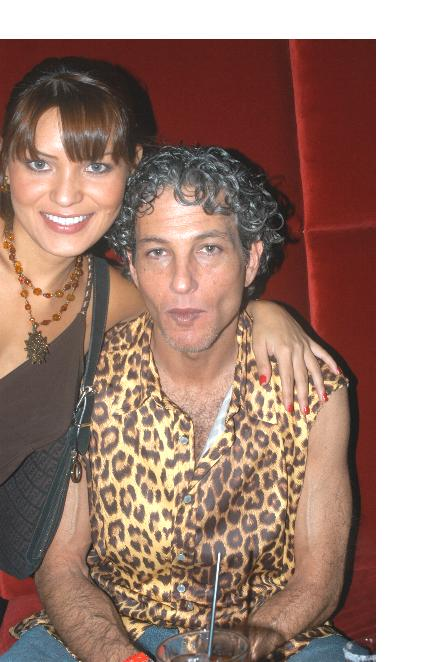
Mari Possa with her then partner Seymore Butts in 2004

Possa was born in San Miguel, El Salvador. Her family moved from El Salvador to the United States when she was nine.

== Career ==
Mari Possa was a former secretary at a law firm when she entered the adult industry as assistant of director Seymour Butts. In 2003, she became a contract girl for Seymour Butts Home Movies and Adam & Eve Pictures, and appeared in about 35 scenes until 2009. In 2009, Possa retired from the porn industry to pursue a degree in broadcasting, then made her comeback to porn in 2012 as a freelance performer for solo and lesbian scenes. Possa also appeared in the Showtime TV series Family Business and was the cover girl of the book Dirty Talk: Conversations with Porn Stars by Andrew J. Rausch and Chris Watson. Her porn name is a pun on the word mariposa, which means "butterfly" in Spanish.

== Awards ==
- 2005 AVN Award nominee – Best Group Sex Scene, Video – Anal Surprise Party
- 2006 AVN Award nominee – Best Threeway Sex Scene – House of Ass
- 2006 AVN Award nominee – Best All-Girl Sex Scene, Video – War of the Girls
- 2007 AVN Award nominee – Best Group Sex Scene, Video – Butt Pirates of the Caribbean
- 2009 AVN Award nominee – Best Threeway Sex Scene – Jenna 9.5
- 2013 XBIZ Award nomination – Performer Comeback of the Year
