= Memphis Cathouse Blues =

- Directed by: Louie Lewis
- Based on: The Best Little Whorehouse in Texas by Larry L. King & Peter Masterson
- Produced by: Elliott Lewis
- Starring: Annette Haven, Mike Horner
- Production company: Caballero Home Video
- Release date: 1982
- Running time: 1:15:41
- Language: English

Memphis Cathouse Blues is a 1982 pornographic film that is a spoof of the Broadway musical The Best Little Whorehouse in Texas, and the 1982 film it was made into, starring Burt Reynolds and Dolly Parton. Annette Haven takes over the Parton role of the madam and Mike Horner the Reynolds role as the sheriff.

== Plot ==
Madam Mavis (Annette Haven) runs a bordello in Memphis, Tennessee. Her exclusive client is Sheriff T.J. Thomson (Mike Horner), but he can't help her against Reverend Pritchit (R.J. Reynolds) who sends Deacon Davis (Herschel Savage) and Brother Pyle (Jon Martin) to demonstrate outside. At last, the demonstrators are soon lured inside to be with Angel (K.C. Valentine), Cherry (Dorothy LeMay), and Rose (Parker). Meanwhile, a woman called Tammy Sue (Danielle) knocks on the door saying someone just tried to rape her. Mavis calms her down and eventually offers her a job. She coaches her with the Sheriff. Rose reminisces about a college guy called Tommy Lee, whose brother Johnny Lee was with Dixie (Lisa De Leeuw). Per tradition, the captain of the winning football team Billy Ray then arrives and gets to be Tammy Sue's first sole client. The Sheriff offers to save the whorehouse by proposing to Mavis. Reverend Pritchit arrives personally to stop the ceremony, but his true face is exposed when Tammy Sue reveals he's the man who tried to rape her.

== Production and release ==
The film was directed by Louie Lewis for Caballero Home Video, the studio also responsible for such pornographic spoofs as 8 to 4, a spoof of the 1980 film 9 to 5 also originally starring Parton. Porn star Kay Parker, who played the prostitute Rose in the movie, had an uncredited bit role in The Best Little Whorehouse in Texas film.

Memphis Cathouse Blues was originally released in 1982, the same year as the film it was based on. A heavily cut version of the film, with a runtime of 48m 19s, was passed by the BBFC in the United Kingdom rated 18 on April 13, 1994.

== See also ==
- Golden Age of Porn
