= Bobby Vitale =

American pornographic actor (born 1965)

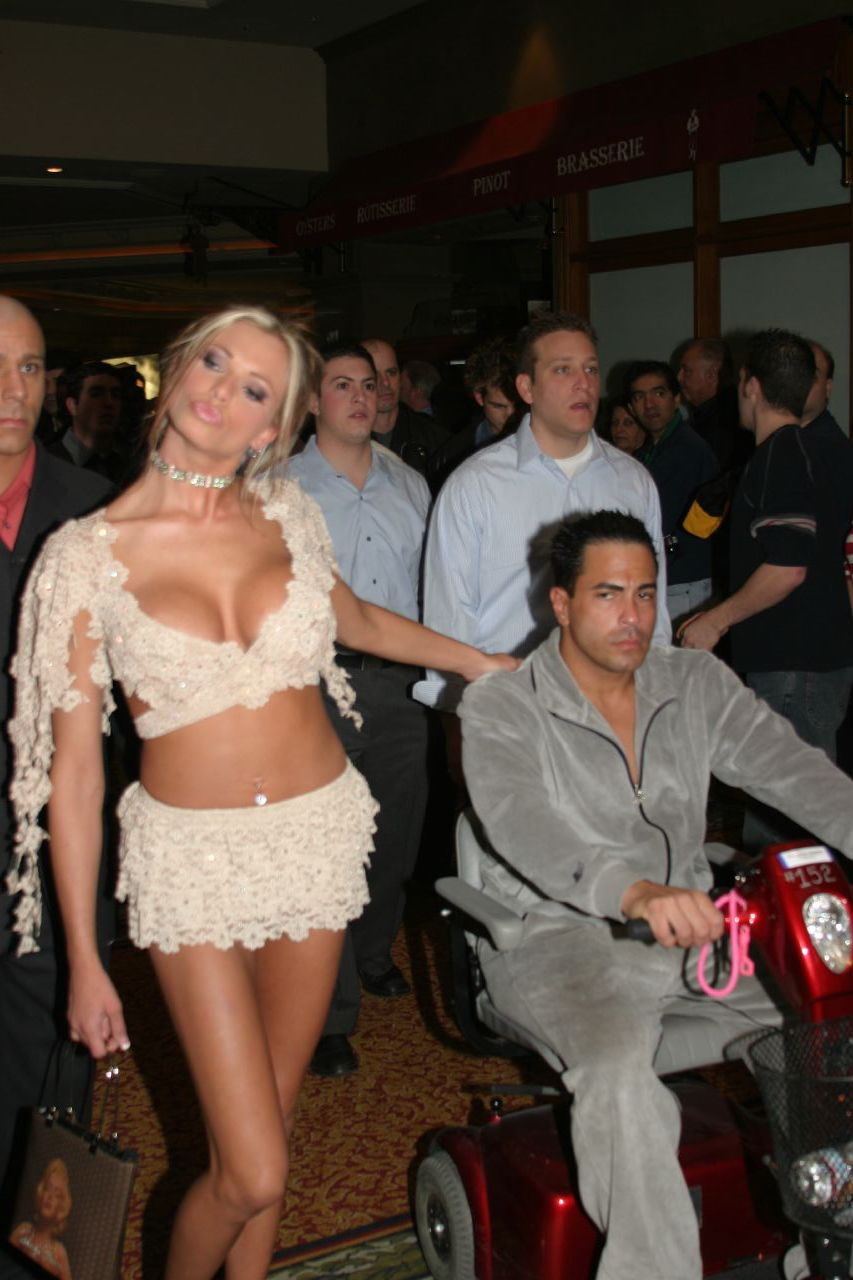
- Vitale on the right with his former girlfriend Briana Banks at the 2004 AVN Awards
- Born: Gerald R. Forde; June 30, 1965; Santa Monica, California, U.S.
- Died: August 29, 2017 (aged 52); Los Angeles, California, U.S.
- Other name: Jerry Forde
- Height: 5 ft 7 in (1.70 m)
- Spouses: Tamara Bishop (m. 1986–1990) Nikki Tyler (m. 1996–1999)
- Partner: Briana Banks (2003–2006)

Bobby Vitale, (June 30, 1965 – August 29, 2017) also known as "Jerry Forde", was an American pornographic actor of Mexican/ Irish descent. He entered the adult film industry in 1995 and performed in over 418 titles. His filmography includes films directed by John Leslie. Vitale directed two adult films.

== Personal life ==
Vitale was married to fellow porn actor Nikki Tyler from 1996 to 1998. He appeared in scenes with her. They subsequently got divorced, and Vitale later became engaged to Briana Banks in 2003, before they split up in 2006.

Vitale was the victim of a car accident in 2004 that left him with a smashed pelvis, crushed urethra and having to use a wheelchair and a colostomy bag temporarily.

Having retired in the mid 2000s, Vitale ran a body shop in Southern California for several years. He claimed to be ready to make a comeback to the porn industry in 2011, but nothing ever came of this.

He died on August 29, 2017 in Los Angeles, California, aged 52.

== Awards ==
- 2000 XRCO Award – Male Performer of the Year
- 2001 AVN Award – Best Couples Sex Scene (Film) – Facade (with Sydnee Steele)
