= John Stagliano =

American pornographic actor and director (born 1951)

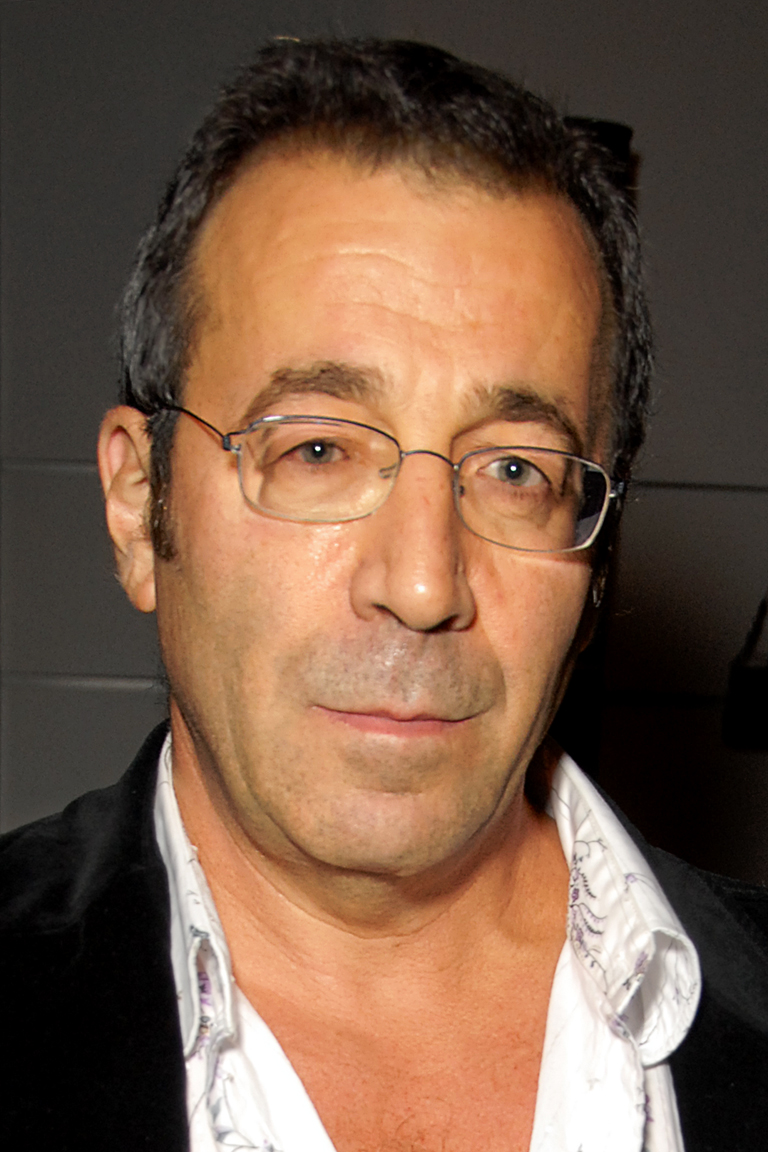
- Stagliano in 2009
- Born: November 29, 1951 (age 74); Chicago, Illinois, U.S.
- Other names: Buttman, John Stag, John Stagg, John Staglano, Jon Stagliano, Jon Stallion, Romeo Verdi
- Spouse: Tricia Devereaux (m. 2008)
- Website: buttman.com

John Stagliano (born November 29, 1951), also known as Buttman, is an American entrepreneur, former pornographic film actor, producer and director who founded and owns the Evil Angel pornographic film studio.

== Early life and career ==
Stagliano grew up in the Chicago suburbs, and attended high school from 1965 to 1969. He enrolled in college, but dropped out in 1969 for several semesters. He then went back to college and studied subjects including English, journalism, and engineering, before transferring to UCLA to major in economics. He originally planned to get an economics PhD and become a professor. He then switched to studying theater, playwriting, modern dance and jazz dance, partly because there were more women in those classes. He is of Italian ancestry with some of his grandparents from Florence.

In the 1970s, he wrote erotic fiction for a small newspaper, and did some softcore modeling. He made his debut in a hardcore pornographic film in an 8 mm loop in 1974. In 1979, he was looking for dancing jobs in Hollywood. He replied to an advertisement in the Daily Variety looking for male strippers for the new Chippendales show. He performed with the group four or five nights a week for the next four years. In 1982, when he was 30, he began publishing a small pornographic magazine on newsprint, which he called Evil Angel.

== Adult film producer ==
Initially he had little knowledge of film making, but he made his first movie for $8,000 in 1983, titled Bouncing Buns, starring Stacy Donovan. For the next six years he made films for other companies to manufacture and distribute. In 1989, he started Evil Angel to sell his own films. The origin of the company's name dates back to when Stagliano was working as a stripper. "There was another guy in one of my shows named John. So this MC started calling me Evil John to differentiate us. This was when I was doing Dracula and chains. At the same time I had a girlfriend who called herself Angel when she did strip shows. She was a very nasty girl and I suggested that she call herself Evil Angel. She didn't, but I loved the name and wound up using it for my company."

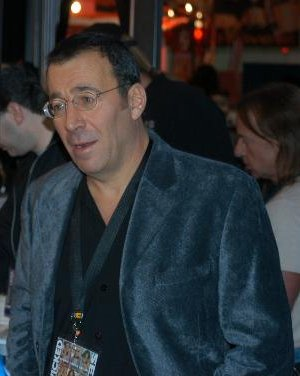
Stagliano at the 2005 AVN Expo

The first Evil Angel film was Dance Fire, filmed in 1988 by Stagliano, starring himself, Trinity Loren, and Brandy Alexandre.

=== The Adventures of Buttman ===
In 1989, he produced The Adventures of Buttman, the first in a popular series which is credited with sparking the "gonzo" adult film genre. These films involved highlighting the female buttocks, with actors often licking, kissing and playfully biting the female behind. Stagliano has stated that a scene showing Tracey Adams's buttocks inspired him to make the Buttman series of films. The clip shows Adams on her hands and knees with her rear end stuck high in the air. "The shot only lasted a couple of seconds," says Stagliano, "but I knew then what I wanted to do." Early Stagliano productions had little to no anal sex in them and were critically acclaimed for the showcasing of his buttocks fetish. Later Buttman films included numerous anal sex scenes, often featuring Stagliano himself. In the 1990s, Stagliano became one of the most successful figures in American pornographic films.

Stagliano was described by U.S. News & World Report magazine in 1998 as "the nation's leading director of hard-core videos".

He has directed series including Buttman at Nudes a Poppin', Buttman Goes to Rio, Buttman's Anal Divas, Buttman's Anal Show, Buttman's Bend Over Babes, Buttman's Bend Over Brazilian Babes, Buttman's Big Butt Backdoor Babes, Buttman's Big Tit Adventure, Buttman's Butt Freak, Buttman's European Vacation, Buttman's Favorite Big Butt Babes, Face Dance and Fashionistas, as well as numerous one-off films. Stagliano also served as mentor, producer, and co-director to Tristan Taormino in her video version of The Ultimate Guide to Anal Sex for Women.

=== Fashionistas ===
From October 2004 through February 2008, Stagliano produced and directed a Las Vegas show called Fashionistas based on his porn film of the same name. In 2008, he won the 'Best Director – Video' award for Fashionistas Safado: Berlin. ("Safado" is a Portuguese word meaning lewd or salacious.)

=== Obscenity trial ===
On April 8, 2008, Evil Angel and Stagliano were indicted on federal obscenity charges by a federal grand jury in Washington, D.C. The scenes selected by the government to support the prosecution involved urination, use of enemas, and bondage. The involved movies are:

- Milk Nymphos: directed by Jay Sin
- Storm Squirters 2: directed by Joey Silvera
- Belladonna's Fetish Fantasy 5: directed by Belladonna

On July 16, 2010, a federal trial began in Washington, D.C., with Stagliano as defendant and after three days all charges were dismissed. Judge Richard J. Leon stated, "I hope the government will learn a lesson from its experience," and called the evidence linking Stagliano to the production and distribution of the DVD videos "woefully insufficient". Although he dismissed the charges on the grounds of insufficient evidence, the judge cited the "difficult, challenging and novel questions" raised in the case against Stagliano, questions concerning extant federal obscenity-statutes, the Internet, free speech, and the rights of criminal defendants. He stated that he hoped "[higher] courts and Congress will give greater guidance to judges in whose courtrooms these cases will be tried."

=== HIV lawsuit ===
Stagliano was diagnosed with HIV in January 1997.

In a June 2013 lawsuit filed in Los Angeles Superior Court against Stagliano and his company Evil Angel, adult performer Katie Summers alleged "negligence, intentional infliction of emotional distress, sexual battery and violations of professions code section 17200" because Stagliano didn't inform her of his HIV positive status prior to her performing in the 2010 movie Buttman's Stretch Class 4. According to the lawsuit, Summers consented to Stagliano engaging in sexual contact within the context of her acting in an adult film. In the scene, Stagliano can be seen handing Summers sex toys and touching her buttocks, but he does not perform hardcore sex with her. Summers claims that had she known of Stagliano's status prior to the scene, she would not have done it.

In a press interview, Stagliano's wife Karen disputes the allegations: "John and the company feel that he did not do anything with Katie Summers that would warrant having to inform her of his HIV status," Karen said "He had no genital contact with her, no sexual touching of her genitals at all that would have put her at any sort of a medical risk whatsoever."

The suit against Stagliano went into forced arbitration and the plaintiff had her deposition taken, but on September 29, 2014 Summers dropped her lawsuit. According to Stagliano's attorney, Paul Cambria, "[Summers] had no case. I took her testimony and when I was done I could not see any possible way for her to succeed."

=== Scene with Ginger Banks and Jenny Blighe ===
In 2018, Stagliano directed an Evil Angel scene between Ginger Banks and Jenny Blighe. It was both performers' first scene, after working as webcam models, and they were told the scene would only the involve the two women, not any men. According to Banks and Blighe, Stagliano touched their buttocks without their consent during the filming, in character as Buttman. Stagliano said the pair had been asked to watch a previous scene in which he did a similar thing; Banks and Blighe said that they had concerns after watching the scene, but the production told Banks that Stagliano would not perform as Buttman.

After Blighe made her experience public, Banks began experiencing online harassment due to her initial response. She voluntarily stood down as chair of the Adult Performer Advocacy Committee in the aftermath. Banks later filed a report of sexual battery against Stagliano and apologized to Blighe both privately and publicly, saying in 2020, "I should be held accountable for my part in the gaslighting and denying her reality". She said that Stagliano mocked her over the incident afterwards, and that she was told by others of similar incidents to her and Blighe's account.

== Critical appraisal ==
In her essay Crackers and Whackers: The White Trash of Porn, Constance Penley asserts that John Stagliano did for anal fetishism what Woody Allen did for neurosis, pointing out that, "as in so many stag films", Buttman is the "butt of the joke" since, "seeking the perfect shot of a woman's perfect ass", the character "gets mugged, evicted, bankrupted, rejected, and ridiculed – all in his single-minded quest for perfection".

== Awards and nominations ==
- 1998 Hot d'Or d'Honneur winner
- 2003 Barcelona International Erotic Film Festival's Lifetime Career Award
- 2009 Hot d'Or Award winner of Best American Director award for Fashionistas Safado Berlin (for Evil Angel/Marc Dorcel productions)
- 2010 XBIZ winner of Industry Pioneer award
- 2011 XBIZ winner of Man of the Year award
- 2013 XBIZ nominated for the Director of the Year award for Voracious
- Porn Block of Fame

== Personal life ==
Stagliano was in a relationship with pornographic actress Krysti Lynn (A.K.A Shawna Yager) during 1993. She was driving Stagliano's Acura Legend when she died on December 7, 1995, in an accident in Calabasas.

In 1997, Stagliano tested positive for HIV. As of 2002, medication has kept the virus in check.

He married former porn star Tricia Devereaux (a.k.a. Karen Stagliano) in 2008.

Stagliano espouses a libertarian political philosophy, and has been a significant financial contributor to the Cato Institute and the Reason Foundation, both libertarian think tanks.
