= Ginger Banks =

American pornographic film actress (born 1990/1991)

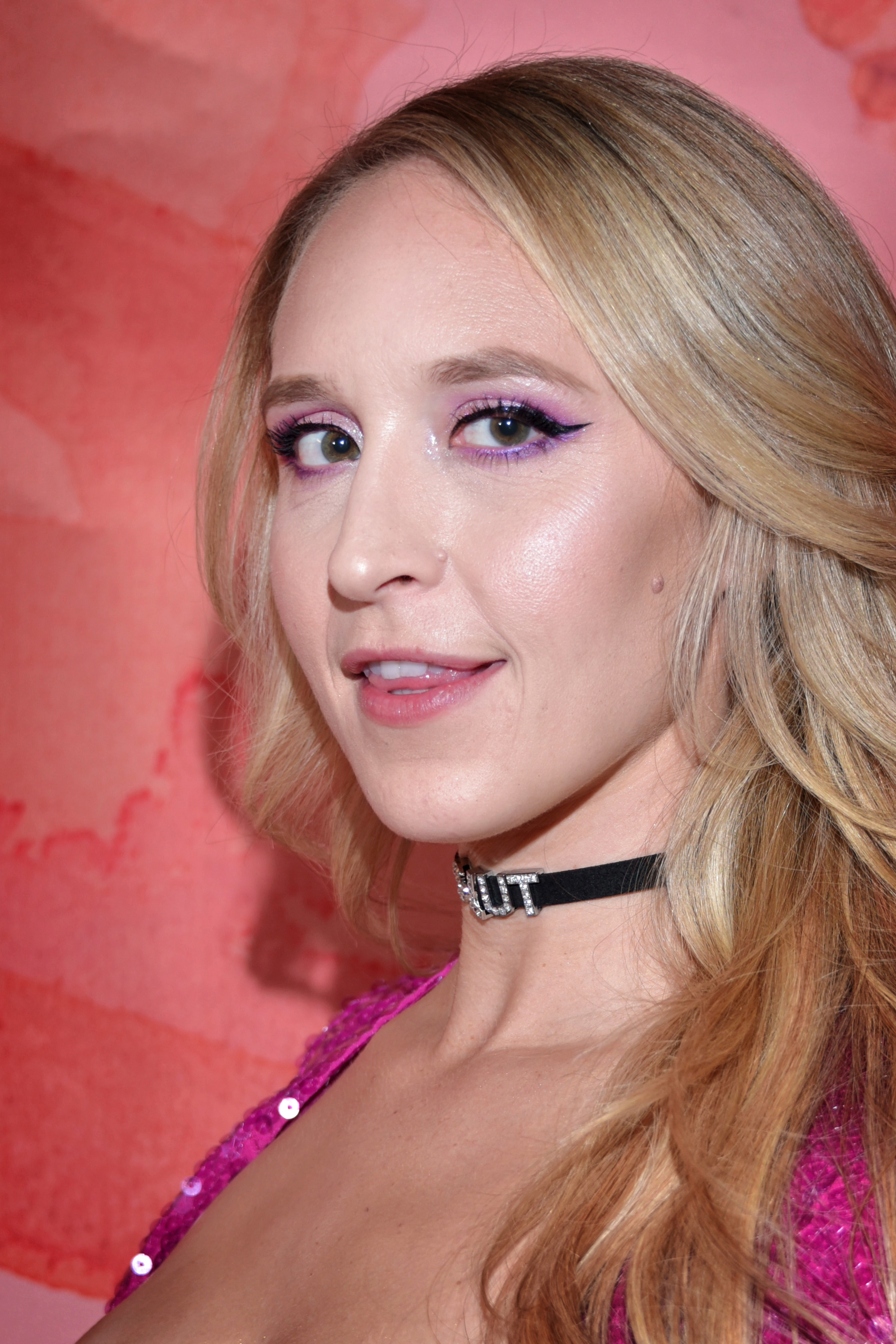
- Banks in 2019
- Born: May 30, 1990 (age 36)
- Education: Arizona State University (dropped out)
- Occupations: Model; actress; advocate
- Years active: 2010–present

Ginger Banks (born 1990 or 1991) is an American webcam model, pornographic film actress and sex worker advocate.

== Career ==
Banks started webcamming in 2010 at the age of 19 while studying chemical engineering. Initially, Banks was ashamed to disclose her career and lied about her job; this contributed to her suffering from depression. She eventually quit school not wanting to deal with the reactions of her peers after she became popular. She became an advocate who speaks out about the damaging and discriminatory treatment that sex workers in the industry regularly face.

In 2018, Banks alleged that John Stagliano, the owner of Evil Angel, had groped her without her consent while directing a scene. In June 2020, Banks filed a police report against Stagliano over the alleged groping.

Banks was one of the targets of a harassment campaign against pornography performers by an Instagram user. Instagram had disabled her account in November 2018, and the user took credit for her deactivation through reporting her and others for violating its community guidelines. Her account was reactivated months later, and Banks admitted censoring her postings due to her wariness at being deactivated again. She believes that removing sex workers from social media marginalizes them by removing their marketing channels.

== Advocacy ==
In June 2017, Banks posted a video on YouTube that compiled allegations of sexual assault against Ron Jeremy by members of the adult industry. While the allegations against Jeremy have stemmed back decades, her video and the attention prompted by the Harvey Weinstein sexual abuse allegations spurred notice outside the industry. Banks was motivated to take a stand against Jeremy after speaking with dozens of women who alleged he had assaulted them at conventions and learning that others had known about and normalized these incidents with a, "Yeah, that's Ron." Jeremy argued that Banks' video compiled allegations that distorted the interactions with the women who had "buyer's remorse." Jeremy was banned from several industry shows after Banks' social media campaign and the Free Speech Coalition, an industry trade group, rescinded its Positive Image Award that it had originally presented to him in 2009. According to Banks, the allegations have raised conversations about consent in the adult industry and debunked the notion that sex workers cannot be victims of sexual assault.

Banks made a video in 2018 urging Bernie Sanders to reevaluate his position after he had voted in support of the Stop Enabling Sex Traffickers Act and Fight Online Sex Trafficking Act (SESTA/FOSTA). She discussed the dangers that SESTA/FOSTA would create for the sex work industry and asked him to consider fighting for the rights of sex workers.

Banks started a petition demanding that Mindgeek remove Porn Fidelity videos from its tube platforms after accusations of sexual misconduct surfaced against producer Ryan Madison by several performers. The Porn Fidelity and Teen Fidelity channels were removed from Pornhub, but their videos were still findable on Mindgeek sites.

Banks and other sex workers spoke out against the intentions of TraffickingHub's campaign to shut Pornhub down. The campaign had accused Pornhub of exploiting and profiting from sex trafficking and other non-consensual content exploiting women and children. TraffickingHub's parent organization, Exodus Cry, opposes the decriminalization or legalization of sex work and seeks to abolish porn. Sex-work advocates accuse the group of peddling a narrative of sex workers as victims. Banks started a petition for Pornhub to improve its verification process so that content cannot be uploaded without the creator's consent.
