= Seymore Butts =

American pornographic filmmaker (born 1964)

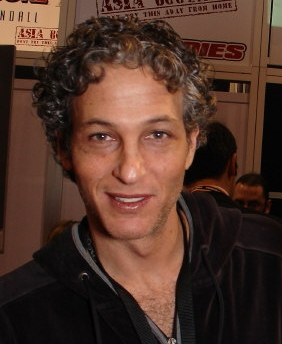
- Seymore Butts, January 2007
- Born: Adam Glasser; March 18, 1964 (age 62); New York City, U.S.
- Other names: Bubba Brando, Bubba Butts
- Years active: 1980–present
- Height: 6 ft 1.5 in (1.87 m)
- Spouse: Taylor Hayes (1996–1997)

Adam Glasser (born March 18, 1964), known professionally as Seymore Butts, is an American pornographic film director, producer, and occasional performer who has produced hundreds of films in the gonzo genre of pornography.

== Life and career ==
Butts was born to Jewish parents in the Bronx, New York City. After making several appearances as a supporting actor in the late 1980s, including a role in an early "Buttman" video, featuring Matthew King, by John Stagliano (Buttman's Ultimate Workout, 1991), Glasser adopted the popular gag name Seymore Butts ("see more butts") as a pseudonym and began producing his own videos in the early 1990s after founding the Seymore, Inc. studio. The Seymore Butts series won "Best Gonzo Series" at the 1999 and 2000 AVN Awards.

During 2001–02, Glasser was the focus of an obscenity-based court case, People of the State of California v. Adam Glasser, et al. over the depiction of vaginal fisting in his 1999 video Tampa Tushy Fest 1. The film won the "Best All-Girl Sex Scene – Video" award at the 2000 AVN Awards. Glasser pleaded not guilty to violating California Penal Code Sections 311.2(a), "production, distribution or exhibition of obscene matter"; and 311.5, "advertising or promoting matter represented to be obscene", better known as "pandering obscenity". Then before trial, he reached a plea agreement in which his company pleaded "no contest" to "creating a public nuisance", and paid a $1,000 fine, in exchange for all other obscenity charges being dropped against the defendants.

Beginning in 2003, Glasser's life was the focus of Showtime's popular reality TV program Family Business. Appearing with him were his mother, Lila Glasser, and his 60-year-old cousin, Stevie Glasser (a.k.a. "Cousin Stevie"), both of whom help Adam run the "family business" of the series—the Seymore Butts porn "empire". During production of Family Business, Glasser made reference to the court case, and used this as a springboard to mount a successful Internet-based telethon to raise money for freedom of speech causes. The series also focused on his life as a single father and his difficulty as a porn star in finding a meaningful relationship outside the industry. The series ran for five seasons.

Glasser's Do-It-Yourself Porn (2008) is one of a number of how-to guides on shooting porn videos that were released in the 2000s.

Glasser is featured in the PBS Frontline documentary on pornography.

== Awards and industry recognition ==
- 1999 AVN Awards Win – 'Best Gonzo Series' for Seymore Butts
- 2000 AVN Awards Win – 'Best Gonzo Series' for Seymore Butts
- 2013 XBIZ Award Nomination – 'Director of the Year – Non-Feature Release' for Pool Party at Seymore's Vol.3
