= Alisha Klass =

American pornographic film actress

- Klass in 2001
- Occupation: Pornographic film actress

Alisha Klass is an American former pornographic film actress.

== Career ==
Klass began starring in pornographic movies around 1997, becoming the best known collaborator with director Seymore Butts, aka Adam Glasser, to whom she was once engaged. Klass had a tattoo on her rear reading "Seymore Butts." However, following an acrimonious break up in 2000 she has since had it covered with a dolphin.

Tampa Tushy Fest, Part 1, a 1998 video featuring Klass in a lesbian double fisting scene with Chloe Nicole, resulted in Glasser being charged with obscenity. Glasser pleaded public nuisance charge as part of an agreement with the Los Angeles city attorney's office on March 20, 2002. He also paid a fine of $1,000.

=== Appearances ===
Klass had a brief cameo as a cheerleader in the movie Cruel Intentions in 1999. She appeared briefly as a dancer in the 2001 independent film The Center of the World.

== Personal life ==
Klass was engaged to Seymore Butts and briefly dated sports agent Dan Lozano.

== Awards ==
- 1998 NightMoves Award – Best New Starlet (Editor's Choice)
- 1998 XRCO Award – Best Anal/DP Scene for Behind the Sphinc Door
- 1999 XRCO Award – Best Anal/DP Scene for Tushy Heaven
- 1999 XRCO Award – Best Girl-Girl Scene for Tampa Tushy Fest 1
- 1999 AVN Award – Best Anal Sex Scene – Video for Tushy Heaven
- 1999 AVN Award – Best Group Sex Scene – Video for Tushy Heaven
- 1999 AVN Award – Best New Starlet
- 1999 F.O.X.E Award – Female Fan Favorite
- 1999 NightMoves Award – Best Actress (Fan's Choice)
- 2000 AVN Award – Best All-Girl Sex Scene – Video for Tampa Tushy Fest
- 2007 NightMoves Hall of Fame inductee
- 2012 AVN Hall of Fame inductee
