= Ron Jeremy =

American pornographic actor (born 1953)

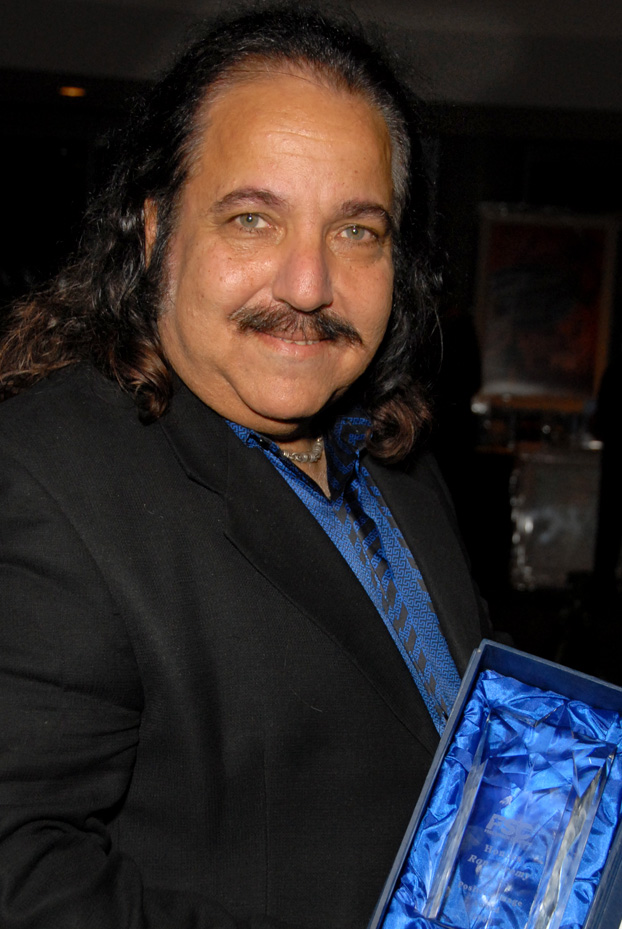
- Jeremy in 2009
- Born: Ronald Jeremy Hyatt; March 12, 1953 (age 73); Queens, New York, U.S.
- Other names: R. J.; David Elliot; Big Daddy; The Hedgehog; Ronnie
- Education: Queens College, City University of New York (BA, MA)
- Occupations: Pornographic actor; writer; filmmaker; actor
- Years active: 1977–2018
- Height: 5 ft 6 in (1.68 m)

Ronald Jeremy Hyatt (born March 12, 1953) is an American former pornographic actor. Nicknamed "The Hedgehog", he was ranked by AVN at No. 1 in their "50 Top Porn Stars of All Time" list. He has also made a number of non-pornographic media appearances, and director Scott J. Gill filmed a documentary about him and his legacy, Porn Star: The Legend of Ron Jeremy, released in 2001.

Jeremy was accused of sexual assault more than a dozen times between 2017 and 2020, for incidents stretching back to 2004. Upon further investigation, in August 2021, he was indicted on 30 sexual-assault counts involving 21 victims including 12 counts of forcible rape. He was initially jailed awaiting trial, but in January 2023, a judge found him mentally unfit to stand trial due to "incurable neurocognitive decline"; he was released to a private residence in November 2023.

== Early life ==
Ronald Jeremy Hyatt was born in Queens, New York City, to a middle-class Jewish family from Russia and Poland. His father, Arnold (born 1918), was a physicist and professor at Queens College, CUNY, and his mother a book editor who had served in the O.S.S. during World War II, as she spoke fluent German and French.

Jeremy graduated from Benjamin N. Cardozo High School. After high school, he attended Queens College (part of the City University of New York), where he majored in theater and education as an undergraduate and completed a master's degree.

== Pornography career ==
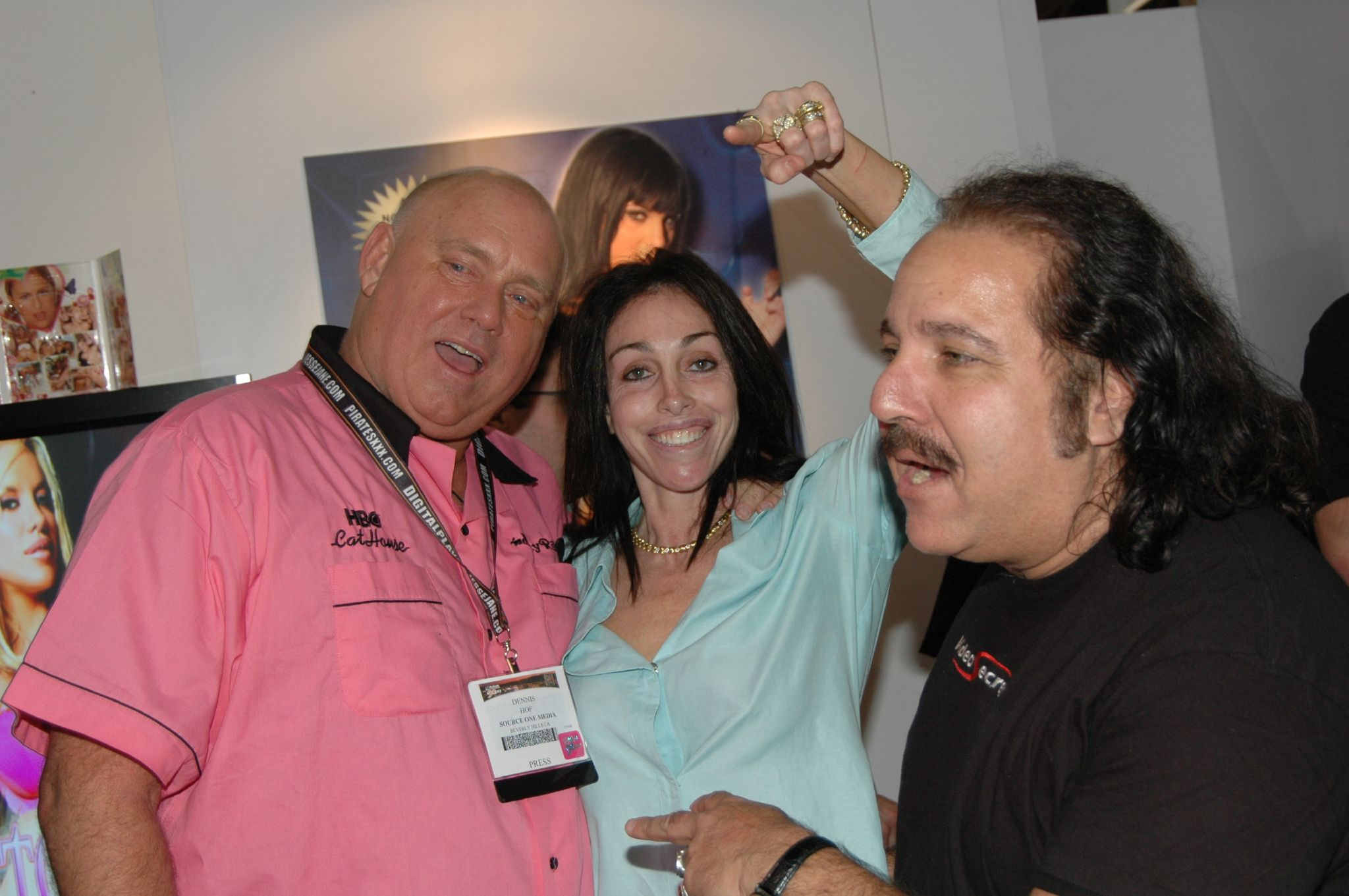
Dennis Hof, Heidi Fleiss, and Jeremy at the Adult Video Network Convention in Las Vegas, 2006

Jeremy left the teaching profession (he called it his "ace in the hole") to pursue a legitimate acting career on Broadway. He said that he learned then what it was like to be broke, making no money as an actor who "starved Off-Broadway". He soon found work posing for Playgirl after his then-girlfriend submitted his photo to the magazine. He utilized this opportunity as a springboard into the adult film industry, which he viewed as a reliable means of supporting himself. Initially using his surname Hyatt, he later changed to using his middle name Jeremy as his professional name, as his grandmother Rose (listed in the telephone directory as R Hyatt) was receiving nuisance phone calls after the Playgirl spread was published.

Jeremy had the nickname "The Hedgehog" bestowed upon him by fellow porn actor William Margold in 1979 after a situation on the set of the porn film Olympic Fever. Jeremy flew in from New York to shoot the movie. Expecting warm California weather, he wore only a T-shirt and shorts and brought no additional clothing. During the long motorcycle ride to the set, located near Lake Arrowhead, in the California mountains, the weather deteriorated to blizzard conditions, which chilled him to the point of near hypothermia. Upon arriving at the set, Jeremy was immediately whisked away to thaw out in a hot shower. When he finished, his skin had taken on a pinkish hue from the temperature extremes, and all the many hairs on his body were standing on end. Margold's comment upon seeing Jeremy at that moment was "You are a hedgehog, my friend. A walking, talking hedgehog." Contrary to popular belief, the nickname had nothing to do with his weight, as he was quite physically fit at the time.

Jeremy is listed in the Guinness Book of World Records for "Most Appearances in Adult Films"; his entry on the Internet Adult Film Database lists more than 2,000 films in which he has performed, and an additional 285 films which he directed. By way of comparison, John Holmes, the next highest-ranked male star on the AVN Top 50 porn stars, has 384 acting credits listed on the IAFD.

One joke that made the rounds within the industry at the time was "the kinkier acts some actresses would not perform were bestiality, sadomasochism, and sex with Jeremy" because he had an atypical appearance for a porn star.

In 2006, Jeremy began a series of debates on pornography opposing Pastor Craig Gross, founder of anti-pornography website XXXchurch.com, visiting various U.S. and Canada college campuses as part of the "Porn Debate Tour".

== Personal life ==
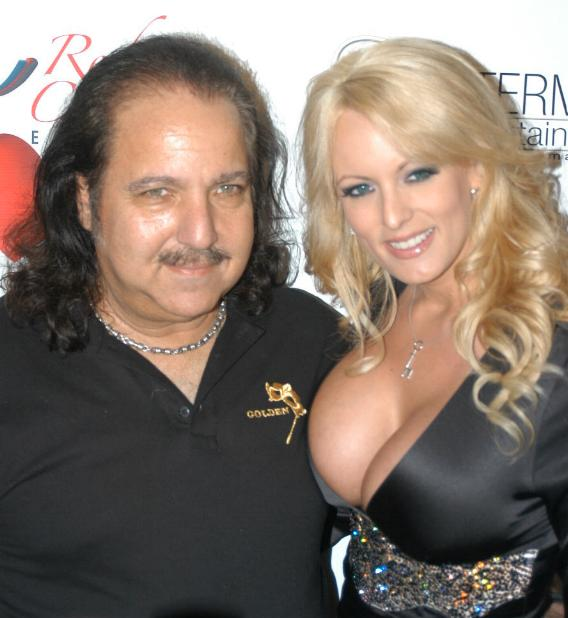
Jeremy and Stormy Daniels at Jeremy's birthday party in March 2007

On January 29, 2013, Jeremy drove himself to Cedars-Sinai Medical Center after experiencing severe chest pain. Doctors discovered an aneurysm near his heart and he was operated on the following day. Three weeks later, he was released from the hospital.

It was reported in early 2023 by The Daily Beast that Jeremy suffered from "severe dementia", as determined by mental health experts who evaluated him following his arrest.

=== Sexual assault allegations ===
More than a dozen women have publicly accused Jeremy of sexual assault. Several of the allegations relate to his appearances at fan conventions, alleging that he would grope and insert his fingers into attendees without their consent. The organizers of the Exxxotica national adult conventions permanently banned Jeremy from their shows in October 2017 after a June 2017 social media campaign by webcam model Ginger Banks. Due to the allegations, the Free Speech Coalition, an industry trade group, rescinded its Positive Image Award, which it had presented to him in 2009. In November 2017, adult performer Jessica Drake gave an interview to Rolling Stone, and commented regarding the allegations surrounding Ron Jeremy: "I have viewed [Ron Jeremy] as the missing stair in the adult community."

In June 2020, Jeremy was charged with four counts of rape and sexual assault by the Los Angeles County District Attorney's Office. He was accused of raping a 25-year-old woman at a home in West Hollywood in May 2014. He also allegedly sexually assaulted two women, ages 33 and 46, on separate occasions at a West Hollywood bar in 2017, and is accused of raping a 30-year-old woman at the same bar in July 2019. Many of the alleged assaults occurred at the Rainbow Bar and Grill where Jeremy was a regular. Owner of Golden Artists Entertainment, Dante Rusciolelli, announced they were dropping Jeremy as a client following the charges. On June 27, Jeremy pleaded not guilty to all charges. Jeremy posted his response to the charges on Twitter saying: "I am innocent of all charges. I can't wait to prove my innocence in court! Thank you to everyone for all the support."

Three days after Jeremy was initially charged, prosecutors said they had an additional 25 allegations of misconduct involving Jeremy had been made, 13 of which had occurred in Los Angeles County. Subsequently, six additional women who worked in the adult entertainment industry came forward stating that Jeremy had raped or abused them. In July 2020, a law enforcement official confirmed that the Los Angeles County Sheriff's Department had received 30 new allegations of forcible rape and groping against Jeremy involving incidents that took place in Los Angeles County since 2000.

In August 2020, Los Angeles prosecutors filed 20 further counts against Jeremy, including charges of rape, sexual assault, sodomy, and forcible penetration by foreign object. The charges involved 12 different women ranging in age from 15 to 54 years old in incidents from 2004 to 2020. One woman stated that Jeremy sexually assaulted her at a party in Santa Clarita in June 2004 when she was 15. The most recent incident is said to have occurred on January 1, 2020, when a 21-year-old woman said that Jeremy sexually assaulted her outside of a business in Hollywood. Six other women accused Jeremy of sexually assaulting them inside a West Hollywood bar he frequented, and another woman said that he assaulted her in the bar's parking lot. Jeremy, who originally had bail set at $6.6 million when first charged in June, was placed into custody at Twin Towers Correctional Facility. On August 25, 2021, he was indicted on a total of 30 sexual-assault counts involving 21 women.

The BBC documentary Ron Jeremy: Fall of a Porn Icon charting the history of allegations against Ron Jeremy and featuring interviews with some of Ron Jeremy's alleged victims, including porn actresses Ginger Banks and Tana Lee, premiered in November 2021.

On March 17, 2022, Jeremy's trial was suspended pending a mental health examination, after Jeremy was reported to be "incoherent" and unable to recognize his own lawyer, and was subsequently transferred to a mental health facility.

On January 17, 2023, Jeremy was found by the judge to be mentally unfit to stand trial due to "incurable neurocognitive decline". On February 8, 2023, he was committed to a state mental health facility in California after being found incompetent to stand trial on rape and other charges, with a progress report hearing scheduled for May 8, 2023. Per California law, the Los Angeles district attorney's office stated that Jeremy can be committed for up to two years. While waiting in jail for assignment to a state medical facility for months on November 17, 2023, a judge granted a request to release Jeremy to a private residence where he will receive care.

On August 21, 2023, a lawsuit was filed by two women against the Rainbow Bar and Grill. The women alleged that employees knew Jeremy sexually assaulted women there, including themselves, and allowed him to do so. On April 15, 2025, it was announced that a global settlement was reached with at least nine women who were suing the Rainbow Bar and Grill. Many of Jeremy's accusers will receive financial compensation after Jeremy was found not competent to stand trial.

== Awards ==
- 1983 AFAA Award – Best Supporting Actor (Suzie Superstar)
- 1984 AFAA Award – Best Supporting Actor Award (All the way in)
- 1986 AVN Award – Best Supporting Actor—Film (Candy Stripers II)
- 1991 AVN Award – Best Supporting Actor—Video (Playin' Dirty)
- 2012 AVN Award – Crossover Star of the Year
- 2004 AFWG Award – Crossover Performer of the Year
- 2004 FICEB Award – Best Actor (The Magic Sex Genie – International film group)
- 2006 F.A.M.E. Award – Favorite Adult Actor
- Porn Block of Fame

== See also ==
- Golden Age of Porn
- Porn Star: The Legend of Ron Jeremy

== Bibliography ==
- Jeremy, Ron; Spitznagel, Eric (2007). Ron Jeremy: The Hardest (Working) Man in Showbiz. New York: HarperEntertainment. ISBN 978-0-06-084082-2. OCLC 70046039. Published February 2007.
