= List of pornographic film actors who have appeared in mainstream films =

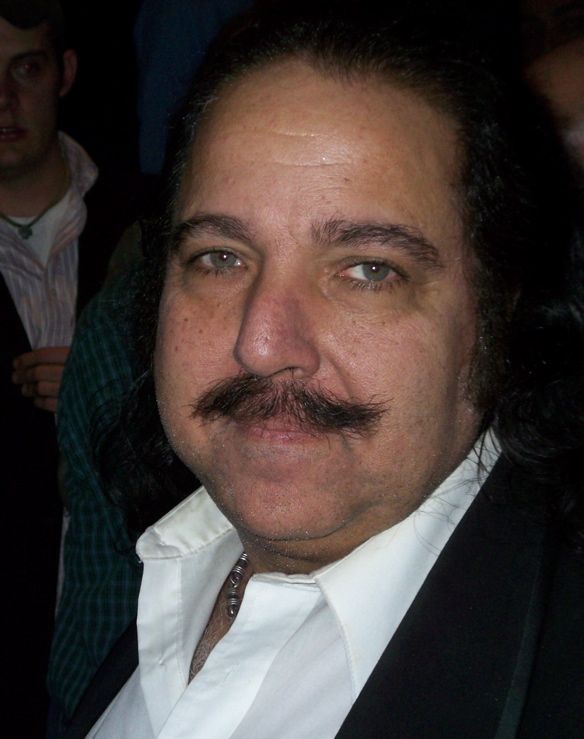
Ron Jeremy

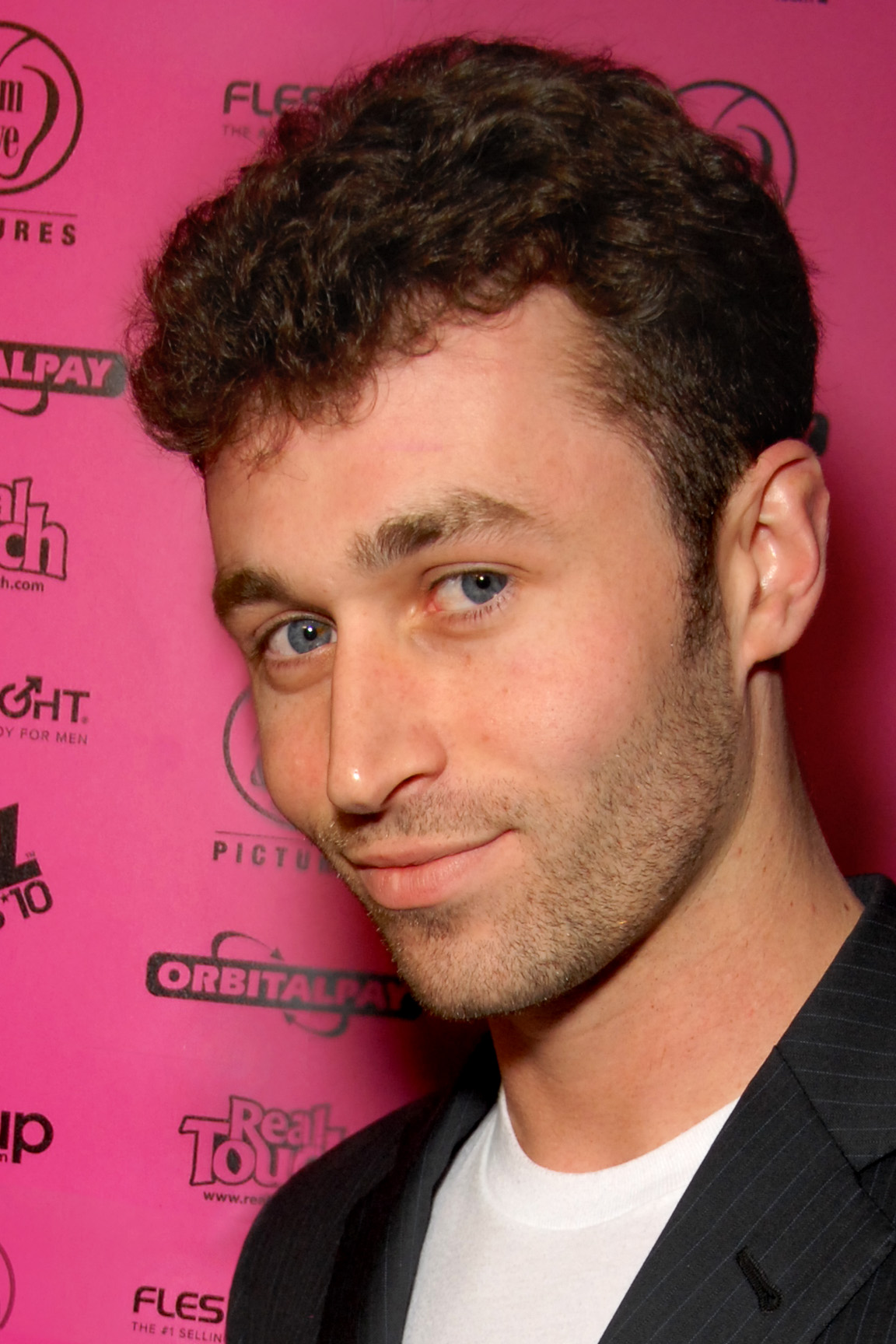
James Deen

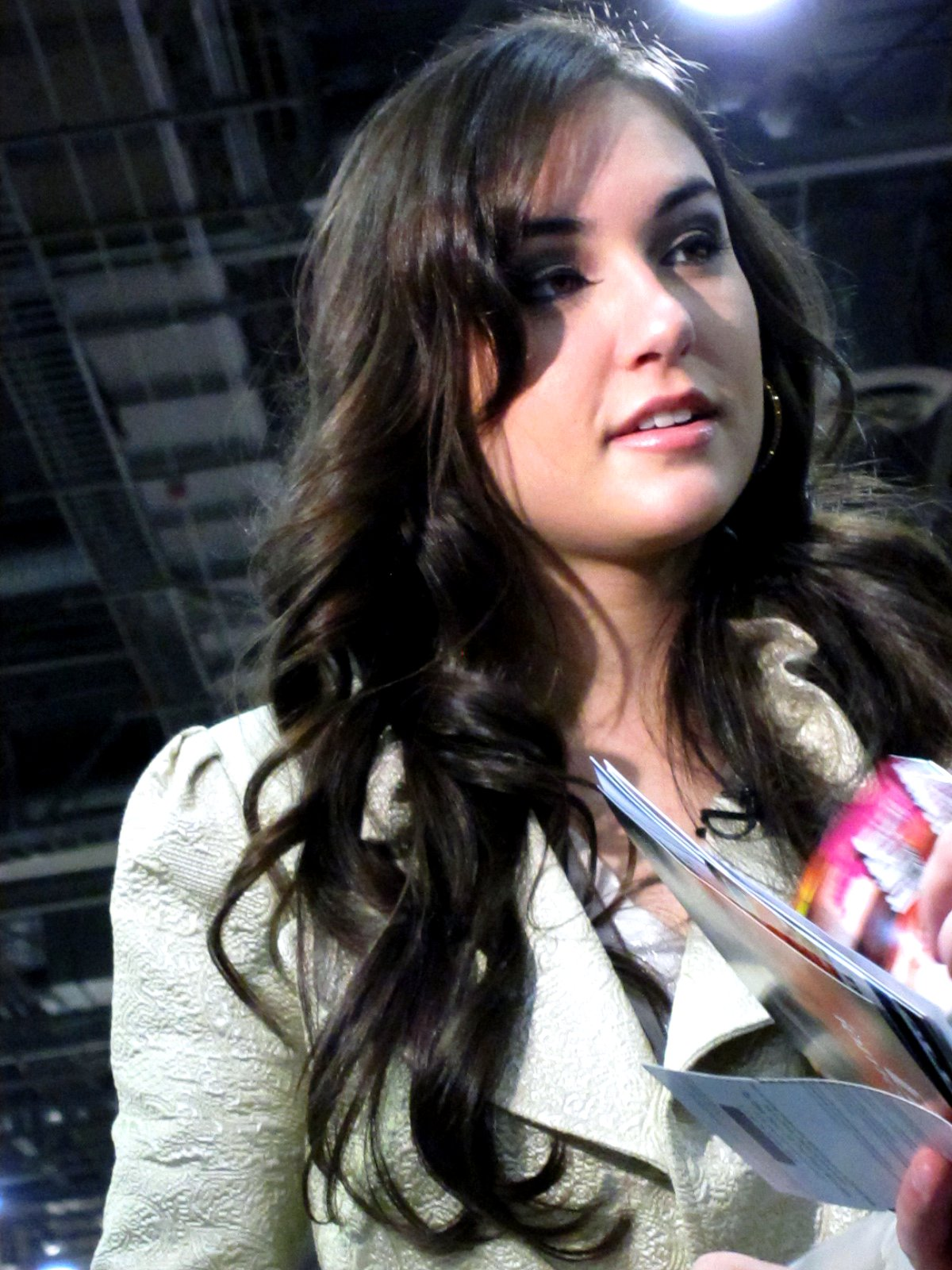
Sasha Grey

Pornographic film actors who have appeared in mainstream films, both during and after their adult film careers

Since the 1970s, there have been a number of adult film actors who have appeared in mainstream films with varying degrees of success. Adult film actors Marilyn Chambers and Linda Lovelace tried crossing over to mainstream careers in the 1970s, but had little success. Chambers did work with David Cronenberg in 1977's horror film Rabid, which went on to achieve cult success. Former adult film star Traci Lords appeared in John Waters' films Cry-Baby and Serial Mom, and Lords also appeared in the comedy film Zack and Miri Make a Porno. The gay pornographic star Johnny Hazzard more recently appeared in the mainstream gay drama Tiger Orange.

Jenna Jameson played a radio guest in the Howard Stern biopic Private Parts, while Sasha Grey was the female lead in The Girlfriend Experience. In 2013, James Deen played the male lead in The Canyons, an indie film written by Bret Easton Ellis, with Lindsay Lohan playing the female lead.

The following is a list of pornographic film actors who have appeared in non-pornographic films, including the year they first appeared in a mainstream film.

== List ==
Pornography actor / actress	Non-pornographic film title(s)	Year of debut
Abigail Clayton	Bye Bye Monkey (1978); Maniac (1980); So Fine (1981)	1978
Aino Kishi	Samurai Princess (2009)	2009
Alexis Texas	Bikini Frankenstein (2010)	2010
Aliya Brynn	The Dresden Sun (2026)	2026
Amber Lynn	52 Pick-Up (1986)	1986
Ana Foxxx	Tangerine (2015)	2015
Anette Dawn	8mm 2 (2005)	2005
Angela White	Pizza Series 5 (2007)	2007
Annette Haven	10 (1979)	1979
April Rayne	Hold Me, Thrill Me, Kiss Me (1992)	1992
Asa Akira	Starlet (2012)	2012
Ashley Lane	The Chair Company (2025)	2025
Ashlyn Gere	Evil Laugh (1986) (as Kim McKamy); Creepozoids (1987) (as Kim McKamy); Lunch Meat (1987) (as Kim McKamy); Fatal Instinct (1992) (as Kim McKamy); The X-Files – Episode Blood (1994); The One (2001) (as Kimberly Patton); Willard (2003) (as Kimberly Patton)	1986
Ashlynn Brooke	Piranha 3D (2010)	2010
Asia Carrera	The Big Lebowski (1998)	1998
Aurora Snow	The Rules of Attraction (2002); Superbad (extra scene) (2007); Co-Ed Confidential (2007)	2002
Barbara Dare	Evil Toons (1992)	1992
Belladonna	Inherent Vice (2014)	2014
Bree Olson	Purgatory Comics (2009); The Human Centipede 3 (Final Sequence) (2015)	2009
Brent Corrigan	Another Gay Sequel: Gays Gone Wild! (2008); Chillerama (2011)	2008
Bridget Powers	Confessions of a Dangerous Mind (2002); S.W.A.T. (2003); Tiptoes (2003); Cain and Abel (2006); Wristcutters: A Love Story (2006); I Hope They Serve Beer in Hell (2009); Big Money Rustlas (2010)	2002
Brigitte Lahaie	The Grapes of Death (1978); Fascination (1979); I as in Icarus (1979); Faceless (1988); Henry & June (1990); Calvaire (2004)	1978
Brooke Johnson	The Dresden Sun (2026)	2026
Candida Royalle	10 (1979)	1979
Charmane Star	Black Dynamite (2009)	2009
Chloe Cherry	Euphoria (2022)	2015
Crissy Moran	Murder-Set-Pieces (2004)	2004
Dana DeArmond	Loveless in Los Angeles (2007)	2005
Dany Verissimo	District 13 (2004); Gradiva (2006)	2004
Ed Powers	Crank: High Voltage (2009)	2009
Eliska Cross	Black Venus (2010)	2010
Emily Willis	Divinity (2023)	2023
Éva Henger	E adesso sesso (2001); Torno a vivere da solo (2008)	2001
François Sagat	Saw VI (2009); Man at Bath (2010)	2009
Fred J. Lincoln	The Last House on the Left (1972)	1972
Georgina Spelvin	Police Academy (1984); Police Academy 3: Back in Training (1986)	1984
Gianna Michaels	Piranha 3D (2010)	2010
Gina Lynn	Analyze That (2002); Minghags: The Movie (2009); Reality Horror Night (2009); Mancation (2012)	2002
Ginger Lynn	Vice Academy 1–6 (1988–1997); Young Guns II (1990); Whore (1991); Leather Jackets (1992); American Pie Presents: Band Camp (2005); The Devil's Rejects (2005)	1988
Harry Reems	Luna di miele in tre (1976); Demented (1980)	1976
Heather Hunter	Frankenhooker (1990); He Got Game (1998); The Black Ninja (2003)	1990
Holly Sampson	Pump Up the Volume (1990); Gia (1998); Staying on Top (2002); Lady Chatterley's Daughter (2011); Sexual Witchcraft (2011)	1990
James Deen	The Canyons (2013)	2013
Jamie Gillis	Nighthawks (1981); 52 Pick-Up (1986)	1981
Jamie Summers	Terror Night (1987)	1987
Janine Lindemulder	Lauderdale (1989); Private Parts (1997)	1989
Jeanna Fine	Orgazmo (1997); The Boondock Saints (1999)	1997
Jeannie Pepper	The Malibu Beach Vampires (1991); High School High (1996)	1991
Jenna Haze	Superbad (extra scene) (2007); Crank: High Voltage (2009)	2007
Jenna Jameson	Private Parts (1997); Dirt Merchant (1999); Porn 'n Chicken (2002); Evil Breed: The Legend of Samhain (2003); Zombie Strippers (2008)	1997
Jennifer Welles	Sugar Cookies (1973); The Groove Tube (1974)	1973
Jessie Andrews	Hot Summer Nights (2017)	2017
Jesse Jane	Baywatch: Hawaiian Wedding (2003); Frat Party (2009); Middle Men (2010); Let the Game Begin (2010); Highway To Havasu (2017)	2003
Jessica Jaymes	How to Make Love to a Woman (2010); Sunset Society (2018)	2010
Jewel De'Nyle	Pauly Shore Is Dead (2003)	2003
Jill Kelly	He Got Game (1998)	1998
Joanna Angel	Breath of Hate (2011)	2011
Johnny Hazzard	Tiger Orange (2014)	2014
Juli Ashton	Orgazmo (1997)	1997
Karen Lancaume	Baise-moi (2000)	2000
Katie Morgan	Zack and Miri Make a Porno (2008); L!fe Happens (2010)	2008
Katja Kassin	Tangerine (2015)	2015
Katsuni	Destricted (2006); Porn in the Hood (2012); Jailbreak (2017)	2006
Kayden Kross	Don Jon (2013); Blue Dream (2013); Samurai Cop 2: Deadly Vengeance (2015); The Hungover Games (2014); Highway to Havasu (2017); Verotika (2019)	2015
Kobe Tai	Very Bad Things (1998)	1998
Kylie Ireland	Strange Days (1995)	1995
Letha Weapons	Married... with Children - "The Naked And The Dead, But Mostly The Naked" (1995)	1995
Lexi Belle	Samurai Cop 2: Deadly Vengeance (2015)	2015
Lexington Steele	Crank: High Voltage (2009)	2009
Lizzy Borden	Terror Toons (2002)	2002
Linzi Drew	An American Werewolf in London (1981); Aria (1987)	1981
Lorelei Lee	About Cherry (2012)	2012
Manuel Ferrara	Starlet (2012)	2012
Maria Ozawa	Invitation Only (2009); Menculik Miyabi (2010)	2009
Maestro Claudio	The Chair Company (2025)	2025
Marie Forså	Immoral Tales (1973)	1973
Marilyn Chambers	The Owl and the Pussycat (1970) (Before porn); Rabid (1977)	1970
Marlene Willoughby	No Place to Hide (1970); I, the Jury (1982); Married to the Mob (1988)	1970
Mary Carey	Hot Times in the Hollywood Hills (2003); Pervert! (2005); Vice (2008) (uncredited); Wolf Mother (2016)	2005
Matthew Rush	Another Gay Movie (2006)	2006
Melissa Hill	Orgazmo (1997)	1997
Mia Hurley	Tangerine (2015)	2015
Michelle Thorne	Sacred Flesh (1999)	1994
Missy Martinez	Scouts Guide To The Zombie Apocalypse (2015)	2015
Moana Pozzi	Talcum Powder (1982); Escape from the Bronx (1983); Ginger and Fred (1986); L'Odissea (1991); Amami (1993)	1982
Monique Alexander	Crank: High Voltage (2009)	2002
Nacho Vidal	The Impatient Alchemist (2002); Va a ser que nadie es perfecto (2006)	2002
Nicole Aniston	Reboot Camp (2020)	2020
Nick Manning	Crank: High Voltage (2009); Cherry Bomb (2010)	2009
Nina Hartley	Boogie Nights (1997)	1997
Ovidie	The Pornographer (2001); All About Anna (2005)	2001
Paul Barresi	The Wild Party (1975); Perfect (1985); Ghosts of Mars (2001)	1975
Paul Thomas	Jesus Christ Superstar (1973) (as Philip Toubus) (before porn)	1973
Puma Swede	The 41-Year-Old Virgin Who Knocked Up Sarah Marshall and Felt Superbad About It (2010); I Hope They Serve Beer in Hell (2009); Sons of Anarchy (2014)	2010
Rebecca Lord	I Am a Sex Addict (2005)	2005
Riley Steele	Piranha 3D (2010)	2010
Robert Kerman	Cannibal Holocaust (1980); Eaten Alive! (1980); Cannibal Ferox (1981); Spider-Man (2002); Vic (2006)	1980
Rob Rotten	The Jackhammer Massacre (2004)	2004
Rocco Siffredi	Romance (1999); Anatomy of Hell (2004); Wedding in Paris (2011); Natale a cinque stelle (2018)	1999
Ron Jeremy	Ghostbusters (1984); 52 Pick-Up (1986); The Chase (1994); Killing Zoe (1994); Meet Wally Sparks (1997); Orgazmo (1997); 54 (1998); The Boondock Saints (1999); Terror Firmer (1999); Detroit Rock City (1999); Citizen Toxie: The Toxic Avenger IV (2000); Hell's Highway (2002); Porn 'n Chicken (2002); The Rules of Attraction (2002); Spun (2002); The Aristocrats (2005); Andre the Butcher (2005); Finishing the Game (2007); Homo Erectus (2007); One-Eyed Monster (2008); Crank: High Voltage (2009)	1984
Sasha Grey	Homo Erectus (2007); The Girlfriend Experience (2009); Smash Cut (2009); I Melt with You (2011); Would You Rather (2012); Open Windows (2014); The Scribbler (2014)	2007
Scott Lyons	Tangerine (2015)	2015
Savannah	The Invisible Maniac (1990) (as Shannon Wilsey); Sorority House Massacre II (1990) (as Shannon Wilsey); Camp Fear (1991) (as Shannon Wilsey)	1990
Selen	Zora la vampira (2000); Scarlet Diva (2000)	2000
Sensi Pearl	High School Musical (2006) (as Cassie Nelson); Read It and Weep (2006) (as Cassie Nelson); High School Musical 2 (2007) (as Cassie Nelson); About Cherry (2012)	2006
Serena	10 (1979); Hardcore (1979)	1979
Sharon Mitchell	Maniac (1980); Night of the Juggler (1980); 52 Pick-Up (1986)	1980
Shyla Stylez	Hollywood Sex Wars (2011)	2011
Sola Aoi	Memories of Matsuko (2006); Big Tits Zombie (2010)	2006
Stephen Geoffreys	Fraternity Vacation (1985) (Before porn); Fright Night (1985) (Before porn)	1985
Stormy Daniels	The 40-Year-Old Virgin (2005); Knocked Up (2007); D!rt (2007); Finding Bliss (2009); Party Down (2009); Wrong Side of Town (2010); Bad President (2020)	2005
Sunny Leone	The Girl Next Door (2004) (credited cameo); The Virginity Hit (2010); Jism 2 (2012); Shootout at Wadala (2013) (Guest Appearance); Jackpot (2013); Ragini MMS 2 (2014); Vadacurry (2014) (Guest Appearance); Hate Story 2 (2014) (Guest Appearance); Balwinder Singh Famous Ho Gaya (2014) (Guest Appearance); Mastizaade (2016); Current Theega (2015); Ek Paheli Leela (2015); Raees (2017) (Guest Appearance); Tera Intezaar (2017); PSV Garuda Vega (2017); Singh Is Bliing (2015)	2004
Sunrise Adams	Pizza: Special Deliveries - Episode: "Pizza World — Los Angeles" (2004)	2004
Tabatha Cash	Rai (1995)	1995
Tabitha Stevens	The Curse of El Charro (2005)	2005
Tawny Roberts	Shade (2003)	2003
Taylor Wane	Little Nicky (2000)	2000
Teri Weigel	Scarface (1983) (uncredited cameo); Cheerleader Camp (1988); Glitch! (1988); Return of the Killer Tomatoes (1988); Far from Home (1989); Night Visitor (1989); Savage Beach (1989); Marked for Death (1990); Predator 2 (1990); Innocent Blood (1992)	1983
Tom Byron	52 Pick-Up (1986)	1986
Tommy Pistol	Silent Night, Zombie Night (2009); Breath of Hate (2011)	2009
Traci Lords	Not of This Earth (1988); Cry-Baby (1990); Shock 'Em Dead (1991); Serial Mom (1993); Skinner (1993); The Tommyknockers (1993); Virtuosity (1995); Blade (1998); First Wave (2000–2001) (TV Series); Zack and Miri Make a Porno (2008); I Hope They Serve Beer in Hell (2009); Princess of Mars (2009)	1988
Tyra Misoux	Atomised (2006); Keinohrhasen (2007); 1½ Knights – In Search of the Ravishing Princess Herzelinde (2008)	2006
Veronica Hart	Ruby (1992); Alien Intruder (1993); Boogie Nights (1997); Magnolia (1999); One-Eyed Monster (2008)	1992
Yasmine Lafitte	A Lost Man (2007); The Last Deadly Mission (2008)	2007
Yasmin Lee	The Hangover Part II (2011)	2011
Yasmin Scott	Pizza: Back In Business - Episode 1 (2019)	2019
Zak Spears	The Doom Generation (1995)	1995
Zoe Voss	Starlet (2012)	2012

== See also ==
- List of mainstream actors who have appeared in pornographic films
