= 8th AVN Awards =

US adult industry award ceremony in 1991

- The 1991 AVN Awards Show Official Program
- Date: January 12, 1991
- Site: Tropicana Hotel & Casino, Paradise, Nevada
- Hosted by: Tom Byron

Highlights
- Best Picture: House of Dreams (Best Film)
- Most awards: House of Dreams (7)

The 8th AVN Awards ceremony, organized by Adult Video News (AVN) took place on January 12, 1991, at the Tropicana Hotel & Casino in Paradise, Nevada. During the ceremony, AVN Awards were presented in 60 categories honoring pornographic films released the previous year in the United States. The ceremony was videotaped for later pay-per-view broadcast. Actor Tom Byron hosted with seven co-hosts throughout the show.

House of Dreams won seven awards, the most of any feature, including Best Film. Other winners included Beauty and the Beast, Part 2 with five awards, while gay movie More Of A Man took four. Three movies took three awards: The Last X-Rated Movie, The Masseuse and Pretty Peaches 3, while Buttman’s Ultimate Workout and The Rise each won two trophies.

== Winners and nominees ==
The winners were announced during the awards ceremony on January 12, 1991. Besides being named Best Film, House of Dreams also won Best Director—Film for Andrew Blake and the Best Sex Scene in a Film Award.

=== Major awards ===
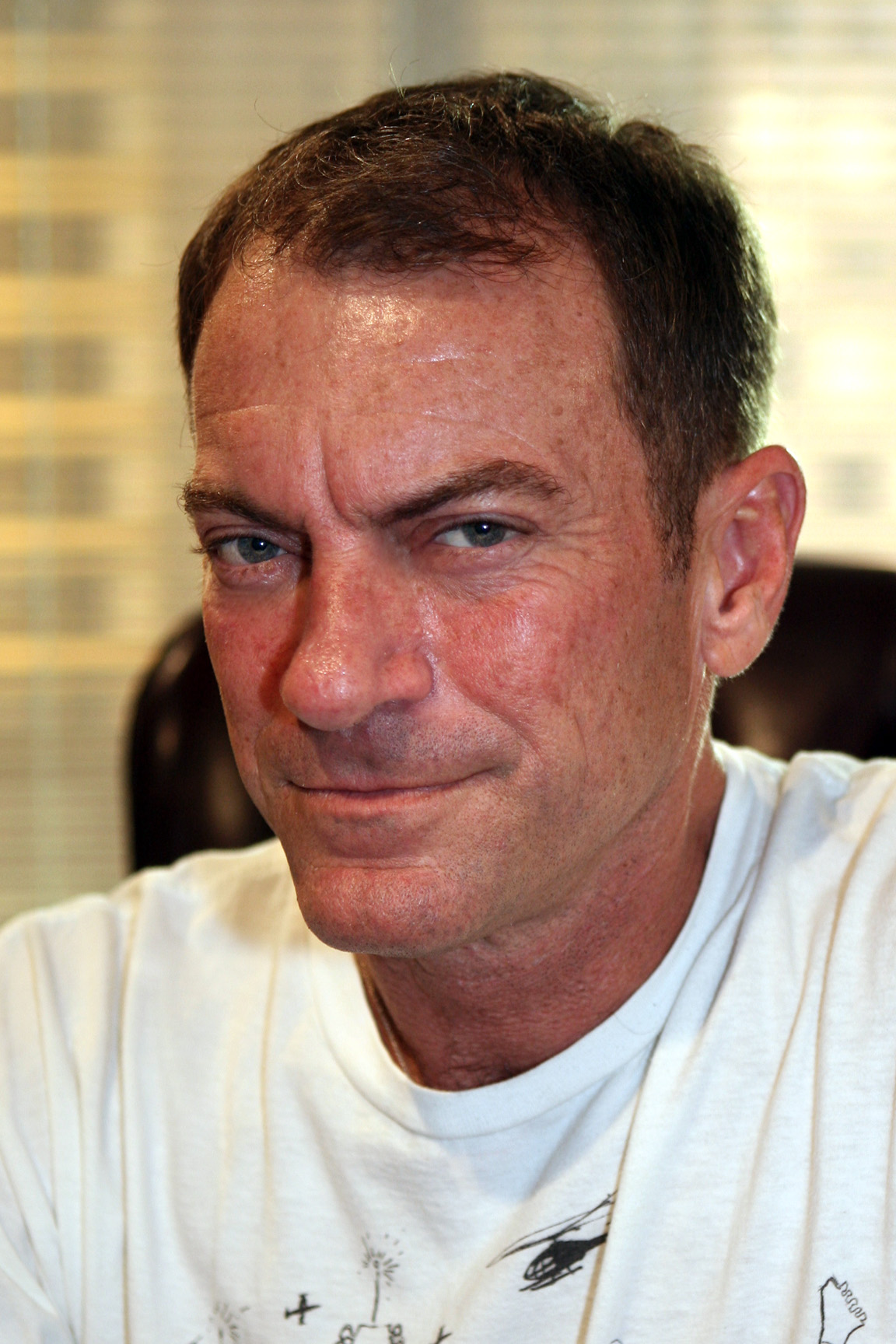
Randy Spears, Best Actor—Film winner

Winners are listed first, highlighted in boldface, and indicated with a double dagger (‡).

Best Film	Best Shot-on-Video Feature
**House of Dreams**‡; The Masseuse; A Night at the Waxworks; Night Trips II; A Portrait of Christy; Pretty Peaches 3; Radioactive; The Swap	**Beauty and the Beast, Part 2**‡; All That Sex; Fantasy Nights; Forbidden Games; The Last X-Rated Movie; Never Enough; The New Barbarians I & II; Out For Blood; Shadow Dancers I & II; Steal Breeze; Strange Curves; A Touch of Gold
Best Actor—Film	Best Actress—Film
**Randy Spears, The Masseuse**‡; Jerry Butler, The Swap; Rick Savage, A Portrait of Christy; Wayne Summers, Radioactive; Randy West, Torrid Without a Cause 2	**Hyapatia Lee, The Masseuse**‡; Tracey Adams, Pretty Peaches 3; Christy Canyon, A Portrait of Christy; Jennifer Stewart, The Swap; Tori Welles, Torrid Without A Cause 2
Best New Starlet	Best Actress—Video
**Jennifer Stewart**‡; Raquel Darrian; Sabrina Dawn; Ashlyn Gere; Madison; Sunny McKay; Danielle Rogers; Zara Whites	**Lauren Brice, Married Women**‡; Tracey Adams, Beauty and the Beast, Part 2; Jeanna Fine, Steal Breeze; Lauren Hall, The Tease; Angel Kelly, Little Miss Dangerous; Lynn LeMay, Midnight Fire; Victoria Paris, The New Barbarians; Tori Welles, Out For Blood
Best Supporting Actor—Film	Best Supporting Actress—Film
**Jon Martin, Pretty Peaches 3**‡; Buck Adams, Radioactive; Tom Byron, Torrid Without a Cause 2; Mike Horner, The Whore; Joey Silvera, The Whore	**Diedre Holland, Veil**‡; Tracey Adams, The Whore; Sharon Kane, The Swap; Keisha, Pretty Peaches 3; Madison, Torrid Without a Cause 2; Samantha Strong, Images of Desire; Viper, Midnight Fire
Best Supporting Actor—Video	Best Supporting Actress—Video
**Ron Jeremy, Playin’ Dirty**‡; Buck Adams, Confessions of a Chauffeur; Jerry Butler, Steal Breeze; Jamie Gillis, Paris By Night; Mike Horner, Sex Trek 1; Joey Silvera, Strange Curves; Randy West, New Barbarians II	**Nina Hartley, The Last X-Rated Movie**‡; Lauren Brice, Shadow Dancers I & II; Sabrina Dawn, Beauty and the Beast, Part 2; Patricia Kennedy, Steal Breeze; Sharon Mitchell, The Last X-Rated Movie; Samantha Strong, Fantasy Nights; Susan Vegas, All the Right Motions
Best Director—Film	Best Director—Shot-on-Video Feature
**Andrew Blake, House of Dreams**‡; Buck Adams, Radioactive; John T. Bone, Images of Desire; Alex de Renzy, Pretty Peaches 3; Paul Thomas, A Portrait of Christy	**Paul Thomas, Beauty and the Beast 2**‡; Greg Dark, Between the Cheeks 2; Rinse Dream, Night Dreams 2; Scotty Fox, All That Sex; Cecil Howard, The Last X-Rated Movie; John Leslie, Strange Curves; Fred J. Lincoln, Princess of the Night; Henri Pachard, Steal Breeze; Anthony Spinelli, Never Enough; John Stagliano, Shadow Dancers I & II
Best All-Sex Feature	Best All-Girl Video
**Buttman's Ultimate Workout**‡; Bend Over Babes; Buttman Goes to Rio; Sporting Illustrated; Total Reball; Unauthorized Biography of Rob Blow	**Ghost Lusters**‡; Anal Annie’s All-Girl Escort Service; Cat Lickers; Girls Gone Bad 2: The Breakout; Kittens; Rock Me; Wet ’n Working; Where The Boys Aren’t 3
Best Specialty Tape—Big Bust	Best Specialty Tape—Bondage
**Breast of Britain #8**‡; Breast of Britain #10; Breaststroke 3; Girls of Double D XII; Tit Tales	**House of Dark Dreams I & II**‡; The Challenge; Daddy Gets Punished; Face of Fear; Journey Into Submission; Nancy Crew Meets Dr. Friedenstein; Tantala’s Fat Rack; Warehouse Slaves Discipline
Best Selling Tape of 1990	Best Renting Tape of 1990
**House of Dreams**‡	**Pretty Peaches 3**‡
Best Sex Scene—Film	Best Video Sex Scene—Couple
**Sabre, Nikki Wilde, Sebastian; Beach sequence, House of Dreams**‡; Debi Diamond, Wayne Summers; The Book; Jeanna Fine, Zara Whites; House of Dreams; Christy Canyon, T. T. Boy, Peter North; A Portrait of Christy; Tracey Adams, Gene Carrera; Pretty Peaches 3; Peter North, Samantha Strong; Secrets; Ashlyn Gere, Rocco Siffredi; Secrets; Diedre Holland, Jon Dough; Veil	**Victoria Paris, Randy West; Beauty and the Beast 2**‡; Chantelle, John Stagliano; Bend Over Babes; Debi Diamond, T. T. Boy; Caught From Behind 13; Eric Edwards, Brandy Alexandre; Making Tracks; Joey Silvera, Sabrina Dawn; Never Enough; Tori Welles, Eric Price; Out For Blood; Victoria Paris, Jerry Butler; Sam’s Fantasy; Sabrina Dawn, Joey Silvera; Swedish Erotica Featurettes IV; Ashlyn Gere, Randy West; Total Reball; Sunny McKay, Randy West; A Touch of Gold
Best Video Group Sex Scene	Best All-Girl Video Sex Scene
**Sunny McKay, Alexandria Quinn, Rocco Siffredi; Buttman's Ultimate Workout**‡; Sabrina Dawn, Rachel Ryan, Randy Spears; Beauty and the Beast, Part 2; Debi Diamond, Blake Palmer, James Lewis, Tom Byron, T. T. Boy; Between the Cheeks 2; Ashlyn Gere, Selena Steele, Tom Byron; The Last Resort; Debi Diamond, Buck Adams, Sean Michaels, T. T. Boy, 2 more guys; Nasty Girls; Casey Williams, Ashley Dunne, Randy West, Joey Silvera; Sexual Intent; Bridgette Monroe, Randy West, Sabrina Dawn; Trick Tracey	**Victoria Paris, Sabrina Dawn; The New Barbarians**‡; Victoria Paris, Sabrina Dawn; Beauty and the Beast, Part 2; Tianna, Lois Ayres; Between the Cheeks 2; Madison, Angela Summers; Cat Lickers; Tianna, Bionca, Victoria Paris; Ghost Lusters; Alice Springs, Barbara Dare; L. A. Stories; Cassandra Dark, Alexandria Quinn; Rock Me; Niki Wilde, Celia Young, Champagne; Wet ’n Working

=== Additional award winners ===
These awards were also presented at the awards show:

- Best Actor—Gay Video: Joey Stefano, More Of A Man
- Best Actor—Video Feature: Eric Edwards, The Last X-Rated Movie
- Best Amateur Tape: Fantasy Realm
- Best Anal-Themed Feature: Between The Cheeks 2
- Best Art Direction: House of Dreams
- Best Bisexual Video: The Last Good Bi
- Best Box Cover Concept: Fatliners, Executive Video
- Best Box Cover Concept, Gay Video: Black in Black, Associated Video Group
- Best Cinematography: House of Dreams
- Best Compilation Tape: Only the Best 3—Then 'Til Now
- Best Director—Bisexual Video: Paul Norman, Bi and Beyond IV ^{1}
- Best Director—Gay Video: Taylor Hudson, The Rise
- Best Editing For A Film: House of Dreams
- Best Editing For A Video Feature: Beauty and the Beast, Part 2
- Best Editing, Gay Video: Michael Zen, He-Devils
- Best Featurette Tape: Beat the Heat
- Best Gay Solo Tape: Straight to Bed
- Best Gay Video Feature: More Of A Man
- Best Music: Shadow Dancers I & II
- Best Newcomer, Gay Video: Jason Ross
- Best Non-Sexual Performance: Jose Duval, Oh What A Night
- Best Non-Sexual Performance, Gay Video: Chi Chi LaRue, More Of A Man
- Best Original Music, Gay Video: Myriam Zadeck, Full Exposure
- Best Overall Marketing Campaign: Vegas series, CDI Home Video
- Best Packaging—Feature Film: Pretty Peaches 3, VCA Pictures
- Best Packaging, Gay Video: Desert Fox, Vivid Man
- Best Packaging—Video Feature: Diedre in Danger, Vivid Video
- Best Pro Amateur Tape: More Dirty Debutantes 3
- Best Screenplay—Film: Mark Haggard, The Masseuse
- Best Screenplay, Gay Video: Jerry Douglas, More Of A Man
- Best Screenplay—Video: Anne Randall, The Last X-Rated Movie
- Best Sex Scene, Gay Video: Ryan Yeager, Scott Bond; The Rise
- Best Softcore Release: Sea of Dreams
- Best Specialty Tape—Other Genres: Life in the Fat Lane
- Best Supporting Actor, Gay Video: Ryan Yeager, Stranded
- Best Tease Performance: Chantelle, Bend Over Babes
- Best Videography: Beauty and the Beast, Part 2
- Best Videography, Gay Video: John Trennell, Idol Eyes

=== Honorary AVN Awards ===
==== Special Achievement Award ====
- General Video of America
- Philip Harvey and Adam & Eve
- First Amendment Lawyers Association
- Deep Throat—20th Anniversary

==== Hall of Fame ====
AVN Hall of Fame inductees for 1991 were: Barbara Dare, Christy Canyon, Randy West, Tom Byron, Hyapatia Lee, Shanna McCullough, Sharon Kane, Eric Edwards, Jim and Artie Mitchell

=== Multiple nominations and awards ===
The following eight movies received multiple awards:

- 7 - House of Dreams
- 5 - Beauty and the Beast, Part 2
- 4 - More Of A Man
- 3 - The Last X-Rated Movie, The Masseuse, Pretty Peaches 3
- 2 - Buttman’s Ultimate Workout, The Rise

== Presenters and performers ==
The following individuals, in order of appearance, presented awards or performed music or comedy. The show's trophy girl was Alexandria Quinn.

=== Presenters ===
Presenters

Name(s)	Role
Randy West and two actresses	Presenters of the award for Best All-Girl Video
Niki Wilde; Wayne Summers; Cheri Taylor	Presenters of the awards for Best Supporting Actress—Film and Best Supporting Actor—Film
Rocco Siffredi and two actresses	Presenters of the awards for Best Supporting Actress—Video Feature and Best Supporting Actor—Video Feature
E. Z. Ryder; Holly Ryder	Presenters of the award for Best All-Sex Tape
Paul Fishbein	Presenter of the awards for Best Renting Tape of 1990 and Best Selling Tape of 1990
Nina Hartley; Gloria Leonard	Presenters of the AVN Hall of Fame honors
Tori Welles; Victoria Paris	Presenters of the award for Best New Starlet
Christy Canyon; Jose Duval	Presenters of the award for Best Director—Film
Randy Spears; Danielle Rogers	Presenters of the award for Best Director—Shot-on-Video Feature
Rick Savage; Britt Morgan	Presenters of the awards for Best Specialty Tape—Bondage, Best Specialty Tape—Big Bust, Best Sex Scene—Film, Best All-Girl Video Sex Scene and Best Group Sex Scene—Video
Ron Jeremy; Madison	Presenters of the award for Best Video Sex Scene—Couple
Jennifer Stewart	Presenter of the award for Best Actress—Video Feature
Sean Michaels; Zara Whites	Presenters of the award for Best Film
Hyapatia Lee; Missy	Presenters of the award for Best Shot-on-Video Feature

=== Performers ===
Performers

Name(s)	Role	Performed
Moonlight Entertainers	Performers	Musical numbers
Tom Byron	Performer	Opening number: “I Just Wanna Make Love To You”
Bobby Slayton	Performer	Standup comedy
Chi Chi LaRue	Performer	Musical number: “Me So Horny”

== Ceremony information ==
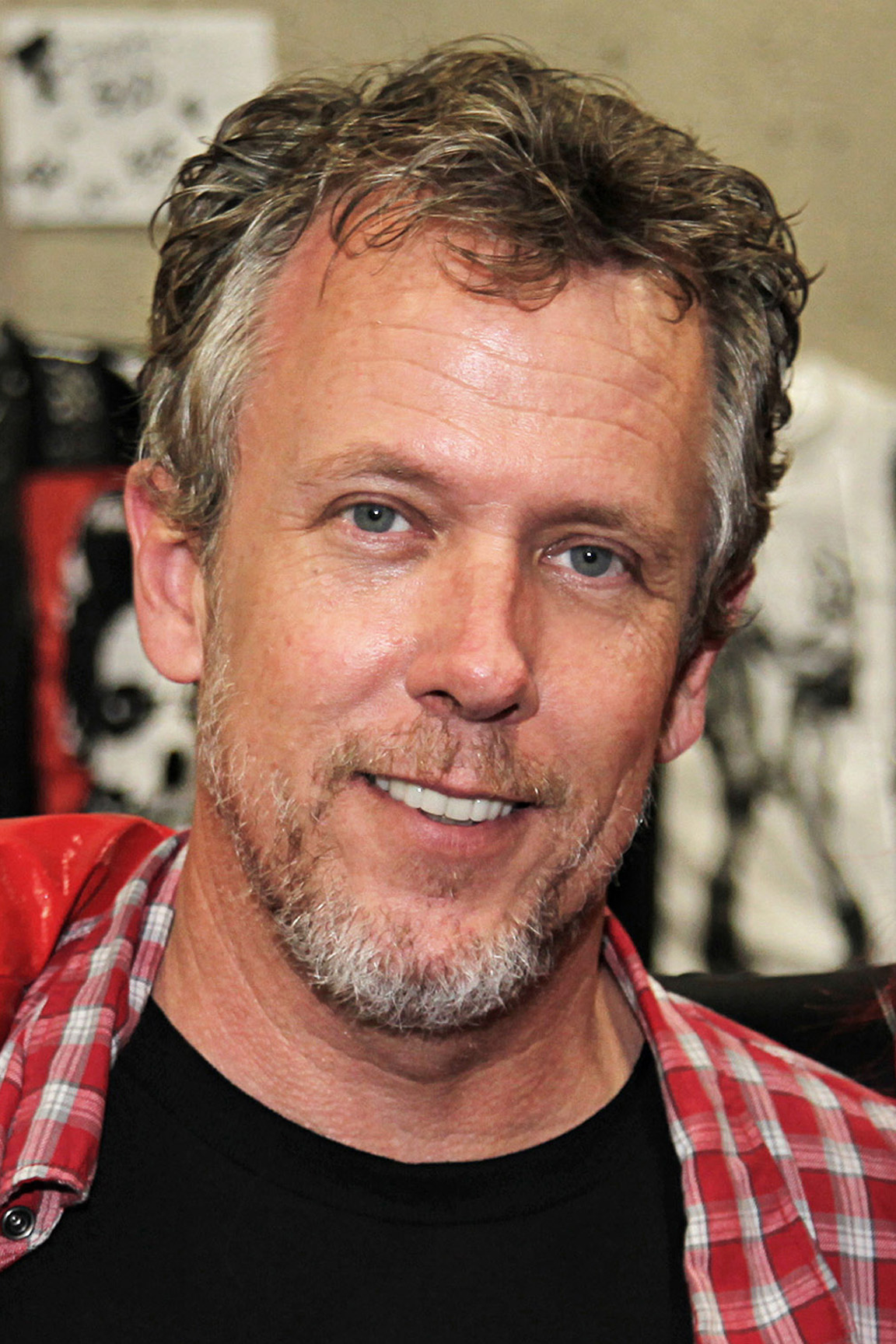
Tom Byron hosted the 11th AVN Awards

Actor Tom Byron hosted the show for the first time. He had several co-hosts: Jeanna Fine in Part 1, Nina Hartley and Gloria Leonard for the Hall of Fame entrants portion, Ashlyn Gere and Chi Chi LaRue for the next portion and Britt Morgan and Rick Savage for the final awards.

The show was videotaped for later pay-per-view broadcast and a VHS video release by VCA Pictures.

House of Dreams was announced as the Best Selling Tape of 1990 while Pretty Peaches 3 was announced as the Best Renting Tape of 1990.

=== Critical reviews ===
Inside X-Rated Video called the awards show “marvelous” and more tranquil than the Consumer Electronics Show, which many adult entertainment companies had booths at.

== See also ==
- AVN Award for Best Actress
- AVN Award for Best Supporting Actress
- AVN Award for Male Performer of the Year
- AVN Award for Male Foreign Performer of the Year
- AVN Award for Female Foreign Performer of the Year
- AVN Female Performer of the Year Award
- List of members of the AVN Hall of Fame

== Notes ==
^1 The AVN Awards Show Official Program says Bi and Beyond V was the nominee in the Best Director—Bisexual Video category. However, AVN magazine, in listing the show's award winners, had Bi and Beyond IV as the winner. There is no record of which is the typographical error. Both movies were released in 1990, so either could be correct.
