= List of mainstream actors who have appeared in pornographic films =

This is a list of mainstream actors/actresses who have appeared in pornographic films that includes performers who appeared in adult films early, later on, or throughout their careers, but all are known primarily for their mainstream acting. This is a list of documented appearances by mainstream actors in soft core and hard core pornographic films (movies) over the course of their careers.

== Appearances in non-sexual roles ==
- John Gielgud, Malcolm McDowell, Helen Mirren and Peter O'Toole appeared in the movie Caligula, a film where producer Bob Guccione would eventually film and add explicit unsimulated sex scenes after the original filming had been completed; McDowell later expressed his outrage over this. Gielgud also wrote a screenplay for a pornographic film.
- Aldo Ray appeared in a single, non-sexual role, in the 1979 film Sweet Savage along with Carol Connors, of Deep Throat fame.
- Cameron Mitchell appeared in the 1983 film Dixie Ray, Hollywood Star as the Lieutenant, often in scenes with star John Leslie.
- Hal Smith and Frank Welker in the 1976 animated movie Once Upon a Girl. Smith appeared in live action sequences dressed in drag as Mother Goose as well as providing additional voices in the animated sequences and Welker provided the voice of Jack and other voices. Because both actors were still involved in mainstream movies, television and voice over work and due to the nature of the content of the film they were credited under a pseudonym, Smith as Mother Goose and Welker as Jack Beanstalk.
- Kimbo Slice made a cameo appearance in a video for Street Blowjobs, a site owned by Reality Kings, featuring a blonde woman named Melanie.
- Bella Thorne directed the pornographic short film Her & Him for Pornhub in 2019.
- Reggie Nalder was credited as "Detlef Van Berg" in the X rated films Dracula Sucks (1978) and Blue Ice (1985), but performed in no scenes of a pornographic nature.
- Richard Belzer, a noted comedian at the time who later became known for his role as John Munch in Homicide: Life on the Street and Law & Order: Special Victims Unit, appears as an audience member in Café Flesh (1982), but does not appear in any of the sexual scenes.

== Appearances in sexual roles ==
- Lilli Carati, a star of Italian genre cinema, starred on several pornographic films in the late 1980s.
- Milly D'Abbraccio appeared in several Italian genre films, sometimes in main roles, before switching to porn in the late 1980s.
- Kristine DeBell – American actress and model known most prominently from her role in the 1979 film Meatballs and 1980 film The Big Brawl also starred in the title role of the 1976 pornographic film Alice in Wonderland.
- Markéta DeFor - Czech actress who appeared in a 2017 episode of Czech Casting as "Marketa 3569".
- Dustin Diamond – In 2006, Diamond directed and released his own sex tape, Screeched – Saved by the Smell.
- Jaimee Foxworth – Child star Foxworth, at age nineteen, switched to starring in pornographic films, usually credited as "Crave". Her transition to the pornographic industry was covered by The Oprah Winfrey Show in a dedicated show entitled "Former Child TV Star Reveals the Biggest Mistake of Her Life".
- Stephen Geoffreys – During the 1990s, Geoffreys appeared for several years in gay pornographic movies, using the alias "Sam Ritter".
- Spalding Gray appeared in three adult films in the 1970s including Farmer's Daughters.
- Sibel Kekilli – The German actress known for her role in Game of Thrones acted in pornographic films using the stage name "Dilara".
- Kelli McCarty – The soap opera star appeared in a single adult film, Faithless, after contacting Vivid Entertainment to explore the idea.
- Angelique Pettyjohn – Pettyjohn was an American actress and burlesque queen. She appeared as the drill thrall Shahna in the Star Trek episode, "The Gamesters of Triskelion", and in two episodes of Get Smart as male CONTROL agent "Charlie Watkins" very convincingly disguised as a woman. During the early 1980s, she performed in the hardcore adult films Titillation (1982), Stalag 69 (1982), and Body Talk (1982). She later appeared in such cult classic features as The Lost Empire (1984) and Repo Man (1984)
- Kira Reed – Originally had a website that featured her husband and herself engaging in explicit sexual acts. She later went on to appear in a movie called Basically Becca produced in 2001 by Wicked Pictures.
- Simon Rex – The MTV personality in 1993, at age 19, he appeared solo in scenes for two masturbation porn films, Young, Hard & Solo II; Young, Hard & Solo III. In 1998, at 24, he appeared in Hot Sessions III. Archived footage was used in two movies in 2000: Hot Sessions 11 and Hot Sessions 12.
- Holly Sampson – As a teenager she had mainstream acting roles appearing as Fred Savage's love interest in the Wonder Years episode "The Summer Song" (1989), as well as the film Pump Up the Volume. She starred in Other Men's Wives (1996) and had a minor role in the 1998 Angelina Jolie movie Gia. Sampson began her career in the porn industry by doing several hardcore films in 1998 under the single-name aliases "Nicolette" and "Zoe," but quickly left this side of the industry to perform in softcore films. In 2008, Sampson returned to the hardcore non-fetish side of adult film, under the name Holly Sampson.
- Tom Sizemore – "The Tom Sizemore Sex Scandal" is a DVD video featuring actor Tom Sizemore having sex with multiple women, released by Vivid Entertainment, on 19 October 2005. Reports claim the sex video was orchestrated by Falcon Foto, a pornographic media business, all on the hush-hush, then "discovered" as some celebrity sex tape.
- Ilona Staller – She had an established mainstream career in Italian 1970s genre cinema before starring in a number of pornographic films with the stage name "Cicciolina" starting from 1983.
- Sylvester Stallone – Stallone had his first starring role in the softcore pornography feature film The Party at Kitty and Stud's (1970). He was paid $200 for two days' work. The production company later changed the title of the movie to The Italian Stallion in order to capitalize on Stallone's success in his break out role in Rocky.
- Karrine Steffans – In 2006, video vixen and author Karrine Steffans appeared in an adult film released by Vivid Entertainment.
- Scott Schwartz – In the 1990s, Schwartz worked in the adult film industry in minor, non-sexual roles, and behind the scenes in numerous administrative roles. He eventually starred in several sexual roles. After appearing in more than a dozen films in a non-sexual capacity he quit in 2000. Schwartz is best known for his role in A Christmas Story as the character Flick, who gets his tongue stuck to a frozen flag pole.
- Philip Toubus started his career in musical plays like Hair and Jesus Christ Superstar. The latter landed him the role as Peter in the movie with the same name, by Norman Jewison. This led to some minor TV roles and by 1974 he had changed his name to Paul Thomas and transitioned into pornographic movies.
- Kelly Jean Van Dyke – Was a child actress known for her appearances on the television series My Mother the Car and Accidental Family in the 1960s. Also known as Nancee Kelly, she was the daughter of actor Jerry Van Dyke and the niece of Dick Van Dyke. She appeared in over twenty-five adult films before her death in 1991.
- Maitland Ward, an actress who played Rachel McGuire on the sitcom Boy Meets World and Jessica Forrester on the soap opera The Bold and the Beautiful, has begun appearing in adult films since 2019.

== See also ==
- List of pornographic actors who appeared in mainstream films
- Celebrity sex tape
- Muteki, Japanese company that recruits mainstream Japanese actresses and entertainers into the adult video business
