= Cherry bomb (disambiguation) =

A cherry bomb is a spherical firework.

Cherry bomb may also refer to:

== Film ==
- Cherry Bomb (film), a 2011 American action film
- Cherrybomb (film), a 2009 British drama

== Music ==
- Cherry Bomb (album), 2015, by American rapper Tyler, the Creator
- Cherry Bomb (EP), 2017, by NCT 127
  - "Cherry Bomb" (NCT 127 song)
- "Cherry Bomb" (John Mellencamp song), 1987
- "Cherry Bomb" (The Runaways song), 1976
- "Cherry Bomb" (Kylie Minogue song), 2007
- Cherry Bomb, solo project of Mandy Lee

== Other ==
- Cherry Bomb (muffler), a brand of automotive exhaust systems
- Cherry Bomb (wrestler), Canadian professional wrestler Laura Dennis (born 1987)
- Cherry Bomb (comics), a fictional DC Comics character

== See also ==
- Cherri Bomb, a character in the animated TV series Hazbin Hotel
- Cherri Bomb, original name of the early 2000s L.A. rock band Hey Violet
- Cherry Bombz, a 1980s British/Finnish rock band with Andy McCoy
- Cherry Bombe, a US-American wine magazine
