= Porn star (disambiguation) =

A porn star is a male or female actor in pornographic films.

Porn Star, Porn star or Pornstar may also refer to:

- "Pornstar", a song by Amy Meredith, from the album Restless
- "Porn Star", a song by Faster Pussycat, from the album The Power and the Glory Hole
- "Porn Star", a song by Maty Noyes, from the EP Love Songs From a Lolita
- Porn Stars (album), an album by Pretty Boy Floyd
- Porn Star: The Legend of Ron Jeremy, a 2001 documentary about porn legend Ron Jeremy
- Pornstar, a 1999 photo book by Ian Glitter
- Pornostar (film), a Japanese film
- Porn star martini, a vodka cocktail

== See also ==
- "Porn Star Dancing", debut single by the Canadian rock band My Darkest Days
- Porn Star Diaries, a documentary made by Sex Station's producer in 2006, featuring interviews about porn careers and industry
- Pawn Stars, an American reality show about a pawn shop
