= Camp Fear =

Camp Fear may refer to:

- "Camp Fear" (Ben 10 episode), a season 2 episode of Ben 10
- "Camp Fear" (CSI episode), the 11th episode of the first season of CSI: Miami
- Camp Fear (Daria episode), the fourth episode of the fifth season of Daria
- Camp Fear (film), a 1991 horror film
