= Stephanie Blake =

American burlesque performer and actress

- Born: August 21, 1954 (age 71); Wichita Falls, Texas, U.S.
- Occupations: Film, television actress

Stephanie Blake (born August 21, 1954), also known as Cimarron, is an American burlesque performer and actress. She is known for playing the role of the nurse who came to Ferris' house in Ferris Bueller's Day Off (1986).

== Life and career ==
Blake was born in Texas and grew up in Kansas City, Missouri. She started performing burlesque at nightclubs with the help of her mother, who was also an exotic dancer. Blake then moved to Las Vegas where she continued performing while also taking acting lessons, before moving to Los Angeles to further pursue her acting career. She credits her ability to land television acting work to her experience as an exotic performer. Blake ran the club The Star Strip in west Hollywood, during the 1980s. She was crowned Miss Exotic World in 1997 and 1998.

Blake had a memorable role as the Singing Nurse in Ferris Bueller's Day Off. She has also appeared in films such as The Sure Thing, The Mambo Kings, The Invisible Maniac, Lost in the Pershing Point Hotel, and Cake: A Wedding Story.
