= Tehran Tokyo =

Persian song by Sasy

Single by Sasy
- Language: Persian
- Released: 4 March 2021
- Length: 3:23
- Label: Radio Javan
- Producer: Manouchehri Brothers

Sasy singles chronology
"Doctor" (2020)	"Tehran Tokyo" (2021)

Music video
- "Tehran Tokyo" on YouTube

"Tehran, Tokyo" (Persian: تهران توکیو) is a song by Iranian singer Sasy. It was written and composed by Sasy and produced by the Manouchehri Brothers. The song was released on 4 March 2021 by Radio Javan. An accompanying music video premiered on 10 March 2021.

The music video features actresses, including the American pornstar Alexis Texas, gyrating atop cars and inside bars. This clip received about 18 million views within one week.

The Iranian judicial system described the song as "ridiculous" and "norm-breaking" and announced that it would arrest its producers. The music video has also been criticized by Iranians for exposing Sasy's fans to porn.

== Controversies ==
Since its publication and the visit of about 10 million people, the song has caused controversy that even reached the headlines of a newspaper in Iran.

=== Life and a Day movie dialogue ===
The song uses the voice of Iranian actor Navid Mohammadzadeh in the movie Life and a Day. His dialogue in the song is sampled from a famous sequence of the film addressed to his sister Somayeh.

=== Presence of Alexis Texas ===
Another controversy of the song's music video is the presence of American pornstar Alexis Texas with a scarf and a manteau and dancing in Iran, which has created controversy due to his fame in Iran.

=== Play on the police car ===
For the first teaser of the music video release, Sasy posted a short video on his Instagram page, which showed his music being played from a police car in Iran. The music was quickly removed from his page, but the Iranian Rahvar police denied this and announced that the FATA police were following up with the makers of the video.
