= Staying on Top =

- Written by: Kristi Russell
- Directed by: John Quinn
- Starring: Holly Sampson; Angela Nicholas; Danny Pape; Sasha Peralto; Stephen Argyle; Ron Steinberg; Mia Zottoli; Keith Wellington; Leila Hashemzadeh; Holly Hollywood; Nick Pellegrino; Chera Leigh; Tracy Ryan; Roxanne Galla; Amy Miller
- Theme music composer: John Boegehold
- Country of origin: United States
- Original language: English

Production
- Producer: Jennifer M. Byrne
- Cinematography: Andrea V. Rossotto
- Running time: 87 minutes

Original release
- Release: 2002

Staying on Top is a 2002 American made for cable erotic film directed by John Quinn.

== Plot ==
Advertising executive, Katherine Phillips (Holly Sampson), seeks to get her account back when she is sidelined by her supervisor Cindy La Conte (Angela Nicolas).

== Synopsis ==
A new, young advertising executive, Katherine Phillips, is fresh out of grad school with some cutting edge ideas. She is courted by all the marketing firms but joins CBB. Her name alone attracts Lip Ink Cosmetics to have them do their next big line and Katherine is soon put in charge of a new account. Except her supervisor Cindy La Conte won't give up power and control easily. So when she unfairly sidelines Katherine and takes over, Cindy thinks she's won the battle. That is until an upset Katherine quits her job from the frustrations, discovers some deeply hidden truths and decides to go after the contract for her own newly formed company. This is much to the chagrin of Cindy, who needs Katherine's creativity if she's to have any hope of keeping her job. Katherine does everything she can do to stay on top of her business, even if she has to use seductive means to do so. But Cindy also uses sex to climb the corporate ladder and beat her rival. Cindy wants the account all to herself. However, the new accountant specifically wanted Katherine to do the work, not Cindy. If the head of the firm finds out that Katherine has quit her job, Cindy will be out of hers. If things weren't bad enough for Katherine, she finds out that her boyfriend, Jake, has been cheating on her. Now Katherine must survive Cindy's schemes while dealing with the emotional turmoil of her love life and succeed with her dreams. To try and stay one step ahead of Katherine, Cindy uses any means at her disposal, including coercing her own assistant Tai (Sasha Peralto) into spying on Katherine. However Tai is also friends with Katherine. But her career is at risk if she doesn't do what her boss tells her to, which may very well be the wildcard that determines who lands the account. Pretty soon, Kathrine and her best friend, Melissa Bessler get together and set up a plan to start their own agency. To help them with this, they bring in Tai on board with the idea as well. In order to land themselves the account, the three of them enlist Heather, a masseuse, for their first photo shootings. In the end they get Cindy fired by substituting her disk of photo shootings for their one involving shots of illicit sexual material of Cindy and Jake.

== Background ==
The film was produced by the production company Indigo Entertainment. It was broadcast several times in summer 2002 at fixed times and on demand on the premium channels Cinemax and Showtime.

== Reception ==
Dr. Gore's Movie Reviews gave the film 2 out of 4.
