= Pornstar (book) =

1999 book by Ian Gittler

- Author: Ian Gittler
- Language: English
- Subject: Pornography, porn stars
- Genre: Photo book, coffee table book
- Publisher: Simon & Schuster
- Publication date: October 18, 1999
- Publication place: United States
- Media type: Print, hardback
- Pages: 176 pages

Pornstar is a 1999 American photo and coffee table book written and photographed by Ian Gittler.

== Overview ==
Photos and interviews with the stars of the world of porn including Savannah, Jamie Summers, John Stagliano, Ron Jeremy, Sharon Mitchell, Debi Diamond, Tom Byron and April Rayne.

== Origins and creation ==
Devised nine years before its eventual publication, photographer Ian Gittler sought to create a coffee table photo book of porn stars. Gittler travelled to Los Angeles and dove deep into the multi-billion dollar X rated adult entertainment industry where he went from voyeur, to photographing, interviewing and ultimately sleeping with porn stars, being on set at pornographic film shoots, attending adult video conventions and strip clubs, and starring as a porn film extra.

During the creation of the book Gittler had photographed and spent the night with porn star Savannah, her photo ending up on the front cover of Pornstar. While in New York taking a break from the making of the book and getting therapy, Gittler was notified Savannah had committed suicide.

Gittler returned to Los Angeles to finish the book and Pornstar was finally published in 1999 when Gittler was 37 years old.

Gittler found that every female star he talked to spoke of leaving porn and doing "real movies." Consequently, while making the book Gittler came across an article in Interview magazine called "An Actress Who Likes Taking Chances" about one of Gittler's interview subjects, adult actress April Rayne. Interview's film critic praised Rayne's performance in the non-porn independent film Hold Me, Thrill Me, Kiss Me that she acted in under her real name. Gittler wrote in Pornstar that Rayne's mainstream success was a vindication of his original vision of the book.

A close friend of Ian Gittler's, American Psycho author Bret Easton Ellis, assisted him with the book's final draft.

== Critical reception ==
UK newspaper The Independent wrote, "As Gittler got increasingly involved in porn, his notion of a glamorous, sexually adventurous world began to turn sour. Most of the actors and actresses he met were addicted to drink or drugs, and hinted at revulsion over selling their bodies."

Variety described Pornstar as a, "creepy 1999 collection of stark photographs and even starker essays."

Publishers Weekly wrote, "Though this book purports to be a journalistic portrait of the porn demimonde, there is little rigor or emotional depth to it. Gittler in the end comes off as being both leering and judgmental, blurring the line he attempts to draw between pornography and journalism about pornography."
