= Jamie Summers =

American pornographic film actress

Jamie Summers is an American pornographic film actress. She had an exclusive contract with the company Vivid Entertainment.

== Personal and professional life ==
In 1986, upon completion of working with adult film star Ginger Lynn, Vivid Entertainment created The Brat pornographic video series to star Summers in the lead.

Summers was interviewed and photographed for the 1999 Ian Glitter photo book Pornstar. In Pornstar, Summers tells of how in addition to performing in adult films she toured as an exotic dancer and of her desire to act in "real movies."

Glitter also writes in Pornstar of Summers introducing him to her roommate Steven, a gay 21 year old film student friend that Summers was supporting financially and, in addition to living in her Hollywood apartment at the time in the 1990s, also acted as Summers' roadie and assistant when doing exotic dance tours.

Summers at one time dated Vivid Entertainment owner Steven Hirsch.

== Selected filmography ==
- The Brat (1986)
- Army Brat (1987)
- Born for Love (1987)
- Little Shop of Whores (1987)
- Jamie Loves Jeff (1988)
- Night Trips (1989)
- Jamie Loves Jeff 2 (1991)
- Blue Jean Brat (1991)
- The Bad News Brat (1991)
- Night Rhythms (1992) (as Jamie Stafford)

== See also ==
- List of pornographic film actors who appeared in mainstream films
