= Sasy =

Iranian rapper (born 1988)

Sasy ساسی
- Also known as: Sasy Mankan
- Born: Sasan Heydari Yafteh; 11 November 1988 (age 37)
- Origin: Ahvaz, Iran
- Genres: Pop; hip-hop; rap
- Occupation: Rapper
- Instrument: Vocals
- Years active: 2006–present

Sasan Heydari Yafteh (Persian: ساسان حیدری یافته; born 11 November 1988), better known by his stage name Sasy (Persian: ساسی), formerly known as Sasy Mankan (Persian: ساسی مانکن), is an Iranian rapper from Ahvaz. Reuters has described him as one of Iran's most famous underground singers. Sasy's hit song "Gentleman" has over 100 million plays on the Persian music station Radio Javan.

== Career and controversies ==
His work is usually described as "danceable" and "energetic". As of 2023, several of his songs have become popular on TikTok for twerk challenges.

=== Meeting Mehdi Karroubi ===
Before the 2009 Iranian presidential election, Sasy met with the candidate Mehdi Karroubi. Due to his activity without permission, Sasy was noticed and caused controversies with some media (especially some websites against Karroubi). Some websites wrote articles in Karroubi's critique under the heading "Aftershocks of meeting Sasy". In response to these controversies, Ahmad Zeidabadi stated that the reason for his vote for Karroubi was to meet with Sasy. Some sources also reported that Sasy performed live for Karroubi.

=== Arrests ===
Sasy was arrested on April 27, 2010, while attending several house parties in Kish. Some sources attributed his arrest to his support for Mehdi Karroubi in the presidential election, and some to "dance in the Kish Bazaar". In response, Gouya News published a satirical article entitled "Sasy Mankan behind Evin Showcase".

One week after Sasy's arrest, the deputy police chief, Ahmadreza Radan, said of Sasy's arrest: "The police will include someone like this who is looking for so-called anomalies." However, in an interview with Rapfa, Sasy described his arrest as mere rumor.

=== Collaboration with Alexis Texas ===
In March 2021, the release of the music video for the song "Tehran Tokyo", starring pornstar Alexis Texas, was met with criticism.

Mohammad Sarshar, the administrator of Children channel of Islamic Republic of Iran broadcasting, called for an international prosecution and the arrest of Sasy Mankan, according to the Convention on the Rights of the Child. Iranian media have previously criticized him for using sexually explicit language in his songs. Iranian singer Amir Tataloo found this "interesting and funny".

== Discography ==
=== Albums and EPs ===
- Love? No Tnx (EP) (2014)
- Bad Salighe (2016)
- Iranizeh (2018)

=== Singles ===
- Samet Diss Track (with Mokhte, Yelly and Pishtaz) (c. 2006-2007)
- Rap Bandari (2008)
- Parmida (with Alishmas & Hossein Mokhte (Mokhtari)) (2008)
- Tehrano LA Kon (2010)
- IQ 2 ICU (2010)
- Khat Roo Khat (2012)
- Vay Cheghad Mastam Man (2013)
- Vaghti Ba Hamdigeim (2014)
- Halesh Khoobe (2015)
- Eshtebah (2015)
- Masnuee (with Kourosh Moghimi) (2016)
- Saaghiya (2016)
- Yekam Yekam (with Sahar) (2016)
- Salam (2016)
- Noosh (2017)
- Ostad (2017)
- Hame Bada (2017)
- Che Ajab (2018)
- Che Pesari (2018)
- Hali Hali (2018)
- Gentleman (2019)
- Doctor (2020)
- Tehran Tokyo (with Alexis Texas's presence) (2021)
- Maman Mano Bebakhsh (2022)
- Baradarane Leila (2023)
- Hulu (with Arash) (2024)
- Marmoolak (2025)
