= Bikini Frankenstein =

2010 television film directed by Fred Olen Ray

- Based on: Frankenstein by Mary Shelley
- Written by: Fred Olen Ray
- Directed by: Fred Olen Ray
- Starring: Frankie Cullen; Jayden Cole; Brandin Rackley; Christine Nguyen; Billy Chappell; Ted Newsom; Ron Ford; Thea Samper; Alexis Texas
- Theme music composer: Anthony Francis
- Country of origin: United States
- Original language: English

Production
- Producer: Dan Golden
- Running time: 81 minutes
- Production company: Retromedia Entertainment

Original release
- Network: Cinemax
- Release: January 18, 2010

Bikini Frankenstein is a 2010 American made for cable erotic film directed by Fred Olen Ray (under the pseudonym name Nicholas Juan Medina). It is based on the novel Frankenstein by Mary Shelley. Bikini Frankenstein depicts Dr. Frankenstein (Frankie Cullen) losing his job after having sex with his science student Debbie Sloane (Alexis Texas). He travels back to his native Transylvania where he successfully revives the body of Eve (Jayden Cole), using electricity. After showing off his successful experiment to colleagues in America, Eve later explodes; leading Dr. Frankenstein to proclaim he will work further on his experiments.

The film was both written and directed by Ray, and produced by Retromedia Entertainment. It was shown on Cinemax before being distributed DVD format. The New Annotated Frankenstein called it "soft porn", and Postnaturalism: Frankenstein, Film, and the Anthropotechnical Interface placed it within the genre of horror and sexploitation. The Oklahoma Gazette recommended its readers instead watch Weird Science. A review from JoBlo.com criticized the film's script, but said viewers "might get a chuckle" from watching it.

== Plot ==
Bikini Frankenstein opens with credits stating, "Based on the classic novel by Mary Shelley".

Dr. Victor Frankenstein is a professor of science working at an institution called State University. Professor Frankenstein is shown engaging in relations in his classroom with Debbie one of his science students. They are discovered by Professor Frankenstein's rival, Clive, who reports them to the Dean of the university, Professor Van Sloane, and brings Van Sloane to the classroom. Debbie is Van Sloane's daughter, and Professor Van Sloane promptly removes Dr. Frankenstein from his role at the university.

Five years later, Dr. Frankenstein is shown having moved back home to Transylvania, to continue working on his research with his assistant, Ingrid. After sleeping with her, he succeeds in bringing the body of Eve, a deceased woman, back to life using energy from a lightning storm. After Eve is brought back to life, she kisses Ingrid and the two become physical with each other in Dr. Frankenstein's laboratory.

Dr. Frankenstein, Eve, and his assistant Ingrid all travel back to America, where Dr. Frankenstein impresses Van Sloane, Dr. Waldman, Dr. Frankenstein's rival Clive, and Claudia, Clive's wife. Dr. Frankenstein originally presents Eve as a sister of Ingrid, in order to for them to become familiar with Eve prior to revealing her true nature as a revived corpse. Dr. Frankenstein leaves for his hotel room to retrieve an object, leaving Eve and Ingrid at Clive's residence. Clive asks Claudia to follow Frankenstein and find out what he is up to, leaving Eve alone with Clive. Clive gives Eve a tour of his residence, and the two fornicate in his office. Claudia meets Dr. Frankenstein at his hotel room and they engage in relations in his room.

Once the group reconvenes their meeting with Eve at Clive's residence, Dr. Frankenstein is met initially with skepticism after revealing the true nature of Eve to the group of assembled onlookers. He provides the death certificate for Eve as a way to verify his scientific claims. Ingrid and Claudia escort Eve to a private room to prepare her for a physical examination. Following an erotic ceremony involving all three women, Eve explodes due to an overdose of excitation. Dr. Frankenstein is undeterred, and proclaims to the group that he will labor further on his experiment at a later date with another deceased body.

== Cast ==
- Frankie Cullen as Dr. Victor Frankenstein
- Jayden Cole as Eve
- Brandin Rackley as Ingrid
- Christine Nguyen as Claudia
- Billy Chappell as Clive
- Ted Newsom as Professor Van Sloane
- Ron Ford as Dr. Waldman
- Alexis Texas as Debbie

== Production ==
Bikini Frankenstein was directed by Fred Olen Ray. Ray wrote the screenplay as well. The film was produced by the production company Retromedia Entertainment. It was broadcast several times in Summer 2010 at fixed times and on demand on the premium channel Cinemax. It was released on DVD on January 19, 2010. The first indications of the movie Bikini Frankenstein were shown in the movie Bikini Airways. However, the film wasn't shown for a very long time, and the title was dismissed as a hoax. Later, due to the high demand of Cinemax, director Fred Olen Ray resurrected the title Bikini Frankenstein. The film was shot simultaneously with Twilight Vamps. It was released on DVD by BayView Entertainment on December 11, 2012. The film distribution company Full Moon Empire acquired the rights to broadcast and release to DVD Bikini Frankenstein, with their 2018 acquisition of New City Releasing's Torchlight Pictures.

== Reception ==
Writing in The New Annotated Frankenstein, editor Leslie Klinger described the film as, "Soft porn, about an evil doctor who creates an undead sex kitten." Shane Denson wrote in the 2014 book Postnaturalism: Frankenstein, Film, and the Anthropotechnical Interface that he would place the film within the genre of either "horror/porn or horror/sexploitation". The book Nightmare Movies described it as "video 'product'" directed and produced by Fred Olen Ray. The Oklahoma Gazette wrote of the film's genre, "at least one can't fault Bikini Frankenstein for saying it's based on Mary Shelley's novel, because the core idea of "man creates monster" is indeed there." Dr. Gore's Movie Reviews reviewed Jayden Cole's performance, while Mitch Lovell of The Video Vacuum declared the film as weak, compared to the performances of Christine Nguyen and Brandin Rackley. Tarstarkas.net rated the film 8 out of 10. Obscure Horror wrote, "It's a fun, entertaining film, with plenty of gorgeous folks and countless soft-core sex scenes." HK and Cult Film News praised the film, given the allusions of earlier Frankenstein movies, the music and the cinematography. A review of Bikini Frankenstein on JoBlo.com called it "dumb as a box of hammers" but "not entirely useless" and told the reader, "You might get a chuckle ... out of it". The Oklahoma Gazette recommended readers instead watch Weird Science by John Hughes. Will Pfeifer wrote, "it wins the 'best title of the week award' hands down." Chace Thibodeaux praised the female actresses in the film, writing, "It’s saving grace is the female cast." Thibodeaux highlighted in particular the acting of Alexis Texas, Brandin Rackley, Jayden Cole, and Christine Nguyen.
