= Alexis Texas =

American pornographic actress

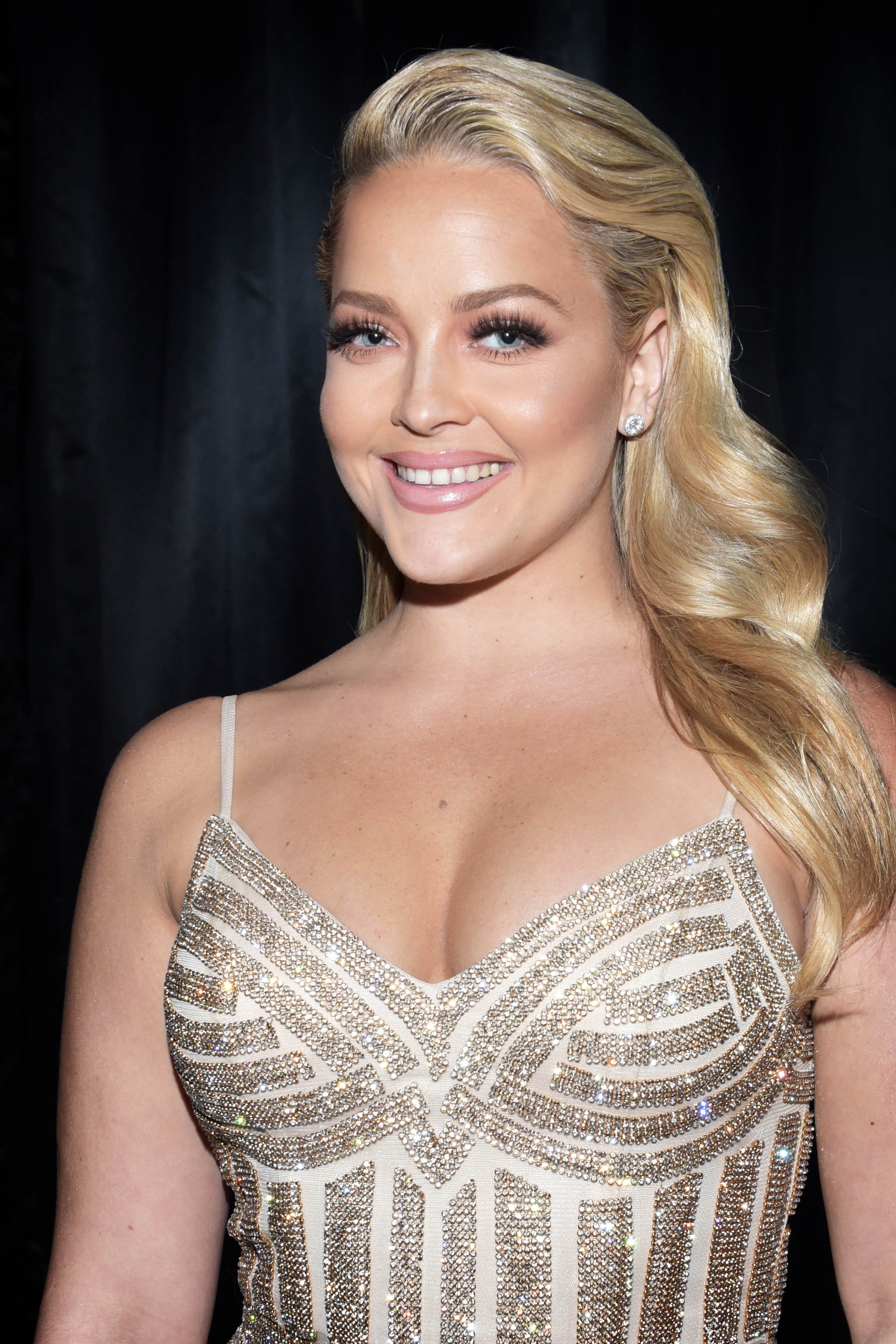
- Alexis Texas in 2017
- Born: Naval Base Panama Canal Zone
- Occupation: Pornographic film actress
- Years active: 2006–present
- Spouse: Mr. Pete (m. 2008; div. 2013)
- Awards: AVN Awards; XBIZ Award; F.A.M.E. Award; NightMoves Awards

Alexis Texas is an American pornographic film actress. In 2020, Texas was characterized as one of "the most popular porn performers", based on her Instagram following. She was inducted into the AVN Hall of Fame in 2022.

== Early life and education ==
Alexis Texas was born in the Naval Base Panama Canal Zone, which at the time was an exclave of the United States within Panama, but was raised in Castroville, Texas. She is of Puerto Rican, Norwegian, and German descent. She attended Texas State University, studying respiratory care therapy. At age 21, while working at a restaurant, she was offered a job in the adult industry.

== Career ==
=== Pornographic acting and recognition ===
Texas's first scene was with Jack Venice in Shane's World's College Amateur Tour in Texas, filmed in October 2006, followed by several scenes for Bang Bros in Florida. She moved to Los Angeles and began shooting scenes for LA Direct Models in March 2007. Adult performer Belladonna directed Discovering Alexis Texas, released in February 2008. Later that year, she won the NightMoves Award for Best New Starlet. Genesis magazine featured Texas on its cover in April 2009, as did Hustler on the magazine's 35th anniversary edition in June 2009. Best of Hustler Magazine and Hustler XXX featured Texas on their covers that year. Texas launched her official website and formed her own company, Alexis Texas Entertainment, as a subsidiary of Starlet Entertainment Group, in 2009. Her website won an XBIZ Award for Performer Site of the Year. In 2010, Maxim named her one of the 12 top female stars in porn. She was credited the same year with an acting role in the film Bikini Frankenstein. In 2012, she was named by CNBC as one of the 12 most popular stars in porn.

=== Mainstream cinema and directing ===
In 2011, Texas starred in the comedy horror film Bloodlust Zombies. She also appeared in the music video for "Bandz a Make Her Dance" by Juicy J in 2012. By 2012, Texas had appeared in over 400 adult films. That year, she signed an exclusive, one-year contract with the company Adam & Eve. The Big Butt Book, published in 2010, featured her as the cover model. In its review of the book, Erotic Review called Texas "arguably the most celebrated butt in porn nowadays". In 2013, she was one of the 16 actresses portrayed in Deborah Anderson's documentary film Aroused. In its review of the film, The Hollywood Reporter described her as a "well-known" porn star. The Los Angeles Times was critical of Aroused, writing, "Completist fans of such performers as Alexis Texas, Katsuni, and Misty Stone are the only likely viewers liable to find the documentary satisfying." She subsequently appeared, via archival footage, in the 2013 romantic comedy film Don Jon, written and directed by Joseph Gordon-Levitt. Best of Hustler Magazine featured her again as its cover girl in 2014.

In June 2015, Elegant Angel signed her to an exclusive directing contract. Her directorial debut, Big Booty Tryouts, was released the following month. She appeared in all the film's scenes, which were the first ones she had shot after a nearly two-year hiatus from performing. Texas directed a cast that included Anikka Albrite, Abella Danger, AJ Applegate, Keisha Grey, and Dani Daniels. She also directed The Real Buttwoman Returns, which featured her first gangbang scene. Texas was selected as co-host of the 2015 AVN Awards. She signed an exclusive acting deal with Elegant Angel in 2016.

=== Music ===
In 2021, Texas appeared as a dancer in a music video for "Tehran, Tokyo" by Iranian pop/hip-hop musician Sasy.

=== Social media and evolving career ===
In her 2018 book Female Genital Cosmetic Surgery, gender studies scholar Camille Nurka described Texas as "one of the most successful porn stars of the last decade". The same year, in the song "Yacht Club" on the album Nuthin' 2 Prove, rapper Lil Yachty included her as a pop culture reference. Texas directed Kleio Valentien, Jenna Foxx, Sammie Six, Dava Foxx, Jayde Cole, Ana Foxxx, and Zoey Monroe in the 2019 Elegant Angel release Alexis Texas: Lesbian House Party. Las Vegas Weekly observed in 2019 that Texas was a sought-after guest and "perennially popular" at the annual AVN Adult Entertainment Expo. In his 2020 book Human Resource Management in the Pornography Industry author David M. Kopp noted Texas was one of "the most popular porn performers", according to her large following on Instagram. She released her podcast via Apple Podcasts, YouTube, and Podbay.fm. Texas interviewed singer-songwriter and record producer Ne-Yo on her podcast in February 2020. Texas returned to acting briefly in 2023, filming her first interracial scenes in her career.

== Personal life ==
She was married to pornographic actor Mr. Pete from 2008 to 2013.

== Awards and nominations ==
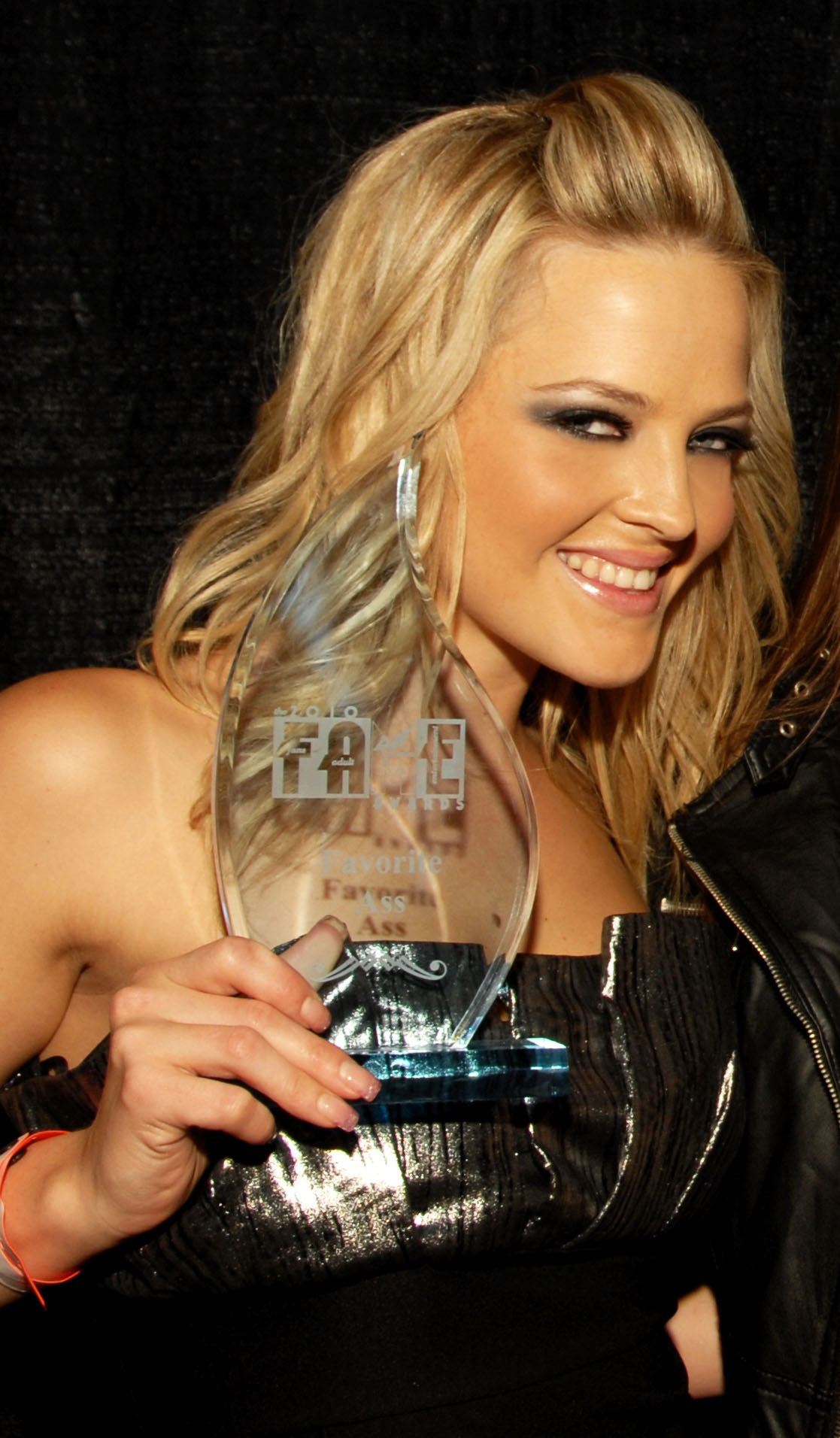
Alexis Texas with her 2010 F.A.M.E. Award trophy for "Favorite Ass".

Year	Award	Category	Work	Result	Ref.
2008	NightMoves Award	Best New Starlet (Fan's Choice)	—N/a	Won	
2009	AVN Award	Female Performer of the Year	—N/a	Nominated	
2009	AVN Award	Best All-Sex Release	Alexis Texas Is Buttwoman	Won	
2009	XRCO Award	Best Gonzo Release	Alexis Texas Is Buttwoman	Won	
2009	NightMoves Award	Best All Sex/Gonzo Release (Editor's Choice)	Alexis Texas Is Buttwoman	Won	
2009	XBIZ Award	Female Performer of the Year	—N/a	Nominated	
2010	AVN Award	Best All-Girl Group Sex Scene (with Eva Angelina, Teagan Presley, Sunny Leone)	Deviance	Won	
2010	AVN Award	Best Couples Sex Scene (with Johnny Sins)	Performers of the Year 2010	Nominated	
2010	F.A.M.E. Award	Favorite Ass	—N/a	Won	
2011	AVN Award	Female Performer of the Year	—N/a	Nominated	
2011	AVN Award	Best All-Girl Three-Way Sex Scene (with Kristina Rose & Asa Akira)	Buttwoman vs. Slutwoman	Won	
2011	AVN Award	Best Group Sex Scene (with Kristina Rose, Gracie Glam & Michael Stefano)	Buttwoman vs. Slutwoman	Won	
2011	AVN Award	Best Tease Performance (with Eva Angelina)	Car Wash Girls	Won	
2011	NightMoves Award	Best Female Performer (Fan's Choice)	—N/a	Won	
2012	NightMoves Award	Best Ass (Fan's Choice)	—N/a	Won	
2012	AVN Award	Female Performer of the Year	—N/a	Nominated	
2013	XBIZ Award	Performer Site of the Year	AlexisTexas.com	Won	
2013	Sex Award	Favorite Porn Star Website	AlexisTexas.com	Won	
2013	AVN Award	Female Performer of the Year	—N/a	Nominated	
2014	AVN Award	Hottest Ass (Fan Award)	—N/a	Won	
2014	XBIZ Award	Best Supporting Actress	Superman vs. Spider-Man XXX: An Axel Braun Parody	Nominated	
2014	XBIZ Award	Female Performer of the Year	—N/a	Nominated	
2014	XBIZ Award	Best Scene – All Girl	—N/a	Nominated	
2014	XBIZ Award	Gonzo Release of the Year	The Insatiable Miss Alexis Texas	Nominated	
2014	Fanny Award	Most Heroic Ass	—N/a	Won	
2015	AVN Award	Hottest Ass (Fan Award)	—N/a	Won	
2015	NightMoves Award	Best Butt (Fan's Choice)	—N/a	Won	
2016	AVN Award	Best All-Girl Group Sex Scene (with Angela White & Anikka Albrite)	Angela 2	Won	
2016	AVN Award	Most Epic Ass (Fan Award)	—N/a	Won	
2016	AVN Award	Most Epic Ass (Fan Award)	—N/a	Won	
2018	AVN Award	Most Epic Ass (Fan Award)	—N/a	Won	
2020	AVN Award	Best All-Girl Series or Channel	Alexis Texas Roadtrip	Nominated	
2022	AVN Award	AVN Hall of Fame	—N/a	Won	
2025	Fanny Award	Lifetime Achievement Award	—N/a	Won	

== See also ==
- List of pornographic film actors who have appeared in mainstream films
