= Maverick Entertainment Group =

- Industry: Entertainment
- Founded: 1997
- Headquarters: Deerfield Beach, Florida, United States
- Key people: Doug Schwab (CEO)
- Products: DVDs, motion pictures, television programs
- Website: maverickentertainment.cc

Maverick Entertainment Group is a low-budget American independent motion picture and DVD distribution company founded by Doug Schwab in 1997, and based in Deerfield Beach, Florida.

== Releases ==
- The Workout Room (2019)
- Why She Cries (2015)
- Be My Teacher (2011)
- Ex$pendable (2010)
- Spike (2010)
- Director (2010)
- She's Crushed (2010)
- London Betty (2010)
- Treasure Raiders (2009)
- Fast Track: No Limits (2008)
- Star Quest: The Odyssey
- Bad Reputation (2007)
- Cain and Abel (2007)
- Kush (2007)
- Tweek City (2007)
- Bob and Margaret (2006)
- F4 Vortex (2006)
- Demons at the Door (2004)
- This Thing of Ours (2002)
