= Beach Heat: Miami =

- Genre: Drama
- Starring: Megan Hauserman; Kristen Hinton; Tristian Lier; Tina Jordan; Christina Galioto; Robert Paget; Tommy Groth; Chastity Lynn; Romeo Price; Kiara Mia; Kevin Spencer; Pepper Kester; Savannah Stern; Nick Manning
- Country of origin: United States
- Original language: English
- No. of seasons: 2
- No. of episodes: 26

Production
- Running time: 30 minutes
- Production companies: Beach Heat, LLC

Original release
- Network: Showtime
- Release: August 5, 2010 – March 8, 2012

Beach Heat: Miami is an American dramedy television series set in Miami Beach, Florida. The show is fashioned after Baywatch and showcases the professional and personal lives of a motley crew of lifeguards. The show was shot exclusively in South Florida and lasted two seasons, with entirely different casts in each.

== Cast ==
- Christina Galioto as Lt. Melanie Harper (season 1)
- Kristen Hinton as Brooke Jordan (season 1)
- Josh Randall as Cale (season 1)
- Tristian Lier as Chloe (season 1)
- Tina Jordan as Lana (season 1)
- Megan Hauserman as Amber (season 1)
- Chastity Lynn as Cassidy Romano (season 2)
- Romeo Price as Christian Fletcher (season 2)
- Kiara Mia as Ariel Drake (season 2)
- Kevin Spencer as Jordan Whitcome (season 2)
- Pepper Kester as Haley Walker (season 2)
- Savannah Stern as Roxanne Riley (season 2)
- Nick Manning as Jack Foster (season 2)

== Episodes ==
=== Season 1: 2010 ===
No. overall	No. in season	Title	Directed by	Written by	Original release date
1	1	"Virgin Meat on the Beach"	Bill Fisher	Bill Fisher & Emily Rigby	August 5, 2010
2	2	"Hang and Bang"	Bill Fisher	Bill Fisher & Emily Rigby	August 12, 2010
3	3	"Trolling for Trouble"	Unknown	Unknown	August 19, 2010
4	4	"The Safe Word Is Monkey"	Unknown	Unknown	August 26, 2010
5	5	"The Wrong Drink Can Lead to an STD"	Unknown	Unknown	September 2, 2010
6	6	"Payback and Prostitution"	Unknown	Unknown	September 9, 2010
7	7	"Make Up Sex"	Unknown	Unknown	September 16, 2010
8	8	"Sex with the Boss"	Bill Fisher	Emily Rigby	September 23, 2010
9	9	"Sabotage Sex"	Bill Fisher	Emily Rigby	September 30, 2010
10	10	"Old Habits and New Tricks"	Bill Fisher	Emily Rigby	October 7, 2010
11	11	"Forced to Cheat"	Unknown	Unknown	October 14, 2010
12	12	"Spreading Her Wings, I Mean Legs"	Unknown	Unknown	October 21, 2010
13	13	"Karma and Cocaine Hook Ups"	Unknown	Unknown	October 28, 2010

=== Season 2: 2011–12 ===
No. overall	No. in season	Title	Directed by	Written by	Original release date
14	1	"Back to the Beach"	Unknown	Unknown	December 15, 2011
15	2	"Lifeguard Chicks Are Hot"	Unknown	Unknown	December 22, 2011
16	3	"Blinded by Booty"	Unknown	Unknown	December 29, 2011
17	4	"Dirty Pictures Private Play"	Unknown	Unknown	January 5, 2012
18	5	"Roxanne Gets Laid and Played"	Unknown	Unknown	January 12, 2012
19	6	"Bangin' Sparks"	Mark Stone	Story by : Gary Miller & Tasha Tacosa; Teleplay by : Tasha Tacosa & Mark Stone	January 19, 2012
20	7	"The Sluttiest Delinquents in South Beach"	Unknown	Unknown	January 26, 2012
21	8	"Quickies and Limbo Lines"	Unknown	Unknown	February 2, 2012
22	9	"Love or Lust, Let's Just Get It On"	Unknown	Unknown	February 9, 2012
23	10	"Sexting Takes Two"	Mark Stone	Story by : Gary Miller & Tasha Tacosa; Teleplay by : Tasha Tacosa & Mark Stone	February 16, 2012
24	11	"The Girlfriend Experience"	Unknown	Unknown	February 23, 2012
25	12	"Bikinis and Martinis"	Unknown	Unknown	March 1, 2012
26	13	"Goodbye South Beach"	Unknown	Unknown	March 8, 2012
