= Cain and Abel (2006 film) =

American comedy film

- Film poster
- Directed by: Shane Woodson
- Written by: Shane Woodson
- Produced by: Shane Woodson; Terrence Flack; Christy Oldham
- Starring: Shane Woodson; Terrence Flack; Flavor Flav; Scott L. Schwartz; Bridget Powers; Sarah Jones
- Cinematography: Brian Hanish; Kalani Prince
- Edited by: Michael Spirytus
- Music by: Mel & Lewis; Gregory J. Bennett
- Production company: Mercury Rising Films
- Distributed by: Maverick Entertainment Group
- Release dates: June 2006 (Dances With Films Festival); September 4, 2007 (United States)
- Running time: 91 minutes
- Country: United States
- Language: English

Cain and Abel is a 2006 American independent urban comedy film written and directed by Shane Woodson.

== Production ==
Woodson spent a year revising his script. The concept took three years to bring to film and was shot in 42 days. Post-production was completed in September 2005, screened at several festivals through 2006, before purchase and release in 2007 by Maverick Entertainment Group.

== Background ==
The film follows the mis-adventures of on-the-take good-hearted LA cops John Abel and Malcolm Cain. Set in modern Los Angeles, the film uses a 1970s feel, with the leads dressed in 1970s garb and driving a 1969 Chevy.

The film includes supporting roles by TV reality star Flavor Flav, as Slim Jim, and Terrence Flack from TV's Everybody Hates Chris and The Shield, as Malcolm Cain. Other supporting roles are played by Shane Woodson from Zodiac, Resident Evil: Extinction, NBC's Las Vegas television series and Sarah Jones.

== Cast ==
- Shane Woodson as John Abel
- Terrence Flack as Malcolm Cain
- Flavor Flav as Slim Jim
- Scott L. Schwartz as Yuri
- Bridget Powers as Little Vito
- Sarah Jones as Jennifer Proctor
- Yogi as Lt. Carter
- Christy Oldham as Evette Spelling
- Lola Davidson as Angela Addison
- Jason Fulk as Lt. Proctor
- Carlos Love as Big G
- Bob Campbell as The Chief
- Nathan Inzerillo as Manush
- Tonya Jeanaye as Pearl
- Hans Uder as Constantine Federov
- Igor Jadrovski as Dmitri Federov

== Recognition ==
John Wirt of The Advocate wrote that the film was a "pure comedy" that "plays like Starsky & Hutch meets Superfly".

=== Accolades ===
- 2006, Audience Choice Award, Other Venice Film Festival
- 2006, Official Selection, Dances With Films Film Festival
