= The Invisible Maniac =

1990 American science fiction comedy film

- Directed by: Adam Rifkin (as "Rif Coogan")
- Written by: Adam Rifkin (as "Rif Coogan")
- Starring: Noel Peters; Shannon Wilsey
- Cinematography: James Bay
- Edited by: Ron Resnick
- Music by: Marc David Decker
- Production company: Smoking Gun Productions
- Distributed by: Republic Pictures
- Release date: July 13, 1990
- Running time: 86 minutes
- Country: United States
- Language: English

The Invisible Maniac (also known as The Invisible Sex Maniac) is a 1990 American comedy horror film written and directed by Adam Rifkin (under the pseudonym "Rif Coogan") and starring Noel Peters and Shannon Wilsey.

== Plot ==
A psychiatrist informs the mother of young Dornwinkle that he is a genius, but has the potential for madness; however, with proper nurturing, he will be fine. The mother catches her son peeping at a neighbor undressing. She berates him as a sexual deviant and tells him that women are evil, traumatizing young Dornwinkle. Twenty years later, Dornwinkle, now a scientist specializing in molecular reconstruction, provides a demonstration of his invisibility serum to a group of the world's most prestigious scientists. The demonstration fails miserably and the scientists humiliate Dornwinkle. Dornwinkle goes into a rage and murders four of them. He is convicted of quadruple homicide, but rather than being sent to prison, he is sent to a psychiatric hospital for the criminally insane.

After escaping from the hospital, Dornwinkle is hired as a substitute high school physics teacher under the pseudonym Dr. Kevin Smith. The students devise a plot to harass their new teacher, which Dornwinkle overhears. Meanwhile, Dornwinkle continues to work on his invisibility serum, which is eventually successful. After taking the serum, Dornwinkle notes the effects it has on his dreams, fantasizing about the girls he teaches. The students execute their plan to harass Dornwinkle, which makes him angrier and angrier. Mrs. Cello, the principal of the school, who has already seduced one student, attempts to seduce Dornwinkle. When he rebuffs her advances, she threatens to fire him and call the police. He then pretends to decide to accept her sexual proposal, but kills her instead with a letter opener. This event, combined with the side effects of the invisibility serum, puts him over the edge and sends him on a killing spree.

Now invisible, he kills Bubba with a sandwich and Betty with a fire hose. Next, he kills Joan by drowning her in a fish tank and strangles April. He then proceeds to kill Vicky in the girls' shower by throwing a radio into the water, electrocuting her, while Gordon waits outside. Gordon discovers Vicky's body and is assaulted and chased by Dornwinkle, who is still invisible. Gordon is killed when he is thrown off the roof of the school. After having sex in Mrs. Cello's office, not noticing her dead body, Chet and Bunny discover Vicky's body in the girls' locker room. They blame the mute janitor, Henry, and proceed to beat him up. Dornwinkle attacks Chet and Bunny. Chet initially gets the upper hand and Dornwinkle's visibility returns. However, Dornwinkle is eventually able to overpower Chet and kills Bunny by repeatedly jumping on her body. Presuming Chet to also be dead, Dornwinkle returns to his apartment. Chet shows up with a shotgun, but Dornwinkle is able to inject himself with the invisibility serum and takes the gun away from Chet. Chet finds the invisibility serum and injects himself. Both invisible, they fight each other. Someone is killed with the shotgun, blowing their entire head off. The police arrive and assume Dornwinkle committed suicide, but it is revealed that it is Chet's body when Dornwinkle's serum wears off.

Newscaster Tammy Edwards later reports the story of Dornwinkle's suicide and murder spree. The invisible Dornwinkle then tears off her shirt, laughing hysterically.

== Cast ==
- Noel Peters as Kevin Dornwinkle
- Shannon Wilsey as Vicky
- Stephanie Blake as Mrs. Cello
- Melissa Moore as Bunny
- Clement von Franckenstein as Dr. McWaters
- Jason Logan Harris as Henry
- Robert R. Ross, Jr. as Chet
- Rod Sweitzer as Gordon
- Eric Champnella as Bubba
- Kalei Shallabarger as Joan
- Gail Lyon as April
- Debra Lamb as Betty
- Marilyn Adams as Mrs. Dornwinkle
- Dana Bentley as Tammy Edwards
- Matt Devlen as Officer O'Malley
- Anthony Markwell as Officer DeBoner
- Kris Russell as Young Kevin Dornwinkle
- Tracy Walker as Girl in Telescope
- Julie Strain as Girl in Henry's dream
