= Oklahoma Gazette =

- Type: Alternative weekly
- Format: Tabloid
- Owner: Tierra Media Group
- Publisher: Matt Dinger, Kelsey Lowe
- creative director: Berlin Green
- Founded: 1979
- Headquarters: Oklahoma City, Oklahoma, USA
- Circulation: 43,000
- OCLC number: 34589423
- Website: okgazette.com

The Oklahoma Gazette is a free alt-weekly online website featuring mostly news of Greater Oklahoma City restaurants, clubs, music and local trends. The Gazette was formerly a print weekly newspaper distributed throughout the Oklahoma City metro area via more than 800 now defunct rack locations and via its official website. It covers local and statewide news dealing with city government, education, politics, sustainability, food, restaurants, theater, and music. A notable feature of the Oklahoma Gazette is its Chicken-Fried News, where interesting, weird and obscure news from around the state is highlighted. On June 14, 2023, the Gazette announced their ceasing of print publication to focus on digital media.
