= Ed Powers =

American pornographic director, producer and actor

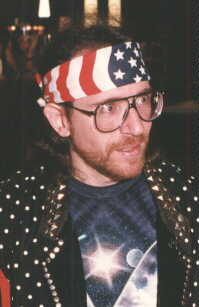
- Powers in September 2006
- Born: Mark Arnold Krinsky; October 25, 1954 (age 70); New York City, New York, U.S.
- Other names: Mark Arnold; Pugsley Wurshlurski
- Height: 5 ft 6 in (168 cm)
- Website: edpowers.com

Mark Arnold Krinsky (born October 25, 1954), better known as Ed Powers, is an American pornographic film director, producer, actor, and radio host. He is the owner of the porn production company Ed Powers Productions.

== Early life ==
Powers was born Mark Arnold Krinsky in the Brooklyn borough of New York City on October 25, 1954.

== Career ==
Powers is best known for his Dirty Debutantes porn series, which features amateur female performers (some making their porn debut) masturbating and having sex with both male and female performers, as well as his prurient fascination with female masturbation and anal sex. The series has introduced many new porn actresses and helped those already in the business. Jamie Gillis was initially a co-producer on the series. Mimi Miyagi also made her debut with Powers. Aurora Snow's first film was More Dirty Debutantes 152.

Powers twice filmed scenes with former Family Matters child star Jaimee Foxworth. In 2001, Sunrise Adams made her debut in More Dirty Debutantes 186, though she later referred to the experience of making the film as "nothing [she] want[s] to remember". Katie Morgan's first scene was in Dirty Debutantes 197. Lisa Sparxxx, who would later go onto the break the world record for having sex with the most men in one day, made her film debut in Dirtier Debutants #4 in 2003. Audrey Hollander's first scene was in More Dirty Debutantes 268. In 2005, HIV positive adult actress Brooke Ashley returned to the adult industry in Dirty Debutantes 328. She was filmed having sex with her boyfriend Eddie Wood, who is also HIV positive.

Powers hosted a late-night weekend radio talk show on 97.1 KLSX in Los Angeles, known as Bedtime Stories, in which various guests connected with sex in some way; the show hosted swingers, prostitutes, and porn stars, who would talk with Powers about sex and take listener calls. His co-host was a young Latina woman named Elizabeth who had performed in a number of his films under the pseudonym Bonita. Guests included Bridget Powers, Luke Ford and Max Hardcore. The radio show was rated number one in its time slot.

Powers made a one-time appearance in the professional wrestling promotion Pro Wrestling Guerrilla to support wrestlers Top Gun Talwar and Hook Bomberry. In 2008, he released a book about the adult film industry called Naked, and produced a documentary of the same name that featured adult performers such as Buck Angel. In 2009, he appeared in the film Crank: High Voltage.

== Personal life ==
Powers was severely affected by the 2008 financial crisis, and his home in the Granada Hills neighborhood of Los Angeles was foreclosed by Wells Fargo.

== Awards ==
- 1996 AVN Awards – Reuben Sturman Memorial Award
- 1998 XRCO Awards – XRCO Hall of Fame
- 2001 AVN Awards – Reuben Sturman Memorial Award
- 2003 AVN Awards – Best Pro-Am or Amateur Series for The Real Naturals
