= Tiptoes =

2003 film by Matthew Bright

- DVD cover
- Directed by: Matthew Bright
- Written by: Matthew Bright (Note: Bright removed his name from the film, and is credited as Bill Weiner.)
- Produced by: Elie Cohn; Chris Hanley; Fernando Sulichin; Douglas Urbanski; Brad Wyman
- Starring: Gary Oldman; Kate Beckinsale; Patricia Arquette; Matthew McConaughey; Peter Dinklage
- Cinematography: Sonja Rom
- Edited by: Paul Heiman
- Music by: Curt Sobel
- Production companies: StudioCanal; Canal+
- Distributed by: Reality Check Productions
- Release dates: December 17, 2002 (Butt-Numb-A-Thon); January 16, 2004 (United States)
- Running time: 90 minutes; 150 minutes (director's cut)
- Countries: United States; France
- Language: English

Tiptoes is a 2002 American comedy-drama film written and directed by Matthew Bright. The film stars Gary Oldman, Kate Beckinsale, Patricia Arquette, and Matthew McConaughey. The film's plot revolves around an average-sized man (McConaughey) who struggles with revealing to his pregnant fiancée (Beckinsale) that his entire family are dwarfs, as he worries that their unborn child may be born with dwarfism. The film attracted controversy for the casting of non-dwarf actor Gary Oldman as a dwarf. Oldman plays McConaughey's character's twin brother despite being eleven years older than him.

The film debuted in a 150-minute director's cut at Harry Knowles' Butt-Numb-A-Thon film festival on December 17, 2002. Bright was fired from the film during post-production, and subsequently had his screenwriting credit removed, after the film was re-edited without his involvement. The 90-minute producers' cut screened at the 2004 Sundance Film Festival, where Bright criticized the film and the producers for re-editing it. The film went on to receive negative reviews.

== Plot ==
Carol, a talented painter and independent woman, falls in love with Steven without knowing much about him other than feeling he is the perfect man. When Carol finds herself pregnant by Steven, he is forced to expose his darkest secret—his family. Steven happens to be the only average-sized person in a family of dwarfs, including his twin brother Rolfe. Carol and Steven are then forced to come to terms with the fact that the baby she carries may be born a dwarf. This terrifies Steven, who does not want his child to suffer the same way Rolfe did. As Carol decides to carry the child to term, she and Steven grow further apart, and she begins to rely on Rolfe to teach her about life as a dwarf.

== Cast ==
- Matthew McConaughey as Steven Bedalia
- Kate Beckinsale as Carol
- Gary Oldman as Rolfe Bedalia, Steven's twin brother
- Patricia Arquette as Lucy, Maurice's girlfriend
- Peter Dinklage as Maurice, Rolfe's best friend
- Debbie Lee Carrington as Kitty Katz
- Susan Barnes as Sylvia, Carol's mother
- Bridget Powerz as Sally, Rolfe's on-off girlfriend
- Ed Gale as Bobby Barry, Rolfe and Steven's uncle
- Shorty Rossi as Augie
- Michael J. Anderson as Bruno Bedalia, Rolfe and Steven's father
- Alexa Nikolas as Susan Barry
- David Alan Grier as Jerry Robin Jr.

== Production ==
Matthew Bright conceived the film when he was 18, as "a raucous comedy about little people fucking each other". Thirty years after the screenplay was written, Bright's stepfather gave a copy of the script to Cops creator John Langley, who was interested in producing Tiptoes.

Gary Oldman's portrayal of a dwarf was achieved through Oldman walking on his knees, and various prosthetics designed to hide his actual legs, as well as a double. Kate Beckinsale agreed to star in the film for scale if she would be allowed to wear her "lucky hat" during filming, and Bright agreed. On her first day of filming, the producers demanded that Bright tell her to remove the hat, and Bright refused, as this was the only reason she was in the film for a low salary. Arguments between Bright and producers persisted during filming.

After turning in his director's cut, Bright was fired from the film. The film was re-edited without Bright's involvement. Bright attempted to have his name removed from the film, but while he was allowed to remove his screenwriting credit, replacing it with the alias Bill Weiner, he could not remove his directing credit, as he was not a member of the Directors Guild.

== Release and reception ==
Tiptoes debuted in a 150-minute director's cut at Harry Knowles' Butt-Numb-A-Thon film festival on December 17, 2002. At the 2004 Sundance Film Festival, where the 90-minute version screened, Bright criticized the film and lambasted the producers for re-editing his film, leading them to drag him off stage. Subsequently, Bright would never direct another film; he later said the film's failure hurt his career.

The 90-minute producers' cut of Tiptoes received largely negative reviews. In particular, the casting of Gary Oldman as an individual with dwarfism was considered offensive to people with dwarfism, with Nathan Rabin comparing this casting to blackface. Co-star Peter Dinklage defended the casting. Another criticism was that Oldman, despite being 11 years older than McConaughey, played his twin brother.

Bill Gibron of PopMatters called the film "insensitive", adding: "Clearly crafted as a wake-up call to all the nasty 'normals' out there, it substitutes schmaltz for sincerity to create a heated hate crime all its own." Variety reviewer Lisa Nesselson described the film as "an honorable failure" that "comes up short in many departments", despite its "bracingly peculiar premise and astonishingly fine [performance] from Gary Oldman". Based on 9 reviews, the film carries a "rotten" rating of 22% at the aggregator website Rotten Tomatoes.

Dinklage said the director's cut of the film was "gorgeous", but criticized the producers' cut, calling it a "rom-com with dwarves". Oldman was included in BBC critic Mark Kermode's "Great Acting in Bad Films" in 2012. Film director Nicolas Winding Refn has expressed admiration for the film, and after hearing of Refn's fandom, producer Chris Hanley sent Refn a copy of the director's cut. Bright has expressed hope that his director's cut will be released one day.

In 2025, Gary Oldman admitted that he took the job to star in Tiptoes due to having the need to pay the bills. He also affirmed that despite his portrayal, he got along fine with co-star Peter Dinklage. He did state that he would never take a role like it again, though.
