= Tiger Orange =

- Film poster
- Directed by: Wade Gasque
- Written by: Wade Gasque; Mark Strano
- Starring: Mark Strano; Frankie Valenti; Gregory Marcel
- Cinematography: Lila Javan
- Production company: Picture Stable
- Distributed by: Wolfe Video
- Release date: 18 July 2014 (Outfest)
- Running time: 76 minutes
- Country: United States
- Language: English

Tiger Orange is a 2014 American drama film directed by Wade Gasque and written by Gasque and Mark Strano. The film starts Strano and Frankie Valenti as Chet and Todd, two gay brothers struggling to reconnect after their father's death.

== Plot ==
Chet, shy and reserved, has been living relatively closeted in the small town where the brothers grew up, running their father's hardware store and taking great care not to be too open about his sexuality in the town's relatively conservative social order. Todd, more upfront about his sexuality, left home at 18 to move to Los Angeles, where he has been struggling to build a career as an actor. Beyond the clash of personalities, they both envy aspects of the other's life; Chet observes Todd's freedom to live his life openly, while Todd regrets not having experienced Chet's sense of belonging to a close-knit community and having contact with their father. The tensions between them reach a peak when Brandon (Gregory Marcel), Chet's high school crush, also returns home to take care of his ailing mother. Chet continues to struggle with his feelings for Brandon while Todd actively pursues him.

== Release and reception ==
The film premiered on July 18, 2014 at Outfest. Strano won the festival's award for Best Actor in a Feature Film. Valenti's performance also drew praise from critics, with many calling attention to how unexpectedly strong it was for an actor previously known primarily for porn.

In a 2015 post for Indiewire's /Bent blog on LGBT film, Gasque described the film as having been inspired by the LGBT community's "subtle tug-of-war between our desire to stand out and our need to fit in."

The film was picked up by Wolfe Video for distribution on DVD, video on demand and digital media platforms in January 2015. It was released to those platforms in July 2015.
