= Barbara Dare =

American pornographic actress

- Born: February 27, 1963 (age 63); Wichita Falls, Texas, U.S.
- Other names: Kimberly Dare; Kim Wilde; Stacey Nixx; Stacey Nix
- Height: 5 ft 2 in (1.57 m)

Barbara Dare (born February 27, 1963) is an American former pornographic actress. She was one of the industry's initial contract performers with Essex Video and Vivid Entertainment and is an AVN and XRCO Hall of Fame inductee.

== Personal life ==
Barbara Dare was born on February 27, 1963 in Wichita Falls, Texas. After her father, a dentist, left the Air Force, the family moved to Wayne, New Jersey. She was raised in the Jewish faith. Early in her professional career, Dare self-identified as a lesbian, having personal relationships with women.

Dare spent several years addicted to drugs, including heroin. She got sober and became a Certified Addiction and Substance Abuse Counselor.

== Career ==
Dare began appearing in adult films in the mid-1980s after meeting people who were involved in the adult film industry at Plato's Retreat and also made appearances in magazines such as Hustler, Swank, and High Society. In 1989, she joined fellow adult film actress Stephanie Rage as authors of a monthly article for Swank.

Dare was one of the top adult film stars of the 1980s. She appeared in scenes with several (at the time) top adult films stars, including Tracey Adams and Ginger Lynn. She became one of the first women in the industry to sign an exclusivity contract with Essex Video for 10 movies a year and an annual salary of $150,000 and would later leave that studio to sign with Vivid Entertainment and become one of the earliest Vivid Girls. Dare's final film was Bratgirl (1992); she retired in 1994.

Jerry Butler stated in his autobiography that Dare had a "commanding screen presence" while on set, in spite of her smaller physical stature.

Dare also worked as a stripper, commanding a $10,000 weekly salary. The club "wound up making money with her. Place was packed."

=== Appearances ===
Dare was interviewed in 1987 for the episode of the television news series Frontline regarding the suicide of Shauna Grant.

She also had minor roles in mainstream productions such as the Roy Scheider and Ann-Margret film 52 Pick-Up in 1986 and the live-action/animated comedy-horror B-movie Evil Toons (where she was credited as "Stacey Nix") in 1992.

In the August 1992 issue of Esquire, Dare was profiled in their annual feature "Women We Love".

== Selected filmography ==
- Hannah Does Her Sisters (1986)
- Slippery When Wet (1986)
- Blame it on Ginger (1986)
- Barbara the Barbarian (1987)
- Ginger and Spice (1987)
- Girls who Dig Girls 8 (1988)
- Barbara Dare's Bad (1988)
- Angela Baron Takes a Dare (1988)
- Sex in Dangerous Places (1988)
- For Her Pleasure Only (1989)
- Ginger then and Now (1990)
- Where the Boys Aren't 2 (1990)
- Bratgirls (1992)

== Awards ==
- 1987 AVN Award – Best New Starlet
- 1987 XRCO Award – Starlet of the Year
- 1989 AVN Award – Best Actress, Video (Naked Stranger)
- 1990 AVN Award – Best All-Girl Sex Scene, Video (True Love) with April West
- AVN Hall of Fame inductee
- XRCO Hall of Fame inductee
