= Nick Manning =

American pornographic film actor & director (born 1967)

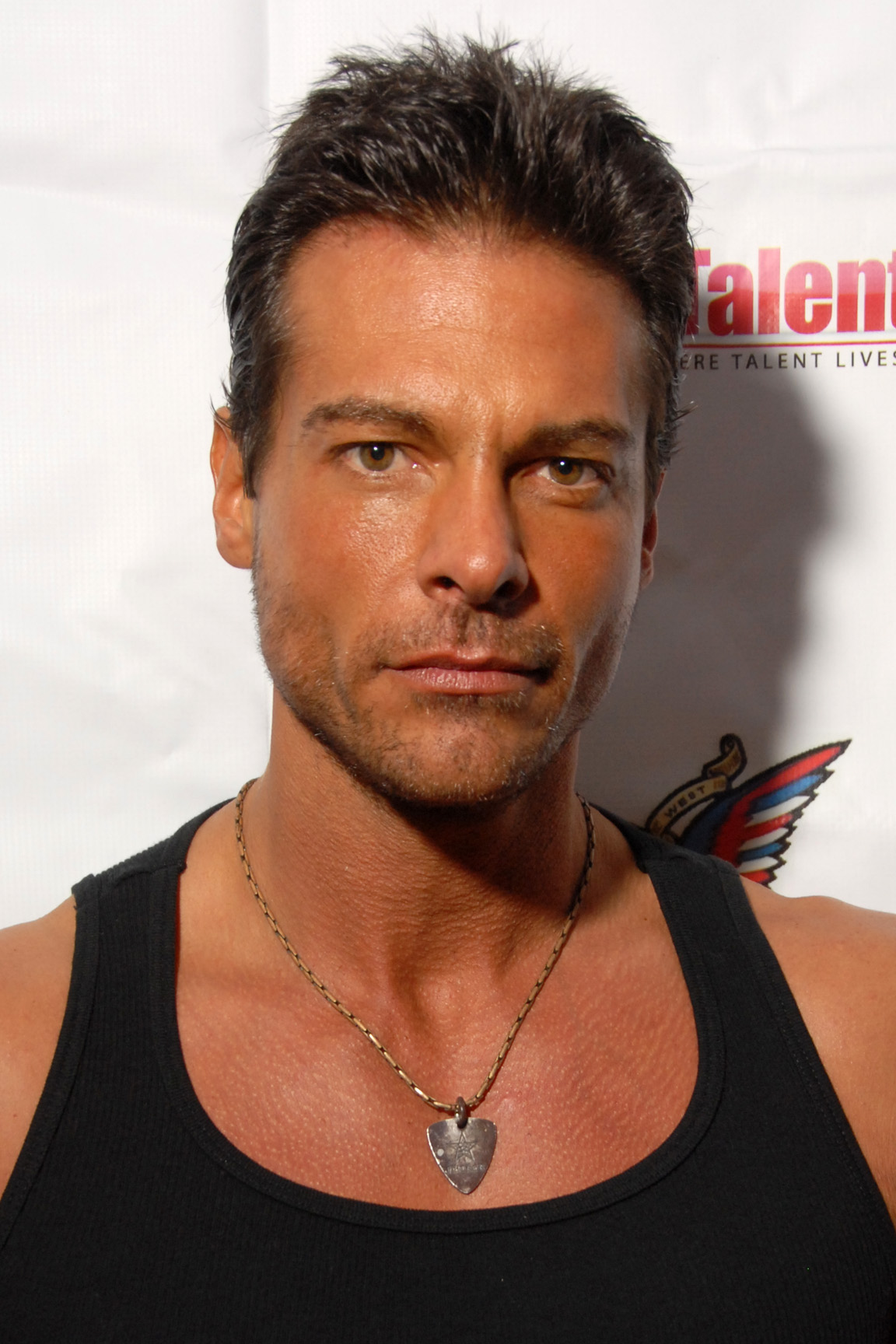
- Manning at Aqua Lounge, Beverly Hills, California, February 2010
- Born: May 28, 1967 (age 59); Chicago, Illinois, U.S.
- Height: 6 ft 2 in (1.88 m)

Nick Manning (born May 28, 1967) is an American pornographic actor and director. He has made several mainstream appearances, including Crank: High Voltage, Hogan Knows Best, and Sons of Anarchy. Manning portrayed a strip club owner in the 2011 independent film Cherry Bomb, his first non-pornographic lead role. In 2014, he was inducted into the AVN Hall of Fame.

== Early years ==
Manning was born in Chicago, Illinois.

== Mainstream appearances ==
For Cinemax in 2001, Manning appeared in Thrills. He made brief appearances on the reality show Hogan Knows Best and in the 2009 film Crank: High Voltage. Included in Nick Manning's roles within non-adult movies are For Love of the Game, Any Given Sunday, All My Children and the TV show The Fugitive. In 2012, he appeared as the head lifeguard "Jack Foster" in Showtime's Beach Heat. He filmed his first leading role in a non-adult film, playing the strip club owner "Ian Benedict" in the indie film Cherry Bomb.

== Awards ==
- 2003 AVN Award – Best Male Newcomer
- 2003 NightMoves Award – Best Actor (Editor's Choice)
- 2014 AVN Hall of Fame inductee

== Partial filmography ==
| Year | Title | Role | Notes |
|---|---|---|---|
| 2005 | Pornstar Pets | Himself | Documentary |
| 2005 | Hogan Knows Best | Himself | 1 episode |
| 2009 | Crank: High Voltage | Male Porn Star | |
| 2010 | BatfXXX: Dark Night Parody | The Bat | |
| 2011 | Cherry Bomb | Ian Benedict | Lead |
| 2012 | Beach Heat: Miami | Jack Foster | 2 episodes |
| 2014 | Lolita from Interstellar Space | Zarren | |

== See also ==
- Jenna Presley
