= Bridget Powers =

American pornographic actress (born 1980)

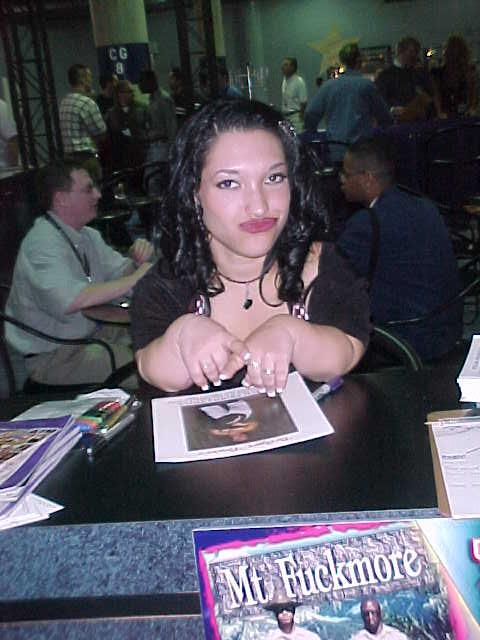
- Powers in 2000
- Born: October 11, 1980 (age 46); Boise, Idaho, U.S.
- Other names: Bridget Powerz; Bridget "the Midget" Powers; Bridgette; Cheryl Marie Murphy
- Occupation: Pornographic actress
- Height: 114 cm (3 ft 9 in)

Bridget Powers (born Cheryl Murphy; October 11, 1980) is an American pornographic actress with dwarfism. She is often credited as "Bridget the Midget" or with the alternate spelling "Bridget Powerz". Besides her adult work, she has also appeared in many films in either comedic or dramatic roles, such as Big Money Rustlas, Tiptoes, and S.W.A.T.. She also is the singer in the punk band Bridget and the Nameless.

== Early life ==
Powers was born in Boise, Idaho to a Guatemalan mother and Irish father. Her family moved to Burbank, California, when she was one year old, after which her parents divorced. She had a number of operations between the ages of three and fourteen to correct bowed legs; the results left her with one straight leg and one that points to the left. Powers has to wear a knee brace. Powers has an older sister, Vanessa, who she hasn't seen or spoken to since she was 18.

== Career ==
Powers was discovered at a goth nightclub by a man who was working as a make-up artist for a gothic vampire adult movie. She made her first porn film in 1999. By her own count, she appeared in 65 to 70 original films, with compilations bringing that up to over 110. She left the business, as she wished to do condom-only scenes yet many of the male performers would remove the condoms. Disillusioned with the exploitation of the porn film industry, she then set up her own video on demand website.

She was a co-host on Ed Powers' radio show Bedtime Stories. She was co-host of the Johnny Nerotic Live Show from 2002-2024 Appearing first in the pilot for the show in Nov,10th 2001.She is also in a band named Blakkout. In addition to her erotic film roles, she has appeared in several mainstream films, such as 8mm, Confessions of a Dangerous Mind, S.W.A.T., Wristcutters: A Love Story, I Hope They Serve Beer in Hell and independent films such as Almost Amateur, Tiptoes, and Lynsey does Jody 2 – Extreme Edition.

She appeared as herself in the 2002 HBO documentary series Cathouse: The Series, which explored the lives of the owners, management, staff and customers of the Moonlite BunnyRanch brothel in Mound House, Nevada. As "Bridget the Midget", she was featured in an episode of the History Channel series Wild West Tech. In 2006, she appeared on an episode of VH1's celebrity reality show, The Surreal Life. She has also appeared on The Howard Stern Show on E! She also played the role of Tink, Sheriff Sugar Wolf's love interest in the 2010 film Big Money Rustlas.

In 2022, Powers formed the punk band Bridget and the Nameless.

Since 2024, Powers has been touring the country with the "Micro Maidens", the world's smallest burlesque show, and "MicroMania" midget wrestling.

== Personal life ==
She has one son, who was born when Powers was 28. Powers has stated she remains on friendly terms with the father of her son, who has since remarried. On September 18, 2019, she was arrested and booked into the Clark County Detention Center after stabbing her boyfriend Jesse James in the leg at her home in Las Vegas, after discovering him in bed with another woman.

== Filmography ==
=== Film ===
Year	Title	Role	Notes
2002	Confessions of a Dangerous Mind	Little Person	
2003	Temptation	Rita's Porn Partner	
2003	S.W.A.T.	Self	
2003	Tiptoes	Sally	
2006	Wristcutters: A Love Story	Stripper	
2006	Cain and Abel	Little Vito	
2009	I Hope They Serve Beer in Hell	Rainbow Sprite	
2010	Big Money Rustlas	Tink	
2020	Tidy Tim's	Tiny Tammy	

=== Television ===
Year	Title	Role	Notes
2001–2004	The Johnny Nerotic show	Co host	
2001	The Andy Dick Show		Episode: "Blind Date"
2005	Cathouse: The Series	Self	3 episodes
2006	The Surreal Life	Self	Episode: "Tawny Takes on Flo Part: 2"
2013–2014	The League	Candy	2 episodes
