= Savannah (actress) =

American pornographic actress (1970–1994)

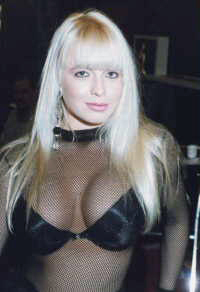
- Savannah in 1993
- Born: Shannon Michelle Wilsey; October 9, 1970; Laguna Beach, California, U.S.
- Died: July 11, 1994 (aged 23); Burbank, California, U.S.
- Other names: Silver Cane; Silver Kane; Savanah; Silver
- Occupation: Pornographic film actress
- Years active: 1988–1994
- Height: 5 ft 6 in (1.68 m)

Shannon Michelle Wilsey (October 9, 1970 – July 11, 1994), better known by her stage name Savannah, was an American pornographic film actress who starred in over 100 videos during her career. One of the most prominent adult industry models of her time, she achieved notoriety within her career due to her onscreen presence and personal life. In January 2002, AVN ranked her at #19 on its list of the top 50 porn stars of all time.

Wilsey reportedly took her stage name from Savannah Smiles (1982), a movie she enjoyed. Following a car crash that broke her nose, she died of suicide by firearm. She was taken to a hospital but her life support was eventually discontinued after it became clear that she would not survive her injury.

== Early life ==
Wilsey’s parents divorced when she was 2 years old. She grew up in Texas with her mother and then, after a brief stay with her father in Oxnard, California lived with her grandparents in Mission Viejo, California, where she attended high school and was a cheerleader. Wilsey told her manager, Nancy Pera, that she was sexually abused as a child.

== Career ==
Wilsey was introduced to the adult film industry by actor and director Rex Cabo. She started at first in photo spreads for Cheri, Hustler, Swank, and Penthouse, and then she signed an exclusive contract with Vivid Entertainment in 1991 and became one of the early Vivid Girls. Wilsey began using drugs and spending large amounts of money, and she reportedly had severe financial troubles despite her substantial income. She also garnered a reputation for arriving late to film shoots, being temperamental and acting like a diva, and sometimes getting drunk or abusing drugs during the film/video shoots. These antics eventually led to Vivid severing its association with her in 1993. She ended her career by mainly freelancing for lower-budget porn companies by capitalizing on her still big but clearly fading name in the industry. Wilsey also appeared in a variety of minor roles in B movies (mostly comedy, horror and/or sci-fi) in which she was credited with her real name. These roles included The Invisible Maniac (1990) and Camp Fear (1991). She also had a credit for her performance on a soundtrack in the video The Spectacle (1991). After her death, Wilsey continued to appear via archival footage. She appeared as Santana on Joe Bob's Drive-In Theater when the show aired Sorority House Massacre II (October 1994).

== Personal life ==
In a video interview for Vivid, Wilsey stated that the first time she saw "erotic material" was when she was "snooping through her parents' things" and found some magazines when she was 11 years old. She later stated that she used to watch porn videos with her boyfriend on his tour bus.

Per Rolling Stone Magazine, at 16 years of age in 1986, Shannon met musician Gregg Allman. They were involved in a relationship condoned by her mother until shortly before her 18th birthday in 1988.

Wilsey became involved in a long-term relationship with fellow pornographic actress Jeanna Fine, with whom she later claimed to have fallen deeply in love. In a 1999 interview, following the airing of the E! True Hollywood Story about Wilsey's life and death, Fine commented: "We had an ongoing, on-again, off-again, volatile, loving relationship. At that time, I was having a lot of problems myself. Between [male porn actor] Sikki Nixx and Savannah pushing and pulling, I pretty much at one point ran away from them both. I couldn't take it any longer. But I feel I left her behind when she needed me most. It's very sad."

Savannah also had relationships with singer Billy Idol, Mötley Crüe member Vince Neil, Van Halen frontman David Lee Roth, bassist Billy Sheehan who was in Roth's solo band, comedian Pauly Shore, Guns N' Roses guitarist Slash, and actor Mark Wahlberg. According to an interview with Adult Video News, Wilsey stated: "I love sex, and I love sex with rockers more than anything else."

== Death ==
Wilsey died by suicide in 1994 by shooting herself after a car accident. On the evening of July 11, Wilsey was involved in an auto accident with her Corvette in which she reportedly broke her nose and injured her face. Upset over the accident and worried that she would suffer permanent scarring on her face, she went home to Universal City, California, asked a friend to walk her dog, and then called her manager Nancy Pera. Shortly after, Wilsey shot herself. It was Pera who later discovered Wilsey in the garage of Wilsey's home. Wilsey did not die immediately; she died hours later in the hospital after her father decided to shut down her life support systems once it became obvious that she would not survive her injury. Wilsey's ex-boyfriend, comedian Pauly Shore, stated that he was with her when she died in St. Joseph's Hospital.

Wilsey's funeral, two days later, was attended by friends, family, and limited numbers of adult industry associates. Shore was the only one of her ex-boyfriends to attend the service. Of Wilsey, Shore said "She was the nicest, most beautiful girl I ever met...[her death] was a very dramatic thing for me." When asked why she killed herself, he said "She became Savannah. She became her character, who was into drugs, and needed reassurance all the time. She forgot who Shannon was...I knew she wanted out [of the porn business]." At the time, Wilsey's death was considered the third high-profile suicide in the adult industry, after fellow performers Shauna Grant and Megan Leigh. After her death, Bill Margold founded Protecting Adult Welfare (P.A.W.), a non-profit organization that provides counseling for adult performers in need. Her body was cremated and the ashes given to family and friends.

== Legacy ==
Film

After her death, Wilsey was profiled in two documentaries:

- The Playboy Entertainment Group produced Playboy: The Story of X (1998), which featured archival footage of her.
- The E! True Hollywood Story: "Savannah" (October 31, 1999) is dedicated to Wilsey's early life, family, career, and unexpected death.

Music

Songs that pay homage to Wilsey include:

- "Savannah Smiles" and "Starry Stairs" by Okkervil River
- "Savannah" by Zao
- "Savannah: Flights of Ecstasy" by Sheavy

Publications

- OC Weekly (February 2014) featured Wilsey, remembering her as not only a resident of Orange County, California, but as well as "Arguably the first superstar porn goddess of the 1990s".
- In 2015, actress Amber Tamblyn published her third book of poetry, Dark Sparkler, which features elegies and poems dedicated to numerous deceased actors. Wilsey is the subject of one such poem along with child actress Bridgette Andersen (1975–1997) who played the part of "Savannah" in Wilsey's favorite film, Savannah Smiles. Wilsey's poem is written as "a meta-poem, where she's writing for Bridgette Andersen, and telling her how they're the same."

== Awards ==
- 1992 AVN Award – Best New Starlet
- 1996 AVN Hall of Fame inductee

== Mainstream filmography ==
Year	Title	Role	Notes
1990	The Invisible Maniac	Vicky	Credited as Shannon Wilsey
1990	Sorority House Massacre II	Satana	Credited as Shannon Wilsey
1991	Camp Fear	Dorm Girl	Credited as Shannon Wilsey
1991	Legal Tender	Mal's Gals	
1999	E! True Hollywood Story	Herself (archive footage)	Episode: "Savannah"

== See also ==
- List of pornographic actors who appeared in mainstream films
