= Evil Toons =

1992 film by Fred Olen Ray

- Laserdisc cover
- Directed by: Fred Olen Ray
- Written by: Fred Olen Ray
- Produced by: Fred Olen Ray; Victoria Till
- Starring: David Carradine; Monique Gabrielle; Madison Stone; Barbara Dare; Dick Miller
- Cinematography: Gary Graver
- Edited by: Greg Shorer
- Music by: Chuck Cirino
- Production companies: American Independent Productions; Curb/Esquire Films
- Distributed by: Prism Entertainment Corporation
- Release dates: October 21, 1991 (American Film Market); January 8, 1992 (United States)
- Running time: 90 minutes
- Country: United States
- Language: English
- Budget: $140,000

Category:American animated horror films

Evil Toons is a 1992 American live-action/adult animated comedy horror B movie written and directed by Fred Olen Ray. This film is a light spoof of traditional haunted house films.

== Plot ==
In the early 1930s, a man by the name of Gideon Fisk hangs himself in the basement of his suburban mansion home, seemingly to spite a possessed book made of human skin. In the present day, a quartet of beautiful female college students are hired to clean the now-vacant mansion over the weekend. Upon arrival, they clean the basement and find a strange dagger hidden in a chest. That night, Gideon's cursed spirit delivers the book to them at his front door. The quartet then examine the book, finding it full of sketches of bizarre monsters, some engaged in depraved sex acts.

When an incantation in the book is read, one of the drawings emerges from the book and becomes a sentient cartoon. This thing stalks and attacks the sexually liberated Roxanne, taking on her physical form after murdering her, before doing the same to her arriving football player boyfriend, Biff Bullock. The demon then plans to collect the souls of everyone in the mansion so it can be freed from its imprisonment in the book, alongside its fellow demons. After finding Biff's corpse, the remaining women call their boss, Burt, but before he can help upon his arrival, he is lured away and murdered by the demon. The women eventually discover the demon, who then murders all of them except for the sexually inexperienced Megan.

Gideon returns and aids Megan in defeating the demon, stabbing it with the strange dagger. Before the demon can return to the safety of the book, Megan throws the book into the fireplace, incinerating it and erasing the demon from existence. After explaining that he had needed another mortal's corporeal strength to destroy the book and end his decades-long curse, Gideon ascends to the afterlife. All of the demon's victims are revived the next morning, only remembering their encounters with it as nightmares. Megan then becomes horrified when the neighbor, Mr. Hinchlow, comes over with his portable television set so that the group can watch Saturday-morning cartoons.

== Cast ==
- David Carradine as Gideon Fisk
- Monique Gabrielle as Megan
- Madison Stone as Roxanne
- Barbara Dare (credited as Stacey Nix) as Jan
- Arte Johnson as Mr. Hinchlow
- Dick Miller as Burt
- Suzanne Ager as Terry
- Don Dowe as Biff Bullock
- Michelle Bauer as Burt's unnamed wife
- Fred Olen Ray as the voice of the traditionally animated demon

== Production ==
The film was shot in an octet of days. Due to the low budget of the film, combined with the high cost of animation, the animated demon is only on screen for approximately 90 seconds in the film. Director Fred Olen Ray says that mainstream Hollywood executives would not finance the film, citing risk due to the premise. He was quoted saying "Even Roger Corman turned us down" and "He said it was too risky... so we did it ourselves."

The film has subtle connections to the universe of H.P. Lovecraft. Roxanne mentions Miskatonic University and the book which summons the demon into the mortal world resembles the Necronomicon.

== Release ==
On May 4, 2010, Infinity Entertainment Group released the 20th Anniversary Edition on DVD.

== Reception ==
The film had received a number of negative reviews. Rotten Tomatoes reports a score of 33% based on six reviews, with an average rating of 3.29/10. Critics were negative about the acting and dialogue in the film, as well as the animation quality in addition to how sparsely it appears throughout.

The 2000 book, horror film encyclopedia Creature Feature, gave the film two out of five stars, stating that it was a sorry excuse for a film in regards to wasting the talents of Carradine and Miller.
