= Tracey Adams =

American pornographic film actress

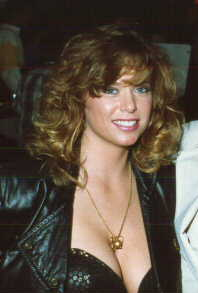
- Adams in 1986
- Occupation: Pornographic film actress

Tracey Adams is an American former pornographic film actress who has also appeared in mainstream films. She is an AVN Hall of Fame founding inductee.

== Career ==
Adams moved to the west coast in the early 1980s to pursue a career in entertainment. She worked in various jobs such as a commercial diver in San Diego. Later she began nude modeling before entering porn. By 1991, Adams began appearing less in American porn and usually was cast in mature roles. Adams also worked in European porn, becoming a celebrity there and appeared on billboards and guest starred on Italian soap operas.

In addition to her adult appearances, Adams has also appeared in mainstream movies, such as the comedy movies Wimps (1986) and Student Affairs (1987), the thriller Enrapture (1989), and the movie Killer (1990), credited as Deborah Blaisdell. She also appeared in the French TV movie La femme en noir (1988).

== 1987 incident ==
Adams testified in April 1987 in San Fernando Municipal Court in a case of two men charged with felony pandering in the production of sex videotapes. Adams and five other performers, among them Stacey Donovan and Steve Drake, testified that they were paid to go to a Sand Canyon home on June 18, 1986, and perform sex acts before cameras. Adams said she was paid to perform but not paid to have sex. The performers were hired by Cinderella Distributors, run by Charles Brickman and Thomas Ingalls. Adams and the other performers testified that Ingalls was the cameraman during the shooting session, and that they were paid in cash after the session. They said their daily pay ranged from $300 for Drake to $1,000 for Donovan. The felony pandering charges were later dropped against Brickman, who pleaded no contest and agreed to testify against Ingalls. He had faced a sentence of between 3 and 13 years in prison.

== Personal life ==
A 1991 article in the Los Angeles Times described Adams' off-screen life:

Although she is free-thinking, Adams is anything but the free-spirited sexual athlete her fans like to imagine. She worries about crime and overpopulation and drinks two vodkas medicinally each night to help her sleep. She sponsors two poverty-stricken children in foreign countries. Her rented bungalow in West Los Angeles might be the home of any anxious, PBS-watching, middle-level executive except for the catalog of her sex tapes hidden behind a wood plank on an upper shelf in a back room.

== Awards ==
- 1988 AVN Award – Best Couples Sex Scene, Video – Made in Germany
- 1988 XRCO Award – Best Copulation Scene – Pretty Peaches 2
- 1990 AVN Award – Best Tease Performance – Adventures of Buttman
- AVN Hall of Fame inductee
- 2000 XRCO Hall of Fame inductee
