= Cherry Bomb (film) =

- DVD cover
- Directed by: Kyle Day
- Screenplay by: Garrett Hargrove
- Story by: Kyle Day
- Produced by: Kyle Day; Garrett Hargrove; Jason Latimer
- Starring: Julin Jean; Nick Manning; John Gabriel Rodriguez; Allen Hackley; Jeremy James Douglas Norton; Aaron Alexander
- Cinematography: Andrew Michael Barrera
- Edited by: Kyle Day; David Ward
- Production company: Strike Anywhere Productions
- Distributed by: Well Go USA
- Release dates: June 11, 2011 (Portland Underground Film Festival); July 10, 2012 (United States; DVD)
- Running time: 82 minutes
- Country: United States
- Language: English

Cherry Bomb is a 2011 American action film starring Julin Jean and adult film star Nick Manning, in his first leading role in a mainstream film.

== Plot ==
Set in 1984 in a small Texas town, Cherry Bomb follows the story of Cherry, an exotic dancer who is sexually assaulted by a group of people in the club where she works. Upon waking in the hospital, Cherry soon comes to find that all of the people have escaped justice, seemingly due to the help of corrupt local law enforcement. Against all odds, Cherry teams up with her estranged brother and vows revenge against the people who left her emotionally and physically broken. But things don't always go as planned, and Cherry finds herself up against the police, a vicious hired gun, and a barrage of unexpected consequences as she strives for vengeance.

== Cast ==
- Julin Jean as Cherry
- Nick Manning as Ian Benedict
- John Gabriel Rodriguez as Brandon
- Allen Hackley as Bull
- Jeremy James Douglas Norton as Adam Berry
- Denise Williamson as Sapphire
- Charlotte Biggs as Punk Rock Polly
- Tony Bottorff as Barry Ford
- Lizabeth Waters as Marilyn Lewis
- Alan Brady as Rick Lewis
- Giovanni Antonello as Officer Tran
- D.J. Morrison as Detective Whitlock
- Sabrina Jones as Emerald
- Charissa Jarrett as Nurse Jenny
- Joann Fields as Linda Randall
- Nicole Hutchenson as Sandi
- Amanda Arnold as Patricia
- LeMarc Johnson as Wally
- Aaron Alexander as Ed Randall
- Grayce Benesh as Rhoxxie
- Mysteria Black as Luscious
- Salvador Perez as Mike the Bouncer
- Andrew Henczak as Fred Jacobs
- Alexa Hanse as Rita
- Craig Welborn as Cage
- Bryan Modzelewski as Strip Club DJ
- Conor Nobles as Doug Baggins
- Caitlyn Hutson as Ginger
- Debbie Day as Secretary
- Chad Sitzmann as Dr. Rocky Von Stromboli III
- Dave Buckman as Pete Finn
- Trey Huguley as Isaac
- Marcelo Beduschi as Andre the Bouncer

== Production ==
The idea for Cherry Bomb began in late 2008 as a collaboration between writer Garrett Hargrove and director Kyle Day. Intended for independent production, the film underwent an extensive pre-production stage which involved many changes involving cast, crew, and union status, which subsequently caused several delays.

Principal photography began on March 2, 2010, and wrapped March 28, 2010. The majority of the film was shot on the Canon 7D, with additional footage shot on the Panasonic HVX200. All locations used were in Austin and surrounding areas.

On April 30, 2010, the first official trailer was released on the Cherry Bomb website via YouTube and garnered overwhelmingly positive responses, largely due to social networking via the Cherry Bomb Facebook page and industry blogs such as Geek Tyrant, Dread Central, and Trailer Addict.

== Release ==
Cherry Bomb premiered at the Portland Underground Film Festival on June 11, 2011.

== Awards ==
- Portland Underground Film Festival – Official Selection
- Splatterfest – Official Selection
