= Camp Fear (film) =

- DVD cover
- Directed by: Thom Edward Keith
- Written by: Thom Edward Keith
- Starring: Betsy Russell; Vincent Van Patten; Peggy Sands
- Cinematography: Gary Graver
- Distributed by: Retromedia Entertainment
- Release date: 1991
- Running time: 86 minutes
- Country: United States
- Language: English

Camp Fear (also known as The Millennium Countdown) is a 1991 direct-to-video science fiction/horror film starring Betsy Russell and Vincent Van Patten.

== Cast ==
- Vincent Van Patten as Professor Hamilton
- Betsy Russell as Jamie
- Peggy Sands as Tiffany
- Mike Diamant as "Frog"
- George Buck Flower as Wino
- Tiny Ron Taylor as The Druid
- David Homb as Bill
- James Kratt as "Ace"
- Nels Van Patten as "Speedy"
- Sherman Augustus as Dancer #1
- Michelle Bauer as Dorm Girl
- Shannon Wilsey as Dorm Girl
