= Holly Sampson =

American pornographic actress (born 1973)

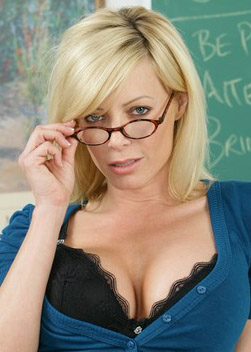
- Sampson in 2009
- Born: 1972 or 1973 (age 52–53)
- Occupations: Actress; model

Holly Sampson (born 1972 or 1973), is an American actress and model who has appeared in both mainstream and pornographic films.

== Personal life ==
In December 2009, Sampson was one of several women linked to professional golfer Tiger Woods's marital infidelities. She claimed on a video appearing on adult website NaughtyAmerica that she had sex with him at his bachelor party. She later stated that she did not have a sexual relationship with Woods while he was married.

== See also ==
- List of pornographic film actors who have appeared in mainstream films
