= The World's Biggest Gang Bang III – The Houston 620 =

1999 gang bang

- DVD cover
- Presented by: Ron Jeremy
- Starring: Houston
- Country of origin: United States

Original release
- Release: 6 February 1999

The World's Biggest Gang Bang III – The Houston 620 is a 1999 pornographic film directed by Greg Alves. The film is hosted by Ron Jeremy, and stars Houston in a gang bang format, who set out to beat the then-record for most sex in one day. Houston beat a record of 551 by Spontaneous Xtasy and was beaten later that year by Candy Apples with 742. The film won the 2000 AVN Award for being the "Top Selling Release of the Year" of 1999.

== History ==
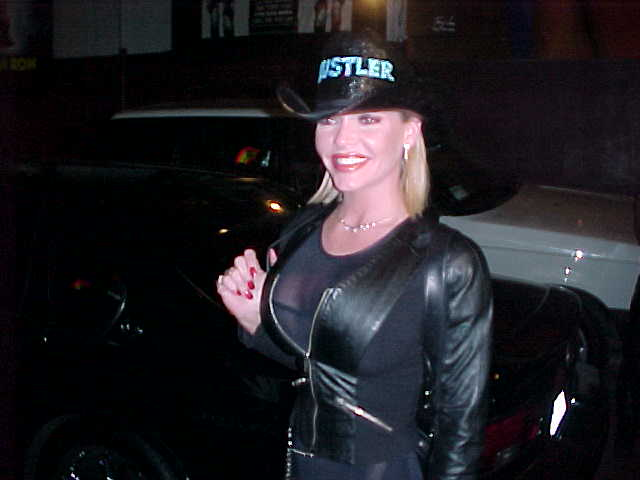
Houston in 1999

By 1998, John T. Bone had directed World's Biggest Gang Bang (1995) and World's Biggest Gang Bang II (1996). That year, he met Houston, a porn star who had appeared in Baywatch and had taken 1997 out to tour as a feature dancer, and suggested that Houston could use a similar stunt as a comeback vehicle. Houston suggested the idea to Metro, a porn company who owned the rights to the first two World's Biggest films, who responded with agreement and a marketing campaign.

The event took place on February 6, 1999. Houston stated in a press conference that the event was "not about sex" but "just a freak show". The film was broadcast live, though 4,000 people trying to log on at once crashed the server and a rebroadcast was scheduled for February 13. At the time of the event, the gangbang record was 551 and was held by Spontaneous Xtasy. The Houston 500, as it was initially known, was presented by Ron Jeremy and directed by Greg Alves. Filming took place in a soundstage in Canoga Park, Los Angeles. The participants, who had travelled from all over North America included Misty Rain and Jeremy himself, who had previously declined to take part. Camera crews were present from Metro, the Playboy Channel, and for French TV, and ten fluffers including Laurie Holmes were hired to maintain erections. Counting was perfunctory, with the rolling counter behind the set rising by twos and fours. Houston went for lunch at "300", was awarded a two-tiered, black-and-silver trophy at "500", and raised the target to 600 and then to 620 as she felt bad for those who were waiting.

Shortly after filming, she underwent a labiaplasty and said she would auction off the remnants. She stated in August 2000 that she had enjoyed the day as she "was able to be with my fans and have the same personality all day long for ten hours and get fucked". Her 620 total was beaten in October 1999 by Candy Apples, who had sex 742 times. The film won the 2000 AVN Award for being the "Top Selling Release of the Year" of 1999.
