= Shock and Awe (disambiguation) =

Shock and awe is a military doctrine based on the use of overwhelming power, dominant battlefield awareness, overpowering maneuvers, and spectacular displays of force to paralyze an adversary's perception of the battlefield and destroy its will to fight.

Shock and Awe may also refer to:

- Shock and Awe Campaign, the initial bombing campaign of the 2003 invasion of Iraq
- Shock and Awe (album), a 2003 album by stand-up comedian Bill Hicks
- Shock and Awe (film), a 2017 American drama film
- "Shockandawe", a 2017 single by Miguel
- Shock and Awe: The Story of Electricity, a 2011 British documentary TV series
- "Shock and Awe", the tenth campaign mission of Call of Duty 4: Modern Warfare.
- Shock & Awe, short lived XWF tag team of Harry Del Rios (Shock) and Ian Harriosn (Awe)
