= List of former Total Nonstop Action Wrestling personnel (D–H) =

Total Nonstop Action Wrestling is a professional wrestling company based in Nashville, Tennessee. Former employees (family name letters D–H) in TNA consist of professional wrestlers, managers, play-by-play and color commentators, announcers, interviewers, referees, trainers, script writers, executives, and board of directors. In the case of wrestlers originating from Spanish-speaking countries, who most often have two surnames, the paternal (first) surname is used.

TNA talent contracts range from developmental contracts to multi-year deals. They primarily appeared on TNA television programming, pay-per-views, monthly specials, and live events, and talent with developmental contracts appeared at Border City Wrestling and Ohio Valley Wrestling. When talent is released of their contract, it could be for a budget cut, the individual asking for their release, for personal reasons, time off from an injury, or retirement.

Those who made appearances without a contract and those who were previously released but are currently employed by TNA are not included.

== Alumni (D–H) ==
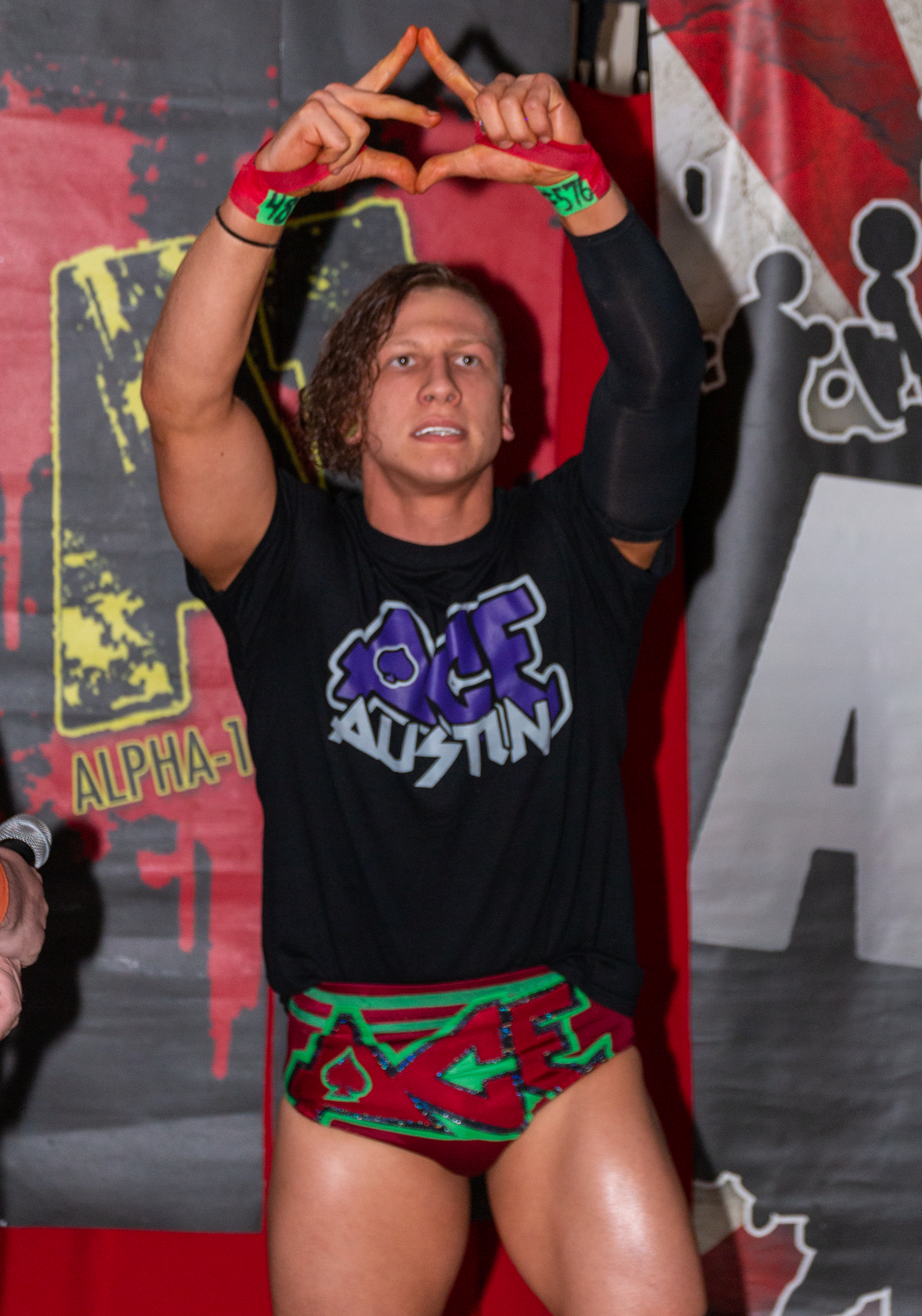
Ace Austin

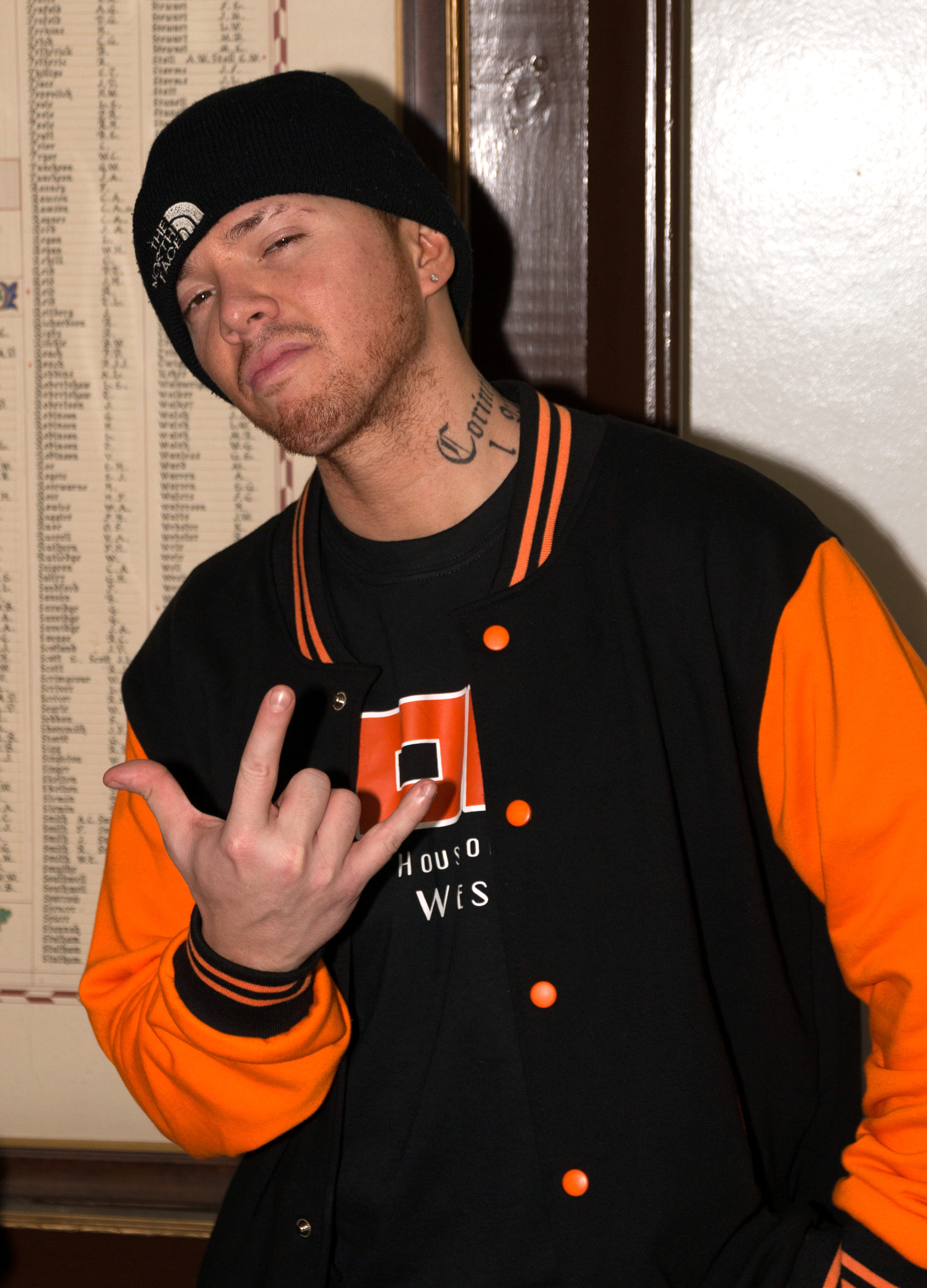
Amazing Red

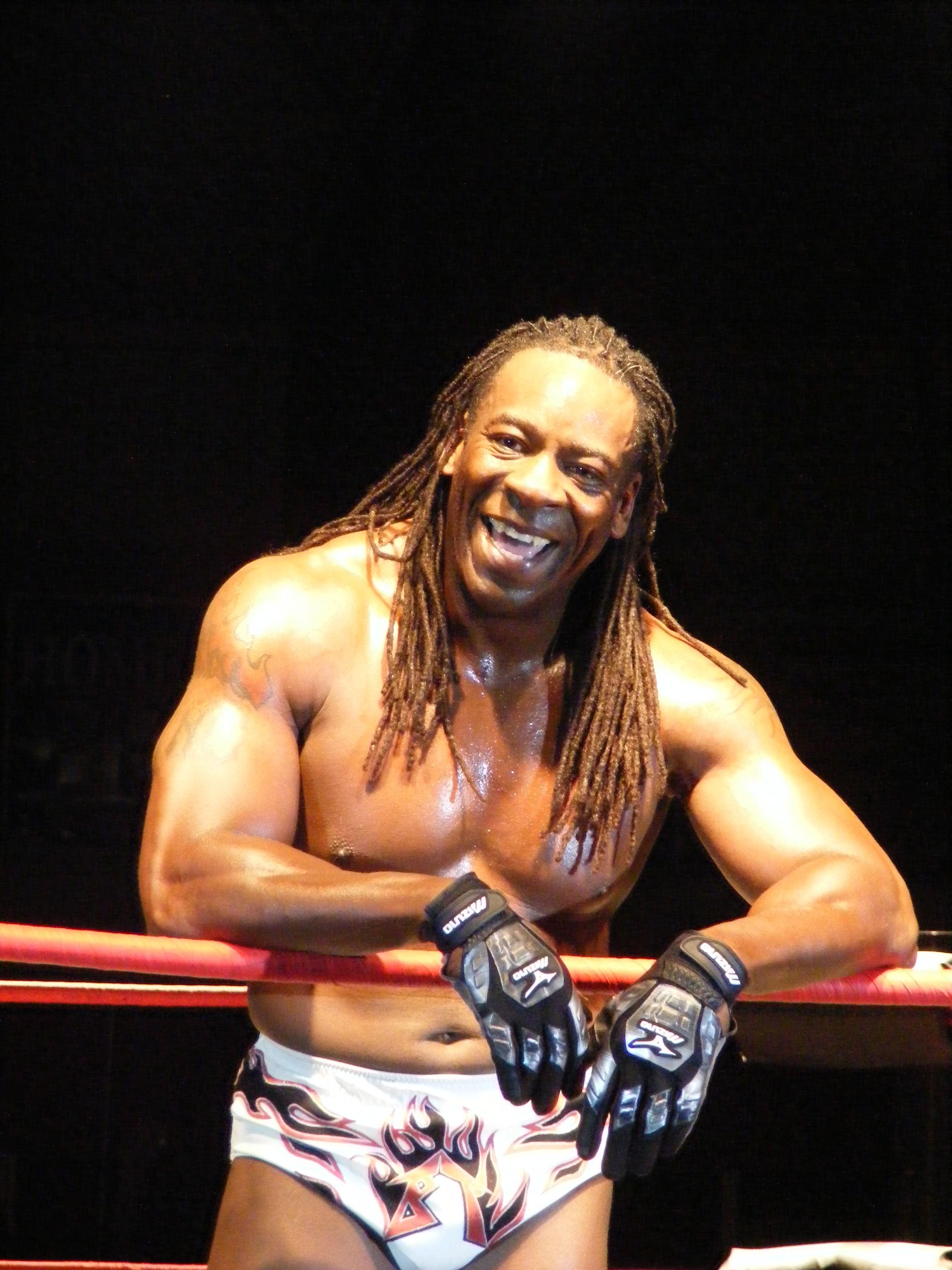
Booker T

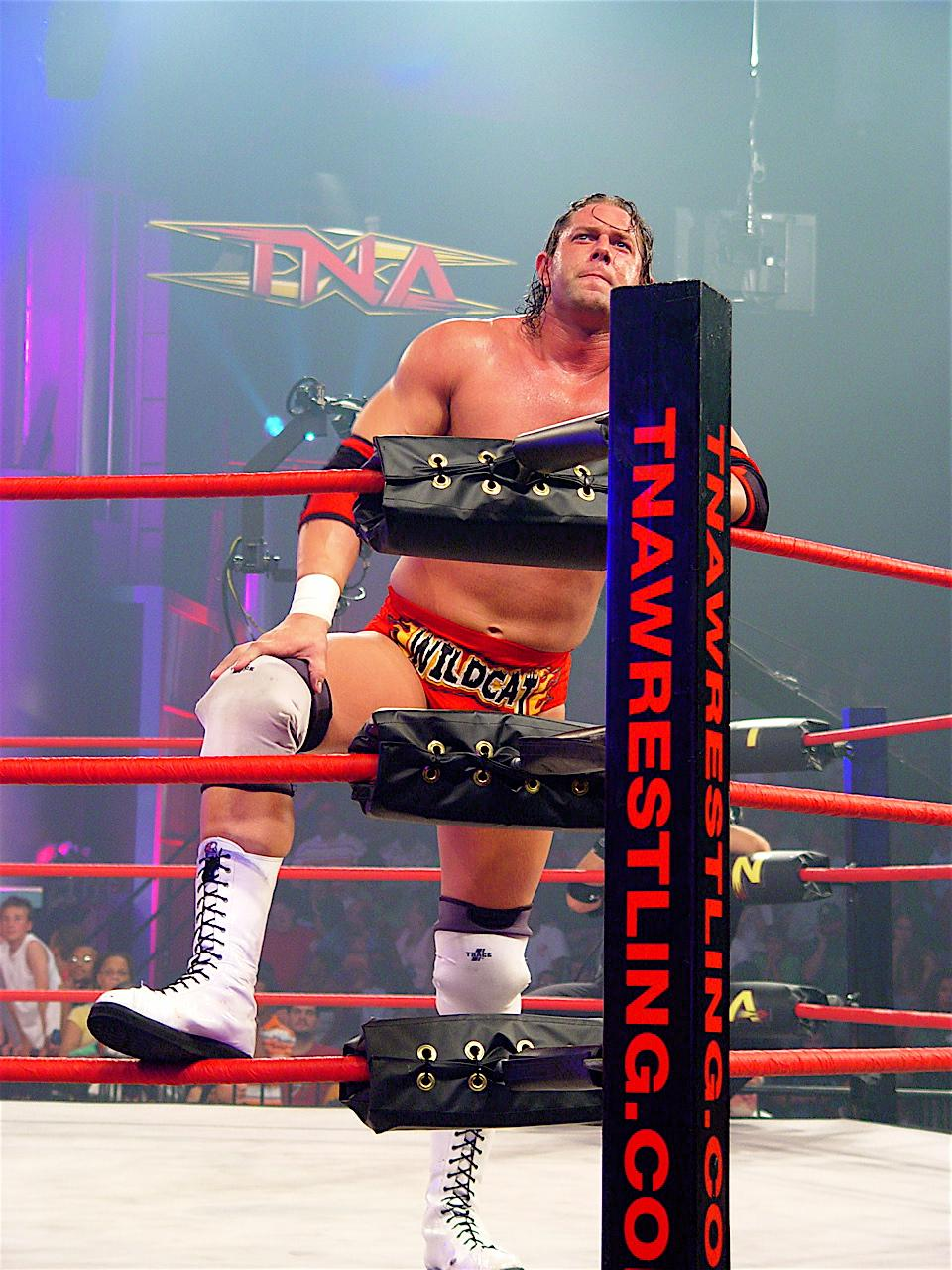
Chris Harris

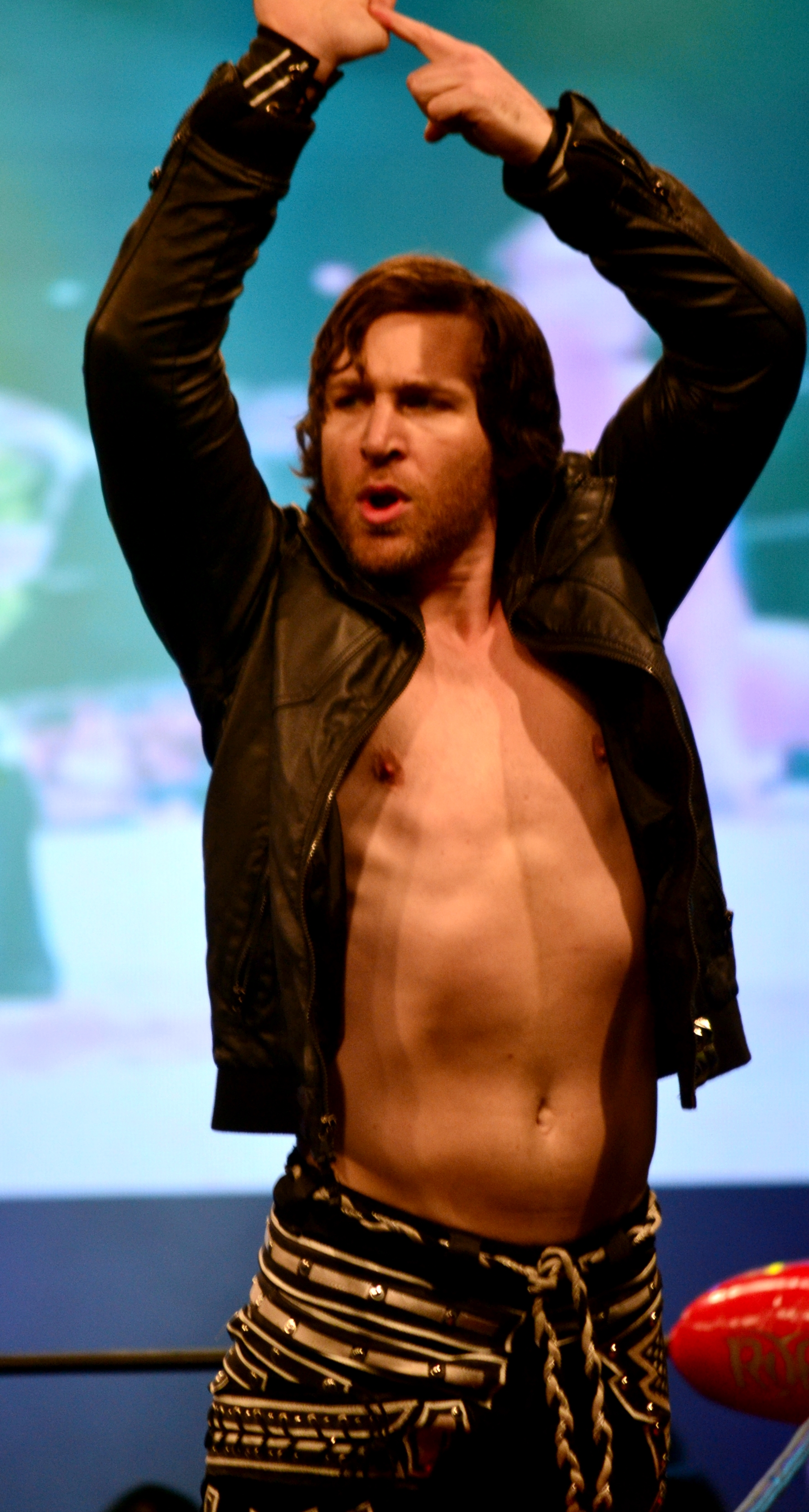
Chris Sabin

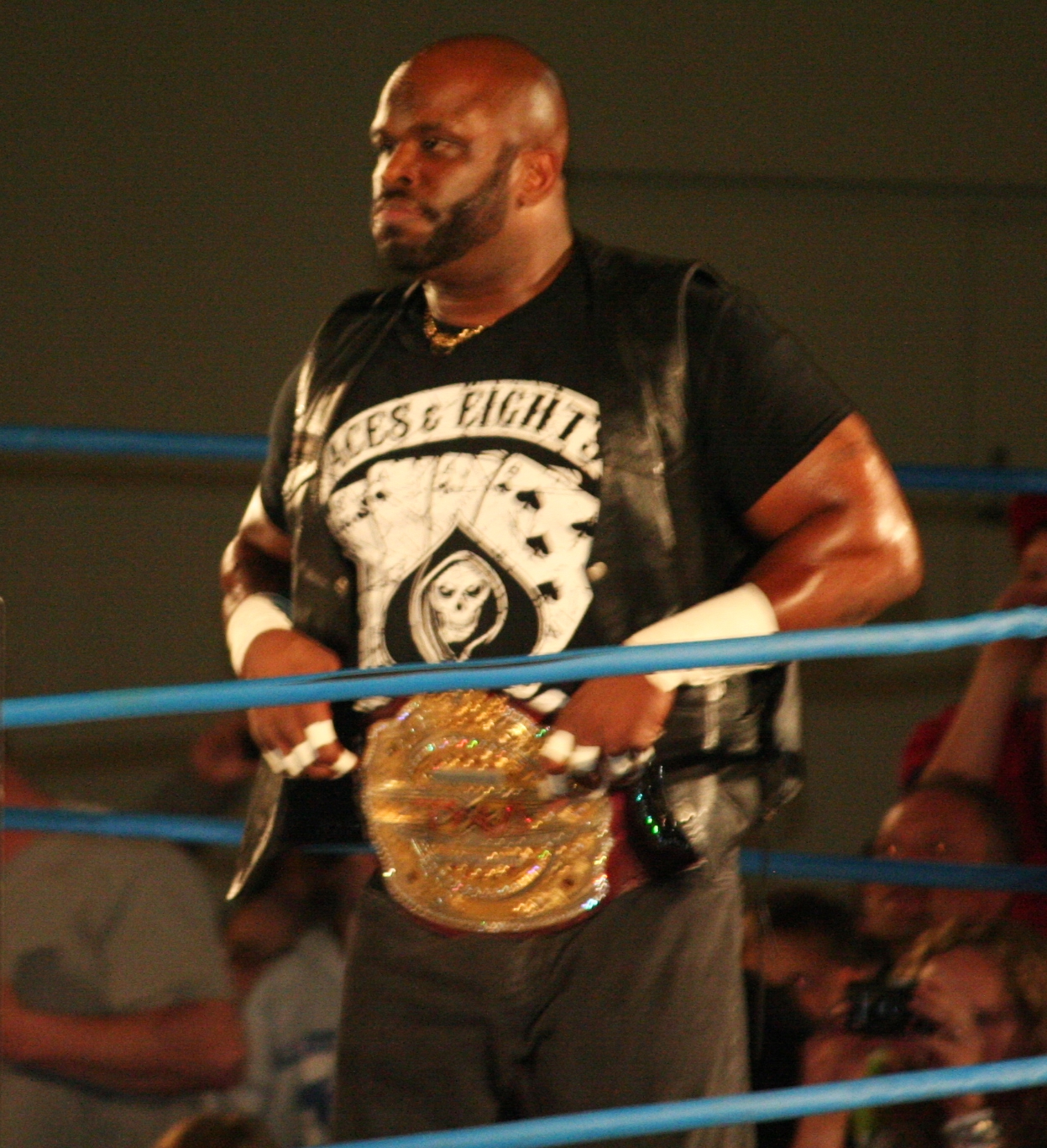
Devon

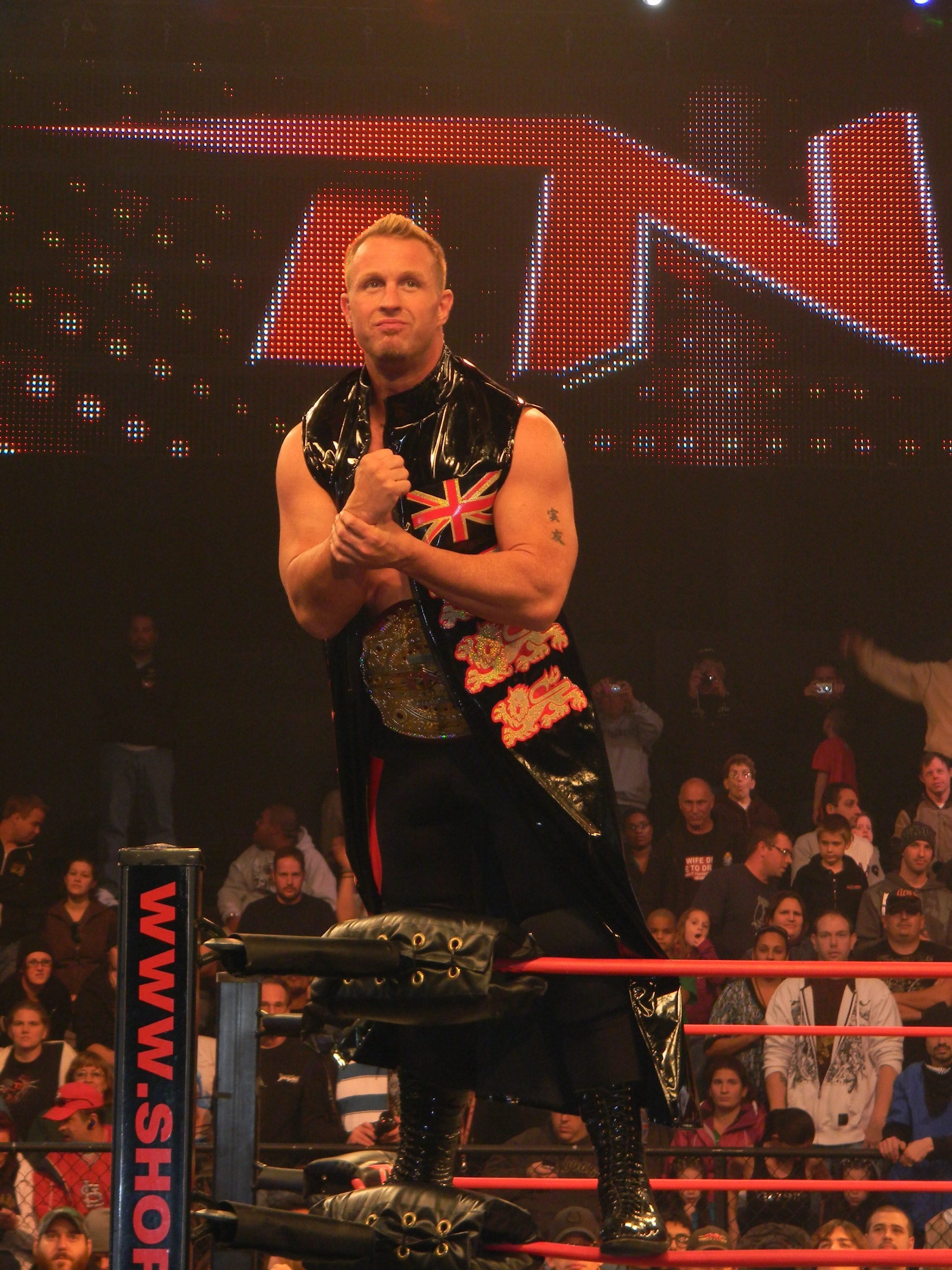
Doug Williams

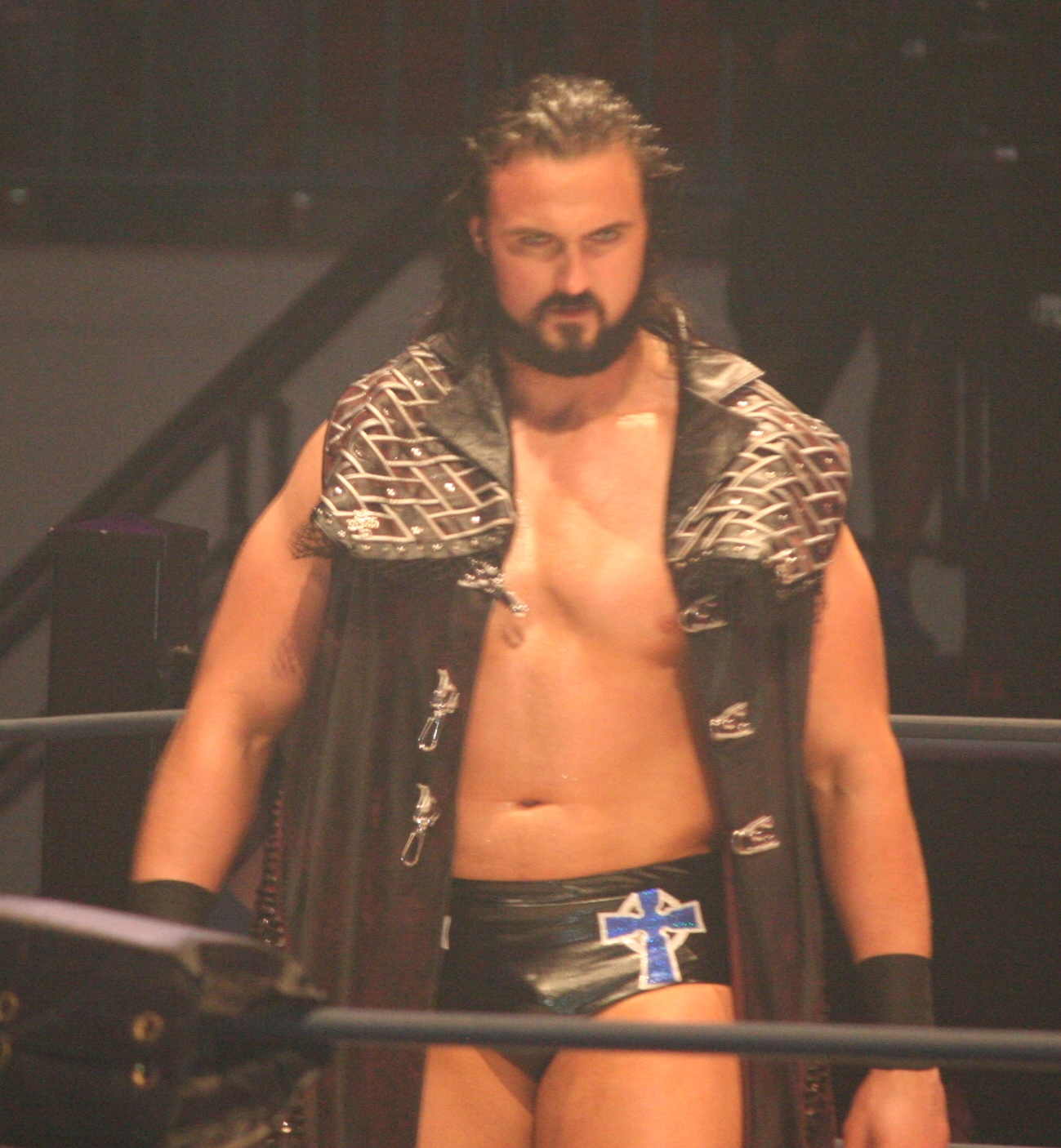
Drew Galloway

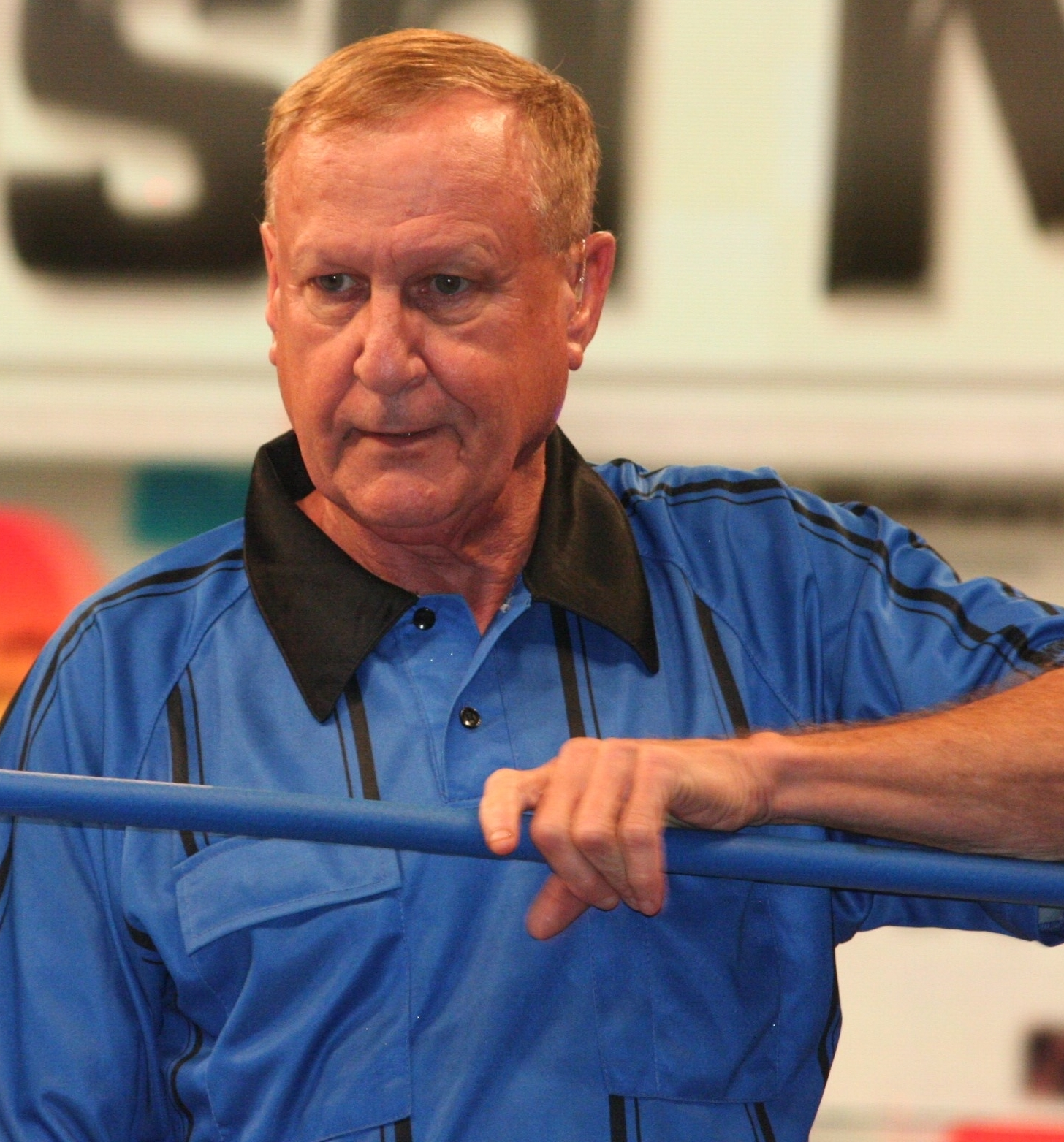
Earl Hebner

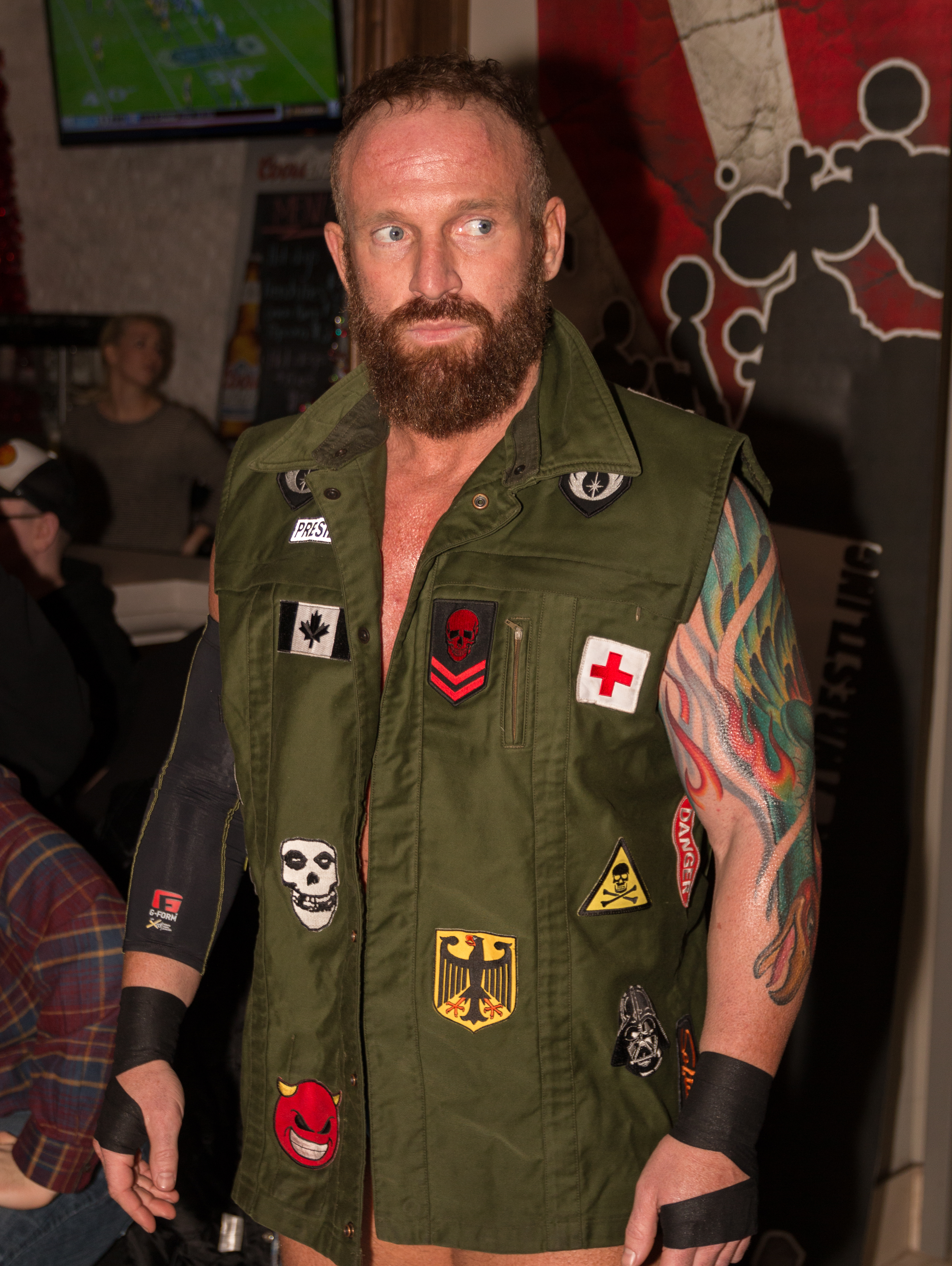
Eric Young

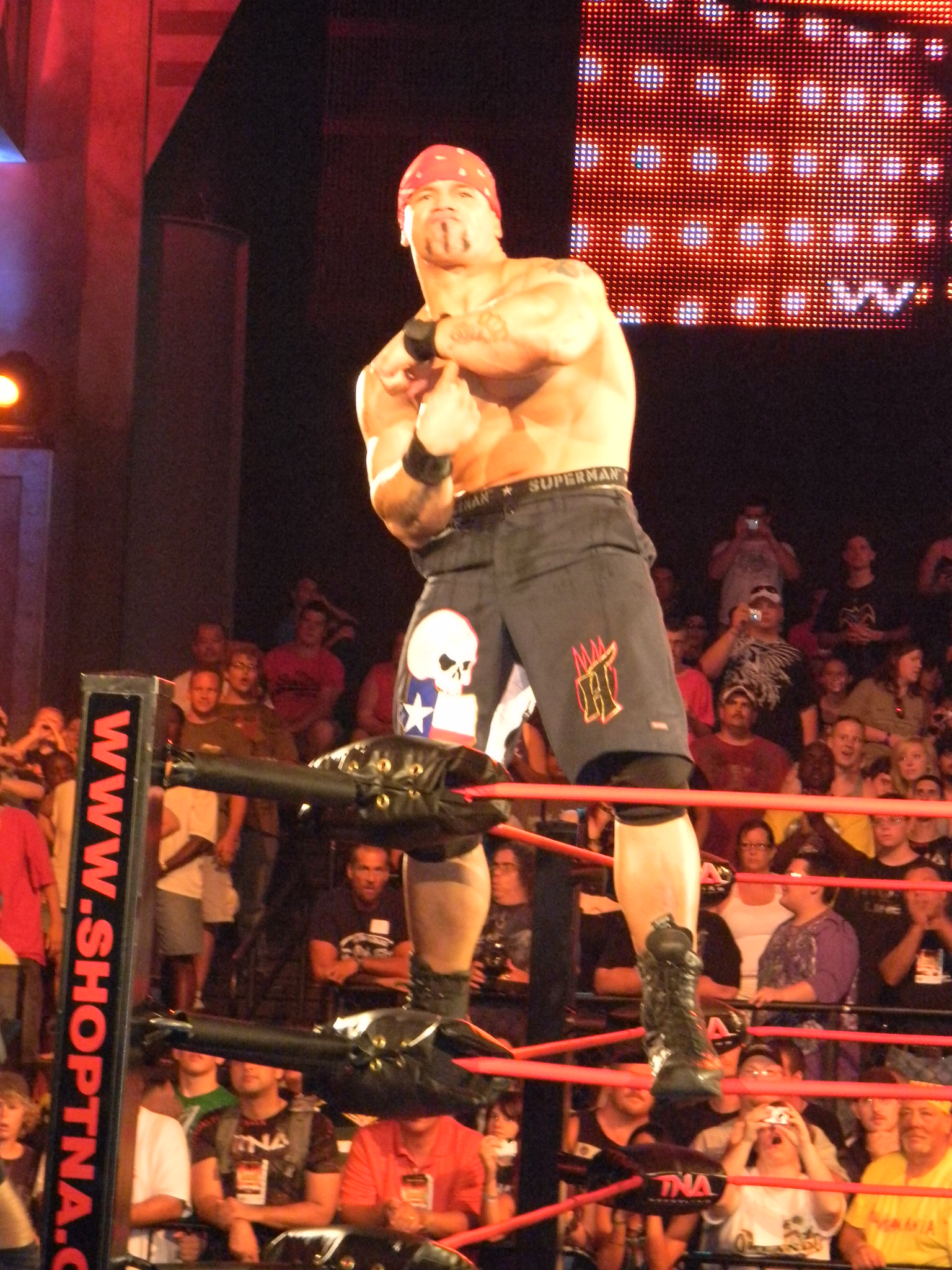
Hernandez

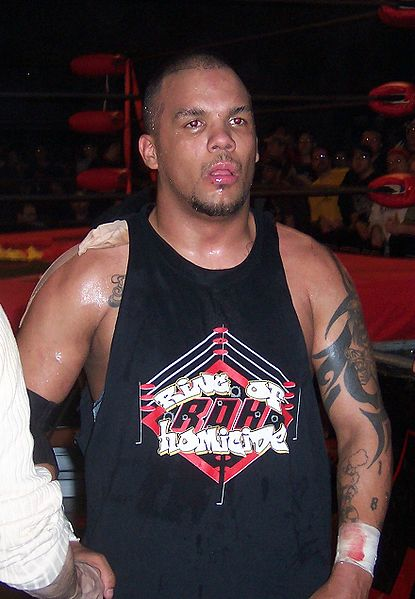
Homicide

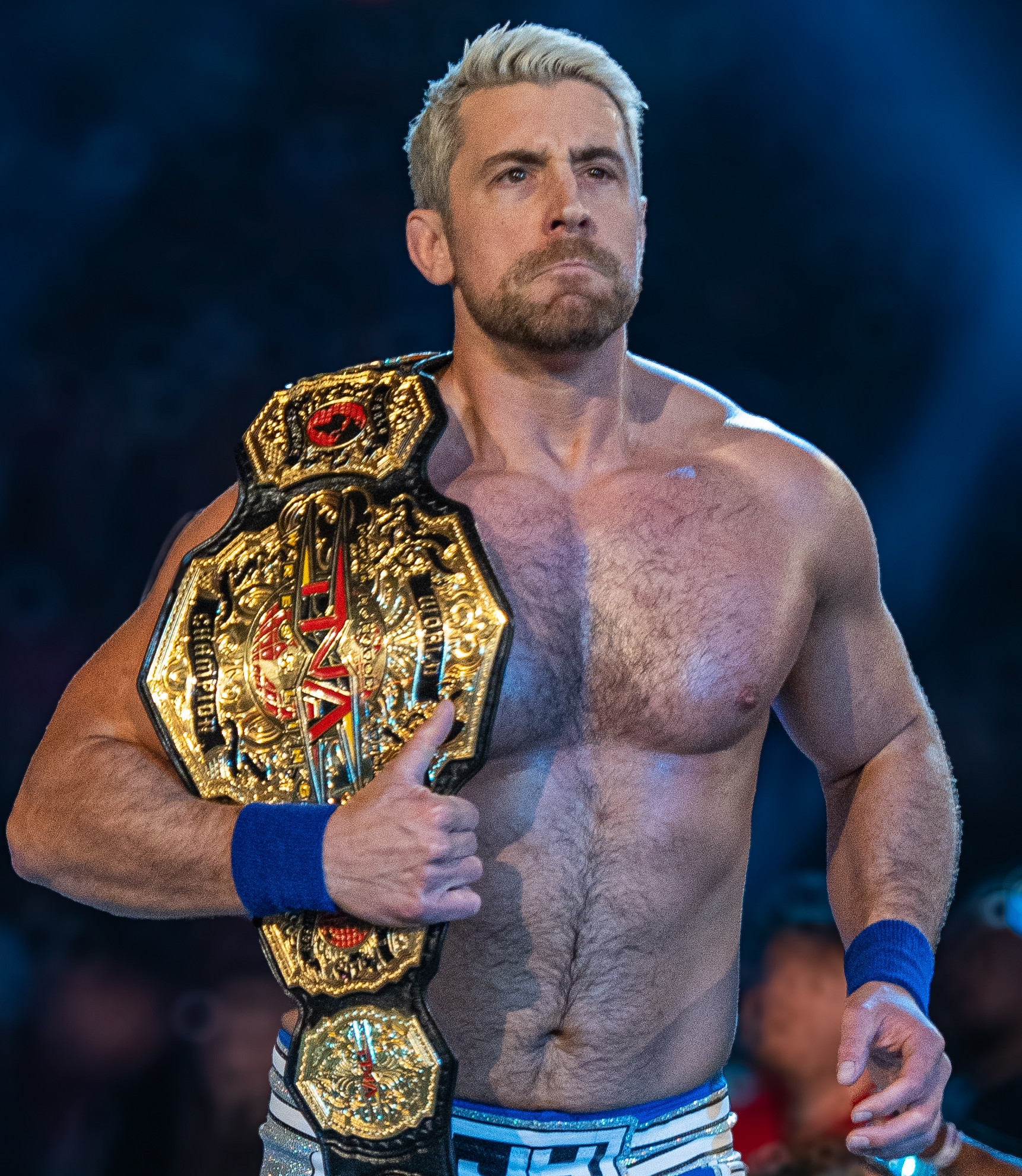
Joe Hendry

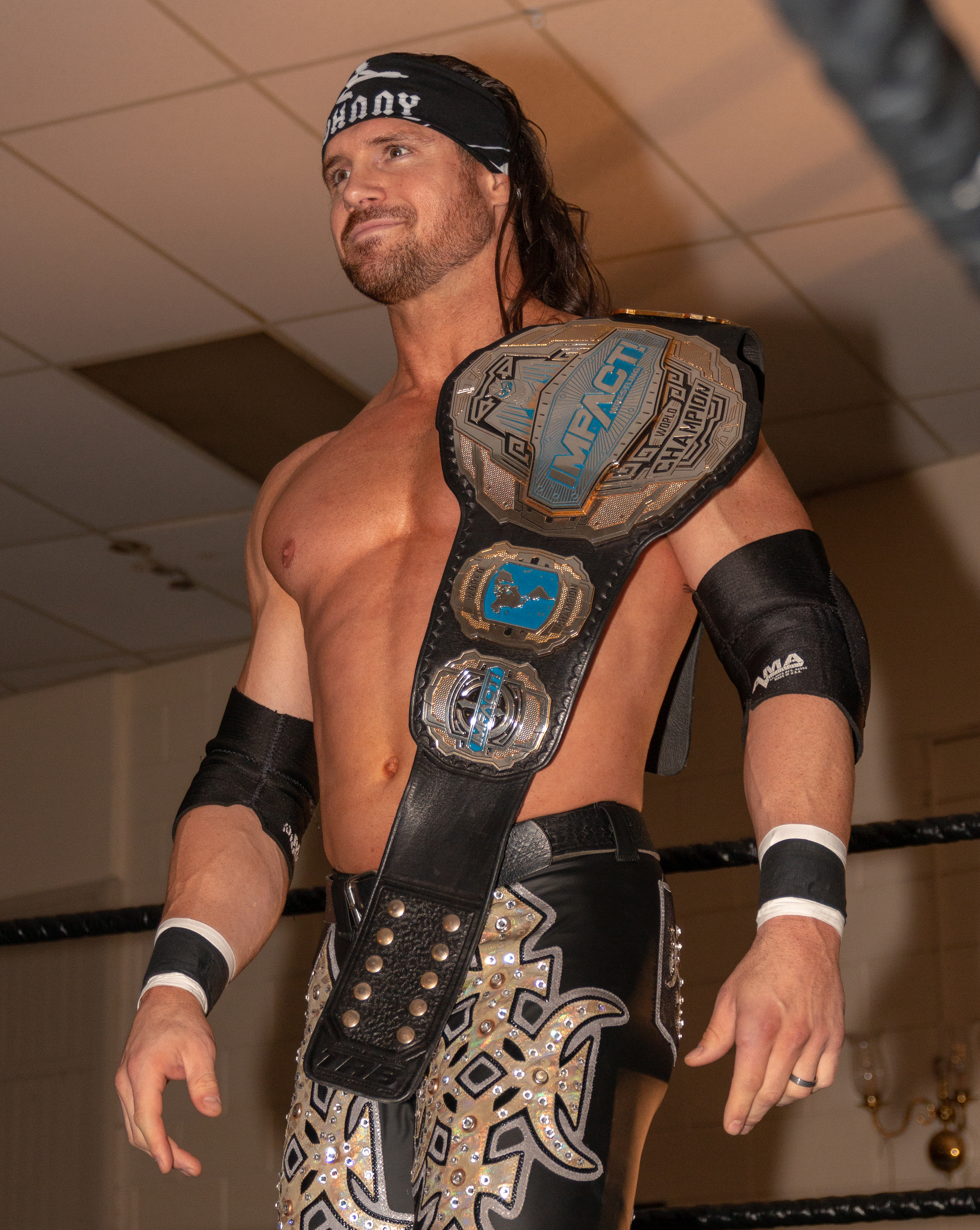
Johnny Impact

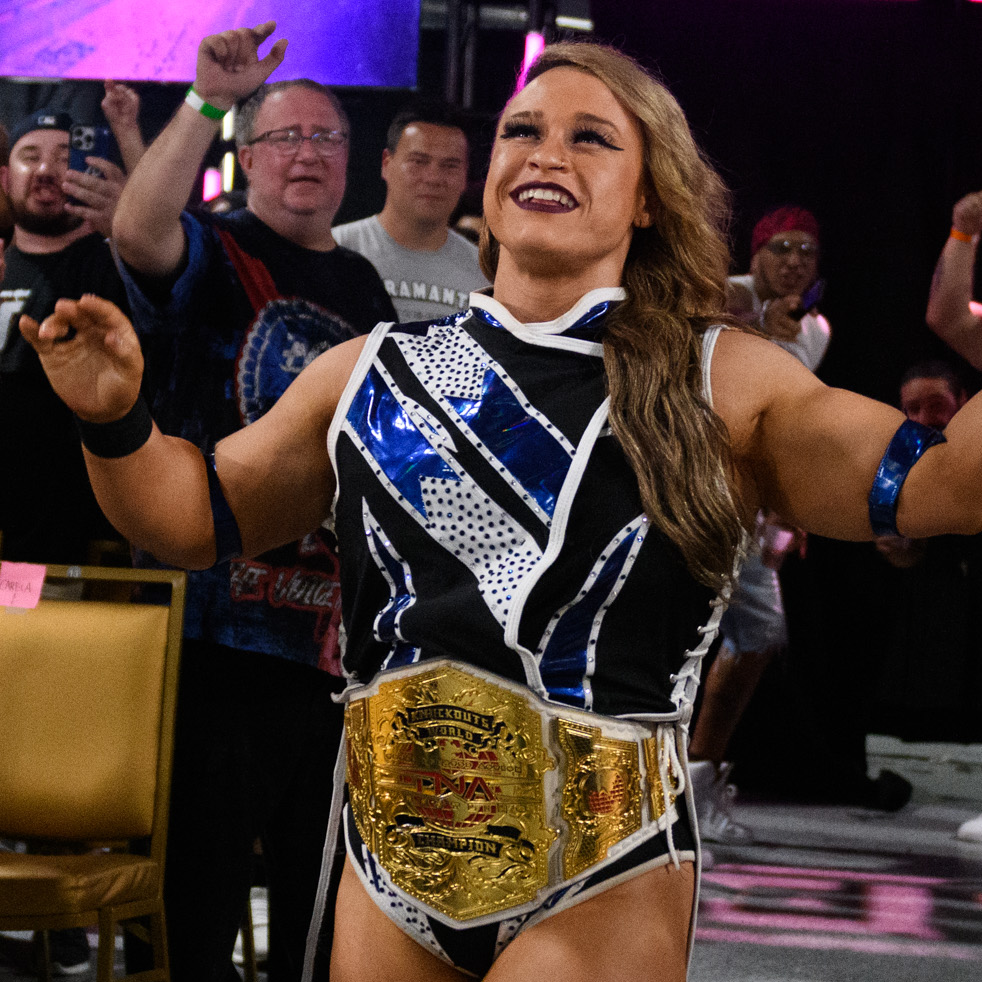
Jordynne Grace

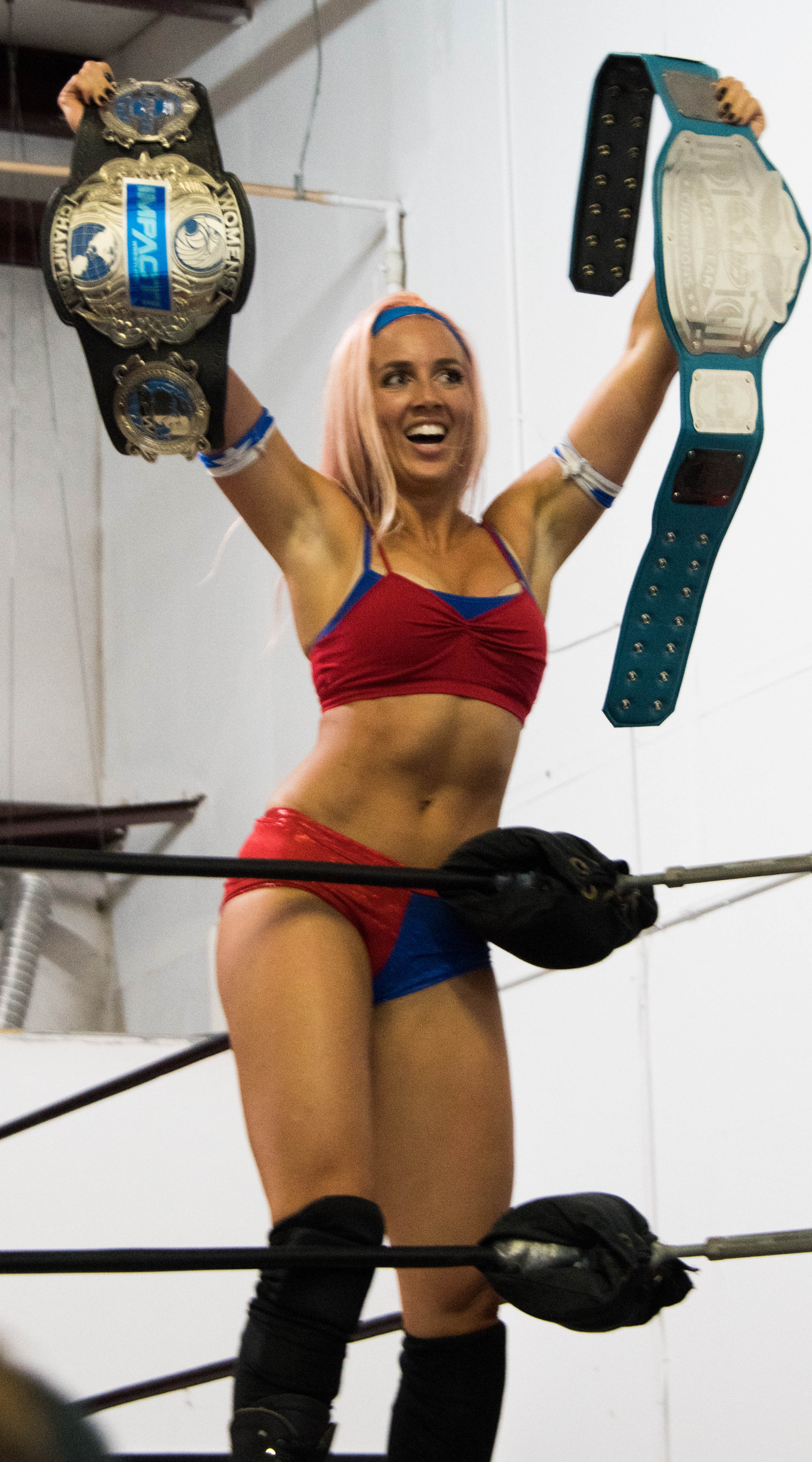
Laurel Van Ness

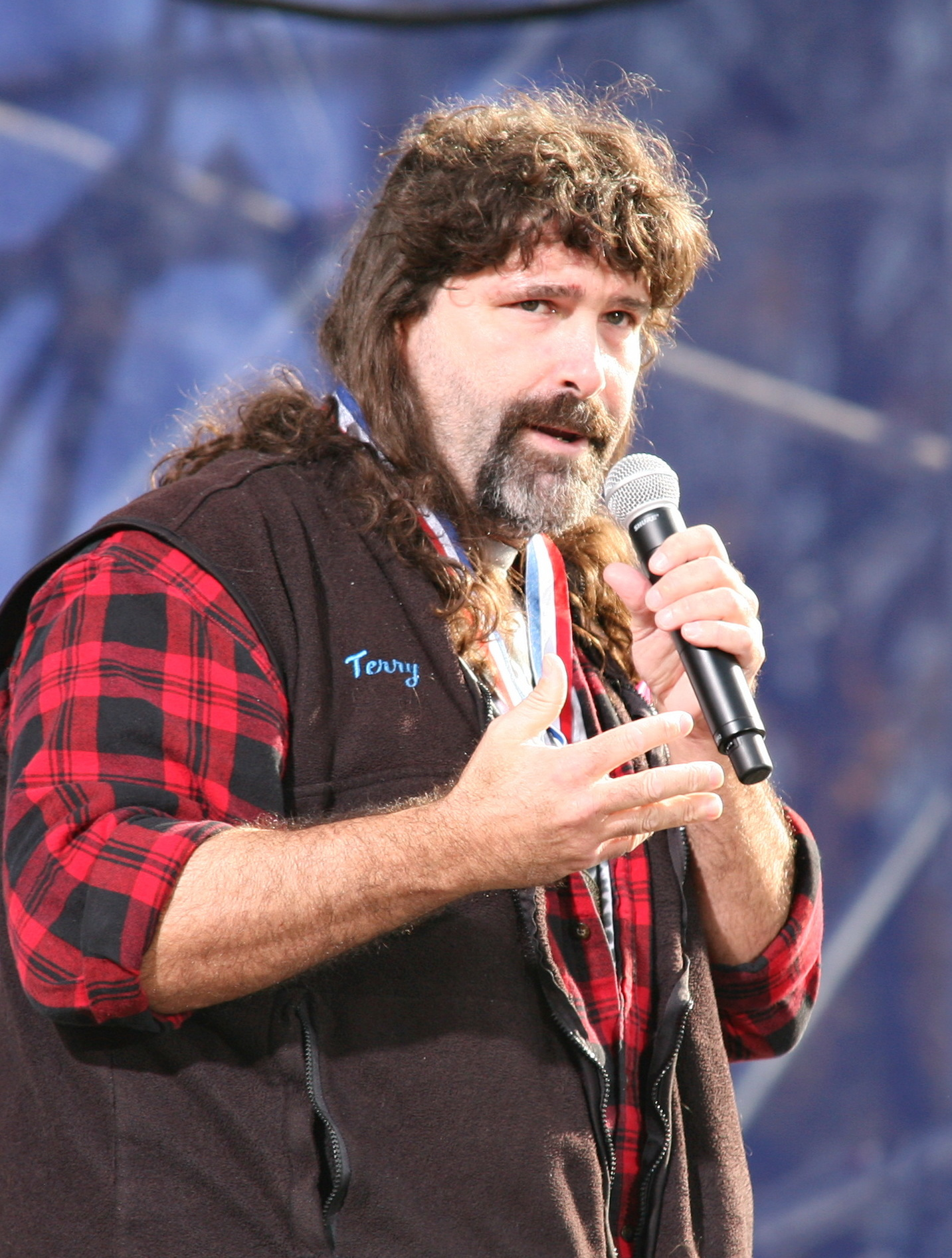
Mick Foley

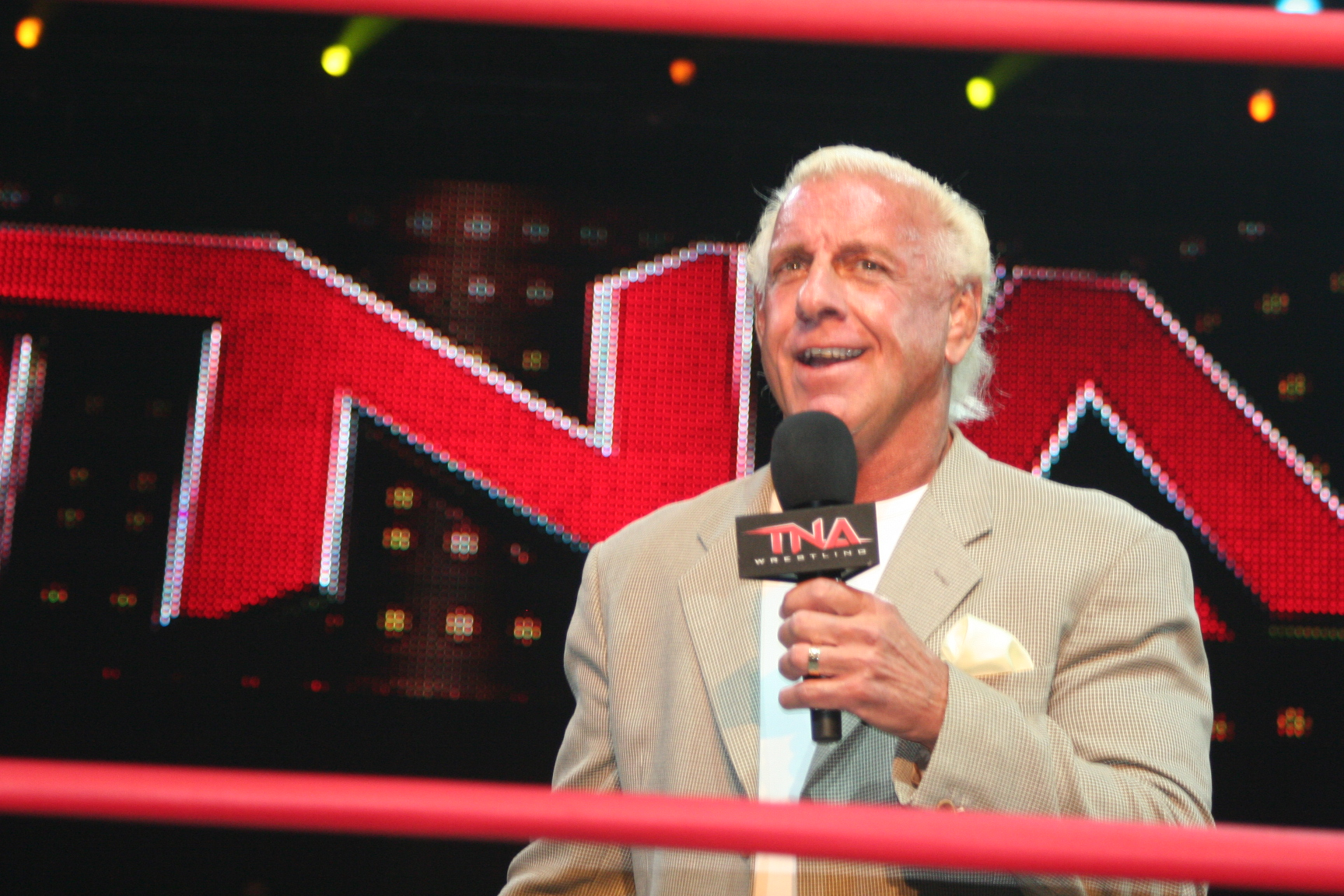
Ric Flair

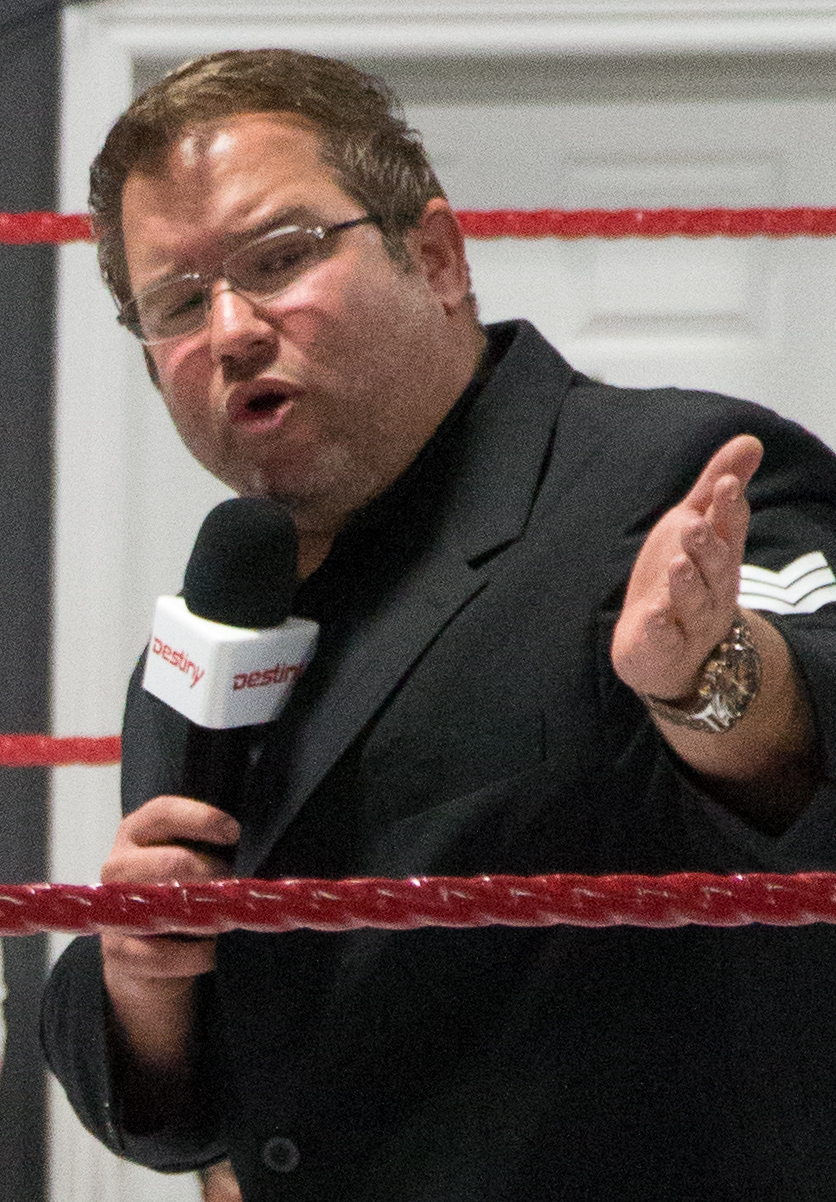
Scott D'Amore

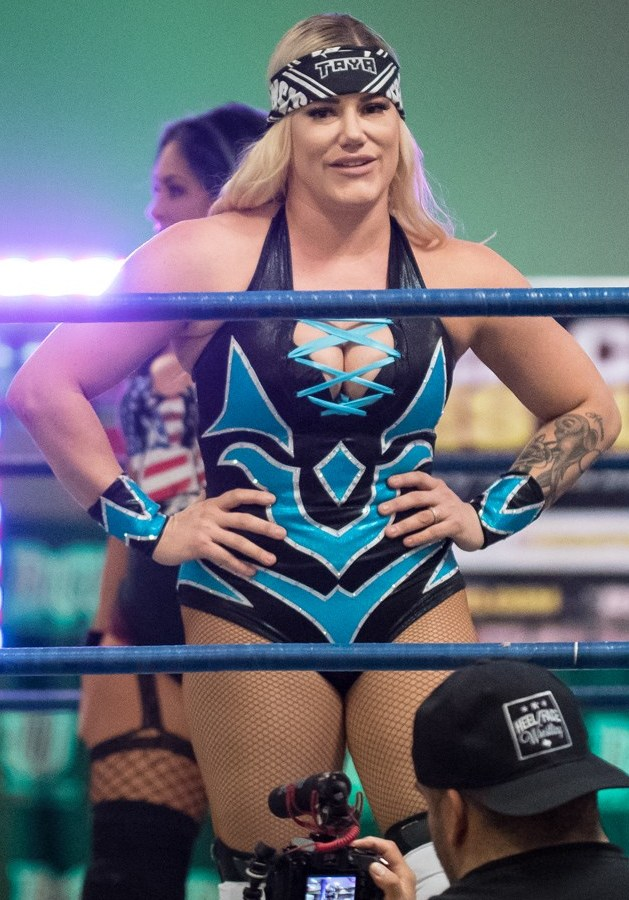
Taya Valkyrie

Birth name	Ring name (s)	Tenure	Ref
Unknown	Simply Delicious	2003	
Unknown	Vic Devine	2003	
Unknown	Two Face	2003	
Unknown	Katie Forbes	2019–2020	
Unknown	Rory Fox	2003	
Unknown	Scott Fowler	2004	
Unknown	Stu Gots	2006	
Unknown	Sal E. Graziano	2010	
Unknown	T.J. Grey	2002	
Unknown	Tina Hamilton	2002	
Unknown	T.J. Harley	2004	
Unknown	Maid of Honor	2008	
Scott D'Amore	Coach D'Amore; Scott D'Amore	2003–2010; 2017–2024	
Jon Dalton	Jonny Fairplay	2004–2005	
Johnny Damon	Johnny Damon	2005	
Jackson Dane †	Wilcox; Jax Dane	2017–2019	
Dakota Darsow	Dakota Darsow	2011; 2012	
Tenille Dashwood	Tenille Dashwood	2019–2022	
Jaime Dauncey	Sirelda	2004; 2005; 2006	
Jonathan Davis II	Axis	2003	
Kimberly Davis	Amber O'Neal	2006; 2008; 2009	
Marcus Davis	Marcus Davis	2008	
Michael Davis	Michael Davis	2009	
Candice Dawson	Candice Larea	2013	
Stephanie Josephine De Landre	Steph De Lander	2023–2026	
Stephen DeAngelis	Stephen DeAngelis	2010	
Chace Dee	Big Fat Oily Guy	2007	
Serena Deeb	Serena Deeb	2008; 2013; 2015	
Seth Delay	Seth Delay	2003; 2004	
Jason DellaGatta	Jason Rumble	2003–2004	
Harry Del Rios	Del Rios	2002	
Michael DePoli	Roadkill	2003	
Rhea DeVlugt	Jasmine St. Claire	2002	
John DeVine	Horace The Psychopath	2003	
Caleb Dewall	Silas Young	2004	
Dustin Diamond †	Dustin Diamond	2002	
Catherine Dingman	Taylor Vaughn	2002	
Joshua Diogo	J.D. Escalade	2004	
Ed Divorsky	Ed Divorsky	2006	
Brigham Doane	Masada	2003; 2004	
Kenneth Doane	Ken Phoenix; Kid Phoenix; Kenn Doane	2003; 2004; 2010	
Naruki Doi	Naruki Doi	2008	
Andy Douglas	Andy Douglas	2003; 2004–2007	
Jacob Doyle	Jake Holmes; Jake Deaner; Cousin Jake; Jake Something	2017; 2018–2022; 2023–2025	
Seini Draughn	Lei'D Tapa	2013–2014	
James Duggan Jr.	Jim Duggan	2003	
MaryKate Duignan	Miss Betsy; Rosie Lottalove; Rosie	2010	
Douglas Durdle	Doug Williams; Douglas Williams	2008; 2010–2013; 2014	
Robert Eaton †	Bobby Eaton	2003	
David Eckstein	David Eckstein	2007	
Adrian Ede	Jayson Cyprus	2011	
Rachael Ellering	Rachael Ellering	2021–2022	
Elvis Elliot	Helvis; Elvis Elliot; Hellvis	2003–2005	
Jason Elliot	Jason Riggs	2007	
John Elliot	Johnny Riggs	2007	
Tony Elliot	Teo	2002	
Daniel Engler	Rudy Charles	2002–2009	
Nelson Erazo	Homicide	2005–2010; 2013–2015; 2017–2018	
Rob Etchaverria	Rob Fuego; El Fuego	2002; 2004	
Robert Evans	R.D. Evans	2019–2024	
Henry Faggart †	Jackie Fargo	2002	
Page Falkinburg	Diamond Dallas Page	2004–2005	
Edward Fatu †	Ekmo Fatu; Ekmo; Jamal	2003–2004	
Solofa Fatu Jr.	Junior Fatu	2007	
Trinity Fatu	Trinity	2023–2024	
Steve Favata	Steve Madison	2003	
Edward Ferrara	Ed Ferrara	2002; 2009–2010	
Louis Ferringo	Lou Ferrigno	2009	
Kevin Fertig	Serpent	2009	
Tevita Fifita	Micah; Tanga Loa	2015; 2022	
Germán Figueroa	Gran Apolo; Apolo; El Leon	2002; 2004; 2005–2006; 2007	
Jonathan Figueroa	Amazing Red; Sangriento	2002–2005; 2009–2011	
John Finegan	John Finegan	2010	
Stephanie Finochio	Trinity; The Mystery Luchador	2003–2005; 2013	
Robert Fish	Bobby Fish	2010; 2022	
Jerome Fleisch	Jody Fleisch	2006	
David Fliehr	David Flair	2002–2003	
Richard Fliehr (Note: Ric Flair's birth name is unknown. He was adopted in infancy through the scandal-ridden Tennessee Children's Home Society, and was named Richard Fliehr by his adoptive parents.)	Ric Flair	2010–2012	
Francis Flores	Fallah Bahh	2017–2022	
Michael Foley	Mick Foley	2008–2011	
Christopher Ford	Tempest; Devon Storm	2002; 2013	
Kira Forster	Taya Valkyrie	2017–2021; 2022–2023	
Francine Fournier	Francine	2002	
Kimberly Frankele	Kimber Lee	2020–2022	
Nelson Frazier Jr. †	Nelson Knight	2003	
Rachel Freeman	Savannah Evans	2021–2025	
Alexander Freitas	Alex Silva	2011; 2012–2013	
Jeremy Fritz	Eric Young	2004–2016; 2020–2022; 2023–2026	
Paul Fuchs †	Paul E. Normous	2004	
James Fullington	The Sandman	2002–2003; 2004; 2010	
Shoichi Funaki	Funaki	2013	
Allan Funk	Bruce; Queen Bruce	2002	
Dorrance Funk Jr. †	Dory Funk, Jr.	2002; 2006; 2010	
Terrence Funk †	Terry Funk	2004–2005; 2009	
Marie Gabert	Alpha Female	2014	
Andrew Galloway IV	Drew Galloway	2015–2017	
Brian Gamble	Brian Gamble	2003; 2004	
John Gargano	Johnny Gargano	2009	
Jamara Garrett	Mara Sadè	2025–2026	
Santana Garrett	Brittany; Santana Garrett	2010; 2013–2014	
Jacquelyn Gayda	Jackie Gayda	2005–2007	
Joel Gertner	Joel Gertner	2002; 2010	
Reuben Gibson	Robert Gibson	2002–2003	
Glenn Gilbertti	Disco Inferno; Glenn Gilbertti	2002–2004; 2007–2008; 2011; 2018; 2019; 2020	
Jessie Godderz	Jessie Godderz	2011–2017	
Eduardo González	Juventud Guerrera; Juvi	2002–2003; 2004; 2023	
Armando Gorbea	El Diablo	2005	
Terry Gordy Jr.	Ray Gordy	2004	
Hirooki Goto	Hirooki Goto	2006	
Zachary Gowen	Tenacious Z Zach Gowen	2003; 2004; 2005; 2006	
Jenna Grattan	Portia Perez	2008	
Chelsea Green	Chelsea Green; Laurel Van Ness	2016–2018; 2021–2022	
Zachary Green	Suicide; Wentz; Zachary Wentz	2018–2020; 2023–2026	
Sylvain Grenier	Sylvain Grenier	2007–2008; 2009	
Patricia Gresham	Jordynne Grace	2018–2025	
Nidia Guenard	Nidia	2005	
Héctor Guerrero	Héctor Guerrero	2007–2015	
Salvador Guerrero IV	Chavo Guerrero Jr. Chavo Guerrero	2012–2013	
James Guffey †	Jimmy Rave	2002–2004; 2007–2009; 2011; 2013	
Jesse Guilmette	Braxton Sutter	2015–2018	
José Gutiérrez	Último Guerrero	2008	
Jody Gyivicsan	Jody Threat	2023–2026	
Charles Doyle Haas II	Charlie Haas	2022	
Aaron Haddad	Aron Rex	2016–2017	
Jermaine Haley	Jonah	2021–2022	
Jillian Hall	Jillian Hall	2012; 2013	
Scott Hall †	Scott Hall	2002; 2004–2005; 2007–2008; 2010	
Ayako Hamada	Hamada	2009–2010	
Jeff Hammond	Jeff Hammond	2003; 2004; 2005	
Christopher Hamrick	Crimson Dragon	2002	
Andrew Hankinson	D.O.C. Doc Gallows; Sex Ferguson	2012–2013; 2020–2022	
William Happer	Bo Dupp	2002	
Rebecca Hardy	Reby Sky; Reby Hardy; Rebecca Hardy	2014; 2015–2017; 2024	
Brian Harris	Brian Lee	2002–2003	
Chris Harris	Chris Harris	2002–2008; 2010; 2011; 2021; 2022	
James Harris †	Kamala	2008	
Ian Harrison	Ian Harrison	2002	
Jimmy Hart	Jimmy Hart	2003; 2005; 2010–2011	
Joshua Harter	Chris Sabin	2003–2014; 2019–2024	
Mark Haskins	Mark Haskins	2011–2012	
Steven Haworth	Desmond Wolfe	2009–2011	
Oren Hawxhurst	Altar Boy Luke	2003	
Trisa Hayes	Beulah McGillicutty	2010	
Lindsay Hayward	Isis the Amazon	2011	
Daizee Haze	Daisy Haze; Daizee Haze	2003–2004; 2008	
Brian Hebner	Brian Hebner	2006–2017	
Dave Hebner †	Dave Hebner	2005–2012	
Earl Hebner	Earl Hebner	2006–2017	
David Heath	Vampire Warrior	2002; 2003	
Raymond Heenan †	Bobby Heenan	2005; 2006; 2010	
Brian Heffron	The Blue Meanie	2002	
Michael Hegstrand †	Hawk	2002–2003	
Gregory Hemphill	Greg Hemphill	2011	
Joseph Samuel Hendry	Joe Hendry	2018–2019; 2022–2025	
Curtis Hennig †	Curt Hennig; Mr. Perfect	2002–2003	
John Hennigan	Johnny Impact	2017–2019	
Peter Hernandez	Norv Fernum	2013–2014; 2015	
Shawn Hernandez	Hernandez	2003–2004; 2006–2014; 2015; 2018; 2020–2022	
Mike Hettinga	Knux	2012–2015	
Austin Highley	Ace Austin	2019–2025	
Dorian Hill	D-Ray 3000; Don Crisis	2004–2005; 2006	
Rudy Hill	Rude Boy	2004	
Nobukazu Hirai	Nobukazu Hirai	2004	
Thomas Hirschman †	Z-Barr	2003	
Joseph Hitchen	Legend; Joe E. Legend	2002–2003	
Ian Hodgkinson	Vampiro	2003–2004	
Daniel Hollie	Damaja	2007	
Joni Horn	Joni Horn; Priscilla; Miss Joni	2002	
Malia Hosaka	Malia Hosaka	2003	
Robert Howard	Bob Holly	2013	
Lance Hoyt	Shadow; Dallas; Lance Hoyt; Lance Rock	2004–2009	
Matthew Hudgins	Brandon P.	2003	
Scott Hudson	Scott Hudson	2002–2005	
Booker Huffman Jr.	Booker T Black Snow	2007–2009; 2010	
Jonathan Hugger	Rellik	2007–2008	
Devon Hughes	Brother Devon; Devon	2005–2013; 2014	
April Hunter	April Hunter; April	2002–2003; 2009	
Curtis Hussey	Dirty Dango; JDC	2022–2026	
Matthew Hyson	Brother Runt	2006–2007; 2009; 2010; 2013	

Company name to Year
NWA: Total Nonstop Action	2002–2004
Total Nonstop Action Wrestling	2004–2017, 2024–present
Global Force Wrestling	June–September 2017
Impact Wrestling	March–June 2017, September 2017–January 2024
Notes
† Indicates they are deceased

== See also ==
- List of Total Nonstop Action Wrestling personnel
