= John T. Bone =

British-born American pornographic film director (1947–2019)

- Born: John Gilbert Bowen; 11 February 1947; Manchester, England
- Died: 26 January 2019 (aged 71); Butner, North Carolina, U.S.
- Other names: Willy Wanker, Harry Horndog, R.T. Longhampton
- Height: 5 ft 10 in (178 cm)
- Website: www.johntbone.com

John Gilbert Bowen (11 February 1947 – 26 January 2019) was a British pornographic film director who used the name John T. Bone. He is best known for directing two large gang bang movies: World's Biggest Gang Bang in 1995 starring Annabel Chong, and World's Biggest Gang Bang II in 1996 starring Jasmin St. Claire.

== Career ==
Bowen started in 1985 and is a member of the AVN Hall of Fame. He has worked for numerous studios and, as Harry Horndog, has also acted in some porn movies. He was best known for directing two large gang bang movies: World's Biggest Gang Bang in 1995 starring Annabel Chong, and World's Biggest Gang Bang II in 1996 starring Jasmin St. Claire. He was interviewed in the documentary Sex: The Annabel Chong Story where it was claimed that he still owed Annabel Chong $10,000 for her performance.

In 1997 Bowen founded the porn company Cream Entertainment together with two partners. The company closed in 2000.

In May 1998 photos of talk show host Jerry Springer having sex with Cream contract girl Kendra Jade in Chicago's Executive Plaza Hotel appeared in the UK tabloid News of the World and the US tabloid The Globe. Kendra's stepmother Kelly Jade was also present in the hotel room, and Kendra, Kelly and Bowen appeared on Springer's show the next day, discussing a 350-person gang bang.

In 2004 Bowen opened an adult film studio in São Paulo, Brazil and started to shoot several movies there. He made porn movies with Brazilian soap opera star Alexandre Frota. He married a Filipino, Glaiza Lobina Bowen, from Oras, Samar, Philippines.

== Later life and death ==
In February 2007 Bone moved to Pattaya, Thailand and rented an apartment together with a friend also from the porn industry. The police raided his apartment and arrested them both on 6 April.

On 26 January 2019, Bone died of pancreatic cancer in a North Carolina federal prison hospital, at the age of 71. At the time of his death, Bone was serving a one-year prison sentence for drug dealing.
