= Candy Apples =

American pornographic actress (born 1976)

- Born: Candace Diane Westphal; October 3, 1976 (age 50); Inglewood, California, U.S.
- Other names: Angelique, Candee Apples; Amanda; Candi Apples (not to be confused with another adult actress by this same name); Cany Apples; Christina Apples
- Occupation: Pornographic actress
- Height: 5 ft 9 in (1.75 m)
- Spouse(s): Bill Nance, 1995–present

Candy Apples (born October 3, 1976) is an American pornographic actress.

== Career ==
Candy Apples was still living at home with her parents when she started making movies at age 19 (in 1995) at an adult film production company. She has stated that she makes "up to $2,000 per scene" in adult movies.

She has appeared several times on the Howard Stern TV and radio shows, and she has been in a Rolling Stones video shoot in Las Vegas at the request of one of her fans, Keith Richards. She has also appeared as herself on the Jerry Springer show.

=== World record gang bang ===
On October 9, 1999, Candy Apples became the world gang bang record holder, which used to be held by porn star Houston, with 742 "instances of sex", including oral sex and strap-on use. Candy Apples was aiming for over 2,000, but the gang bang was eventually halted by a Los Angeles Police raid. She was originally going to marry her then fiancé, now husband, at the end of the gangbang.

== Awards and nominations ==
- 2001 AVN Award nominee – Best Solo Sex Scene (Candy Apples vs. King Dong - Notorious/Multimedia)
- 2001 AVN Award nominee – Best All-Girl Sex Scene, Video (Violation of Bridgette Kerkove - JM Productions) with Bridgette Kerkove, Coral Sands, Daisy Chain, Gwen Summers, Layla Jade & Vivi Anne
