= Jasmin St. Claire =

American pornographic film actress and professional wrestling personality

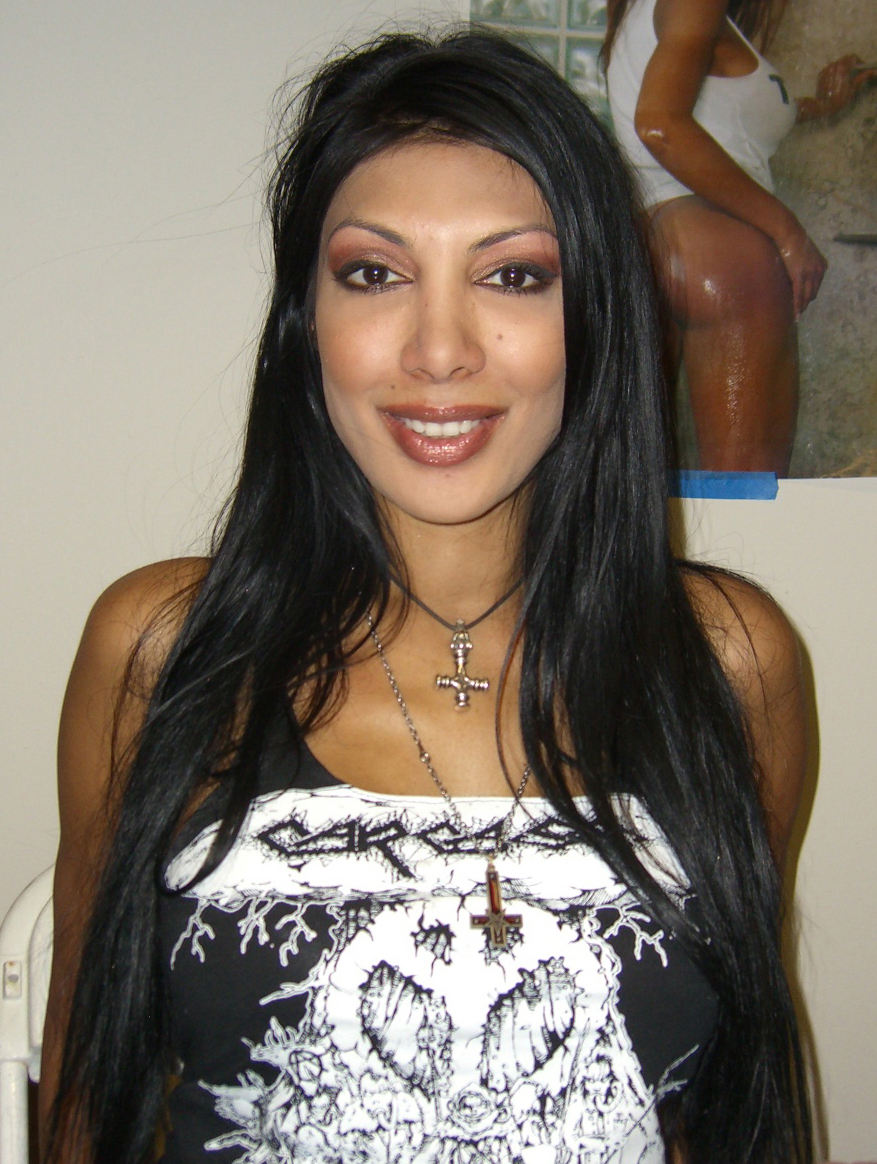
- St. Claire in 2008
- Born: United States
- Professional wrestling career
- Occupations: Pornographic film actress; professional wrestling personality
- Ring name: Jazzy
- Billed height: 5 ft 6 in (1.68 m)
- Billed weight: 110 lb (50 kg)
- Trained by: Sue Saxton; Mando Guerrero; The Blue Meanie
- Debut: 1999
- Retired: 2005

Jasmin St. Claire is an American former pornographic film actress. She is also known for her work as a professional wrestling personality, most notably for Extreme Championship Wrestling (ECW). She has made appearances in the world of professional wrestling and such films as Communication Breakdown (2004) and National Lampoon's Dorm Daze 2: College @ Sea (2006). She also makes frequent appearances for Juggalo Championship Wrestling (JCW) as a manager for various wrestlers.

== Early life ==
St. Claire is an American of Guyanese and Russian descent.

== Film career ==
Among her porn films, St. Claire is known for her appearance in World's Biggest Gang Bang 2, a 1996 sequel to World's Biggest Gang Bang, in which she is advertised as performing a record-breaking 300 sex acts with 300 men in a 24-hour period. St. Claire later described the video as "among the biggest cons ever pulled off in the porn business," with merely about 30 men "strategically placed and filmed," only ten of whom were actually able to perform sexually on camera.

St. Claire was interviewed on The Howard Stern Show for her participation in this film, along with Annabel Chong, the previous record holder, both before and after the event. She was inducted into the AVN Hall of Fame in 2011.

St. Claire subsequently briefly acted in non-pornographic independent films. Since 2003 she has appeared in a number of direct-to-DVD films, including Communication Breakdown and National Lampoon's Dorm Daze 2. She subsequently worked for MetalDarkside, a DVDzine. She also hosted the Metal Scene TV show, and worked as a journalist for Rock Brigade magazine in Brazil.

In 2018 she appeared in the horror film Bad Apples.

== Professional wrestling career ==
St. Claire had a brief stint in ECW, during which she sparred with the "Queen of Extreme" Francine. St. Claire also made appearances for XPW. She made a few appearances for the XWF under the name Jazzy, and managed The Public Enemy.

In July 2002, St. Claire made two appearances for Total Nonstop Action Wrestling. During the first, on July 10, 2002, she performed a strip-tease. A week later, on July 17, Francine attacked St. Claire while she was being interviewed by Goldy Locks. The two had a match later that night which resulted in both women being stripped to their underwear. It ended in a disqualification after interference by The Blue Meanie, and Francine was taken away on a stretcher. This was St. Claire's only wrestling appearance.

St. Claire is currently in Juggalo Championship Wrestling as a manager of Kongo Kong and Mr Happy.

== Awards ==
- 2011 AVN Hall of Fame inductee
- Women's Wrestling Hall of Fame
  - Class of 2026 Non Wrestler Category

== Published works ==
- St. Claire, Jasmin (2010), What the Hell Was I Thinking?!!' Confessions of the World's Most Controversial Sex Symbol, BearManor Media, ISBN 978-1593936044

== See also ==
- Extreme Championship Wrestling
- Xtreme Pro Wrestling
- Pro-Pain Pro Wrestling
- NWA Cyberspace
