= Sex: The Annabel Chong Story =

1999 documentary film

- DVD cover
- Directed by: Gough Lewis
- Written by: Kelly Morris
- Produced by: Gough Lewis; Hugh F. Curry
- Starring: Grace Quek
- Cinematography: Gough Lewis; James Michaels; Kelly Morris; Tony Morrone
- Edited by: Kelly Morris
- Production companies: Coffee House Films; Greycat Releasing; Omni International
- Distributed by: Strand Releasing
- Release dates: January 1999 (Sundance); February 11, 2000
- Running time: 87 minutes
- Country: United States
- Language: English
- Box office: $233,076

Sex: The Annabel Chong Story is a 1999 American documentary film directed, filmed and produced by Canada-based producer Gough Lewis, edited by co-creator Kelly Morris, and produced by Peter Carr.

The film profiles pornographic film actor Grace Quek, a.k.a. Annabel Chong, then a gender studies student at the University of Southern California, famous for setting a gang bang record in January 1995. A video of the event was released under the title The World's Biggest Gang Bang.

After release, Quek criticised Lewis for misconstruing multiple events and portraying events in a "misleading" way, such as claiming to have 'returned' to the industry after going to Singapore or the fact that producer Lewis self-harmed off-camera.

== Synopsis ==
The documentary explores Quek's experiences, presenting her life as a student in Los Angeles, California and London; her native Singapore; and in the porn industry. It focuses on her reasons for working in porn, and her relationship with friends and family.

The documentary reveals that Quek was gang raped as a student living in London and describes her many complex emotional issues, including signs of depression, self-harm and substance abuse. The film also includes footage of a painful conversation in Singapore between Annabel and her mother, who, until then, didn't know about her daughter's porn career.

== Response ==
The documentary became a hit when it was released at the Sundance Film Festival, nominated for the Grand Jury Prize.

North American distribution was halted or minimized as a result of a court case in the Superior Court of Canada, as instigated by David Whitten, a B-movie distributor.

In The Guardian, Jonathan Romney (2000) wrote, "Quek's refusal to cohere as a subject is contingent on the fact that there's apparently no one looking at her: director Lewis is curiously absent, as either a character or as an invisible shaping intelligence. But he apparently was a character in her story: in interviews, Quek has denounced him for failing to reveal that he was her lover for a year during the making of Sex, something the film never even implies. That omission contributes to making the film incomplete, if not actually dishonest."
