= World's Biggest Gang Bang =

1995 pornographic film

- Directed by: John T. Bone
- Starring: Annabel Chong; Ron Jeremy
- Release date: 1995

The World's Biggest Gang Bang is a pornographic film staged in a Hollywood studio starring Annabel Chong and billed as her having sex with 300 men. In reality, the participants were far fewer than advertised. They are said to have engaged with Chong in a total of 251 sex acts. The event was organized by pornographic film director John T. Bone.

The resulting video, released in 1995, is one of the highest-grossing pornographic films ever. The record attempt caught the attention of film director Gough Lewis and Chong became the subject of his documentary Sex: The Annabel Chong Story. Lewis's documentary was a hit at the Sundance Film Festival and was nominated for the Grand Jury Prize.

== Synopsis ==
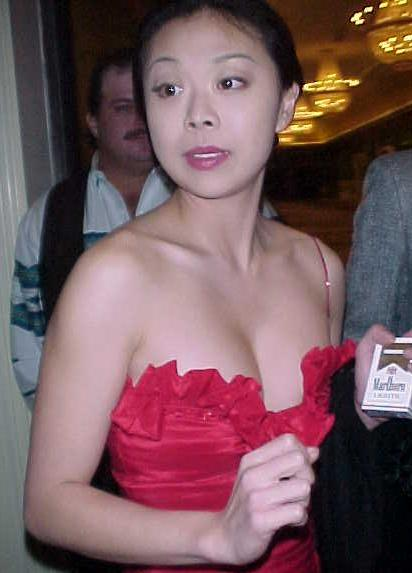
Annabel Chong, the star of the film.

The event begins with a few interviews with some of the participants. Annabel Chong arrives later and is greeted by the event director. Bone briefs Chong on the format and then gives a briefing to the rest of the participants. The footage cuts to an interview Chong gives to the press. Ron Jeremy (host of the event) introduces the fluff girls and commences the gang bang. Chong, changed into a gown, emerges from a side entrance and climbs onto the stage. The stage, built to look like a Roman playground, has a bed in the middle; the setting was intended to allude to the orgy of Roman empress Messalina. Bone, using a loudspeaker, calls for the first five participants. Chong engages in sex acts with the participants for five to ten minutes until the next group is called. Chong had insisted on the use of condoms for the event, but those of the men who were professional performers were allowed to participate without using them.

== Criticism ==
Criticism was levied against the producers of The World's Biggest Gang Bang for the level of risk Chong unknowingly exposed herself to. There was no requirement for the men to be tested for sexually transmitted diseases other than AIDS. It later emerged that they had not provided proof of testing negative for HIV – contrary to what Chong had been led to believe. A number of men participated without the use of a condom.

A seeming failure to pay Chong also attracted criticism. The movie is one of the highest-grossing pornographic films, but as alluded to in the documentary Sex: The Annabel Chong Story, Chong was never paid the US$10,000 she was promised, and apparently did not receive any money at all from the video.

== See also ==
- Jasmin St. Claire
- The World's Biggest Gang Bang III – The Houston 620
