= Annabel Chong =

Singaporean pornographic film actress (born 1972/1973)

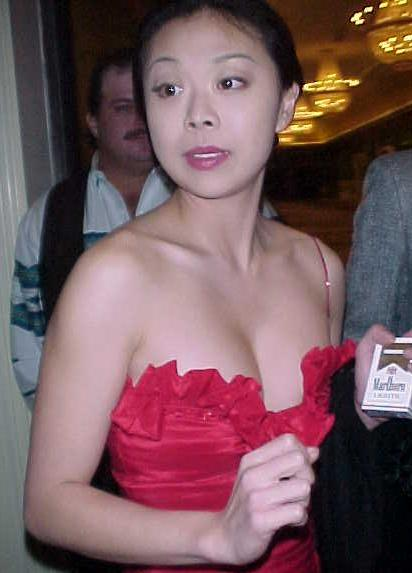
- Chong in 2000
- Born: Grace Quek; 1972 or 1973 (age 53–54); Singapore
- Education: University of Southern California
- Occupation: Pornographic film actress
- Years active: 1994–2003

Grace Quek (Chinese: 郭盈恩; pinyin: Guō Yíng'ēn, born 1972 or 1973), known professionally as Annabel Chong, is a Singaporean former pornographic film actress who became famous after starring in an adult film that was promoted as the World's Biggest Gang Bang. The 1995 film was commercially successful and started a trend of "record-breaking" gang bang pornography. Four years later, Quek was the subject of the documentary Sex: The Annabel Chong Story, in which she was interviewed about her pornography career. She retired from the adult industry completely in 2003 to work in software engineering.

== Early life and education ==
Quek was born and raised in Singapore in a middle-class Protestant Singaporean Chinese family. She was the only child of two teachers. She was a student at Raffles Girls' School, where she was enlisted in the country's Gifted Education Programme and Hwa Chong Junior College. Former teachers and classmates describe Quek as quiet, conservative, intelligent, and studious.

After taking her A-levels, she took three gap years, including a year spent in the United States, before going on to study law at King's College London on a scholarship.

While in England, Quek was riding on a train and met a man she became attracted to, and agreed to have sex with him in an alleyway. He brought along other men, and she was gang raped and robbed in a rubbish closet under an inner-city housing block.

At the age of 21, she dropped out of law school and went on to study photography, art and gender studies at the University of Southern California (USC), where she excelled academically. At the same time, she also began working in pornographic films. She later went on to do graduate studies in gender studies at USC.

== Pornographic film career ==
Since her parents did not approve of her dropping out of law school, she needed a source of income to pay her college fees. In 1994, she started in porn by answering an advertisement for a modelling agency in LA Weekly. Quek was reportedly interested in blurring the boundary between pornography and performance art in her work.

=== World's Biggest Gang Bang ===
The production that propelled her into the limelight was another Bone production, The World's Biggest Gang Bang. Quek took part in this gang bang on 19 January 1995, when she was 22 years old. She said part of her motivation to do the film was a desire to challenge gender roles. She appeared in advertisements on adult television to solicit 300 participants for the event. Initial reports differed as to whether she had sex with 251 men over the course of 10 hours, or with around 70 men multiple times to reach a total of 251: the largest number ever in a pornographic film. Acting on the understanding that male participants who had verified a recent negative test for HIV would wear a colour-coded tag, Quek had sex with some men without a condom. It later emerged that the testing had not been as strictly verified as the producers had led her to believe. Even though the film became one of the highest-grossing pornographic films of all time, she was never paid the US$10,000 she was promised, and she apparently never received any money from the video.

=== Appearances in popular media ===
After the event Quek made a host of media appearances, including The Jerry Springer Show and The Girlie Show. Loretta Chen viewed Quek's work in pornography as an attempt to challenge the settled notions and assumptions of viewers about female sexuality and gender boundaries, but was not taken seriously enough. For example, her conception of a gang bang was based on the example of Messalina, a wife of the emperor Claudius. Historically Messalina suffered from a poor reputation, a fact that some attributed (at least partly) to gender bias. According to Quek, she sought to question the double standard that denies women the ability to exhibit the same sexuality as men, by modelling what a female "stud" would be.

In her March 2000 appearance on the radio program Loveline, Quek admitted that there were slightly fewer than 70 men in her gang bang and that there were water and lunch breaks during the ten-hour shoot. For her performance, she earned a "dubious achievement award" in Esquire magazine.

The event also prompted author Chuck Palahniuk to write a novel, Snuff, about a fictional character who aimed to surpass Quek's record by having sex with 600 men. In 2007 a play written by Ng Yi Sheng based on her story, 251, was staged in Singapore, directed by Loretta Chen.

=== Sex: The Annabel Chong Story ===
Quek's media appearances caught the interest of Canadian film student Gough Lewis. He met Quek and set out to produce a documentary about her. While filming, Quek and Lewis became involved in a romantic relationship. The film, Sex: The Annabel Chong Story, was released in 1999. It includes footage from the gang bang shooting and her subsequent publicity appearances, explores her motives, revisits with her the site of her rape and depicts a painful conversation in Singapore between Quek and her mother, who had not known about her daughter's porn career before then. It was directed by Lewis and featured contributions from Quek, Al Goldstein, Ron Jeremy and Seymore Butts. In the film, Quek stated that she intended the World's Biggest Gang Bang to challenge "the notion of women as passive sex objects," and added, "We're not wilting violets, we're not victims, for Christ's sake. Female sexuality is as aggressive as male sexuality. I wanted to take on the role of the stud. The more [partners], the better." She also self-harmed in the film, taking a knife to her arm on the day Lewis and Quek broke up. What the documentary didn't show was that Lewis was doing the same to himself off-camera.

The documentary propelled her further into the world media as it became a hit at the 1999 Sundance Film Festival, where it was nominated for a Grand Jury Prize. Since the release of the documentary, Quek has accused Lewis of misconstruing events in the film and portraying events in a "misleading" way.

=== Late pornography career and retirement ===
Quek continued to work in the adult industry for a short while after the documentary came out, directing and starring in films as well as setting up a website. In 2000, she directed and performed in the gang bang film Pornomancer, her take on William Gibson's novel Neuromancer. After 2000, she largely stopped appearing in mainstream adult videos, concentrating instead on producing content for her website and appearing in a few BDSM videos. In 2003, she completely retired from porn, thanking her fans in a final message on her website that announced, "Annabel is dead and is now replaced full time by her Evil Doppelgänger, who is incredibly bored with the entire concept of Annabel and would prefer to do something different for a change." She stated that she intended to "begin her new life of peace and relative obscurity." She stopped discussing her former career in the adult industry after her retirement. In limited correspondence for the biographical play 251, she told the producers, "Do whatever you want with Annabel Chong because this person doesn't exist anymore." In 2011, Complex magazine ranked her at #41 in their list of "The Top 50 Hottest Asian Porn Stars of All Time".

In 2000, while working in a strip club, she role-played as a student learning how to write computer code, while her client would spank her whenever she made a mistake. After the role-play, she was inspired to learn how to write computer code. In 2001, she attained an associate degree in software engineering at Westwood College. After graduating, she worked as a freelance consultant until becoming a full-time engineer after retiring from pornography. She has also worked in California as a web developer. In 2025, she announced on social media that she was moving back to Singapore to take care of her mother.
