= Houston (actress) =

American pornographic actress

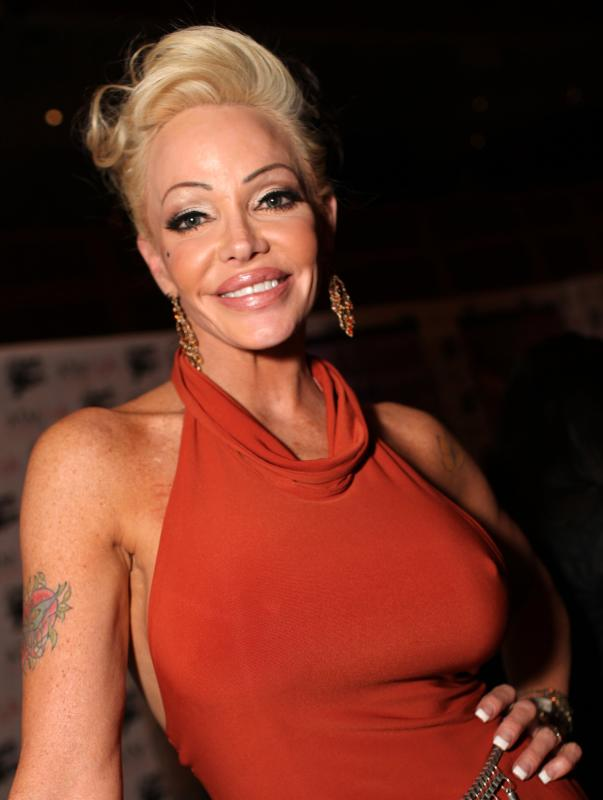
- Houston at the 2013 AVN Adult Entertainment Expo
- Born: Kimberly Halsey; March 24, 1969 (age 57); Long Beach, California, U.S.
- Occupation: Pornographic actress
- Height: 5 ft 7 in (1.70 m)

Kimberly Halsey, (born March 24, 1969) known professionally as Houston, is an American pornographic actress. She was inducted into the AVN Hall of Fame in 2004 and into the XRCO Hall of Fame in 2015. Houston once held the gangbang record by having sex 620 times over the course of 8 hours.

== Career ==
Houston is known for her work in Metro's The World's Biggest Gang Bang III – The Houston 620 (1999), a movie in which she reportedly had sex with over 620 men without interruption on February 6, 1999. A 1999 Salon article about that day described her as "A surgically enhanced cartoon bombshell... [who] looks like the love child of Jessica Rabbit and Bart Simpson."

In 2012, Houston returned to the adult film industry after a ten-year hiatus and performed in her first comeback scene with Keiran Lee for Brazzers in a scene titled "Sex Games".

=== Music videos ===
In 2000, Houston appeared on VH-1's Porn to Rock documentary, which chronicled the efforts of various adult industry actors attempting to make the crossover to mainstream careers in various rock and roll endeavors. During the next few years, Houston appeared in cameo roles in various rock/rap videos, notably for bands such as Kottonmouth Kings ("Bump") and Sum 41 ("The Hell Song"). She released her first single, "What Do You Want From Me?" in late 2003 and made a subsequent musical performance at the House of Blues in Los Angeles.

=== Cameo TV appearances ===
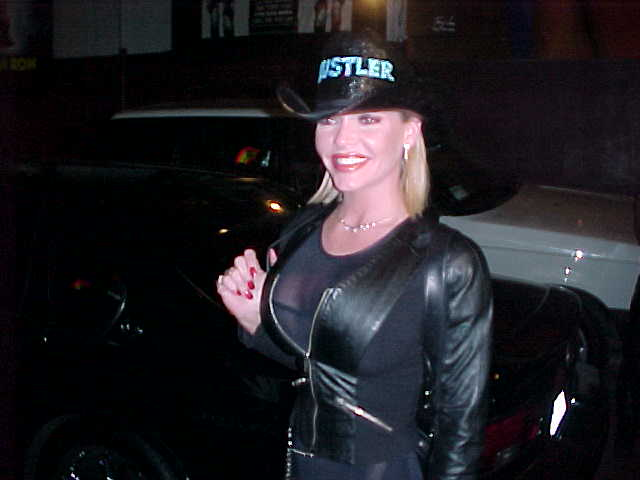
Houston in 1999

In 1999, Houston was on The Howard Stern Show to promote the fact that she was having her labia surgically trimmed to enhance her "look" during close-up video work. In a subsequent online auction, Houston reportedly sold her labia for an estimated $50,000 according to online auction, Erotic Bid.

Houston was also in the 2012 documentary After Porn Ends, which is about life after being a porn actor. In May 2012, she released her autobiography, Pretty Enough: The Story of the Gang Bang Queen, co-written with Charles Lupula.
