= Ian Harrison (wrestler) =

British professional wrestler and bodybuilder

Personal information
- Born: 3 January 1969 (age 57) Leeds, England

Professional wrestling career
- Ring name(s): Awe; Ian Harrison
- Billed height: 5 ft 10 in (1.78 m)
- Billed weight: 258 lb (117 kg)
- Billed from: The United Kingdom
- Debut: 1999

External image
- Harrison during his professional wrestling days

Ian Harrison (born 3 January 1969), better known by his ring name, "British Storm" Ian Harrison, is an English former professional wrestler and bodybuilder.

In professional wrestling, Harrison is best known for his time in the short lived XWF promotion run by Jimmy Hart. While in the XWF, Harrison held his first and only singles professional wrestling championship, the XWF World Heavyweight Championship. Harrison was awarded the championship in preparation for a storyline "XWF Invasion" of Puerto Rico's World Wrestling Council promotion. Working under the name "Awe" he was also awarded the XWF World Tag Team Titles with his partner Shock (Del Rios) in Memphis Wrestling but would vacate the title when he left the promotion.

As a bodybuilder, Harrison competed in many competitions and picked up wins as Mr. Britain (Junior) and Mr. Universe (Junior) in 1988. Ian was an IFBB pro and competed at the Mr Olympia and Arnold Classic, he retired after not placing top 5 at the Arnold Classic in 1998. He turned professional in 1989 (competing until 1998) and was known for his immense physical strength and his ability to do ten or more reps with a set of 200 pound dumbbells.

== Early life and Bodybuilding ==
According to Harrison's official website, "Ian was born in Leeds, West Yorkshire, England in 1969. He began studying Judo when he was 8 years old and began weight training at the age of 15. He competed in the bodybuilding industry from the age of 16 when he won the U-17 Mr. Yorkshire and then at 19 he won Junior Mr. Universe in London, England. In 1989 Ian won the Heavyweight and Overall titles at the IFBB British Championship at the age of 20 therefore achieving Professional status. He was the youngest ever to do so. He then started his first gym, Body Balance, in Leeds and trained at that facility throughout his bodybuilding career, 1993-1998. Ian competed 3 years in the Arnold Classic, Mr. Olympia in ’95, and guest posed worldwide. 13 magazine covers, and a plethora of training articles Ian was ranked top 10 in the world for 5 years straight and became known as an authority in training and nutrition."

In 1991, Harrison starred in a set of commercials produced by Sega France to promote the Sega Mega Drive, playing the character of a post-apocalyptic punk who is blown away by the power of the console.

== Professional wrestling career ==
In a 1999 interview with Anabolic Extreme's Jason Mueller, Harrison revealed that in his time away from the bodybuilding scene he had been spending time traveling all over Wales and Scotland learning how to wrestle. Stating that he was still a bodybuilder at heart, he wasn't opposed to pursuing a career in wrestling if it really took off.

In 2001 the American Professional Wrestling scene had witnessed the fall of two influential promotions of the modern era as Extreme Championship Wrestling filed for bankruptcy, and World Championship Wrestling was acquired by the World Wrestling Entertainment. Looking to fill the void left with just one major promotion running the show, wrestling manager Jimmy Hart and a number of other famous wrestlers formed the XWF. Harrison was signed to the promotion with high hopes that his unique look and incredible physique would help make him become one of the company's homegrown stars. Since the XWF didn't have a television deal, all matches were taped in hopes of using the footage to secure a deal with a network.

He debuted on XWF programming as a heel, professional wrestling terminology for a "bad guy," or "villain" and sported trunks with Britain's Union Jack across the front and the back. In his debut, he made short work of Horace Hogan, dominating his opponent with a powerslam and mounted strikes before finishing him off with a leg scissors submission hold placed around the head and neck of Horace who was forced to submit at one minute and thirty five seconds into the contest. During his time with the promotion he also competed against Norman Smiley, and worked with Curt Hennig against Buff Bagwell and Vampiro. He was undefeated during his time with the promotion.

Though the taped episodes never made the airwaves in the United States, they were aired in Puerto Rico where a storyline "XWF Invasion" was written to take place in Puerto Rico's World Wrestling Council in order for the company to receive some exposure. In preparation for this planned invasion, the XWF Heavyweight Championship was awarded to Harrison in August 2002.

Harrison briefly wrestled for Memphis Wrestling on behalf of the XWF, who were running yet another invasion angle. In Memphis, he would compete under the name "Awe" and primarily wrestle in tag team matches with his partner Shock. "Shock & Awe" were announced as the XWF World Tag Team Champions on an edition of Memphis Wrestling's television show 31 May 2003 and would hold onto the titles until Harrison left the promotion.

Harrison appeared in TNA on their sixth weekly PPV, having a backstage altercation with Jeff Jarrett and defeating Bo Dupp by DQ.

== Personal life ==
Ian is married to Jane and has a daughter named Christie and son named Mack. He has retired from professional wrestling and used to operate "City Fitness" gym in Bradenton, Florida. Ian now devotes himself full time to running PCA USA. Physical Culture Association, a bodybuilding federation whose core aim is to put the athlete first. Ian suffered several heart attacks over the years having to undergo open heart surgery."

== Championships and accomplishments ==
- Xcitement Wrestling Federation
  - XWF World Heavyweight Championship (1 time)
  - XWF World Tag Team Championship (1 time) - with Shock
