= Xcitement Wrestling Federation =

Professional wrestling promotion

XWF Wrestling, LLC.
- Type: Privately held limited liability company
- Industry: Professional Wrestling; Sports Entertainment; Rasslin; Puroresu; Lucha Libre
- Founded: 2001
- Defunct: 2002
- Headquarters: Tampa, Florida; Spring Hill, Florida, U.S.
- Key people: Jimmy Hart - President
- Parent: SunWest Management Services, LLC

The X Wrestling Federation (XWF) (later referred to as the Xcitement Wrestling Federation) was an American professional wrestling promotion that operated from 2001 to 2002.

The previous number two and three American promotions, World Championship Wrestling and Extreme Championship Wrestling, had folded earlier in 2001, leaving only one national wrestling company. As such, the letter "X" in XWF stood for the missing variable in the sport. The official definition of the "X" became Xcitement as cited by "Mean" Gene Okerlund in the Extras on the XWF DVD and not "Xtreme" as sometimes written.

== History ==
=== Formation ===
The idea of the XWF was generated when Kevin Harrington pitched the idea of replacing the then-AOL Time Warner owned World Championship Wrestling, which was just purchased by rival competitor the World Wrestling Federation. He suggested this plan to several wrestling superstars at the time, including Hulk Hogan, Jimmy Hart, The Nasty Boys, and Greg Valentine. These conversations led to the X Wrestling Federation coming together and Hart becoming the President of the company.

The basis of the XWF was to create a wrestling promotion showcasing family-friendly entertainment, all while displaying the talents of past legends and future superstars, similar to the format that was used on WCW Saturday Night and WCW Main Event. The intent was to create a PG-style of wrestling that was similar to what WCW presented before the nWo was formed.

The XWF along with World Wrestling All-Stars which was also formed in 2001 would provide fans an alternative to the WWF and also give the wrestlers another place to work, since the WWF had become the only nationally televised wrestling organization.

=== TV tapings ===
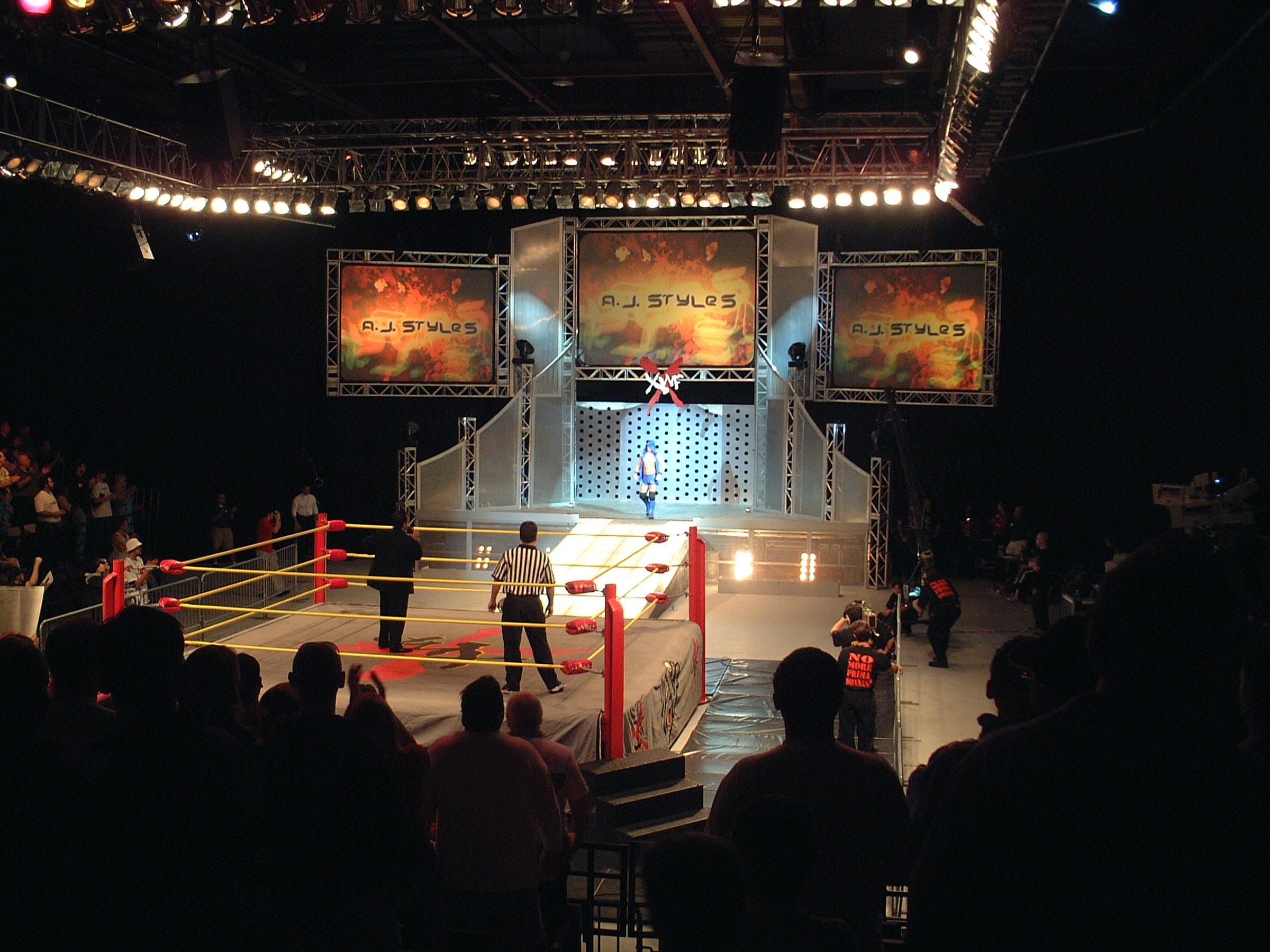
AJ Styles coming to the ring for a XWF event.

The initial XWF tapings were conducted in November 2001 at Universal Studios in Orlando, Florida, in the soundstage that used to be the home for the WCW Worldwide Wrestling tapings, and later the home for Total Nonstop Action Wrestling's TV tapings for iMPACT! and Xplosion as well as some of its pay-per-views. Former WCW play-by-play announcer Tony Schiavone and former WWF color commentator Jerry Lawler were brought in to call the matches. Lawler had left the WWF earlier in the year, in protest, after he felt they had unfairly fired his then-wife Stacy Carter. Shortly after the tapings, Lawler and Carter divorced, he mended fences with the WWF, and asked the XWF to be let out of his contract so that he could return there. They also brought in Mean Gene Okerlund to be their locker room interviewer. The storylines were based on a struggle for power in the company between Rena Mero (formerly Sable in the WWF), who was the heel CEO, and Rowdy Roddy Piper, the babyface commissioner. The XWF Roster was a mixture of former WWF, WCW, and ECW Stars, as well as several indy stars. They brought in Hulk Hogan, with the hope that he would be both a wrestler and a part owner of the company. He would then wrestle and defeat Curt Hennig (who was accompanied by his "agent" Bobby Heenan) in his only match at the tapings. In addition to Hogan and Hennig other stars included; Vampiro, Buff Bagwell, A.J. Styles, Christopher Daniels, the Nasty Boys, Hacksaw Jim Duggan, Jimmy Snuka Jr. (managed by Jimmy Snuka Sr.), Marty Jannetty, Greg Valentine, Horace Hogan, Ryan Sakoda (who wrestled as Vapor and was managed by Sonny Onoo), Low Ki (who wrestled as Quick Kick), Kid Kash, Juventud Guerrera, Psicosis, Konnan, Carly Colón (who was accompanied by Carlos Colón, Sr.), Maximum Force (Simon and Swinger, who were managed by Dawn Marie), Johnny B. Badd, Norman Smiley, the KISS Demon (managed by Gene Simmons), Devon Storm (Crowbar in WCW), Big Vito, the Road Warriors, Public Enemy (who wrestled as the South Philly Posse), the Shane Twins, Josh Matthews, and Emory Hail (The Machine in WCW; managed by Jimmy Hart). Ten episodes were taped, and prepared for broadcast. The talents were only signed for the initial set of tapings. Shortly after the tapings, WWF owner Vince McMahon poached several of their key talents such as Lawler, Hogan, Hennig, Piper, and others. Hart expressed his frustration in an interview. He explained that they would go to network executives to pitch the show. The executives would get excited by the roster, but Hart and company would then have to explain that several talents were no longer with the XWF and had gone to the WWF. They would then get turned down.

During the tapings, a joint angle was worked with the Puerto Rico-based World Wrestling Council (WWC) which began by having Ray González appear backstage speaking to Hogan, Bagwell and other talents in an effort to have them join his La Familia del Milenio stable. This was worked along WAPA-TV, which produced a prime time special titled XWF vs. WWC: Invasión, but the angle was heavily modified since it featured the reduced roster and González left for the IWA-PR. More cards were co-promoted, with WWC ultimately winning a series where the only consequential outcome was a title change of the XWF World Tag Team Championship.

=== House shows ===
Following the initial tapings held in fall 2001, the XWF held their first three shows in Hammond, Indiana; Milwaukee, Wisconsin; and Green Bay, Wisconsin. In Spring 2002 the promotion ran more shows, and a series of house shows in Texas. In addition to the wrestlers that stayed on, the XWF brought in Rey Mysterio, who teamed with his longtime friend Konnan against the Nasty Boys, and hardcore legend Terry Funk, who wrestled Greg Valentine. The XWF scheduled a second series of house shows in Michigan, but ultimately had to cancel them due to low ticket sales. After not being able to secure a television deal, the promotion later folded.

With the XWF folding, TNA and Ring of Honor Wrestling which were both formed in 2002 ultimately became the new alternatives to the WWF.

=== Jimmy Hart era ===
Jimmy Hart acquired the rights for the XWF for an undetermined amount in 2004. In September 2004, the idea of bringing a special television series about the XWF to The Wrestling Channel and likely other channels thereafter was explored by Hart. The collaboration with WWC was briefly revived during this time. During July 2005, the XWF released a three DVD series called In Your Face: The Lost Episodes of the XWF. It featured 19 matches from the original Universal Studios tapings with extras including an interview with Hulk Hogan. The series is hosted by Jimmy Hart and Brian Knobs. They also broadcast a series of pay-per-views on DISH Network featuring matches from the tapings.

== Championships ==
=== XWF World Heavyweight Championship ===
Champion(s)	Times	Date	Location	Notes	Ref
XWF World Heavyweight Championship
Ian Harrison	1	September 14, 2002	Bayamón, Puerto Rico	Title awarded by XWF later defeat Super Gladiador to still champion.	
Mabel	1	July 12, 2003	Memphis, Tennessee	Title awarded.	
Title stripped on January 31, 2004 in Memphis, Tennessee after Mabel not defending the title.
Shock	1	March 6, 2004	Memphis, Tennessee	Won a tournament final.	
Jerry Lawler	1	May 29, 2004	Memphis, Tennessee		
Title inactive and abandoned on August 28, 2004 in Memphis, Tennessee.

=== XWF World Tag Team Championship ===
Champion(s)	Times	Date	Location	Notes	Ref
XWF World Tag Team Championship
The Nasty Boys (Brian Knobbs & Jerry Sags)	1	November 14, 2001	Orlando, Florida	Defeated The Road Warriors, The Sweet Philly Posse and The Shane Twins in a 4-way match.	
Shock & Awe	1	May 31, 2003	Memphis, Tennessee		
Titles Inactives and abandoned on June 28, 2003 in Memphis, Tennessee after Awe left from Memphis Wrestling.
The Money Inc. (Mike Money & Bain)	1	March 6, 2004	Memphis, Tennessee	Won a tournament final.	
Titles Inactives and abandoned on August 28, 2004 in Memphis, Tennessee.

=== XWF World Cruiserweight Championship ===
Champion(s)	Times	Date	Location	Notes	Ref
XWF World Cruiserweight Championship
Kid Kash	1	November 13, 2001	Boston, Massachusetts	Won a 5-man battle royal.	
Juventud Guerrera	1	November 14, 2001	Lincoln, New Hampshire		
Kid Kash	2	November 22, 2001	Orlando, Florida		
Title inactive and abandoned on August 28, 2004 in Memphis, Tennessee.

=== XWF World Women's Championship ===
Champion(s)	Times	Date	Location	Notes	Ref
XWF World Women's Championship
Christie Ricci	1	October 2, 2001	Santa Monica, California	Won a tournament final.	
Title inactive and abandoned on August 28, 2004 in Memphis Tennessee.
