= Harry Del Rios =

American professional wrestler

Personal information
- Born: September 17, 1972 (age 54) New York, New York, U.S.

Professional wrestling career
- Ring name(s): Big Titan; Del Rios; Elijah; Gangsta B.I.G. Magnificent Maurice; Phantasio; Shock; Spellbinder; Streak; Super Spell
- Billed height: 6 ft 3 in (1.91 m)
- Billed weight: 273 lb (124 kg)
- Debut: 1993
- Retired: 2012

Harry Del Rios (born September 17, 1972) is an American professional wrestler. Rios is best known as the Spellbinder and Phantasio from WWE, but he has competed under many other ring names during his career.

== Professional wrestling career ==
=== United States Wrestling Association (1993–1997) ===
Del Rios' first prominent wrestling role was in the United States Wrestling Association. He debuted there on September 13, 1993. He wrestled as the Spellbinder for the first 4 matches of his career, then switched to wrestling under his real name, then switched back to the Spellbinder gimmick in March 1994. He would use the Spellbinder gimmick for the remainder of his time in USWA. He feuded with Brian Christopher in 1997. He appeared on USWA TV in January & February. He stayed until USWA folded in 1997.

=== World Wrestling Federation (1993, 1995, 1997) ===
Del Rios made his first appearance in World Wrestling Federation (WWF) when he wrestled a dark match against Bobby Who on the May 10, 1993 episode of Monday Night Raw at the Manhattan Center. He received another tryout at the 2nd anniversary taping of Raw in Houston, TX on January 2, 1995 when he defeated Reno Riggins.

Rios made one televised appearance on the July 16, 1995 episode of Wrestling Challenge. He portrayed a babyface named "Phantasio", a magician wrestler. Phantasio wore a black and white mime mask (which he handed to a young fan sitting at ringside) that revealed matching facepaint when removed. He defeated Tony DeVito by sneaking up from behind, and magically pulling out his boxers allowing him to roll up DeVito for the victory. After the match, he magically removed the boxers (black and white colored) of referee Earl Hebner. Though he never again appeared on TV, he did wrestle a match against Rad Radford at a house show in a victorious effort.

Rios returned in 1997, appearing in a dark match on the March 17, 1997 episode of Monday Night Raw held in Syracuse, NY. Wrestling as The Spellbinder, Rios was defeated by Aldo Montoya. He wrestled on a trio of house shows held in Tennessee against Mark Henry in December of that year.

=== Independent Circuit (1997–2002) ===
He continued to wrestle in various Memphis promotions after leaving the USWA. He won the NWA North American Tag Team Title with Brian Christopher in 1999, and the Power Pro Wrestling Heavyweight title in 2000.

=== Total Nonstop Action Wrestling (2002) ===
Harry Del Rios competed on NWA:TNA's first-ever broadcast on June 19, 2002. He wrestled as Del Rios (essentially a rip-off of Scott Steiner and his "Big Poppa Pump" character), but was not used by TNA after the initial broadcast.

=== Later career (2003–2012) ===
In 2003, Rios made a short lived comeback as Shock. He teamed up with wrestler Awe ("British Storm" Ian Harrison). The team would wrestle primarily in Memphis Wrestling. He retired from wrestling in 2005.

In the December 2006 issue of WWE Magazine, there is a short interview with Harry Del Rios concerning the Phantasio character. Del Rios claims that the idea originated as a combination of the Ultimate Warrior and Legion of Doom gimmicks. He also hinted at a possible return of the Phantasio persona.

On June 2, 2012 Del Rios revived The Phantasio character at Pro Wrestling Syndicate in a winning effort against Simon Dean in Rahway, NJ.

== Championships and accomplishments ==
- Memphis Wrestling
  - Memphis Wrestling Southern Heavyweight Championship (1 time)
- NWA Main Event
  - NWA North American Tag Team Championship (1 time) - with Brian Christopher
- Power Pro Wrestling
  - Power Pro Wrestling Heavyweight Championship (1 time)
- Pro Wrestling Illustrated
  - Ranked No. 260 of the top 500 singles wrestlers in the PWI 500 in 1997
- United States Wrestling Association
  - USWA Heavyweight Championship (2 times)
- Xcitement Wrestling Federation
  - XWF World Heavyweight Championship (1 time)
  - XWF World Tag Team Championship (1 time) - with Awe
