= Gang bang =

Sex with several individuals at the same time

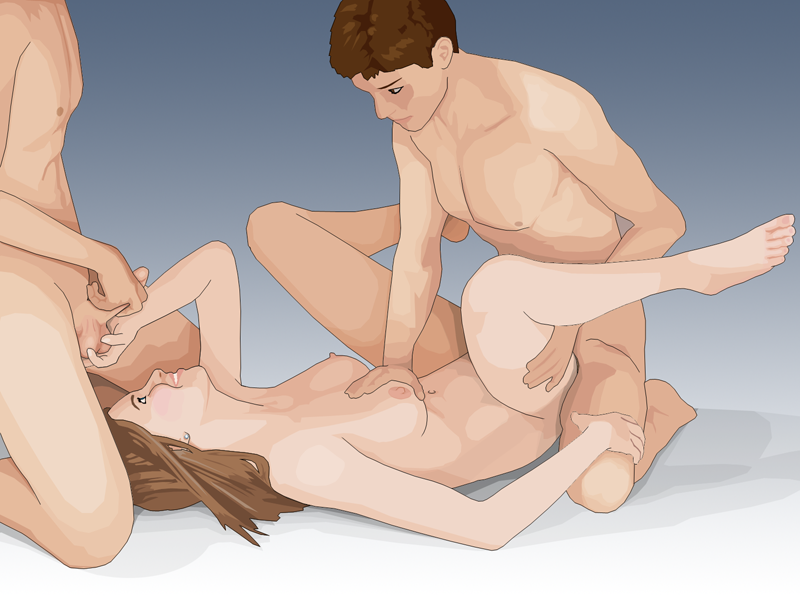
A gang bang

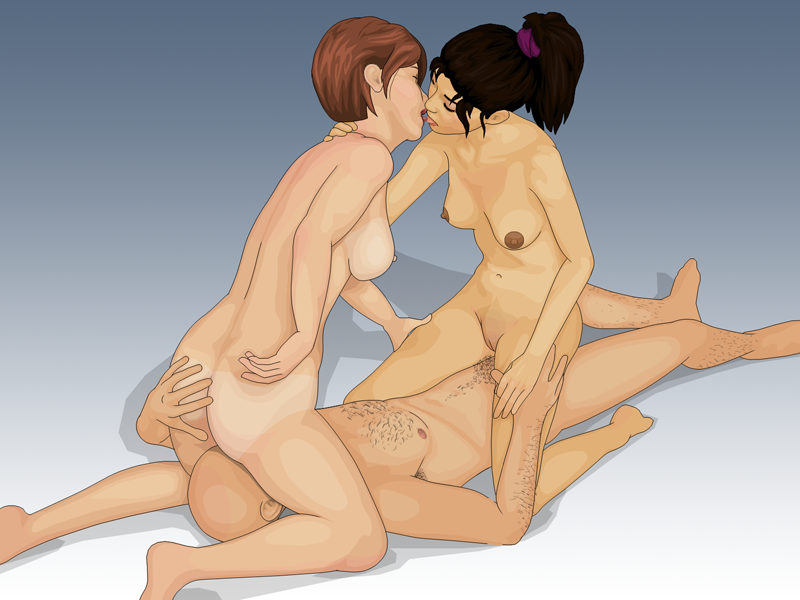
A reverse gang bang

A gang bang is a sexual activity in which one person is the central focus of the sexual activity of several people, usually more than three, sequentially or simultaneously. The term generally refers to a woman being the focus; one man with multiple women can be referred to as a "reverse gang bang". The term has become associated with the porn industry and usually describes a staged event wherein a woman has sex with several men in direct succession. Bukkake is a type of gang bang, originating in Japan, that focuses on the central person being ejaculated upon by multiple male participants.

== Practice ==
The largest gang bangs are sponsored by pornographic film companies, and recorded, but a gang bang is not unusual in the swinger community. It is more often considered to have multiple men and one woman, while a so-called "reverse gang bang" (one man and many women), which can be seen in pornography. Female-on-female and male-on-male gang bangs also happen.

Gang bangs are not defined by the precise number of participants, but usually involve more than three people and may involve a dozen or more. When the gang bang is organized specifically to culminate with the (near) simultaneous or rapid serial ejaculations of all male participants on the central man or woman, then it may be referred to by the Japanese term bukkake.

Three people engaged in sex is normally referred to as a threesome, and four people are normally referred to as a foursome.

== Pornography ==
Though there have been numerous gang bang pornographic films since the 1980s, they usually involved no more than half a dozen to a dozen men. However, starting with The World's Biggest Gangbang (1995) starring Annabel Chong with 251 partners, the pornographic industry began producing a series of films ostensibly setting gangbang records for most consecutive sex acts by one person in a short period.

These kinds of films were financially successful, winning AVN Awards for the best-selling pornographic films of their year; however, the events were effectively unofficiated and the record-breaking claims often misleading. Jasmin St. Claire described her "record", purportedly set with 300 men in World's Biggest Gang Bang 2, as "among the biggest cons ever pulled off in the porn business", with merely about 30 men "strategically placed and filmed", only ten of whom were actually able to perform sexually on camera.

== See also ==
- Bukkake
- Group sex
- Orgy
- Swinging
- Gang rape
