= Forced Entry =

Forced Entry may refer to:

- Forced entry (or forcible entry): entering into property, lawfully or unlawfully, by use of force

In film:

- Forced Entry (1973 film), a pornographic film
- Forced Entry (1975 film), a horror film remake of the 1973 film
- Forced Entry (2002 film), a pornographic film released by Extreme Associates
- Forced Entry, a 2007 pornographic film starring Rod Barry
- Forced Entry, a short film by Brooke "Mikey" Anderson

In music:

- Forced Entry (band), a thrash metal band

In television:

- "Forced Entry" (CSI: Miami), an episode
- "Forced Entry" (NCIS), an episode

In computer security:

- FORCEDENTRY, a spyware component
