= Cannibalism: The Last Supper =

- DVD released by Extreme Associates
- Directed by: Lizzy Borden
- Written by: Lizzy Borden
- Starring: Veronica Caine; Alexandra Quinn; Brandi Lyons; Brooke Hunter; Lena Ramon; Sheila Marie; Lizzy Borden
- Edited by: Lynkoln Townekharr
- Music by: Lil' Merchant; Fornicator
- Production company: Extreme Associates
- Distributed by: Extreme Associates
- Release date: April 21, 2002 (United States)
- Running time: 135 minutes
- Country: United States
- Language: English

Cannibalism: The Last Supper is a 2002 pornographic horror film written and directed by Lizzy Borden and produced and distributed by Extreme Associates. It stars Veronica Caine as Mrs. Caine, the leader of a Satanic cannibal cult, and also stars Alexandra Quinn, Brandi Lyons, Brooke Hunter, Lena Ramon, and Sheila Marie.

== Plot ==
A couple, Mr. and Mrs. Caine, do cocaine with another couple, Brandi and Scott. Scott is drugged with spiked wine, and he and Mr. Caine have rough sex with Brandi. Brandi and Scott are afterward asphyxiated with plastic bags and cannibalized (offscreen) by the Caines. Later, Mrs. Caine performs an occult ritual, using a desecrated Ouija board to commune with Satan before having a threesome with two new inductees into her cannibal cult as a means of welcoming them into "Satan's family."

In her office, Mrs. Caine and a masked woman solicit a call girl named Alex. Mrs. Caine leads Alex into a viscera-filled dungeon, where Alex is raped by two Satanists while Mrs. Caine alternates between tormenting a male prisoner and Alex. Mrs. Caine eventually forces the prisoner to help her disembowel Alex. Elsewhere, two bickering recruiters for the cult stave off their duties by having sex in a hearse in the name of Satan.

The film ends with the cultists, their female captives in tow, holding a Black Mass, followed by a cannibal feast and an orgy (which includes urolagnia and the rape of the prisoners, one of them a virgin) overseen by Mrs. Caine.

== Cast ==
- Veronica Caine as Mrs. Caine
- Alexandra Quinn as Alex
- Brandi Lyons as Brandi
- Brooke Hunter as Cultist in Hearse
- Lena Ramon as Cult Orgy Participant
- Sheila Marie as Cult Orgy Participant
- Lizzy Borden as Masked Cultist
- Mickey G. as Mr. Caine
- Mr. Pete as Cult Inductee
- Brett Rockman as Cult Inductee
- Rod Fontana as Cultist in Office
- Rick Masters as Cult Orgy Participant
- Don Hollywood as Cultist in Hearse
- Angel as Cult Orgy Participant
- Dr. Jeckyl as Cult Orgy Participant
- Sylvia as Cult Orgy Participant
- Pat Trick as Cult Orgy Participant
- Scott Lyons as Scott
- Ravika as Cult Orgy Participant

== Reception ==
Johnny Maldoro, in a review written for The Village Voice, noted that the "cartoonish" film "plops rape scenes in a latter-day Donner Party situation, just without the starvation and covered wagons" and contained vast amounts of gore, concluding, "In Cannibalism, the fear and wonder surrounding women's bodies intersect. Scarily enough, gore and porn make perfect bedfellows. You just have to be prepared to change the sheets." Michael Scott of Adult Industry News gave Cannibalism a positive review, calling it "very hot" as well as "gross" and "a real must see for the forced sex crowd, fake snuff crowd, and gross out crowd" before concluding, "If your into it watch it all, if not watch out!" Peter Van Aarle of Cyberspace Adult Video Reviews gave the film a score of 7.50/10.00 (on a scale of 6.00/10.00) and sardonically wrote, "Sex rating is 9.00. Silliness rating is 6.00."

Richard Dunstan of Indiefilm noted that Cannibalism was "uncommon horror porn" and "the most overtly cannibalistic 'adult' movie made to date" (in spite of there being "little on screen cannibalism") and was ultimately, "not the sort of porn you see everyday." Dick Dietrick of Rec.Arts.Movies.Erotica opined that the film was "nothing shocking" and wrote, "Pretty much all the scenes end up with some weird imagery where the girls involved are now eaten alive, but this occurs after the sex is over." ViceList had a middling response to the film, stating, "It takes a lot of lighting, costumes, props and special effects to make truly frightening cinema. The horror genre has been pushed such that you can't scare people on a budget anymore. Combined with the fact that there is no real rhyme or reason behind this orgy of blood, it simply falls short of the mark."
