= Shock art =

Form of contemporary art

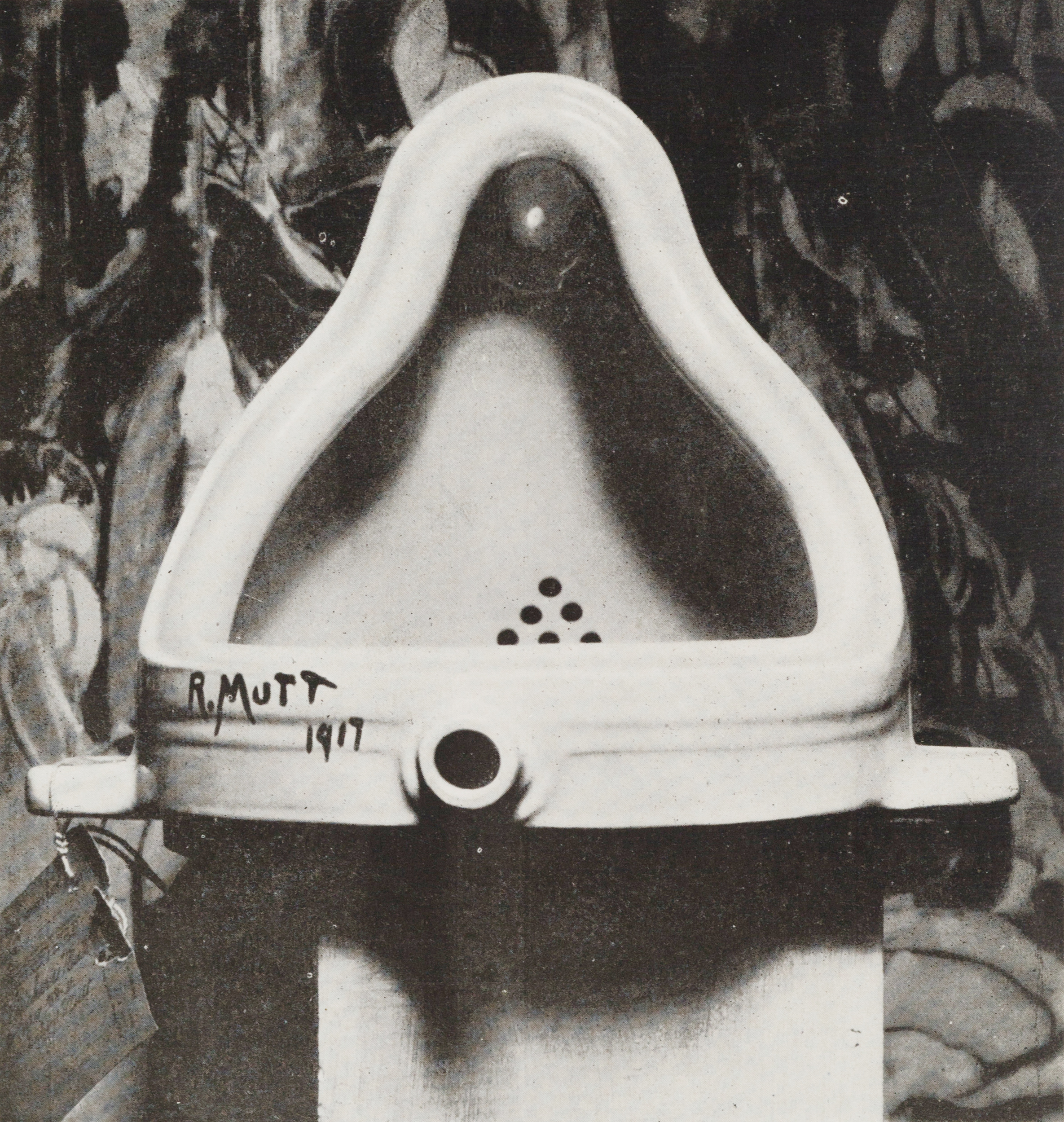
Fountain (1917), by Marcel Duchamp, a "shock art pioneer".

Shock art is contemporary art that incorporates disturbing imagery, sound or scents to create a shocking experience. It is a way to disturb "smug, complacent and hypocritical" people. While the art form's proponents argue that it is "imbedded with social commentary" and critics dismiss it as "cultural pollution", it is an increasingly marketable art, described by one art critic in 2001 as "the safest kind of art that an artist can go into the business of making today".

== History ==
While the movement has become increasingly mainstream, the roots of shock art run deep into art history; Royal Academy curator Norman Rosenthal noted in the catalog for the "shock art" exhibition Sensation in 1997 that artists have always been in the business of conquering "territory that hitherto has been taboo". In China, which experienced an active "shock art" movement following the Tiananmen Square protests of 1989, encroachment on the taboo has led the Ministry of Culture to attempt a crackdown on the artform, banning the use of corpses or body parts in art.

Similarly, philosopher Stephen Hicks describes shock art as the inevitable conclusion of trends initiated in the late 19th-century modernist art movement. Traditionally, art was usually intended to be a representation of reality and a celebration of human or natural beauty, but by the late 1800s modernists began questioning the boundaries of what constituted art. "[T]he first modernists of the late 1800s set themselves systematically to the project of isolating all the elements of art and eliminating them or flying in the face of them," often by portraying the world as "fractured, decaying, horrifying, depressing, empty, and ultimately unintelligible." The "grand-daddy" of this trend was Marcel Duchamp with his 1916 work Fountain, a urinal he signed and submitted to an art show. Similar works that broke with past aesthetic traditions include Edvard Munch's The Scream (1893) and Pablo Picasso's Les Demoiselles d'Avignon (1907). A parallel trend was "reductionism": emphasizing the basic elements of art such as colors or shapes, often in a manner that minimizes the need for artistic skill. Hicks cites White on White (1918) by Kazimir Malevich. A subsequent trend was using art as ironic or kitschy commentary: "if traditionally the art object is a special and unique artifact, then we can eliminate the art object's special status by making art works that are reproductions of excruciatingly ordinary objects", as with Andy Warhol's factory produced silk screens of consumer products. With a shift to post-modernist art in the 1970s and '80s, a preoccupation with politics, sex and scatology appears as with Piss Christ (1987) by Andres Serrano, and the performance art/punk rock musician GG Allin who became notorious for defecating on stage. "[W]e have reached a dead end: From Duchamp's Piss on art at the beginning of the century to Allin's Shit on you at the end—that is not a significant development over the course of a century."

In 1998, John Windsor in The Independent said that the work of the Young British Artists seemed tame compared with that of the "shock art" of the 1970s, including "kinky outrages" at the Nicholas Treadwell Gallery, amongst which were a "hanging, anatomically detailed leather straitjacket, complete with genitals", titled Pink Crucifixion, by Mandy Havers.

In the United States in 2008, a court case went to trial to determine whether the fetish films of Ira Isaacs constituted shock art, as the director claims, or unlawful obscenity. The court concluded that the films were indeed obscene, and Isaacs was sentenced to four years in prison.

== Select notable examples ==
- Fountain, a urinal placed on exhibit by Marcel Duchamp, a pioneer of the form, in 1917. In 2004, Fountain was selected in a survey of 500 artists and critics as "the most influential work of modern art".
- Artist's Shit, a 1961 artwork by Piero Manzoni, consists of 90 tin cans, each reportedly filled with 30 grams (1.1 oz) of Manzoni's faeces. A tin was sold for €124,000 at Sotheby's on May 23, 2007, and tin 54 was sold at Christies for £182,500 on October 16, 2015.
- Orgies of Mystery Theatre, by Hermann Nitsch, a display of music and dance in the midst of "dismembered animal corpses", at 1966's Destruction in Art Symposium.
- Shoot, a 1971 performance piece by Chris Burden in which a friend shot him in the arm with a .22 calibre gun from a distance of 3.5 metres (11 ft).
- The Dinner Party, a 1979 exhibit by Judy Chicago in which table place settings are set as for a dinner party of famous women. The piece was controversial and labeled shock art because of its inclusion of iconic "butterflies" at each setting representative of the vulva.
- Piss Christ, 1987, by Andres Serrano a photograph of a crucifix submerged in the artist's own urine.
- Artist Rick Gibson made a pair of earrings with freeze-dried human fetuses (Human Earrings, 1987), and ate a human testicle (A Cannibal in Vancouver, 1989) and proposed to make a diptych with a squashed rat (Sniffy the Rat, 1990).
- The Physical Impossibility of Death in the Mind of Someone Living (1991), a dead tiger shark preserved in a glass and steel tank of formaldehyde by Damien Hirst has been grouped in the category of shock art, but also criticised as an unoriginal product of "shock tactics" and not "real art".
- 12 Square Meters, a 1994 performance art display by Zhang Huan in Beijing wherein Huan "lathered his nude body in honey and fish oil" and exposed himself to "swarming flies and insects".
- In 1996, Gottfried Helnwein painted the Adoration of the Magi with Adolf Hitler as Baby Jesus, which was displayed at the State Russian Museum Saint Petersburg, the Legion of Honor, Fine Arts Museums of San Francisco, Denver Art Museum, Museum Ludwig and others.
- Myra (1995), a portrait of murderer Myra Hindley constructed of children's handprints, by Marcus Harvey.
- The Holy Virgin Mary, a black Virgin Mary, with elephant dung, before a background of pornography, by Chris Ofili.
- My Bed, a 1998 work by Tracey Emin consisting of the artist's bed covered with soiled bedsheets and surrounded by debris including menstrual-stained underwear.
- Helena: The Goldfish Blender, a 2000 display of live goldfish in blenders which viewers were invited to turn on, by Marco Evaristti.
- Fucking Hell, a 2008 sculpture by Jake and Dinos Chapman featuring nine nightmarish landscapes displaying thousands of hand-painted cast miniature figures of Nazis.
- In 2007, Mark McGowan ate a corgi in London to protest fox hunting by Prince Philip, Duke of Edinburgh.
- In 2008, during the elections for the US presidency, the artist Apollo Braun put on display in his then art gallery in New York City a t-shirt bearing the slogan "Who killed Obama?" and later on, a t-shirt bearing the slogan "Obama is my slave". The two of them shocked the public and brought death threats to the artist.
- Forget Me Knot: In 2012, Sruli Recht documented a one off surgery/performance during which a plastic surgeon removed a 110mm x 10mm strip of skin from his abdomen while he was awake. The piece of skin with the hair still attached was tanned and mounted to a 24kt gold ring.

== See also ==
- New Gothic
- Shock rock
- Transgressive art
- Industrial music
- Viennese Actionism
- Violence in art
- Günter Brus
- Joan Cornellà
- Rick Gibson
- Mary Kelly
- Robert Mapplethorpe
- Jonathan Meese
- Neck Face
- Raymond Pettibon
- Pierre Pinoncelli
- Dash Snow
- Tal R
- Abdul Vas
- Kara Walker
- Joel-Peter Witkin
