= United States v. Extreme Associates, Inc. =

2005 U.S. law case relating to obscenity

- Court: United States Court of Appeals for the Third Circuit
- Full case name: United States v. Extreme Associates, Inc.; Robert Zicari, aka Rob Black; Janet Romano, aka Lizzie Borden
- Argued: October 19, 2005
- Decided: December 8, 2005
- Citation: 431 F.3d 150 (3rd Cir. 2005)

Case opinions
- Majority: D. Brooks Smith, joined by Walter King Stapleton, Richard Lowell Nygaard
- Dissent: None

United States v. Extreme Associates, 431 F.3d 150 (3rd Cir. 2005), is a 2005 U.S. law case revolving around issues of obscenity. Extreme Associates, a pornography company owned by Rob Zicari and his wife Lizzy Borden (also known as Janet Romano), was prosecuted by the federal government for alleged distribution of obscenity across state lines. After several years of legal proceedings, the matter ended on March 11, 2009, with a plea agreement by Rob Zicari and Lizzy Borden.

== Leading up to the indictment ==
The filming of Lizzy Borden's movie Forced Entry, which included several simulated rapes, was covered in the PBS Frontline documentary American Porn, which aired on February 7, 2002; the makers of the documentary were repulsed and walked off the set. Zicari was interviewed in the documentary; he defended the company's content and challenged Attorney General John Ashcroft to take action against him. Zicari stated in an interview for the program, "We've got tons of stuff they technically could arrest us for. I'm not out there saying I want to be the test case. But I will be the test case. I would welcome that. I would welcome the publicity. I would welcome everything, to make a point in, I guess, our society". These scenes possibly led to the subsequent undercover operation by federal authorities.

On April 8, 2003, the premises of Extreme Associates were raided by federal agents, and five videos were seized. The United States Postal Inspection Service and the Pornography Unit of the Los Angeles Police Department's Organized Crime and Vice Division had conducted the investigation leading to the indictment. On September 5, 2002, a U.S. postal inspector had joined the Extreme website. Postal inspectors then viewed clips on the site, and ordered three videotapes which were sent to a postal agent in Pittsburgh. On August 6, 2003, Black, Borden and the company were indicted by a federal grand jury in Pittsburgh on ten counts of the production and distribution by mail and the Internet of obscene pornographic materials. Zicari and Romano faced a maximum total sentence of fifty years in prison, a fine of $2,500,000, or both. Extreme Associates, Inc. faced a maximum total sentence of a term of probation of fifty years and a fine of $5,000,000. The prosecution also sought forfeiture of the films charged in the indictment, all gross profits from the distribution of the films, and all property used to facilitate the alleged crimes, including the domain name extremeassociates.com. At the time it was the first major federal obscenity prosecution in ten years.

Zicari's company is located in North Hollywood near Los Angeles. However, the indictment and trial took place in the Western District of Pennsylvania, from where undercover agents had ordered the offending materials, and video clips had been downloaded. Extreme also posted videotapes and DVDs to a distributor in the district. It has been alleged the authorities chose this area of Pennsylvania because they believed a conviction for obscenity would be easier to achieve in that socially conservative district than in California, as a jury would be more likely to agree the material offended the standards of its local community, which is part of the Miller Test used to judge obscenity in the U.S.

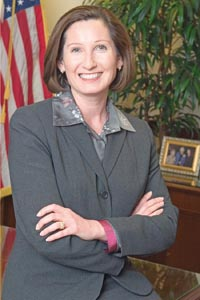
Mary Beth Buchanan

The trial has been seen as a test case of the acceptable limits of pornography. Mary Beth Buchanan was the federal prosecutor in the case. In an interview on 60 Minutes she said, "We have just had a proliferation of this type of material that has been getting increasingly worse and worse. And that's why it's important to enforce the law, and to show the producers that there are limits. There are limits to what they can sell and distribute throughout the country." Ms. Buchanan has also stated that "The lack of enforcement of federal obscenity laws during the 1990s has led to a proliferation of obscenity throughout the United States, such as the violent and degrading material charged in this case." Buchanan has said that Zicari's comments on the Frontline program "helped us to determine that this was not a producer who was trying to comply with the law".

Zicari remained in business during the trial; he continued to market and sell the five tapes that are at the center of the prosecution as The Federal Five, with a portion of the sales price going to his defense fund. Buyers of those materials do not break the law, since mere private possession of obscenity (unlike production and distribution) is legal. The involved movies are

- Extreme Teen 24: contains a scene of a naive supposed young girl being talked into having sex by an older man. The actress involved was over 18 but was dressed and acted like a young underage girl.
- Cocktails 2: various scenes of women drinking vomit, saliva and other bodily fluids. It was the director's cut version of the film that was cited in the case.
- Ass Clowns 3: a female journalist is being raped by a gang led by Osama bin Laden; the journalist is freed and the gang members killed. The director's cut version also contains a scene where Jesus steps off the cross and has sex with an angel.
- 1001 Ways to Eat My Jizz: Described on IMDb as eleven women performing oral sex on men and eating foods covered in semen. The film could be considered obscene because it appeals to a prurient interest, and the literary or otherwise socially seeming value is questionable.
- Forced Entry: The film depicts the beating, rape and murder of women by a serial killer, who is eventually killed by a mob of vigilantes. There are three scenes which graphically portray rape and murder, and women are also spat on. Extreme's website called it their "most controversial movie" and "a stunningly disturbing look at a serial killer, satanic rituals, and the depths of human depravity". Forced Entry was directed by Lizzy Borden and released in 2002. Again, it was the director's cut version of the film that was cited in the case.

The prosecution also charged the defendants with transmitting six obscene video clips over the Internet through the extremeassociates.com website. The six video clips were entitled "valeriejospit", "jewel", "PZ Summer Breeze", "dp-gangbang-7gen-X", "miacum" and "analasspirations1", and ranged in length from 37 seconds to two minutes, 54 seconds.

The early developments in the case were covered in the 2004 TV documentary The Porn King Versus the President.

== Initial successful motion ==
During a hearing in November 2004, Zicari's lawyer, H. Louis Sirkin, argued that the right to privacy, recently confirmed and strengthened in Lawrence v. Texas, gave individuals the constitutional right to view offending materials in private, a right which cannot be meaningfully exercised without a corresponding right of companies to distribute such materials. The prosecution countered that an individual's right to privacy is unrelated to a company's right to commercial distribution.

The defense moved to dismiss the indictments on the grounds that federal obscenity statutes violated the constitutional guarantees of privacy and liberty that were protected by the due process clause. Referencing Lawrence v. Texas and Stanley v. Georgia, the defense argued there is a fundamental right to sexual privacy which includes the right to possess and view sexually explicit material in one's own home. The defense argued that this right was not affected by the fact that the material does not have any literary or artistic merit, and that since the federal obscenity laws imposed a complete ban on materials which people have the right to possess, they were unconstitutional.

On January 20, 2005, District Court Judge Gary L. Lancaster dropped the charges, agreeing with the defense that the federal anti-obscenity statutes were unconstitutional, as they violated a person's fundamental right to possess and view whatever they want in the privacy of their own home. As a fundamental right had been violated, the government had to establish that a compelling state interest was involved. The prosecution argued that the government had a legitimate interest in protecting adults from unwitting exposure to obscenity, and protecting children from exposure to obscenity. These arguments were rejected by the court, which also ruled that the federal obscenity laws were not narrow enough to meet these interests, and could not justify a complete ban on obscene material. Lancaster ruled that children and unwitting adults are protected from the content because the website requires a credit card to join, and because software is available by which parents can restrict children's access to Internet pornography. The court did agree with the government that Lawrence had not created a new broad fundamental right to engage in any private sexual conduct. Instead the court relied on Stanley, which had established there was a fundamental right to private possession of obscene material. The court did rely on Lawrence for its assertion that the government could not use public morality as a legitimate state interest which justified the infringement of consensual, adult, private sexual conduct. The court also made reference to the dissenting opinion of Justice Scalia, who said that Lawrence had questioned the validity of U.S. obscenity laws, since the government could not enforce a moral code of conduct. Judge Lancaster also cited numerous constitutional scholars who had observed that the Lawrence ruling calls federal obscenity laws into question.

Judge Lancaster wrote:

Courts use one of two tests to assess the constitutionality of statutes that are faced with a substantive due process challenge: the strict scrutiny test or the rational basis test. Therefore, we must first determine which test should be applied in this case.

Where the law restricts the exercise of a fundamental right, we apply the strict scrutiny test. Under the strict scrutiny test, a statute withstands a substantive due process challenge only if the state identifies a compelling state interest that is advanced by a statute that is narrowly drawn to serve that interest in the least restrictive way possible. In other words, even if the government has a state interest that rises to the level of being compelling, if there is a less restrictive way to advance it, the statute fails this test.

Where it is not a fundamental right that is restricted, we apply the rational basis test. Under the rational basis test, a statute withstands a substantive due process challenge if the government identifies a legitimate state interest that the legislature could reasonably conclude was served by the statute. It is not enough under the rational basis test, however, for the government to simply announce some theoretical and noble purpose behind the statute. Rather, the statute must reasonably advance that purpose in order for the statute to survive even this deferential test.

Because the [Lawrence] case involved two consenting adults engaged in sexual activity in the privacy of their own home and not minors, persons who might be coerced or injured, public conduct, or prostitution, the Court found that no state interest – including promoting a moral code – could justify the law's intrusion into the personal and private life of the individuals involved.

In a dissenting opinion joined by Chief Justice Rehnquist and Justice Thomas, Justice Scalia opined that the holding in Lawrence calls into question the constitutionality of the nation's obscenity laws, among many other laws based on the state's desire to establish a 'moral code' of conduct. It is reasonable to assume that these three members of the Court came to this conclusion only after reflection and that the opinion was not merely a result of over-reactive hyperbole by those on the losing side of the argument.

— Judge Lancaster, in U.S. v. Extreme Associates, Inc. (citations omitted)

== Appeal by the Department of Justice ==
The Department of Justice, then headed by Alberto Gonzales, announced on February 16, 2005, that it would appeal the ruling. That appeal was filed with the Third Circuit Court of Appeals on April 11, 2005, argued on October 19, 2005, and decided on December 8, 2005.

The appeals court reversed the lower court and reinstated the suit against Zicari and Romano, ruling that the lower court had erred in setting aside the federal obscenity statutes, which had been repeatedly upheld in Supreme Court decisions. The appeals court pointed to previous Supreme Court opinions stating that the right to decide whether a subsequent Supreme Court ruling invalidates an earlier one belongs to the Supreme Court alone, not to a lower court.

The ruling concluded, "we have declined to equate the privacy of the home ... with a 'zone of privacy' that follows a distributor or a consumer of obscene materials wherever he goes", and concluded that precedent had not in fact been overturned by the Lawrence ruling, and the trial judge had erred in law to state they had. Only the Supreme Court could say if their own prior decisions had been overturned, and they had reserved that right to themselves in past cases.

Furthermore, with regards to whether or not the fact of the Internet delivery made the community standards test inapplicable, the ruling argued, "The mere fact, without more, that the instant prosecution involves Internet transmissions is not enough to render an entire line of Supreme Court decisions inapplicable given their analytical and other factual similarities to this case."

The couple's attorney subsequently filed a petition asking the U.S. Supreme Court to hear the case. The petition, however, was denied.

== New trial ==
Following the Supreme Court's denial of the petition, the case was sent back to the district court.

As stated in several adult trade publications including AVN, due to the company's economic failing, Zicari and his wife decided that they were not able to retain the legal counsel needed to successfully fight the reinstated charges with a lengthy court fight. Several attorneys involved with the case denied their lack of interest to represent Zicari. However, none of these same lawyers stated they would engage in a long-term trial pro bono when asked.

On March 11, 2009, Extreme Associates and its owners pleaded guilty to the reinstated obscenity charges to avoid trial, effectively shutting down the company. Extreme Associates also apparently took its website down concurrent with the plea.

The couple was sentenced on July 1, 2009, to one year and one day in prison. In late September, they began serving their prison sentences, Zicari at La Tuna Federal Correctional Institution in Texas and Romano at Waseca Federal Correctional Institution in Minnesota.

== Legal aspects and implications ==
Quotations from the appellate ruling:

[The] Supreme Court explicitly admonished lower courts that "[i]f a precedent of this Court has direct application in a case, yet appears to rest on reasons rejected in some other line of decisions, the Court of Appeals should follow the case which directly controls, leaving to this Court the prerogative of overruling its own decisions ... even as the [Supreme] Court in Agostini concluded that its own adherence to the old precedent "would undoubtedly work a 'manifest injustice'" in light of later decisions, it emphasized that "the trial court acted within its discretion in entertaining the motion [requesting relief under the newer cases] with supporting allegations, but it was also correct to recognize that the motion had to be denied unless and until this [Supreme] Court reinterpreted the binding precedent."

— United States v. Extreme Associates, para. 17 (emphasis in original)

"[The] right to receive is not a right to the existence of modes of distribution of obscenity, which the State could destroy without serious risk of infringing on the privacy of a man's thoughts; rather, it is a right to a protective zone ensuring the freedom of a man’s inner life..."

— United States v. Extreme Associates, para. 21 (emphasis in original; quoting from United States v. Thirty-seven Photographs)

In Orito, for example, the defendant was prosecuted under § 1462 for privately transporting obscene material in interstate commerce (to wit, knowingly carrying obscene materials in his private luggage on a domestic commercial flight). Orito "moved to dismiss the indictment on the ground that the statute violated both his First and Ninth Amendment rights." In dismissing the indictment, the Supreme Court explained that the District Court had misinterpreted not only Stanley, but also Griswold to establish constitutional protection for the non-public transportation of obscene material.

— United States v. Extreme Associates, para. 24 (citation omitted)

We conclude that the Supreme Court has analyzed and upheld the federal statutes regulating the distribution of obscenity under the constitutional right to privacy embodied collectively in the First, Ninth, and Fourteenth (thus also the Fifth) Amendments, as well as the Griswold line of decisions that the District Court asserted should control this case. The fact that such analysis has never been applied within the precise scenario outlined by the District Court – i.e., use of the talismanic phrase "substantive due process" in the context of a vendor proceeding under derivative standing on behalf of a consumer's right to privately possess obscene material – does not negate the binding precedential value of the Supreme Court cases employing that analysis. The Court's analysis need not be so specific in order to limit a district court's prerogative to overturn an entire category of federal statutes, even as applied to particular defendants, based on speculation about a later decision that fails even to mention those statutes. The Court has considered the federal statutes regulating the distribution of obscenity in the context of the broader constitutional right to privacy and upheld them. That such analysis was conducted absent its constitutional brand name does not negate its precedential value.

— United States v. Extreme Associates, para. 32

It was therefore impermissible for the District Court to strike down the statutes at issue based on speculation that Orito and other pivotal obscenity cases "appear[] to rest on reasons rejected in" Lawrence. Even if there were analytical merit to such speculation, an issue on which we do not opine, the constraint on lower courts remains the same. The possibility that Lawrence has "somehow weakened the precedential value of" the Reidel line of cases is irrelevant for purposes of ruling on the instant indictment.

— United States v. Extreme Associates, para. 40 (citation omitted)

== See also ==
- Rob Zicari
- Obscenity
- Lawrence v. Texas 539 U.S. 558 (2003)
- Ashcroft v. Free Speech Coalition 535 U.S. 234 (2002)
- Miller v. California 413 U.S. 15 (1975)
- United States v. Dost 636 F. Supp. 828 (S.D. Cal. 1986)
- Max Hardcore
- Ira Isaacs
- John Stagliano
