= Rob Zicari =

American pornographer

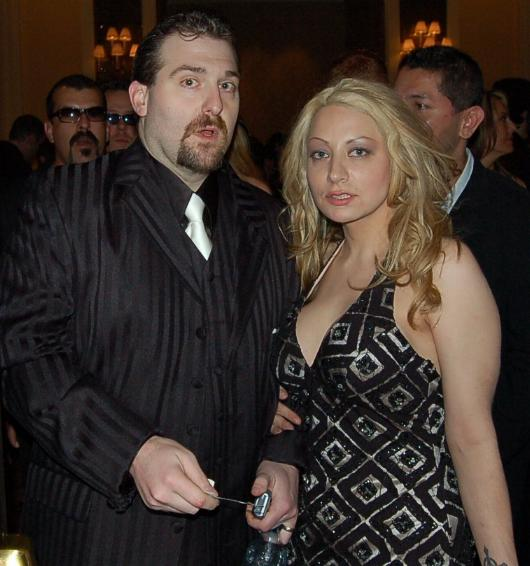
- Rob Zicari and his then-wife Lizzy Borden in 2006
- Born: Robert D. Zicari; August 5, 1974 (age 51); Rochester, New York, U.S.
- Other name: Rob Black
- Occupations: Entrepreneur, professional wrestling promoter, Founder/Co-owner of Extreme Associates, podcaster
- Spouses: Lizzy Borden (m. 2001; div. 2013) Katie Summers (m. 2013)

Robert D. Zicari (born August 5, 1974), also known as Rob Black, is an American pornographer, entrepreneur, podcaster and professional wrestling promoter. Together with his then-wife Janet "Lizzy Borden" Romano, he owned the porn company Extreme Associates. Zicari was prosecuted for distribution of obscenity by the United States Department of Justice in 2004. The case was dismissed but was reinstated upon appeal in 2005. Zicari entered into a plea agreement with the government in 2009, ending the case.

== Career ==
Zicari became a porn director in the mid-1990s. His former porn company Extreme Video was started in 1993/1994. In 1998, he founded the porn company, Extreme Associates, together with fellow porn directors Tom Byron and Van Damage and porn star Tiffany Mynx (who have since left the company). Janet Romano started to work for him in the same year, first as an actress and then as a director. His work often involved scenes considered egregious and extreme even by other members of the pornography industry, such as adult performers acting as young girls, or a simulated rape of a disabled person in a wheelchair in Miscreants (1997).

Black appeared as himself in the documentary film Sex: The Annabel Chong Story (1999). Beginning in 2000, Zicari and AVN Magazine engaged in a "propaganda war" against one another, and as a result, Black's products were not reviewed or advertised in that trade magazine for several years.

In 2001, Zicari (as Rob Black) unsuccessfully ran for mayor of Los Angeles, receiving 789 votes.

Zicari owns and operates the American Cheeseburger restaurant. In addition, Zicari owns and operates Extreme Gifts, a store specializing in adult and marijuana products.

== Obscenity prosecution ==
The filming of Lizzy Borden's movie Forced Entry, which included several simulated rapes, was covered in the PBS Frontline documentary American Porn (2002); the makers of the documentary were repulsed and walked off the set. The filming of the movie was also a part of documentary produced for BBC 2 hosted by Louis Theroux which follows various figures of the porn industry. Theroux also leaves the set in a similar manner to that of the PBS documentary. After, Zicari was interviewed in the documentary and challenged Attorney General John Ashcroft. These scenes possibly led to the subsequent undercover operation by federal authorities.

In April 2003, the premises of Extreme Associates were raided by federal agents. Zicari, his then wife Lizzy Borden and his company were indicted for distributing obscene pornographic materials. The case is United States v. Extreme Associates.

Zicari's company is located in Northridge near Los Angeles, but the trial took place in Pittsburgh, from where under-cover agents had ordered the offending materials.

Zicari remained in business during the trial; he continued to market and sell the five tapes that are at the center of the prosecution as The Federal Five, with a portion of the sales price going to his defense fund. Note that buyers of those materials do not break the law, since mere possession of obscenity (unlike production and distribution) is not illegal.

In April 2004, Zicari engaged in a public dispute with fellow pornographer Larry Flynt, who also had to fight various obscenity trials in the past. Zicari asked the adult industry for financial support to aid in his defense; Flynt declined, saying that he only promotes consensual sex and that Zicari's actions harmed the industry as a whole.

Zicari's lawyer H. Louis Sirkin initially argued that laws against the distribution of obscenity were unconstitutional since people have a right to own obscenity, but this argument was rebuffed on appeal.

After six years of legal costs, Black and his wife both pleaded guilty to the reinstated federal obscenity charges in hopes to avoid more extensive loss and penalties if they lost at actual trial.

Zicari and his wife were both sentenced to one year and one day in prison on July 1, 2009. In late September the couple began serving their prison sentences, Zicari at La Tuna Federal Correctional Institution in Texas and his wife at Waseca Federal Correctional Institution in Minnesota. Instead of reporting to the intended minimum-security satellite facility, Zicari mistakenly reported to the prison's primary facility, where officials placed him in solitary confinement for nearly a month because it "was the only space they had available". In March 2013, Zicari revealed on his radio show, The Rob Black Show, that he was actually placed in solitary because he was mistakenly designated as a sex offender because of the obscenity charges.

== Xtreme Pro Wrestling ==
In 1999, Zicari and Tom Byron founded the XPW professional wrestling promotion. He appeared on shows as the owner as well as a manager under the name of Rob Black. His heel (bad guy) stable was called the "Black Army" and featured wrestlers such as John Kronus, Terry Funk, Abdullah the Butcher, and Juventud Guerrera. XPW folded in 2003 because of issues related to the obscenity prosecution, and in 2004 Zicari sold the company's footage to Xtreme Entertainment Group. In 2012, Zicari regained control and ownership of XPW. Zicari relaunched XPW in 2021, after Dark Side of the Ring aired its XPW episode in Season 3.

== The Rob Black Show ==
In March 2013, Zicari launched The Rob Black Show on Blog Talk Radio. The Daily Beast called him "Porn's Dirty Whistleblower" for revealing unsafe practices on set, business arrangements that exploit performers and common sidelines such as porn talent agents working their charges on escort sites.
