= Marco Evaristti =

Chilean artist

Marco Evaristti (born 1963) is a Chilean artist who has lived in Denmark since the 1980s. While a trained and practicing architect, he is best known for hosting a dinner party where the main course was agnolotti pasta that was topped with a meatball made with his own fat, removed earlier in the year in a liposuction operation.

== Early life ==
Though raised a Catholic, in his teenage years Evaristti found out he was born to a Jewish mother, which some account for the philosophical and religious themes in his work. Evaristti holds a master's degree in architecture from the Royal Danish Academy of Fine Arts where he was a student of architect Henning Larsen. Through the years, he has continued working on private architectural projects as well as larger commission projects.

== Architecture ==
His architecture works contain a blend of Scandinavian, Asian and Latin American approaches. He travels to other countries and embellishes the natural environment with colored dye as part of an ongoing project he calls "Pink State". Evaristti sometimes uses materials taken from nature, such as diamonds, gold, semen and blood, to create a psychological reaction in the viewer.

=== Pink State ===
Evaristti describes Pink State as his own independent state, a state of mind with passport and constitution, but without government control. Although imaginary, he will materialize it from time to time in his transitory landscape works. Pink State is Evaristti's, but without controlled or controlling borders. Manifestations of Pink State have included 2004's The Ice Cube Project off Greenland, 2007's attempted painting of the summit of Mont Blanc (The Mont Rouge Project) in France, and 2008's Arido Rosso Project in the Sahara. All these projects, at their core, deal with issues of territorial power and brotherhood.

== Works ==
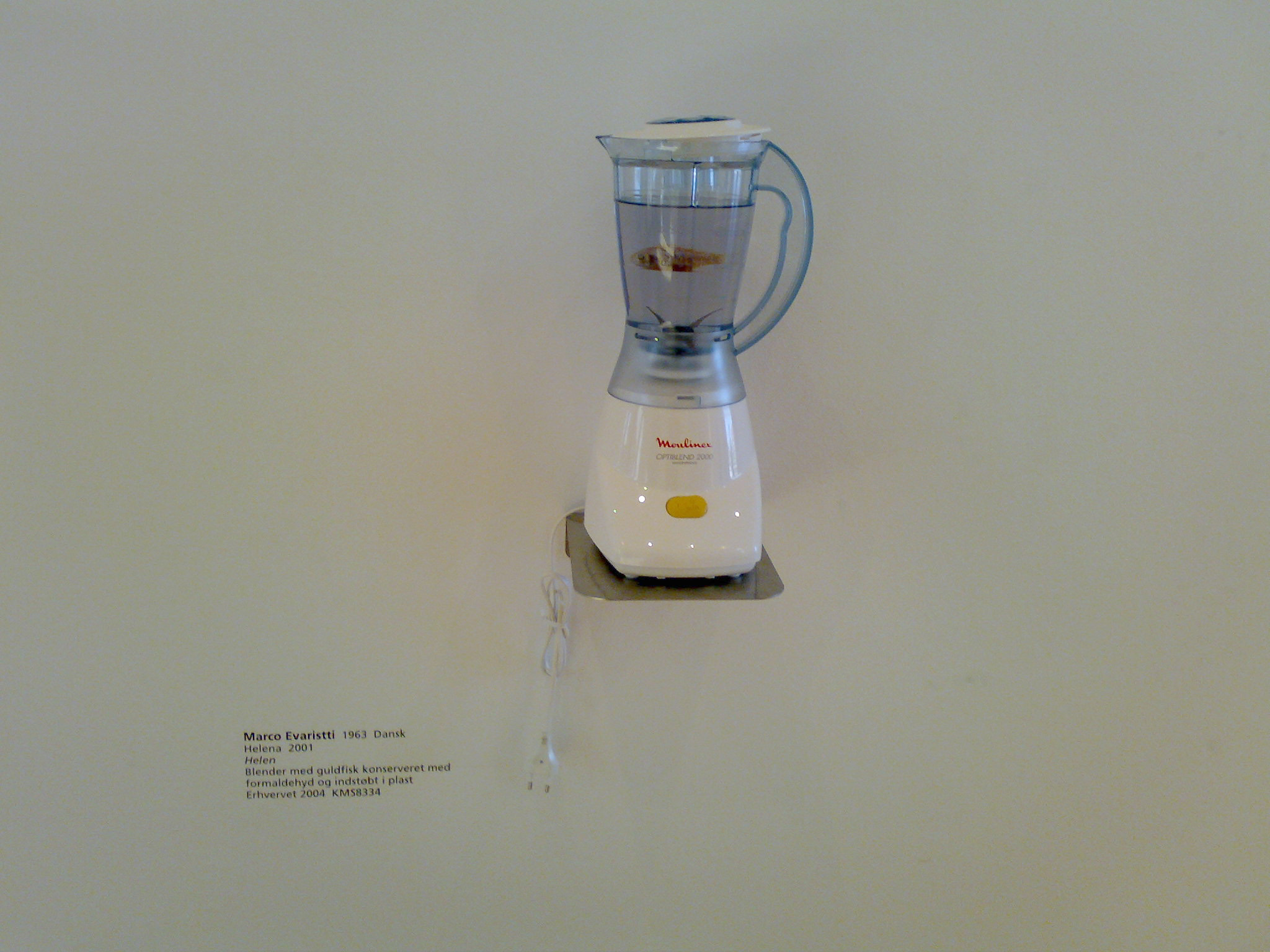
A version of Helena on display in Trapholt

In 1995, Evaristti was a visiting professor in Bangkok at the Silipakorn Fine Arts University. While in Bangkok, he witnessed over thirty road casualties every day, and accompanied investigators to several accidents. Here he acquired blood and other materials from some of the scenes, and used them with ink to paint on canvases. In this way, he was trying to create an image of what disaster might look like. The most important element was the use of real blood. Evaristti quoted Picasso that art is a representation of reality expressed through a lie. However, in these paintings the blood is real and thus not a lie. He titled the piece "Crash".

After studying at the Royal Danish Academy of Fine Arts, Evaristti gained notoriety for a museum display entitled Helena in 2000 that featured ten functional blenders containing live goldfish. The display, at the Trapholt Art Museum in Kolding, Denmark, invited guests to turn on the blenders. This led to museum director Peter Meyers being charged with and, later, acquitted of animal cruelty.

In 2001, Evaristti worked on his project "Terrorialista", which is a silver-patina bronze sculpture made up of twenty-eight parts that together form a complete human body. The pieces are all based on photographic images of human bodies that were blown apart by acts of terror by both sides of the conflict. The allegiances, gender, nationality, religion and every other feature that had identified the people in those photographs was now eradicated. Parts of this work are further explained in the Pink State.

Evaristti's next major work, in 2004, entitled Ice Cube Project, was to paint the exposed tip of a small iceberg red. This took place on March 24, in Kangia fjord near Ilullissat, Greenland. With two icebreakers and a twenty-man crew, Evaristti used three fire hoses and 3,000 liters (790 US gallons) of paint to color the iceberg blood-red. The artist commented that, "We all have a need to decorate Mother Nature because it belongs to all of us."

On January 13, 2007, Evaristti hosted a dinner party where the main course was agnolotti pasta that was topped with a meatball made with his own fat, removed earlier in the year in a liposuction operation.

On June 8, 2007, Evaristti draped the peak of Mont Blanc at the border between Italy and France with red fabric, along with a 20-foot pole with a flag reading "Pink State". He had been arrested and detained on June 6 for attempting to paint the peak red. He has stated that his aim is to raise awareness of environmental degradation.

In 2009, Evaristti exhibited his "Body Bags" project. This consisted of three body bags cast in bronze, each in a different color, to symbolize the three main monotheistic religions. He claimed the body bags were like the modern-day image of the skull and reminded people how fragile human life was. By making each resemble a different religion, he was trying to enforce the idea that no matter what ideas you believe in, your life will still end in death.

On January 27, 2010, Evaristti exhibited his artwork "Rolexgate" which is a model of the entrance gate to the Auschwitz-Birkenau concentration camp. 80% of the model is made up of gold which comes from the teeth of Jews who died in the concentration camps. The model had been briefly exhibited in Berlin, but was removed because of the audience reaction.

In 2010, Evaristti created his "Boxing Bag" project, in which he replaced boxing bags' sand stuffing with hair cut from Christians, Jews, and Muslims. He invited viewers to nudge certain bags aside to get through the pathway. He suggested that a viewer who hit certain bags had a vendetta against that religion.

In March 2013, Evaristti painted a frozen waterfall in Hovden, Aust-Agder, Norway red with fruit juice.

In November 2022, Evaristti had his first solo show in Thailand at West Eden in conjunction with a concurrent show in Copenhagen with Galleri Christoffer Egelund.

In March 2025, as part of an art exhibition, "And Now You Care", three piglets were meant to starve to death as a statement to raise awareness of mass animal slaughter, and the deaths of 25,000 piglets everyday as a result of Denmark's meat industry. The stunt was criticized by animal rights groups, such as Animal Protection Denmark. The piglets were stolen by animal rights activists with assistance from Evaristti's friend Caspar Steffensen before they could starve. Evaristti was initially disappointed, but later said: "But then I thought about it for a few hours and realized that at least this way the piglets would have a happy life."

== See also ==
- List of incidents of cannibalism
- Shock art
