= Ira Isaacs =

American film director

Ira E. Isaacs (born 1951) is an American pornographic film director and self-described "shock artist." He was convicted of five federal counts of selling and distributing obscene material in 2012.

== Life and career ==
Isaacs was born in the South Bronx and attended Taft High School. Isaacs graduated the State University of New York in 1977. Isaacs does business as Stolen Car Films, LA Media and scatmovies.com, according to the United States Department of Justice (USDOJ).

=== Federal obscenity trials ===
==== 2008 trial ====
In 2008 Isaacs was brought to trial in Los Angeles, California on federal obscenity charges for videos featuring scatology and bestiality. At issue were obscene films sold between May 2004 and October 2006: Gang Bang Horse "Pony Sex Game," Mako's First Time Scat, Hollywood Scat Amateurs No. 7, and BAE 20 (also titled Avantgarde Extreme). The prosecution alleged that the films are obscene, and have no artistic merit. Isaacs claimed the films have both artistic and political value.

The USDOJ Obscenity Prosecution Task Force initiated prosecution on this case. The Bush administration formed the task force to investigate pornography at the urging of social conservative groups. On June 11, it was discovered that the son of the judge presiding over the case, Alex Kozinski, had posted controversial material to his own website, prompting the suspension of the case. Kozinski declared a mistrial on June 13.

==== Double jeopardy motion ====
The Department of Justice filed to retry Isaacs on the same charges which prompted Isaacs to file a motion on double jeopardy. Isaacs’ motion was heard on September 8, 2008. Isaacs lost that hearing in the lower court and appealed to the 9th Circuit Court of Appeals. On December 22, 2009, the 9th Circuit decided against the artist's bid for his double jeopardy motion. On June 28, 2010, the Supreme Court of the United States denied hearing Isaacs' double jeopardy motion.

==== Further charges, retrial and conviction ====
Isaacs' second trial was initially set to be heard beginning May 17, 2011 but was delayed when prosecutors added further charges. The new indictment included three more charges relating to the sale and shipment of Hollywood Scat Amateurs No. 7, as well as charges regarding four new videos, Hollywood Scat Amateurs No. 38, Trailers, Japanese Doggie 3 Way, and Hollywood Scat Amateurs No. 10. In June Isaacs' attorneys filed a motion to strike evidence suggesting Isaacs' provided controlled substances to the actresses in his films to compel them to perform. The case was presented to a jury in March 2012. A mistrial was declared on March 6, 2012, after jurors deadlocked on the charges. According to Isaacs, jurors voted 10–2 against him. The third trial in April 2012 resulted in convictions on all five federal counts of selling and distributing obscene material. Isaacs was sentenced to four years in prison in January 2013. On March 25, 2014, the United States Court of Appeals for the Ninth Circuit rejected Isaacs' appeal of his conviction. After serving 26 months at the Federal Correctional Institution, La Tuna in Anthony, Texas, Isaacs was released to a halfway house on September 14, 2016, Isaacs was released on March 8, 2017. He is reportedly writing a book on his three trials and his time in prison called OBSCENE—The People vs. Ira Isaacs, due to be released in 2019.

== See also ==
- Max Hardcore
- United States v. Extreme Associates, Inc.
- John Stagliano
