= Alex Kozinski =

American retired federal judge (born 1950)

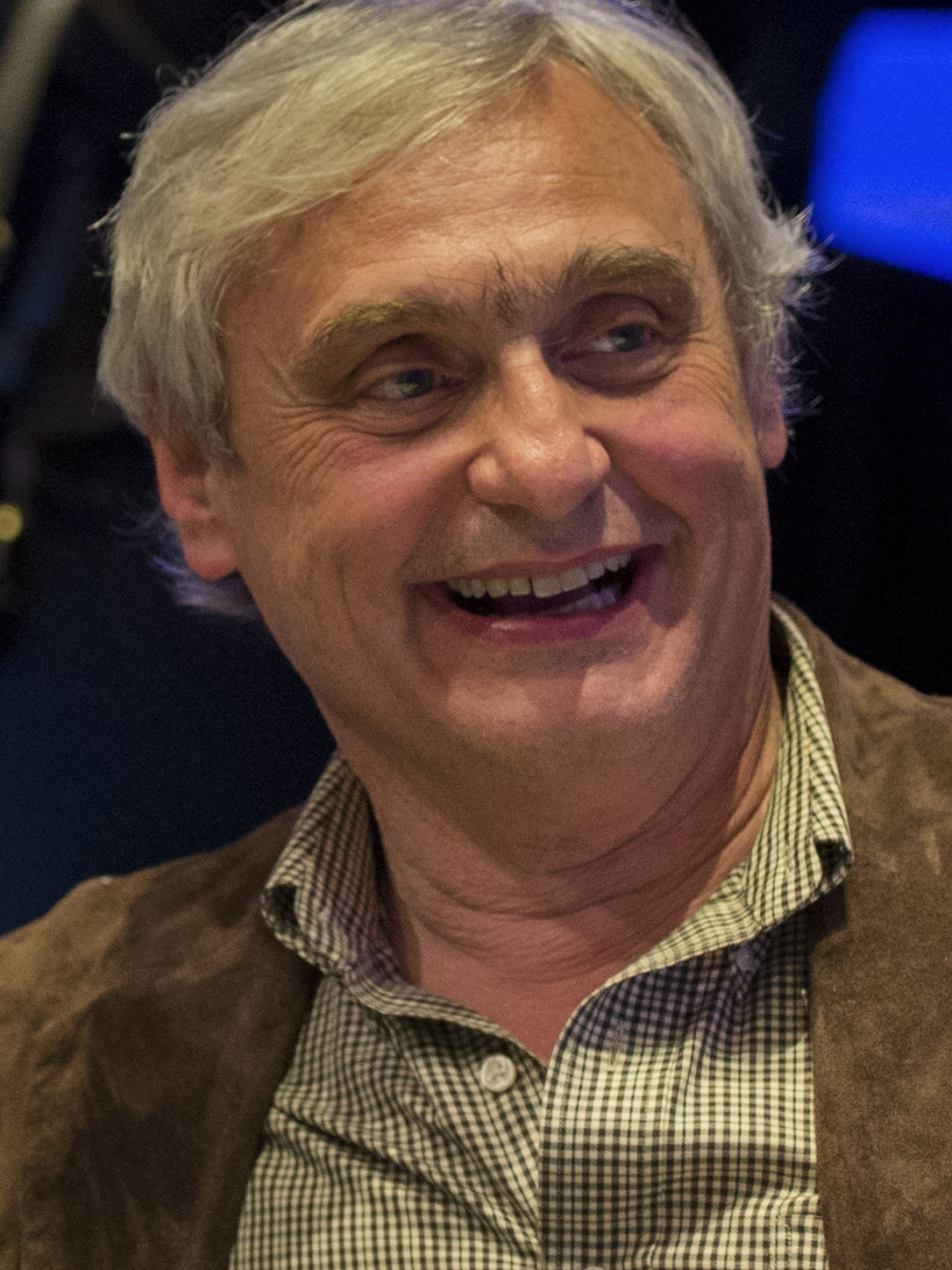
- Kozinski in 2024

Chief Judge of the United States Court of Appeals for the Ninth Circuit
- In office December 1, 2007 – December 1, 2014
- Preceded by: Mary M. Schroeder
- Succeeded by: Sidney R. Thomas

Judge of the United States Court of Appeals for the Ninth Circuit
- In office November 7, 1985 – December 18, 2017
- Appointed by: Ronald Reagan
- Preceded by: Seat established
- Succeeded by: Daniel Bress

Chief Judge of the United States Claims Court
- In office October 1, 1982 – February 9, 1985
- Preceded by: Position established
- Succeeded by: Loren A. Smith

Judge of the United States Claims Court
- In office October 1, 1982 – February 9, 1985
- Appointed by: Ronald Reagan
- Preceded by: Seat established
- Succeeded by: Marian Blank Horn

Personal details
- Born: July 23, 1950 (age 76) Bucharest, Romania
- Spouse: Marcy Tiffany
- Children: 3
- Education: University of California, Los Angeles (BA, JD)

Alex Kozinski (/kəˈzɪnski/; born July 23, 1950) is a Romanian-American jurist and lawyer who was a judge on the U.S. Court of Appeals for the Ninth Circuit from 1985 to 2017. He was a prominent and influential judge, and many of his law clerks went on to clerk for U.S. Supreme Court justices.

Kozinski's judicial career ended in 2017 when he retired after more than a dozen of his former female law clerks and legal staffers accused him of sexual harassment and abusive practices. Kozinski had previously faced an ethics hearing over inappropriate sexual material.

== Early life ==
Kozinski was born on July 23, 1950, to a Romanian Jewish family in Bucharest, under the rule of the Romanian People's Republic. Both of his parents were Holocaust survivors. Kozinski's father, Moses, spent four years in Transnistrian concentration camps where tens of thousands of Jews perished. His mother, Sabine, lived through the war years in a Romanian ghetto.

In 1958, Kozinski's parents applied to the Romanian government for permission to emigrate from the country. They received permission four years later in 1962, when Kozinski was 12 years old. Kozinski, who had grown up as a committed communist in Bucharest, became what he described as "an instant capitalist" when he took his first trip outside of the Iron Curtain, to Vienna, where he partook of such luxuries as chewing gum and bananas. Kozinski later recounted:

I remember leaving Romania, December 24, 1961. And I still remember being on the train, making plans for myself, how I would to go the West where people were oppressed and I would share my knowledge of Communism and help bring enlightenment by helping to tear down capitalism. ... And the next thing I remember, I was in Vienna, and I got bubblegum and chocolate, which were freely available. It was as though a cloud or veil had lifted. It was such a different world, you had real consumer goods. People weren't running around with shackles. Everything that had been said about the West was untrue. Bananas were plentiful. In Romania, my father used to have to work a half-day to get three bananas. I remember going with my parents to an open-air market in Vienna and seeing all these bananas, cheap, ... and wondering whether they would be there tomorrow. I looked a week later and they were still there. There was no conscious rethinking or recalculating my point of view. I was now an instant and fervent capitalist.

Kozinski's family immigrated to the United States in 1962 and settled in the Los Feliz neighborhood of Los Angeles, where his father ran a small grocery store.

== Education and early career ==
Kozinski studied economics at the University of California, Los Angeles, graduating in 1972 with a Bachelor of Arts, cum laude. He then attended the UCLA School of Law, where he was a managing editor of the UCLA Law Review. He graduated in 1975 with a Juris Doctor ranked first in his class.

After law school, Kozinski clerked for judge (later Supreme Court justice) Anthony Kennedy of the U.S. Court of Appeals for the Ninth Circuit from 1975 to 1976, then for chief justice Warren Burger of the U.S. Supreme Court from 1976 to 1977. He then entered private practice as an associate with the law firms Forry, Golbert, Singer & Gelles from 1977 to 1979 and Covington & Burling from 1979 to 1981. He was a Deputy Legal Counsel of the Office of the President-Elect in Washington, D.C. (1980–81) and an Assistant Counsel for the Office of Counsel to the President in Washington, D.C. (1981). He was a Special Counsel for the Merit Systems Protection Board in Washington, D.C. (1981–82).

=== Office of Special Counsel incident ===
While he was in the Office of Special Counsel, despite staff recommendations against termination, Kozinski overruled his staff and then repeatedly tutored Interior Secretary James G. Watt's legal staff in how to rewrite the proposed termination of a mining safety whistleblower so as to pass legal muster. When the incident came to light years later during confirmation hearings for Kozinski's Ninth Circuit Court of Appeals nomination, the scandal drew 43 Senate opposition votes and reportedly subsequently prevented Kozinski's planned promotion to the U.S. Supreme Court.

== Federal judicial service ==
Kozinski served as a trial judge of the United States Court of Claims in 1982, serving as Chief of Trial Division that year.

Kozinski was nominated by President Ronald Reagan on August 10, 1982, to the United States Claims Court, to a new seat authorized by 96 Stat. 27. He was confirmed by the United States Senate on August 20, 1982, and received commission on October 1, 1982. He served as Chief Judge from 1982 to 1985. His service terminated on February 9, 1985, due to resignation.

Kozinski was nominated by President Reagan on June 5, 1985, to the United States Court of Appeals for the Ninth Circuit, to a new seat created by 98 Stat. 333. Before the confirmation vote took place, former employees from Kozinski's time at the Office of Special Counsel warned the Senate that Kozinski was "harsh, cruel, demeaning, sadistic, disingenuous and without compassion." He was nonetheless confirmed by the United States Senate by a 54–43 vote on November 7, 1985. He received commission the same day. At 35, he was the youngest federal Appeals Court judge at the time of appointment.

In 2005, after concluding that the Ninth Circuit insufficiently addressed breaches of judicial conduct by Judge Manuel Real, after rules had been enacted to discourage behavior that would initiate "a substantial and widespread lowering of public confidence in the courts among reasonable people," Kozinski demanded the actual imposition of higher standards, writing,"It does not inspire confidence in the federal judiciary, when we treat our own so much better than we treat everyone else." Kozinski was persuasive and Real's case was reopened and he was disciplined.

He served as Chief Judge of the circuit from December 1, 2007, to December 1, 2014. In that capacity, he received complaints about Montana Federal Presiding Judge Richard F. Cebull, who had sent hundreds of emails disparaging women, racial minorities and liberal politicians. One joked that President Barack Obama's birth was the product of a sexual relationship between Obama's mother and a dog. Kozinski appointed a five-judge panel to review the matter in which he was the chair. It recommended disciplinary measures but not removal; the particulars of the investigation were largely kept confidential, at Kozinski's initiative.

=== Federal judge ===
During his tenure as a court of appeals judge, he became a prominent feeder judge. Between 2009–13, he placed nine of his clerks with the United States Supreme Court, the fifth most of any judge during that time period. He was particularly successful placing his clerks with Justice Anthony Kennedy, for whom he had himself clerked.

=== Defense of Ninth Circuit ===
In the 2000s, while defending the Ninth Circuit against criticism because of a recent controversial decision, Elk Grove Unified School District v. Newdow, Kozinski, who had not been part of the case, emphasized judicial independence: "It seems to me that this is what makes this country truly great—that we can have a judiciary where the person who appoints you doesn't own you." He also took a stand against the charge that the Ninth Circuit is overly liberal: "I can say with some confidence that cries that the Ninth Circuit is so liberal are just simply misplaced."

On November 30, 2007, he became the tenth Chief Judge of the Ninth Circuit. His term as chief judge ended on December 1, 2014, when he was succeeded by Judge Sidney R. Thomas.

=== Death penalty ===
In an interview on CBS's 60 Minutes in April 2017, Kozinski talked about his support for the death penalty, but with the reservation that death by lethal injection should no longer be used, calling it "a way of lying to ourselves, to make it look like executions are peaceful, benign". He instead advocated the use of the guillotine or firing squad, saying these methods are "100 percent effective" and cause "no doubt that what we are doing is a violent thing".

== Notable cases ==
=== Thompson v. Calderon ===
Thomas Martin Thompson was convicted based largely on the testimony of his fellow inmates, but doubts about the effectiveness of his defense counsel led seven former California prosecutors to file briefs on Thompson's behalf.

The Ninth Circuit had originally denied Thompson's habeas petition attacking the state court decision. Two days before Thompson's scheduled execution, the Ninth Circuit en banc reversed (7–4) the earlier denial. Kozinski dissented:

If the en banc call is missed for whatever reason, the error can be corrected in a future case where the problem again manifests itself.... That this is a capital case does not change the calculus. The stakes are higher in a death case, to be sure, but the stakes for a particular litigant play no legitimate role in the en banc process.

Kozinski's opinion was criticized by Judge Stephen Reinhardt, who called it "bizarre and horrifying" and "unworthy of any jurist." The en banc decision was reversed by the Supreme Court, which called the Ninth Circuit's action "a grave abuse of discretion."

=== White v. Samsung Electronics America, Inc. ===
Kozinski dissented from an order rejecting the suggestion for rehearing en banc an appeal filed by Vanna White against Samsung for depicting a robot on a Wheel of Fortune–style set in a humorous advertisement. While the Ninth Circuit held in favor of White, Kozinski dissented: "All creators draw in part on the work of those who came before, referring to it, building on it, poking fun at it; we call this creativity, not piracy." An extended extract from the opinion is widely quoted:

Overprotecting intellectual property is as harmful as underprotecting it. Creativity is impossible without a rich public domain. Nothing today, likely nothing since we tamed fire, is genuinely new: Culture, like science and technology, grows by accretion, each new creator building on the works of those who came before. Overprotection stifles the very creative forces it's supposed to nurture.

Kozinski's dissent in White is also famous for his sarcastic remark that "for better or worse, we are the Court of Appeals for the Hollywood Circuit."

=== Mattel, Inc. v. MCA Records, Inc. ===
Yet another of Kozinski's high-profile cases was the lawsuit filed by Mattel against MCA Records, the record label of Danish pop-dance group Aqua, for "turning Barbie into a sex object" in their 1997 song "Barbie Girl." Kozinski opened his opinion with: "If this were a sci-fi melodrama, it might be called Speech-Zilla meets Trademark Kong" and famously concluded his 2002 opinion with the words: "The parties are advised to chill."

=== United States v. Ramirez-Lopez (2003) ===
The majority found the due process rights of a man, who was accused of smuggling illegal immigrants across the border, were not violated despite the fact that witnesses who could have exonerated him had been deported before they could be deposed. Kozinski dissented. Federal prosecutors, however, dropped all charges and released the defendant.

In 2012, after prosecutors used similar tactics in another case, United States v. Leal-Del Carmen, Kozinski's position in Ramirez-Lopez became the law in the Ninth Circuit.

=== United States v. Isaacs ===
Kozinski was assigned an obscenity case, similar to that in Miller v. California. Ira Isaacs was accused of distributing videos depicting bestiality and other images. During the trial on June 11, 2008, the Los Angeles Times reported that Kozinski had "maintained a publicly accessible Web site featuring sexually explicit photos and videos" at alex.kozinski.com. The Times reported that the site included a photo of naked women on all fours painted to look like cows; a video of a half-dressed man cavorting with a sexually aroused farm animal; images of masturbation and public and contortionist sex; a slide show striptease featuring a transgender woman; a series of photos of women's crotches as seen through snug fitting clothing or underwear; and content with themes of defecation and urination. Kozinski admitted that some of the material was inappropriate but defended other content as "funny."

Calling the coverage a "baseless smear" by a disgruntled litigant, Stanford University law professor Lawrence Lessig pointed out that the Times had unfairly taken the videos and pictures out of context in its descriptions. He wrote that one frequently-mentioned video, the video described above as a "half-dressed man cavorting with a sexually aroused farm animal," which actually involves a man running away from a donkey, is available on YouTube, and is not, as is implied by the Times article, an example of bestiality. He also argued that the Kozinski family's right to privacy was violated when the disgruntled litigant exposed the private files, which were not intended for public viewing. Lessig compared the incident to breaking and entering a private residence.

Kozinski initially refused to comment on disqualifying himself and then granted a 48-hour stay, when the prosecutor requested time to explore "a potential conflict of interest." On June 13, Kozinski petitioned an ethics panel to investigate his own conduct. He asked Chief Justice John Roberts to assign the inquiry to a panel of judges outside the Ninth Circuit's jurisdiction. Also, he said that his son, Yale, and his family or friends may have been responsible for posting some of the material. Kozinski's wife wrote a defense characterizing those of his posts which were alleged to be pornographic, to rather be humorous.

Kozinski had previously been involved in a dispute over government monitoring of federal court employees' computers. Administrative Office head Ralph Mecham dropped the monitoring program but protested in the press. In 2001, Kozinski, who possesses sophisticated computer skills, personally disabled software which blocked federal court computers in three appellate circuits from receiving pornography.

On June 15, 2008, it was reported that Kozinski had recused himself from the case. On June 5, 2009, the Judicial Council of the Third Circuit issued an opinion clearing Kozinski of any wrongdoing.

=== Cetacean Research v. Sea Shepherd ===
In February 2013, Kozinski wrote an opinion reversing a district court ruling that had denied Japanese whalers Institute of Cetacean Research a preliminary injunction against the US-based anti-whaling group Sea Shepherd Conservation Society. Kozinski found that the militant conservationist group were "pirates," reversed the denial of injunction by the district court, and affirmed its own provisional injunction against Sea Shepherd. The injunction bars Sea Shepherd from approaching within 500 yards of ICS vessels.

Sea Shepherd founder Paul Watson dismissed the opinion enjoining his organization from interfering with ICS vessels as "entirely devoid of real evidence" and claimed that Sea Shepherd USA was in full compliance with the injunction.

=== Wood v. Ryan ===
In July 2014, Joseph Rudolph Wood, who had been sentenced to death, filed a motion before the Ninth Circuit Court of Appeals claiming a right to know which chemicals were included in the lethal injection that was to be used to execute him. While the court denied his motion, Kozinski issued a dissenting opinion, calling the use of drugs a "misguided effort to mask the brutality of executions by making them look serene and peaceful." He went on to argue that states should revert to more primitive methods like the guillotine, electric chair, gas chamber, and firing squads because they are accurate and do not mask the brutality. He wrote, "Sure, firing squads can be messy, but if we are willing to carry out executions, we should not shield ourselves from the reality that we are shedding human blood. If we, as a society, cannot stomach the splatter from an execution carried out by firing squad, then we shouldn't be carrying out executions at all." Wood's execution subsequently took 1 hour 57 min before he was pronounced dead.

=== State of Washington v. Trump ===
On March 17, 2017, Kozinski wrote a dissenting opinion when the Ninth Circuit denied en banc review after a three-judge panel blocked Trump's "travel ban." Joined by Jay Bybee, Consuelo Callahan, Carlos Bea, and Sandra Segal Ikuta, he argued that courts should not divine an illicit purpose from a President's statements on the campaign trail. Kozinski was criticized by Stephen Reinhardt and Marsha Berzon in two separate concurring opinions – Reinhardt referred to Kozinski's opinion a "diatribe" and Berzon called it "a one-sided attack on a decision by a duly constituted panel of this court." The Supreme Court ultimately upheld the "travel ban" against similar challenges in the 2018 case Trump v. Hawaii. Chief Justice John Roberts wrote for the majority that "because there is persuasive evidence that the entry restriction has a legitimate grounding in national security concerns, quite apart from any religious hostility," the courts "must accept that independent justification."

=== United States v. Sanchez-Gomez ===
In May 2017, Kozinski wrote for the narrowly divided en banc circuit when it found that the United States District Court for the Southern District of California's policy of indiscriminately shackling criminal defendants in all pretrial hearings violated the Constitution's Due Process Clause. In March 2018, the court's judgment was vacated as moot by the unanimous Supreme Court of the United States in United States v. Sanchez-Gomez.

== Investigations ==
=== Personal website ===
In 2008, the Los Angeles Times revealed Kozinski "maintained a publicly accessible website featuring sexually explicit photos and videos." Kozinski had collected a "vast" number of images sent to him via e-mail over many years and retained them on a personal web server in his home. Kozinski believed that only invited friends and family were able to view the image directory. Nonetheless, he called for an ethics investigation of himself, and was suspended from presiding over the obscenity trial of Ira Isaacs.

In July 2009, a panel, headed by Judge Anthony Joseph Scirica, wrote that Kozinski should have administered his web server more carefully, but that Kozinski's apology and deletion of the website, in addition to the panel's admonishment and the public dissemination of it, sufficiently ended the matter.

=== Sexual misconduct ===
Kozinski has been accused of sexual misconduct, ranging from harassment to assault, by more than 15 women. Former Kozinski clerk Katherine Ku has described Kozinski's chambers—where three or four law clerks, one or two judicial assistants, and one or more judicial externs typically worked at a given time—as a "hostile, demeaning and persistently sexualized environment". An image posted on the legal gossip blog Underneath their Robes shows a female law clerk with her arm draped around Kozinski's neck.

Some former Kozinski clerks have observed that because Kozinski retired from the bench after the first 15 women accused him of misconduct, "additional targets of, or witnesses to, Kozinski's transgressions" will not be likely to speak publicly. His former clerk, Brett Kavanaugh, during his hearing before the Senate Judiciary Committee taking up his nomination for the Supreme Court, received written questions tendered to him by Senator Chris Coons about any knowledge of Kozinski's inappropriate behavior, including his circulations of sexually explicit emails via his "Easy Rider Gag List". Kavanaugh denied knowing anything about the allegations against Kozinski prior to the publication of a news article about them in the Washington Post in December 2017.

Public allegations of Kozinski's sexual misconduct toward female lawyers and law students include:

- Romance novelist Heidi Bond, who once clerked for Kozinski, accused Kozinski of calling her into his office, pulling up pornography on his computer, and asking if she thought it was Photoshopped or if it aroused her sexually; when she said no, she alleged, he interrogated her as to why it did not.
- A former Kozinski clerk said Kozinski, in his chambers, showed her an "open-legged image of a male figure that was naked".
- "One recent law student at the University of Montana said that Kozinski, at a 2016 reception, pressed his finger into the side of her breast, which was covered by her clothes, and moved it with some 'deliberateness' to the center, purporting to be pushing aside her lapel to fully see her name tag."
- A lawyer "said Kozinski approached her when she was alone in a room at a legal community event around 2008 in downtown Los Angeles and – with no warning – gave her a bear hug and kissed her on the lips."
- University of Michigan Law School professor Leah Litman said at a 2017 dinner, Kozinski pinched her and joked that he had just had sex with his wife and she or others at the table would be "happy to know it still works".
- Former U.S. Court of Federal Claims judge Christine Odell Cook Miller, 73, said that "around early 1986 said Kozinski grabbed and squeezed each of her breasts as the two drove back from an event in Baltimore in the mid-1980s, after she had told him she did not want to stop at a motel and have sex."
- Dahlia Lithwick wrote in Slate that when she was clerking for another judge on the Ninth Circuit and Kozinski learned she was in a hotel room, he asked her what she was wearing.
- Emily Murphy, who was clerking for another Ninth Circuit judge at the time and later became a professor at UC Hastings, said Kozinski suggested to a group that she exercise naked in the courthouse gymnasium. Murphy has said, "It wasn't just clear that he was imagining me naked, he was trying to invite other people – my professional colleagues – to do so as well. That was what was humiliating about it."
- A former Ninth Circuit clerk reported that in late 2011 or early 2012, she found herself sitting next to Kozinski at a dinner in Seattle. He "kind of picked the tablecloth up so that he could see the bottom half of me, my legs", and he remarked, "I wanted to see if you were wearing pants because it's cold out."
- A "former Ninth Circuit clerk said that at a dinner with other clerks, Kozinski brought up a movie that contained a topless woman, talking about her 'voluptuous' breasts. The woman ... said she made a face to signal her disbelief at what he was saying, and Kozinski turned to her and said something like, 'What? I'm a man.'"
- One "former Kozinski extern said the judge once made a comment about her hair and looked her body up and down 'in a less-than-professional way.' That extern said Kozinski also once talked with her about a female judge stripping." The clerk said she would not want to be alone with Kozinski.
- A former extern said she had at least two conversations with Kozinski "that had sexual overtones directed at me".

=== Employment practices ===
Former clerks also describe abusive employment practices by Kozinski. For many years, Judge Kozinski's job announcement stated that "I'm looking for amazingly intelligent Supreme Court clerk wannabes eager to slave like dogs for an unreasonably demanding boss." Former law clerk Heidi Bond described how Kozinski forbade her from reading romance novels during her dinner break: the Judge asserted, "I control what you read, what you write, when you eat. You don't sleep if I say so. You don't shit unless I say so. Do you understand?" Bond also described interactions consistent with cycles of abuse.

This sort of diatribe was a regular occurrence. The judge had incredibly high standards, and when we failed to meet them, we were raked over the coals. I do not think a week passed without at least one such outburst; during bad times, they were a daily occurrence. He also had an innate sense of when he'd gone too far.

After he'd demonstrated that he had forgiven me for the misplaced comma or misspelled word that gave rise to his outburst, he would go up to me. "Heidi, honey," he would ask. "Do you still love me?" There was only one answer. To say "no" would be to invite the tempest a second time. "Yes, Judge," I would say. "Of course I still love you." He'd kiss my cheek, and I would kiss his.

Former clerk Katherine Ku wrote that Kozinski expected to be able to approve the location of her apartment, would complain when his clerks "wanted salad for lunch instead of whatever he was having", and "regularly diminished women and their accomplishments".

Complaints about Kozinski's abusive employment practices were raised as early as 1985 by former Kozinski employees. Those employees claimed Kozinski was unqualified to join the Ninth Circuit "because of a harsh temperament, questionable decisions and misleading testimony before the Judiciary Committee". They said Kozinski was "harsh, cruel, demeaning, sadistic, disingenuous and without compassion", and that his actions as a boss "portray[ed] an unusual degree of hostility ... and at times an almost complete disregard for the consequences of the actions upon individuals."

=== Timeline ===
On December 8, 2017, Kozinski was accused of misconduct by six women including former law clerks, legal externs, and junior staffers.

Kozinski responded to the allegations saying he did not remember showing any type of sexual material to his clerks and, "If this is all they are able to dredge up after 35 years, I am not too worried." Kozinski officially issued a statement that read:

I have been a judge for 35 years and during that time have had over 500 employees in my chambers. I treat all of my employees as family and work very closely with most of them. I would never intentionally do anything to offend anyone and it is regrettable that a handful have been offended by something I may have said or done.

On December 14, the chief judge of the Ninth Circuit referred the matters for investigation and a day later assigned them to the 2nd Circuit. On December 15, The Washington Post published a story with allegations against Kozinski from 9 more women, this time with more prominent accusers including colleagues, law students, a professor and a former judge. The disclosed sexual misbehavior allegations span more than three decades, including allegations of unwanted physical touching and invitations by Kozinski to have sex. Four of the women say Kozinski touched or kissed them without permission. Three of the clerks who were working for him when the allegations broke resigned their positions.

On December 18, 2017, Kozinski announced his immediate retirement. It was unknown whether the investigation on Kozinski would continue. He stated during his resignation that the women must have misunderstood his "broad sense of humor" and "candid way of speaking". Upon his retirement, many news sources characterized him as both a "libertarian", and a writer of "colorful" opinions.

== Post-judicial career ==
On December 9, 2019, Kozinski argued before the Ninth Circuit for the first time since his resignation due to the scandal. Kozinski argued for a plaintiff suing over intellectual property.

Kozinski is representing former President Donald Trump in his lawsuit against Twitter on appeal in the Ninth Circuit.

== Personal life ==
Kozinski and his wife, attorney Marcy Jane Tiffany, were married soon after he graduated from law school. They have three sons.

As a judge, Kozinski would host a movie night called Kozinski's Favorite Flicks. In a demonstration of his knowledge in this realm, he worked the titles of some 200 movies into his opinion in United States v. Syufy Enterprises.

In addition to being a former judge, Kozinski has been an essayist and a judicial commentator. Kozinski contributions to law journals have been used in graduate instruction at Georgetown University.

== See also ==
- List of Jewish American jurists
- List of law clerks for the chief justice of the United States
- List of United States federal judges by longevity of service

Legal offices
New seat	Judge of the United States Claims Court; 1982–1985	Succeeded by Marian Blank Horn
New office	Chief Judge of the United States Claims Court; 1982–1985	Succeeded by Loren A. Smith
New seat	Judge of the United States Court of Appeals for the Ninth Circuit; 1985–2017	Succeeded by Daniel Bress
Preceded by Mary M. Schroeder	Chief Judge of the United States Court of Appeals for the Ninth Circuit; 2007–2014	Succeeded by Sidney Runyan Thomas
