= George Jung =

American drug trafficker and smuggler (1942–2021)

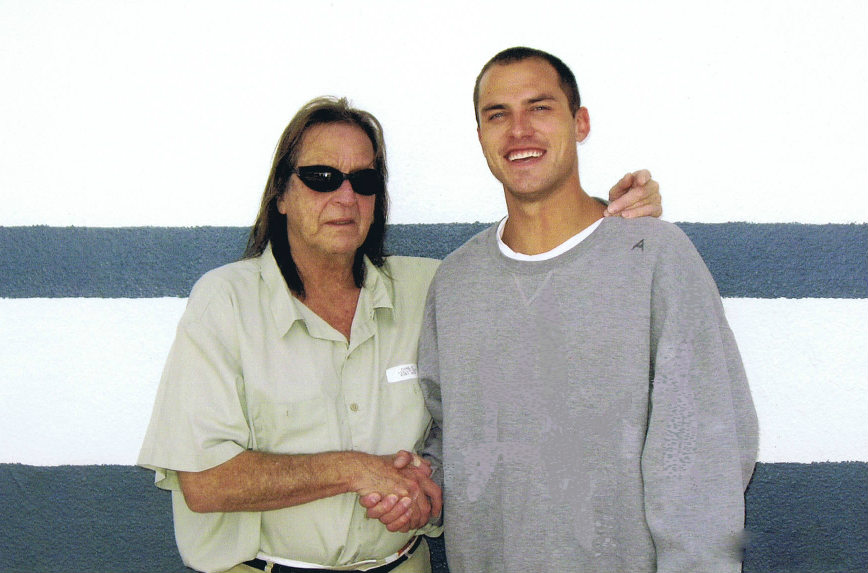
- Jung (left) and Anthony Curcio in La Tuna prison in 2010
- Born: George Jacob Jung; August 6, 1942; Weymouth, Massachusetts, U.S.
- Died: May 5, 2021 (aged 78); Weymouth, Massachusetts, U.S.
- Other names: Boston George, El Americano
- Occupations: Drug trafficker and smuggler
- Conviction: Conspiracy (1994)
- Penalty: 60 years' imprisonment; served 20 years

George Jacob Jung (/ˈjʌŋ/; August 6, 1942 – May 5, 2021), nicknamed Boston George and El Americano, was an American drug trafficker and smuggler. He was a major figure in the United States cocaine trade during the 1970s and early '80s. Jung and his partner Carlos Lehder smuggled cocaine into the United States for the Colombian Medellín Cartel. Jung was sentenced to 60 years in prison in 1994 on conspiracy charges, but was released in 2014. Jung was portrayed by Johnny Depp in the biopic Blow (2001).

== Early life ==
George Jung was born on August 6, 1942, in Weymouth, Massachusetts, to Frederick Jung, who owned a small business, and Ermine (née O'Neill) Jung. In high school, Jung was a star football player and was described by his classmates as "a natural leader", but was charged by an undercover police officer for solicitation of prostitution. After graduating in 1961 from Weymouth High School, Jung briefly attended the University of Southern Mississippi, where he considered studying advertising, but dropped out. Jung began recreationally using marijuana and sold a portion of everything he bought to break even.

In 1967, after meeting with a childhood friend, Jung realized the enormous profit potential represented by smuggling the cannabis he bought in California back to New England. Jung initially had his flight attendant girlfriend transport the drugs in her suitcases on flights. In search of even greater profits, he expanded his operation to flying the drugs in from Puerto Vallarta, Mexico, using airplanes stolen from private airports on Cape Cod and professional pilots. At the height of this enterprise, Jung and his associates were reportedly making $250,000 a month (equivalent to over $2.1 million in 2025 dollars, adjusting for inflation). This ended in 1974, when Jung was arrested in Chicago for smuggling 660 pounds (300 kg) of marijuana. He had been staying at the Playboy Club, where he was to meet a connection who would pick up the marijuana. The connection was arrested for heroin smuggling; however, he informed the authorities about Jung to get a reduced sentence. After arguing with the judge about the purpose of sending a man to prison "for crossing an imaginary line with a bunch of plants", Jung was sent to the Federal Correctional Institution, Danbury.

== Medellín Cartel ==
While serving a sentence for marijuana smuggling at the Federal Correctional Institution, Danbury, in 1974, George Jung met Carlos Lehder, a young Colombian–German trafficker later associated with the Medellín Cartel. According to court records and DEA intelligence summaries, Jung introduced Lehder to basic methods of aviation-based smuggling, including aircraft procurement and drop coordination, while Lehder discussed emerging opportunities in Colombia's cocaine trade.

After their release in 1975, Jung and Lehder collaborated on several small-scale cocaine shipments from Colombia to the United States, using private aircraft and Caribbean refueling points. Jung's role was limited to the early logistical phase; once Lehder began developing his independent transport base on Norman's Cay in the Bahamas (1978–1981), the two ended their partnership.

There is no verifiable evidence—in judicial records, declassified enforcement files, or academic literature—that Jung ever met or worked directly with Pablo Escobar or other Medellín leaders. Declassified DEA and Colombian intelligence assessments from the period describe Jung as an independent American smuggler who operated briefly alongside Lehder before the latter's integration into Medellín's network.

Jung's participation in cocaine trafficking declined after a series of arrests in the late 1970s and early 1980s. Later claims that he “worked with Escobar” or “controlled major portions of the U.S. cocaine market” are unsupported by available evidence and are generally attributed to post-facto mythologizing following his release and the 2001 biographical film Blow.

== Prison ==
Jung was arrested in 1994 with 1,754 pounds (796 kg) of cocaine in Topeka, Kansas. He pleaded guilty to three counts of conspiracy and received a 60-year sentence. His sentence was reduced to about 20 years after he testified against his ex-partner, Carlos Lehder. Jung was incarcerated at Otisville Federal Prison in Otisville, New York, before transferring to Federal Correctional Institution, Fort Dix, New Jersey, and Federal Correctional Institution, La Tuna in Anthony, Texas. This was his third time in prison.

== Release and death ==
Jung was due to be released in November 2014, but was released early, on June 2, 2014, after nearly 20 years. In 2016, he was jailed for a federal supervision violation, then released from a halfway house in 2017.

In September 2014, Jung contributed to the novel Heavy with T. Rafael Cimino, nephew of film director Michael Cimino. Heavy is a fictional story about Jung escaping from a Cuban prison and fleeing to Guatemala.

Jung had been suffering from liver and kidney failure and was receiving hospice care when he died on May 5, 2021, at his Weymouth, Massachusetts, home.
