= United States v. Syufy Enterprises =

- Court: United States Court of Appeals for the Ninth Circuit
- Full case name: United States of America v. Syufy Enterprises; Raymond J. Syufy
- Argued: August 14, 1989
- Decided: May 9, 1990
- Citation: 903 F.2d 659

Case history
- Prior history: 712 F. Supp. 1386 (N.D. Cal. 1989)

Court membership
- Judges sitting: Charles E. Wiggins, Alex Kozinski, Justin Lowe Quackenbush

Case opinions
- Majority: Kozinski, joined by Wiggins (in full); Quackenbush (in part)
- Concurrence: Quackenbush

Laws applied
- Sherman Antitrust Act, 15 U.S.C. § 2; Clayton Antitrust Act, 15 U.S.C. § 18

United States v. Syufy Enterprises, 903 F.2d 659 (9th Cir. 1990), was an antitrust case decided by the United States Court of Appeals for the Ninth Circuit.

== Facts ==
The United States Department of Justice alleged that Syufy Enterprises had monopolized or attempted to monopolize the motion picture exhibition business in Las Vegas, Nevada. Raymond Syufy opened a newly built six-screen multiplex in Las Vegas in 1981. The success of that Syufy theater led Mann Theatres and Plitt Theatres to exit the Las Vegas market, selling all of their theaters to Syufy. In 1984, Syufy bought out Cragin Industries' eleven-screen Redrock Theatre; upon completion of that purchase, Syufy then owned all of the first-run theaters in Las Vegas, leaving Roberts Company (which exhibited mostly second run films) as his sole competition in the city.

The Justice Department brought a case against Syufy for antitrust violations, arguing that "you may not get monopoly power by buying out your competitors."

== Judgment ==
=== District Court ===
The United States District Court for the Northern District of California found in favor of Syufy, holding that "Syufy's actions did not injure competition because there are no barriers to entry—others could and did enter the market—and that Syufy therefore did not have the power to control prices or exclude the competition."

=== Court of Appeals ===
The Court of Appeals affirmed the district court's ruling in a decision written by Judge Alex Kozinski which became notable both for its commentary on business competition in a free enterprise system and for Kozinski's incorporation of over 200 movie titles into his opinion, including statements such as "Roberts/UA's newly opened theatres evolved from absolute beginners, barely staying alive, into a big business."

The Ninth Circuit's decision against the government and in favor of Syufy emphasized that there were no barriers to entry in the Las Vegas cinema business. In fact, competition arose almost immediately after Syufy achieved his monopoly. Within a week after becoming the sole first-run exhibitor in Las Vegas, Syufy attempted to renounce the guarantee he had previously offered Orion Pictures Corporation for the movie The Cotton Club. Rather than release Syufy from his guarantee, Orion sued Syufy for breach of contract and chose to license The Cotton Club to Roberts instead. Orion also stopped licensing its other movies to Syufy not only in Las Vegas, but anywhere.

Roberts Company then began opening new multiplexes of its own, increasing its screen count to 28 in Las Vegas by December 1986, compared to 23 for Syufy. In 1987, Roberts sold its theaters to United Artists Theaters, then the largest exhibition circuit in the United States.
