= Anthony Curcio =

American author, public speaker, and convicted bank robber

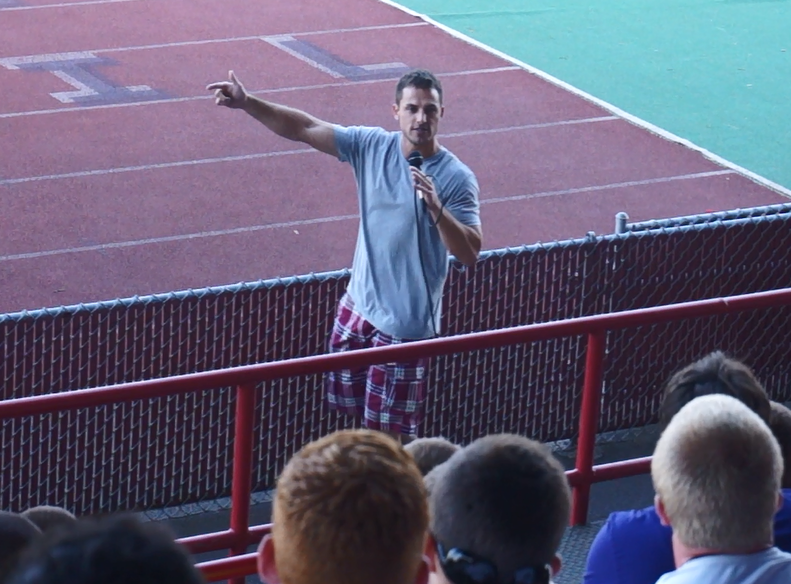
- Curcio speaking to college football players in August 2014
- Born: September 1, 1980 (age 46); Monroe, Washington, U.S.
- Occupations: Speaker, author
- Children: 2

Anthony J. Curcio (born September 1, 1980) is an American author, public speaker, youth sports coach and convicted robber. In 2008, Curcio was responsible for one of the most elaborately planned armored car heists in U.S. history. He was eventually arrested and sentenced to six years in federal prison. Upon his release from prison he has devoted his life to working with youth in the field of drug abuse and crime prevention, speaking to students and athletes across the U.S., before being convicted of wire fraud in 2026. He has been featured in GQ, Esquire, 20/20, Fox News, NPR, and NBC, among other media outlets.

== Early life ==
Curcio was born and raised in Monroe, Washington. As a teenager, he was popular and talented and voted captain of both football and basketball teams at Monroe High School. Curcio broke many records in football and received several honors and awards for his play in both sports.

Curcio later went on to play football at his father's alma mater, the University of Idaho, which had been his childhood dream. While returning a punt in practice, Curcio tore his anterior cruciate ligament, ending his promising college football career and introducing him to the powerful pain killer Vicodin. Curcio quickly became addicted to the prescription pills. Soon after, he began experiencing withdrawals and even injured himself intentionally by kicking an oak coffee table repeatedly in order to obtain more pills. With family pressure, Curcio agreed to enter a drug/alcohol treatment facility.

After completing a 21-day in-patient program, Curcio, now sober, started his first business, called "Tony's Gaming", which bought and sold casino tables and other gaming merchandise. Curcio expanded his business by leasing a commercial space and adjacent storage. Within a few months of being open to the public, Tony's Gaming was unexpectedly shut down. The Washington State Gambling Commission and local police raided Tony's Gaming and confiscated the inventory, stating that Curcio did not possess the proper permits. He later became aware that the police raid was due to influence from a real estate broker who had financial interest in a local casino. Curcio attempted to retain legal representation in the case but was denied services by local attorneys already debriefed by the real estate broker/casino owner.

Curcio was still able to maintain a successful business and was still committed to taking care of his family. He graduated from Washington State University in 2004, married his high school sweetheart, had two daughters and later owned a real estate investment company based in Seattle, Washington.

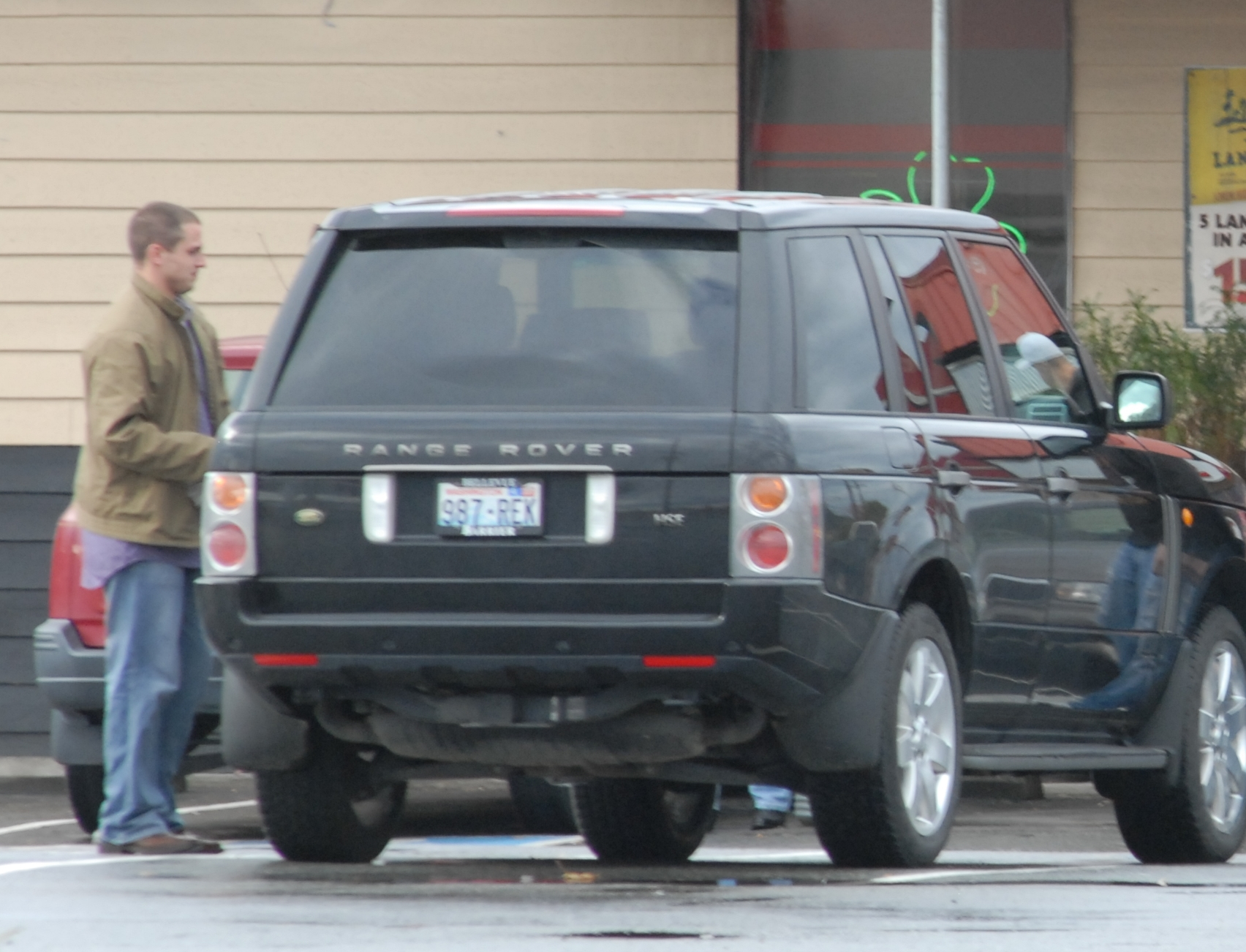
Anthony Curcio under the surveillance of the FBI

Despite having completed four drug and alcohol treatment programs, in approximately 2006, prior to the armored car heist, ABC News stated that Curcio was spending nearly $15,000 a month on his increasing drug habit including benzodiazepines.

Curcio's real estate investment business took a heavy downturn when the economy collapsed in 2008, leaving him with several homes on the verge of foreclosure and vehicles near repossession among other outstanding personal debts.

== Brink's robbery ==
For three months, Curcio observed a Brink's armored car as it made deliveries to the Bank of America branch in Monroe. He took notes of the schedule, diagrammed locations of the bank's cameras, and noted the armored car's blind spots.

He considered police protocol in responding to robberies and the location of the bank and decided on using a local creek to escape.

After weeks of hand-dredging the creek in Woods Creek and a failed practice attempt at using a jet ski for the getaway, he changed his approach and created a cable pulley system to quickly pull himself, and large bags of cash, upstream using a connected canvas-wrapped inner tube. Curcio's planning culminated with an advertisement he placed on Craigslist a few days before the robbery. The online ad sought 15 to 20 workers for a fictitious city cleanup project, promising $28.50 an hour. The laborers were told to wear jeans, a blue shirt, work shoes, and a yellow safety vest. The ad also told the applicants they needed to bring safety goggles and a painter's mask. The ad directed them to meet in the Bank of America parking lot at the exact time Curcio planned to rob the armored car.

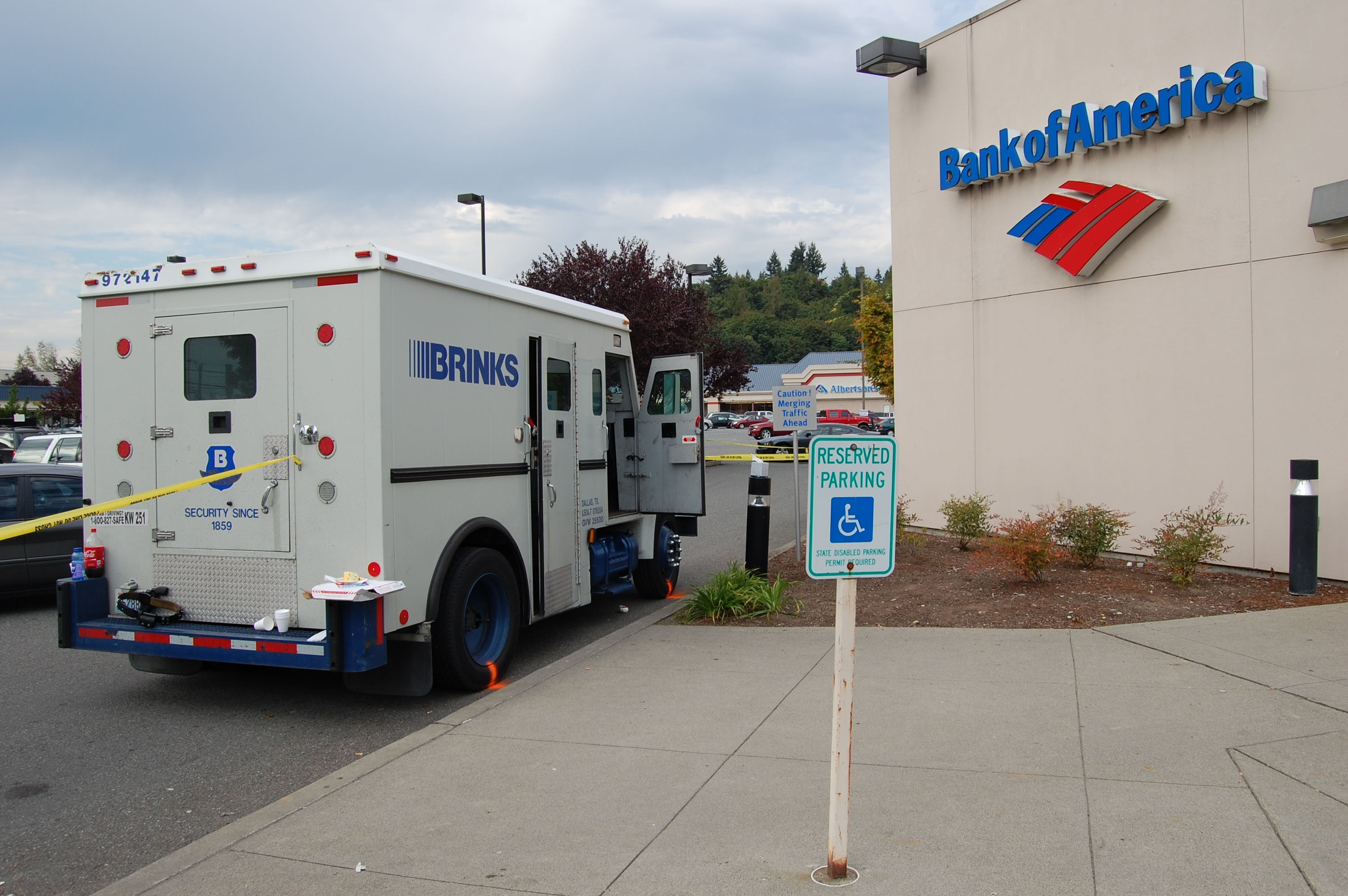
The Brink's armored car after the robbery (September 30, 2008)

On September 30, 2008, Curcio, dressed identically to his decoy applicants, pretended to work the grounds near the bank.

Unarmed, wearing a blue shirt, jeans, yellow safety vest, work boots, and painter's mask, he pepper-sprayed the Brink's armored car guard who was pushing a dolly loaded with money into the bank. The pepper spray forced the guard to reach for his eyes and release the cart that held the money. Curcio grabbed two bags of money, containing more than $400,000, and ran toward the creek. Meanwhile, police arrived to find the bank's parking lot filled with men matching the robber's description.

At the water's edge, Curcio threw the money into the inner tube and pulled himself up the creek with the cables he had previously strung. He traveled about 200 yards upstream and exited the creek behind several businesses on the opposite side of the highway from the bank. Curcio removed his wig and worker's clothing that had been attached by Velcro, revealing different attire underneath. He climbed into the trunk of a getaway vehicle driven by an associate and left.

Curcio's careful planning and unusual getaway gained national attention. The timing of the robbery came days after announcements of the government's bank bailout package that included Bank of America. The unique robbery techniques gained notoriety for the mysterious robber who was referred to as the "Craigslist Robber" and "D.B. Tuber", after the 1970s hijacker D. B. Cooper.

== Arrest ==
Curcio's undoing came a month later when a homeless man reported to police that several weeks before the robbery he had seen a man drive up to the Bank of America parking lot and retrieve a disguise from behind a trash bin. The man found it suspicious enough to write down the license plate number of the car which he later provided to police. The car was registered to Curcio. What the man had seen was one of Curcio's practice runs to ensure proper timing of the heist.

After Curcio returned from a trip to Las Vegas, Nevada, the FBI began their surveillance of him as a suspect in the robbery. Local authorities retrieved his DNA from a drink bottle disposed of by Curcio at a gas station and compared it to the DNA from the face mask and wig discarded a short distance from the scene of the robbery. Incidentally, the detective had stored the two items together, but because the DNA samples matched and Curcio was arrested in Lake Stevens, Washington, getting out of a luxury SUV with $17,000 in cash. With only circumstantial evidence connecting Curcio to the crime, he initially bonded out, but a month later (January 2009), his bond was revoked and he was returned to custody after being suspected of witness tampering.

No charges were ever filed against any of Curcio's unnamed co-conspirators. All of the money except for what Curcio paid the getaway driver and other accomplices was eventually recovered.

== Prison ==
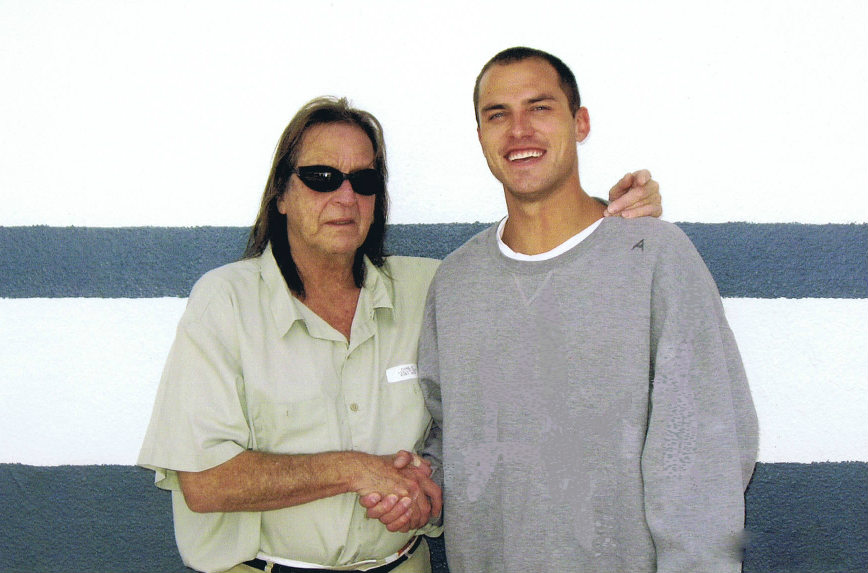
George Jung and Curcio in La Tuna, Federal Prison

Curcio pleaded guilty and was sentenced to 72 months in federal prison and served his time in FCI Big Spring, FCI La Tuna and Coleman Correctional Complex.

While being housed in FCI La Tuna, Curcio became friends with fellow inmate George Jung. Jung encouraged Curcio to write a book, and put him in touch with author/biographer Dane Batty. The two soon began correspondence.

During this time, Curcio was with two inmates who had previously assaulted another inmate. While prison authorities knew Curcio was not involved in the attack, authorities still held him ‘under investigation’ until the case had been resolved. Curcio spent seven months in solitary confinement for this affiliation. In solitary, he received beatings, witnessed suicides and had cockroaches crawl all over his body at night. Upon his release, he wrote the book Heist and High, promising to prevent others from making the same decisions he had made.

Throughout the duration of his sentence, Curcio wrote and illustrated over 20 children's books, including one aimed at the children of incarcerated parents titled My Daddy's in Jail.

Curcio finished his incarceration at USP Coleman in Florida, where he completed a drug-treatment program and was released from custody in April 2013.

== Release ==
Curcio was released April 4, 2013, and returned to the Seattle area, reuniting with his family. He has since been working with youth, including coaching both of his daughters' teams and giving presentations regarding drug abuse prevention and the importance of making positive choices. He speaks to middle schools, high schools and universities across the U.S.

== Post-release career ==
Curcio has been featured on several media platforms using his story to increase awareness regarding addiction. His book, Heist and High (Nish Publishing, 286 pages), was released June 21, 2013, and was the recipient of several awards prior to being withdrawn from publication at Curcio's request due to inaccuracies.

Curcio went on to find his passion, children's books, and became a five time best selling author for his positive stories and elaborate illustrations.

After finding success in books, Anthony decided to focus more on media, which began as narrative projects where his personal stories of addiction and post-incarceration arc as the throughline, humanizing difficult subjects and providing hope to those who need it most. His story anchors the BBC partnership series Friday Night Heists under Sport’s Strangest Crimes, and he also appears in widely distributed video formats including HiHo Kids and a TEDx talk published on the TEDx Talks channel.

== May 2024 trading card fraud indictment ==
On May 23, 2024, the U.S. Attorney's Office for the Southern District of New York announced that Anthony Curcio and another Washington man, Iosif Bondarchuk, had been charged with wire fraud stemming from allegations of fraudulently rated trading cards. The listed charges carry a maximum sentence of 20 years in prison. Curcio was found guilty in January 2026.
