= Trapholt =

Museum in Kolding, Denmark

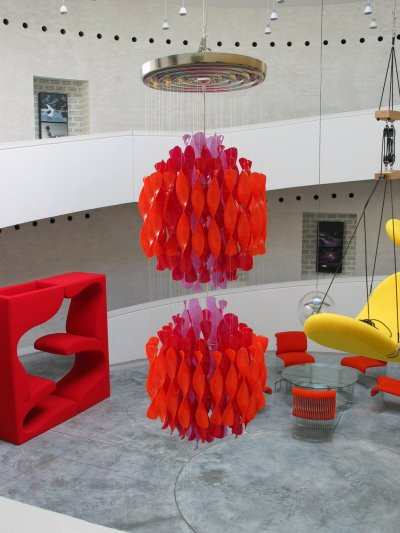
- Established: 1988
- Location: Kolding, Denmark
- Type: Art museum
- Visitors: 82,994 (2018)
- Director: Karen Grøn
- Curator: Vera Westergaard
- Architects: Boje Lundgaard, Bente Aude
- Owner: Autonomous public institution
- Website: trapholt.dk

Trapholt is a museum of contemporary art and design located in Kolding, Denmark. It opened in 1988 and was previously named Trapholt Kunstmuseum (Trapholt Museum of Art) but its increasing focus on the broader arts lead to its shortened name. It describes itself as a "museum for modern painting, crafts, design, and furniture design".

== Background ==
The museum was expanded in 1996 to house a furniture collection with contemporary Danish furniture design, with a collection of over 500 chairs from the 20th century, which is the largest in Denmark. The spiral architecture of this part of the museum is inspired by the Guggenheim Museum. It also holds collections of crafts, primarily ceramics and textiles.

Trapholt comprises the museum itself and its surrounding sculpture park which includes works by Ingvar Cronhammar, Bjørn Nørgaard, Lars Ravn, and Søren Jensen. In addition to temporary exhibitions, the museum hosts a permanent exhibition of paintings by Richard Mortensen. Totalling over 2,500 square metres, Trapholt is one of the largest modern art and design museums in Denmark outside Copenhagen.

Arne Jacobsen's Kubeflex modular summer house, created by the architect in 1969-70, is located at Trapholt. It is the only of its kind as it never entered production given the artist's death in 1971 and is furnished with Jacobsen's own designs. Until 2002 it was used as a private summer house by the Jacobsen family, but was moved from Sydsjælland to Trapholt in 2005 and opened to the public.

In 2000, the museum gained international notability when artist Marco Evaristti exhibited his work Helena, an installation featuring ten functioning blenders each containing a live goldfish, allowing viewers to turn on and kill the fish. At least one visitor did, killing two fish. Danish animal rights charity Dyrenes Beskyttelse complained and then-Director of Trapholt Peter Meyer was fined 2000 DKK for animal cruelty as he refused a police request to turn off the blenders. After refusing to pay the fine, Meyer and the museum were taken to court, where they were eventually acquitted of the charge and the fine was retracted.
