= Forced Entry (2002 film) =

- DVD released by Extreme Associates
- Directed by: Lizzy Borden
- Written by: Lizzy Borden
- Produced by: Rob Zicari
- Starring: Mickey G. Valentino; Rob Zicari; Jewel De'Nyle; Veronica Caine; Taylor St. Claire; Michael Stefano; Brian Surewood; Alexandra Quinn
- Cinematography: Glenn Baren; Smiley Johnson; Derek Newblood
- Edited by: Lynkoln Townekharr
- Music by: Fornicator; Lil' Merchant; XXX Groovemaster
- Production company: Extreme Associates
- Distributed by: Extreme Associates
- Release date: April 22, 2002 (United States)
- Running time: 130 minutes
- Country: United States
- Language: English

Forced Entry is a 2002 adult horror film written and directed by Lizzy Borden, produced by Rob Zicari, and released by Extreme Associates. The film is loosely based on the crimes of California serial killer Richard Ramirez.

== Plot ==
A man knocks on a teenage girl's door, claiming to be in need of directions. When the girl leaves to answer the phone, the man sneaks in and grabs her when she returns. Physically and verbally assaulting the girl, the man drags her into a bedroom by the neck and rapes her. Tracking the killer is obnoxious Channel 5 Action News reporter Roberto Negro, who has been receiving taunting letters from the murderer. The killer and two accomplices (one of them initially reluctant) attack a pregnant housewife, filming themselves pummeling and raping her at gunpoint. When the trio finishes, they shoot the woman and her dog. Roberto reports on the housewife's death, and while the authorities refuse to confirm there is a serial killer on the loose, Roberto is convinced there is.

Spotting a woman having car trouble, the killer and his partners pull up in their van, force her into the vehicle and take her to their hideout. The woman is filmed being abused, raped and stabbed. An envelope containing a knife, a gun and another note is sent to Roberto and the police acquire clues from these items. Another package, this one containing a VHS tape, is dropped off at Roberto's office. The tape is a tribute to the killer, showing two of his fans brutalizing and sexually assaulting a woman. Roberto recognizes one of the copycats as a gas station attendant, whom the police arrests. Elsewhere, two men recognize the serial killer when he walks by them on the street and chase him, being joined by several others. The killer is cornered in an alleyway, and beat and stabbed to death. Roberto finds the man's body and kicks it twice before walking away.

== Cast ==
- Jewel De'Nyle as Victim #1
- Taylor St. Claire as Victim #2
- Veronica Cain as Victim #3
- Alexandra Quinn as The Copycat Killer's Victim
- Michael Stefano as The Killer
- Mickey G. as Accomplice #1
- Brian Surewood as Accomplice #2
- Valentino as The Copycat Killer
- Rob Zicari as Roberto Negro
- Angel
- Mr. Vegas
- Pete Malloy
- Wanker Wang
- Dr. Jeckyl
- Evil Merchant
- Derek Newblood
- Sylveeya
- Doomhammer
- Smiley Johnson
- Rawhide Kid
- Rod Fontana
- Mr. Pete
- X-Man
- Juggs
- Tony Tedeschi

== Reception ==
The crew of the television series Frontline stormed off in disgust while visiting the set of the film for their documentary American Porn. The incident led to the United States v. Extreme Associates obscenity trial. Paul Fishbein, president of AVN, referred to Forced Entry and the rest of the Extreme Associates library as "horrible, unwatchable, disgusting, aberrant movies".

The Village Voice stated the film is "The most violent porno I've seen. It's both shocking and completely banal" while Adult FYI wrote "It's brutal. More than that, it's terribly evil. Convincing. Incredibly well acted and directed". A score of six out of ten was awarded by Cyberspace Adult Video Reviews, which concluded its review with "They have every right to make and sell this tape. It is a shame that these very talented people would waste their time on this. Can you imagine the good stuff they could be doing?"

Forced Entry was described as "a disturbing piece of hardcore, made by and for some very disturbed people" by Recarts Movies Erotica, which said that while the acting was good and it succeeded in creating physical and sexual tension, it suffered from cheesy effects and editing, inconsistent camerawork, and poor production values. Adult Industry News decried Forced Entry as a borderline snuff film, writing "promoting violence and/or making (or trying to make) rape look sexy is very disturbing" and "movies like this are more than controversial, they are bad for the adult film business". Academic Eugenie Brinkema has written extensively on the film, its content and its reception in an article called "Rough Sex".

== See also ==
- Forced Entry, a similar film released in 1973.
- United States v. Extreme Associates, Inc.
