= Daniel Bress =

American federal judge (born 1979)

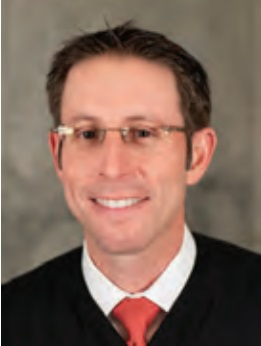

Judge of the United States Court of Appeals for the Ninth Circuit
- Incumbent
- Assumed office July 26, 2019
- Appointed by: Donald Trump
- Preceded by: Alex Kozinski

Personal details
- Born: Daniel Aaron Bress; 1979 (age 46–47) Hollister, California, U.S.
- Party: Republican
- Education: Harvard University (BA); University of Virginia (JD)

Daniel Aaron Bress (born 1979) is an American lawyer and jurist serving as a United States circuit judge of the United States Court of Appeals for the Ninth Circuit. He was appointed in 2019 by President Donald Trump. Before becoming a federal judge, Bress was a partner at the law firm Kirkland & Ellis.

== Early life and education ==
Bress was raised in Gilroy, California. He studied government at Harvard University, graduating in 2001 with a Bachelor of Arts, magna cum laude. He worked as a paralegal at the Federal Trade Commission from 2001 to 2002, then attended the University of Virginia School of Law, where he was editor-in-chief of the Virginia Law Review. He graduated in 2005 with a Juris Doctor with Order of the Coif membership.

== Career ==
After graduating from law school, Bress was a law clerk to judge J. Harvie Wilkinson III of the United States Court of Appeals for the Fourth Circuit from 2005 to 2006 and to Justice Antonin Scalia of the Supreme Court of the United States from 2006 to 2007. He then entered private practice in the San Francisco office of the law firm Munger, Tolles & Olson. From 2011 to 2019, Bress was a partner at the Washington, D.C. office of Kirkland & Ellis. He has served as an adjunct professor of law at the University of Virginia and Columbus School of Law of the Catholic University of America.

=== Federal judicial service ===
On January 30, 2019, President Donald Trump announced his intent to nominate Bress to the Ninth Circuit. On February 6, 2019, his nomination was sent to the Senate. He was nominated to the seat vacated by Alex Kozinski, who retired on December 18, 2017. On May 22, 2019, a hearing on his nomination was held before the Senate Judiciary Committee. On June 20, 2019, his nomination was reported out of committee by a 12–10 vote. On July 8, 2019, the United States Senate invoked cloture on his nomination by a 50–42 vote and on the following day, July 9, his nomination was confirmed by a 53–45 vote. He received his judicial commission on July 26, 2019.

== Memberships ==
He has been a member of the Federalist Society since 2003.

== See also ==
- Donald Trump judicial appointment controversies
- List of Jewish American jurists
- List of law clerks for the ninth seat of the Supreme Court of the United States

Legal offices
Preceded by Alex Kozinski	Judge of the United States Court of Appeals for the Ninth Circuit; 2019–present	Incumbent
