= Lizzy Borden (actress) =

American pornographic actress and professional wrestler

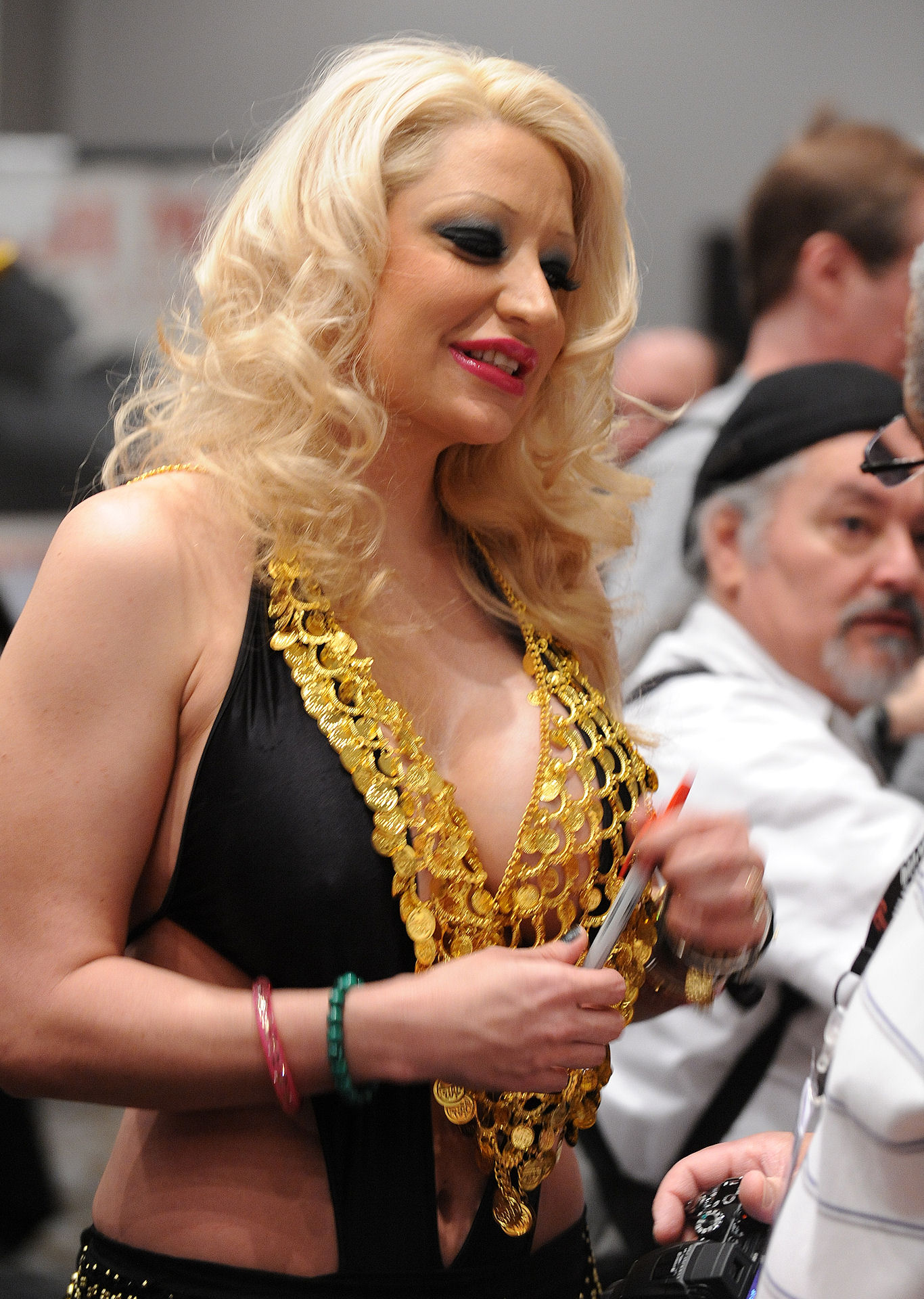
- Borden in 2012
- Born: Janet Romano-Zicari; Huntington Beach, California, U.S.
- Other name: Lizzie B
- Occupations: Pornographic actress; professional wrestler
- Employer: Extreme Associates
- Height: 5 ft 8 in (1.73 m)
- Spouse: Rob Zicari (m. 2001; div. 2013)

Janet Romano-Zicari, better known as Lizzy Borden, is an American former pornographic actress and professional wrestler.

== Career ==
=== Pornography ===
In 1999, Borden began directing adult movies herself. She became known for the extreme content of her films, directing movies like Cocktails (2000), in which women drink vomit and other bodily fluids, Fossil Fuckers (2001), in which old women have sex with young men, Cannibalism: The Last Supper (2002), and Forced Entry (2002), which shows simulated rape. She often worked with Veronica Caine, such as in Cocktails and Forced Entry, and in wrestling.

In 2002, Borden appeared in the non-pornographic direct-to-video horror-comedy Terror Toons.

==== Indictment ====
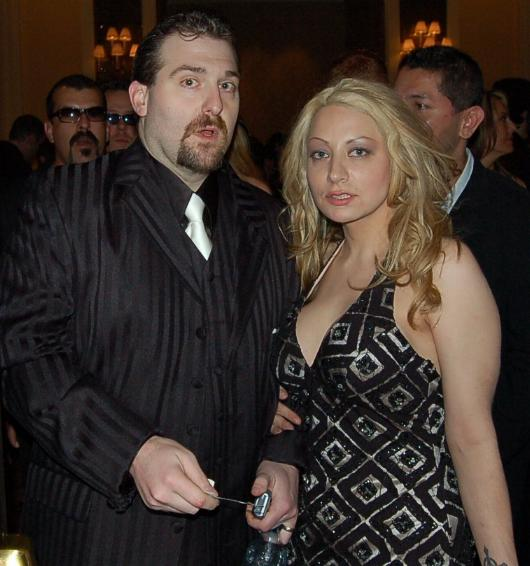
Borden with her then-husband Rob Zicari in 2006

The filming of Forced Entry was covered in the PBS Frontline documentary American Porn (2002). On July 1, 2009, Borden and former husband Rob Zicari were sentenced to one year and one day in prison for distributing obscenity, and in late September the couple began serving their prison sentences, Zicari at La Tuna Federal Correctional Institution in Texas and Romano at Waseca Federal Correctional Institution in Minnesota. On May 10, 2010, Borden was released from prison and began to start work on her website, movies and other projects again.

=== Professional wrestling ===
In 1999, Borden and Black formed Xtreme Pro Wrestling (XPW), which hired various pornographic actresses as valets or wrestlers. She played the role of the evil, snobbish owner or "The Boss's Wife". She had Chastity as her assistant and feuded with Kristi Myst. She repeatedly humiliated Kristi by making her do stripteases for her, and then shoving her around. She was valet of The Messiah and led him to the XPW Championship as part of The Black Army. When The Messiah walked out of XPW, rumors emerged on the Internet about an alleged affair between him and Borden, which was confirmed by The Messiah himself in a 2020 interview with Kriss Kloss titled "Xtreme Memories" Borden often feuded with any female in XPW, usually getting her allies of The Black Army to attack them for her. She feuded with Veronica Caine, Lucy, Tammy Lynn Sytch, Nicole Bass, and Major Gunns and managed Johnny Webb for a time once The Messiah was gone. She briefly aligned with Lady Victoria, who had turned heel and left the side of the tag team "Mexico's Most Wanted"; Borden made Victoria dye her hair blonde to be like her. In her feud with Lucy, she and Shane Douglas battled Lucy and her "husband" Vic Grimes in mixed tag matches. In late 2002, she and Douglas took over the company and ran shows out of Pennsylvania. XPW ended soon afterwards.

=== Music ===
Borden is now signed with Crash Music, Inc. as the label's official spokesmodel. She has also produced her own music.
