= Helena (artwork) =

2000 art installation by Marco Evaristti

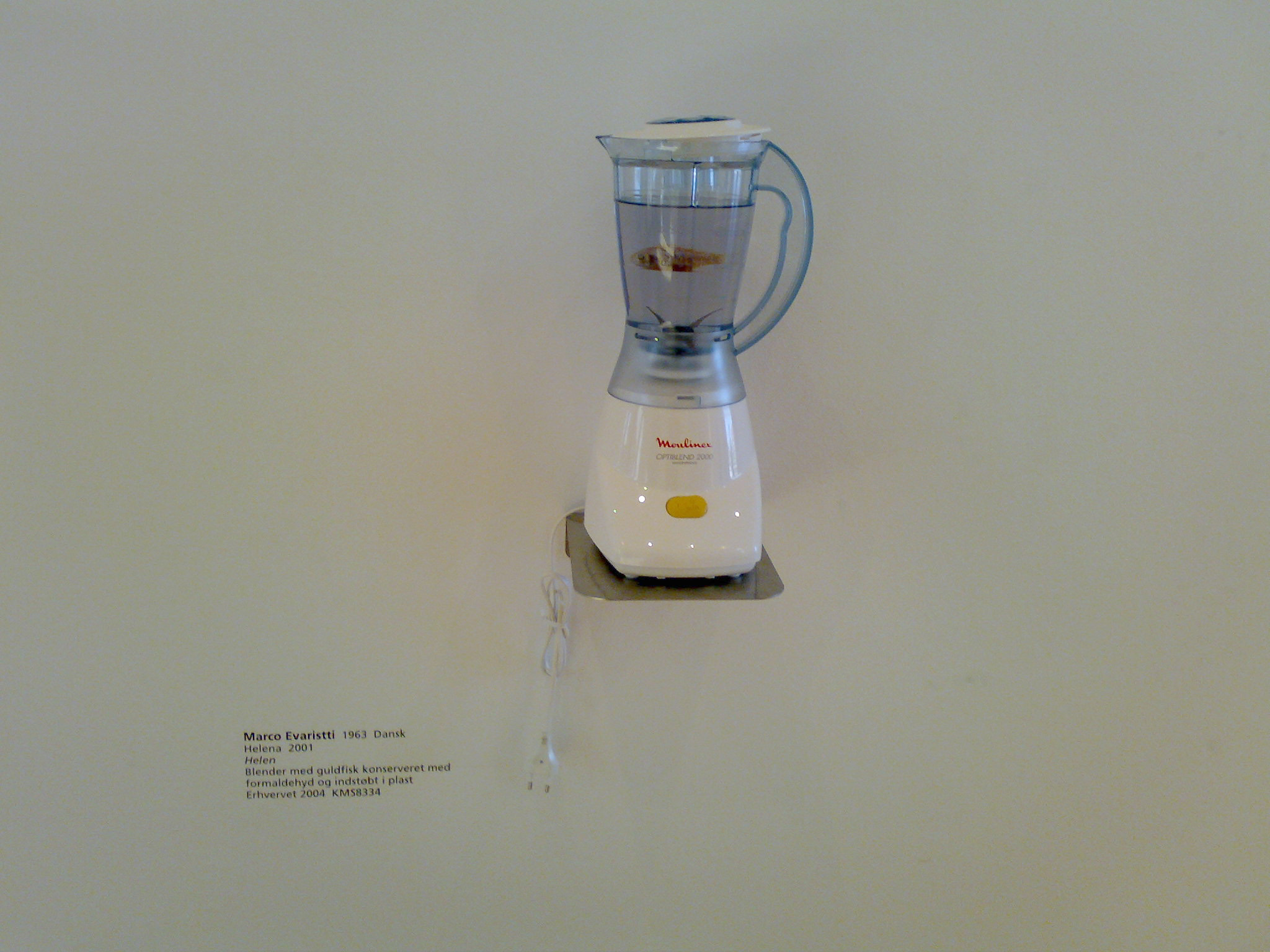
- A version of Helena
- Year: 2000

Helena was an art installation by Marco Evaristti originally at the Trapholt museum in 2000. The art consisted of a room with 10 blenders, each of which contained a green swordtail (often misreported as goldfish). The fish were vulnerable to any visitor to the exhibit who chose to turn on a blender and kill them.

During the exhibition two fish were killed in this way. Persons present at the initial exhibition of the installation noted that "numerous media representatives who were present... virtually encouraged the visitors to press the button in order to initiate a scandal". Legal complaints resulted in the blenders being unplugged, though the installation remained on display.

== Interpretation ==
One interpretation of the art is that humans have the power to destroy nature anywhere; not only in art galleries, but putting this choice in an art gallery makes that power more visible.

== Commentary ==
Various reviewers commented further on the work. A researcher remarked that the exhibit started intense discussion about animal rights and artistic freedom.

== Criminal charge ==
The director of the museum was charged with the crime of animal cruelty for hosting the exhibition, but did not receive a conviction.

== Following artwork ==
In 2008, Evaristti announced that he and musician Kenneth Thordal were planning another artwork involving goldfish, called FIVE2TWELVE. At this exhibition, the body of American death row inmate Gene Hathorn Jr. would be turned into freeze-dried fish food and placed in front of a pool of goldfish, and the audience would have to choose between feeding the fish with freeze-dried human meat and letting them starve to death. The plans were abandoned the following year, when Hathorn's sentence was commuted to three concurrent life sentences.
