= Federal Correctional Institution, La Tuna =

Low-security prison in Texas, US

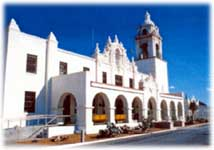
- Interactive map of Federal Correctional Institution, La Tuna
- Location: Anthony, El Paso County, Texas; 31°58′56″N 106°35′26″W
- Status: Operational
- Security class: Low-security (with minimum-security prison camp)
- Population: 965 (157 in prison camp)
- Managed by: Federal Bureau of Prisons

The Federal Correctional Institution, La Tuna (FCI La Tuna) is a low-security United States federal prison for male inmates in Anthony, Texas. It is operated by the Federal Bureau of Prisons, a division of the United States Department of Justice. A satellite prison camp, located adjacent to the facility, houses minimum-security inmates.

FCI La Tuna is located on the Texas-New Mexico border, 12 miles (19 km) north of El Paso, Texas.

== Letters from La Tuna ==
From May to September 2013, the El Paso Times published a series of letters written by Bob Jones, a longtime El Paso businessman serving a 10-year sentence on corruption and fraud convictions at FCI La Tuna. Known as "Letters from La Tuna," Jones wrote the letters to his family to "warn you and all of our loved ones and friends away from any misdeeds or illegal behavior" and give readers insight into the harsh consequences of breaking the law. In the first article, Jones described being detained in a private prison in Otero County, New Mexico after he was sentenced on February 17, 2011 and contracting E. coli bacteria from undercooked food and becoming ill with dysentery. Still sick, he was transferred to FCI La Tuna in May 2011:

I was loaded with nine other men into a van and taken to La Tuna Federal Correctional Institution, throwing up all the way. Once I was checked in, I was taken by wheelchair to my new home -- and a different type of hell in Unit 6 (handicapped unit) at La Tuna. The things that saved my life were my "cellies" (my cell mates, the other five men in the six-man cell that I was assigned to live in, a 10-by-10-foot room). These men fed me and wheeled me to the bathroom, food service (sometimes) and to the medical office.

Jones subsequently suffered kidney failure and was sent to a local hospital twice, each stay lasting about 30 days before he was sent back to FCI La Tuna. Jones wrote that while in the hospital, he was chained to the bed and was watched by guards 24 hours a day. However, Jones noted that the conditions at FCI La Tuna were better in comparison to the private prison he came from: "La Tuna is far more what I expected of prison -- food, guards, management bureaucracy" and added "the inmates [at FCI La Tuna] are mostly men who are in prison for far too long a term for their crimes."

== Notable inmates (current and former) ==
Inmate Name	Register Number	Photo	Status	Details
Lee Baca	73171-112		Released on August 23, 2022	Former Sheriff of Los Angeles County. Convicted of obstructing federal investigators.
Anthony Curcio	38974-086		Released from custody in 2013; served 6 years.	Former college football player and real estate investor; convicted in 2009 of masterminding an elaborate armored car heist, during which he wore a rip-away landscaper disguise, stashed an inner tube in a nearby creek, floated to a nearby getaway car and escaped with $400,000.
Max Hardcore	44902-112		Released from custody on July 19, 2011; served 2 and a half years.	American porn producer, director and performer. Was convicted on obscenity charges and sentenced to 46 months in prison.
Ira Isaacs	45196-112		Released from custody in 2017; served 26 months.	Pornographic film director. Convicted of five federal counts of selling and distributing obscene material in 2012.
George Jung	19225-004		Released from custody in 2014; served nearly 20 years.	Major player in the cocaine trade in the United States in the 1970s and early 1980s. Jung was a part of the Medellín Cartel, which was responsible for up to 89 percent of the cocaine smuggled into the United States. He specialized in the smuggling of cocaine from Colombia on a large scale. His life story was portrayed in the 2001 film Blow, starring Johnny Depp.
Pee Wee Kirkland			Released from custody in 1988; served 7 years.	American former streetball player and drug kingpin.
Nakoula Basseley Nakoula	56329-112		Released from custody in 2013; served 1 year.	Egyptian-born Coptic Christian; produced the anti-Islamic video Innocence of Muslims in 2012, which sparked violent protests in the Middle East; arrested for violating the terms of his probation from a 2010 check fraud conviction.
Steven Nigg	10896-089		Released from custody in February 2024.	Convicted of armed robbery, known famously for assaulting Jared Fogle at FCI Englewood.
Benjamin Hoskins Paddock			Escaped from custody in 1968.	Paddock's escape landed him on the FBI Ten Most Wanted Fugitives list where he would remain until 1977, making him one of the longest-tenured fugitives ever on that list. His son, Stephen Craig Paddock, carried out the 2017 Las Vegas shooting.
Nicodemo Scarfo	09813-050		Imprisoned in August 1982 and released from custody in January 1984.	"Little Nicky" Scarfo. La Cosa Nostra mafia boss of Philadelphia mob. Imprisoned on parole violation for gun possession (0.22 calibre handgun). Became friends with George Jung while imprisoned in La Tuna. Scarfo later was imprisoned on a separate 55-year sentence where he died of natural causes on January 15, 2017 at FMC Butner.
Joseph Valachi			Died in custody in 1971 while serving a life sentence.	In the 1963 Valachi hearings before the United States Senate, Valachi, an Italian-American Mafia lieutenant, disclosed previously unknown information about the Mafia including its structure, operations, rituals and membership. This was the first concrete evidence to federal authorities and the general public that the Mafia existed.
Henry Uliomereyon Jones	46810-112		Scheduled for release in October 2023.	Former record company executive; convicted in 2008 of mail fraud, wire fraud, and securities fraud for running a Ponzi scheme that caused 500 investors to lose over $32 million; the story was featured on the CNBC series American Greed.

== See also ==
- List of United States federal prisons
- Federal Bureau of Prisons
- Incarceration in the United States
