= Alexandra Quinn =

Canadian former pornographic actress

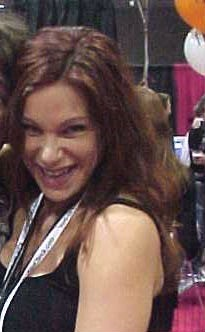
- Quinn in Las Vegas, January 2000
- Born: Diane Purdie Stewart; March 25, 1973 (age 53); Hamilton, Ontario, Canada
- Other names: Alexandra; Alexanderia Quinn; Alexandria Quinn; Dianne Colazzo
- Occupation: Pornographic actress
- Years active: 1989–1991; 2000–2006
- Height: 5 ft 8 in (1.73 m)

Alexandra Quinn (born Diane Purdie Stewart on March 25, 1973) is a Canadian former pornographic actress.

== Early life ==
Quinn was born in Hamilton, Ontario, Canada. She was a gymnast and jazz singer as a teenager.

== Career ==
Quinn emigrated from Canada with a falsified passport and entered the adult entertainment industry in the late 1980s, while she was underage by using a fake ID. She began stripping in Canada when she was 14. Two years later she met pornographic actress Erica Boyer and moved to Los Angeles with her. Quinn began performing in adult films at the age of 16 after Boyer introduced her to agent Jim South. Quinn misrepresented her birth year as 1968, which would have made her 22 at the time of her adult film debut. Her first scene was in the film Space Virgins, and it was a five-person group sex scene with two men and two other women, besides Quinn. She won the 1991 AVN Award for Best Group Sex Scene - Video alongside Sunny McKay & Rocco Siffredi for their performance in Buttman's Ultimate Workout. By November 1991 she had appeared in approximately 100 adult films, 60 of which were shot while she was still a minor.

=== Discovery of her real age ===
In 1991, Quinn forgot to bring her fake ID to an adult film shoot once and decided to use her real one instead, hoping that no one would notice. She had been working in the adult film industry for over a year but had only turned 18 seven months earlier. This discrepancy on her identification card revealed that she was underage in her earlier adult film appearances. On October 31, 1991, the adult film industry began to destroy the dozens of films she was featured in while she was still a minor. She had a breast augmentation surgery on the day of her 18th birthday, which made it easier to distinguish which films were shot while she was still underage and which ones were not.

The Quinn case is mentioned often, usually together with the Traci Lords underage porn case, in sociological studies and true crime books. These cases triggered a media debate which ended with the passing of the Communications Decency Act in 1996.

=== Hiatus and comeback ===
Quinn was unwelcome in the adult film industry after her real age was revealed. She later had a $3,500/week contract with the Centerfold strip club in Memphis, which was terminated on October 28, 1993, because, according to Quinn, she refused to allow patrons to touch her. In 1996 she contacted several adult-film production companies in an attempt to resume her career. It took her eight years, after her real age was discovered, to begin working in adult films again on a regular basis. During her eight-year hiatus she only appeared in five pornographic films. Nearing age 30, she began getting cast in the MILF genre in 2000. She was generally welcomed back into the adult film industry; however, Adam & Eve refused to distribute any films containing footage of her. She retired from adult films in 2006.

== Personal life ==
Quinn married the manager of a strip club called Tiffanies in Phoenix when she was 19 but divorced him four years later.

Quinn was a witness in the murder investigation of Christopher Walsh, which was featured in the true crime novel Nobody Walks.

== Awards ==
Year	Ceremony	Result	Category	Film	Ref.
1991	AVN Award	Won	Best Group Sex Scene - Video (with Sunny McKay & Rocco Siffredi)	Buttman's Ultimate Workout	
1991	XRCO Award	Won	Sex Scene Of The Year (with Sunny McKay & Rocco Siffredi)	Buttman's Ultimate Workout	
