= Bronson Canyon =

Canyon in Los Angeles, California, United States

Coordinates: 34.12287°N 118.31550°W

The East Portal

Bronson Canyon, or Bronson Caves, is a section of Griffith Park in Los Angeles that has become known as a filming location for many films and television series, especially Westerns and science fiction, from the early days of motion pictures to the present.

== Location and history ==
Bronson Canyon is located in the southwest section of Griffith Park near the north end of Canyon Drive, which is an extension of Bronson Avenue. In 1903, the Union Rock Company founded a quarry, originally named Brush Canyon, for excavation of crushed rock used in the construction of city streets–carried out of the quarry by electric train on the Brush Canyon Line. The quarry ceased operation in the late 1920s, leaving the caves behind. The caves became known as the Bronson Caves after the nearby avenue and a hill of that name, giving the area its more popular name of Bronson Canyon. The same street may have indirectly provided the stage name for actor Charles Bronson, as the former Charles Buchinsky is believed to have chosen that name in 1954 after seeing it on a street sign in Hollywood.

The craggy quarry remains are pockmarked by what appear to be cave openings, and therefore create an ideal backdrop for filming scenes meant to take place in a lonely southwestern wilderness. Scenes of the main cave entrance are normally filmed in a manner that shows the entrance at an angle because the cave is actually a very short tunnel through the hill, with the rear opening easily visible in a direct shot. The tunnel was used as the entrance to the Batcave in the 1966–68 Batman television series.

== Media with scenes filmed or set in the canyon ==
=== Films ===
- Lightning Bryce (1919)
- Riders of the Purple Sage (1925)
- The Lightning Warrior (1931)
- The Hurricane Express (1932)
- I Am a Fugitive from a Chain Gang (1932)
- White Zombie (1932)
- Sagebrush Trail (1933)
- The Three Musketeers (1933)
- The Vampire Bat (1933)
- Mystery Mountain (1934)
- The Phantom Empire (1935)
- Flash Gordon (1936)
- Robinson Crusoe of Clipper Island (1936)
- Zorro Rides Again (1937)
- Dick Tracy Returns (1938)
- Hawk of the Wilderness (1938)
- The Lone Ranger Rides Again (1939)
- Adventures of Captain Marvel (1941)
- Call of the Canyon (1942)
- Pirates of Monterey (1947)
- Silver River (1948)
- Atom Man vs. Superman (1949)
- Flame of Araby (1951)
- Unknown World (1951)
- Carson City (1952)
- Robot Monster (1953)
- Captain John Smith and Pocahontas (1953)
- Killers from Space (1954)
- Massacre Canyon (1954)
- Day the World Ended (1955)
- Crashout (1955)
- Invasion of the Body Snatchers (1956)
- The Lone Ranger (1956)
- It Conquered the World (1956)
- The Searchers (1956)
- Men in War (1957)
- The Brain from Planet Arous (1957)
- The Cyclops (1957)
- Attack of the Crab Monsters (1957)
- The Bride and the Beast (1958)
- Earth vs. the Spider (1958)
- Monster from Green Hell (1958)
- The Return of Dracula (1958)
- Teenage Caveman (1958)
- Night of the Blood Beast (1958)
- The Jayhawkers! (1959)
- Invisible Invaders (1959)
- Teenagers from Outer Space (1959)
- The Cape Canaveral Monsters (1960)
- Eegah (1962)
- Invasion of the Star Creatures (1962)
- The Magic Sword (1962)
- Ride the High Country (1962)
- The Gun Hawk (1963)
- They Saved Hitler's Brain (Madmen of Mandoras) (1963)
- The Human Duplicators (1965)
- Batman: The Movie (1966)
- Mondo Bizarro (1966)
- Flaming Frontier (1968)
- Head (1968)
- The Mighty Gorga (1969)
- Equinox (1970)
- Octaman (1971)
- Lost Horizon (1973)
- Flesh Gordon (1974)
- The Human Tornado (1976)
- The Choirboys (1977)
- The White Buffalo (1977)
- Deathsport 1978
- Raise the Titanic (1980)
- The Return (1980)
- The Legend of the Lone Ranger (1981)
- The Sword and the Sorcerer (1982)
- Fire and Ice (1983 film) (1983; live-action reference as well as Raleigh Studios)
- Dreamscape (1984)
- The Evil That Men Do (1984)
- Friday the 13th Part VI: Jason Lives (1986)
- Thrashin' (1986)
- Munchies (1987)
- Blood Diner (1987)
- The Wizard of Speed and Time (1989)
- Star Trek VI: The Undiscovered Country (1991)
- The Roller Blade Seven (1991)
- Army of Darkness (1992)
- Guns of El Chupacabra (1997)
- La Cucaracha (1998)
- George of the Jungle (1997)
- The End of Violence (1997)
- The Lost Skeleton of Cadavra (2001)
- Cabin Fever (2002)
- Fangs (2002)
- The Scorpion King (2002)
- Return to the Batcave: The Misadventures of Adam and Burt (2003)
- Tremors 4: The Legend Begins (2004)
- Vampire Blvd. (2004)
- Diabolical Tales (2007)
- D-War (2007)
- Princess of Mars (2009)
- Mega Python vs. Gatoroid (2010)
- Mega Shark Versus Crocosaurus (2010)
- The Whisperer in Darkness (2011)
- Baseball's Last Hero: 21 Clemente Stories (2013)
- B.C. Butcher (2016)
- Hail, Caesar! (2016)
- Time Trap (2017)
- Under the Silver Lake (2018)
- Butt Boy (2019)
- Palm Springs (2020)

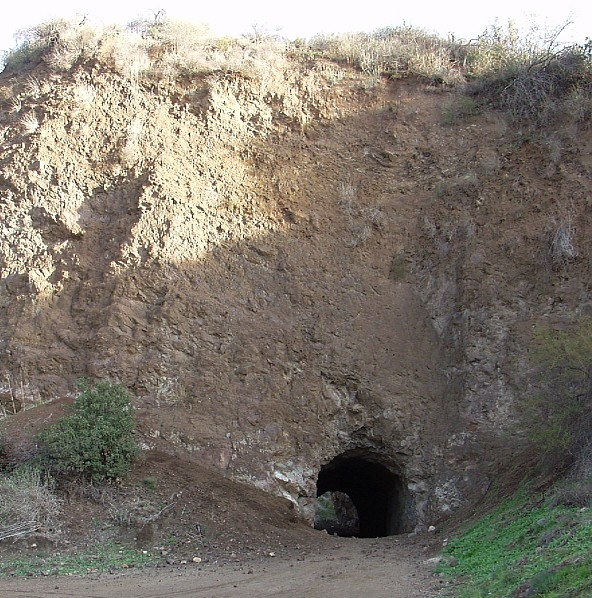
The West Portal that was used as the entrance to the Batcave in the 1960s TV series Batman

=== TV series ===
- The A-Team
- The Guns of Will Sonnet
- The Adventures of Brisco County, Jr.
- The Adventures of Rin Tin Tin
- Alias Smith and Jones
- Bat Masterson
- Batman
- Beauty and the Geek
- Bonanza
- Cannon (TV series) ("The Set Up" E92)
- Combat!
- Crazy like a fox ("fox in wonderland")
- The Dukes of Hazzard ("Hazzard Connection")
- Falcon Crest
- Gunsmoke
- Have Gun – Will Travel
- Iron Horse ("The Man from New Chicago" S01E10)
- Knight Rider ("Mouth of the Snake" S02E21+22)
- The Last Ship
- Little House on the Prairie
- The Lone Ranger
- Masked Rider
- Mighty Morphin Power Rangers
- Mission: Impossible (1960s)
- Murder, She Wrote (1980s)
- Power Rangers In Space
- Power Rangers Lightspeed Rescue
- Power Rangers Lost Galaxy
- Power Rangers Time Force
- Power Rangers Turbo
- Power Rangers Wild Force
- Power Rangers Zeo
- The Monkees
- The Old Man
- The Outer Limits (1960s)
- Perry Mason (1960s)
- Rawhide
- Salute Your Shorts ("Clan of the Cavegirls" S02E11)
- Star Trek: Deep Space Nine
- Star Trek: Enterprise
- Star Trek: The Next Generation
- Star Trek: The Original Series
- Star Trek: Voyager
- Tombstone Territory
- Twin Peaks
- V
- VR Troopers
- The Virginian
- The Wild Wild West ("Night of the Returning Dead" S02E05)
- Wonder Woman

=== Novels ===
- Lost Light by Michael Connelly
- Dreambound by Dan Frey

== See also ==
- Vasquez Rocks, another Los Angeles County landmark used as a location in numerous films and television episodes
- Ballona Creek § Tributaries and drains
