= The Rock n' Roll Cops =

- The Rock n' Roll Cops DVD Cover
- Directed by: Scott Shaw
- Written by: Scott Shaw; Donald G. Jackson
- Produced by: Scott Shaw; Donald G. Jackson
- Starring: Scott Shaw; Julie Strain; Kevin Eastman; William Smith; Robert Z'Dar
- Cinematography: Donald G. Jackson
- Edited by: Jake Dharma
- Music by: D.J. Acid X
- Release date: August 18, 2003
- Running time: 90 minutes
- Country: United States
- Language: English

The Rock n' Roll Cops, also known as Rock n' Roll Cops 2: The Adventure Begins, is a 2003 martial arts action film directed by Scott Shaw. The film stars Scott Shaw, Kevin Eastman, Julie Strain, Robert Z'Dar and William Smith. The film was co-produced by Donald G. Jackson who also plays a small role in the movie.

== Plot ==
"The plot is pretty straightforward. A couple of cops (Scott Shaw and David Heavener) are trying to discover who Mr Big is. They also enjoy the police brutality. It turns out that one of the cops is in tight with Mr Big. Eventually they end up discovering that Mr Big is a guy named Rinaldi (long-time Hollywood actor William Smith), who is a friend of the police Commissioner (Donald G. Jackson)." Julie Strain plays a fortune teller in this film.

== Cast ==
- Scott Shaw as Jake Blade
- David Heavener as Bonzarelli
- Kevin Eastman as Hack
- William Smith as Rinaldi
- Robert Z'Dar as Dieter
- Julie Strain as Stella
- Ann Marie Lynch as Kelly Phalin
- Slain Wayne as Spivey (credited as Eric Brummer)
- Collin Gillis as Uri
- Donald G. Jackson as The Commander
- Samantha Phillips as Ophelia
- Nancy Vee as Shop Assistant
- Dee as Herself
- Lydia Schone

== Zen Filmmaking ==
This feature film is considered a Zen Film in that it was created in the distinct style of filmmaking created by Scott Shaw, known as Zen Filmmaking. In this style of filmmaking no scripts are used.

== Distribution ==
The DVD release of this film is titled The Rock n' Roll Cops, whereas the VHS/video tape release of this film has the title Rock n' Roll Cops 2: The Adventure Begins.
