= Pocket Ninjas =

- DVD Cover
- Directed by: Donald G. Jackson; David Huey; Dave Eddy
- Written by: Mark Williams (Screenplay); Dave Eddy (Tree house); David Huey (Sonic Virtual Reality, Balloon Factory)
- Produced by: David Huey (as David Hue); Richard Rabago; Suzanne De Laurentis
- Starring: Robert Z'Dar; Richard Rabago; Gary Daniels
- Cinematography: Dwight F. Lay
- Music by: Arlan H. Boll
- Distributed by: Daru Film Group (South Africa); Screen Pix Home Video, Simitar Entertainment, and Universal Music and Video Distribution (United States)
- Release date: March 25, 1997 (U.S. VHS)
- Running time: 90 minutes (Foreign versions); 85 minutes (United States)
- Country: United States
- Language: English

Pocket Ninjas is a 1994 action film starring Robert Z'Dar, Richard Rabago, and Gary Daniels. Based on a screenplay by Mark Williams, the film was directed by Donald G. Jackson, David Huey and Dave Eddy.

== Cast ==
- Robert Z'Dar as Cobra Khan
- Richard Rabago as "Spike"
- Gary Daniels as The White Dragon
- Sondi as Tanya
- Brad Bufanda as Steve (credited as Bradley Joseph)
- Joseph Valencia as Damien
- Mel Novak as Mr. Kaufman
- Rick Rabago as Cubby Khan (credited as Rick Rubago)
- Lelagi Togisala as "Slag" (credited as Lelegi 'Butch' Togisla)
- Suzanne Henningar as Suzanne Simmons
- Donna Simoneau as Harpy / Amy
- Ron Hall as Black Knight / Commando Dragon
- William Christopher Ford as Blue Ninja (credited as Chris Ford)
- Luther Yee as Mr. Moto
- Keri Sutman as Schoolgirl
- Nadia Nassar as Schoolgirl
- Kerisha Revis as Schoolgirl

== Development ==
Pocket Ninjas was originally entitled Skate Dragons and the original screenplay was by Mark Williams. The film was made by Cine Excel Entertainment, who also made Future War. The film was intended to be a children's version of The Roller Blade Seven that would showcase Jacksons' "Roller Cam" cinematography and "Zen Film-making" style. However, Jackson was replaced when executive producer Huey felt the "Zen Film-making" style was not working. Eddy was brought in to create a wrap around for the Jackson and Huey footage.

I was financed by a company who wanted children's films. So, what I did, was give them the Donald G. Jackson version of a children's film - weird. These films were all script based. I would come up with the story and they were written by Mark Williams.

— Donald G. Jackson

== Release history ==
Pocket Ninjas was first released to the foreign markets in 1994. It was released on VHS in the United States in 1997 by Screen Pix Home Video. The DVD was released by Simitar Entertainment in 1999 and re-released by Universal Music and Video Distribution in 2004.
