= William Smith (American actor) =

American actor and stuntman (1933–2021)

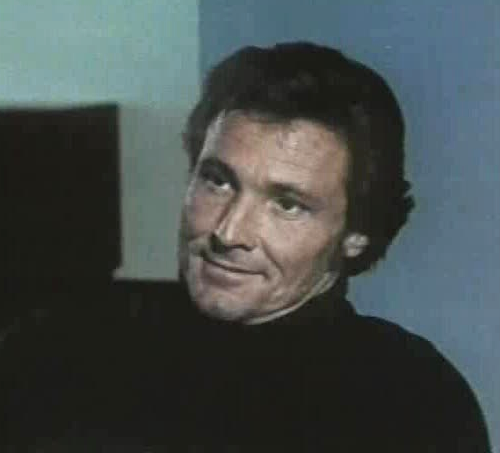
- Smith in Invasion of the Bee Girls (1973)
- Born: William Emmett Smith; March 24, 1933; Columbia, Missouri, U.S.
- Died: July 5, 2021 (aged 88); Los Angeles, California, U.S.
- Other names: Bill Smith; Big Bill
- Education: University of California, Los Angeles
- Occupation: Actor
- Years active: 1942–2020
- Spouses: Michele Smith (m. 1969; div. 1989) Joanne Cervelli (m. 1989)
- Children: William E. Smith III; Sherri Anne Cervelli
- Website: williamsmith.us

William Emmett Smith Jr. (March 24, 1933 – July 5, 2021) was an American actor and stunt performer. His career spanned nearly 80 years across film and television, often in imposing or villainous character roles.

Smith starred as Texas Ranger Joe Riley on the Western television series Laredo (1965-67), and played the menacing Anthony Falconetti in the acclaimed television mini-series Rich Man, Poor Man (1976) and Rich Man, Poor Man Book II (1976-77). He played prominent roles in films like Any Which Way You Can (1980), Conan the Barbarian (1982), Rumble Fish (1983), and Red Dawn (1984). He was also a leading man in several exploitation and action films, during the 1970s and 1990s.

== Early life and education ==
Smith was born on March 24, 1933, in Columbia, Missouri, to William Emmett Smith and Emily (Richards) Smith and grew up on their cattle ranch. His sister was actress Joy Windsor.

His family later moved to Southern California, where he began his acting career at the age of eight in 1942, entering show business as a child actor in such films as The Ghost of Frankenstein, The Song of Bernadette and Meet Me in St. Louis.

He earned a master's degree in Russian from the University of California, Los Angeles, where he also competed in discus throwing. While working on his doctorate, Smith was offered a contract with MGM that would redirect his career. During the 1950s, Smith also worked as a lifeguard and a volunteer firefighter.

=== Military service ===
Smith enlisted in the United States Air Force in 1951. A fluent Russian speaker, during the Korean War Smith was a Russian Intercept Interrogator and flew secret ferret missions over the Russian SFSR and was also a military language instructor. He was reportedly also fluent in French, German and Serbo-Croatian.

== Career ==
From 1961 to 2014, Smith established himself as a prolific and talented character actor with roles in a diverse range of genres. Although often typecast as an anti-social personality, he sporadically got the opportunity to prove his effectiveness in other kinds of roles as a law enforcement officer or an anti-heroic protagonist. He was a regular on the 1961 ABC television series The Asphalt Jungle, portraying police Sergeant Danny Keller. In 1964, he appeared in the episode "The Rope of Lies" as Bill, a ranch hand from the Shiloh Ranch in the NBC television series The Virginian. He appeared in the 1964 Wagon Train episode "The Bob Stuart Story" and also gave a moving performance as the orphaned Native American valet who rails against violence opposite Guy Stockwell in "The Richard Bloodgood Story" S8 E10 which aired on 11/28/1964. One of his earliest leading roles was Joe Riley, a good-natured Texas Ranger with arms of steel on the NBC western series Laredo (1965–1967). Smith guest starred as Jude Bonner on James Arness's long-lived western Gunsmoke in a 1972 episode, "Hostage!"; his character abducts, beats, and apparently rapes (off-screen) Amanda Blake's character, Miss Kitty Russell, and shoots her twice in the back. Smith has been described as the "greatest bad-guy character actor of our time".

Smith joined the cast of the final season of Hawaii Five-O as Detective James "Kimo" Carew, a new officer in the Five-O unit. He had previously appeared with Jack Lord in Stoney Burke. Smith starred in one episode each of the Adam West Batman TV series (in the episode "Minerva, Mayhem and Millionaires" as Adonis, one of the minions of the title guest villainess portrayed by Zsa Zsa Gabor), I Dream of Jeannie (in the episode "Operation: First Couple on the Moon" as Turk Parker), Kung Fu and as The Treybor, a ruthless warlord, in the Buck Rogers in the 25th Century episode "Buck's Duel to the Death". Smith also made guest appearances opposite James Garner in the 1974 two-hour pilot for The Rockford Files (titled "Backlash of the Hunter") and George Peppard in The A-Team (in two appearances as different characters, in the first season's "Pros and Cons" and the fourth season's "The A-Team Is Coming, The A-Team Is Coming"). In the 1976 television miniseries Rich Man, Poor Man, he portrayed Anthony Falconetti, nemesis of the Jordache family, and reprised the role in the sequel, Rich Man, Poor Man Book II.

Other 1970s TV appearances included the Kolchak: The Night Stalker episode "The Energy Eater", as an Indian medicine man who advises Kolchak, and an early Six Million Dollar Man episode "Survival of the Fittest" as Commander Maxwell. He also appeared in the 1979 miniseries The Rebels as John Waverly; in an episode of The Dukes of Hazzard as Jason Steele, a bounty hunter hired by Sheriff Rosco P. Coltrane to frame the Duke Boys into jail; and an episode of Knight Rider as Harold Turner, the manipulative leader of a hellish biker gang whom Michael Knight (David Hasselhoff) has to outsmart.

On the big screen, Smith became the star of several cult feature films in the early 1970s. He appeared as heavy Terry Bartell in Darker than Amber in 1970. In the fist fight scene that ends the film, Rod Taylor hit Smith (who was playing the villain) who retaliated in kind, and a staged-fight scene became a real fight as the cameras continued to roll. Smith later reported that Taylor was "a very tough guy" who broke three of his ribs while he broke Taylor's nose.

Also in 1970, Smith featured in two biker flicks Nam's Angels (originally released under the title "The Losers") co-starring Bernie Hamilton and C.C. and Company, the latter of which was directed by Seymour Robbie and written by Roger Smith. He starred in 1972's Grave of the Vampire as James Eastman and in 1973's Invasion of the Bee Girls, and 1975's The Swinging Barmaids.

In 1972 and 1975, respectively, he appeared in two popular Blaxploitation films, Hammer and Boss Nigger, both with Fred Williamson. In 1972, he appeared in a Columbo episode "The Greenhouse Jungle" as Ken Nichols, a handsome swindler who may be a person of interest in Columbo's murder investigation. After that, he appeared as a vindictive sergeant in Twilight's Last Gleaming (1977), as a drag-racing legend in Fast Company (1979), as the title character's father in Conan the Barbarian (1982) (a movie in which he was also briefly considered for the lead role), as bad guy Matt Diggs in The Frisco Kid (1979), as Clint Eastwood's bare-knuckle opponent Jack Wilson in 1980's Any Which Way You Can and had the top villainous role as a Soviet Spetsnaz commander in 1984's Red Dawn.

In 1983, Smith appeared in two films from Francis Ford Coppola in The Outsiders as a store clerk and in Rumble Fish as a police officer. In 1985, he landed the starring role of Brodie Hollister in the short-lived Disney Western series Wildside and another role as the bookmaker Dutchman's strongarm enforcer known simply as "Panama Hat", in director Richard Brooks's final movie, Fever Pitch (1985).

From the late 80's on and into the new millennium, Smith's icy stare, physique and continuous essaying of scene-stealing character villainy continued in a string of B-features and direct-to-video productions. Many were continuing collaborations with filmmakers he had worked with years prior along with other character players who also achieved cult status in their own right. Such names include Robert Z'Dar, Joe Estevez, Tim Thomerson, James Drury, Lloyd Kaufman, Gary Graver, Wolf Larson and Jürgen Prochnow.

In 2002, Smith voiced Draaga, an alien gladiator, in the Justice League episode "War World".

Although it was reported that Smith retired in 2014, he made a cameo appearance in Jon Stewart's film Irresistible (2020).

== Other activities ==
An avid athlete and lifelong bodybuilder, Smith was a record holder for reverse-curling his own body weight. His trademark arms measured as much as 18 1/4 inches, and he was a one-time training partner of Larry Scott. In 2010, he was inducted into the Muscle Beach Venice Hall of Fame.

Smith studied Kung Fu San Soo, and earned a black belt in American Kenpo Karate from Ed Parker.

Smith held a 31–1 record as an amateur boxer. He won the 200-pound (91 kg) arm-wrestling championship of the world multiple times, also winning the United States Air Force weightlifting championship. He briefly played semi-pro American football in Wiesbaden, Germany, and competed in amateur alpine skiing.

In 2009, Smith published a collection of poetry, The Poetic Works of William Smith.

== Personal life ==
Smith was married twice, and had two children, William Smith III and Sherri Anne Cervelli.

=== Death ===
Smith died at the Motion Picture & Television Country House and Hospital in Los Angeles on July 5, 2021, at the age of 88.

== Selected filmography ==
- 1942 The Ghost of Frankenstein as Village boy in courtroom (uncredited)
- 1943 The Song of Bernadette as Sleeping Boy (uncredited)
- 1944 Going My Way as Choir Member (uncredited)
- 1944 Meet Me in St. Louis as Little Boy (uncredited)
- 1945 A Tree Grows in Brooklyn as Boy (uncredited)
- 1946 Gilda as Boy (uncredited)
- 1947 I Wonder Who's Kissing Her Now as Young Boy (uncredited)
- 1948 The Boy with Green Hair as Boy (uncredited)
- 1951 Saturday's Hero as Minor Role (uncredited)
- 1958 High School Confidential as Minor Role (uncredited)
- 1959 The Mating Game as Barney
- 1959 Ask Any Girl as Young Man (uncredited)
- 1959 Girls Town as Man (uncredited)
- 1959 Never So Few as MP Officer #1 (uncredited)
- 1959 The Gazebo as Actor Who Trips Over Camera (uncredited)
- 1961 Go Naked in the World as Minor Role
- 1961 The Asphalt Jungle (TV Series) as Sergeant Danny Keller
- 1961 Atlantis, the Lost Continent as Captain of The Guard
- 1962 Zero One (TV Series) as Jimmy Delaney
- 1964 Mail Order Bride as Lank
- 1964 The Alfred Hitchcock Hour (TV Series) as Tommy Lad - Episode: "The McGregor Affair"
- 1964 36 Hours as Guy (uncredited)
- 1965 Laredo (TV Series) as Joe Riley
- 1968 I Dream of Jeannie (TV Series) as Turk Parker - Episode: "Operation: First Couple on the Moon"
- 1968 Batman (TV Series) as Adonis - Episode: "Minerva, Mayhem and Millionaires"
- 1968 Three Guns for Texas as Ranger Joe Riley
- 1969 The Over-the-Hill Gang as Amos
- 1969 Run, Angel, Run! as Angel
- 1970 Nam's Angels as Link Thomas
- 1970 Angels Die Hard as Tim
- 1970 Darker than Amber as Terry
- 1970 C.C. and Company as Moon
- 1970 Crowhaven Farm as Patrolman Hayes
- 1971 Mission: Impossible (TV Series) as Vincent Sandler - Episode: "A Ghost Story"
- 1971 Summertree as Draft Lawyer
- 1971 Chrome and Hot Leather as T.J.
- 1972 The Thing with Two Heads as Hysterical Condemned Man
- 1972 Hammer as Brenner
- 1972 Piranha, Piranha as Caribe
- 1972 Grave of the Vampire as James Eastman
- 1972 The Runaway as Frank
- 1973 The Fuzz Brothers (TV Movie) as Sonny
- 1973 Gentle Savage as John Allen, Camper
- 1973 Sweet Jesus, Preacherman as Martelli
- 1973 Invasion of the Bee Girls as Neil Agar
- 1973 The Last American Hero as Kyle Kingman
- 1973 The Deadly Trackers as Schoolboy
- 1973 A Taste of Hell as Jack Lowell
- 1973 Kung Fu (TV Series) as Capt Luther Stagger - Episode: "The Chalice"
- 1974 The Sex Symbol (TV Movie) as Butch Wischnewski
- 1974 Policewomen as The Karate Instructor
- 1974 Black Samson as Giovanni "Johnny" Nappa
- 1974 Planet of the Apes (TV Series) as Tolar - Episode: "The Gladiators"
- 1974 Kolchak: The Night Stalker (TV Series) as Jim Elkhorn - Episode: "The Energy Eater"
- 1974 Win, Place or Steal as Tom
- 1974 The Rockford Files (TV Series) as Jerry Grimes - Episode: "Backlash of the Hunter"
- 1975 Boss Nigger as Jed Clayton
- 1975 The Swinging Barmaids as Lieutenant Harry White
- 1975 The Ultimate Warrior as "Carrot"
- 1975 Dr. Minx as Gus Dolan
- 1975 S.W.A.T. (TV Series) as disgruntled stuntman "Cowboy" - Episode: "Time Bomb"
- 1976 Scorchy as Carl Henrich
- 1976 Rich Man, Poor Man (Television Miniseries) as Anthony Falconetti
- 1976 Rich Man, Poor Man Book II (Television Miniseries) as Anthony Falconetti
- 1976 Hollywood Man as Rafe Stoker
- 1977 Twilight's Last Gleaming as Hoxey
- 1978 Blood and Guts as Dan O'Neil
- 1978 Blackjack as Andy Mayfield
- 1978 Fantasy Island (TV Series) as Wyatt Earp - Episode: "The Funny Girl/Butch and Sundance"
- 1979 VEGA$ (TV Series) as Jack Avery - Episode: "Demand and Supply"
- 1979 The Frisco Kid as Matt Diggs
- 1979 Seven as Drew Savano
- 1979 The Rebels (Television Miniseries) as John Waverly
- 1979 Fast Company as Lonnie "Lucky Man" Johnson
- 1979 Hawaii Five-O (TV Series) as Detective James "Kimo" Carew
- 1980 Buck Rogers in the 25th Century as The Trebor - Episode: "Buck's Duel to the Death"
- 1980 Any Which Way You Can as Jack Wilson
- 1980 CHiPs (TV Series) as Michael Adams - Episode: "E.M.T.", and as Stan - Episode: "Satan's Angels"
- 1981 The Dukes of Hazzard as Jason Steele - Episodes: "10 Million Dollar Sheriff: Part 1" and "10 Million Dollar Sheriff: Part 2"
- 1981 B. J. and the Bear as John Cooley - Episodes: "The Fast and the Furious: Part 1" and "The Fast and the Furious: Part 2"
- 1982 Conan the Barbarian as Conan's father
- 1982 Matt Houston (TV Series) as J.D. Harris - Episode: "Who Would Kill Ramona?"
- 1982 The Fall Guy (TV Series) as Salem - Episodes: "License to Kill: Part 1" and "License to Kill: Part 2"
- 1983 Rumble Fish as Officer Patterson
- 1983 Simon & Simon (TV Series) as Cady - Episode: "I Heard It Was Murder"
- 1983 The A-Team (TV Series) as Jase Tataro - Episode: "Pros and Cons"
- 1983 The Outsiders as The Store Clerk
- 1983 Knight Rider (TV Series) as Harold T. Turner - Episode: "Short Notice"
- 1984 The Jerk, Too as Suicide
- 1984 Red Dawn as Colonel Strelnikov
- 1985 T.J. Hooker (TV Series) as R.K. 'Blood' Henderson - Episode: "Outcall"
- 1985 Wildside (TV Series) as Brodie Hollister
- 1985 The Mean Season as Albert O'Shaughnessy
- 1985 When Nature Calls as The Husband ("Gena's Story" trailer)
- 1985 Fever Pitch as "Panama Hat"
- 1986 Airwolf (TV Series) as Steele - Episode: "The Girl Who Fell from the Sky"
- 1986 Murder, She Wrote (TV Series) as Clyde Thorson - Episode: "Deadline for Murder"
- 1986 Eye of the Tiger as "Blade"
- 1987 Commando Squad as Morgan Denny
- 1987 Moon in Scorpio as Burt
- 1987 The Badd One as Badd
- 1988 Bulletproof as Russian Major
- 1988 Platoon Leader as Major Flynn
- 1988 Maniac Cop as Captain Ripley
- 1988 Hell on the Battleground as Colonel Meredith
- 1988 Hell Comes to Frogtown as Captain Devlin / Count Sodom
- 1988 Evil Altar as Reed Weller
- 1988 Memorial Valley Massacre as General Mintz
- 1989 Jungle Assault as General Mitchell
- 1989 Slow Burn as Antonio Scarpelli
- 1989 Action U.S.A. as Conover
- 1989 Empire of Ash III as Lucas
- 1989 Terror in Beverly Hills as The President
- 1989 L.A. Vice as Captain Joe Wilkes
- 1989 East L.A. Warriors as Martelli
- 1989 B.O.R.N. as Dr. Farley
- 1989 Deadly Breed as Captain
- 1990 Instant Karma as Pop
- 1990 Emperor of the Bronx as Fitz
- 1990 Cartel as Mason
- 1990 Chance as Captain Joe Wilkes
- 1990 The Final Sanction as Major Galashkin
- 1990 Forgotten Heroes as General Gregori Zelenkov
- 1991 Spirit of the Eagle as Hatchett
- 1991 Kiss and Be Killed as Detective Murdoch
- 1991 The Roller Blade Seven as Pharaoh
- 1991 Hard Time Romance
- 1991 Cybernator as Colonel Peck
- 1991 The Last Riders as "Hammer"
- 1992 American Me as Deacon
- 1992 Shadow of the Dragon as Eric Brunner
- 1992 The Legend of the Roller Blade Seven as "Pharaoh"
- 1992 Legend of Skull Canyon as Charlie "Conchos Charlie"
- 1992 Feast as Detective George Bordelli
- 1992 Dark Secrets as Robert
- 1992 A Mission to Kill as Boris Catuli
- 1993 Merchant of Evil as Victor Fortunetti
- 1993 Road to Revenge as Normad
- 1994 Maverick as Riverboat Poker Player
- 1994 Due South (TV Series) as Harold Geiger - Episode: "Manhunt"
- 1994 Manosaurus as Sheriff Todd
- 1994 Taken Alive as L.E.
- 1995 Raw Energy as Sam Stompkins
- 1995 Judee Strange as Judee
- 1995 Big Sister 2000 as The Man
- 1996 Uncle Sam as Major
- 1997 Hollywood Cops as Rinaldi
- 1997 The Shooter as Jerry Krants
- 1997 Interview with a Zombie as Zombie
- 1997 Doublecross on Costa's Island as L.E.
- 1998 Broken Vessels as Bo
- 1998 Warriors of the Apocolypse as Moon
- 1998 No Rest for the Wicked as Frank Love
- 1999 Wasteland Justice as Moon
- 2000 Vice as "Spooky" Harlow
- 2000 Plastic Boy and the Jokers as Dr. Taylor
- 2001 The Elite as Colonel Shaw
- 2002 Neon Signs as Clyde
- 2003 The Rock n' Roll Cops as Rinaldi
- 2003 God Has a Rap Sheet as Lucifer
- 2004 Y.M.I. as Cal
- 2004 Killer Story as Monty – 'The Wrap'
- 2006 Voices from the Graves as Lester Jiggs
- 2006 Inner Rage as Sam
- 2007 Rapturious as Sheriff
- 2008 Body Shop as Sheriff Taggart
- 2012 Tiger Cage as Boris Katunik
- 2014 Island of Witches as Vladislav Titov
- 2020 Irresistible as Hofbrau Bar Fly
