= Camp Midnite =

1989 American TV talk show

- Presented by: Dick Wilson
- Country of origin: United States
- Original language: English

Production
- Running time: 90 minutes
- Production company: Dick Clark Productions

Original release
- Network: USA Network
- Release: January 6, 1989 – June 1989

Camp Midnite is a Friday late night, 90-minute variety/talk show on the USA Network in 1989. Its twenty-four episodes were hosted by Dick Wilson, a radio personality from Kansas City, Missouri (not to be confused with Dick Wilson, the actor who played "Mr. Whipple" in commercials).

The show featured skits that were done by cast members Tony Forkush and Caroline Schlitt. They did take-offs on television series such as Love Connection and Gilligan's Island, as well as celebrities Michael Jackson and Dustin Hoffman in "Singing in the Rainman".

The series was produced by Dick Clark Productions and its music provided by Scooter Pietsch.

== Format ==
The show was set to look like it took place on the backstage side of another TV show, and generally had an intentionally "cheap" feel meant to distinguish it from equivalent programs. There was a coffee maker behind the host and members of the audience were encouraged to get up in the middle of the show and get themselves a cup of coffee. Guests on the show were encouraged to sign a styrofoam cup and bite the cup to leave a dental record for future identification if needed. The cups of all guests where displayed on the wall behind the host. Each show included calling a local L.A. restaurant and ordering food for the audience members. Dick Clark appeared on the first show and took a pie in the face from the host.

== Production ==
The show's writers included Tim Conway Jr., Warren Bell, David Hirsch, Tim Maile, and Gary Basmajian. The production coordinator was Mark Walberg.

The producers were Dick Clark and Larry Klein.

== Broadcast history ==
Camp Midnite premiered on January 6, 1989, and was one of two respective shows that replaced Night Flight on Fridays and Saturdays; USA Up All Night starring Gilbert Gottfried was the other. After Camp Midnite ended its run about half-way through 1989, cast member Caroline Schlitt was given her own Friday night edition of USA Up All Night, before she was ultimately replaced by Rhonda Shear a year and a half later in January 1991; Up All Night lasted until 1998.
