= Conrad Brooks =

American actor (1931–2017)

- Born: Conrad Biedrzycki; January 3, 1931; Baltimore, Maryland, U.S.
- Died: December 6, 2017 (aged 86); Martinsburg, West Virginia, U.S.
- Occupation: Actor
- Years active: 1948–2016
- Spouse: Ruth Marilyn Biedrzycki
- Children: 1 daughter

Conrad Brooks (born Conrad Biedrzycki; January 3, 1931 – December 6, 2017) was an American actor. He was known for his many appearances in the 1950s films of cult director Ed Wood.

== Career ==
Born Conrad Biedrzycki on January 3, 1931, in Baltimore, Maryland, Brooks was the son of Polish immigrants, Victor and Katherine Biedrzycki. His father was a baker. Brooks was one of eight children.

He moved to Hollywood, California, in 1948 at age 17, along with his brothers Harry and Ted, attempting to break into acting. Brooks first encountered the legendary filmmaker Ed Wood in a donut shop, and eagerly agreed to appear in a short western film Wood was planning to direct. Brooks entered show business by acting in such Ed Wood cult classics as Plan 9 from Outer Space, Glen or Glenda, Bride of the Monster, Night of the Ghouls, The Sinister Urge and Jail Bait. He appeared in more Ed Wood films than any other actor in fact. He also appeared briefly as an airplane pilot in The Beast of Yucca Flats (1961).

Brooks took a break from acting during the 1960s and 1970s, but due to the later revived interest in the films of Ed Wood, he re-emerged in the 1980s and became a prolific actor in low-budget films. He even went on to write, produce and direct several films.

Along with Gregory Walcott, Brooks appeared briefly in Tim Burton's film Ed Wood, playing a bartender, while his own character was played by Brent Hinckley. Brooks was a frequent guest at the Mid-Atlantic Nostalgia Convention and I-Con at Stony Brook University, where he signed autographs for his fans.

He made a cameo appearance as the pianist for the Sound The Surrender music video by heavy metal band, Darkest Hour. When The Sinister Urge episode of Mystery Science Theater 3000 was released on DVD, Brooks filmed a special introduction. Brooks was interviewed in two documentaries about Ed Wood, Flying Saucers Over Hollywood: The Plan 9 Companion (1992) and The Haunted World of Edward D. Wood Jr. (1995).

Brooks teamed up again with filmmaker Jonathan M. Parisen on two films, Toilet Gator and Space Vampires from the Planet Blood, and a television show, Blast Corrigan: Rocketship To Earth.

Brooks was founder and owner of Conrad Brooks Productions, which has produced the Gypsy Vampire series, starring Bruce "Porkchop" Lindsay as Count Lugo, as well as the "Jan-Gel" film trilogy.

Brooks continued acting well into his 80s, making an appearance in a 2015 remake of Plan 9 from Outer Space. He made his last appearance in the 2016 film Don't Let the Devil in.

Brooks was married to Ruth Marilyn Biedrzycki (December 21, 1923 - April 8, 2016) from the late 1960s until her death. They had one daughter.

== Death ==
Brooks, who suffered from prostate cancer, died of complications from sepsis on December 6, 2017, in Martinsburg, West Virginia, at age 86. At the time of his death, Brooks resided in nearby Inwood, West Virginia.

== Selected filmography ==
- Jalopy (1953) as Party Guest (uncredited)
- Glen or Glenda (1953) as Banker / Reporter / Pickup Artist / Bearded Drag
- Clipped Wings (1953) as Recruit (uncredited)
- Jail Bait (1954) as Medical Attendant / Photographer (uncredited)
- The Mad Magician (1954) as Bonfire Extra (uncredited)
- Bride of the Monster (1955) as Suspect Outside Office (uncredited)
- Plan 9 from Outer Space (1959) as Policeman
- The Sinister Urge (1960) as Connie
- Night of the Ghouls (1959) as man in Fight (uncredited)
- Mystery in Shadows (1960, Short, Director, Producer, Writer) as Bob Ryan
- Bob and Run (1960, TV Movie) as Bob
- The Beast of Yucca Flats (1961) as man at Airfield
- Girl Madness (1961)
- Hellborn (1961)
- The Young and the Immoral (1961)
- A Polish Vampire in Burbank (1983) as Bartender
- Deathrow Gameshow (1987) as Judge
- Curse of the Queerwolf (1988) as Wally Beaver
- Young Rebels (1989) as Drug Boss
- On the Trail of Ed Wood (1990, Documentary) as himself
- F.A.R.T. the Movie (1991) as Game Show Panelist
- Shadow of the Dragon (1992) as Officer Singer
- Flying Saucers Over Hollywood: The Plan 9 Companion (1992, Documentary) as himself
- Hellborn (1993, Writer) as himself / Connie
- Test Tube Teens from the Year 2000 (1994) as Janitor
- Ed Wood: Look Back in Angora (1994, Documentary) as himself
- Ed Wood (1994) as Bartender
- Conrad Brooks vs. the Werewolf (1994, Short) as himself
- Baby Ghost (1995) as Elliot
- The Haunted World of Edward D. Wood Jr. (1995) as Himself
- Bikini Drive-In (1996) as Oscar
- Misfit Patrol (1996) as Officer Buford Murphy
- Toad Warrior (1996) as Swamp Farmer
- The Saturn Avenger Vs. the Terror Robot (1996, Short) as Doc
- Shotgun Boulevard (1996) as Rinaldi
- Rollergator (1996) as Swamp Farmer
- Blood Slaves of the Vampire Werewolf (1996, Director) as Monk
- Snuff Films: An Exposé (1996, Short) as himself
- Guns of El Chupacabra (1997) as Deputy Reins
- Dalziel and Pascoe: Deadheads (1997, TV Series) (uncredited)
- The Ironbound Vampire (1997) as Ambrose
- Ice Scream (1997) as Ricky
- Alien Agenda: Under the Skin (1997) as Sal Pantangilo (segment "Unsavory Characters")
- I Woke Up Early the Day I Died (1998) as Cruiser Cop #3
- Hollywood Mortuary (1998) as himself
- Creaturealm: From the Dead (1998) as himself (segment "Hollywood Mortuary")
- Armageddon Boulevard (1999) as Godfather Rinaldi
- The Atomic Space Bug (1999) as Mr. Donaldson
- Silent Scream (1999) as Silent Screen Villain
- The Beast of Retro City (1999)
- Ghost Taxi (1999)
- Jan-Gel, the Beast from the East (1999, Director, Producer, Writer) as himself
- Transylvania Police; Monster Squad (2000)
- The Vampire Hunters Club (2001, Video short) as Conrad
- The Monster Man (2001) as Lord Gideon
- El Cerebro de Hitler! (2001) as Babbling Drunkard
- Max Hell Frog Warrior (2002) as Swamp Farmer
- Raising Dead (2002) as Police Chief Arbogast
- Pacino Is Missing (2002) as Blind Camera Operator
- Bikini Planet (2002) as Vice-President
- Attack of the Giant Gull (2002)
- Zombiegeddon (2003) as Dean Martinson
- Minds of Terror (2003) as Doctor
- Jan-Gel 3: Hillbilly Monster (2003, Director, Executive Producer) as Dirty Harry
- Corpses Are Forever (2004) as Mr. Fairbrass
- Dr. Horror's Erotic House of Idiots (2004) as Conrad Andrews
- Brain Robbers from Outer Space (2004) as Officer Jamey
- Super Hero Central (2004) as Laslo Mauser
- Bob's Night Out (2004) as Crazy Cop
- Gypsy Vampire (2005, Director) as Cap
- That's Independent! (2004, Documentary) as himself
- The Demon Monster from Outer Space (2005)
- 2020 An American Nightmare (2005, Executive Producer) as Dad
- 9mm Sunrise (2006) as Mr. Rinaldi
- Purvos (2006) as Professor Jessup
- Zeppo: Sinners from Beyond the Moon! (2007) as Dept of Defense chief Brooks
- Vampira: The Movie (2007, Consultant)
- Gypsy Vampire 2 - Gypsy Vampire's Revenge (2007, Director)
- Blast Corrigan: Rocketship To Earth (2008)
- Toilet Gator (2008)
- Freaky Vampire (2008, Director)
- A Taste of Desperation (2009) as The Landlord
- It Came from Trafalgar (2009) as Wid Hawk
- Shadows in the Woods (2009, Co-Director)
- Space Vampires from the Planet Blood (2009)
- Beside the Manor Selby (2010) as The Gardener
- Zombie on the Loose (2010, Director)
- The Girl (2011) as Elderly Gentleman
- Invasion of the Reptoids (2011) as Elderly Gentleman
- The Fun in Funeral (2011) as Freddy Prince
- Terror of the Giant Tentacle (2013)
- Psychotic State (2014) as Grandpa
- Plan 9 (2015) as Jamie
- Bite School (2015) as Conrad
- Pitfire of Hell (2016) as UFO Spotter
- Killer Waves (2016) as Marvin
- Subconscious Reality (2016) as The Seer
- Don't Let the Devil In (2016) as Mr. Taylor
- Toilet Gator (2017) as Walter Vonleer
- Abaddon (2018) as Hippie
- Midnight Massacre (2018) as Grandfather Anthony
- Ghost of El Chupacabra (2019)
