= Return to Frogtown =

Frogtown II (Return to Frogtown)
- Directed by: Donald G. Jackson
- Written by: Donald G. Jackson
- Produced by: Scott Pfeiffer
- Starring: Robert Z'Dar; Denice Duff; Lou Ferrigno
- Cinematography: Donald G. Jackson
- Edited by: Chris Roth
- Music by: Robert Garrett
- Release date: 1993
- Running time: 87 min.
- Country: United States
- Language: English

Return to Frogtown (also known as Frogtown II) is a 1993 B movie directed by Donald G. Jackson. It is the sequel to the 1988 cult film Hell Comes to Frogtown. Like its predecessor, the film is set in a post-apocalyptic future where mutant frog-people are at war with mankind.

== Plot ==
Set some years after the events of the first movie, Captain Delano (Charles Napier) sends Sam Hell to infiltrate Frog Town again to rescue Texas Rocket Ranger John Jones (played by Lou Ferrigno) who crash landed. In what may be a direct reference to his Incredible Hulk fame, Jones is an unwilling test subject who is modified and turned into a frog-person, giving him superhuman strength. The tests are conducted by Professor Tanzer (Brion James) and Nurse Cloris (Linda Singer).

This is part of a larger plot by the Evil Star Frogmeister to turn all humans into frogmen. Hell must journey to the Frogtown Mutant Reservation in a desperate attempt to stop the planned mutation.

== Cast ==
- Robert Z'Dar as Sam Hell
- Denice Duff as Dr. Spangle
- Kelsey as Commander Toty
- Michael Nyman as Frog
- Linda Singer as Nurse Cloris
- Lou Ferrigno as Ranger John Jones
- Don Stroud as Brandy Stone
- Brion James as Professor Tanzer
- Charles Napier as Captain Delano
- Rhonda Shear as Fuzzy
- Ken Davitian as Bud
- Brad Baker as Frog Guard

== Production ==
Robert Z'Dar plays the main character, Sam Hell, in place of Roddy Piper. Notable co-stars of the cast include: Don Stroud, Brion James, Charles Napier, Rhonda Shear. The movie was followed by Max Hell Frog Warrior. Filmmaker Jackson claimed New World Pictures interfered with the picture.

== Reception ==
Received two out of five stars in Creature Feature. TV Guide gave the movie one star out of five, greatly preferring the original film.
