= Scott Shaw =

Scott Shaw may refer to:

- Scott Shaw (artist) (born 1951), American cartoonist, animator, and historian of comics
- Scott Shaw (author) (born 1958), American filmmaker, author and martial artist
- Scott Shaw (American football) (born 1974), American football player
