= Vampire Blvd. =

- Vampire Blvd. Video Box Cover
- Directed by: Scott Shaw
- Written by: Scott Shaw
- Produced by: Scott Shaw
- Starring: Scott Shaw; Kevin Thompson; Joe Estevez; Robert Z'Dar; Adrienne Lau
- Cinematography: Donald G. Jackson; Scott Shaw; Hae Won Shin
- Edited by: Jake Blade
- Release date: January 15, 2004
- Running time: 90 minutes
- Country: United States
- Language: English

Vampire Blvd. is a 2004 vampire film directed by and starring Scott Shaw. This co-stars of this film include Kevin Thompson, Joe Estevez, Robert Z'Dar, Adrienne Lau and Jill Kelly.

== Hollywood ==
Similar to many Scott Shaw films Vampire Blvd. utilities Hollywood, California as a cinematic backdrop.

== Zen Filmmaking ==
This film is considered a Zen Film in that it was created in the distinct style of filmmaking formulated by Scott Shaw known as Zen Filmmaking. In this style of filmmaking no scripts are used.
