= Soultaker =

Soultaker may refer to:

- Soultaker (EP), a 2009 EP by Blutengel
- Soultaker (film), a 1990 American film
- The SoulTaker, a Japanese anime television series
- The Soultaker (wrestler), or Charles Wright (born 1961), American professional wrestler
- Soultaker, a fictional sword of the DC Comics character Katana
