= Soultaker (film) =

1990 horror fantasy film

- DVD artwork
- Directed by: Michael Rissi
- Screenplay by: Vivian Schilling
- Story by: Eric Parkinson; Vivian Schilling
- Produced by: Connie Kingrey; Eric Parkinson
- Starring: Joe Estevez; Vivian Schilling; Gregg Thomsen; Chuck Williams; Robert Z'Dar; David "Shark" Fralick
- Cinematography: James Rosenthal
- Edited by: Jason Coleman; Michael Rissi
- Music by: Jon McCallum
- Production companies: Pacific West Entertainment Group; Victory Pictures
- Distributed by: Action International Pictures
- Release date: October 26, 1990
- Running time: 94 minutes
- Country: United States
- Language: English
- Budget: $250,000
- Box office: $43,982

Soultaker is a 1990 American fantasy horror film written by Vivian Schilling and directed by Michael Rissi. It stars Joe Estevez in the title role, alongside Schilling, Gregg Thomsen, Chuck Williams, Robert Z'Dar, and David "Shark" Fralick. The film follows a group of young adults who try to flee from the titular "Soultaker" when their souls are ejected from their bodies after a car accident. Inspired by discussions with Action International Pictures producer Eric Parkinson, the script was based on a real-life car accident which Schilling was involved in.

The film was shot in five weeks on a $250,000 budget. Originally planned for a direct-to-video release, it saw limited theatrical screenings, with eight prints distributed in United States. Since its release, the film has received negative reviews, but won the Saturn Award for "Best Genre Video Release" in 1992. A sequel was planned, and actors such as James Earl Jones and Faye Dunaway were named for the cast, but the film was never made and Schilling turned its premise into a novel which was titled Quietus, published in 2002. Soultaker was featured in the tenth-season premiere episode of the comedy television series Mystery Science Theater 3000 in 1999.

== Plot ==
During a summer festival, the Angel of Death (Robert Z'Dar) instructs his "Soultaker" subordinate (Joe Estevez) to kill five people: Zack (Gregg Thomsen), Zack's friends Brad (David "Shark" Fralick) and Tommy (Chuck Williams), Brad's girlfriend Candice (Cinda Lou Freeman), and Zack's ex-girlfriend Natalie (Vivian Schilling). After Natalie's friend leaves her behind, Zack offers her a ride home in Brad's car, although Brad is high on cocaine and reluctant to accept her as a passenger. Driving home at high speed, Brad crashes the car to avoid hitting the Soultaker. Candice dies instantly while Natalie, Brad, Zack, and Tommy fall comatose as their souls leave their bodies. The Soultaker then takes Candice's soul and informs the Angel of Death, who orders him to recover the other souls. Thinking they survived the crash, the four return to the car, unaware their bodies were taken to a hospital. There, Soultaker reveals himself and claims Brad's soul; the others, helpless to stop him, flee.

They run into a convenience store and attempt to tell the cashier – who cannot see them – that someone is after them. While inside, they see a news report on the crash, which confuses them, and Natalie accuses Zack of knowing Brad had been using drugs. They leave the store and call emergency services, but the operator cannot hear them and hangs up on them. Appearing again, the Soultaker tries to claim Natalie's soul, but her resemblance to his past lover, whom he killed in his former life, stays his hand. Zack rescues her and they flee, leaving Tommy behind. The Angel of Death reprimands his subordinate for failing to take her soul, and the Soultaker then takes Tommy's.

Zack and Natalie go to her house, where they tell her mother Anna (Jean Reiner) about the Soultaker. Zack and Natalie reconcile while Anna prepares a bath for her. While she bathes, Anna watches her from behind the bathroom door. Meanwhile, Zack learns from a live television announcement from Natalie's father Mayor Grant (David Fawcett) that their life support systems will be turned off at midnight. During the broadcast, Anna appears onscreen; at the same time, the "Anna" watching Natalie suddenly morphs into the Soultaker. He attempts to make a pact with her, offering her eternal life on the condition that she stays by his side forever. Zack arrives and attempts to attack the Soultaker, but is overpowered. Natalie tries to shoot the Soultaker to no effect. When she tells the Soultaker she wants to be with Zack, the Soultaker throws him out of the window. Zack survives the fall.

Hoping to return to their bodies before midnight, Natalie and Zack flee to the hospital. Natalie is captured by the Soultaker on an elevator which leads to the afterlife; he claims he is an angel charged with collecting souls. He convinces her there is nothing left for her in the living realm, that Zack is already dead, and that she can be saved if she stays with him. While searching for her, Zack encounters Brad, who has become a Soultaker, as those who kill someone – even by accident – must pay for it with service as a grim reaper. With Brad's help, he enters the afterlife and rescues Natalie. Brad gives him two empty "soul rings", which can help him and Natalie return to their bodies.

They find Natalie's body, and she places herself in the ring but remains comatose. Discovering that her pendant is acting as a barrier between her soul and her body, Zack pulls her soul from her body to reattempt the process when the Soultaker reappears. After a chase around the hospital, Zack escapes by leaping off the roof. The Soultaker is confronted by the Angel of Death, who tells him that he has failed since it is now past midnight. Despite his pleas, the Soultaker is imprisoned into a soul ring by his master. Zack returns to his body and saves Natalie's life; he later visits her when she is discharged from the hospital.

== Cast ==
- Joe Estevez as The Soultaker (listed as "The Man" in film credits)
- Vivian Schilling as Natalie McMillan
- Robert Z'Dar as The Angel of Death
- Gregg Thomsen as Zack Taylor
- David "Shark" Fralick as Brad Deville (Listed as "David Shark")
- Jean Reiner as Anna McMillan
- Chuck Williams as Tommy Marcetto
- David Fawcett as Mayor Grant McMillan
- Gary Kohler as Sergeant Haggerty
- Dave Scott as Officer Mel
- Cinda Lou Freeman as Candice

== Production ==
Soultaker was written by Vivian Schilling, who was inspired to write the film after discussions with Action International Pictures producer Eric Parkinson. Schilling based her script on a real-life car accident that happened to her and a friend. The script was written in the span of four months. Actor Joe Estevez was asked to play the mayor, Grant McMillan, before being cast as the titular "Soultaker". As well as writing the script for the film, Schilling played the female lead Natalie McMillan. This was Schilling's first starring role in a film. Her previous acting credits included Fred Olen Ray's science fiction film Prison Ship and a nurse in the soap opera General Hospital.

When I was 18, just out of high school, I went to a party with a girlfriend. A guy offered us a ride home, someone we thought we knew pretty well. He didn't look wasted or anything, but when we got in the car he started driving really crazy. We were going very fast and hit a tree; I was in the front seat and was literally buried in the dashboard. It was bad. For a moment as I was sitting there. I thought I was going to die. I always felt lucky to have lived through that, but it also made me wonder. What if I was supposed to die and didn't know it?

— Vivian Schilling, Fangoria

Soultaker was shot in Mobile, Alabama, in five weeks with a budget of $250,000. In early 1989, 26-year-old Michael Rissi was hired to direct the film after the previous director left the project. Soultaker was his first main feature; he had previously directed the 1987 short film Snake Eyes, part of the anthology movie Terror Eyes Eric Parkinson and Vivian Schilling were involved with. Originally reluctant to direct, Rissi decided to join after being interested in filming a movie involving parallel universes. Rissi's contributions to the film resulted in its being released as "A Michael Rissi Film" for both the promotional material and film credits. Production wrapped in July 1989. Action International Pictures bought the movie, which became its biggest movie at that time.

Problems mounted during production. During the filming of the car-crash scene, the car could not be started, causing the loss of a half-day's production. In an interview with Femme Fatales, Vivian Schilling noted that almost a third of the script had to be re-written because of time and money constraints. Schilling later wrote an article for the magazine about a scene added by investors and the film crew, in which she was asked to appear naked. Despite claims it would increase sales for the film, Schilling avoided appearing nude in the scene.

== Release ==
Soultaker was distributed by Action International Pictures. Originally planned to be released straight to video, it received a limited theatrical release; eight prints of it were distributed in the United States on October 26, 1990. Because Action International Pictures did not have a theatrical distribution division, Eric Parkinson did the process by himself. Vivian Schilling said the movie was successful in theaters except her hometown, Wichita, Kansas. She also mentioned it selling well on VHS and in overseas markets. Soultaker was released on VHS on January 24, 1991. It was also released on DVD by Image Entertainment in 1999 and Hannover House in 2005.

=== Reception ===
Critical reception for Soultaker has been mostly negative, with criticism directed at the film's story and special effects. Los Angeles Times writer Mark Chalon Smith unfavorably compared Soultaker to 1968's Night of the Living Dead, both of which were made with a small budget. Smith said having a small budget "doesn't necessarily mean a movie can't be fun and scary", but that Soultaker was not fun. Blockbuster Entertainment gave the film two stars, while VideoHound's Golden Movie Retriever by Jim Craddock gave it one and a half stars. TV Guide gave it one star, criticizing the storyline and special effects while describing the acting as "adequate". It would later be on IMDb's "Bottom 100" list.

Variety's Larry Cohn spoke positively about Soultaker, writing that its portrayal of the afterlife was more consistent than the 1990 Academy Award-winning film Ghost. Time Out called the film a "micro-budget variation on Ghost", criticizing the special effects and Michael Rissi's direction but praising Vivian Schilling for her work. Michael Dare of Billboard directed praise towards the film in his review, calling it a "good looking, low-budget fantasy thriller", though he noted the cast's overacting and the movie's transformation into "several layers of advanced silliness" after the Angel of Death's introduction. In 1992, the film won the "Best Genre Video Release" award during the 18th Saturn Awards.

In his 2011 book Horror Films of the 1990s, John Kenneth Muir gave the movie two stars, noting the "apparent egotism" Schilling had, being both the screenwriter and lead. Robert Z'Dar and Joe Estevez were both criticized for not being as menacing as they intended to be. He also compared Soultaker to Ghost and Flatliners, all three films released in 1990 and shared the same theme of a universal hierarchy that is not seen. He considered Soultaker's interpretation of the theme to be the "cheesiest" of the three but mentioned that the movie had fewer resources to work with.

== Legacy ==
=== Sequel ===
A sequel was planned for the movie; it went through several name changes, including "Dark Angel" and "Dark World". Producers planned to cast James Earl Jones and Faye Dunaway in one iteration of the production, and Donald Sutherland was also in talks. Robert Z'Dar commented that William Shatner was interested in playing the boss of Z'Dar's character. Director Tibor Takács was due to direct the project, and production was planned for January 1993 in Canada. However, the project fell through due to funding issues. The concept of the unmade script was turned into a novel; Schilling said she "embellished the premise" and added new characters to the story. Titled Quietus, the book was released in January 2002 as her second novel and was published by Hannover House, having taken seven years to write.

=== Mystery Science Theater 3000 ===
Soultaker was featured in the tenth-season premiere episode of Mystery Science Theater 3000 (MST3K), a comedy television series whose premise is that the character Mike Nelson and his two robot friends Crow T. Robot and Tom Servo are forced to watch bad films as part of an ongoing scientific experiment. Broadcast on the Sci-Fi Channel on April 11, 1999, the episode also saw the guest appearances of series creator and original host of MST3K Joel Hodgson as Joel Robinson and Frank Conniff as TV's Frank. Jokes comparing Vivian Schilling to Tonya Harding were made. Schilling did not watch the episode but did not like the comparisons with Harding. John Kenneth Muir cited the movie's appearance in the episode as causing the movie to have a "bad movie" reputation, despite initial positive reviews.

The episode was considered one of the best episodes in the series, both by critics and by fans of the show. Erik Adams from The A.V. Club called it one of the most essential episodes, opining that Joel Hodgson's appearing in it was a "stamp of approval" for the show after he left its production. Jim Vorel for Paste ranked it as the 44th best in the entire series, calling the film an "overdramatic vanity project from the starlet/screenwriter" and praising the episode both for its riffing and for its host segments. A fan poll for the top 100 best episodes in the series voted it as eighteenth, the highest for a season ten episode. Writer Gavin Jasper lists Soultaker as one of the best horror episodes of the series. Elliott Kalan, the head writer for the Netflix era of the series, placed it as one of his favorite episodes in the series. Charles Bramesco for The Dissolve cited both Soultaker and later MST3K "experiment" Future War for increasing the popularity of Robert Z'Dar.

In 2009, Shout! Factory released the MST3K episode as part of the "Volume XIV" DVD collection of the series, along with The Mad Monster, Manhunt in Space, and Final Justice. Joe Estevez was interviewed for the DVD. In 2016, Shout! announced it had lost the rights to the Soultaker episode, resulting in "Volume XIV" going out of print.
