= Max Hell Frog Warrior =

- Directed by: Donald G. Jackson; Scott Shaw
- Written by: Donald G. Jackson; Scott Shaw
- Produced by: Donald G. Jackson; Scott Shaw
- Starring: Scott Shaw; Joe Estevez; Conrad Brooks; Jill Kelly
- Release date: 1996
- Running time: 90 minutes
- Country: United States
- Language: English
- Budget: $375,000

Max Hell Frog Warrior also known as Toad Warrior is a 1996 martial arts sci fi cult film written, produced, and directed by Donald G. Jackson and Scott Shaw. This film is the third in the Hell Comes to Frogtown series, following the cult films Hell Comes to Frogtown and Return to Frogtown. Initially developed under the title Toad Warrior, the film gained its current title for its 2002 release. The story was co-conceived by Donald G. Jackson, creator of the Frogtown franchise. The film stars Scott Shaw, Joe Estevez, Conrad Brooks, and Jill Kelly.

== Plot ==
In an alternative world overrun by a plague of frogs, the samurai Max Hell sets out to rescue Dr. Trixi T from the villain Mickey O'Malley.

"Shaw stars as Max Hell in this no-budget mess that doesn’t really have much to do with earlier Frogtown movies. He uses a samurai sword and seems irresistible to women. The plot involves some renegade scientist about to detonate a bomb that’ll turn everyone into toads."

"Jackson and Shaw codirected 1996's Toad Warrior, which taps one of their other obsessions: amphibian ninjas. We're in an alternate universe set during the Third Toad Resistance, in which Joe Estevez is the president, who lives in a tent with dirt-covered babes. Shaw fights ninjas in a car park. Old Ed Wood player Conrad Brooks wears a beekeeper's getup and sleeps while a purple alligator talks to him."

This film follows the lead character, Max Hell, played by Scott Shaw, who goes on a mission to rescue Dr. Trixi T from the clutches of the evil Mickey O'Malley, played by Joe Estevez. According to Donald G. Jackson, Max Hell Frog Warrior is not so much a sequel as it is a standalone film inspired by the original concept for Hell Comes to Frogtown.
