= Tony Zarrindast =

Iranian American filmmaker (1934–2016)

- محمد زرین‌دست
- Born: Mohammad Zarrindast; 1933 or 1934; Tabriz, Iran
- Died: November 29, 2016 (aged 82); Tehran, Iran
- Occupations: Film producer, film director, and cinema actor

Tony Zarrindast (Persian: محمد زرین‌دست also known as Mohammad Zarrindast) was an Iranian American film producer, film director, and cinema actor. He was considered by some as the "Persian Ed Wood". His 1996 film Werewolf was featured on an episode of Mystery Science Theater 3000. Zarrindast graduated from University of California, Los Angeles in the field of cinema. His brother was Alireza Zarrindast. On November 29, 2016 he died from cancer.
