= Vivian Schilling =

American novelist

- Born: February 15, 1968 (age 58); Wichita, Kansas, U.S.
- Education: Lee Strasberg Theater Institute
- Occupations: Novelist; actress; filmmaker
- Website: vivianschilling.com

Vivian Schilling (born February 15, 1968) is an American novelist, screenwriter, actress, and independent filmmaker.

== Biography ==
Born and raised in Kansas, Schilling studied at the Lee Strasberg Theater Institute and also under Stella Adler before embarking upon careers in literature and film. Most recently, Schilling completed work for Paris-based Eurocine Films as the writer, producer, and director of the English dub of Toys in the Attic, based on the stop-motion animated feature by Czech director Jiří Barta.

Schilling has written two novels: Quietus and Sacred Prey. The novels take place in a supernatural setting and center on themes of immortality, existentialism, and religious conflict.

Schilling has acted in a variety of leading roles in independent films since 1986, including Savage Land and the Polish film Niemcy, a World War II drama based on the stage play by Leon Kruczkowski. In Niemcy, Schilling portrays heroine Ruth Sonnenbruch, a German nightclub singer, who comes to the aid of a Jewish refugee. In 2006 she portrayed feminist and author Gertrude Atherton opposite Campbell Scott's Ambrose Bierce in the film anthology Ambrose Bierce: Civil War Stories. In 2012, Schilling provided the voice of Buttercup in Toys in the Attic alongside co-stars Forest Whitaker, Joan Cusack, and Cary Elwes.

Schilling wrote and starred in Soultaker, a 1990 theatrical release which went on to win Best Home Video Release at the 18th Saturn Awards.

Toys in the Attic was released theatrically in September 2012 and received top accolades from The New York Times, the Los Angeles Times, USA Today and the New York Post, among others, as well as major animation publications such as Animation Magazine.
