= Don't Let the Devil In =

Don't Let the Devil in
- Directed by: Courtney Fathom Sell
- Written by: Courtney Fathom Sell
- Produced by: Courtney Fathom Sell; Marc Slanger
- Starring: Mark Slanger; Jordan Lewis; Mark Baker; Conrad Brooks; Mark Ashby; Anthony J. Anastasio; Bill Guthrie; Andrew Whalen
- Cinematography: Brian Slanger
- Edited by: Courtney Fathom Sell
- Music by: Courtney Fathom Sell; Dusty Santamaria; Heather Elle; Landon Webb
- Production companies: Show Video Productions, Vortex Video
- Release date: October 2016 (New York)
- Running time: 88 minutes
- Country: United States
- Language: English

Don't Let the Devil in is a 2016 American thriller and psychological horror film written and directed by Courtney Fathom Sell. The film became the official Film in Residency at Facets Distribution for the entire month of November in 2016. It stars Marc Slanger, Jordan Lewis, Mark Baker and Conrad Brooks in his last performance. Sell coined the term "Appalachiasploitation" referring to the film's style.

== Plot ==
The film focuses on a married couple who have moved to a small Appalachian town in hopes of saving their new, yet already troubled, marriage. The husband, John, is to set up a casino, but he's been warned that the townspeople will not be welcoming. This warning proves to be true, as they start to experience several harrowing events after moving into their new home.

== Production ==
Don't Let the Devil In was mostly self-financed by Sell and Slanger; additional investors were brought on near the film's completion. The movie was filmed in Frostburg, Maryland, New York City, Marion, Massachusetts, West Virginia and Mattapoisett Massachusetts, and principal photography wrapped in late 2016. The film was based on a short film Sell and Slanger made years earlier entitled House on the Edge of Hell, which was shot on a Flip Cam for 27 dollars. Sell has stated that his inspiration for the film, which was his first budgeted feature, came from movies such as Race with the Devil, All the Colors of the Dark, Dellamorte Dellamore and Morbo.

Sell composed the entire soundtrack, which he created during the production's writing stage. He has stated that the music of Goblin was a large inspiration on his composing.

== Release ==
Don’t Let the Devil In received a limited theatrical release in 2016 and was released to VOD on October 3, 2017. On September 18, 2017 a collectors edition VHS was released of the film.

== Reception ==
HorrorNews.net was critical, writing that "If you are simply looking for an 85 minute collection of visuals, some gloriously lacking in verbiage, this addition to the B canon would be right in your blood-spattered dungeon. The jaded critic in me was just left wanting a bit more." Horror magazine Scream was more favorable, stating that "Overall, Don’t Let the Devil In is a moody slice of small town paranoia with political undertones that might give some viewers something to ponder, even if it won’t necessarily leave their spine tingling. But its mystery is engaging enough to maintain interest until the end and it’ll undoubtedly please fans of horror fare pertaining to cults and bizarre communities." CinemaCrazed commented that the film was "boring" but that it "shows promise for the future of Courtney Fathom Sell."
