= Undercover X =

- Undercover X
- Directed by: Scott Shaw
- Written by: Scott Shaw; Richard Magram
- Produced by: Scott Shaw; Hae Won Shin
- Starring: Scott Shaw; Richard Magram; Hae Won Shin; Reiko; Satoshi Nakagawa; Kevin Thompson
- Cinematography: Anthony Claverie; Jake Dharma; Hae Won Shin
- Edited by: Jake Dharma
- Music by: DJ Acid X
- Release date: 3 August 2001
- Running time: 90 minutes
- Languages: English; Japanese

Undercover X is a 2001 action-adventure film that was directed by and stars Scott Shaw.

== Plot ==
"In the 2001 film Undercover X (aka No Boundaries), Shaw plays an undercover LAPD detective named Truck Baker, a cross between action star Chuck Norris and The Dude from The Big Lebowski. He's laid-back, but he can also tear your head off with his bare hands. Newcomer Richard Magram plays Shaw's hyperactive partner Torino, who rambles on and on like Joe Pesci after four cups of espresso."

The feature was filmed in Hollywood, California, Seoul, South Korea, Tokyo and Kamakura, Japan.

This film is considered a "Zen Film" in that it was created in the distinct style of filmmaking formulated by Scott Shaw known as Zen Filmmaking. In this style of filmmaking, no scripts are used.
