= R. J. Kizer =

American film director (1952–2026)

- Born: Robert James Kizer Jr. September 27, 1952; New York City, U.S.
- Died: August 12, 2026 (aged 73); Los Angeles, California, U.S.
- Occupations: Director; editor
- Years active: 1979–2020

Robert James Kizer Jr. (September 27, 1952 – August 12, 2026) was an American film director and editor. He directed Hell Comes to Frogtown, Godzilla 1985, and edited Galaxy of Terror.

Born in New York City and raised in Fanwood, New Jersey, Kizer graduated from Union Catholic Regional High School. He attended film school at the New York University Tisch School of the Arts, graduating in 1976. In 1978, he moved to Los Angeles, California. Later, he began working at Roger Corman's New World Pictures.

Kizer died of glioblastoma in Los Angeles, California on August 12, 2026, at the age of 73.
