= Hell Comes to Frogtown =

1988 film directed by Donald G. Jackson

- Theatrical release poster
- Directed by: R. J. Kizer; Donald G. Jackson
- Screenplay by: Randall Frakes
- Story by: Donald G. Jackson; Randall Frakes
- Produced by: Donald G. Jackson; Randall Frakes
- Starring: Roddy Piper; Sandahl Bergman; Cec Verrell; William Smith; Rory Calhoun
- Cinematography: Donald G. Jackson; Enrico Picard
- Edited by: R. J. Kizer; James Matheny
- Music by: David Shapiro
- Distributed by: New World Pictures
- Release date: January 1988
- Running time: 88 minutes
- Country: United States
- Language: English
- Budget: $1.5 million

Hell Comes to Frogtown is a 1988 American science fiction action film directed by Donald G. Jackson and R. J. Kizer, and written by Jackson and Randall Frakes. The film stars professional wrestler Roddy Piper as Sam Hell, one of the last remaining fertile men in a post-apocalyptic world populated by both humans and mutant amphibians. The film's cast also includes Sandahl Bergman, Cec Verrell, William Smith and Rory Calhoun.

Hell Comes to Frogtown was followed by two sequels: Return to Frogtown (1993) and Max Hell Frog Warrior (1996).

== Plot ==
In the late 20th century, a large-scale nuclear war ends in a nuclear holocaust. In the aftermath, Earth has become a post-apocalyptic wasteland, where, due to fallout, most humans have been rendered sterile. As a result, the government places a high priority on those who can still breed. Additionally, humanity now shares the planet with a race of mutant amphibians, whom the government has exiled to the desert and prohibited from possessing firearms.

Sam Hell, a nomadic scavenger, is recruited by the provincial government to serve as a human stud—they tracked him down by following a trail of pregnant women left in his wake from his travels, and have determined that he is one of few remaining fertile men in existence. A protective codpiece that monitors Hell's physiosexual condition is affixed to his groin and secured by an electronic lock. Upon learning that the mutant amphibians have armed themselves and taken a group of fertile human women hostage, Hell is ordered to infiltrate the mutant city (derogatorily referred to as "Frogtown") and rescue and impregnate the women. He is accompanied by nurse Spangle and corporal Centinella.

During their journey to Frogtown, Hell attempts to escape, but quickly learns that the codpiece will shock his genitals if he strays too far from Spangle. Despite their rocky start and Spangle's initial cold demeanor, the pair grow closer during the journey and eventually fall in love. When they reach Frogtown, everyone involved is captured. The frogs' second-in-command, Bull, tortures Hell and attempts to remove the codpiece for its technology. Meanwhile, a slightly drugged Spangle is forced to work as a slave and dance for the frogs' Commander Toty. Proving more successful than she had wished, the nurse soon finds herself at the mercy of the aroused commander. However, with the codpiece now removed (Bull finally removed it with a chainsaw, but it exploded and killed him), the escaped Hell rescues her along with the group of fertile women held captive.

== Cast ==
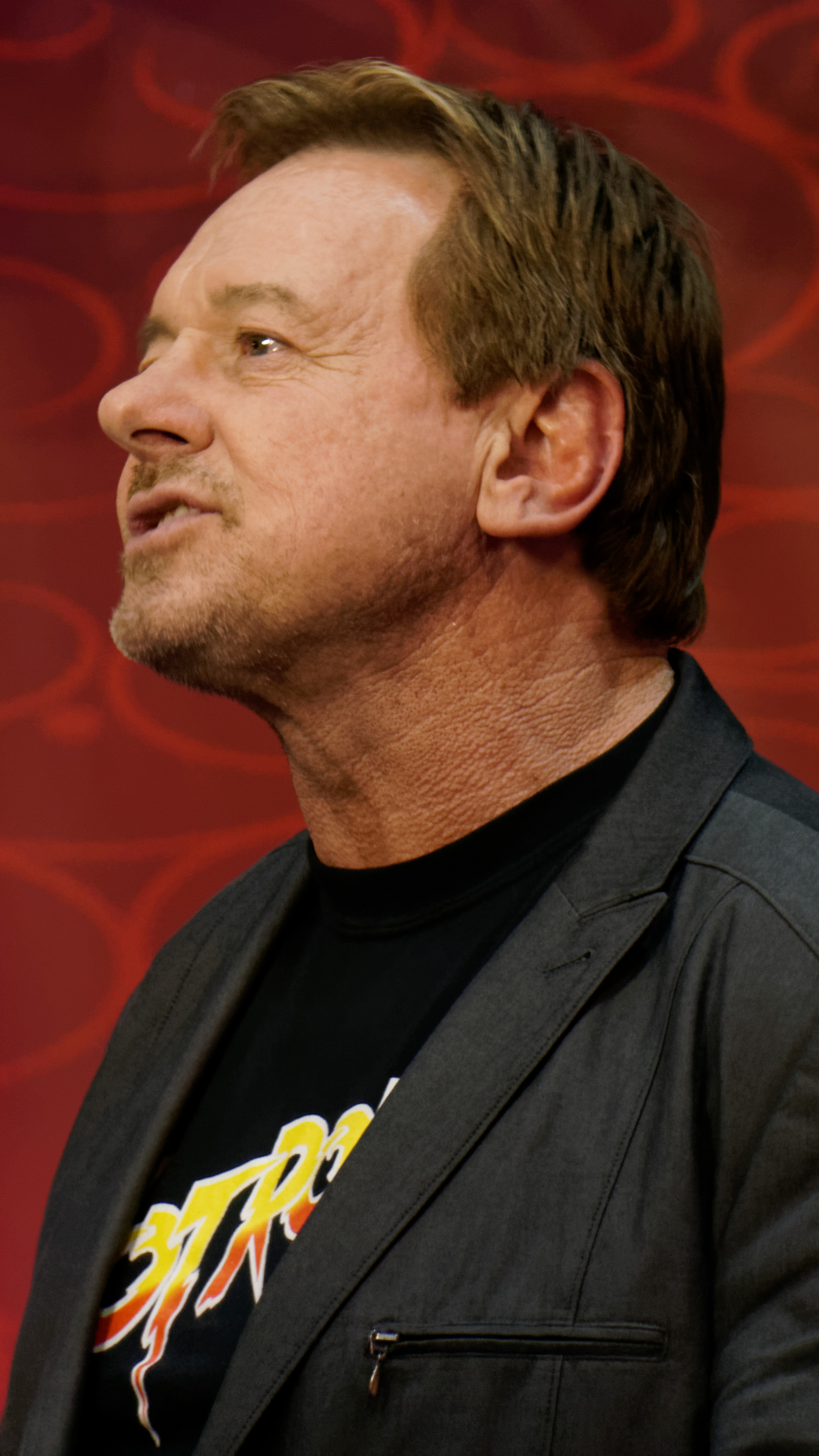
Roddy Piper

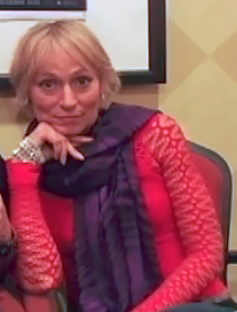
Sandahl Bergman on Count Gore De Vol

- Roddy Piper as Sam Hell
- Sandahl Bergman as Spangle
- Cec Verrell as Centinella
- William Smith as Captain Devlin/Count Sodom
- Rory Calhoun as Looney Tunes
- Cliff Bemis as Leroy
- Nicholas Worth as Bull
- Kristi Somers as Arabella
- Brian Frank as Commander Toty
- Julius LeFlore as Squidlips
- Eyde Byrde as Patton
- Lee Garlington as Briefing Officer

== Production ==
After director Donald G. Jackson's $70,000 Roller Blade direct-to-video film proved a success, New World Pictures approached Jackson asking him if he had any other viable concepts for another direct-to-video project. Jackson presented New World with a script he had written with Randall Frakes titled Hell Comes to Frogtown describing the concept as The Road Warrior meets Planet of the Apes and after responding positively to the pitch initially agreed to finance the film as a non-union $150,000 production. New World then decided they wanted a name attached to the project which led to original Spangle actress, Suzanne Solari, recast in a smaller role and given the option of Sybil Danning or Sandahl Bergman as potential choices with Jackson ultimately choosing Bergman. With the casting of Bergman this meant the film had to be cast with other SAG actors raising the budget to $500,000 and was moved from New World's direct-to-video division to their feature division. Once the project moved to the feature division, executives expressed skepticism that the film's action and stunt sequences could be achieved for $500,000 and increased the budget again to between $750,000 and $1 million.

Due to Jackson's experience with smaller scale projects and New World liking the project, they allowed Jackson to stay on as director only if he'd agree to co-direct with R. J. Kizer, an editor for New World who had directed the American sequences of Godzilla 1985, New World's re-edit of The Return of Godzilla. While Jackson wasn't happy to lose control of the project he ultimately accepted the condition as he felt it was a better career move. Once in production Jackson experienced conflicts not only with Kizer but also the art director, who had been hired because he was a friend of one of the New World executives, as Jackson would often need to change the set dressing to make it look better in camera as Jackson was also performing cinematographer duties which led to executives filling that position with someone who was more agreeable to the art director. Throughout the production producer Neal Nordlinger and R. J. Kizer deviated from and cut the script repeatedly and even fired Randall Frakes after he insisted the script be filmed as written. Despite New World's initial intentions of giving the film a theatrical release, upon reviewing the final cut it was decided to give the film a direct-to-video release.

The frog effects were designed by Steve Wang.

== Release ==
The film was released in Texas in January 1988. It was released on home video by New World Video on June 21, 1988.

== Reception ==
Critical reception for Hell Comes to Frogtown has been mixed to positive. TV Guide awarded the film two out of five stars, calling it "Another of those futuristic, post-apocalyptic science fiction dramas."

DVD Talk gave the film three out of five stars, writing, "Rowdy Roddy Piper has to save the world by diddling beautiful babes and squashing six-foot mutant toads with crummy attitudes. What's not to like?"

Jason Cook of The Spinning Image rated the film a score of six out of ten stars, writing, "Cheap and cheerful its narrative lulls and directorial shortcomings are glossed over by a winning central performance and a smattering of witty dialogue. It's no cinematic masterpiece, but were there any talking mutant frogs in Citizen Kane?"

Creature Feature gave the movie 2.5 stars, finding that while it is a Mad Max ripoff, it does so with a sense of style and has the ability to laugh at itself.

Though not received well by critics, producer Randall Frakes says he was glad the fans seemed to like it and "get all the jokes as intended."

== Legacy ==
Hell Comes to Frogtown inspired the title of the "Hell Comes to Quahog" (2006) episode of animated television series Family Guy.

=== Sequels and spinoffs ===
Hell Comes to Frogtown spawned one sequel, Return to Frogtown, which was released directly to VHS in 1993.

Toad Warrior was released in 1996 and later re-released as Max Hell Frog Warrior in 2002. According to Jackson, the film was intended as a stand-alone story.
