= Toys in the Attic (2009 film) =

- Original Czech theatrical release poster
- Directed by: Jiří Barta
- Written by: Jiří Barta
- Produced by: Miloslav Šmídmajer
- Starring: Jiří Lábus; Ivan Trojan; Vladimír Javorský; Petr Nárožný; Naďa Konvalinková; Miroslav Táborský
- Cinematography: Ivan Vít
- Edited by: Lucie Halabová
- Music by: Michal Pavlíček
- Production companies: At Armz; Česká Televize; Continental Film; Eurocine Films; Eurociné; Krátký Film Praha; Universal Production Partners (UPP); Bio Illusion
- Distributed by: CinemArt
- Release date: 5 March 2009 (Czech Republic)
- Running time: 75 minutes
- Countries: Czech Republic; Japan; France; Slovakia
- Language: Czech
- Box office: $64,918

Toys in the Attic (Czech: Na půdě aneb Kdo má dneska narozeniny?; festival title: In the Attic or Who Has a Birthday Today?) is a 2009 internationally co-produced stop-motion animated fantasy film written and directed by Jiří Barta, which depicts a community of toys and other objects in an attic who come to life when no human is around. It is an international co-production between the Czech Republic, France, Japan and Slovakia. The film was released first in the Czech Republic on 5 March 2009 and has been shown subtitled at film festivals internationally. An American English dub – adapted, produced and directed by Vivian Schilling and performed by actors including Forest Whitaker, Joan Cusack, Cary Elwes and Schilling herself – has been recorded, which the film was first shown with on 3 March 2012 at the New York International Children's Film Festival and was released nationally on 24 August 2012 by Hannover House.

== Cast ==
Character	Czech voice actor	English voice actor
Head	Branko Smiljanić	Douglas Urbanski
Buttercup	Jelena Martinović	Vivian Schilling
Sir Handsome	Marko Jelić	Cary Elwes
Teddy	Boris Barberić	Forest Whitaker
School Boy & Monkey	Darije Somi	Roy Vongtama
Laurent	Marko Juraga	Marcelo Tubert
Tomcat	Nikola Marjanović	Rico Simonini
Madam Curie	Mirjana Sinožić	Joan Cusack
Rosie	Jelena Martinović	Joy Ellison
Mrs. Nemačhkova	Mirjana Sinožić	Sandy Holt
Andreja	Nikica Viličić	Emily Ricks Hahn
Majmun	Nikola Marjanović	Roy Vongtama

== Production ==
Jiří Barta wrote and directed the film, which was originally titled Whose Birthday is it Today before it was renamed Toys in the Attic, from 1998 to 2000 with the intention of creating a story that was family-orientated, sellable to producers, and having elements of a child's imagination: "When I found an old exercise book with my drawing of a train made from old train tickets with a piece of cigarette for the smokestack, the kid in my imagination reappeared. Edgar and I remembered the games we used to play in strange forbidden places we found in our attics."

Due to very short deadlines set by the producer, multiple stages of making Toys in the Attic, including pre-production, production, and post-production, happened at the same time. The film was made by a total of ten to fifteen of Prague art school graduates and Barta's colleagues and friends. Pre-production began in January 2007; it involved not only storyboarding but also creating the puppets and sets from a "huge amount of junk and antique stuff." The filming and animation took place from June 2007 to September 2008, which the final product contains 1,200 stills; and post-production was finished by early 2009.

The main part of the film's animation is that of puppets animated by stop motion but there are also examples of clay animation in the character Šubrt and the objects of his room, special effects such as steam in traditional animation and the face of the plaster bust Hlava ("Head") was performed in pixilation and voiced in the original Czech audio by actor Jiří Lábus.

== Release ==
The film was theatrically released on 5 March 2009 by CinemArt and was premiered at the New York International Children's Film Festival. It was released on DVD and VOD on November 23, 2009, by Magic Box (in Czech with optional English subtitles). In early 2013, the English version (with English soundtrack, and with the Czech signs in the film replaced by English ones) was released on DVD and Blu-ray by Hannover House.

== Reception ==
CinemaArt released the film in the Czech Republic on 6 March 2009. Peter Debruge compared the film to Toy Story in a reviews for Variety, and complimented the animation: "despite their inflexible faces, Barta conceives all sorts of inventive ways to bring these inanimate objects to life. […] Should a given shot prove too tricky to accomplish practically, Barta has no qualms about using digital compositing to blend multiple stop-motion plates. Though rudimentary, fire and water effects are especially effective." About the film's commercial prospects, Debruge wrote: "For all its charms, In the Attic feels vaguely sinister and may prove too intense for younger kids – a testament to the film's pacing and score, as well as how deeply auds emotionally connect with these occasionally macabre toy characters."

The film has been honored with awards including an Excellence Prize for animation at the 2010 Japan Media Arts Festival, those for best feature at the 2010 New York International Children's Film Festival and the 2011 Tehran International Animation Festival, in both winning over The Secret of Kells, and the Kecskemét City Award at the 7th Festival of European Animated Feature Films and TV Specials in 2011. The film has a 70% on Rotten Tomatoes.

== Awards ==
List of awards and nominations
Award	Category	Winner	Nominee
Czech Lion	Best Art Direction (Nejlepsí výtvarný pocin)	Jirí Barta	Won
