= Werewolf (1996 film) =

- Directed by: Tony Zarrindast
- Written by: Tony Zarindast; Brad Hornbacher
- Produced by: Tony Zarrindast
- Starring: Jorge Rivero; Federico Cavalli; Adriana Stastny; Richard Lynch; Joe Estevez
- Cinematography: Robert Hayes; Dan Gilman
- Edited by: Peter Taylor
- Music by: Keith Bilderbeck
- Distributed by: A-Pix Entertainment
- Release date: July 21, 1996
- Running time: 99 minutes
- Country: United States
- Language: English

Werewolf (also known as Arizona Werewolf) is an American direct-to-video horror film directed by Tony Zarrindast and starring Jorge Rivero, Richard Lynch, Federico Cavalli, Adrianna Miles, and Joe Estevez.

The film received negative reception from critics. It is best known for being lampooned in a 1998 episode of Mystery Science Theater 3000.

== Plot ==
Archaeologists working in the Arizona desert find a skeleton that appears to be a werewolf. The ill-tempered foreman, Yuri, gets into a fight with his crew: Tommy, Joel, and Bill. In the course of the fight, Tommy is scratched by the werewolf skeleton. This greatly alarms his fellow workers, especially Joel, who incredulously utters the word "yetiglanchi". The head archaeologist, Noel, dismisses all Native Americans from the site, but in a private meeting later that day, explains that a major problem may be developing; American Indian mythology holds that a "yetiglanchi" is a dangerous individual who takes on predatory lupine characteristics and kills humans.

Tommy is taken to the hospital, where he begins to exhibit signs of lycanthropy. Yuri sneaks into the hospital and takes a sample of Tommy's infected blood. Shortly thereafter, Tommy fully transforms into a werewolf and escapes after killing several people. Joel and Bill are waiting by Tommy's house armed with silver bullets, and they kill the werewolf in turn.

The action then shifts to a house in suburban Flagstaff, where a writer named Paul Niles arrives to take up residence, having inherited the house from his mother. At a party, Paul is introduced to Natalie Burke, a member of the archeological team present at the time of the original discovery. He takes a romantic interest in her. Yuri is expelled from the party after sexually harassing Natalie, but improvises a plan to create a new werewolf out of an unsuspecting security guard. Yuri drugs the guard before injecting him with a sample of Tommy's blood and is successful in creating another werewolf. This werewolf attempts to drive his car; however, he soon meets his death by running into a stack of flammable oil barrels.

The following day, Paul visits the lab at Natalie's invitation; she has asked him to help publicize their findings and obtain funding for their continued research. However, he is violently attacked by Yuri, who strikes him with the werewolf skull. Paul almost immediately begins showing signs of lycanthropy, even as Natalie attempts to comfort him. An extended series of scenes shows Paul's temperament and physical appearance changing, even as Paul himself remains frightened by the sudden changes. Finally, at a pool hall where Natalie and Yuri are both present, Paul transforms fully into a werewolf, turns feral, and runs out into the streets on a rampage. He assaults several anonymous people and characters from earlier in the film, quickly running away into the woods.

Yuri and Noel speak on the phone about capturing Paul and exhibiting him, but this enrages Natalie, who wishes to save Paul from such a fate. A chase scene ensues in which Yuri attempts to follow Paul into the desert brush, but Paul locates Yuri and violently kills him. Natalie arrives on the scene late, sees Yuri's dead body, and then returns to Paul's apartment. In a twist ending, Paul takes Natalie by the hand romantically, and it is slowly revealed that both of them are now werewolves.

== Cast ==
- Jorge Rivero as Yuri
- Richard Lynch as Noel
- Federico Cavalli as Paul Niles
- Adriana Stastny as Natalie Burke (credited as Adrianna Miles)
- Joe Estevez as Joel
- R.C. Bates as Sam / The Keeper
- Randall Oliver as Billy
- Jules Desjarlais as Tommy
- Heidi Bjorn as Carrie
- Tony Zarrindast as Security Guard

== Production ==
Several scenes from Werewolf were shot on the campus of Glendale Community College in Glendale, California. The lab scenes took place in the old Physical Science building before it was refurbished in the early 2000s. The footbridge that crosses Verdugo Road, in front of the college, is seen in several nighttime shots.

== Release and reception ==
In addition to being released on VHS, the film was also released on DVD in North America in 1997, making it among the earliest titles to be released to the format.

Reception to the film was widely negative. The Times Colonist criticized the acting and editing, adding that it made Plan 9 from Outer Space look like Independence Day. Fort Worth Star-Telegram gave it one star, calling it "silly, uneven and badly acted". Jim Craddock, author of VideoHound's Golden Movie Retriever, also gave it one star.

Dave Nuttycombe of Washington City Paper wrote in 1997, "Moving the werewolf myth from eastern Europe to southwestern America and transposing it into Navaho lore is a good idea; hiring the Greater Flagstaff Remedial Theater Auxiliary to perform and buying the monster suit in the Halloween aisle at CVS are not."

== Mystery Science Theater 3000 ==
Werewolf was lampooned in episode #904 of comedy television series Mystery Science Theater 3000, which first aired on the Sci-Fi Channel on April 18, 1998. It is noteworthy for having been mocked on MST3K only two years after its release and was also the most recent film to be featured on the series until Future War was featured the following season. Mike and the 'bots joked about the film's incredibly poor sound editing and special effects, with the eponymous monster appearing to be "simply a wolf, other times a kind of man-bear, other times a sort of fruit bat puppet, and at still other times, just a guy with the mumps overdue for a shave" as well as the thick accents of its leading actors ("Paul! You is a war-wilf!") and the poorly delivered lines ("This is absolutely fascinating" is said without any emotion, for example). All profanity was censored, most notably Sam the Keeper's line, "I just found out that Count Dracula was a faggot!"

Cast member and episode director Kevin Murphy summed up the experience by saying, "Werewolf is a gift from God." Fellow writer Bill Corbett said, "[Werewolf] was set in the Southwest but had all of these inexplicably Eastern European people mangling the pronunciation of the word werewolf—there are about seven different ways they pronounced it. And the werewolf looks really different every time. It's like they had a new makeup artist recruited every day to do it. Sometimes it looked like a little bat; sometimes it just looked like a guy with some fur glued to his nose."

The episode is one of the series' greatest, according to critics. Paste writer Jim Vorel extols the episode as one of the series' greatest, ranking it #4 out of 191 MST3K episodes from the first twelve seasons. The episode capitalizes brilliantly, according to Vorel, on the movie's parade of horrible accents, the poor acting by Adriana Stastny (Natalie), and Yuri's everchanging hair. "Everything about Werewolf invites mockery so openly," Vorel writes. "You start wondering if it was covertly produced explicitly so it could be featured on this show." In an article at Vulture, writer Courtney Enlow lists Werewolf as one of the series' 25 essential episodes. A Den of Geek article lists the Werewolf episode as one of the thirteen best MST3K featuring a horror movie.

Shout! Factory released the episode on November 18, 2008, as part of the MST3K: 20th Anniversary Edition DVD set. The set also included three other episodes: First Spaceship On Venus (episode #211), Laserblast (episode (#706), and Future War (episode #1004).
