= Savage Land (film) =

- Directed by: Dean Hamilton
- Screenplay by: Dean Hamilton
- Story by: Eric Parkinson
- Produced by: Dean Hamilton
- Starring: Corbin Bernsen; Vivian Schilling; Brion James; Charlotte Ross; Corey Carrier; Mercedes McNab; Graham Greene; Charles Napier; Sonny Landham; Martin Kove; Page Fletcher
- Cinematography: Roland 'Ozzie' Smith
- Edited by: Scott Conrad
- Music by: Michael Conway Baker
- Production companies: Motion Picture Village; Savage Land Productions
- Distributed by: Hemdale Home Video
- Release date: September 13, 1994
- Running time: 98 minutes
- Countries: United States; Canada
- Language: English

Savage Land is a Canadian-American co-produced Western film, directed by Dean Hamilton and released in 1994. Set in the early 1900s, the film stars Corey Carrier and Mercedes McNab as Luke and Hanna Morgan, a brother and sister who are moving to Colorado to reunite with their father after spending some time living with their aunt and uncle in Kansas, only for their stagecoach to be held up by outlaws Quint (Corbin Bernsen) and Cyrus (Brion James).

The cast also includes Vivian Schilling, Charlotte Ross and Graham Greene.

The film was shot near Millarville, Alberta, in 1993.

The song "Far Away", written by Michael Conway Baker and Penny Anne Baker, received a Genie Award nomination for Best Original Song at the 15th Genie Awards.

== Reception ==
The picture was snubbed by critics and even cast members.

Marc Horton, of the Edmonton Journal, called it "one of the worst films ever made, sunk by bland direction and a monotonous script...Although aimed at kids, this is too shallow and heavy-handed to engage anyone."

When asked about this movie 2 years after its release, Charles Napier said his favorite moment was when he and the other performers finally got paid for their work after several delays. (The producers had experienced trouble processing the actors' salaries.) Sonny Landham, meanwhile, was questioned about the possibility of a sequel. His response: "I don't give a f***."
