= The Final Sanction (film) =

1990 film by David A. Prior

- Directed by: David A. Prior
- Written by: David A. Prior
- Produced by: David Marriott
- Starring: Ted Prior; Robert Z'Dar; Renée Cline; David Fawcett; William Smith
- Music by: Garm Beall; Tim James; Steve McClintock
- Distributed by: Action International Pictures
- Release date: 1990
- Running time: 90 minutes
- Country: United States
- Language: English

The Final Sanction is a 1990 American action film, directed by David A. Prior and starring Ted Prior, Robert Z'Dar and William Smith.

== Plot ==
The United States and Russia have had a nuclear exchange, wiping out most of humanity in the process. In order to decide a winner without any further bombing, the nations both decide to choose their best soldier and let them fight in a restricted area in Virginia. The result of the duel will decide the winner of the war.

Sergeant Tom Batanic (Ted Prior) and Sergei (Robert Z'Dar) fight mercilessly, but at the end they realize the futility of their duel and agree to end it, just as the U.S. general in charge decides to explode the building they are in. It turns out that the whole affair was just a secret agreement between the American and Russian general to let the world realize that in a war, no one is a winner. However, Tom and Sergei survive the explosion, the American general is arrested by the FBI.

== Cast ==
- Ted Prior as Sergeant Tom Batanic
- Robert Z'Dar as Sergeant Sergei Schvackov
- Renee Cline as Lieutenant Tavlin
- William Smith as Major Galashkin
- David Fawcett as General Royston
- Barry Silverman as The Senator
- Graham Timbes as Koshkin
- Tracy Benedict as Claire
- Stephen R. James as Lieutenant Willy Gross
- Chris Brown as Captain
- Lee Turner as Corporal
- Mary Bird as Sergei's Mother
- Nevin Rice as Sergei's Father

== Reception ==
Talking Pulp said that the film "should be ran[sic] through the Cinespiria Shitometer", while The Action Elite said it " is a cool concept with some entertaining action scenes but it does feel like a missed opportunity with a lame ending."
