= Alireza Zarrindast =

Iranian Cinematographer (born 1945)

- علیرضا زرین‌دست
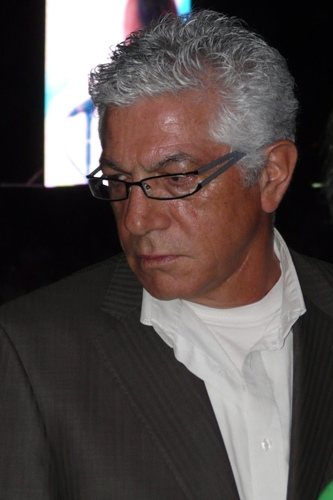
- Born: 1945 (age 79–80); Tabriz, Iran
- Occupation: Cinematographer

Alireza Zarrindast (Persian: علیرضا زرین‌دست; born 1945 in Tabriz, Iran) is an Iranian cinematographer. He is the brother of Tony Zarrindast.
