= USA Up All Night =

- Also known as: Up All Night; Up All Night with Rhonda Shear
- Genre: Variety; Sketch comedy
- Created by: Hilary Schacter
- Written by: Alex Bernstein; Trace Burroughs; Marty Byk; Tim Conway, Jr. Michael Eisenbaum; Bob Hilgenberg; Rob Muir; Angela Muto; Billy Romary; Tim Maile; Caroline Schlitt
- Directed by: Marty Byk; Lou Chagaris; Michael Eisenbaum; Kerry-Ellen Meehan; Brad Kriesberg
- Presented by: Gilbert Gottfried (1989–1998); Caroline Schlitt (1989–1990); Rhonda Shear (1991–1998)
- Composer: Edd Kalehoff
- Country of origin: United States
- Original language: English
- No. of seasons: 10
- No. of episodes: over 900

Production
- Producers: Kerry-Ellen Meehan; Marty Byk; Michael Eisenbaum; Antoinette Ribisi; Christy Davis
- Production locations: New York City (1989–1998); Los Angeles (1989–1995)
- Running time: 4–6 hours

Original release
- Network: USA Network
- Release: January 7, 1989 – March 7, 1998

USA Up All Night (also known as Up All Night and Up All Night with Rhonda Shear) is an American cable television series that aired weekly on Friday and Saturday nights on the USA Network. The show aired from 1989 to 1998. Throughout its run, the program was hosted by Gilbert Gottfried, Caroline Schlitt, and finally Rhonda Shear.

== Synopsis ==
The program consisted primarily of low-budget films, bookended by in-studio or on-location comedy skits featuring the show's hosts. In addition to skits, the hosts would also provide sardonic comments about the featured film(s), and observations on various Hollywood- and/or New York City-area clubs and attractions (when the series was shooting out of studio). Including commercials, the program typically ran from 11 p.m. to 5 a.m.

The films aired ranged from cult classics, to B movies, to other fare not appearing on television frequently. Up All Night would regularly show sexploitation films, with the explicit content edited out.

=== Hosts ===
The series began on January 7, 1989, with comic Gilbert Gottfried hosting on Saturdays from New York City. In that first show, Gottfried was seen in an empty office building in Manhattan. The first two films that night were Cheerleaders Beach Party and Stuck on You!. Halfway through the first season, a Friday night show broadcast from Los Angeles hosted by actress/comedian Caroline Schlitt (fresh off the short-lived Camp Midnite) was added. When Schlitt left the program in December 1990, comedian/B-movie actress Rhonda Shear replaced her on Fridays, beginning on January 4, 1991. In 1995, the Shear edition moved to New York City (home of the Gottfried edition), and stayed there for the remainder of the run.

=== Format ===
Originally, the show aired at 11 p.m. on Saturdays, and featured two movies (with in-studio or on-location comedy skits in between), which were then followed by a repeat of the first movie. When the Friday night edition was added in mid-1989, the format consisted of three different movies, with the third one being un-hosted (the bumpers for the third movie were simply narrated by the host, depending on the edition). Some episodes did not have a third movie. The Friday show originally began at midnight and ran until 6 a.m. In July 1991, it was changed to the same time as the Saturday edition. In December 1994, the format was changed slightly to incorporate Duckman into the 11:00 p.m. time slot, prior to the first movie. This trend of incorporating Duckman into the show continued on occasion until Duckman ended in September 1997.

In April 1996, the Saturday edition was moved to 12 a.m.. In July 1996 it moved back to 11 p.m., and August 1996 the Friday show move to 12 a.m. In January 1997, the Saturday show moved to 12 a.m., with the Friday show moving back to 11 p.m. a month later in February. For a short time in 1997, there was no third movie.

=== Specials ===
Occasionally, the show did special episodes which were often hosted by Shear and Gottfried together. They included Grad Night specials at Universal Studios Florida during 1992 and 1993, a mock B-Movie Awards special during 1993, and New Year's Eve specials during 1991, 1992, and 1993.

== Cancellation ==
In 1998, USA came under the new management of Barry Diller, and decided to go for a more general and upscale viewership. This meant many of USA's long-running series were either overhauled or canceled – Up All Night ended up among the latter. The network relieved Shear and Gottfried of their hosting duties (while still showing the Up All Night imagery before/after commercial breaks), and began airing re-runs of mainstream films that appealed to a broader audience. By 2002, the Up All Night name, music, and graphics were completely removed from the films.

From December 1988 to February 1998, a grand total of over 900 episodes of USA Up All Night were shot.

== International version ==
In 1993, for about a year, Rhonda Shear hosted a Spanish version of USA Up All Night for the Latin market.

== See also ==
- Night Flight (TV series)
