= Guns of El Chupacabra =

- DVD box cover
- Directed by: Donald G. Jackson
- Written by: Scott Shaw; Donald G. Jackson
- Produced by: Scott Shaw; Donald G. Jackson
- Starring: Scott Shaw; Julie Strain; Kevin Eastman; Robert Z'Dar; Joe Estevez; Conrad Brooks
- Cinematography: Donald G. Jackson
- Edited by: Scott Shaw
- Release date: April 20, 1997
- Running time: 90 min.
- Country: United States
- Language: English
- Budget: $3,200,000

Guns of El Chupacabra is a 1997 martial arts–based monster film that was directed by Donald G. Jackson and was produced by and stars Scott Shaw. The co-stars of this film include Julie Strain, Kevin Eastman, Conrad Brooks, Joe Estevez and Robert Z'Dar.

== Cast ==
- Scott Shaw as Space Sheriff Jack B. Quick
- Julie Strain as Queen B
- Kevin Eastman as King Allmedia
- Robert Z'Dar as Z-Man Lord Invader
- Conrad Brooks as Deputy Reins
- Joe Estevez as Rocket Ranger Dan Danger
- David Heavener as Stranger X
- Julie Lunar Strom as Linda Marshall (credited as Julie Lunar-Strom)
- Jeff Hutchinson as Sherman
- Joe Haggerty as Agent Rinaldi
- Andy Hubbell as Agent Orange
- Stacey Nikolova as Maria-Maria
- Dee as The Captive
- Scott Jones as Mountain Man
- Herve Estrada as The Santiago Kid (credited as Hervi Estrada)
- Sabrina Rippey as Sister Mercy
- Andi Schuster as Melinda Jamison

== Development and plot ==
The films follow the lead character Jack B. Quick, Space Sheriff, who is sent to Earth by Queen B, and King Allmedia to battle El Chupacabra. He enters the Earth driving a vintage Plymouth Belvedere. Once on Earth he acquires several fire arms and goes on a mission to rid the earth of El Chupacabra.

This has B-grade pinup Julie Strain as priestess Queen B. Her then-real-life husband, Teenage Mutant Ninja Turtles co-creator Kevin Eastman plays King Allmedia. From their space boudoir, comprising as it does candelabras, a chaise longue, and some curtains, they summon Scott Shaw's Space Sheriff Jack B. Quick, and tell him they'll reward him with an action-hero franchise if he defeats Robert Z'Dar's Z-Man Lord Invader, who has unleashed the mythical monster the Chupacabra on earth. So far, so low-rent, but comprehensible, at least by the standards of Jackson and Shaw. Jack heads to earth and all sense goes out the window.

The most interesting Shaw/Jackson collaboration is Guns of El Chupacabra (1997), a film that has been described as "Fellini meets the Coen Brothers". It's an acid-tinged spaghetti western about a space sheriff named James B. Quick who has come to earth to kill mythical creatures in the desert. The cast includes B-movie legends Joe Estevez (brother of Martin Sheen) and Robert Z'Dar (Samurai Cop), Penthouse Pet Julie Strain and her husband, Teenage Mutant Turtles co-creator Kevin Eastman, and Conrad Brooks, an actor who appeared in the films of legendary director Ed Wood (Plan 9 From Outer Space). All of these actors were quick to embrace the creativity that Zen filmmaking allows and have appeared in many Scott Shaw films over the years.

So why opt for El Chupacabra? It was pure serendipity according to Scott Shaw, the film's producer. "Don and I were down in Mexico to do a movie called the Guns of Baha, and we were scouting locations. We kept hearing about these chupacabras. We got to this weird road and noticed strange dead animals along the roadside. So it was five in the evening and there was three cars down the road. Suddenly, something apparently ran across the road causing the first car to flip over. We stopped. Don had a bad hip, so I grabbed the camera and started helping people out while trying to shoot things. The people swore it was a chupacabra that made the car flip. Don and I looked at each other so then we just decided to change the film title from Baha to Guns of El Chupacabra."

== Other media ==
The television series Strange Universe did an episode on this movie titled, "The Chupacabra".
