= Rhonda Shear =

American actress, television personality, comedian (born 1954)

- Born: November 12, 1954 (age 71); New Orleans, Louisiana, U.S.
- Education: Loyola University New Orleans
- Occupations: Television host; actress; model; entrepreneur; author
- Years active: 1970–present
- Television: USA Up All Night
- Spouse: Van Fagen (m. 2001)
- Beauty pageant titleholder
- Title: Miss Louisiana USA 1975,
- Major competition: Miss USA 1975
- Website: rhondashear.com

Rhonda Honey Shear (born November 12, 1954) is an American television personality, comedienne, actress, and entrepreneur. She is known for her role as a host in the 1990s USA Network's weekend B movie show, USA Up All Night. In 2001, she started an intimate apparel business that was marketed on Home Shopping Network (HSN), with one of her most successful products being the Ahh Bra in 2010. She is a regular participant in Tampa Bay's annual Fashion Week events.

== Early life ==
Shear was born in New Orleans, Louisiana. She attended Loyola University, earning a Bachelor of Arts degree in communications. After graduating from Loyola in 1977, she moved to Los Angeles, California, to pursue a career in Hollywood.

== Career ==
=== Modeling, hosting, and acting ===
Shear earned titles in several beauty contests, including holding the titles of Miss Louisiana USA 1975 for Miss USA and that of Miss Louisiana for both the Miss World and the Miss International pageants. She appeared as a contestant in The Gong Show in 1979. She also appeared as grown up Kimmy Gibbler in the 1987 sitcom, Full House.

Shear is best known for her role as a host of the USA Network's 1980s and '90s weekend B-movie show, USA Up All Night. From 1991 to 1998, she hosted in-studio and on-location segments that typically aired on Friday nights, replacing comedian Caroline Schlitt (the Friday night host for the show's first few years). She also occasionally hosted the show with her Saturday counterpart, Gilbert Gottfried, in addition to making cameos on his edition. Her trademark manner of speaking the show's title, by raising her voice an octave when saying the word "Up", became a catch phrase. Shear also briefly hosted a comedy program called Spotlight Cafe on WWOR-TV in Secaucus, New Jersey, hosted previously by comic Judy Tenuta.

Shear made two subsequent nude appearances in Playboy: First, in their "Funny Girls" pictorial in June 1991, then in her own pictorial titled "Rhonda Is Up All Night" in October 1993.

Shear also co-starred in numerous sitcoms from playing the Fonz's girlfriend on Happy Days to the sexy neighbor on Married... with Children, before making her mark as a comedian. She then made her way into stand-up comedy, headlining as a successful comedian in Las Vegas, Los Angeles, and New York, and eventually touring across the country with Comedy PJ Party, an on-stage slumber party featuring a number of comedians.

=== Entrepreneur career ===
In 2001, Shear, with her husband Van Fagan, started Shear Enterprises. She began designing from her home office in 2003 with three employees, and launched the Rhonda Shear Intimates line at Home Shopping Network. Her products were picked up on shopping networks around the world, including The Shopping Channel (Canada) and Ideal World Shopping (U.K.). Rhonda Shear Intimates has continued to grow and is now represented in over 40 countries with over 25 employees in her St. Petersburg, Florida offices.

In 2010, Shear designed the Ahh Bra, and the product was an overnight success. The Ahh Bra was the number-one selling bra worldwide with over 25 million sold internationally. In 2011, the company had $72 million in sales. As of 2013, she has added cosmetics, swim wear, fragrances, and Boomer Hottie.

In 2014, a line of "intimates, athleisure, and loungewear" was announced that was co-designed with Crystal Hefner, 2009 Playboy Playmate and wife of Hugh Hefner, to be sold through Hefner's website.

Shear has written a book titled Up All Night: From Hollywood Bombshell to Lingerie Mogul, Life Lessons from an Accidental Feminist, released in October 2017.

== Charity work ==
In 2011, Shear was the event chair and a sponsor for American Cancer Society's Making Strides: Put on Your Pink Bra Event. Between speaking engagements, creating a giant flying bra for the RedBull Flugtag, and helping with fundraising events, Shear got the chance to meet with women struggling in treatment or following surgery who needed bras that were affordable, feminine, and comfortable. She was struck by their stories, strength, and sense of community. Shear stays connected by donating product every month to women's shelters around the country and continuing her work nationwide with various charitable organizations that fund research and empower women.

== Personal life ==
Shear married her childhood sweetheart Van Fagen, who works as her business partner in Shear Enterprises. They live in St. Petersburg, Florida.

== Credits ==
=== Filmography ===
- Quadroon (1971)
- J.D.'s Revenge (1976)
- Galaxina (1980)
- Party Games for Adults Only (1984)
- Doin' Time (1985)
- Basic Training (1985)
- Spaceballs (1987)
- The Roller Blade Seven (1991)
- Legend of the Roller Blade Seven (1992)
- Return to Frogtown (1993)
- Tender Loving Care (1995)
- Assault of the Party Nerds 2: The Heavy Petting Detective (1995)
- Earth Minus Zero (1996)
- Don't Quit Your Day Job (1996 video game)
- The Fanatics (1997)
- Desperation Boulevard (1998)
- Prison-A-Go-Go! (2003)
- You Are All Going to Die (2013)

=== Discography ===
- Your Bedtime Buddy (1996)

=== Television ===
- The John Pela Show (dancer, 1970)
- New Orleans Saints Vs. Atlanta Falcons Match (dancer, 1970)
- Shape Spa Commercial (herself, 1977)
- The $1.98 Beauty Show (contestant, 1978)
- The Love Experts (contestant, 1978)
- The Gong Show (contestant, 1979)
- Happy Days (1 episode, 1979)
- The Misadventures of Sheriff Lobo (1980)
- The Bob Hope Special (1980)
- Dance Fever (1981)
- The Young and the Restless (1982)
- Two Top Bananas (1982)
- Dallas (3 episodes, 1982–1985)
- CHiPs (1 episode, 1982)
- Hart to Hart (1 episode, 1983)
- The Fall Guy (1 episode, 1983)
- The A-Team (1 episode, 1983)
- Three's Company (1 episode, 1983)
- Hour Magazine (1984)
- Eye on L.A. (1984)
- The Dukes of Hazzard (1 episode, 1984)
- The New Mike Hammer (2 episodes, 1984)
- Cheers (1 episode, 1985)
- The Tonight Show with Johnny Carson (1985)
- The New Love American Style (1986-1987)
- Hot Seat with Wally George (4 episodes, 1986–1987)
- Me and Mrs. C (1987)
- Morgus Presents (episode "Space Meeting" 1987)
- Hard Knocks (1989)
- The Alan Thicke Show (1990)
- Full House (1 episode, 1990)
- Married... with Children (episode "Do Ya Think I'm Sexy" 1990)
- USA Up All Night (Host, 1991–1998)
- Circus of the Stars (1991)
- Doctor Doctor (1 episode, 1991)
- Into The Night (1992)
- A & E's Comedy on the Road (1992)
- Larry King Live (guest, 1993)
- Maury Povich Show (guest, 1993–1994)
- Entertainment Tonight (1993 and 1995)
- Joan Rivers Show (1994)
- Sally Jessy Raphael (1994)
- VH1 Top 21 Countdown (1994)
- Rick Dees Show (1994)
- Christina Show (1994)
- Bertice Barry Show (1994)
- Silk Stalkings (1 episode, 1994)
- WWF WrestleMania X (guest timekeeper, 1994)
- Battle of the Sexes (1995)
- Evening at the Improv (1995-1996)
- The Richard Bey Show (1995)
- Geraldo (1995-1998)
- Clint Homes Show (1995)
- Mike and Maty Show (1995)
- Good Morning Television (1995)
- Women Aloud (1995)
- The Howard Stern Show (guest, 1995)
- Politically Incorrect with Bill Maher (guest, 1995)
- Duckman (1 episode, 1996)
- Live form Queens (1996)
- Runaway with The Rich and Famous (1996)
- Judge Judy (1996)
- Pictionary (guest, 1997)
- Oddville, MTV (1 episode, 1997)
- Hard Copy (1998)
- Unhappily Ever After (1 episode, 1998)
- Access Hollywood (1998)
- Bloomberg Report (1998)
- The X Show (2000-2001)
- Love Bytes (1 episode, 2001)
- Home Shopping Network (correspondent, 2003–Present)
- The Peter Austin Noto Show (9 episodes, 2013)
- Meat the Carvers Halloween Special (2025)
- Up All Night (Host, 2025-)

== Bibliography ==
- Up All Night: From Hollywood Bombshell to Lingerie Mogul, Life Lessons from an Accidental Feminist (Mascot Books, 2017) ISBN 978-1684015016
