= The Roller Blade Seven =

1991 film by Donald G. Jackson

- Promotional advertisement
- Directed by: Donald G. Jackson
- Written by: Donald G. Jackson; Scott Shaw
- Produced by: Donald G. Jackson; Scott Shaw
- Starring: Scott Shaw; Frank Stallone; Karen Black; Joe Estevez; William Smith; Rhonda Shear; Don Stroud
- Cinematography: Donald G. Jackson
- Edited by: Scott Shaw
- Music by: Scott Shaw
- Release date: 1991
- Running time: 90 minutes
- Country: United States
- Language: English
- Budget: $300,000 USD

The Roller Blade Seven is a 1991 cult martial arts film directed by Donald G. Jackson, written by Jackson and Scott Shaw, produced by Jackson and Shaw, and starring Shaw, Frank Stallone, Karen Black, Joe Estevez, Don Stroud, and William Smith.

== Plot and style ==
The Roller Blade Seven unfolds in an abstract, dreamlike structure, utilizing minimal dialogue and repetition of footage in key scenes. Several sequences occur repeatedly, such as a scene in which the protagonist is seen to get on his motorcycle and ride out of a car-park eight times in a row, leaving from a different parking bay each time.

The film follows Hawk Goodman (Scott Shaw) who is sent on a mission by Father Donaldo (Donald G. Jackson) to rescue his sister, Sister Sparrow Goodman, from the clutches of the evil overlord Pharaoh (William Smith) in the apocalyptic world of the future. The film takes place in a region known as the Wheelzone whose populace travels solely by the means of roller skates or skateboards. Hawk, however, arrives riding a Harley Davidson motorcycle.

Sister Sparrow has been abducted from the Master of Light Institute by the evil Saint Offender (Joe Estevez). Before Hawk can complete his task, he must take psychedelic mushrooms with cult movie actress Karen Black and learn to rollerblade. Armed only with his samurai sword, Hawk does battle with the Black Knight (Frank Stallone), rollerblading ninjas and other gangs that inhabit the Wheelzone. Joining him on this mission are a Kabuki mime (Claudia Scholz) with a wiffle bat, a rollerblading banjo player entirely swathed in bandages and a pacifist named Stella Speed.

Pharaoh's minions have been abducting women to make them his slaves. He explains that he uses a wheelchair due to an old skateboarding accident, and he longs for the days when he used to be able to ride a skateboard.

"Hawk's quest sees him chewing magic mushrooms with Karen Black, confronts murderous William Smith, wheel-chair bound Pharaoh and team up with blonde sake-enforcer Stella Speed. There's a lot of fights with skate freaks in metal demon/ninja horns/bondage gear and/or kabuki makeup".

== Cast ==
- Scott Shaw as Hawk Goodman
- Joe Estevez as Saint O'ffender
- Allison Chase as Stella Speed
- Don Stroud as Conga Man
- Karen Black as Tarot
- Frank Stallone as Black Knight
- Rhonda Shear as Officer Daryl Skates
- William Smith as Pharaoh
- Jill Kelly as Deserette
- Claudia Scholz as Kabuki

== Zen filmmaking ==
Shaw and Jackson described the Roller Blade Seven as the first example of Zen filmmaking. This is a style of filmmaking in which no scripts are used.

"Although it is directed by Donald G. Jackson of Hell Comes to Frogtown and other titles like Lingerie Kickboxer, Rollergator, and Ghost Taxi actor, writer and experimental martial artist Scott Shaw is more often recognized as the creative force behind the movie. He calls his unique approach to cinema Zen Filmmaking, which is a system that favors shooting whatever you feel like".

== Reception ==
Jim Vorel of Paste ranked the film #27 on his list of the 100 best B movies of all time, and wrote: "The Roller Blade Seven pretty easily manages to be the most psychedelic, mind-bending film on this entire list—my attempts to describe here only hint at its profound weirdness. It's a movie that is indescribable until you experience it".

== Sequels ==
The Roller Blade Seven was followed by Return of the Roller Blade Seven. There was then a version of the film created by combining footage from The Roller Blade Seven and Return of the Roller Blade Seven that was titled, Legend of the Roller Blade Seven. This version of the film was shown on USA Up All Night.
