= Joe Estevez =

American actor (born 1946)

Joe Estévez
- Born: Joseph Estévez; February 13, 1946 (age 80); Dayton, Ohio, U.S.
- Other names: Joe Phelan; Joseph Sheen
- Occupation: Actor
- Years active: 1973–present
- Spouses: Shirley Monkman (m. 1978; div. 2001); Constance Anderson (m. 2004)
- Children: 3
- Relatives: Martin Sheen (brother); Emilio Estévez (nephew); Ramon Estévez (nephew); Charlie Sheen (nephew); Renée Estévez (niece); Janet Sheen (sister-in-law)
- Family: Estévez

Joseph Estévez (born February 13, 1946), sometimes credited as Joe Phelan, is an American actor. A member of the Estevez family of actors, he is the younger brother of actor Martin Sheen and the uncle of Emilio Estévez, Charlie Sheen, Renée Estévez, and Ramón Estévez.

== Early life and education ==
Estevez was born in Dayton, Ohio in 1946, to a Spanish father from Galicia, Francisco Estévez Martínez (1898–1974), and an Irish mother, Mary Anne (née Phelan; 1903–1951). He is one of ten children—nine boys and one girl.

As a child, he lived in the South Park neighborhood of Dayton. He attended Chaminade-Julienne High School, a Catholic High School located in Dayton. Upon his graduation, he enlisted and served in the United States Navy.

== Career ==
After serving in the Navy, Estevez began pursuing an acting career starting in the early 1970s. He initially used his mother's maiden name, Phelan, before using his surname, Estevez. Throughout his career, Estevez has appeared in numerous film and television roles in lead, supporting, and minor parts playing protagonists and antagonists, and he frequently appears in moderate and low-budget independent features and B-movies. In addition, he has worked as a voice-over artist and performs in stage productions. He has expressed in an interview that he wants to make movies that make a difference.

Estevez stood in for his brother in a number of long shots and in some of the voice-overs for Apocalypse Now (1979), as Martin Sheen was recovering from his heart attack.

In 1992, he acted in Armed for Action and Blood on the Badge.

He plays a villain, Cyrus, in the film Doonby (2012), which features former The Dukes of Hazzard star John Schneider as a mysterious stranger who comes into a small town and falls in love with the spoiled daughter of Estevez's character, the local doctor. He also co-stars with David Faustino in the feature Not Another B Movie (2011) released by Troma Entertainment.

=== On Cinema ===
Since 2013, Estevez has worked with alternative comedians Tim Heidecker and Gregg Turkington on various projects including On Cinema, The Tim Heidecker Murder Trial and as President Jason Davidson (and President Davidson Jr.) on the Adult Swim series Decker. In all his collaborations, Estevez either plays a fictionalized version of himself or a character being portrayed by a fictionalized version of Joe Estevez.

== Personal life ==
Estevez is the youngest sibling of Martin Sheen and sounds very similar to him, a fact he took advantage of when he performed a voice-over for a National Shooting Sports Foundation pro-gunmaker commercial in 2000; at the time, his brother was famous for playing a President of the United States on the television series The West Wing. Sheen starred in a pro-gun control commercial that same year.

== Filmography ==
=== Film ===
Year	Title	Role	Notes
1975	Lucky Lady	American Kid	Film debut
1979	Apocalypse Now	Cpt. Benjamin L. Willard	Uncredited voice-over narration and stand-in only
1986	The Zero Boys	Killer	Credited as 'Joe Phelan'
1987	Terminal Exposure	Eskenezy	Credited as 'Joe Phelan'
1988	Human Error	Phil Martins	
1988	South of Reno	Hector	Credited as Joe Phelan
1989	The Platinum Triangle	Roland Geiger	
1990	Soultaker	The Man/Soultaker	
1991	The Roller Blade Seven	Saint O'ffender	
1992	Eddie Presley	Eddie's father	
1992	Return of the Roller Blade Seven	Saint O'ffender	
1992	The Legend of the Roller Blade Seven	Saint O'ffender	
1992	Blood on the Badge	Captain Burton	
1992	Armed for Action	Detective West	
1993	Dark Universe	Rod Kendrick	
1993	Beach Babes from Beyond	Uncle Bud	
1993	Fatal Justice	Ian "Mars" Connor	
1994	Double Blast	Nadir	
1994	Inner Sanctum II	Detective Lane	
1995	Little Lost Sea Serpent	Harry Rockwell	
1995	Baby Ghost	Winslow Cobblepott	
1995	Dillinger and Capone	Roy	
1995	Guns and Lipsticks	Sanders	
1996	Toad Warrior	Mickey O'Malley	Alternative title: Hell Comes to Frogtown III
1996	Rollergator	Chico Dennis	
1996	Werewolf	Joel	Alternative title: Arizona Werewolf
1997	Quiet Days in Hollywood	The Pick-Up Guy	Alternative title: The Way We Are
1997	Guns of El Chupacabra	Rocket Ranger Dan Danger	
1998	I Got the Hook Up	Lamar Hunt	
1998	No Code of Conduct	Pappy	
1998	Memorial Day	Willard's Contact	Uncredited
1999	14 Ways to Wear Lipstick	Maximo	
2000	The Catcher	Father/Umpire	
2001	Shattered Faith	Steve Townsend	
2002	Deathbed	Art	
2003	Spanish Fly	Harry Homeless	Segment: "Autopsy: A Love Story"
2003	Hitman City	Lt. O'Leary	
2003	Summer Solstice	Seth Arden	
2003	Minds of Terror	Farm Owner	
2003	Zombiegeddon	Brooks	
2004	Vampire Blvd.	Mr. Big Shot	
2004	I.R.A.: King of Nothing	Seamus	
2005	Resurrection Mary	Wilkes	
2005	Hercules in Hollywood	Zeus	
2006	Inner Rage	Sheriff McCarthy	
2006	San Franpsycho	Detective Bill Culp	
2007	Sigma Die!	Officer Brubek	
2007	Alibi	Detective Lombardi	Also associate producer
2007	Flatland	Abbott Square (voice)	Short film
2008	Withered One	Marin Gray	
2009	Untitled Horror Comedy	Chips Fisher	
2009	Dead in Love	Poker	
2009	La Femme Vampir	Joe	
2009	Caesar and Otto's Summer Camp Massacre	Himself	
2010	Horrorween	Neighbor	Also director
2010	Iron Soldier	General Brooks	
2010	La Femme Vampir Volume 2	Joe	
2011	Not Another B Movie	Sterns	
2012	Caesar and Otto's Deadly Christmas	Himself	
2012	The Perfect Candidate	Himself	
2012	Turning Point	The Boss	
2012	Doonby	Cyrus	
2013	Axe Giant: The Wrath of Paul Bunyan	Meeks	
2015	Samurai Cop 2: Deadly Vengeance	Captain Harmon	
2016	Enter the Samurai	Himself	Documentary
2019	Gangsters Incorporated	The Vice President	
2019	Mister America	Himself	Archive footage

=== Television ===
Year	Title	Role	Notes
1974	The Story of Pretty Boy Floyd	E.W. Floyd	Television movie Credited as 'Joseph Estevez'
1974	The California Kid	Don McCord	Television movie
1975	The Hatfields and the McCoys	Troy Hatfield	Television movie
1979	Eischied	Roth	1 episode Credited as 'Joseph Sheen'
1981	The Brady Brides	Fireman	1 episode Credited as 'Joseph Sheen'
1981	CHiPs	Mel	1 episode Credited as 'Joseph Sheen'
1982	The First Time	Sailor	Television movie Credited as 'Joseph Phelan'
1982	Bring' Em Back Alive	Kassle	1 episode Credited as 'Joseph Phelan'
1983	The Invisible Woman	Police Officer #2	Television movie Credited as 'Joseph Phelan'
1984	I Married a Centerfold	Reporter #2	Television movie Credited as 'Joseph Phelan'
1984	Whiz Kids	D.A Meeks	1 episode Credited as 'Joseph Phelan'
1985	The Fourth Wise Man	Townsperson	Television movie Credited as 'Joseph Phelan'
1986	Starman	West	1 episode
1987	CBS Schoolbreak Special	Coach	1 episode Credited as 'Joseph Phelan'
1990	Murder in Law	Bill	Television movie
1992	Psychic Detectives	Professor Halifax	Television movie
1996	Lethal Orbit	NSC Chairman	Television movie
1996	Backroads to Vegas	Ambrose's Father	Television movie
1998	Winner Takes All	Richard	Television movie
2000	Stolen from the Heart	Phil	Television movie
2000	Movie Stars	Joe Estevez	1 episode
2001	Black Scorpion	Butcherville	1 episode
2002	Jumping For Joy	Coach Layden	Television movie
2013	Brodowski & Company	Mr. Brodowski	Television movie
2013	Eagleheart	Himself	1 episode
2017	Wrecked	Jerry	1 episode

=== Web media ===
Year	Title	Role	Notes
2013–present	On Cinema	Himself	
2014–2022	Decker	President Jason Davidson/President Jason Davidson Jr./King of the Hearts	48 episodes, 1 short film
2016	Day 5	Alonzo Alvarez	3 episodes

=== Video games ===
Year	Title	Role	Notes
1998	Tex Murphy: Overseer	John Klaus	
