= Donald G. Jackson =

American film director

Donald Jackson
- Born: April 24, 1943; Tremont, Mississippi, U.S.
- Died: October 20, 2003 (aged 60); Los Angeles, California, U.S.
- Occupations: Film director, screenwriter, film producer, actor
- Spouse: Janet

Donald G. Jackson (April 24, 1943 – October 20, 2003) was an American filmmaker.

== Biography ==
Born in Tremont, Mississippi, Jackson grew up in Adrian, Michigan. As an adult he struggled to become a filmmaker for many years while working at an auto factory. In the mid-1970s, he made his first feature film, a horror film parody, The Demon Lover. This film was soon followed by the wrestling film, I Like to Hurt People. These films financed his move to Hollywood, California, where he remained until his death. Jackson is perhaps most well known for creating and directing the cult film, Hell Comes to Frogtown.

Throughout his career Jackson worked with several filmmakers including Roger Corman and James Cameron but it was not until he began a long collaboration with American filmmaker Scott Shaw that the team created a method they called zen filmmaking. Zen filmmaking is a distinct style of filmmaking where no scripts are used in the creation of a film. Actors who frequently starred in Jackson's films included Joe Estevez and Robert Z'Dar.

== Death ==
Jackson died of leukemia on October 20, 2003. He is buried in Pierce Brothers Westwood Village Memorial Park and Mortuary in Los Angeles.

== Filmography ==
- The Demon Lover (1976)
- I Like to Hurt People (1985)
- Roller Blade (1986)
- UFO: Secret Video (1986)
- Hell Comes to Frogtown (1987)
- Roller Blade Warriors: Taken by Force (1990)
- The Roller Blade Seven (1991)
- The Legend of the Rollerblade Seven (1992)
- Carjack (1993)
- Return to Frogtown (1993)
- It's Showtime (1993)
- Return of the Roller Blade Seven (1993)
- Pocket Ninjas (1994)
- Queen of Lost Island (1994)
- The Devil's Pet (1994)
- Twisted Fate (1994)
- Kill, Kill Overkill (1994)
- Baby Ghost (1995)
- Little Lost Sea Serpent (1995)
- Big Sister 2000 (1995)
- Raw Energy (1995)
- Rollergator (1996)
- Toad Warrior (1996)
- Guns of El Chupacabra (1997)
- Armageddon Boulevard (1998)
- Lingerie Kickboxer (1998)
- Guns of El Chupacabra 2: The Unseen (1999)
- Blade Sisters (1999)
- Ride with the Devil (1999)
- Legend of the Dead Boyz (2001)

=== Documentary films about Donald G. Jackson ===
- Demon Lover Diary (1980)
- Interview: The Documentary (2005)
