= Future War =

- VHS cover
- Directed by: Anthony Doublin
- Screenplay by: Dom Magwili
- Story by: David Huey; Dom Magwili
- Produced by: Dave Eddy; Tim Ubels
- Starring: Daniel Bernhardt; Travis Brooks Stewart; Robert Z'Dar; Mel Novak
- Narrated by: Travis Brooks Stewart
- Cinematography: Cory Geryak; Ed Tillman
- Edited by: Dave Eddy
- Music by: Arlan H. Boll
- Distributed by: Screen Pix Home Video
- Release date: January 28, 1997
- Running time: 90 minutes
- Country: United States
- Language: English

Future War is a 1997 American direct-to-video science fiction film about an escaped human slave fleeing his cyborg masters and seeking refuge on Earth. It was lampooned in a 1999 episode of Mystery Science Theater 3000.

== Plot ==
A spaceship is undergoing a revolt. A man enters and activates an escape pod, which travels to Earth and crashes into the Pacific Ocean. The pod contains "the Runaway", a human slave played by Daniel Bernhardt. He is being pursued by cyborg slavers and dinosaurs that they use as "trackers". Since he was kidnapped some time from Earth's past, the Runaway is familiar with the English language and the King James Bible, and he regards Earth as a literal heaven.

The Runaway finds refuge in Los Angeles with novice nun Sister Ann (Travis Brooks Stewart), whose past involved dealing drugs and prostitution. Together, they fight the dinosaurs and their robotic masters, seeking help from a street gang. Future War features star Daniel Bernhardt's kickboxing skills in several fight sequences, including against the Cyborg Master (Robert Z'Dar).

After being arrested as a suspect in a rash of deaths due to strange animal attacks, the Runaway is interrogated by federal agents. They present to him a dinosaur collar found on the beach. The Cyborg Master breaks into the police station during the interrogation and the Runaway manages to escape in the confusion. He returns to Sister Ann and her gang friends with a plan to attack the dinosaurs where they live, as Runaway simply explains, "Near water...".

Using dynamite, the Runaway successfully destroys a water treatment plant, killing the dinosaurs. Later, though, the surviving Cyborg Master attacks the Runaway while he watches Sister Ann make her final vows to become a nun. After the Runaway finally kills the Cyborg Master, he becomes a counselor for runaway teens, working closely with Sister Ann.

== Cast ==
- Daniel Bernhardt as the Runaway
- Travis Brooks Stewart as Sister Ann
- Robert Z’Dar as Cyborg Master
- Mel Novak as SWAT Leader
- Forrest J Ackerman as Park Victim
- Solly Assa as Cyborg Dominic

== Release history ==
Future War was released directly to home video on January 28, 1997, by Screen Pix Home Video.

It was later released on DVD in 2002 by EVG Digital Entertainment. This release contained no bonus materials. Despite the film itself being unrated, the Film Advisory Board rated this DVD EM or "Extremely Mature" (the equivalent of an R rating from the MPAA).

It was released on DVD again on May 4, 2004, by Trinity Home Entertainment, also with no bonus materials.

The film was also released on DVD as part of the Mystery Science Theater 3000: 20th Anniversary Edition DVD set released by Shout! Factory on October 8, 2008.

== Legacy ==
Future War was riffed in episode #1004 of comedy television series Mystery Science Theater 3000, which first aired on the Sci-Fi Channel on April 25, 1999. Writer/performer Mary Jo Pehl refers to star Daniel Berkhardt as "a B-squad Jean-Claude Van Damme" and mocks the blandness of the character of Sister Anne. She also calls the scene in which a cameraman uses a fake video camera made out of cardboard "heartbreaking".

Paste writer Jim Vorel places the episode in the series' top 10, ranking it number nine out of 191 MST3K episodes from the 12 twelve seasons. "The laughs never slow down for a moment," Vorel writes, with Mike and the 'bots mocking "the absurdity of the premise" and "the hilariously slapdash production values."

Shout! Factory released the episode on November 18, 2008, as part of the MST3K: 20th Anniversary Edition DVD set. The set also included three other episodes: First Spaceship On Venus (episode 211), Laserblast (episode 706), and Werewolf (episode 904).

== See also ==
- List of films featuring dinosaurs
