= Scott Shaw (author) =

American author (born 1958)

Scott Shaw (born September 23, 1958) is an American author, martial artist, musician, and filmmaker.

== Career ==
Scott Shaw is an advanced martial artist.

He has written a number of articles and books on the martial arts and on Zen Buddhism and eastern philosophy.

Shaw is an active actor and filmmaker. In collaboration with American filmmaker Donald G. Jackson he created a style of filmmaking where no screenplay and scripts are used in the creation of a movie. He titled this style of filmmaking, "Zen Filmmaking."

== Works ==
=== Partial bibliography ===
- About Peace (ISBN 1-59003-003-6)
- Advanced Taekwondo (ISBN 0-8048-3640-X)
- Alles op Zen tijd (ISBN 978-90-6271-924-2)
- Arc Left from Istanbul: A Photographic Exploration (ISBN 978-1-877792-57-1)
- Bangkok and the Nights of Drunken Stupor (ISBN 1-877792-06-3)
- Bangkok: Beyond the Buddha (ISBN 978-1-877792-64-9)
- Bus Rides (ISBN 1-877792-23-3)
- Cairo Before the Aftermath: A Photographic Exploration (ISBN 978-1-877792-74-8)
- Cambodian Refugees in Long Beach, California: The Definitive Study (ISBN 1-877792-02-0)
- Čchi-kung pro začátečníky (ISBN 80-7306-176-7)
- Chi Kung for Beginners: Master the Flow of Chi for Good Health, Stress Reductions & Increased Energy (ISBN 0-7387-0419-9)
- E.Q. (ISBN 1-877792-07-1)
- El Ki o la energia dinamica (ISBN 978-970-643-330-5)
- El pequeño libro de la respiración: El Pranayama, de manera fácil (ISBN 978-84-96111-12-7)
- Gods in Polyester: A Survivors' Account Of 70's Cinema Obscura (Contributor)
- Hapkido Articles on Self-Defense (ISBN 978-1-877792-65-6)
- Hapkido Articles on Self-Defense: Volume Two (ISBN 978-1-877792-72-4)
- Hapkido: Essays on Self-Defense (ISBN 1-877792-42-X)
- Hapkido: Korean Art of Self-Defense (ISBN 0-8048-2074-0)
- Hong Kong Out of Focus (ISBN 978-1-877792-58-8)
- Il Feluire Del Ki (ISBN 978-88-8093-172-0)
- In the Foreboding Shadows of Holiness (ISBN 1-877792-17-9
- Independent Filmmaking: Secrets of the Craft (ISBN 1-877792-49-7)
- Israel in the Oblique (ISBN 978-1-877792-61-8)
- Junk: The Back Streets of Bangkok (ISBN 1-877792-05-5)
- Ki: Technici Eneggentice Coreene (ISBN 973-20-0206-9)
- L. A. Tales from the Suburban Side of Hell (ISBN 1-877792-18-7)
- La Vita Secondo Lo Zen (ISBN 978-88-344-2920-4)
- Last Will & Testament According to the Divine Rites of the Drug Cocaine (ISBN 1-877792-00-4)
- Lo zen e la vita (ISBN 978-88-344-1201-5)
- Los Angeles Koreatown: An Urban Geographical View of the Factors That Lead to Its Inception & Its Current Urbanization (ISBN 1-877792-09-8)
- Love Lived Too Long (ISBN 1-877792-21-7)
- Marguerite Duras And Charles Bukowski: The Yin And Yang Of Modern Erotic Literature (ISBN 1-877792-45-4)
- Mastering Health: The A to Z of Chi Kung (ISBN 81-7822-272-8)
- Nirvána dióhéjban - 157 zen-meditáció (ISBN 978-963-9219-59-5)
- Nirvana in a Nutshell: 157 Zen Meditations (ISBN 1-59003-017-6)
- No Kisses for the Sinner (ISBN 1-877792-12-8)
- On the Hard Edge of Hollywood (ISBN 1-877792-38-1)
- One Word Meditations (ISBN 978-1-877792-82-3)
- Pagan, Burma: Shadows of the Stupa (ISBN 1-877792-63-2)
- Pránajáma dióhéjban (ISBN 978-963-9219-79-3)
- Pranayama: A Respiracao Para Revitalizacao Energetica (ISBN 978-85-7701-167-4)
- Rangoon and Mandalay: A Photographic Exploration (ISBN 978-1-877792-89-2)
- Sake in a Glass, Sushi with Your Fingers: Fifteen Minutes in Tokyo (ISBN 1-877792-22-5)
- Samurai Zen (ISBN 1-57863-104-1)
- Sanskrit, the Language: Inception and Modern Day Ramifications (ISBN 1-877792-10-1)
- Scream of the Buddha (ISBN 1-877792-55-1)
- Scream: Southeast Asia & the Dream (ISBN 1-877792-01-2)
- Scribbles on the Restroom Wall (ISBN 1-877792-53-5)
- Sedona Realm of the Vortex (ISBN 978-1-877792-66-3)
- Shama Baba (ISBN 1-877792-15-2)
- Shanghai Whispers Shanghai Screams (ISBN 1-877792-26-8)
- Shattered Thoughts (ISBN 1-877792-44-6)
- Siam Tracy (ISBN 1-877792-25-X)
- Simple Bliss: Nirvana Made Easy (ISBN 1-86204-850-9)
- Singapore Off Center (ISBN 978-1-877792-60-1)
- Skid Row 1983: A Photographic Exploration (ISBN 978-1-877792-62-5)
- South Korea in a Blur (ISBN 978-1-877792-59-5)
- Suicide Slowly (ISBN 1-877792-14-4)
- Szamurai Zen (ISBN 978-1-57863-104-9)
- Taekwondo - Căn bản
- Taekwondo Basics (ISBN 0-8048-3484-9)
- The Abstract Arsenal of Zen and the Psychology of Being: Further Zen Ramblings from the Internet (ISBN 978-1-877792-91-5)
- The Chronicles: Zen Ramblings from the Internet (ISBN 978-1-877792-73-1)
- The History of the Hmong
- The Ki Process: Korean Secrets for Cultivating Dynamic Energy (ISBN 0-87728-879-8)
- The Little Book of Yoga Breathing: Pranayama Made Easy (ISBN 1-57863-301-X)
- The Little Book of Yoga Meditation (ISBN 978-1-877792-67-0)
- The Most Beautiful Woman in Shanghai (ISBN 1-877792-24-1)
- The Passionate Kiss of Illusion (ISBN 1-877792-04-7)
- The Roller Blade Seven: A Photographic Exploration (ISBN 978-1-877792-87-8)
- The Screenplays (ISBN 1-877792-48-9)
- The Tao of Self-Defense (ISBN 1-57863-190-4)
- The Voodoo Buddha (ISBN 1-877792-56-X)
- The Warrior Is Silent: Martial Art and the Spiritual Path (ISBN 0-89281-668-6)
- The Zen of Everything (ISBN 1-877792-40-3)
- The Zen of Life, Lies, and Aberrant Reality (ISBN 978-1-877792-80-9)
- There Is No Wind Through the Trees on a Treeless Beach (ISBN 1-877792-11-X)
- TKO: Lost Nights in Tokyo (ISBN 1-877792-08-X)
- Varanasi and Bodh Gaya: Shade of the Bodhi Tree: A Photographic Exploration (ISBN 978-1-877792-79-3)
- War (ISBN 1-877792-17-9)
- Wet Dreams and Placid Silence (ISBN 1-877792-19-5)
- Wo' Ton of the Blue Vision (ISBN 1-877792-16-0)
- Yoga the Inner Journey (ISBN 0-595-16549-4)
- Zen and Modern Consciousness (ISBN 1-877792-52-7)
- Zen Buddhism: The Pathway to Nirvana (ISBN 1-877792-36-5)
- Zen Filmmaking (ISBN 1-877792-47-0)
- Zen Filmmaking 2: Further Writings on the Cinematic Arts (ISBN 978-1-877792-88-5)
- Zen in the Blink of an Eye (ISBN 1-877792-41-1)
- Zen Mind Life Thoughts (ISBN 978-1-877792-81-6)
- Zen O'Clock: Time to Be (ISBN 1-57863-124-6)
- Zen-kapu a belső békességhez (ISBN 963-9219-55-X)
- Zen: Tales from the Journey (ISBN 1-877792-43-8)
- ZenÓra Mesterek és harci művészetek (ISBN 963-9219-07-X)
- Zero One (ISBN 1-877792-20-9)

=== Partial filmography ===
- 9mm Sunrise (2006) (also Producer/Director)
- Guns of El Chupacabra (1997) (also Producer)
- Hitman City (2003) (also Producer/Director)
- Interview: The Documentary (2005) (Producer/Director)
- Killer: Dead or Alive (2006) (also Producer/Director)
- Max Hell Frog Warrior (1996) (also Producer/Director) (a.k.a. Hell Comes to Frogtown III, Toad Warrior and Max Hell Comes to Frogtown)
- One Shot Sam (2006) (Director)
- Return of the Roller Blade Seven (1993) (also Producer)
- Samurai Johnny Frankenstein (1993) (also Producer/Director)
- Samurai Vampire Bikers From Hell (1992) (also Producer/Director); martial art based vampire film directed by and starring Shaw. released with the alternative titles, "Alexander Hell" and "Hellzone Rangers."
- Super Hero Central (2004) (also Producer/Director)
- The Final Kiss (2005) (also Producer/Director)
- The Legend of the Roller Blade Seven (1992) (also Producer)
- The Rock n' Roll Cops (2003) (also Producer/Director)
- The Roller Blade Seven (1991) (also Producer)
- Undercover X (2001) (also Producer/Director)
- Vampire Blvd. (2004) (also Producer/Director)
- Vampire Noir (2007) (also Producer/Director)
