= Robert Z'Dar =

American actor (1950–2015)

- Z'Dar in Samurai Cop (1991)
- Born: Robert James Zdarsky; June 3, 1950; Chicago, Illinois, U.S.
- Died: March 30, 2015 (aged 64); Pensacola, Florida, U.S.
- Other names: Robert Darcy; Robert West; Bobby Z'Dar; Bobby Zdar; Robert Zdar
- Occupations: Actor; film producer
- Years active: 1976–2015

Robert James Zdarsky (June 3, 1950 – March 30, 2015), better known by his stage name Robert Z'Dar, was an American character actor and film producer, best known for his role as officer Matt Cordell in the cult slasher film Maniac Cop (1988) and its two sequels, as well as appearances in Tango & Cash (1989) and Samurai Cop (1991).

Z'Dar worked mainly in low-budget B movies and direct-to-video features, but occasionally in mainstream Hollywood films and television. Due to his cherubism, a medical condition resulting in an enlarged jawline, Z'dar had a unique and easily recognizable look, which aided his career as he usually portrayed villains.

A prolific actor, Z'Dar appeared in 121 films over the course of his 39-year career.

== Early life ==
Robert James Zdarsky was born on June 3, 1950, in Chicago, Illinois, Z'Dar was of Lithuanian descent. He first started acting while attending Proviso West High School in Hillside, Illinois. After high school, Z'Dar attended Arizona State University where he received a bachelor of fine arts and played on the university football team. After graduation, Z'Dar returned to Chicago, where he was employed as a Chicago police officer, member of the band Nova Express, commercial jingle writer, and Chippendales dancer.

== Acting career ==
Eventually Z'Dar moved to Los Angeles to pursue a career in acting. His first feature-film appearance was in the exploitation women-in-prison film Hellhole (1985). He appeared in several more films in close succession, including Hot Chili (also 1985), The Night Stalker, Cherry 2000 (both 1987), The Killing Game, and Grotesque (both 1988).

Z'Dar's name became recognizable when he played Matt Cordell in 1988's Maniac Cop, a film about a back-from-the-dead hero NYPD cop turned evil avenger, who brutally murders people. Z'Dar reprised his role in the 1990 sequel and Badge of Silence (1993).

It was perhaps Z'Dar's performance in Maniac Cop that landed him the role of "Face" in 1989's Tango & Cash, alongside action stars Sylvester Stallone and Kurt Russell. He went on to appear in films such as Killing American Style (1988), The Final Sanction, A Gnome Named Gnorm (both 1990), Beastmaster 2: Through the Portal of Time, Mobsters, Samurai Cop (all 1991), Return to Frogtown, Marching Out of Time (both 1993), Death from Above (2011), Meltdown (2009), and Easter Sunday (2014).

Robert Z'Dar appeared in more than 121 films and television episodes, with at least one film appearance per year in 27 of the last 29 years of his career (missing only 1986 and 2001). He continued making at least one film every year despite a serious back injury he suffered in 2002 on a movie set. Two of Z'Dar's films, Soultaker (1990) and Future War (1997), appeared in season 10 of Mystery Science Theater 3000, increasing his renown somewhat.

In 2012, he was inducted to International Indie Filmmakers Hall of Fame at The Indie Gathering film festival.

== Death ==
While appearing at Pensacon in Pensacola, Florida, Z'Dar was hospitalized for chest pains. He seemed to recover, but subsequently went into cardiac arrest and died on March 30, 2015 at the age of 64, one month after his hospitalization. He had previously battled throat cancer, and heart failure.

== Selected filmography ==
Year	Title	Role	Notes
1987	The Night Stalker	Chuck Sommers	
1987	Cherry 2000	Chet	
1988	Maniac Cop	Officer Matt Cordell / The Maniac Cop	
1988	Killing American Style	Tony Stone	
1988	Grotesque	Eric	
1989	Tango & Cash	"Face"	
1990	The Final Sanction	Sergeant Sergei Schvackov	
1990	Maniac Cop 2	Officer Matt Cordell / The Maniac Cop	
1990	Soultaker	Angel of Death	
1990	A Gnome Named Gnorm	Reggie	
1991	Beastmaster 2: Through the Portal of Time	Zavic	
1991	Samurai Cop	Yamashita	Direct-to-video
1991	The Killer's Edge	Rocco	Credited as "Blood Money"
1991	The Big Sweat	Troudou	Direct-to-video
1992	The Legend of Wolf Mountain	Jocko Painter	Credited as "Bankrobber"
1992	Shadow of the Dragon	Captain Washington	
1992	Maniac Cop III: Badge of Silence	Officer Matt Cordell / The Maniac Cop	
1993	Return to Frogtown	Sam Hell	
1994	Cyberkidz	Zeist	
1996	Red Line	Gene	
1997	Guns of El Chupacabra	Z-Man Lord Invader	Direct-to-video
1997	Future War	Cyborg Master	
1997	Pocket Ninjas	Cobra Khan	
1999	Tyrone	"Assface"	
2004	Super Hell	Granny Bob	Direct-to-video
2009	Meltdown	Eddie "Crazy Eddie"	
2014	Easter Sunday	Easter Bunny / Serial Killer	Direct-to-video
2015	A Blood Story	Gerry "The Jaw"	Posthumous release
2016	Chasing Gold	Roger Gleason	Posthumous release
2019	High on the Hog	The Mayor	Posthumous release
2020	Spring Fever	Roth "Chile" DeVille	Posthumous release
