= List of vampire films =

This is a list of vampire films.

== Dracula films ==
There have been numerous films based on Dracula, an 1897 Gothic horror novel by Irish author Bram Stoker. It introduced the character of Count Dracula, and established many conventions of subsequent vampire fantasy. The novel tells the story of Dracula's attempt to move from Transylvania to England so that he may find new blood and spread the undead curse and of the battle between Dracula and a small group of men and a woman led by Professor Abraham Van Helsing. Some filmmakers have also combined fact with fiction and merged Stoker's Dracula with the real Vlad III Dracula, often called Vlad Tepes and Vlad the Impaler.
| Title | Release year | Country | Director | Leading cast | Notes |
|---|---|---|---|---|---|
| Drakula (Дракула) | 1920 | Russia | Some sources have credited Victor Tourjansky. | | Nothing regarding this silent film is known to survive; there are no known production stills, and there is very little information about this film available. Most sources agree that the existence of this film is questionable, because no details appear to have survived and its existence is not verifiable. |
| Dracula's Death (Drakula halála) | 1921 | Hungary | Károly Lajthay | Erik Vanko, Lena Myl, Carl Goetz | An unlicensed Hungarian adaptation. First known film appearance of Dracula. This film has been lost since its release. |
| Nosferatu Nosferatu Nosferatu the Vampyre Vampire in Venice (Nosferatu a Venezia) Shadow of the Vampire Nosferatu Nosferatu | 1922; 1979; 1988; 2000; 2023; 2024 | Germany; West Germany; Italy; Luxembourg/United Kingdom/United States; United States; United States | F. W. Murnau; Werner Herzog; Augusto Caminito, Klaus Kinski; E. Elias Merhige; David Lee Fisher, Robert Eggers | Max Schreck, Gustav von Wangenheim; Klaus Kinski, Isabelle Adjani, Bruno Ganz; Klaus Kinski, Barbara De Rossi, Yorgo Voyagis; John Malkovich, Doug Jones (actor) , Willem Dafoe, Cary Elwes; Bill Skarsgård, Nicholas Hoult, Lily-Rose Depp, Willem Dafoe | An unlicensed adaptation featuring "Count Orlok" (i.e., Count Dracula); Remake of Murnau's silent classic. Kinski returns as Nosferatu. An Oscar-nominated film fictionalizing the making of the 1922 film. A project that took 10 years to make since being funded on Kickstarter in December 2014; Eggers' passion project, being a remake of F. W. Murnau's silent classic. |
| Universal Studios Dracula series Dracula Dracula's Daughter Son of Dracula House of Frankenstein House of Dracula Abbott and Costello Meet Frankenstein | 1931; 1936; 1943; 1944; 1945; 1948 | United States; United States; United States; United States; United States; United States | Tod Browning; Lambert Hillyer; Robert Siodmak; Erle C. Kenton; Erle C. Kenton; Charles Barton | Bela Lugosi; Gloria Holden; Lon Chaney Jr. John Carradine; John Carradine; Bela Lugosi, Abbott and Costello | The first Universal Studios Dracula film. First sequel to the 1931 film. Second sequel to the 1931 film. Carradine plays Dracula as part of an ensemble cast. The final serious Universal Studios Dracula film. Lugosi played Dracula for the last time in this classic horror/comedy. |
| Drácula | 1931 | United States | George Melford | Carlos Villarías, Lupita Tovar, Barry Norton | Spanish-language version of the 1931 Bela Lugosi film, made simultaneously by Universal Studios with the Lugosi film and using the same sets on a timeshare basis. |
| Drakula İstanbul'da (Dracula in Istanbul) | 1953 | Turkey | Mehmet Muhtar | Annie Ball, Cahit Irgat, Ayfer Feray | A rarely-seen Turkish film based on the 1928 novel Kazıklı Voyvoda (Impaler Voivode) by Ali Riza Seyfi, which is more or less a translation of Stoker's novel. Both the novel and the film make an explicit connection with the historical Vlad the Impaler. This is possibly the first film to depict Dracula with elongated canines. |
| The Return of Dracula | 1958 | United States | Paul Landres | Francis Lederer, Norma Eberhardt, Ray Stricklyn | A horror film set in Carlton (a small town in California) and in the 1950s, where Count Dracula arrives, having killed and assumed the identity of a European artist. |
| Hammer Films Dracula series Dracula The Brides of Dracula Dracula: Prince of Darkness Dracula Has Risen from the Grave Taste the Blood of Dracula Scars of Dracula Dracula A.D. 1972 The Satanic Rites of Dracula The Legend of the 7 Golden Vampires | 1958; 1960; 1966; 1968; 1970; 1970; 1972; 1973; 1974 | United Kingdom; United Kingdom; United Kingdom; United Kingdom; United Kingdom; United Kingdom; United Kingdom; United Kingdom; United Kingdom | Terence Fisher; Terence Fisher; Terence Fisher; Peter Sasdy; Freddie Francis; Roy Ward Baker; Alan Gibson; Alan Gibson; Roy Ward Baker | Peter Cushing, Christopher Lee; Peter Cushing, David Peel; Christopher Lee; Christopher Lee; Christopher Lee; Christopher Lee; Christopher Lee, Peter Cushing; Christopher Lee, Peter Cushing; Peter Cushing | The first Hammer Dracula film. Also known as Horror of Dracula. Cushing returns to take on Baron Meinster, Dracula's vampire disciple. First sequel in which Dracula returns from the dead. Dracula again returns from the dead. Dracula is brought back to life via a Black Mass. Dracula again returns from the dead. First film in the series to take place in the early 1970s. Second and final film in the series to take place in the early 1970s. Dracula is portrayed by John Forbes-Robertson instead of Lee. |
| Batman Dracula | 1964 | United States | Andy Warhol | Tally Brown, Beverly Grant, Jack Smith | Fan film screened only at Warhol's art exhibits. A fan of the Batman comic series, Warhol made the movie as an "homage". Jack Smith appeared as both Batman and his nemesis, Count Dracula. |
| Billy the Kid Versus Dracula | 1966 | United States | William Beaudine | Chuck Courtney, John Carradine, Melinda Plowman | Billy the Kid must stop Dracula (Carradine) from taking his fiancé and making her his vampire bride. The name Dracula is not used in the film, only in the title. |
| Batman Fights Dracula | 1967 | Philippines | Leody M. Diaz | Jing Abalos, Ramon d'Salva, Dante Rivero | Lost film about a mad scientist named Dr. Zorba (d'Salva) who, after repeatedly being defeated by Batman (Abalos), finds a way to resurrect the wicked Count Dracula (Rivero), control him, and even make him stronger, rendering him invincible towards traditional ways of killing him, such as Christian crosses. |
| Dracula | 1968 | United Kingdom | Patrick Dromgoole | Denholm Elliott, Bernard Archard, Nina Baden-Semper | An episode of the U.K. anthology TV series Mystery and Imagination (Series 4, Episode 3). |
| Blood of Dracula's Castle | 1969 | United States | Al Adamson, Jean Hewitt | John Carradine, Paula Raymond, Alexander D'Arcy | Occupying Falcon Rock Castle in modern-day Arizona and hiding behind the identities of Count and Countess Townsend, Count Dracula (D'Arcy) and his vampire wife (Raymond) lure pretty young girls to the castle to be drained of blood by their butler George (John Carradine), who then mixes real Bloody Marys for the couple, which they drink from martini glasses. |
| Count Dracula (Nachts, wenn Dracula erwacht) | 1970 | Spain/Italy/West Germany/United Kingdom | Jesús Franco | Christopher Lee, Herbert Lom, Klaus Kinski | Lee's first non-Hammer Dracula film. |
| Jonathan | 1970 | West Germany | Hans W. Geißendörfer | Jürgen Jung, Hans-Dieter Jendreyko, Paul Albert Krumm | An arty take with Jonathan (Jung) infiltrating the castle of the undead Count (Krumm) who is never actually named in the film. |
| Count Dracula (Hrabě Drakula) | 1971 | Czechoslovakia | Anna Procházková | Ilja Racek, Jan Schánilec, Klára Jerneková | This TV film was the first adaptation to be directed by a woman. Reasonably faithful to the novel, except for the exclusion of Renfield. It was the first adaptation to show on screen blood-exchange scene between Dracula and Mina. |
| The Vampire Happening | 1971 | West Germany | Freddie Francis | Pia Degermark, Thomas Hunter, Yvor Murillo | |
| Vampyros Lesbos | 1971 | West Germany/Spain | Jesús Franco | Soledad Miranda, Ewa Strömberg, Andrea Montchal | An entry in the "lesbian vampire" subgenre with Soledad Miranda as Nadine, a descendant of the Dracula family. |
| Dracula vs. Frankenstein | 1971 | United States | Al Adamson | Lon Chaney Jr., J. Carrol Naish, Zandor Vorkov | |
| Blacula Blacula Scream Blacula Scream | 1972; 1973 | United States; United States | William Crain; Bob Kelljan | William Marshall, Vonetta McGee, Denise Nicholas; William Marshall, Pam Grier, Don Mitchell | A blaxploitation cult film in which an African prince is turned into a vampire by Dracula. Sequel. |
| The Devil's Wedding Night (Il plenilunio delle vergini) | 1973 | Italy | Luigi Batzella, Joe D'Amato | Mark Damon, Rosalba Neri, Esmeralda Barros | Countess Dolingen De Vries, Dracula's widow, murders beautiful girls so that she can bathe in their blood. |
| Count Dracula's Great Love (El gran amor del conde Drácula) | 1974 | Spain | Javier Aguirre | Paul Naschy, Haydée Politoff, Rosanna Yanni, Ingrid Garbo, Mirta Miller | Count Dracula finds himself falling for a 19th-century traveler who stops by his Spanish castle. |
| Bram Stoker's Dracula | 1974 | United Kingdom | Dan Curtis | Jack Palance, Simon Ward, Nigel Davenport, Fiona Lewis | A Dan Curtis production. The first film to make the Dracula character and the historical Dracula, Vlad the Impaler, one and the same person and feature a romance between Dracula and a former love reincarnated in a new body (an element that was taken from Dan Curtis' Gothic soap opera Dark Shadows (1966-1971)). |
| Blood for Dracula | 1974 | Italy/France | Paul Morrissey | Joe Dallesandro, Udo Kier, Vittorio de Sica | Also released as Andy Warhol's Dracula (X-rated). |
| Vampira (1974 film) | 1974 | United Kingdom | Clive Donner | David Niven, Teresa Graves, Jennie Linden,Nicky Henson, Peter Bayliss | Re-titled Old Dracula for release in the United States. |
| Tender Dracula, or Confessions of a Blood Drinker | 1974 | France | Pierre Grunstein | Peter Cushing, Alida Valli, Miou-Miou, Bernard Menez, Nathalie Courval, Stephane Shandor | Two scriptwriters and two girls are ordered by their director to visit the castle home of a horror actor to talk him out of his intention to change from horror films to romantic ones |
| Deafula | 1975 | United States | Peter Wechsberg | Peter Wolf, Lee Darel, Dudley Hemstreet, Gary R. Holstrom | It was the first American Sign Language feature film ever made. |
| Dracula and Son (Dracula, père et fils) | 1976 | France | Edouard Molinaro | Christopher Lee, Bernard Ménez | A French comedy. Lee's second and final non-Hammer Dracula film. |
| Dracula's Dog | 1977 | United States/Italy | Albert Band | José Ferrer, Michael Pataki, Arlene Martel | Also known as Zoltan...Hound of Dracula in the U.K.; a low-budget film in which the descendant of Dracula takes second billing to Zoltan, a vampiric Doberman Pinscher. |
| Count Dracula | 1977 | United Kingdom | Philip Saville | Louis Jourdan, Frank Finlay, Susan Penhaligon, Judi Bowker | The first BBC production. |
| Dracula | 1979 | United Kingdom/United States | John Badham | Frank Langella, Laurence Olivier, Donald Pleasence, Kate Nelligan | A film in the Gothic/romantic tradition. Universal Studios' remake of their 1931 film with Bela Lugosi. |
| Nocturna: Granddaughter of Dracula | 1979 | United States | Harry Hurwitz | Yvonne De Carlo, John Carradine, Nai Bonet | An offbeat disco-era urban comedy. |
| Love at First Bite | 1979 | United States | Stan Dragoti | George Hamilton, Susan Saint James, Richard Benjamin | A romantic comedy spoof. |
| Dracula: Sovereign of the Damned | 1980 | Japan | Minoru Okazaki | Kenji Utsumi | Anime television movie based on The Tomb of Dracula |
| Fracchia Vs. Dracula (Fracchia contro Dracula) | 1985 | Italy | Neri Parenti | Paolo Villaggio, Edmund Purdom, Gigi Reder | A parody of Dracula and horror movies that follows Fracchia's task of selling real estate in Transylvania, namely the castle of Count Dracula. |
| The Monster Squad | 1987 | United States | Fred Dekker | André Gower, Robby Kiger, Duncan Regehr | Had not only Dracula and the other Universal monsters in it, but his vampire brides also appeared. |
| Waxwork | 1988 | United States | Anthony Hickox | Zach Galligan, Deborah Foreman, Miles O'Keeffe | Comedy Horror film with Dracula as one of the monsters. |
| To Die For To Die For Son of Darkness: To Die For II | 1988; 1991 | United States; United States | Deran Sarafian; David Price | Brendan Hughes, Sydney Walsh, Steve Bond; Rosalind Allen, Steve Bond, Michael Praed | Also known as Dracula: The Love Story. Sequel with Praed replacing Hughes as Vlad III Dracula. |
| Bram Stoker's Dracula | 1992 | United States | Francis Ford Coppola | Gary Oldman, Winona Ryder, Anthony Hopkins, Keanu Reeves | Inspired by Dark Shadows and Bram Stoker's Dracula (1973), this film also merges a reincarnation romance with the medieval story of Vlad the Impaler. |
| Nadja | 1994 | United States | Michael Almereyda | Elina Löwensohn, Peter Fonda, Karl Geary | A post-modern vampire film set in contemporary New York City with Peter Fonda as both Dracula and Van Helsing. |
| Dracula: Dead and Loving It | 1995 | United States/France | Mel Brooks | Leslie Nielsen, Peter MacNicol, Steven Weber | A parody of Dracula films. |
| Vampirella | 1996 | United States | Jim Wynorski | Talisa Soto, Roger Daltrey, Richard Joseph Paul | Based on the comic book of the same name, features Dracula as the main antagonist. |
| Modern Vampires | 1998 | United States | Richard Elfman | Casper Van Dien, Natasha Gregson Wagner, Rod Steiger | A horror/black comedy film about a vampire named Dallas who was banished by "the Count" (i.e., Count Dracula) being pursued by Dr. Fredrick Van Helsing. |
| Dark Prince: The True Story of Dracula | 2000 | United States | Joe Chappelle | Rudolf Martin, Jane March, Christopher Brand | A horror/war TV film for the USA Network that tells the story of Vlad Dracula, the historical figure who gave Bram Stoker's novel Dracula his name with an ending that implies that he became the very vampire for which his name is famous. |
| Dracula 2000 Dracula 2000 Dracula II: Ascension Dracula III: Legacy | 2000; 2003; 2005 | United States; United States/Romania; United States/Romania | Patrick Lussier; Patrick Lussier; Patrick Lussier | Jonny Lee Miller, Justine Waddell, Gerard Butler; Jason Scott Lee, Jason London, Craig Sheffer; Jason Scott Lee, Jason London, Alexandra Wescourt | A modern reworking of the story. First sequel. Second sequel. |
| The Breed | 2001 | United States | Michael Oblowitz | Adrian Paul, Bokeem Woodbine, Bai Ling | In a dystopic future in which vampires are a marginalized race living in formerly Jewish ghettos, two officers, one human and the other a vampire, investigate a series of strange murders with the aid of female vampire Lucy Westenra (played by Bai Ling). |
| Dracula, Pages from a Virgin's Diary | 2002 | Canada | Guy Maddin | Zhang Wei-Qiang, Tara Birtwhistle, David Moroni | A wordless film interpretation of the Royal Winnipeg Ballet's take of Bram Stoker's Dracula. |
| The League of Extraordinary Gentlemen | 2003 | United Kingdom/United States | Stephen Norrington | Sean Connery, Naseeruddin Shah, Shane West | Mina Harker, now a vampire thanks to her encounter with Dracula, is a member of the League. |
| Van Helsing | 2004 | United States | Stephen Sommers | Hugh Jackman, Kate Beckinsale, Richard Roxburgh | A horror/action-adventure film only loosely connected to the novel Dracula. Van Helsing's appearance is heavily based on the look of Vampire Hunter D, a vampire hunter who is the implied son of Dracula. |
| Blade: Trinity | 2004 | United States | David S. Goyer | Wesley Snipes, Jessica Biel, Dominic Purcell | Drake the vampire is supposed to have had many aliases throughout the centuries, Stoker's Dracula being one of them. |
| Dracula 3000 | 2004 | United States/South Africa | Darrell Roodt | Casper Van Dien, Erika Eleniak, Tom "Tiny" Lister | A TV film that brings Count Dracula into outer space in the distant 30th century. |
| The Batman vs. Dracula | 2005 | United States | Michael Goguen | Rino Romano, Peter Stormare, Tara Strong | Animated film based on The Batman TV series in which the Dark Knight faces the Prince of Darkness, Count Dracula. |
| Bram Stoker's Dracula's Curse | 2006 | United States | Leigh Scott | Thomas Downey, Rhett Giles, Christina Rosenberg | A direct-to-video release from The Asylum. |
| Dracula | 2006 | United Kingdom | Bill Eagles | Marc Warren, David Suchet, Sophia Myles | The second BBC version, with a reworked plot. |
| Hellsing Ultimate | 2006 | Japan | Tomokazu Tokoro, Hideki Tonokatsu | Jouji Nakata, Fumiko Orikasa, Yoshiko Sakakibara | A remake of Hellsing, following the original manga series more closely. |
| Bram Stoker's Dracula's Guest | 2008 | United States | Michael Feifer | Amy Lyndon, Wes Ramsey, Count Dracula | Loosely based on the title story from Bram Stoker's 1914 short story collection Dracula's Guest and Other Weird Stories. |
| The Librarian: Curse of the Judas Chalice | 2008 | United States | Marco Schnabel | Noah Wyle, Bob Newhart, Jane Curtin | A TV film featuring a plot by former KGB agents to restore the Soviet Union by resurrecting Dracula with the Judas Chalice, a goblet made out of the thirty pieces of silver given to Judas Iscariot for his betrayal of Jesus Christ. |
| Scary or Die | 2012 | United States | Igor Meglic | Charles Rahi Chun, Alexandria Choi, Azion Iemekeve | A horror/comedy anthology film featuring one vampire segment ("Taejung's Lament") with vampire hunter Van Helsing. |
| Hotel Transylvania Hotel Transylvania Hotel Transylvania 2 Hotel Transylvania 3: Summer Vacation Hotel Transylvania: Transformania | 2012; 2015; 2018; 2022 | United States; United States; United States; United States | Genndy Tartakovsky; Genndy Tartakovsky; Genndy Tartakovsky; Jennifer Kluska, Derek Drymon | Adam Sandler, Andy Samberg, Selena Gomez; Adam Sandler, Andy Samberg, Selena Gomez; Adam Sandler, Andy Samberg, Selena Gomez; Brian Hull, Selena Gomez | A computer-animated monster comedy film. First sequel. Second sequel. Third sequel. Fourth sequel. |
| Dracula 3D | 2012 | Italy/France/Spain | Dario Argento | Thomas Kretschmann, Rutger Hauer, Marta Gastini, Asia Argento | Not a direct adaptation of Bram Stoker's Dracula, but features several elements from the novel. |
| Saint Dracula 3D | 2012 | United Arab Emirates | Rupesh Paul | Mitch Powell, Patricia Duarte, Daniel Shayler | An independent horror film. |
| Dracula 2012 | 2013 | India | Vinayan | Sudheer Sukumaran, Monal Gajjar, Shraddha Das | A 3-D horror film. |
| Dracula: The Dark Prince | 2013 | United States | Pearry Reginald Teo | Luke Roberts, Jon Voight, Kelly Wenham | A horror/fantasy film shot in Romania. |
| Dracula Untold | 2014 | United States | Gary Shore | Luke Evans, Dominic Cooper, Sarah Gadon, Charles Dance | A horror/dark fantasy film where Dracula is once again Vlad the Impaler. |
| Boys from County Hell | 2020 | Ireland | Chris Baugh | Jack Rowan (actor), Nigel O'Neill, Louisa Harland, Michael Hough | Small town Irish vampire comedy about friends and family fighting the local legend of the Abhartach which was supposedly Bram Stoker's inspiration for Dracula |
| Renfield | 2023 | United States | Chris McKay | Nicolas Cage, Nicholas Hoult, Awkwafina | A big-studio horror/comedy. Set in 21st-century New Orleans, the Count's servant R. M. Renfield (Hoult) falls in love with traffic cop Rebecca Quincy (Awkwafina), and decides to finally stand up to Vlad the Impaler/Dracula (Cage) and break free. |
| The Last Voyage of the Demeter | 2023 | United States | André Øvredal | Javier Botet, Corey Hawkins, Aisling Franciosi, Liam Cunningham, David Dastmalchian | A film with the backing of multiple big studios, based on the chapter "The Captain's Log" of Bram Stoker's 1897 novel. |
| Monster Mash | 2024 | United States | Jose Prendes | Michael Madsen, Ethan Daniel Corbett, Emma Reinagel | Dracula, the Werewolf, the Mummy, and the Invisible Man must work together to stop Dr. Frankenstein from creating an unstoppable monster. |
| Abigail | 2024 | United States | Matt Bettinelli-Olpin, Tyler Gillett | Alisha Weir, Melissa Barrera, Dan Stevens | A big studio reimagining of 1936's Dracula's Daughter, the Universal Classic Monsters film; Abigail (Weir), daughter of "a Russian mobster", is kidnapped by an ensemble cast. Locked inside a mansion, the hunted Abigail becomes the hunter. |
| Vampire Zombies... from Space! | 2024 | Canada | Mike Stasko] | Jakob Skrzypa, Alex Forman, Mike Stasko | From the depths of space, Dracula has devised his most dastardly plan yet; turning the residents of the small town of Marlow into his personal army of vampire zombies! |
| Abraham's Boys (film) | 2025 | United States | Natasha Kermani | Titus Welliver, Jocelin Donahue, Judah Mackey, Aurora Perrineau, Brady Hepner | Based on the short story Abraham’s Boy’s by Joe Hill (writer). |
| Dracula | 2025 | France/United Kingdom | Luc Besson | Caleb Landry Jones, Christoph Waltz, Matilda De Angelis, Zoë Bleu Sidel, Salomon Passariello, Haymon Maria Buttinger | Dracula: A Love Tale in select countries. |

== Carmilla films ==
There have been numerous films based on Carmilla, an 1872 Gothic novella by Irish author Joseph Sheridan Le Fanu and one of the early works of vampire fiction, predating Bram Stoker's Dracula (1897) by 26 years. The story is narrated by a young woman preyed upon by a female vampire named Carmilla, later revealed to be Mircalla, Countess Karnstein (Carmilla is an anagram of Mircalla). The character is a prototypical example of the lesbian vampire, expressing romantic desires toward the protagonist.
| Title | Release year | Country | Director | Leading cast | Notes |
|---|---|---|---|---|---|
| Vampyr | 1932 | Germany/France | Carl Theodor Dreyer | Julian West | A loose adaptation with all references to lesbian sexuality deleted by the director. |
| Blood and Roses (Et mourir de plaisir) | 1960 | France/Italy | Roger Vadim | Mel Ferrer, Elsa Martinelli, Annette Stroyberg | The second screen adaptation and the first film in the lesbian vampire genre. Filmed in both English and French. |
| Terror in the Crypt (La cripta e l'incubo) | 1964 | Italy/Spain | Camillo Mastrocinque | Christopher Lee, Adriana Ambesi, Pier Anna Quaglia | A more-or-less faithful adaptation. Also known as Crypt of the Vampire in the U.S. and Crypt of Horror in the U.K. |
| The Karnstein Trilogy The Vampire Lovers Lust for a Vampire Twins of Evil | 1970; 1971; 1971 | United Kingdom; United Kingdom; United Kingdom | Roy Ward Baker; Jimmy Sangster; John Hough | Ingrid Pitt, George Cole, Kate O'Mara, Peter Cushing; Yutte Stensgaard, Michael Johnson, Ralph Bates; Peter Cushing, Mary Collinson, Madeleine Collinson | Hammer's adaptation set a trend for lesbian erotica in the genre. First sequel. Second sequel. |
| The Blood Spattered Bride (La Novia Ensangrentada) | 1972 | Spain | Vicente Aranda | Simón Andreu, Maribel Martín, Alexandra Bastedo | A Spanish horror film based on the text. The film has reached cult status for its mixture of horror, vampirism and seduction with lesbian overtones. |
| Alucarda | 1977 | Mexico | Juan López Moctezuma | Tina Romero, Claudio Brook | |
| Vampires vs. Zombies | 2004 | United States | Vince D'Amato | Bonny Giroux, C.S. Munro, Maratama Carlson | An independent horror film loosely based on the novella, but unlike Le Fanu's story, most of the action in the film takes place inside a car. |
| Lesbian Vampire Killers | 2009 | United Kingdom | Phil Claydon | James Corden, Mathew Horne, MyAnna Buring | A spoof of the lesbian vampire genre with Silvia Colloca as Carmilla. |
| The Unwanted | 2014 | United States | Bret Wood | Hannah Fierman, Christen Orr, William Katt | Relocates the story to the contemporary Southern United States. |
| The Carmilla Movie | 2017 | Canada | Spencer Maybee | Elise Bauman, Natasha Negovanlis | Based on the webseries Carmilla. |
| Carmilla | 2019 | United Kingdom | Emily Harris | Hannah Rae, Devrim Lingnau, Jessica Raine | |

== Elizabeth Bathory films ==
There have been a number of vampire films based on or inspired by Countess Elizabeth Báthory (1560-1614), a reputed serial killer from the noble family of Báthory, who owned land in the Kingdom of Hungary (now Hungary, Slovakia and Romania). Stories describing her vampire-like tendencies (most famously, the tale that she bathed in the blood of virgins to retain her youth) were generally recorded years after her death and are considered unreliable. Her story quickly became part of national folklore and her infamy persists to this day. She is often compared to Vlad the Impaler of Wallachia (on whom the fictional Count Dracula is partly based); some insist that she inspired Bram Stoker's novel Dracula (1897), though there is no evidence to support this hypothesis. Nicknames and literary epithets attributed to her include The Blood Countess and Countess Dracula.
| Title | Release year | Country | Director | Leading cast | Notes |
|---|---|---|---|---|---|
| Countess Dracula | 1971 | United Kingdom | Peter Sasdy | Ingrid Pitt, Nigel Green, Lesley-Anne Down | A Hammer Films production based on Countess Elizabeth Bathory. |
| Daughters of Darkness | 1971 | Belgium/France/West Germany | Harry Kümel | Delphine Seyrig, Danielle Ouimet, John Karlen | A film featuring Countess Elizabeth Bathory as a vampire. |
| Thirst | 1979 | Australia | Rod Hardy | Chantal Contouri, Max Phipps, David Hemmings | A vampire film featuring a female descendant of Countess Elizabeth Bathory. |
| Mama Dracula | 1980 | France/Belgium | Boris Szulzinger | Louise Fletcher, Maria Schneider, Marc-Henri Wajnberg | Based on Countess Elizabeth Bathory and her rejuvenation baths consisting of the blood of young virgins. |
| Eternal | 2004 | Canada | Wilhelm Liebenberg, Federico Sanchez | Sarah Manninen, Caroline Néron, Victoria Sanchez | Sixteenth-century Countess Elizabeth Bathory repeats her crimes in modern-day Montreal. |
| The Countess | 2009 | France/Germany | Julie Delpy | Julie Delpy, William Hurt, Daniel Brühl | A 17th century Hungarian countess embarks on a murderous undertaking, with the belief that bathing in the blood of virgins will preserve her beauty. |
| Chastity Bites | 2013 | United States | John V. Knowles | Allison Scagliotti, Francia Raisa, Eddy Rioseco | A feminist blogger and reporter for a school newspaper tries to stop Countess Elizabeth Báthory, who poses as an abstinence counselor in a high school, from killing the school's virgins to stay young and beautiful. |
| Fright Night 2: New Blood | 2013 | United States | Eduardo Rodríguez | Will Payne, Jaime Murray, Sean Power | A reimagining of the Fright Night films with a female character named "Gerri Dandridge", alias Countess Elizabeth Bathory. |

== Other vampire films ==
| Title | Release year | Country | Director | Leading cast | Notes |
|---|---|---|---|---|---|
| The House of the Devil (Le Manoir du Diable) | 1896 | France | Georges Méliès | Jehanne D'Alcy, Jules-Eugène Legris | Arguably the first vampire film. The "vampire" character is perhaps better identified as the devil, but does use the common vampire trope of transformation into a bat. Under four minutes long and in black-and-white. |
| The Vampire | 1913 | United States | Robert G. Vignola | Alice Hollister, Harry F. Millarde, Marguerite Courtot | Also co-written by Vignola. The earliest known surviving "vamp" film. |
| The Devil's Daughter | 1915 | United States | Frank Powell | Theda Bara, Paul Doucet, Victor Benoit | Based on the tragedy La Gioconda by Gabriele D'Annunzio. It is now considered lost. |
| A Night of Horror (Nächte des Grauens) | 1916 | German Empire | Richard Oswald, Arthur Robison | Emil Jannings, Laurence Köhler, Werner Krauss | The earliest known feature-length film to portray vampires. It is now considered lost. |
| Vampires of Warsaw (Wampiry Warszawy) | 1925 | Poland | Wiktor Biegański | Oktawian Kaczanowski, Halina Labedzka, Maria Balcerkiewiczówna | A silent murder mystery crime film featuring two Russian aristocrats determined to marry a wealthy Polish father/daughter to kill them for their inheritance. It is now considered lost. |
| London After Midnight London After Midnight Mark of the Vampire | 1927; 1935 | United States; United States | Tod Browning; Tod Browning | Lon Chaney; Bela Lugosi | A lost silent film. A talkie remake. |
| The Vampire Bat | 1933 | United States | Frank R. Strayer | Dwight Frye, Fay Wray, Lionel Atwill | |
| The Return of Doctor X | 1939 | United States | Vincent Sherman | Wayne Morris, Rosemary Lane, Humphrey Bogart | In an atypical role, Bogart plays a scientist executed for starving an infant to death who is re-animated with a need to consume blood. |
| The Return of the Vampire | 1943 | United States | Lew Landers | Bela Lugosi, Frieda Inescort, Nina Foch | Lugosi plays a vampire named Armand Tesla. |
| Mother Riley Meets the Vampire | 1952 | United Kingdom | John Gilling | Arthur Lucan, Bela Lugosi, María Mercedes | Also known as Vampire Over London. Lugosi plays a character named Von Housen who believes himself to be a vampire. A re-cut American version titled My Son, the Vampire was released in 1963 and featured an introductory segment with a song by American comedian Allen Sherman. |
| Vampire Moth (吸血蛾) | 1956 | Japan | Nobuo Nakagawa | Ryō Ikebe, Asami Kuji, Eijirō Tōno | The first Japanese vampire film, but one in which the creature is revealed not to be supernatural. |
| El vampiro The Vampire (El vampiro) The Vampire's Coffin (El ataúd del vampiro) | 1957; 1957 | Mexico; Mexico | Fernando Méndez; Fernando Méndez | Abel Salazar, Germán Robles, Ariadne Welter; Abel Salazar, Germán Robles, Ariadne Welter | Possibly the first film to depict a vampire with elongated canines. Sequel. |
| Not of This Earth Not of This Earth Not of This Earth Not of This Earth | 1957; 1988; 1995 | United States; United States; United States | Roger Corman; Jim Wynorski; Terence H. Winkless | Paul Birch, Beverly Garland; Traci Lords, Arthur Roberts; Michael York, Parker Stevenson | First film to feature an alien vampire. First remake. Second remake. |
| I Vampiri | 1957 | Italy | Riccardo Freda, Mario Bava | Gianna Maria Canale, Carlo D'Angelo, Dario Michaelis | About a series of murders of young women who are found with their blood drained. |
| The Vampire | 1957 | United States | Paul Landres | John Beal, Coleen Gray, Kenneth Tobey | A film about a non-supernatural vampire. |
| Blood of Dracula | 1957 | United States | Herbert L. Strock | Sandra Harrison, Louise Lewis, Gail Ganley | |
| Blood of the Vampire | 1958 | United Kingdom | Henry Cass | Donald Wolfit, Barbara Shelley, Vincent Ball | In Transylvania, a scientist uses the inmates of a prison for the criminally insane as sources for his gruesome blood typing and blood transfusion experiments that are keeping him alive. |
| Curse of the Undead | 1959 | United States | Edward Dein | Eric Fleming, Michael Pate, Kathleen Crowley | First U.S. Western/vampire film. |
| The Lady Vampire (女吸血鬼) | 1959 | Japan | Nobuo Nakagawa | Shigeru Amachi, Keinosuke Wada, Yōko Mihara | A woman who's been missing for twenty years suddenly turns up alive, and looking not a day older than when she vanished. |
| Uncle Was a Vampire (Tempi duri per i vampiri) | 1959 | Italy | Steno | Renato Rascel, Christopher Lee, Sylva Koscina | An Italian horror/comedy film. |
| The Vampire and the Ballerina (L'amante del vampiro) | 1960 | Italy | Renato Polselli | Hélène Rémy, Tina Gloriani, Walter Bigari | |
| Black Sunday (La maschera del demonio) | 1960 | Italy | Mario Bava | Barbara Steele, John Richardson, Andrea Checchi | Steele's debut film. |
| Atom Age Vampire (Seddok, l'erede di Satana) | 1960 | Italy | Anton Giulio Majano | Alberto Lupo, Susanne Loret, Sergio Fantoni | |
| The Playgirls and the Vampire (L'ultima preda del vampiro) | 1960 | Italy | Piero Regnoli | Lyla Rocco, Walter Brandi, Maria Giovannini | |
| The World of the Vampires (El mundo de los vampiros) | 1961 | Mexico | Alfonso Corona Blake | Guillermo Murray, Mauricio Garces, Erna Martha Baumann | About a vampire, Count Sergio Subotai, who seeks revenge against the descendant of an enemy family. The hero is a musician who knows how to play a piece of music that can kill vampires. |
| Slaughter of the Vampires (La strage dei vampiri) | 1962 | Italy | Roberto Mauri | Walter Brandi, Dieter Eppler, Graziella Granata | Later re-released as Curse of the Blood Ghouls. |
| The Bloody Vampire The Bloody Vampire (El vampiro sangriento) The Invasion of the Vampires (La invasión de los vampiros) | 1962 1963 | Mexico; Mexico | Miguel Morayta; Miguel Morayta | Begoña Palacios, Erna Martha Bauman, Raúl Farell; Erna Martha Bauman, Rafael del Río, Tito Junco | A count instructs his daughter Inés to confront Count Frankenhausen and his vampire henchmen. Followed by a sequel. |
| Santo vs. the Vampire Women (Santo vs. las Mujeres Vampiro) | 1962 | Mexico | Alfonso Corona Blake | Santo, Lorena Velázquez, Jaime Fernández | |
| The Family of the Vourdalak Black Sabbath (I tre volti della paura) The Vourdalak (Le Vourdalak) | 1963 2023 | Italy; France | Mario Bava; Adrien Beau | Boris Karloff, Mark Damon, Michèle Mercier; Kacey Mottet Klein, Ariane Labed, Grégoire Colin | A portmanteau film introduced by Karloff with three segments, the second of which is based on Alexei Tolstoy's vampire short story "The Family of the Vourdalak" (1839) about a father (played by Karloff) who returns to the family home as a vampire Another adaptation of the same story that uses a puppet for the grandfather |
| Kiss of the Vampire | 1963 | United Kingdom | Don Sharp | Clifford Evans, Noel Willman, Edward de Souza | A Hammer Films production. |
| I Am Legend The Last Man on Earth The Omega Man I Am Legend | 1964; 1971; 2007 | United States/Italy; United States; United States | Sidney Salkow, Ubaldo B. Ragona; Boris Sagal; Francis Lawrence | Vincent Price, Franca Bettoia, Emma Danieli; Charlton Heston, Anthony Zerbe, Rosalind Cash; Will Smith, Alice Braga, Dash Mihok | Film based on the novel I Am Legend by Richard Matheson. First remake. Second remake. |
| Cave of the Living Dead (Der Fluch der grünen Augen) | 1964 | West Germany/Yugoslavia | Ákos Ráthonyi | Adrian Hoven, Erika Remberg, Carl Möhner; Wolfgang Preiss, Karin Field, Emmerich Schrenk; John Kitzmiller | Also known as Night of the Vampires. |
| Planet of the Vampires (Terrore nello Spazio) | 1965 | Italy | Mario Bava | Barry Sullivan, Norma Bengell, Ángel Aranda | |
| Blood Bath | 1966 | United States | Jack Hill, Stephanie Rothman | William Campbell, Marissa Mathes, Lori Saunders | A delusional painter in Venice Beach, California believes himself to be the reincarnation of a vampire. |
| The Fearless Vampire Killers | 1967 | United Kingdom | Roman Polanski | Jack MacGowran, Roman Polanski, Sharon Tate | A semi-spoof of the genre. Also known as The Fearless Vampire Killers; or, Pardon Me, But Your Teeth Are in My Neck. |
| The Blood Demon | 1967 | West Germany | Harald Reinl | Christopher Lee, Karin Dor, Carl Lange | Also known as The Torture Chamber of Dr. Sadism or Castle of the Walking Dead. |
| The Blood Beast Terror | 1968 | United Kingdom | Vernon Sewell | Peter Cushing, Robert Flemyng, Wanda Ventham | Released in the U.S. as The Vampire-Beast Craves Blood (1968). |
| The Rape of the Vampire (Le viol du vampire) | 1968 | France | Jean Rollin | Solange Pradle, Bearard Letrou, Catherine Deville | Vampire erotica by cult French director Rollin. Followed by several more films of much the same sort by Rollin, each usually featuring several attractive naked Frenchwomen in vampiric roles, such as La vampire nue (see below). |
| The Mark of the Wolfman | 1968 | Spain | Enrique Lopez Eguiluz | Paul Naschy, Manuel Manzaneque, Dyanik Zurakowskah | |
| Goke, Body Snatcher from Hell (吸血鬼ゴケミドロ) | 1968 | Japan | Hajime Sato | Teruo Yoshida, Tomomi Saito, Eizo Kitamura | |
| Malenka, the Vampire's Niece | 1969 | Spain/ Italy | Amando de Ossorio | Anita Ekberg, John Hamilton, Diana Lorys, Adriana Ambesi | Later released as “Fangs of the Living Dead”. |
| The Nude Vampire (La vampire nue) | 1970 | France | Jean Rollin | Christine François, Olivier Rollin, Maurice Lemaitre | |
| The Bloodthirsty Trilogy anthology series The Vampire Doll (幽霊屋敷の恐怖 血を吸う人形) Lake of Dracula (呪いの館 血を吸う眼) Evil of Dracula (血を吸う薔薇) | 1970; 1971; 1974 | Japan; Japan; Japan | Michio Yamamoto; Michio Yamamoto; Michio Yamamoto | Kayo Matsuo, Akira Nakao, Yukiko Kobayashi; Choei Takahashi, Sanae Emi, Midori Fujita; Toshio Kurosawa, Kunie Tanaka, Katsuhiko Sasaki | Also known as Legacy of Dracula. Second film in the series. Third and final film in the series. |
| Count Yorga Count Yorga, Vampire The Return of Count Yorga | 1970; 1971 | United States; United States | Bob Kelljan; Bob Kelljan | Robert Quarry, Roger Perry, Michael Murphy; Robert Quarry, Mariette Hartley, Roger Perry | A contemporary vampire film. Count Yorga is revived by the supernatural Santa Ana winds. |
| Valerie and Her Week of Wonders (Valerie a týden divů) | 1970 | Czechoslovakia | Jaromil Jireš | Jaroslava Schallerová, Helena Anýžová, Karel Engel | |
| Dark Shadows House of Dark Shadows Dark Shadows | 1970; 2012 | United States; United States | Dan Curtis; Tim Burton | Jonathan Frid, Grayson Hall, Kathryn Leigh Scott; Johnny Depp, Michelle Pfeiffer | Film version of the Gothic soap opera Dark Shadows (1966-1971). Second version; a drama/comedy reimagining. |
| The Shiver of the Vampires (Le frisson des vampires) | 1971 | France | Jean Rollin | Sandra Julien, Jean-Marie Durand, Jacques Ribiolles | A young honeymooning couple stop for the night at an ancient castle. Unbeknownst to them, the castle is home to a horde of vampires, who have their own plans for the couple. |
| Requiem for a Vampire (Requiem pour un vampire) | 1971 | France | Jean Rollin | Marie-Pierre Castel, Mireille Dargent, Philippe Gasté | Two young women find themselves trapped in a haunted castle ruled by vampires. |
| The Velvet Vampire | 1971 | United States | Stephanie Rothman | Celeste Yarnall, Michael Blodgett, Sherry Miles | |
| Incense for the Damned (Bloodsuckers, Freedom Seeker and Doctors Wear Scarlet) | 1971 | United Kingdom | Robert Hartford-Davis | Patrick Macnee, Peter Cushing, Edward Woodward | Based on the 1960 Simon Raven novel Doctors Wear Scarlet. |
| Let's Scare Jessica to Death | 1971 | United States | John Hancock | Zohra Lampert, Barton Heyman, Kevin O'Connor | A psychologically fragile woman has nightmarish experiences and comes to believe that another strange and mysterious young woman that she has let into her home may actually be a vampire. |
| The Night Stalker | 1972 | United States | John Llewellyn Moxey | Darren McGavin, Simon Oakland, Carol Lynley, Barry Atwater | An ABC Movie of the Week produced by Dan Curtis. A direct sequel to this TV movie can be found in the fourth episode (of 20) of the subsequent spin-off TV series Kolchak: The Night Stalker called "The Vampire". |
| Vampire Circus | 1972 | United Kingdom | Robert Young | Adrienne Corri, Anthony Higgins, John Moulder-Brown | A Hammer Films production. |
| Grave of the Vampire | 1972 | United States | John Hayes | William Smith, Michael Pataki, Lyn Peters | Pataki stars as Professor Lockwood, alias Caleb Croft, a rapist and murderer resurrected as a vampire. |
| Deathmaster | 1972 | United States | Ray Danton | Robert Quarry | Hippie group falls into the hands of the vampire Khorda. |
| The Devil's Plaything (Vampire Ecstasy) | 1973 | Sweden, Switzerland, West Germany | Joseph W. Sarno | Nadia Henkowa, Anke Syring, Ulrike Butz, Nico Wolferstetter | Through satanic lesbian rites, a plan to return the vampire baroness, Varga, to life is set into motion. |
| The Norliss Tapes | 1973 | United States | Dan Curtis | Roy Thinnes, Angie Dickinson, Don Porter | A TV movie, and the pilot for a TV series that was never made, from Dan Curtis Productions. |
| Hannah, Queen of the Vampires | 1973 | Spain | Julio Salvador | Andrew Prine, Mark Damon, Patty Shepard | |
| The She-Butterfly (Leptirica) | 1973 | Yugoslavia | Đorđe Kadijević | Mirjana Nikolić, Petar Božović, Slobodan Perović | A Yugoslav made-for-TV film, often described as the "first real horror" in the history of Serbian and Yugoslav cinema. |
| Ganja & Hess Ganja & Hess Da Sweet Blood of Jesus | 1973; 2014 | United States; United States | Bill Gunn; Spike Lee | Marlene Clark, Duane Jones; Stephen Tyrone Williams, Rami Malek, Zaraah Abrahams, Felicia Pearson, Elvis Nolasco, Naté Bova | An anthropologist awakes with a thirst for blood after an assistant stabs him with a cursed dagger. The remake |
| Lemora | 1973 | United States | Richard Blackburn | Cheryl Smith, Hy Pyke, Lesley Gilb | A young girl in Prohibition-era America travels to a mysterious town to visit her father and uncovers a coterie of vampires. |
| Vampyres | 1974 | United Kingdom | José Ramón Larraz | Anulka Dziubinska, Marianne Morris, Murray Brown | An erotic film which features two lesbian vampires who inhabit a Gothic mansion in England; includes much in the way of bloody violence. |
| Captain Kronos – Vampire Hunter | 1974 | United Kingdom | Brian Clemens | Horst Janson, John Carson, Caroline Munro | A Hammer Films production. The first film of a planned film series that was never made. |
| Deathdream | 1974 | Canada | Bob Clark | Richard Backus, John Marley, Lynn Carlin | |
| Barry McKenzie Holds His Own | 1974 | Australia | Bruce Beresford | Barry Crocker, Barry Humphries, Donald Pleasence | |
| Mary, Mary, Bloody Mary | 1975 | Mexico | Juan López Moctezuma | Cristina Ferrare, John Carradine, David Young, Helena Rojo | |
| Rabid Rabid Rabid | 1977 2019 | Canada/United States; Canada | David Cronenberg; Jen Soska, Sylvia Soska | Marilyn Chambers, Frank Moore, Joe Silver; Laura Vandervoort, Ben Hollingsworth, Phil Brooks | |
| Martin | 1978 | United States | George A. Romero | John Amplas, Lincoln Maazel, Christine Forrest | A film about clinical vampirism ambiguously confused with folkloric vampirism. |
| Fascination | 1979 | France | Jean Rollin | Franca Maï, Brigitte Lahaie, Jean-Marie Lemaire | A thief seeks refuge in a castle owned by two seductive vampires. |
| The Monster Club | 1981 | United Kingdom | Roy Ward Baker | Vincent Price, Donald Pleasence, John Carradine | The first and only film in his entire career in which Price played a vampire. |
| Mystics in Bali | 1981 | Indonesia | H. Tjut Djalil | Ilona Agathe Bastian, Yos Santo, Sofia W.D. | Indonesian folk horror film about the Leyak. |
| The Vampire Inspector (髑髏検校) | 1982 | Japan | Yuichi Harada | Masakazu Tamura, Kaoru Yumi, Kazumi Kasama | A supernatural jidaigeki TV movie about Amakusa Shirō, a Japanese Christian of the Edo period and leader of the Shimabara Rebellion, who sold his soul to the devil and became a vampire. |
| Habit Habit Habit | 1982 1997 | United States; United States | Larry Fessenden; Larry Fessenden | Larry Fessenden, Meredith Snaider, Brendan Mee; Larry Fessenden, Meredith Snaider, Aaron Beall | A New York Bohemian falls for a beautiful, androgynous vampire. Remake. |
| The Hunger | 1983 | United Kingdom/United States | Tony Scott | Catherine Deneuve, David Bowie, Susan Sarandon | A love triangle between a doctor who specializes in sleep and aging research and a vampire couple. |
| The Keep | 1983 | United Kingdom/United States | Michael Mann | Scott Glenn, Alberta Watson, Jürgen Prochnow | Based on the F. Paul Wilson novel of the same name. |
| Bloodsuckers from Outer Space | 1984 | United States | Glen Coburn | Thom Meyes, Dennis Letts, Laura Ellis | A science fiction/black comedy/horror film. |
| Transylvania 6-5000 | 1985 | United States | Rudy De Luca | Jeff Goldblum Ed Begley Jr. Joseph Bologna Geena Davis | A horror comedy film about two tabloid reporters who travel to modern-day Transylvania to uncover the truth behind Frankenstein sightings. Along the way, they encounter other horror film staples—a mummy, a werewolf, and a vampire—each with a twist. |
| Lifeforce | 1985 | United Kingdom/United States | Tobe Hooper | Steve Railsback, Peter Firth, Frank Finlay | From the writer of Alien and the director of Poltergeist. Also known as Lifeforce: Space Aliens. |
| Fright Night Fright Night Fright Night Part 2 Fright Night Fright Night 2: New Blood | 1985; 1988; 2011; 2013 | United States; United States; United States; United States | Tom Holland; Tommy Lee Wallace; Craig Gillespie; Eduardo Rodríguez | Chris Sarandon, William Ragsdale, Amanda Bearse; Roddy McDowall, William Ragsdale, Traci Lind; Anton Yelchin, Colin Farrell, Christopher Mintz-Plasse; Will Payne, Jaime Murray, Sean Power | A cult classic. Sequel featuring a female vampire out to avenge her brother. Remake of the 1985 film. Direct-to-video re-imagining of the earlier films. |
| I Like Bats | 1985 | Poland | Grzegorz Warchol | Katarzyna Walter, Marek Barbasiewicz, Małgorzata Lorentowicz, Jonasz Kofta | |
| A Polish Vampire in Burbank | 1985 | United States | Mark Pirro | Mark Pirro, Lori Sutton, Bobbi Dorsch | A vampire/comedy film. |
| Mr. Vampire Mr. Vampire (僵屍先生) Mr. Vampire II (僵屍家族) Mr. Vampire III (靈幻先生) Mr. Vampire IV (僵屍叔叔) Mr. Vampire 1992 (新殭屍先生) | 1985; 1986; 1987; 1988; 1992 | Hong Kong; Hong Kong; Hong Kong; Hong Kong; Hong Kong | Ricky Lau; Ricky Lau; Ricky Lau; Ricky Lau; Ricky Lau | Ricky Hui, Moon Lee, Chin Siu-ho; Yuen Biao, Moon Lee, Lam Ching-ying; Lam Ching-ying, Richard Ng, Billy Lau; Anthony Chan, Wu Ma, Chin Kar-lok; Ricky Hui, Lam Ching-ying, Sandra Ng | The vampire in the film is based on the jiangshi of Chinese folklore. First sequel. Second sequel. Third sequel. Fourth sequel. |
| Once Bitten | 1985 | United States | Howard Storm | Lauren Hutton, Jim Carrey, Karen Kopins | A horror/comedy/fantasy film. |
| Vampire Hunter D Vampire Hunter D (吸血鬼ハンターD) Vampire Hunter D: Bloodlust (ブラッドラスト) | 1985; 2000 | Japan; Japan | Toyoo Ashida; Yoshiaki Kawajiri | Kaneto Shiozawa, Michie Tomizawa; Hideyuki Tanaka, Kōichi Yamadera | A Japanese OVA film. A follow-up anime film. |
| Vamp | 1986 | United States | Richard Wenk | Chris Makepeace, Sandy Baron, Robert Rusler | |
| Outback Vampires | 1987 | Australia | Colin Eggleston | Richard Morgan, Angela Kennedy, Brett Climo | |
| The Lost Boys The Lost Boys Lost Boys: The Tribe Lost Boys: The Thirst | 1987; 2008; 2010 | United States; United States; United States | Joel Schumacher; P. J. Pesce; Dario Piana | Corey Haim, Jami Gertz, Edward Herrmann; Tad Hilgenbrink, Angus Sutherland, Autumn Reeser; Corey Feldman, Jamison Newlander, Casey B. Dolan | A horror/comedy film. First sequel. Second sequel. |
| Salem's Lot A Return to Salem's Lot 'Salem's Lot | 1987; 2024 | United States; United States | Larry Cohen; Gary Dauberman | Michael Moriarty, Andrew Duggan, Samuel Fuller; Lewis Pullman, Makenzie Leigh, Alfre Woodard | Sequel to the classic 1979 TV miniseries Salem's Lot. Based on the novel of the same name by Stephen King |
| My Best Friend Is a Vampire | 1987 | United States | Jimmy Huston | Robert Sean Leonard, Cheryl Pollak, René Auberjonois | A newly made vampire tries to live as a "good" vampire and not feed on human blood. |
| Near Dark | 1987 | United States | Kathryn Bigelow | Adrian Pasdar, Jenny Wright, Lance Henriksen | |
| Vampire Princess Miyu (吸血姫 美夕) | 1988 | Japan | Toshiki Hirano | Naoko Watanabe, Masato Kubota, Rena Kurihara | Anime. |
| The Lair of the White Worm | 1988 | United Kingdom | Ken Russell | Amanda Donohoe, Hugh Grant, Catherine Oxenberg | Loosely based on the novel of the same name by Bram Stoker. |
| Dance of the Damned Dance of the Damned To Sleep with a Vampire | 1989; 1993 | United States; United States | Katt Shea; Adam Friedman | Starr Andreeff, Cyril O'Reilly, Debbie Nassar; Scott Valentine, Charlie Spradling, Richard Zobel | A vampire targets a stripper who is planning to commit suicide. Remake. |
| Sundown: The Vampire in Retreat | 1989 | United States | Anthony Hickox | David Carradine, Morgan Brittany, Bruce Campbell | A Western/comedy film about a ghost town that is populated by vampires. |
| Vampire's Kiss | 1989 | United States | Robert Bierman | Nicolas Cage, María Conchita Alonso, Jennifer Beals | A mentally ill literary agent's condition turns even worse when he believes that he was bitten by a vampire. |
| Night Thirst (Nishi Trishna) | 1989 | India | Parimal Bhattacharya | Prasenjit Chatterjee, Moon Moon Sen, Shekhar Chatterjee | The first Bengali language vampire film. |
| Magic Cop (驅魔警察) | 1990 | Hong Kong | Stephen Tung | Lam Ching-ying, Wilson Lam, Michael Miu | |
| Rockula | 1990 | United States | Luca Bercovici | Dean Cameron, Toni Basil, Thomas Dolby | |
| Def by Temptation | 1990 | United States | James Bond III | James Bond III, Kadeem Hardison, Bill Nunn | |
| Red Blooded American Girl | 1990 | Canada | David Blyth | Andrew Stevens, Heather Thomas, Christopher Plummer,Kim Coates | A young woman is transformed into a vampire by a virus. The vampire doctor who's treating her hires a young scientist to find a cure. |
| Blood Ties | 1991 | United States | Jim McBride | Harley Venton, Patrick Bauchau, Jason London, Michelle Johnson | A made-for-TV film about a modern vampire family who hail from Carpathia and try to assimilate into American life in Long Beach, California. |
| My Soul Is Slashed (咬みつきたい) | 1991 | Japan | Shūsuke Kaneko | Ken Ogata, Narumi Yasuda, Hikari Ishida | A Japanese man killed by the pharmaceutical company that he works for is accidentally given some of Count Dracula's blood and returns as a vampire to avenge his own murder. |
| Subspecies Subspecies Bloodstone: Subspecies II Bloodlust: Subspecies III Vampire Journals Subspecies 4: Bloodstorm Subspecies V: Blood Rise | 1991; 1993; 1994; 1997; 1998; 2023 | United States; United States; United States; United States; United States; Romania/United States | Ted Nicolaou; Ted Nicolaou; Ted Nicolaou; Ted Nicolaou; Ted Nicolaou; Ted Nicolaou | Angus Scrimm, Anders Hove, Irina Movila; Anders Hove, Denice Duff, Kevin Spirtas; Anders Hove, Denice Duff, Kevin Spirtas; Jonathon Morris, David Gunn, Kirsten Cerre; Anders Hove, Denice Duff, Jonathon Morris; Anders Hove, Denice Duff, Kevin Spirtas | A direct-to-video horror film produced by Full Moon Studios. First sequel. Second sequel. Spinoff. Third sequel. Prequel. |
| Children of the Night | 1991 | United States | Tony Randel | Karen Black, Ami Dolenz, Peter DeLuise | A young woman and a local schoolteacher attempt to rid their small community of vampires that have been inadvertently unleashed. |
| Sleepwalkers | 1992 | United States | Mick Garris | Brian Krause, Mädchen Amick, Alice Krige | Written by Stephen King. |
| Bloodlust | 1992 | Australia | Jon Hewitt, Richard Wolstencroft | Jane Stuart Wallace, Kelly Chapman, Robert James O'Neill | |
| Buffy the Vampire Slayer | 1992 | United States | Fran Rubel Kuzui | Kristy Swanson, Donald Sutherland, Paul Reubens, Rutger Hauer | A Valley girl cheerleader named Buffy Summers learns that it is her fate to hunt and kill vampires. Precursor to the TV series of the same name. |
| Innocent Blood | 1992 | United States | John Landis | Anne Parillaud, Robert Loggia, Anthony LaPaglia, Don Rickles | A beautiful French vampire finds herself pitted against a gang of vicious mobsters who have turned into vampires themselves thanks to her. |
| Samurai Vampire Bikers From Hell | 1992 | United States | Scott Shaw | Scott Shaw, Kenneth H. Kim, Roger Ellis | |
| Darkness | 1993 | United States | Leif Jonker | Gary Miller, Randall Aviks, Mike Gisick | |
| Love Bites | 1993 | United States | Malcolm Marmorstein | Adam Ant, Kimberly Foster, Roger Rose | |
| Cronos | 1993 | Mexico | Guillermo del Toro | Federico Luppi, Ron Perlman, Claudio Brook | Features a vampiric parasite encased inside a clockwork beetle, cunningly devised by a medieval alchemist to pierce the skin of those who handle it, turning them into vampires. |
| The Vampire Chronicles Interview with the Vampire Queen of the Damned | 1994; 2002 | United States; United States | Neil Jordan; Michael Rymer | Tom Cruise, Brad Pitt, Christian Slater; Stuart Townsend, Aaliyah, Marguerite Moreau | Based on the novel of the same name by Anne Rice. Sequel based on the novel of the same name by Anne Rice. |
| Embrace of the Vampire Embrace of the Vampire Embrace of the Vampire | 1995; 2013 | United States; Canada | Anne Goursaud; Carl Bessai | Alyssa Milano, Martin Kemp, Harold Pruett; Sharon Hinnendael, Victor Webster, Kaniehtiio Horn | Original version. Direct-to-video remake. |
| Blood and Donuts | 1995 | Canada | Holly Dale | Gordon Currie, Justin Louis, Helene Clarkson | |
| The Addiction | 1995 | United States | Abel Ferrara | Lili Taylor, Christopher Walken, Annabella Sciorra | A philosophical and theological variant on the vampire film that uses vampirism as a metaphor for drug addiction and which culminates in an extremely violent orgy of bloodsucking. |
| Vampire in Brooklyn | 1995 | United States | Wes Craven | Eddie Murphy, Angela Bassett, Allen Payne | A horror/comedy film. |
| From Dusk Till Dawn From Dusk Till Dawn From Dusk Till Dawn 2: Texas Blood Money From Dusk Till Dawn 3: The Hangman's Daughter | 1996; 1999; 2000 | United States; United States; United States | Robert Rodriguez; Scott Spiegel; P. J. Pesce | Harvey Keitel, George Clooney, Quentin Tarantino; Robert Patrick, Bo Hopkins, Duane Whitaker; Marco Leonardi, Michael Parks, Rebecca Gayheart | A horror/comedy/action-adventure film. First sequel. Second sequel. |
| Night Hunter | 1996 | United States | Rick Jacobson | Don Wilson, Melanie Smith, Nicholas Guest | After killing vampires in an L.A. restaurant, the last in a long line of vampire hunters is chased by both the police and other vampires. |
| Tales from the Crypt Presents: Bordello of Blood | 1996 | United States | Gilbert Adler | Dennis Miller, Erika Eleniak, Angie Everhart | |
| American Vampire | 1997 | United States | Luis Esteban | Trevor Lissauer, Adam West, Sidney Lassick, Carmen Electra | |
| The Night Flier | 1997 | United States | Mark Pavia | Miguel Ferrer, Julie Entwisle, Dan Monahan | Based on the short story of the same name by Stephen King. |
| The Two Orphan Vampires (Les deux orphelines vampires) | 1997 | France | Jean Rollin | Alexandra Pic, Isabelle Teboul, Bernard Charnacé | An adaptation of Rollin's novel of the same name. |
| Blade Blade Blade II Blade: Trinity Deadpool & Wolverine | 1998; 2002; 2004; 2024 | United States; United States; United States; United States | Stephen Norrington; Guillermo del Toro; David S. Goyer; Shawn Levy | Wesley Snipes, Stephen Dorff, Kris Kristofferson; Wesley Snipes, Kris Kristofferson, Ron Perlman; Wesley Snipes, Kris Kristofferson, Jessica Biel; Ryan Reynolds, Hugh Jackman | Based on the Marvel Comics character, Blade. First sequel. Second sequel. Wesley Snipes returns to play Blade |
| Razor Blade Smile | 1998 | United Kingdom | Jake West | Eileen Daly, Christopher Adamson, Heidi James | A very low budget independent film which pays homage to the Hammer lesbian vampire films of the 1970s. |
| Vampires Vampires Vampires: Los Muertos Vampires: The Turning | 1998; 2002; 2005 | United States; United States; United States | John Carpenter; Tommy Lee Wallace; Marty Weiss | James Woods, Daniel Baldwin, Sheryl Lee; Jon Bon Jovi, Cristián de la Fuente, Natasha Gregson Wagner; Colin Egglesfield, Stephanie Chao, Roger Yuan | Also known as John Carpenter's Vampires; First sequel. Second sequel. |
| The Wisdom of Crocodiles | 1998 | United Kingdom | Po-Chih Leong | Jude Law, Elina Löwensohn, Timothy Spall | Based on the book of the same name by Paul Hoffman |
| Blood: The Last Vampire Blood: The Last Vampire Blood: The Last Vampire | 2000; 2009 | Japan; Hong Kong/France/Argentina | Hiroyuki Kitakubo; Chris Nahon | Youki Kudoh, Saemi Nakamura, Joe Romersa; Jun Ji-hyun, Allison Miller, Masiela Lusha | An anime film about a vampire girl named Saya. A live-action adaptation. |
| Coming Out (커밍 아웃) | 2000 | South Korea | Kim Jee-woon | Gu Hye-ju, Shin Ha-kyun, Jang I-ji | A short vampire film. |
| Mom's Got a Date With a Vampire | 2000 | United States | Steve Boyum | Matt O'Leary, Laura Vandervoort, Myles Jeffrey, Caroline Rhea | A Disney Channel original movie. |
| The Little Vampire The Little Vampire The Little Vampire 3D | 2000; 2017 | Germany/Netherlands/United States | Uli EdelRichard Claus, Karsten Kiilerich | Jonathan Lipnicki, Richard E. Grant, Jim CarterRasmus Hardiker, Amy Saville, Jim Carter | Based on the children's book series "Der kleine Vampir" by Angela Sommer-Bodenburg.CG Animation Remake |
| The Forsaken | 2001 | United States | J. S. Cardone | Kerr Smith, Brendan Fehr, Izabella Miko | |
| Trouble Every Day | 2001 | France/Germany/Japan | Claire Denis | Vincent Gallo, Tricia Vessey, Béatrice Dalle | An artistic, erotic take on the vampire myth. |
| Jesus Christ Vampire Hunter | 2001 | Canada | Lee Demarbre | Phil Caracas, Murielle Varhelyi, Jeff Moffet | A cult classic in which Jesus Christ returns to Earth to fight vampires who are killing lesbians. |
| Vampire Clan | 2002 | United States | John Webb | Drew Fuller, Alexandra Breckenridge, Timothy Lee DePriest | Based on the 1996 Vampire Killings in Florida, the film follows the police investigation of five Goth teenagers who claimed to be real-life vampires. |
| Bloody Mallory | 2002 | France/Spain | Julien Magnat | Olivia Bonamy, Adrià Collado, Jeffrey Ribier | |
| The Era of Vampires (千年殭屍王) | 2002 | Hong Kong | Tsui Hark | Danny Chan, Michael Chow, Ken Chang | An edited version of the film was released in North America under the title Tsui Hark's Vampire Hunters. |
| Scooby-Doo! and the Legend of the Vampire | 2003 | United States | Scott Jeralds | Frank Welker, Casey Kasem, Nicole Jaffe | A direct-to-video animated adventure film. |
| The Twins Effect (千機變) | 2003 | Hong Kong | Dante Lam, Donnie Yen | Charlene Choi, Gillian Chung, Ekin Cheng | A martial arts/vampire film with a special guest appearance by Jackie Chan; released in the U.S. as Vampire Effect. |
| Moon Child | 2003 | Japan | Takahisa Zeze | Gackt, Hyde, Leehom Wang | A horror/science fantasy/action-adventure film. |
| Strange Things Happen at Sundown | 2003 | United States | Marc Fratto | J. Scott Green, Masha Sapron, Jocasta Bryan | The film's plot centers on the lives of a handful of New York vampires, interwoven together, and clashing in a violent finale. |
| Underworld Underworld Underworld: Evolution Underworld: Rise of the Lycans Underworld: Endless War Underworld: Awakening Underworld: Blood Wars | 2003; 2006; 2009; 2011; 2012; 2016 | United Kingdom/United States; United States; United States; United States; United States; United States | Len Wiseman; Len Wiseman; Patrick Tatopoulos; Juno John Lee; Måns Mårlind, Björn Stein; Anna Foerster | Kate Beckinsale, Scott Speedman, Michael Sheen; Kate Beckinsale, Scott Speedman, Tony Curran; Kate Beckinsale, Michael Sheen, Bill Nighy; Laura Harris, Trevor Devall, Brian Dobson; Kate Beckinsale, Stephen Rea, Michael Ealy; Kate Beckinsale, Theo James, Lara Pulver | Ongoing war between vampires and lycans (i.e., werewolves). First sequel. Second sequel. Short animated anthology film. Third sequel. Fourth sequel. |
| Vampire Blvd. | 2004 | United States | Scott Shaw | Scott Shaw, Kevin Thompson, Joe Estevez | |
| Night Watch Night Watch (Ночной Дозор) Day Watch (Дневной Дозор) | 2004 2006 | Russia; Russia | Timur Bekmambetov; Timur Bekmambetov | Konstantin Khabensky, Vladimir Menshov, Valeri Zolotukhi; Konstantin Khabensky, Aleksei Chadov, Gosha Kutsenko | A fantasy film partially involving vampires. Sequel. |
| Bloodsuckers | 2005 | Canada | Matthew Hastings | Joe Lando, Dominic Zamprogna, Natassia Malthe | |
| BloodRayne BloodRayne BloodRayne 2: Deliverance BloodRayne: The Third Reich | 2005; 2007; 2011 | Germany/United States; Canada/Germany; United States/Canada/Germany | Uwe Boll; Uwe Boll; Uwe Boll | Kristanna Loken, Michael Madsen, Matthew Davis; Natassia Malthe, Zack Ward, Chris Coppola; Natassia Malthe, Michael Paré, Willam Belli | Based on the video game of the same name. First sequel. Second sequel. |
| Frostbite | 2006 | Sweden | Anders Banke | Petra Nielsen, Grete Havnesköld, Jonas Karlström | Sweden's first vampire film. |
| Vampire Cop Ricky (흡혈 형사 나도열) | 2006 | South Korea | Lee Si-myung | Kim Soo-ro, Jo Yeo-jeong, Chun Ho-jin | |
| Ultraviolet | 2006 | United States | Kurt Wimmer | Milla Jovovich, Cameron Bright, Nick Chinlund | About a woman infected with hemoglophagia, a fictional vampire-like disease, in a future dystopia where anyone infected with the contagious disease is immediately sentenced to death. |
| Perfect Creature | 2006 | New Zealand | Glenn Standring | Dougray Scott, Saffron Burrows, Leo Gregory | New Zealand's first vampire film. |
| Stay Alive | 2006 | United States | William Brent Bell | Jon Foster, Samaire Armstrong, Frankie Muniz | A supernatural slasher film. |
| Slayer | 2006 | United States | Kevin VanHook | Casper Van Dien, Jennifer O'Dell, Tony Plana | A TV film involving an elite commando squad dealing with a deadly and bloodthirsty vampire clan living in the South American rain forest. |
| The Thirst | 2006 | United States | Jeremy Kasten | Matt Keeslar, Clare Kramer, Jeremy Sisto | Recovering drug addicts are persuaded by a vampire clan leader to give up their humanity and join them as vampires. |
| The Hamiltons The Hamiltons The Thompsons | 2006; 2012 | United States; United States | The Butcher Brothers; The Butcher Brothers | Cory Knauf, Samuel Child, Joseph McKelheer; Cory Knauf, Samuel Child, Joseph McKelheer | About a vampire family known as the Hamiltons. Sequel in which the Hamiltons (alias Thompsons) head to England. |
| The Witches Hammer | 2006 | United Kingdom | James Eaves | George Anton, Stephanie Beacham, Claudia Coulter | On the day of her death, a normal woman is transformed into a genetically engineered vampire and trained to kill. She is sent on a mission to stop the Souls of the Damned from being unleashed into our dimension. |
| The Insatiable | 2007 | United States | Chuck Konzelman, Cary Solomon | Sean Patrick Flanery, Charlotte Ayanna, Michael Biehn | A drab, run-of-the-mill guy witnesses a female vampire drink the blood of a bum and becomes so infatuated with her, he tracks her down and traps her in a basement so that she cannot kill again. |
| Rise: Blood Hunter | 2007 | United States | Sebastian Gutierrez | Lucy Liu, Michael Chiklis, Carla Gugino | A reporter wakes up in a morgue to discover that she is now a vampire. |
| 30 Days of Night 30 Days of Night 30 Days of Night: Dark Days | 2007; 2010 | United States; United States | David Slade; Ben Ketai | Josh Hartnett, Melissa George, Danny Huston; Kiele Sanchez, Rhys Coiro, Diora Baird | Based on the comic book of the same name. Sequel. |
| Let the Right One In Let the Right One In (Låt den rätte komma in) Let Me In | 2008; 2010 | Sweden; United States | Tomas Alfredson; Matt Reeves | Kåre Hedebrant, Lina Leandersson, Per Ragnar; Kodi Smit-McPhee, Chloë Grace Moretz, Elias Koteas | Acclaimed horror-romance based on the novel of the same name. An American remake of Let the Right One In. |
| The Vampires of Bloody Island | 2008 | United Kingdom | Allin Kempthorne | Allin Kempthorne, Pamela Kempthorne, Leon Hamiliton | In her castle on an isolated Cornish island, a vampire noblewoman and her zombie henchman work with an alchemist to discover a cure that will grant vampires immunity to sunlight. |
| Not Like Others (Vampyrer) | 2008 | Sweden | Peter Pontikis | Jenny Lampa, Ruth Vega Fernandez, David Dencik | A Swedish horror/drama film about two vampire sisters. |
| I Sell the Dead | 2008 | United States | Glenn McQuaid | Dominic Monaghan, Larry Fessenden, Angus Scrimm | Victorian grave robbers wake the undead. |
| The Twilight Saga Twilight The Twilight Saga: New Moon The Twilight Saga: Eclipse The Twilight Saga: Breaking Dawn – Part 1 The Twilight Saga: Breaking Dawn – Part 2 | 2008; 2009; 2010; 2011; 2012 | United States; United States; United States; United States; United States | Catherine Hardwicke; Chris Weitz; David Slade; Bill Condon; Bill Condon | Kristen Stewart, Robert Pattinson, Billy Burke; Kristen Stewart, Robert Pattinson, Taylor Lautner; Kristen Stewart, Robert Pattinson; Kristen Stewart, Robert Pattinson; Kristen Stewart, Robert Pattinson | Based on the novel of the same name. Based on the novel New Moon. Based on the novel Eclipse. Based on the first half of the novel Breaking Dawn. Based on the second half of the novel Breaking Dawn. |
| Against the Dark | 2009 | United States | Richard Crudo | Steven Seagal, Tanoai Reed, Jenna Harrison | An epidemic disease has overwhelmed humanity, turning nearly everyone into infected bloodthirsty creatures who resemble vampires and zombies. |
| Blood (ブラッド) | 2009 | Japan | Ten Shimoyama | Aya Sugimoto, Guts Ishimatsu, Jun Kaname | A supernatural action-adventure film. |
| Thirst (박쥐) | 2009 | South Korea | Park Chan-wook | Song Kang-ho, Kim Ok-vin, Kim Hae-sook | Loosely based on the novel Thérèse Raquin by Émile Zola. |
| Strigoi | 2009 | United Kingdom | Faye Jackson | Cătălin Paraschiv, Constantin Bărbulescu, Adrian Donea | |
| Daybreakers | 2009 | Australia/United States | The Spierig Brothers | Ethan Hawke, Willem Dafoe, Claudia Karvan | In a futuristic world that has been overrun by vampires, a vampiric corporation sets out to capture and farm the remaining humans while at the same time doing research on making a substitute for human blood. |
| Cirque Du Freak: The Vampire's Assistant | 2009 | United States | Paul Weitz | John C. Reilly, Ken Watanabe, Josh Hutcherson | Based on the popular Cirque du Freak series of books by Darren Shan. |
| The Bleeding | 2009 | United States | Charlie Picemi | Michael Matthias, Vinnie Jones, DMX | |
| Transylmania | 2009 | United States | David Hillenbrand, Scott Hillenbrand | Patrick Cavanaugh, James DeBello, Tony Denman | A horror/comedy film in which a group of college kids do a semester abroad in Romania and realize that if the partying does not kill them, then the vampires just might. |
| Higanjima: Escape from Vampire Island | 2010 | Japan | Kim Tae-kyun | Hideo Ishiguro, Dai Watanabe, Miori Takimoto | A teenage boy seeks his missing brother on an island crawling with vampires. |
| Vampires Suck | 2010 | United States | Jason Friedberg, Aaron Seltzer | Jenn Proske, Matt Lanter, Christopher N. Riggi | A parody of the films Twilight and The Twilight Saga: New Moon. |
| Suck | 2010 | Canada | Rob Stefaniuk | Rob Stefaniuk, Jessica Paré, Malcolm McDowell | A horror-comedy film centered on a rock 'n' roll band that will do anything to become famous. |
| Stake Land Stake Land Stake Land II | 2010; 2016 | United States; United States | Jim Mickle; Dan Berk, Robert Olsen | Nick Damici, Connor Paolo, Michael Cerveris; Nick Damici, Connor Paolo, Laura Abramsen | An orphaned young man is taken under the wing of a vampire hunter. Sequel. |
| My Babysitter's a Vampire | 2010 | Canada | Bruce McDonald | Matthew Knight, Vanessa Morgan, Atticus Mitchell | A Teletoon Channel movie. Followed by a TV series. |
| We Are the Night (Wir sind die Nacht) | 2010 | Germany | Dennis Gansel | Karoline Herfurth, Nina Hoss, Jennifer Ulrich | A modern-day film about a clique of young, rich and pretty female vampires. |
| Midnight Son | 2011 | United States | Scott Leberecht | Zak Kilberg, Maya Parish, Larry Cedar | A young man is confined to a life of isolation due to a very rare skin disorder. |
| Priest | 2011 | United States | Scott Stewart | Paul Bettany, Karl Urban, Lily Collins | Based on the South Korean comic of the same name. |
| Vamp U | 2011 | United States | Matt Jespersen, Maclain Nelson | Julie Gonzalo, Adam Johnson, Maclain Nelson, Gary Cole, Matt Mattson | A vampire and history teacher in a university can’t get his teeth to pop until he meets a student that looks just like his lost love. |
| Monster Brawl | 2011 | Canada | Jesse Thomas Cook | Dave Foley, Art Hindle, Robert Maillet | |
| Dylan Dog: Dead of Night | 2011 | United States | Kevin Munroe | Brandon Routh, Sam Huntington, Anita Briem, Peter Stormare, Taye Diggs | Based on Tiziano Sclavi's Italian comic book Dylan Dog. |
| Vamperifica | 2011 | USA | Bruce Ornstein | Martin Yurkovic, Dreama Walker, Creighton James | A flamboyant loser becomes the vampire king. |
| The Moth Diaries | 2011 | Canada/Ireland | Mary Harron | Lily Cole, Sarah Gadon, Sarah Bolger | Based on the 2002 novel of the same name by Rachel Klein |
| Red Tears (レッド・ティアーズ～紅涙) | 2011 | Japan | Takanori Tsujimoto | Natsuki Kato, Yuma Ishigaki, Yasuaki Kurata | Two detectives hunt down a serial killer. |
| Vampire Dog | 2012 | Canada | Geoff Anderson | Collin MacKechnie, Julia Sarah Stone, Amy Matysio | A boy unwittingly adopts a 600-year-old talking vampire dog and soon discovers that when they face their fears, they can do anything. |
| Kali the Little Vampire (Kali, le petit vampire) | 2012 | France/Portugal/Canada/Switzerland | Regina Pessoa | Christopher Plummer | An animated short film about a boy who is not like the others and dreams about finding his place in the world. |
| Abraham Lincoln: Vampire Hunter | 2012 | United States | Timur Bekmambetov | Benjamin Walker, Dominic Cooper, Anthony Mackie | Based on the 2010 mashup novel of the same name. |
| Byzantium | 2012 | Ireland/United Kingdom/United States | Neil Jordan | Saoirse Ronan, Gemma Arterton, Sam Riley | A mother and daughter vampire duo move into a rundown hotel while hiding out from other vampires. |
| The ABCs of Death | 2012 | United States | Various directors | Various actors | |
| Rufus | 2012 | Canada | Dave Schultz | Rory J. Saper, Kim Coates, David James Elliott | A mysterious young man who turns up in a small town in Saskatchewan is eventually revealed to be a vampire. |
| Vamps | 2012 | United States | Amy Heckerling | Alicia Silverstone, Krysten Ritter, Sigourney Weaver | About two socialite vampires living the good life in New York City. |
| Kiss of the Damned | 2012 | United States | Xan Cassavetes | Joséphine de La Baume, Milo Ventimiglia, Roxane Mesquida | A screenwriter staying in Connecticut to write a screenplay meets and falls in love with a woman, only to discover that she is a vampire who survives by drinking the blood of animals. |
| Vampire Sisters Vampire Sisters (Die Vampirschwestern) Vampire Sisters 2: Bats in the Belly (Vampirschwestern 2: Fledermäuse im Bauch) Vampire Sisters 3: Journey to Transylvania (Vampirschwestern 3: Reise nach Transsilvanien) | 2012; 2014; 2016 | Germany | Wolfgang Groos, Tim Trachte | Marta Martin, Laura Roge, Christiane Paul, Stipe Erceg, Michael Kessler, Richy Müller, Jamie Bick | Based on the eponymous novel series by Franziska Gehm. Two half-vampire sisters who have to adapt to the human world after their family decides to emigrate to Germany. |
| The Brides of Sodom | 2013 | United States | Creep Creepersin | Domiziano Arcangell, David Taylor, Rachel Zeskind | Vampires use humans as cattle in a post-apocalyptic world |
| Only Lovers Left Alive | 2013 | United Kingdom/Germany | Jim Jarmusch | Tilda Swinton, Tom Hiddleston, Mia Wasikowska | A romance between two vampires. |
| Afflicted | 2013 | Canada | Derek Lee, Clif Prowse | Derek Lee, Clif Prowse | Found footage horror movie. Two friends’ tour of Europe takes a dark turn when one of them contracts a mysterious illness. |
| Black Water Vampire | 2014 | United States | Evan Tramel | Bill Oberst Jr., Danielle Lozeau, Andrea Monier | A documentary film crew investigates a series of brutal killings known as the Black Water Murders. |
| Vampire Academy | 2014 | United States/United Kingdom | Mark Waters | Zoey Deutch, Lucy Fry, Danila Kozlovsky | Based on the series of novels of the same name by Richelle Mead |
| What We Do in the Shadows | 2014 | New Zealand | Jemaine Clement, Taika Waititi | Taika Waititi, Jemaine Clement, Rhys Darby | A horror/comedy/"mockumentary" film about a group of vampires who are sharing a flat in Wellington. |
| A Girl Walks Home Alone at Night | 2014 | United States | Ana Lily Amirpour | Sheila Vand, Arash Marandi, Mozhan Marnò | The first Iranian vampire/Western film. |
| Bloodsucking Bastards | 2015 | United States | Brian James O'Connell | Fran Kranz, Joey Kern, Emma Fitzpatrick, Pedro Pascal | A down on his luck cubicle worker and his slacker best friend discover that their new boss is a vampire who is turning their co-workers into the undead. |
| Vampire in Love (恋する ヴァンパイア) | 2015 | Japan | Mai Suzuki | Mirei Kiritani, Shōta Totsuka, Natsume Mito | Kiira seems like an ordinary young girl who likes to dress up. What differentiates her from the others is that she is a vampire. |
| Liar, Liar, Vampire | 2015 | United States/Canada | Vince Marcello | Rahart Adams, Brec Bassinger, Tiera Skovbye | A Nickelodeon original movie. |
| Guardians of the Night (Ночные стражи) | 2016 | Russia | Emilis Velyvis | Lyubov Aksyonova, Ivan Yankovsky, Leonid Yarmolnik | |
| The Phantom Hour | 2016 | United States | Brian Patrick Butler | Luke Pensabene, Raye Richards, Connor Riley Sullivan | A vampire's deadly plan for his guests is jeopardized when his dim-witted servant ruins their dinner. |
| Eat Locals | 2017 | United Kingdom | Jason Flemyng | Eve Myles, Mackenzie Crook, Charlie Cox | A group of vampire overlords gather to discuss feeding quotas only to be attacked by special forces soldiers. |
| Curse (Shraap 3D) | 2018 | India | Faisal Saif | Rajpal Yadav, Kavita Radheshyam, Mythriya Gowda | Bollywood's first-ever vampire/horror film. |
| Family Blood | 2018 | United States | Sonny Mallhi | Vinessa Shaw, James Ransone, Colin Ford, Ajiona Alexus, Carson Meyer, France Jean-Baptiste, Eloise Lushina | Ellie, a recovering drug addict, moves to a new city with her two teenage children. Struggling to stay sober, her life changes when she meets Christopher, who is a different kind of addict. |
| Tales from the Hood 2 | 2018 | United States | Rusty Cundieff, Darin Scott | Keith David, Bryan Batt, Alexandria DeBerry | Horror/comedy/anthology film featuring one vampire segment ("Date Night"). |
| Beautiful Vampire (뷰티풀 뱀파이어) | 2018 | South Korea | Jeong Eun-gyeong | Jung Yeon-joo, Song Kang, Park Jun-myun | A 500-year-old vampire chooses to live an ordinary life among human beings, despite having powers such as great speed. |
| Bit | 2019 | United States | Brad Michael Elmore | Nicole Maines, Diana Hopper, James Paxton | A young trans woman falls in with a group of lesbian feminist vampires. |
| Bliss | 2019 | United States | Joe Begos | Dora Madison | An artist develops a taste for blood after taking a hallucinogenic drug to overcome a creative block. |
| Doctor Sleep | 2019 | United States | Mike Flanagan | Ewan McGregor, Rebecca Ferguson, Kyliegh Curran, Cliff Curtis | A cult of vampires who feed on the souls of psychics terrorize a young girl. |
| My Heart Can't Beat Unless You Tell It To | 2020 | United States | Jonathan Cuartas | Patrick Fugit, Ingrid Sophie Schram, Owen Campbell | Two siblings struggle with each other while care for their sickly brother who must feed upon blood and cannot survive sunlight. |
| Vampires vs. the Bronx | 2020 | United States | Oz Rodriguez | Jaden Michael, Gerald W. Jones III, Gregory Diaz IV, Sarah Gadon, Method Man | A group of teenagers are forced to protect their neighborhood in the Bronx when a gathering of vampires invades. |
| Dracula Sir | 2020 | India | Debaloy Bhattacharya | Anirban Bhattacharya, Mimi Chakraborty, Bidipta Chakraborty | Psychological thriller that follows a primary school teacher, called "Dracula Sir", with a protruding pair of canine teeth who eventually becomes a vampire. |
| Jakob's Wife | 2021 | United States | Travis Stevens | Barbara Crampton, Larry Fessenden, CM Punk | Bodies start to pile up when a woman discovers a new sense of power and an appetite to live bigger and bolder than ever before |
| Red Snow | 2021 | United States | Sean Nichols Lynch | Dennice Cisneros, Nico Bellamy, Laura Kennon | A struggling vampire romance novelist must defend herself against real-life vampires during Christmas in Lake Tahoe. |
| Blood Red Sky | 2021 | Germany/United States | Peter Thorwarth | Peri Baumeister, Carl Anton Koch, Alexander Scheer | A woman with a mysterious illness is forced into action when a group of terrorists attempt to hijack a transatlantic overnight flight. |
| Kicking Blood | 2021 | Canada | Blaine Thurier | Alanna Bale, Luke Bilyk | A vampire tries to kick her addiction to blood after falling in love with a human alcoholic. |
| V/H/S/94 | 2021 | United States | Jennifer Reeder, Chloe Okuno, Simon Barrett, Timo Tjahjanto, Ryan Prows, Steven Kotzanski | | Found footage horror anthology film featuring one vampire segment ("Terror"). |
| Night Teeth | 2021 | United States | Adam Randall | Jorge Lendeborg Jr., Debby Ryan, Lucy Fry, Raúl Castillo, Megan Fox, Alfie Allen | A college student moonlighting as a chauffeur picks up two mysterious women for a night of party-hopping across LA. But when he uncovers their bloodthirsty intentions - and their dangerous, shadowy underworld - he must fight to stay alive. |
| Morbius | 2022 | United States | Daniel Espinosa | Jared Leto, Matt Smith, Adria Arjona, Jared Harris, Al Madrigal, Tyrese Gibson | Biochemist Michael Morbius tries to cure himself of a rare blood disease, but he inadvertently infects himself with a form of vampirism instead. |
| Vampir | 2022 | United Kingdom, Serbia, Germany | Branko Tomovic | Branko Tomovic, Gorica Regodic, Joakim Tasic | |
| HollyBlood | 2022 | Spain | Jesús Font | Óscar Casas, Isa Montalbán, Jordi Sánchez, Piero Méndez, Carlos Suárez | |
| Day Shift | 2022 | United States | J.J. Perry | Jamie Foxx, Dave Franco, Snoop Dogg, Meagan Good | A hardworking dad out to provide for his daughter uses a boring pool-cleaning job as a front for his real gig: hunting and killing vampires. |
| The Invitation | 2022 | United States | Jessica M. Thompson | Nathalie Emmanuel, Thomas Doherty, Stephanie Corneliussen | A woman takes a DNA test which reveals her to be related to a newfound family. After being invited to a wedding, she soon fights to survive after learning the truth of her family history as well as their true intentions. |
| Slayers | 2022 | United States | K. Asher Levin | Thomas Jane, Kara Hayward, Jack Donnelly, Lydia Hearst | |
| House of Darkness | 2022 | United States | Neil LaBute | Justin Long, Kate Bosworth, Gia Crovatin, Lucy Walters | A man looking for a good time falls prey to a trio of vampire sisters |
| Billie the Kid | 2022 | United States | Paul Tomborello | Olivia Hsu, Frank Prell, Zion Monroe, Veronica Conran, Beau Hogan | Cowboys vs Vampires. |
| Blood Relatives | 2022 | United States | Noah Segan | Noah Segan, Victoria Moroles | A vampire's loner lifestyle is thrown into disarray when a teenager shows up claiming to be his daughter, and she's got the fangs to prove it. On a road trip across America's blacktops, they decide how to sink their teeth into family life. |
| El Conde | 2023 | Chile | Pablo Larraín | Jaime Vadell, Gloria Münchmeyer, Alfredo Castro, Paula Luchsinger | A satire that portrays Chilean dictator Augusto Pinochet as a 250-year-old vampire seeking death. |
| Humanist Vampire Seeking Consenting Suicidal Person | 2023 | Canada | Ariane Louis-Seize | Sara Montpetit, Félix-Antoine Bénard, Steve Laplante | A teenage vampire who struggles with the morality of killing people for their blood enters a pact with a suicidal boy on the condition that she must spend the night helping him finish the things he still wants to do before he dies. |
| Empire V | 2023 | Russia | Victor Ginzburg | Pavel Tabakov, Taisiya "Taya" Radchenko, Miron Fyodorov | Based on the novel by Victor Pelevin, it is both a fantasy vampire love story and a sardonic satire of Russia's power elite. It was banned in Russia. |
| Slay | 2024 | Canada | Jem Gerrard | Trinity the Tuck, Heidi N Closet, Crystal Methyd, Cara Melle | Four drag queens booked at the wrong venue manage to win over an unfriendly crowd when they become the biker bar's defenders against a vampire attack. |
| Vampire Lake | 2024 | United States | Daniel Zubiate | Dakota Alvarado, Addison Foskey, Addison Hiatt | A girls' weekend at a cabin in the woods becomes complicated when one of the girls wants to visit a nearby lake to summon a vampire. |
| The Vampire Next Door | 2024 | United States | Sean King | Alex Matthews, Jessica Ferguson, Bella Chadwick | Introverted Cameron, is desperately in love with his high school crush Diane. But his romantic pursuit is halted when Victoria, a female vampire moves in next door. Cameron soon discovers he's in the middle of a life-and-death adventure. |
| Unnatural | 2024 | United States | Whit Whitman | Al Snow, John Wells, Darren Lee Cupp | Supernatural western about a gunslinger on a mission from God who must track down vampires as penance for his past sins. |
| Zombies 4: Dawn of the Vampires | 2025 | United States | Paul Hoen | Meg Donnelly, Milo Manheim, Kylee Russell, Chandler Kinney, Malachi Barton, Freya Skye | Disney Channel Original movie. Fourth installment in the Zombies (franchise) film series. |
| Sinners | 2025 | United States | Ryan Coogler | Michael B. Jordan, Hailee Steinfeld, Miles Caton, Jack O'Connell, Wunmi Mosaku | Trying to leave their troubled lives behind, twin brothers return to their hometown to start again, only to discover that an even greater evil is waiting to welcome them back. |
| Resurrection | 2025 | China | Bi Gan | Jackson Yee, Shu Qi, Mark Chao, Li Gengxi, Huang Jue, Chen Yongzhong | |
| The Vampires of New Orleans | 2026 | United States | Andrew Rakich | Courtnee Carter, Andrew Rakich, Mekhai Lee, Benton Guinness | |
| I Love Paris | 2026 | | | | |
| Hood Vampires | 2027 | United States | TBA | TBD | |

== See also ==
- Vampire films
- List of vampire television series
- Vampire literature
- List of fictional vampires
- Bloodsucking Cinema, a documentary film about vampire films
