= The Big Preview =

The Big Preview was a movie venue that aired on New York City television station WOR-TV (Channel 9) beginning in the early 1960s and continuing into the early 1980s. It could be seen on Sundays (for a time, it also aired on Saturdays) starting somewhere between 5 and 6:30 PM and ran an eclectic mix of films. In addition, there was a Monday night edition of The Big Preview that ran from 1967 to 1968 at 9 PM.

Some movies that were shown were:

- A Lovely Way to Die
- Beware! The Blob
- Blacula
- Cat People (1942)
- Count Yorga, Vampire
- Day of the Wolves
- Destry
- Grave of the Vampire
- It Came from Beneath the Sea
- King Kong Escapes
- King Kong vs. Godzilla
- Lisa and the Devil
- Macabre (1958)
- Monster on the Campus
- P.J. (1968)
- Son of Frankenstein
- The Little Shop of Horrors
- The Man Who Haunted Himself
- The Unsuspected
