= Yoko (film) =

2012 German-language film

- Theatrical release poster
- Directed by: Franziska Buch
- Written by: Knister; Gerrit Hermans, Claudia Boysen
- Based on: Yoko by Knister
- Produced by: Corinna Mehner; Danny Krausz
- Starring: Tobias Moretti; Justus von Dohnányi; Jessica Schwarz
- Cinematography: Jan Fehse
- Edited by: Paul Sedlacek; Tobias Haas
- Music by: Mark Anthony Yaeger
- Production companies: Deutsche Columbia Pictures Filmproduktion; blue eyes Fiction; Dor Film; Fido Film AB
- Distributed by: Sony Pictures Releasing GmbH (Germany and Austria); AB Svensk Filmindustri (Sweden)
- Release dates: 16 February 2012 (Germany); 25 January 2013 (Sweden)
- Running time: 102 minutes
- Countries: Germany; Austria; Sweden
- Language: German
- Box office: $5.1 million

Yoko is a 2012 German-language fantasy film directed by Franziska Buch. It is based on the children's book of the same name by Knister. The film was released in Germany on 16 February 2012 and received mixed reviews from critics.

== Cast ==
- Jamie Bick as Pia
- Oskar Wallroth as Yoko
- Jessica Schwarz as Pias Mutter
- Hoang Dang-Vu as Lhapka
- Lilly Reulein as Marcella
- Tobias Moretti as Thor Van Sneider
- Justus von Dohnányi as Prof. Kellerman
- Friedrich Heine as Lucas
- Ken Takemoto as Mönch Lobsang
