= Jane Eyre (2006 TV series) =

2006 television adaptation

- DVD cover
- Genre: Costume drama
- Based on: Jane Eyre by Charlotte Brontë
- Written by: Sandy Welch
- Directed by: Susanna White
- Starring: Ruth Wilson; Toby Stephens; Cosima Littlewood; Georgie Henley; Tara Fitzgerald; Charity Wakefield; Pam Ferris; Claudia Coulter; Christina Cole; Grace MacIntyre
- Theme music composer: Rob Lane
- Countries of origin: United Kingdom; France
- Original languages: English; French
- No. of series: 1
- No. of episodes: 4

Production
- Executive producers: Phillippa Giles; Rebecca Eaton
- Producer: Diederick Santer
- Cinematography: Mike Eley
- Editor: Jason Krasucki
- Running time: 240 minutes
- Production company: WGBH Productions for BBC

Original release
- Network: BBC One
- Release: 24 September – 15 October 2006

Jane Eyre is a 2006 television adaptation of Charlotte Brontë's 1847 novel of the same name. The story, which has been the subject of numerous television and film adaptations, is based on the life of the orphaned title character. This four-part BBC television drama serial adaptation was broadcast in the United Kingdom on BBC One.

The drama is generally considered a successful adaptation, garnering critical acclaim and a number of nominations from various award bodies.

== Plot ==
In this version of Charlotte Brontë's novel, Jane Eyre (Georgie Henley) is raised as a poor relation in the household of her aunt, Mrs. Reed (Tara Fitzgerald). As a young woman (Ruth Wilson), Jane is hired by the housekeeper of Thornfield Hall, Mrs. Fairfax, to be a governess for young Adèle (Cosima Littlewood). The owner of the estate is Mr. Rochester (Toby Stephens), who is courting the beautiful Blanche Ingram (Christina Cole).

=== Episode One ===
After the death of her maternal uncle, the orphaned child Jane Eyre is left to the care of her uncaring and cruel aunt Mrs Reed. In their house at Gateshead Hall, Jane is ill-treated by her three first cousins and aunt alike and never feels at home. After one of many ill-treatments she is accused of being bad blood and in an attempt to get rid of her, Jane is sent to Lowood School by Mrs Reed. Like Gateshead Hall, Lowood School is a cold institution. Jane's only friend at school, Helen Burns, dies and Jane is left alone once again. Resolving to become independent, she takes on the profession of a governess.

At the age of eighteen, she is able to secure a position as governess to a girl at Thornfield Hall. Here Jane learns that her pupil, a French girl named Adele, is the ward of the master of the house, Edward Rochester, who had had her mother, Celine Verans, as his mistress, and that she had left her illegitimate daughter in his care. She is also informed that the master of the house is seldom at home. On one of his journeys back to Thornfield Hall, Jane at last meets Rochester. One night, Jane wakes to strange noises coming from Rochester's room. She follows the noise and realizes that Rochester's room has been set on fire and the master in danger.

=== Episode Two ===
After Jane is able to rescue Rochester just in time, she wonders who set the fire and from whom these strange sounds from the North Tower came. She barely receives an answer from Rochester who instead leaves Thornfield without notice the next morning. On his return to Thornfield, he brings along some acquaintances among whom are the beautiful Blanche Ingram and her mother Lady Ingram.

Rochester receives another unexpected and not wholly welcome guest. Mason, the guest, is severely injured one night. While Rochester fetches a doctor, Jane is left to take care of Mason in the North Tower. Once again strange sounds from the North Tower precede the incident. While looking after Mason, Jane is startled by loud noises from the other side of the door in the North Tower.

=== Episode Three ===
Jane receives a visitor from her troubled past. Bessie informs her of her aunt's illness and the request to see Jane before she dies. Jane asks Mrs. Reed why she always hated her niece. Mrs. Reed replies that it was because her husband had loved Jane more than his own children, even calling out for her on his deathbed. Jane also learns from her aunt that she has an uncle. This uncle asked to take care of Jane when she was still a child. Her aunt misinformed the uncle and told him that Jane died. Unlike her aunt, Jane is able to forgive Mrs. Reed on her aunt's death bed.

Away from Thornfield Hall, Jane realizes with more clarity that Thornfield has indeed become a home for her, something she never had before. However, the rumours of an upcoming marriage between Blanche Ingram and Mr. Rochester disturb her immensely. Is she to leave her beloved Thornfield?

In an attempt to discover Jane's real emotions, Rochester constantly teases Jane so that she finally reveals that she loves not only Thornfield Hall but Rochester as well. As these romantic feelings are shared by Rochester, he proposes to Jane and she accepts with joy.

Two days before the marriage Jane's wedding veil is ruined. Even her seeing a shadow of a tall woman in her rooms is, according to Rochester, "half dream, half reality." At the wedding, however, Jane finally learns of Rochester's wife Bertha (Claudia Coulter) living in the North Tower. Insanity runs in Bertha's family and as a result she was locked up for the safety of herself and others. This information is revealed by Richard Mason, who turns out to be Bertha's brother. Rochester insists that he still loves Jane and offers to live with her "as brother and sister" but Jane leaves Thornfield in the night.

=== Episode Four ===
Jane is left penniless and without any hope. She succumbs and lies down on the moors to die. She is, however, rescued by the clergyman, St John Rivers, who takes her home and nurses her back to health with the help of his two sisters. Jane, however, seems to have lost her memories.

Jane is told by St John that she has inherited some money from her uncle and that they are also related. St John Rivers also informs Jane that he knows about her past, including Thornfield Hall.

Jane cannot come to terms with the marriage proposal from St John Rivers or the prospect of living abroad as missionaries. As she begins to hear Rochester calling her name, Jane immediately knows that she belongs to Thornfield and Rochester. On her return she finds a weakened and blind Rochester and a burnt-down Thornfield. Jane is also told of the circumstances surrounding the fire and Rochester's blindness. He was injured while trying to rescue his wife Bertha, who did not survive. Rochester recognizes Jane upon hearing her voice and is very happy to have her back. The two are married and the entire family — Rochester, Jane, Adele, St. John Rivers' sisters, two children (presumably Rochester and Jane's offspring), and the dog Pilot — gather in the garden to have their portrait painted. Because St. John is away on his mission, he is painted to the side of the portrait.

=== Differences from the novel ===
The screenplay does deviate from the novel. The time devoted to the first third (Lowood School) and the final third (St. John) of the novel are reduced. The middle of the novel is instead developed and a few scenes from the novel are compressed or moved to different times and places in the narrative. The scenes surrounding Jane's flight from Thornfield until regaining her health are treated as a brief flashback sequence, with many pages of text condensed into a passage of a few minutes' length. Additional scenes were created for the screenplay to underscore the passionate natures of Jane and Rochester. One of the more significant plot changes occurs during the gypsy sequence as Rochester hires a gypsy rather than portraying one himself. Rochester also uses a ouija board as a supplement to this game, a scene which was written specifically for the screenplay.

For a full-length summary of Charlotte Brontë's novel, see Jane Eyre plot summary.

== Cast ==
- Ruth Wilson as Jane Eyre
  - Georgie Henley as Young Jane Eyre
- Toby Stephens as Edward Fairfax Rochester
- Lorraine Ashbourne as Mrs. Fairfax
- Pam Ferris as Grace Poole
- Charity Wakefield as Miss Temple
- Ned Irish as George
- Cosima Littlewood as Adele
- Aidan McArdle as John Eshton
- Tara Fitzgerald as Mrs. Reed
- Elsa Mollien as Sophie
- Rebekah Staton as Bessie
- Andrew Buchan as St. John Rivers
- Annabel Scholey as Diana Rivers
- Emma Lowndes as Mary Rivers
- Arthur Cox as Colonel Dent
- Tim Goodman as Sir George Lynn
- Jeanne Golding as Lady Lynn
- Daniel Pirrie as Richard Mason
- Francesca Annis as Lady Ingram
- Christina Cole as Blanche Ingram
- Claudia Coulter as Bertha Antonietta Mason / Mrs. Rochester
- Bethany Gill as Eliza Reed
- Sam Hoare as Lynn Brother
- Cara Horgan as Eliza Reed
- Alisa Arnah as Georgiana Reed
- Hester Odgers as Helen Burns
- Richard McCabe as Mr. Brocklehurst
- Amy Steel as Dent Twin
- Beth Steel as Dent Twin
- Charlotte West-Oram as Mrs. Dent
- Letty Butler as Leah

== Distribution ==
The worldwide premiere outside of the United Kingdom was in Spain. The production appeared on Antena 3 on 1 January 2007 as a four-hour program and had an audience of 2,056,000 or some 17.7% of the viewing audience.

Jane Eyre was shown on Masterpiece Theatre on most PBS stations compressed into two hours each over two nights, on 21 January and 28 January 2007. Jane Eyre was rebroadcast on 30 December 2007 and 6 January 2008. It was the final broadcast of Masterpiece Theatre before WGBH retooled the classic anthology series into Masterpiece.

RTP2 in Portugal premiered the series on 22 September 2008, 10.40 pm. It also aired on RTS 2 (Serbia) and HTV2 (Croatia).

== Critical reception ==
Lucasta Miller states in The Guardian that, "The new BBC version shows that it is [...] possible to make successful drama by telling the story straight. It features an excellent performance from Toby Stephens, who manages to make Rochester simultaneously macho and vulnerable, and also from Ruth Wilson as a quizzical, strong and un-neurotic Jane." Barry Garron in The Hollywood Reporter suggests that, "the new adaptation written by Sandy Welch and directed by Susanna White doesn't add new colors to Bronte's romantic novel. Rather, it brings out all the shades and hues of the original portrait, restoring it to its full glory." Dennis Moore of USA Today, argued that, "The story is splendidly retold [...] From sweeping shots of the English countryside through all seasons to intimate scenes in the recesses of the manor house, this adaptation of Jane Eyre shows off a richness American TV projects rarely attempt. The appeal stretches beyond style. The lean scripting (even at four hours the program can't cover every one of Brontë's plot details), the expeditious pacing and the interaction among the actors are first-class, if not as brilliant as the more ambitious and magnificent Bleak House from last season."

== Awards and nominations ==
Year	Association	Category	Nominee(s)	Result
2007	BAFTA TV Awards	Best Actress on Television	Ruth Wilson	Nominated
2007	BAFTA TV Awards	Best Make-Up and Hair Design	Anne Oldham	Won
2007	BAFTA TV Awards	Best Original Television Music	Rob Lane	Nominated
2007	BAFTA TV Awards	Best Production Design	Greenville Horner	Nominated
2007	Broadcasting Press Guild	Best Actress	Ruth Wilson	Nominated
2007	Broadcasting Press Guild	Best Drama Series	Jane Eyre	Nominated
2007	Primetime Emmy Awards	Outstanding Art Direction for a Miniseries or a Movie	Grenville Horner, Patrick Rolfe, Clare Andrade	Won
2007	Primetime Emmy Awards	Outstanding Casting for a Miniseries or a Movie	Di Carling	Nominated
2007	Primetime Emmy Awards	Outstanding Cinematography for a Miniseries or a Movie	Mike Eley	Nominated
2007	Primetime Emmy Awards	Outstanding Costumes for a Miniseries or a Movie	Andrea Galer, Sally Crees	Won
2007	Primetime Emmy Awards	Outstanding Directing for a Miniseries or a Movie	Susanna White	Nominated
2007	Primetime Emmy Awards	Outstanding Hairstyling for a Miniseries or a Movie	Anne Oldham, Faye De Bremaeker	Won
2007	Primetime Emmy Awards	Outstanding Single Camera Editing for a Miniseries or a Movie	Jason Krasucki	Nominated
2007	Primetime Emmy Awards	Outstanding Sound Mixing for a Miniseries or a Movie	Richard Manton, Stuart Hilliker	Nominated
2007	Primetime Emmy Awards	Outstanding Writing for a Miniseries or a Movie	Sandy Welch	Nominated
2007	Satellite Awards	Best Actor – Miniseries or Television Film	Toby Stephens	Nominated
2007	Satellite Awards	Best Actress – Miniseries or Television Film	Ruth Wilson	Nominated
2007	Satellite Awards	Satellite Award for Best Miniseries or Television Film	Jane Eyre	Nominated
2008	Costume Designers Guild Awards	Outstanding Made for Television Movie or Miniseries	Jane Eyre	Nominated
2008	Golden Globe Awards	Best Actress – Miniseries or Television Film	Ruth Wilson	Nominated
