= Paul Burke (actor) =

American actor (1926–2009)

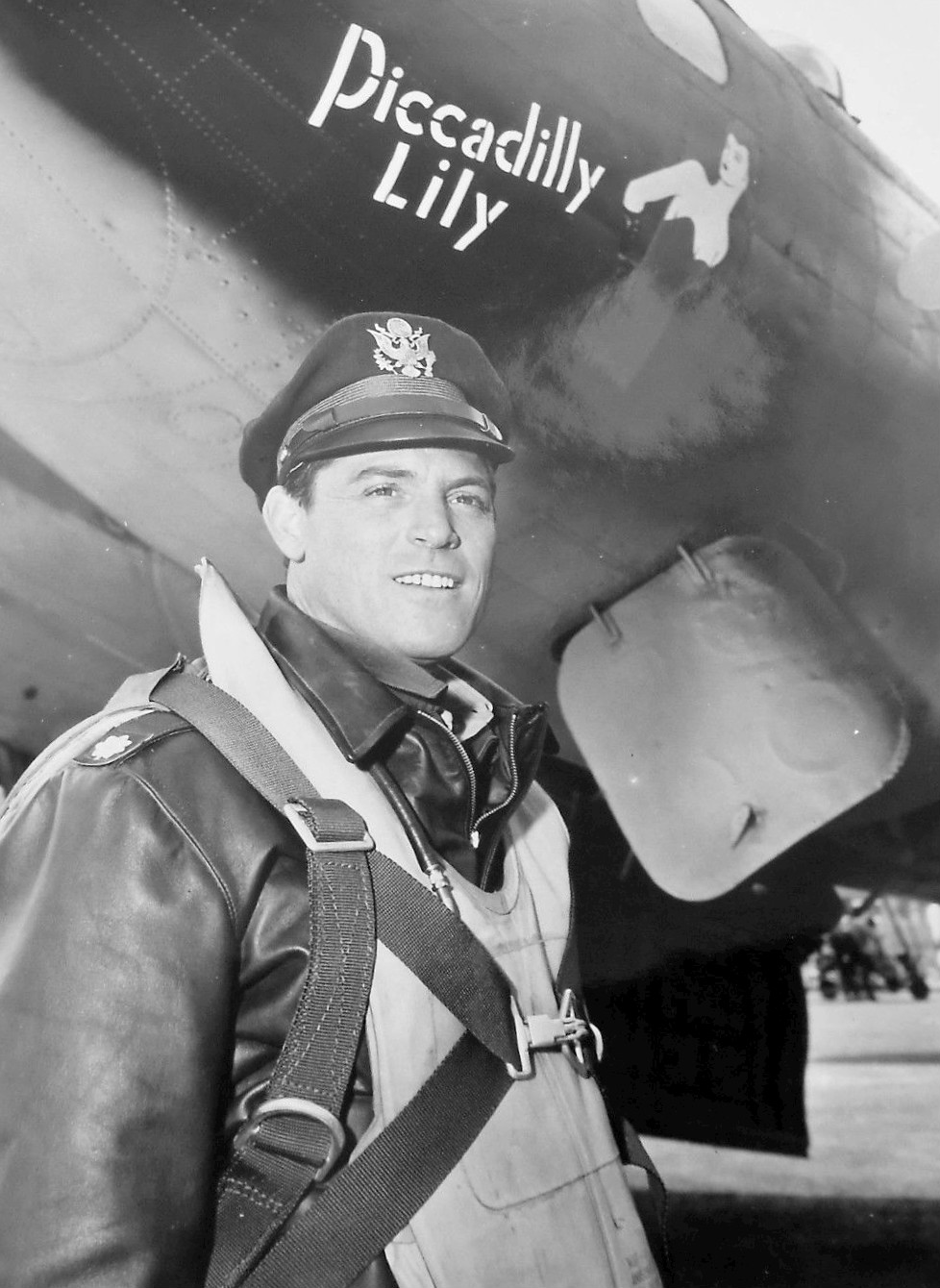
- 1965 photo of Burke as Joe Gallagher in 12 O'Clock High
- Born: Paul Raymond Burke; July 21, 1926; New Orleans, Louisiana, U.S.
- Died: September 13, 2009 (aged 83); Palm Springs, California, U.S.
- Education: Pasadena Playhouse
- Occupation: Actor
- Years active: 1951–1990
- Spouses: Peggy Pryor (m. 1946; div. 1972) Lyn Peters (m. 1979)
- Children: 4
- Relatives: Alia Shawkat (granddaughter)

Paul Raymond Burke (July 21, 1926 – September 13, 2009) was an American actor, best known for his lead roles in two 1960s ABC television series, Naked City and 12 O'Clock High. He was twice nominated for an Emmy Award for his portrayal of New York Police Department detective Adam Flint in Naked City.

== Early life and career ==
Burke was born in New Orleans on 21 July 1946. He was the son of Santa Maria (née Palermo) and Martin Joseph "Marty" Burke, a boxer who twice fought Gene Tunney and later owned a restaurant and nightclub known as Marty Burke's in the New Orleans French Quarter.

After training at the Pasadena Playhouse, Burke's film career began with a small role in the movie Golden Girl. Early in his career, Burke guest-starred in the syndicated series Highway Patrol and Men of Annapolis. In 1956–57, Burke was cast as Dr. Noah McCann in Noah's Ark, a weekly program produced by Jack Webb which aired on NBC, the story of a pair of dedicated veterinarians. Victor Rodman played the older colleague, Dr. Sam Rinehart.

After Five Fingers Burke was cast in the lead role of the police show Naked City, in which he appeared as Adam Flint from 1960 to 1963. Burke then appeared in the starring role of Captain (later Maj., then Col.) Joe Gallagher on 12 O'Clock High between 1964 and 1967, during which time he met his wife, Lyn. The 12 O'Clock High role was Burke's last lead television role.

In 1967, Burke starred in the film Valley of the Dolls as Lyon Burke, the young lawyer who befriended all three female stars and had a tempestuous relationship with Anne Welles. He also played a police officer who pursued a bank robber played by Steve McQueen in The Thomas Crown Affair. He appeared in supporting roles in a number of television series, including recurring roles in Dynasty from 1982 to 1988 and in Tom Selleck's Magnum, P.I., from 1981 to 1985 as Rear Admiral Hawkes. Burke also served as a television commercial spokesman for the electronics retailer RadioShack, and for Buick Division, General Motors Corporation in the early 1970's. At the end of each Buick commercial, Burke would state Buick's then current motto: "Buick, something to believe in."

== Personal life ==
At the age of 19, Paul married Peggy Pryor (born Alice Louise Wilkan; 2 December 1926 – 12 September 1996), also 19 on 8 June 1946. Together they had 3 children :-

- Paula Santa Maria Burke-Lopez (13 April 1948 – 2013)
- Paul Brian Burke (10 April 1950 – 13 May 2024)
- Dina Burke-Shawkat, a film producer and mother of actress Alia Shawkat.

After staying together for roughly 26 years, Paul Burke and Peggy Pryor divorced on 13 March 1972. Later, Paul married Lyn Peters in 1979 and remained married to her till his death. He had a stepson Karl Erik Steiner (12 December 1962 – 5 January 1989) from Lyn's previous marriage / relationship with Lars Erik Steiner (16 October 1920 – 14 March 2004). Karl died from a motorcycle accident in 1989 at a premature age of 26.

== Later years and death ==
Burke is the grandfather of actress Alia Shawkat, whose mother is Burke's daughter, Dina. He retired from acting in the early 1990s. Suffering from leukemia and non-Hodgkin's lymphoma, he died in 2009 at his home in Palm Springs, California, aged 83. His second wife, Lyn Peters, died in Palm Springs on September 10, 2013, at the age of 72.

== Filmography ==
Film
Year	Title	Role	Notes	Ref
1951	Call Me Mister	Soldier	Uncredited	
1951	Golden Girl	Bandit	Uncredited	
1951	Fixed Bayonets!	Doggie	Uncredited	
1952	Francis Goes to West Point	Sergeant Swazey	Uncredited	
1952	Fearless Fagan	Pvt. Hawkins	Uncredited	
1953	South Sea Woman	Ensign at court-martial		
1953	Three Sailors and a Girl	Actor	Uncredited	
1954	Return from the Sea	Gunnery Officer		
1955	Spy Chasers	Michael	Uncredited	
1955	Francis in the Navy	Tate		
1956	Screaming Eagles	Cpl. Dreef		
1957	The Disembodied	Tom Maxwell		
1964	Della	Barney Stafford	Alternative title: Fatal Confinement	
1967	Valley of the Dolls	Lyon Burke		
1968	The Thomas Crown Affair	Lt. Eddy Malone		
1969	Daddy's Gone A-Hunting	Jack Byrnes		
1969	Once You Kiss a Stranger	Jerry Marshall		
1975	Psychic Killer	Lt. Jeff Morgan		
1987	Maharlika	Bob Reynolds	Completed in 1970; International title: Guerilla Strike Force	
Television
Year	Title	Role	Notes	Ref
1955	Big Town	Gardiner	Episode: "The Blood Profiteer"	
1955	Navy Log	Sparks	Episode: "Sky Pilot"	
1955	Highway Patrol	Patrolman Halsey	Episode: "Prison Break"	
1955	Stage 7	Tommy	Episode: "Fox Hunt"	
1955-1956	Adventures of Superman	Moxy	Episode: “Superman Week and The Phantom Ring’’	
1957	Men of Annapolis	Wesley Edmont	Episode: "Seawall"	
1958	Tales of Wells Fargo	Bud Crawford	Episode: "The Killer"	
1959	The Millionaire	Bill Nellis	Episode: "The Karl Miller Story"	
1960	Hawaiian Eye	Brad Finley	Episode: "Second Fiddle"	
1960	Hotel de Paree	Tad Frisbee	Episode: "Sundance and the Long Trek"	
1960	Wanted: Dead or Alive	Daniel Trenner	Episode: "The Trial"	
1960-1963	Naked City	Detective Adam Flint	99 episodes	
1963	The Lieutenant	Captain Kenneth Thomson	Episode: "Captain Thomson"	
1964	The Great Adventure	Captain Richard Pratt	Episode: "The Special Courage of Captain Pratt"	
1964	Combat!	Sgt. O'Neill	Episode: "Point of View"	
1964	Slattery's People	Dr. Robert Harrison	Episode: "Question: What is a Genius Worth This Week?"	
1964-1967	12 O'Clock High	Colonel Joseph Anson Gallagher	48 episodes	
1970	Crowhaven Farm	Ben Porter	Television movie	
1972	The Rookies	Neil Montgomery	Television movie	
1972	Lieutenant Schuster's Wife	Lt. Lou Schuster	Television movie	
1973	Police Story	Anthology series—different character in each episode.	4 episodes—S01E03, S02E05, S03E10, S03E21	
1973	Thriller	Brad Hunter	Episode: “An Echo of Theresa”	
1973	The New Perry Mason	Herbert Newton	Episode: "The Case of the Murdered Murderer"	
1973	Shaft	Elliot Williamson	Episode: "The Kidnapping"	
1974	Hawkins	Fred Hyatt	Episode: "Candidate for Murder"	
1974	Police Woman	Joe Fenner	Episode: "The End Game"	
1974	Harry O	Philip Ballinger	Episode: "Ballinger's Choice"	
1974	Mannix	Penn Anderson	Episode: "The Survivor Who Wasn't"	
1975	McMillan & Wife	Les Walker	Episode: "Night Train to L.A."	
1976	Petrocelli	John Fleming	Episode: "Any Number Can Die"	
1976	Starsky & Hutch	Lt. Ted Cameron	Episodes: "The Las Vegas Strangler" (Parts 1 & 2)	
1977	Little Ladies of the Night	Frank Atkins	Television movie	
1978	Wild and Wooly	Tobias Singleton	Television movie	
1978	What Really Happened to the Class of '65?	McDonald	Episode: "Mr. Potential"	
1978	Fantasy Island	Bill Fredricks	Episode: Lady Of The Evening/The Racer	
1978	The Love Boat	Brian Sherwood	Season 1 Episode 18: The Inspector/A Very Special Girl/Until The Last Goodbye	
1979	Beach Patrol	Wes Dobbs	Television movie	
1979	The Littlest Hobo	Andy McClelland	Episode: "The Defector"	
1980	Charlie's Angels	Clifford Burke	Episode: "Of Ghosts and Angels"	
1980	Trapper John, M.D.	Dr. Malcolm	Episode: "Hot Line"	
1981	Vega$	Curtis Green	Episode: "The Killing"	
1982-1988	Dynasty	Neal McVane	23 episodes	
1983	T. J. Hooker	Capt. Frank Medavoy	Episode: "Blue Murder"	
1984	The Red-Light Sting	Brockelhurst	Television movie	
1984	Santa Barbara	C.C. Capwell	21 episodes	
1985	Finder of Lost Loves	Richard Foster	Episode: "Deadly Silence"	
1985	Murder, She Wrote	Herbert Upton	Episode: "Murder in the Afternoon"	
1986	Hot Shots	Nicholas Broderick	13 episodes	
1988	Cagney & Lacey	Winston Prentiss	Episode: "Yup"	
1990	Columbo	Horace Sherwin	Episode: "Uneasy Lies the Crown" (final appearance)	
