= Blood Ties (1991 film) =

- Promotional poster
- Genre: Horror; Thriller
- Written by: Richard Shapiro
- Directed by: Jim McBride
- Starring: Harley Venton; Patrick Bauchau; Jason London; Michelle Johnson
- Music by: Brad Fiedel
- Country of origin: United States
- Original language: English

Production
- Executive producers: Richard Shapiro; Esther Shapiro
- Producer: Gene Corman
- Cinematography: Affonso Beato
- Editor: Stephen Semel
- Running time: 102 minutes
- Production companies: Richard & Esther Shapiro Productions

Original release
- Network: Fox
- Release: May 27, 1991

Blood Ties is a 1991 American horror thriller television film directed by Jim McBride, written by Richard Shapiro, and starring Harley Venton, Patrick Bauchau, Jason London, and Michelle Johnson. It is a story about a modern vampire family who hail from Carpathia. The family try to assimilate into American life in Long Beach, California, but their lives are upset when a sinister group of hunters kill a member of their extended kin and threaten to come after them. The film aired on the Fox network on May 27, 1991.

== Background ==
It is hinted that the Carpathian families are the people who inspired all the myths about vampires. In the film, they are descended from Lilith (first wife of Adam before Eve) and Asmodeus (King of the Nine Hells) and have inherited healing abilities as well as above average human strength.

They consider the word "vampire" to be a racist term against their kind and have strict rules against breeding with anyone outside their race.

The Carpathian families are divided into a council of Elders, the more timid family members and their vicious young blood who taken on the form of a biker gang called the Shrikes.

== Plot ==
The film opens in Loving County, Texas, where a teenage boy named Cody Puckett awakens one ominous night to find his parents staked and burned by a heretic vampire hunter group called the S.C.A.V., which stands for the Southern Coalition Against Vampirism. After shooting him with a crossbow, the vampire hunters allow Cody to escape, hoping he will lead them back to his extended family.

In Long Beach, California, journalist Harry Martin receives the details of the Texas killings, before heading out to hear the verdict of a court-case he has been covering. Assistant D.A. Amy Lorne is cornered in an elevator by the members of the Shrikes, a biker gang named after the "unpleasant little birds who impale their prey on thorn bushes," one of whom the A.D.A. is currently prosecuting.

Harry appears to break up the incident. The gang leader, "Butcherbird", warns Harry that "Uncle Eli" isn't happy with the articles he's been writing. Harry explains to a confused Amy that he and Butcherbird are "distant cousins". In court, an obviously fixed jury announces that it cannot reach a verdict. Disgusted, Amy storms out, and Harry goes after her. He asks her to attend a "family party" with him before leaving her to join Eli Chelarin, the powerful businessman who fixed Butcherbird's trial.

At Eli's office, Harry warns Eli that "it's starting again", and shows him the newspaper clipping of the Texas killings. Later that week, Cody reaches town and tries to find Eli. Instead he encounters the Shrikes. At Eli's birthday party, Amy is surprised to learn that Harry is connected to so much wealth and power. He reveals that his real name is Harlevon Martinescu, as part of his Carpathian heritage.

The party comes to an abrupt halt when Butcherbird enters with Cody. Harry excuses himself to Amy, joining a council in a private room. There, the male family members hear about the death of Cody's parents. Eli, Harry and the Council tell Cody that his parents were members of their family who decided to move away to Texas before Cody was born. When Cody has left the room, Harry tries to convince the others to leave the killings to the police, that the family "cannot go on in the old ways". Furious, Eli accuses Harry of betraying the family, speaking sneeringly of Amy and provoking him to a violent anger. Meanwhile, a nervous Amy is teased first by Celia, Eli's half-sister, then by Butcherbird.

Harry rescues her and takes her home where, despite his obvious attraction to her, he rejects her advances and leaves. Later that night, Harry receives an unexpected visit from Celia, who seduces him, inviting him to bite her throat as they couple. Meanwhile, Cody is then taken in by Celia and is later tempted to become involved with the Shrikes as they ride out into the night with their clan's girls.

Later the next morning, an argument between Butch and Cody over the pendant which had belonged to Cody's grandmother leads to Butch enlightening Cody about their shared family heritage as vampiric creatures. A shocked Cody refuses to believe it and attacks Butch out of rage leading to a wolf-like fight, much to the excitement of the other Shrikes and their women.

Harry appears to break up the brawl and Cody realizes that during the fight, he had bitten Butch on the neck. He eventually realizes that everything Butch said about their family was true.

Harry later tells Cody about his parents and their family. He also reveals that their family had been at war with the heretic vampire hunters for generations. Cody begins to crave revenge for his family and chooses life with the Shrikes over Harry's pleas for him to choose a more peaceful life. Harry then returns to try to pursue a relationship with Amy, but knows his family does not approve of her as she is not one of them.

Staying in Eli's house, Cody tries to familiarize with the vampire community and how to identify vampires. Zapping different TV channels, he asks Celia whether Donald Trump, appearing in a real TV scene, is a vampire and Celia responds "Maybe".

The vampire hunters soon show up in Long Beach and kidnap Celia to lure the Carpathians into a final showdown. As tradition demands, their battle takes place at the hour of the jackal (3:00 am) on a beach where Eli has a new hotel under construction. At first, the fight goes in the favor of the hunters, but the Shrikes eventually show up to help turn the tide.

When the hunters are defeated, the Council vote to have them killed, even against Harry's pleas to simply turn them over to the Texas authorities for the murder of Cody's parents. When the family attacks and bites the remaining hunters, Cody wishes to join in, but is dissuaded by Harry.

The Shrikes then take the corpses of the hunters and throw them into the sea as Harry and Cody walk off. As they leave, Cody keeps looking back and wondering if his decision to leave with Harry was the right one.

== Cast ==
- Harley Venton as Harry Martin/Harlevon Martinescu
- Patrick Bauchau as Eli Chelarin
- Kim Johnston Ulrich as Amy Lorne
- Michelle Johnson as Celia
- Salvator Xuereb as Butcherbird Vlad
- Jason London as Cody Puckett
- Bo Hopkins as Chief Hunter
