= Claudia Coulter =

British actress and model

Claudia Coulter is an actress, model and voice-over artist of British/Latin descent who has appeared in a number of films and television programmes.

== Education ==
Coulter studied acting at the Academy of Live and Recorded Arts (ALRA).

== Career ==
In 2006, Coulter made appearances in at least two BBC productions, including an episode of Footballers' Wives and Jane Eyre.

In 2006, she also acted in a low-budget vampire film titled The Witches Hammer.

In 2008 and early 2009, Coulter appeared in ITV's Trial and Retribution: Sirens.

== Filmography ==
- Re-Uniting the Rubins (2010)
- Trial & Retribution XX: Siren (2009) (TV)
- Jane Eyre (2006; Episode Three)
- The Witches Hammer (2006)
- Footballers' Wives (2006) (TV)
- Rosemary & Thyme (2006)
- Coma Girl: The State of Grace (2005)
- Headhunter: Redemption (2004) (Video game)
- Almost Strangers (2004)
- Frozen (2003)
