= Vampire Sisters =

- Theatrical release poster
- German: Die Vampirschwestern
- Directed by: Wolfghang Groos
- Written by: Ursula Gruber
- Based on: Die Vampirschwestern by Franziska Gehm
- Produced by: Jakob Claussen; Ulrike Putz
- Starring: Laura Roge; Marta Martin; Christiane Paul; Stipe Erceg; Michael Kessler; Hans-Peter Deppe; Regine Vergeen; Jamie Bick
- Cinematography: Bernhard Jasper
- Edited by: Stefan Essl
- Music by: Helmut Zerlett
- Production companies: Deutsche Columbia Pictures Filmproduktion; Claussen + Wöbke + Putz Filmproduktion
- Distributed by: Sony Pictures Releasing
- Release date: 12 December 2012
- Running time: 97 minutes
- Country: Germany
- Language: German
- Box office: $7.9 million

Vampire Sisters (German: Die Vampirschwestern) is a 2012 German children's film by Wolfgang Groos. The fantasy-comedy film based on the eponymous novel series by Franziska Gehm.

== Plot ==
The two twelve year old half-vampire sisters Silvania and Dakaria Tepes move from Transylvania to a small German town, together with their father Mihai (a vampire) and their mother Elvira (a human). This is a culture shock for the two very dissimilar sisters. While Dakaria does not fit in to the human world, Silvania thrives among humans. In the school they struggle to fit in, although between Jacob and Silvania, a little romance seems to develop. Dakaria, however, has only one friend: the hard of hearing Helene, who hides her disability.

Dirk van Kombast, a neighbor of the family, becomes suspicious of the Tepes family and orders Vampire Hunter equipment over the Internet. Dakaria's flight competition is doomed to fail because she has not enough air force as a half-vampire. Meanwhile, Silvania can't spend time with Jacob at the pool because of her sensitivity to the sun. Both of the sisters want to solve the problems they face as half-vampires, but in different ways. By chance, they discover the shop of Ali bin Schick, who can grant them their hearts' desires. Although he warns them that the wishes are dangerous, the two are sure: Silvania wants to become fully human, while Dakaria wants to become fully vampire. However, their wishes accidentally become swapped during the process.

After they make their wishes, there are numerous complications: Silvania wants to drink Jacob's blood, while Dakaria is unable to defend herself from the school's bullies. Realizing their wishes have been swapped, they desperately look for Ali bin Schick. His grandson, Ludo, coincidentally a classmate of the two, knows the formula for an antidote. To achieve this, they need a flower, picked only at midnight and servers allows a new passion. Along with Helene, that initiate them after a brief interlude in their secret, searching for the flower in the local cemetery. Dirk van Kombast finds them, wishing to hunt them down as vampires. Eventually they fight him off with the help of Ludo, who turns out to be a visionary, and grab the flower. The two have learned from their experience and both return to their half-vampire selves.

== Cast ==
- Marta Martin as Silvania Tepes
- Laura Roge as Dakaria Tepes
- Christiane Paul as Elvira Tepes
- Stipe Erceg as Mihai Tepes
- Michael Kessler as Dirk van Kombast
- Richy Müller as Ali Bin Schick
- Jamie Bick as Elena Steinbrück
- Xaver Wegler as Benny Hartwig
- Hans-Peter Deppe as Grandfather Gustav
- Regine Vergeen as Grandmother Rose
- Ise Strambowski as Sra. Hase
- Viola von der Burg as Master Sra. Renneberg
- Gudrun Gundelach as Master vampire

== Production ==
The film is based on the homonymous novel series by Franziska Gehm and is a production of Claussen + Wöbke + Putz Filmproduktion, in co-production with Deutsche Columbia Pictures Filmproduktion. The film was promoted by the FilmFernsehFonds Bavaria, the Film and Media Foundation North Rhine-Westphalia, the Film Promotion Institute, and the German Film Fund.

== Sequel ==
A sequel, titled Vampire Sisters 2: Bats in the Belly (Die Vampirschwestern 2 - Bats in the belly), was released in October 2014 in German cinemas, but didn't land in Dutch cinemas until July 2016.
