= Lyn Peters =

American actress (1941–2013)

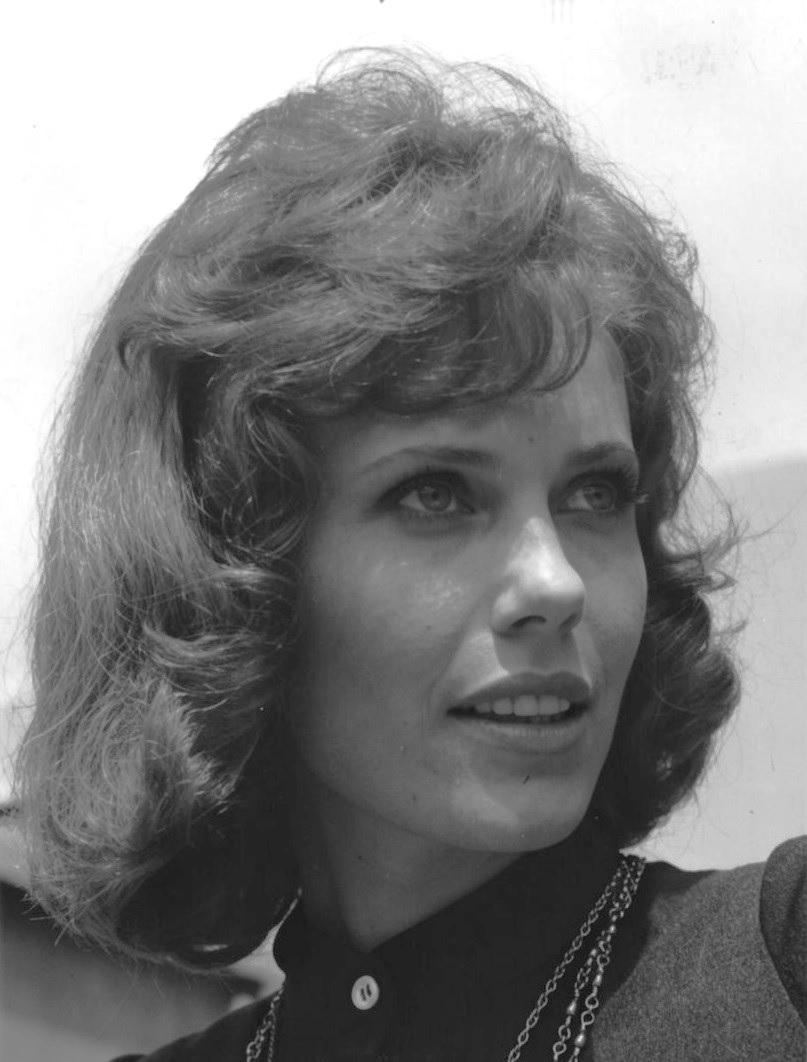
- Peters in The Partners, 1971
- Born: Evelyn Anne Peters; February 28, 1941; Argentina
- Died: September 10, 2013 (aged 72); Palm Springs, California, U.S.
- Occupation: Actress
- Years active: 1966–1972
- Spouse: Paul Burke (m. 1979; died 2009)

Evelyn Anne Peters (February 28, 1941 – September 10, 2013) was an Argentine-born British-American model, actress and caterer. She is best known for her television work during the 1960s and 1970s, including Get Smart, Hogan's Heroes, and Batman. She also appeared in film roles, including In Like Flint in 1967 and Grave of the Vampire, which was released in 1972. Peters was the widow of American actor Paul Burke, who died in 2009.

== Biography ==
Peters was born in Argentina, and raised and educated in London. She worked as a fashion model before moving to Los Angeles, California, to pursue an acting career. She was cast in several notable roles in American television series during the 1960s. In a 1968 Batman three-episode arc from the show's third and last season, Peters portrayed Lady Prudence, daughter of main villain Rudy Vallee as Lord Marmaduke Ffogg, alongside Glynis Johns as Lady Penelope Peasoup, Lord Ffogg's sister, all of whom lived near the fictional English city of Londinium.

She next appeared on the series Get Smart in 1968, in which she played Mrs. Emily Neal, a KAOS agent sent to foil American track and field athletes. According to The Hollywood Reporter, Peters' Neal character was a parody of The Avengers' Emma Peel, played by Diana Rigg. Her other television work during the 1960s and 1970s included roles on It Takes a Thief, Hogan's Heroes, The Rat Patrol, Twelve O'Clock High, Daniel Boone, The Man from U.N.C.L.E. and The Girl from U.N.C.L.E.

She retired from acting during the 1980s. An alumna of Le Cordon Bleu, Peters established and launched Custom Catering, her own catering company. Her clients included Bob Hope and Frank Sinatra, earning her the nickname "caterer to the stars."

== Family ==
She married actor Paul Burke in 1979. He died in 2009. Lyn Peters died at her home in Palm Springs, California, on September 10, 2013, aged 72, from undisclosed causes. She was survived by three stepchildren, Paula, Paul and Dina as well as her step-granddaughter actress Alia Shawkat. Her son Karl died in 1989.

== Partial filmography ==
- In Like Flint (1967) - Technician (uncredited)
- Grave of the Vampire (1972) - Anne Arthur (final film role)
