= The Witches Hammer =

- Film poster
- Directed by: James Eaves
- Written by: James Eaves
- Produced by: Steve Barnes; James Eaves; Laura Tennant
- Starring: Stephanie Beacham; Claudia Coulter
- Cinematography: John Raggett
- Edited by: James Eaves
- Music by: Mark Conrad Chambers
- Production company: Amber Pictures
- Distributed by: WonderPhil Productions; Blackhorse Ent. Epix Media
- Release date: 22 December 2006
- Running time: 91 minutes
- Country: United Kingdom
- Language: English

The Witches Hammer is a 2006 low budget English action/horror film written and directed by James Eaves, produced by British production company Amber Pictures, and starring Stephanie Beacham and Claudia Coulter with George Anton as an antagonistic vampire.

== Plot ==
After Rebecca (Claudia Coulter) is attacked in the streets, she is awakened by agents from "Project 571". She wants to return to her husband and son, but the agents inform her that she cannot because they have "altered" her to be a genetically modified vampire. Coercing her by promising that she might see her family again, they train her into a highly skilled assassin.

Returning from an assignment and discovering that everyone at Project 571 has been slaughtered, Rebecca is rescued by a warlock named Edward (Jonathan Sidgwick) and taken to Madeline (Stephanie Beacham), the witch who heads "Project 572". She is told that they need her expertise to retrieve "The Witches Hammer", a spellbook written by the Russian witch Katanya. The book is required to kill the vampire Hugo Renoir (Tom Dover), whose only vulnerability is one of its spells. As Rebecca and Edward begin their quest, they are set upon by both rival vampires and Hugo's minions, each whom wish the book for themselves.

== Cast ==
- George Anton as Vampire
- Stephanie Beacham as Madeline
- Claudia Coulter as Rebecca
- Tom Dover as Hugo
- Jonathan Sidgwick as Edward
- Tina Barnes as Edward's Wife
- Sam Smith as Masked Man
- Jason Tompkins as Oscar
- Kris Tanaka as Victor's vampire bodyguard - plus the fight scene choreographer.
- Miguel Ruz as Victor Ferdinand
- Magda Rodriguez as Kitanya
- Harold Gasnier as Le Cardinale
- Sally Reeve as Charlotte Apone
- Tom Dover as Hugo Renoir
- Kris Tanaka as a Vampires
- Anthony Hampshire as a hammer
- Neil Little as a Terrified Nightclubber #3

== Release ==
First screened at Cannes on 22 May 2006, the film had its theatrical debut in Japan on 22 December 2006 and its DVD premiere on 7 March 2007 in the UK. The film received a nomination for "Best Feature Film" at the 2008 Swansea Film Festival.

== Reception ==
Don Sumner of Best Horror Movies wrote that one can see the "influences of several other popular movies in the way the film’s story progresses and how the scenes are shot", making note of influences from Blade, where the protagonist is skilled in martial arts and, Underworld where vampires and werewolves have an eternal malice toward each other. He summarized by writing "The story is great and engrossing, the characters are interesting and the acting is very good – especially the ice-queen performance of Stephanie Beacham". Moria Science Fiction, Horror and Fantasy Film Review most enjoyed the way writer/director Eaves crafted a "back mythology" and appreciated that the background of the supporting characters was treated with depth and imagination. Noting that the action scenes felt like they were "boiler-plated in as set-pieces at regular intervals", they felt that they were "convincingly done and come with a stylish, well-choreographed kick". Andrew Mackenzie of Beyond Hollywood wrote that The Witches Hammer "exists only as an example of the terrible things that happen when filmmakers are heavily influenced by Hollywood." Rees Savidis of JoBlo.com rated the film 1.5/4 stars and called it amateurish and muddled. David Johnson of DVD Verdict called it "an achingly abysmal exercise in vampire action-horror".
