= Fernando Méndez =

Argentine footballer (born 1984)

Personal information
- Full name: Fernando Ambrosio Méndez Chiquitelli
- Date of birth: 4 August 1984 (age 42)
- Place of birth: Caleta Olivia, Argentina
- Height: 1.73 m (5 ft 8 in)
- Position: Midfielder

Senior career*
Years	Team	Apps	(Gls)
2004	Quilmes		
2004–2005	Atlético Rafaela		
2005–2006	Almagro		
2006	Ben Hur		
2007	Sportivo Belgrano		
2008	Douglas Haig		
2008–2009	9 de Julio		
2009–2011	Boca Río Gallegos		
2010	→ Antofagasta (loan)		
2011	→ Cobreloa (loan)		
2012	San Marcos de Arica		
2013	Naval		
2013–2014	C.A.I		
2014	Jorge Newbery CR		
2015	Cuautla		
2015–2016	San José		
2016–2017	Juventud Antoniana		
- * Club domestic league appearances and goals

Fernando Ambrosio Méndez Chiquelli (born 4 August 1984) was an Argentine professional footballer who played as a midfielder.

== Honours ==
San Marcos de Arica

- Primera B: 2012
