= Harley Venton =

Canadian actor

Harley Venton is an American retired television, film, and Broadway actor.

== Career ==
=== Film and television ===
After graduating from the University of North Dakota and the University of Minnesota, Venton moved to New York City, where he first became known for playing the role of attorney Derek Colby on the long running CBS soap opera, Guiding Light from 1980 to 1982.

In 1983, Venton relocated to California permanently, and shortly thereafter, began making frequent appearances on episodic television programs.

In 1983, ABC expressed interest in Venton for the role of David Addison on the comedy-drama series Moonlighting. Venton screen-tested for the role of Addison in September 1984. Cybill Shepherd wanted Venton to play Addison, but producer Glenn Gordon Caron ultimately gave the role to Bruce Willis.

Venton's audition can be seen as a bonus included in the Moonlighting DVD box collection and on Youtube. He would later appear alongside Shepherd in an episode of her 1990s sitcom, Cybill, playing Dennis Oliver, an actor with whom she attends an Oscars telecast who gets her caught up in a scandal (season 2, Episode 5: "Cybill's Fifteen Minutes").

He has appeared on Kate & Allie, Murphy Brown, Star Trek: The Next Generation, Murder, She Wrote, Models, Inc., The Practice, Seinfeld (Dan in the Season 3 episode "The Limo"), Double Rush, Who's the Boss?, Law & Order (Episode "Thin Ice"), and Ellen (playing the eponymous character in the Season 2 episode "The Dentist"), among other series.

In 1990, Venton was cast in a starring role in Blood Ties, a 2-hour pilot movie for the then-fledgling Fox Network; although the program was not picked up by the network, it did air the pilot as a made-for-TV movie presentation in 1991.

His film roles include Sleeping with the Enemy (1991), Clear and Present Danger (1994), World Upon Her Shoulder (1998), and Falling Like This (2001).

=== Theatre ===
From 1981 to 1983, while still appearing on Guiding Light, he was also a standby in the original Broadway production of Crimes of the Heart.

He would later have a starring role in the Ambassador Theatre production of The Circle in 1989 and 1990, also starring Glynis Johns, Rex Harrison, and Stewart Granger.

He appeared Off-Broadway in 1991 in Douglas Carter Beane's Advice from a Caterpillar.

== Personal life ==
In 2014, Venton married his current wife, Ann; he resides in Gaithersburg, Maryland.

== Partial filmography ==
| Year | Title | Role | Notes |
|---|---|---|---|
| 1991 | Sleeping with the Enemy | Garber | |
| 1994 | Clear and Present Danger | DEA Agent #1 | |
| 2011 | Falling Like This | Jack Lockhart | |
