= Jamie Bick =

German actress (born 2000)

- Born: 11 January 2000 (age 26); Bergisch Gladbach, Germany
- Occupation: Actress
- Height: 5 ft 7 in (170 cm)

Jamie Bick (born January 11, 2000, Bergisch Gladbach, Germany) is a German actress.

== Life ==
Bick was born on January 11, 2000, in Bergisch Gladbach, Germany. She began her career at the age of 2, appearing in advertising campaigns for Haribo and Toggo. She appeared in three episodes of the TV series Alarm für Cobra 11 – Die Autobahnpolizei. Her film career began with Ob ihr wollt oder nicht (2009); her role was uncredited. Her first starring role was as Pia in Yoko (2012). In 2011, she portrayed Helene Steinbrück in Vampire Sisters. In 2016, she portrayed Anne Frank's childhood friend Hannah Pick-Goslar in Das Tagebuch der Anne Frank.

== Education ==
Bick is taking acting lessons in Cologne, and studies singing in her free time.

== Filmography ==
- 2006: Stolberg (episode: "Vaterliebe"; uncredited)
- 2008–2012: Alarm für Cobra 11 – Die Autobahnpolizei (3 episodes; uncredited)
- 2009: Ob ihr wollt oder nicht (uncredited)
- 2012: Yoko
- 2012: Nothing but Women
- 2012: Off-Line (TV film)
- 2012: Vampire Sisters
- 2013: Quality Time
- 2013: Inga Lindström (episode: "Herz aus Eis")
- 2014: Vampire Sisters 2: Bats in the Belly
- 2014-2017: Cologne P.D. (3 episodes)
- 2015: Cactus and Mimosa (short)
- 2016: Die Truckerin (TV film)
- 2016: SOKO Leipzig (episode: "Bilder im Kopf")
- 2016: Das Tagebuch der Anne Frank
- 2016: Let's talk. Weil Meinung zählt! (episode: "Da muss man was tun!")
- 2016: Vampire Sisters 3: Journey to Transylvania
- 2016: Heavenly Bonds (4 episodes)
- 2017-2019: In aller Freundschaft – Die jungen Ärzte (2 episodes)
- 2017: It's Your Turn, Honey!
- 2017: Loverboy
- 2018: Bettys Diagnose (episode: "Verletzte Gefühle")
- 2018: Tatverdacht: Team Frankfurt ermittelt (episode: "Hilferuf")
- 2019: Dem Horizont so nah
- 2019: Tatort (episode: "Lakritz")
