= Grave of the Vampire =

1972 American horror film by John Hayes

- Theatrical release poster
- Directed by: John Hayes
- Written by: David Chase; John Hayes
- Screenplay by: David Chase
- Based on: The Still Life by David Chase
- Produced by: Daniel Cady
- Starring: William Smith; Michael Pataki; Lyn Peters; Dianne Holden; Jay Adler; Kitty Vallacher; Jay Scott; Lieux Dressler; Inga Neilsen; Lindis Guinness
- Cinematography: Paul Hipp
- Edited by: John Hayes
- Music by: Jaime Mendoza-Nava
- Production company: Millennium Productions
- Distributed by: Entertainment Pyramid
- Release date: September 13, 1972 (Boston)
- Running time: 90 minutes
- Country: United States
- Language: English
- Budget: $50,000

Grave of the Vampire is a 1972 American vampire film directed by John Hayes, and starring William Smith, Michael Pataki, and Lyn Peters. Its plot follows a vampire who rapes a living woman, resulting in the birth of a child who feeds only on blood. It is based on the novel The Still Life by David Chase.

The film is also known as Seed of Terror (American reissue title).

== Plot ==
In 1940 California, college student Paul proposes to his girlfriend, Leslie Hollander, in the cemetery where they shared their first kiss. During the proposal, Caleb Croft—a serial rapist and murderer in life, now a vampire—awakens from his crypt. Caleb brutally murders Paul and rapes Leslie. A local lieutenant, Panzer, investigates the crime, and discovers that Croft's tomb is also empty.

Panzer visits a catatonic Leslie in the hospital. When he shows her a mugshot of Croft, she violently recoils. It turns out that Croft was a prolific murderer and rapist in Massachusetts, who was electrocuted to death in the Boston Subway while attempting to flee from police. To prevent locals from vandalizing his grave, his body was entombed in California. While wandering through the town, Croft enters the home of a local housewife, kills her and feeds on her blood. Before Leslie is discharged from the hospital, her doctor informs her she is pregnant, but that the fetus appears abnormal. Leslie believes the child to be Paul's, but her doctor insists she get an abortion, which she adamantly refuses. Meanwhile, Panzer returns to Croft's tomb, but is killed by the vampire in the process.

Some months later, Leslie—orphaned by her parents—gives birth to her son. Her housekeeper, Olga, urges Leslie to contact the town doctor, as the infant is pallid and will not take milk. Eventually, Leslie soon finds that the newborn gains strength by consuming blood. Leslie begins drawing her own blood into syringes and filling bottles to feed the baby, whom she names James.

Thirty years later, Leslie dies. Blaming him for his mother's suffering, the adult James chooses to dedicate his life to hunting his father. In one of the towns along his journey, James enrolls in a folk mythology class, where he meets Anita Jacoby, a graduate student, and her roommate Anne Arthur. James is unaware that the professor, Adrian Lockwood, is in fact Caleb Croft, who has assumed a new identity. During their first seminar, James gains Croft's attention by espousing his knowledge of the story of Charles Croydon, a 17th-century Englishman thought to be a vampire, as well as the case of Caleb Croft. After class, Anne has a brief conversation with Croft, during which he tells her she reminds him of his late wife, Sarah.

Later that night, Croft murders the university librarian. Meanwhile, James attends a party with Anita, who informs him she believes Croydon and Croft may have been the same person. James subsequently has Anne over to his apartment, and the two have sex. Meanwhile, Croft visits Anne and Anita's apartment, finding Anita there alone. Anita confronts Croft with her knowledge of his identity, and asks that he turn her into a vampire as well, so she can be his bride. Croft pretends to agree, but then takes a knife and slashes her throat. A short time later, Anne returns to her apartment and finds Anita's corpse. Croft himself appears nearby. James hears Anne's screams and rushes into her apartment to rescue her; Croft escapes unseen.

The following evening, James and Anne visit Croft's lavish estate along with four other graduate students. There, Croft conducts a séance in which he hypnotizes them. Croft calls out to his dead wife, Sarah, and instructs her to possess Anne. Instead, Anita, speaking from beyond the grave, possesses Anne's body, and exposes Croft as a vampire to the students. Croft sternly instructs Anne to cast Anita out of her body; she subsequently collapses on the floor. While James carries Anne upstairs, Croft kills the remaining students. James returns, and a violent struggle ensues between him and Croft. Realizing that Croft is his father, James drives a stake through his heart. Croft dies, but moments later, James begins to convulse in pain. Anne regains consciousness and stumbles upon the scene. James urges her to get away from him. Anne looks on in horror as James stares at her vacantly, now bearing fangs himself.

"The film ends with the written words “Fin. Ou peut-être pas?...” The French phrase translates as “The End. Or perhaps not?”

== Cast ==
- William Smith as James Eastman
- Michael Pataki as Caleb Croft / Professor Adrian Lockwood
- Lyn Peters as Anne Arthur
- Diane Holden as Anita Jacoby
- Lieux Dressler as Olga
- Eric Mason as Lieutenant Panzer
- Jay Adler as Old Zack
- Jay Scott as Paul
- William Guhl as Sergeant Duffy
- Margaret Fairchild as Miss Fenwick
- Carmen Argenziano as Sam
- Abbi Henderson as Carol Moskowitz
- Kitty Vallacher as Leslie Hollander
- Inga Neilsen as Leticia
- Lindis Guinness as Housewife

== Development ==
Grave of the Vampire was made on an estimated budget of $50,000 and was shot in eleven days in downtown Los Angeles, California. Many of Pataki's fight scenes were performed by stunt coordinator Joe Pronto and one scene depicting an overhead lift was shot in reverse to achieve the effect.

== Release ==
Grave of the Vampire released on September 13, 1972 and has since fallen into the public domain. The film has also been titled Seed of Terror. Per Clive Davies, the film was edited for American audiences and an uncut version was released to European audiences.

=== Critical response ===
Upon its initial release Grave of the Vampire gained attention for its depiction of a mother cutting herself to feed her child blood. It has since received praise from online outlets and critics decades after its initial release, with some critics noting that the film was "prescient in its anticipation of contemporary concerns". Tor.com noted that the movie was "notable for its details rather than its broad strokes. If you can watch it in the context of its times, it’s quite revolutionary in its treatment of its female characters, allowing them a glimmer of equality in a genre where they were usually required to do little but look pretty and scream." Daily Dead noted that the film "changed things up a little and injected a bit of fresh plasma into a sub-genre desperate for a transfusion."

=== Home media ===
The film was first on Mill Creek Entertainment's "200 Tales of Terror" DVD Collection. Shout! Factory's Scream Factory line announced they are releasing the film on Blu-ray on April 16, 2019.

== See also ==
- List of American films of 1972
- Vampire films

== Sources ==
- Davies, Clive (2015). Spinegrinder: The Movies Most Critics Won't Write About. London, England: Headpress. ISBN 978-1-909-39427-8.
- Freese, Gene (2017). Classic Movie Fight Scenes: 75 Years of Bare Knuckle Brawls, 1914-1989. Jefferson, North Carolina: McFarland. ISBN 978-1-4766-6943-4.
- Puchalski, Steven (2002). Slimetime: A Guide to Sleazy, Mindless Movies. London, England: Headpress/Critical Vision. ISBN 978-1-900486-21-7.
- Twitchell, James B. (1985). Dreadful Pleasures: An Anatomy of Modern Horror. Oxford, England: Oxford University Press. ISBN 978-0-19-503566-7.
- Waller, Gregory A. (2010). The Living and the Undead: Slaying Vampires, Exterminating Zombies. Carbondale, Illinois: University of Illinois Press. ISBN 978-0-252-09033-2.
