= The Erotic Traveler =

Television series

- Written by: Anthony L. Greene; N.D. French; Nancy French; Stephen Shaw
- Directed by: Gary Dean Orona
- Starring: Divini Rae; Kaylani Lei
- Music by: Lucas Hoge
- Original language: English

Production
- Producer: Tabitha Stevens
- Running time: 30 min. per episode
- Production company: HBO Entertainment

Original release
- Release: February 3 – April 28, 2007

The Erotic Traveler is a 2007 late-night Cinemax softcore television series directed by Gary Dean Orona and starring actresses Divini Rae and Kaylani Lei, both of whom are shown in intense sexual encounters.

== Premise ==
The episodes of this anthology series center around erotic photographer Marissa Johnson and her pupil Allison Kraft, two young women who use photographs and works of art to take episodic settings all over the world.

The setting for the series was in Greenriver, Utah.

== Cast ==
=== Main cast ===
- Divini Rae as Marissa Johanson
- Kaylani Lei as Allison Kraft

=== Notable guest stars ===
- Monique Alexander
- Robin Banks
- Brooke Banner
- Sarah Blake
- Clayton Cannon
- Billy Chapell
- Jeff Christian
- Chris Conrad
- Tonya Cooley
- Michael Coons
- Brett Copeland
- Scott Cruz
- Frankie Cullen
- Damien
- Christian Dion
- Jesse Felsen
- Tyler Finn
- Vince Gotti
- Molinee Green
- Hannah Harper
- Ruston Head
- Lacie Heart
- Roxy Jezel
- Amy Lindsay
- Sarge Logan
- Shy Love
- Michelle Maylene
- Jaden Mcale
- Gizele Mendez
- Nina Mercedez
- Anton Michael
- Katie Morgan
- Christine Nguyen
- Larry Omaha
- Rafael Ortiz
- Teagan Presley
- Adrian Quiñonez
- Damian T. Raven
- Sophia Santi
- Galen Senogles
- Kris Slater
- Levi Steele
- Tabitha Stevens
- Tiffany Taylor
- Mark Weiler

== Episodes ==
| No. | Title | Directed by | Written by | Original release date |
|---|---|---|---|---|
| 1 | "Molded Image" | Gary Dean Orona | Stephen Shaw | February 3, 2007 |
The young and brazen erotic photographer Allison Kraft crashes a party at Marissa Johanson's art gallery.
| 2 | "Lost in Ecstasy" | Gary Dean Orona | A.G. Lawrence | February 10, 2007 |
Marissa and Allison debate a photo of a couple in a passionate embrace.
| 3 | "A Man and Two Women" | Gary Dean Odona | A.G. Lawrence | February 17, 2007 |
Allison fills in for Marissa for an erotic shoot. However, she learns that there is much more to capturing true sensuality than pointing and clicking.
| 4 | "Naked Pearls" | Gary Dean Odona | Nancy French | February 24, 2007 |
A stranded motorist in South France is helped by a lovely local girl in his mission to return a special set of pearls.
| 5 | "The Girl from Jimena" | Gary Dean Odona | A.G. Lawrence | March 3, 2007 |
A modeling agent takes a young girl from Brazil off to New York to become a super model.
| 6 | "Stripped" | Gary Dean Odona | Nancy French | March 10, 2007 |
Marissa tells the story of her photograph safari in Egypt. She and the other students spent more time hooking up than they did studying photography.
| 7 | "Carnal Cabaret" | Gary Dean Odona | A.G. Lawrence | March 17, 2007 |
Marissa receives a Cheetah mask in the mail. The final piece of her collection; A novice photographer takes the pictures of the love of his life at a cabaret in France.
| 8 | "Baring It in Bali" | Gary Dean Odona | N.D. French | March 24, 2007 |
An older woman finds romance with a younger man. However, the age difference bothers her deeply.
| 9 | "Object of Desire" | Gary Dean Odona | A.G. Lawrence | March 31, 2007 |
Marissa has a picture stolen from her gallery. The search for the picture re-ignites passion with the town sheriff.
| 10 | "Sax on the Beach" | Gary Dean Odona | N.D. French | April 7, 2007 |
An out of luck sax player finds his groove again when he meets a beautiful dancer on the beach. Her move makes his music come alive.
| 11 | "Closer" | Gary Dean Odona | N.D. French | April 14, 2007 |
Jake and Denise want to return a picture that Allison took because they say it made everything go wrong.
| 12 | "Stolen Image" | Gary Dean Odona | Stephen Shaw | April 21, 2007 |
Marissa tells the story of how she recklessly made love with a bank robber while on assignment in Spain.
| 13 | "Self-Portrait" | Gary Dean Odona | A.G. Lawrence | April 28, 2007 |
Things heat up for Allison and her old flame at her first showing in New York. Marissa and Sheriff Clayton take a road trip and find passion.
