= Playboy Radio =

Satellite and internet radio station

- Broadcast area: United States, Canada

Programming
- Format: Adult Entertainment

Ownership
- Owner: Playboy Enterprises

History
- First air date: 2006-03-14

Playboy Radio was an internet radio station originally launched on XM Satellite Radio on September 1, 2002. Its programming was dedicated to similar topics and celebrity personalities found in its parent publication, Playboy Magazine. It was XM's first premium station — offered à la carte on top of the base XM subscription price. Playboy Radio gained a healthy following, including a dedicated group of Night Calls fans that established a strong online presence, although some complained the station offered too little content for the monthly premium.

On August 20, 2005, the XM Satellite Radio website informed customers that as of September 1, 2005, XM would no longer offer the Playboy Radio channel. The removal of Playboy Radio brought the end of XM's premium stations as High Voltage was made available free of charge to all subscribers earlier in the year.

In January 2006, XM's competitor Sirius Satellite Radio announced they were picking up Playboy Radio and would be offering additional content. Playboy Radio debuted on Sirius Satellite Radio on March 1, 2006 on channel 198. Sirius made Playboy Radio free of charge, though subscribers could "opt-in" to access stream of the channel online. Sirius moved Playboy Radio to channel 102 on both services on May 4, 2011.

Following the Sirius / XM merger, Playboy Radio returned to XM on September 30, 2008 as part of its "Best of Sirius" package and broadcast on channel 99.

On March 9, 2013, Kevin Klein and Andrea Lowell announced on The Playboy Morning Show that Playboy would no longer be featured on SiriusXM and instead would become available via a standalone online site (PlayboyRadio.com). On March 14, 2013, SiriusXM officially discontinued the channel.

Prior to leaving SiriusXM, the Playboy Radio team expanded on its slate of content to be prepared when SiriusXM discontinued their feed. The Playboy Radio streaming pure play to focus on creating a radio station that embodied the soul of the magazine and founder, Hugh Hefner. It operated as an advertisement-free subscription service and offered paid members 24-hour-a-day programming.

Playboy Radio quietly turned off its amplifiers on July 1, 2017 without public fanfare. The final capture of their Web site by the Wayback Machine occurred on December 23, 2017. Their parent company, Playboy Enterprises, has issued no word about the fate of the URL or the future of the service.

== Programming ==
Original programs included Night Calls Radio hosted by adult film star Juli Ashton and Playboy TV star Tiffany Granath as well as Playboy's Sexcetera with reporter Kira Reed. Hall of Fame porn star Christy Canyon was brought in as a replacement when Ashton left to pursue other ventures in April/May 2005. The channel also featured programs such as Playboy TV's Sex Court, The Weekend Flash and Sexy Stories.

In 2010, the Playmate Club radio show launched featuring Patrice Hollis and DJ Colleen Shannon.

== Shows ==
- Afternoon Advice, an afternoon call-in show hosted by Tiffany Granath and a rotating panel of "sex experts."
- Ask The Doc Show, hosted by Chad and Sunny from Doc Johnson. The first show ever recorded from the dildo factory.
- Dave Navarro’s Dark Matter
- ForPlay, a video game industry news and review podcast hosted by YouTube personality AngelikMayhem
- Funny Bunny, a show hosted by Playboy playmates and comics from Sideshow Network
- Head Games, hosted by Maya Jordan and comedian Allan Finn. The show gives men advice on how to get the woman of their dreams.
- Hooking Up, hosted by Simone Bienne and Kevin Klein
- In Bed, hosted by Jessica Drake
- Just For The Articles, a dark humor sketch comedy show hosted by Joel Dovev
- Mansion Mayhem, with Brian Olea (of The Girls Next Door fame) and Playboy Playmate of the Year 2013 Raquel Pomplun. Former hosts include Pilar Lastra.
- Miller and Mailhouse
- Night Calls, hosted by Nicki Hunter
- Playboy's Playbook, a show on gear and gadgets
- Playboy Radio en Espanol, an old-school spicy radio show in Spanish
- Playboy Radio Interview hosted by Josh Cooperman
- Playmate Club, hosted by Patrice Hollis and DJ Colleen Shannon
- Sexperts, a show about sex research
- Sexy Beast with Andrea Lowell, dedicated to health, fitness, and sexiness
- Swing with Holli and Michael and "Swing-Full Swap", reality based shows on the swinger lifestyle
- "The Karlie Redd Show", featuring reality show star, Karlie Redd, of Love & Hip Hop: Atlanta. Karlie Redd's popularity with television has garnered the station a legion of new listeners, making her show one of the radio station's flagship shows in its program content lineup. Redd's ability to show such strength in numbers and listeners in comparison to the length of time her show has aired shows her to be a power broker at the network.
- The Morning After hosted by Jessica Hall
- The Panic Switch, a show on extreme sports hosted by Playboy Playmate Charis B.
- The Playboy Morning Show, billed as "an audio version of Playboy and featuring segments by the magazine's founder and editor-in-chief Hugh Hefner
- The Playmate Hour, featuring current and past Playboy Playmate centerfolds
- The Real Ally Show, a dark humor show on lesbians
- Under Cover, hosted by Suzy McCoppin
