= E-Rotic (TV series) =

- Country of origin: United States

Production
- Running time: 30 mins

Original release
- Network: Playboy TV
- Release: 2009

E-Rotic (stylized as e-Rotic) was a Playboy TV newsmagazine profiling popular adult websites and the personalities behind them.

== Format ==
Similar to the format of the other Playboy TV shows, Sexcetera and 69 Sexy Things 2 Do Before You Die, e-Rotic used investigative journalism to probe behind popular sex-driven websites.

Since its debut in April 2009, sites profiled have included Naughty America, Ken Marcus' erotic galleries, and the personal homepage of adult actress, Catalina Cruz.

The second episode profiled the personal homepage of fitness, bikini and glamour model Jenny Poussin at Jenny Poussin VIP.

Playboy regular Kira Reed served as consulting producer.
