= Playboy Prime =

- Country of origin: United States
- No. of episodes: 52

Production
- Running time: 60 minutes

Original release
- Network: Playboy TV
- Release: 2007

Playboy Prime is an adult reality compilation series of Playboy TV programming.

== Format ==
Marketed as a Playboy TV greatest hits collection, Playboy Prime consisted of 52 different 60-minute compilations containing segments from past and current shows from the network. 6-7 different series were usually packaged into one episode, with new Playmate bumpers and narration added to segue between pieces. Episodes premiered during the "primetime" 8 p.m. hour on Playboy TV

In addition to utilizing segments and skits from existing Playboy TV shows, several new 10 minute pieces were created specifically for use on Playboy Prime. Two segments in particular were Hot Babes Doing Stuff Naked and Gadget Or The Girl, hosted by Last Comic Standing winner, Iliza Shlesinger.

Other Playboy TV programs packaged into Playboy Prime included Totally Busted, 69 Sexy Things 2 Do Before You Die, and Around the World in 80 Babes.
