= Money Talks =

Money Talks may refer to:

== Film and television ==
- Money Talks (1926 film), lost MGM film
- Money Talks (1932 film), British film by Norman Lee
- Money Talks (1940 film), Hungarian film directed by Jenő Csepreghy
- Money Talks (1972 film), hidden-camera documentary film by Allen Funt
- Money Talks (1997 film), comedy film directed by Brett Ratner and starring Chris Tucker and Charlie Sheen
- Money Talks (TV series), 2009 adult reality game show on Playboy TV
- Money Talks News, a nationally syndicated financial news program
- "Money Talks" (SpongeBob SquarePants), an episode of SpongeBob SquarePants
- "Money Talks", an episode of Mystery Science Theater 3000

== Music ==
=== Albums ===
- Money Talks (The Bar-Kays album), 1978
- Money Talks (Trooper album), 1982
- Money Talks, a 1987 album by Cryptic Slaughter
- Money Talks (soundtrack) (1997), with its title track by Andrea Martin & Lil' Kim

=== Songs ===
- "Money Talks", a 1972 song by Mack Rice
- "Money Talks" (The Kinks song), 1974
- "Money Talks", a 1982 song by Rick James from Throwin' Down
- "Money Talks", a 1983 song by J.J. Cale from #8
- "Money Talks", a 1983 song by April Wine from Animal Grace
- "Money Talks", a 1984 song by Soul Asylum from Say What You Will, Clarence... Karl Sold the Truck
- "Money Talks", a 1987 song by the Alan Parsons Project from Gaudi
- "Dirty Cash" (Money Talks), a 1989 song by The Adventures of Stevie V
- "Moneytalks", a 1990 song by AC/DC from The Razors Edge
- "Money Talks", a 1991 song by Living Colour from Biscuits
- "Money Talks", a 1994 song by Wolfsbane from Wolfsbane
- "Money Talks", a 2001 song by Saga from House of Cards
- "Money Talks", a 2005 song by Deep Purple from Rapture of the Deep
- "Money Talks", a 2007 song by the Player Piano from Satellite

== See also ==
- Money Talk (disambiguation)
