= Co-Ed Confidential =

- Created by: Marc L. Greenberg
- Starring: Michelle Maylene; Brad Bufanda; Hannah Harper; Kevin Patrick
- Composer: Herman Beeftink
- Country of origin: United States
- Original language: English
- No. of seasons: 4
- No. of episodes: 52

Production
- Executive producer: Marc L. Greenberg
- Camera setup: Film; Single-camera
- Running time: 23 minutes
- Production companies: MRG Entertainment; HBO Entertainment

Original release
- Network: Cinemax
- Release: November 2, 2007 – August 27, 2010

Co-Ed Confidential is a cable series that is Cinemax's erotic remake of National Lampoon's Animal House (1978) and was originally shown on Cinemax.

== Production ==
The series made its premiere in 2007 and had four seasons comprising a total of 52 original episodes plus six compilations. This series mainly contains simulated sex scenes. The fourth season premiered June 1, 2010 and the series finale aired on August 27, 2010. A reunion aired on July 23, 2014 featuring Michelle Maylene, Brad Bufanda, and Andre Boyer.

== Plot ==
The dean of students at a university shuts down a wild fraternity called Omega House. The building is then turned into a co-ed residence for four freshmen supervised by graduate student Ophelia (Hannah Harper) and her significant other, James, the former president of Omega House.

== Reception ==
Many have praised the show for having witty scripts and dialog for a soft core show. The erotic series premiered on November 2, 2007. The program is said to be a hybrid of comedy and soft core; the first of its kind for the genre.

== Cast ==
- Michelle Maylene as Karen (Seasons 1–4)
- Brad Bufanda as Larry (Seasons 2–4)
- Hannah Harper as Ophelia (Seasons 1–3)
- Kevin Patrick as James (Seasons 1–4)
- Andre Boyer as Freddy (Season 1)
- Brandon Ruckdashel as Zach (Seasons 3 and 4)
- Sandra Luesse as Lisa (Season 1)
- Oskar Rodriguez as Jose (Season 1)
- Kelli McCarty as Phyllicia (Season 4)
- Charmane Star as Erin (Seasons 3 and 4)
- Misty Stone as Dawn (Season 4)
- Sydnee Steele as Karen's Stepmother (Seasons 1–4)
- Kaylani Lei as Minx (Seasons 2–4)
- Aurora Snow as Lacey (Seasons 1 and 2)
- Randy Spears as Karen's Father (Seasons 2–4)
- Sunny Leone as Stripper (Season 1)
- Brooke Haven as Stripper (Season 2)
- Dena Kollar as Layla (Seasons 3 and 4)
- Leigh Livingston as Ciara (Season 2 and 4)
- Daisy Marie as Sophie (Season 2)
- Mia Presley as Ice Princess (Seasons 3 and 4)
- Jennifer Dark as Olga (Season 4)
- Adam Trahan as Cooper (Season 2)
- Olivia Alaina May as Emmanuelle / Emily (Season 2)
- Stephen Hansen as Guillermo (Season 2)

== Episodes ==
=== Season 1 (2007–08) ===
| No. overall | No. in season | Title | Directed by | Written by | Original release date |
|---|---|---|---|---|---|
| 1 | 1 | "The First Time" | Demitri Nessun | Dallas Pope | November 2, 2007 |
| 2 | 2 | "What a Rush" | Unknown | Unknown | November 9, 2007 |
| 3 | 3 | "Of Co-ed Bondage" | Unknown | Unknown | November 17, 2007 |
| 4 | 4 | "Breaking Up" | Demitri Nessun | Jodie Miller | November 24, 2007 |
| 5 | 5 | "Clothing Optional" | Unknown | Unknown | November 30, 2007 |
| 6 | 6 | "I Never" | Unknown | Unknown | December 7, 2007 |
| 7 | 7 | "Blind Date" | Unknown | Unknown | December 15, 2007 |
| 8 | 8 | "The Intervention" | Unknown | Unknown | December 21, 2007 |
| 9 | 9 | "The Climax Killer" | Demitri Nessun | Jodie Miller | December 28, 2007 |
| 10 | 10 | "When Virgins Attack" | Demitri Nessun | Ellis Walker | January 4, 2008 |
| 11 | 11 | "I Don't" | Unknown | Unknown | January 11, 2008 |
| 12 | 12 | "Butt Naked" | Unknown | Unknown | January 18, 2008 |
| 13 | 13 | "Happy Endings" | Demitri Nessun | Ellis Walker | January 25, 2008 |

=== Season 2 (2008) ===
| No. overall | No. in season | Title | Directed by | Written by | Original release date |
|---|---|---|---|---|---|
| 14 | 1 | "Welcome Back" | Roy Krugrant | Jodi Miller | June 12, 2008 |
| 15 | 2 | "Undecided" | Roy Krugrant | Dallas Pope | June 15, 2008 |
| 16 | 3 | "French Style" | Roy Krugrant | Jodi Miller | June 27, 2008 |
| 17 | 4 | "The Hunt is On" | Roy Krugrant | Dallas Pope | July 4, 2008 |
| 18 | 5 | "Rolling Royce" | Roy Krugrant | Jodi Miller | July 11, 2008 |
| 19 | 6 | "Star Whores" | Roy Krugrant | Dallas Pope | July 18, 2008 |
| 20 | 7 | "The Truth Will Out" | Roy Krugrant | Jodi Miller | July 25, 2008 |
| 21 | 8 | "Educating Larry" | Roy Krugrant | Jodi Miller | August 1, 2008 |
| 22 | 9 | "Splitsville" | Roy Krugrant | Jodi Miller | August 8, 2008 |
| 23 | 10 | "Forget to Remember" | Roy Krugrant | Dallas Pope | August 15, 2008 |
| 24 | 11 | "The Bachelor Party" | Roy Krugrant | Dallas Pope | August 22, 2008 |
| 25 | 12 | "Cold Feet" | Roy Krugrant | Jodi Miller | August 29, 2008 |
| 26 | 13 | "I Do, Do I?" | Roy Krugrant | Jodi Miller | September 5, 2008 |

=== Season 3 (2009) ===
| No. overall | No. in season | Title | Directed by | Written by | Original release date |
|---|---|---|---|---|---|
| 27 | 1 | "Fact vs. Fiction" | Issac Dovidad | Theodore Logan | April 3, 2009 |
| 28 | 2 | "Spring Breakup" | Unknown | Unknown | April 10, 2009 |
| 29 | 3 | "Girls Gone Mild" | Unknown | Unknown | April 17, 2009 |
| 30 | 4 | "The Dumbest Guy in the World" | Unknown | Unknown | April 24, 2009 |
| 31 | 5 | "The Power of Suggestion" | Unknown | Unknown | May 1, 2009 |
| 32 | 6 | "An Ill Wind Blows" | Unknown | Unknown | May 8, 2009 |
| 33 | 7 | "The Wet and the Wild" | Unknown | Unknown | May 15, 2009 |
| 34 | 8 | "Three Days of the Cougar" | Unknown | Unknown | May 22, 2009 |
| 35 | 9 | "Riding the Air Waves" | Unknown | Unknown | May 29, 2009 |
| 36 | 10 | "Got Balls" | Unknown | Unknown | June 5, 2009 |
| 37 | 11 | "Blast From the Past" | Unknown | Unknown | June 12, 2009 |
| 38 | 12 | "Let the Games Begin" | Unknown | Unknown | June 19, 2009 |
| 39 | 13 | "It Ain't Over Til It's Over" | Unknown | Unknown | June 26, 2009 |

=== Season 4 (2010) ===
| No. overall | No. in season | Title | Directed by | Written by | Original release date |
|---|---|---|---|---|---|
| 40 | 1 | "Staying Power" | Unknown | Unknown | June 4, 2010 |
| 41 | 2 | "After Party Girl" | Unknown | Unknown | June 11, 2010 |
| 42 | 3 | "Finding Mr. Right Now" | Unknown | Unknown | June 18, 2010 |
| 43 | 4 | "Hot for Teacher" | Unknown | Unknown | June 25, 2010 |
| 44 | 5 | "How Minx Got Her Groove Back" | Unknown | Unknown | July 2, 2010 |
| 45 | 6 | "Girls in Love" | Unknown | Unknown | July 10, 2010 |
| 46 | 7 | "Let Me Seduce You" | Unknown | Unknown | July 16, 2010 |
| 47 | 8 | "Come As You Are" | Unknown | Unknown | July 23, 2010 |
| 48 | 9 | "CSI Coed" | Unknown | Unknown | July 30, 2010 |
| 49 | 10 | "It's Not What It Looks Like" | Fredrick Vaughn | Jodie Miller | August 7, 2010 |
| 50 | 11 | "Future Sex" | Unknown | Unknown | August 13, 2010 |
| 51 | 12 | "Performance Anxiety" | Unknown | Unknown | August 21, 2010 |
| 52 | 13 | "The Last Hurrah" | Unknown | Unknown | August 27, 2010 |
