= Michelle Maylene =

American pornographic film actress

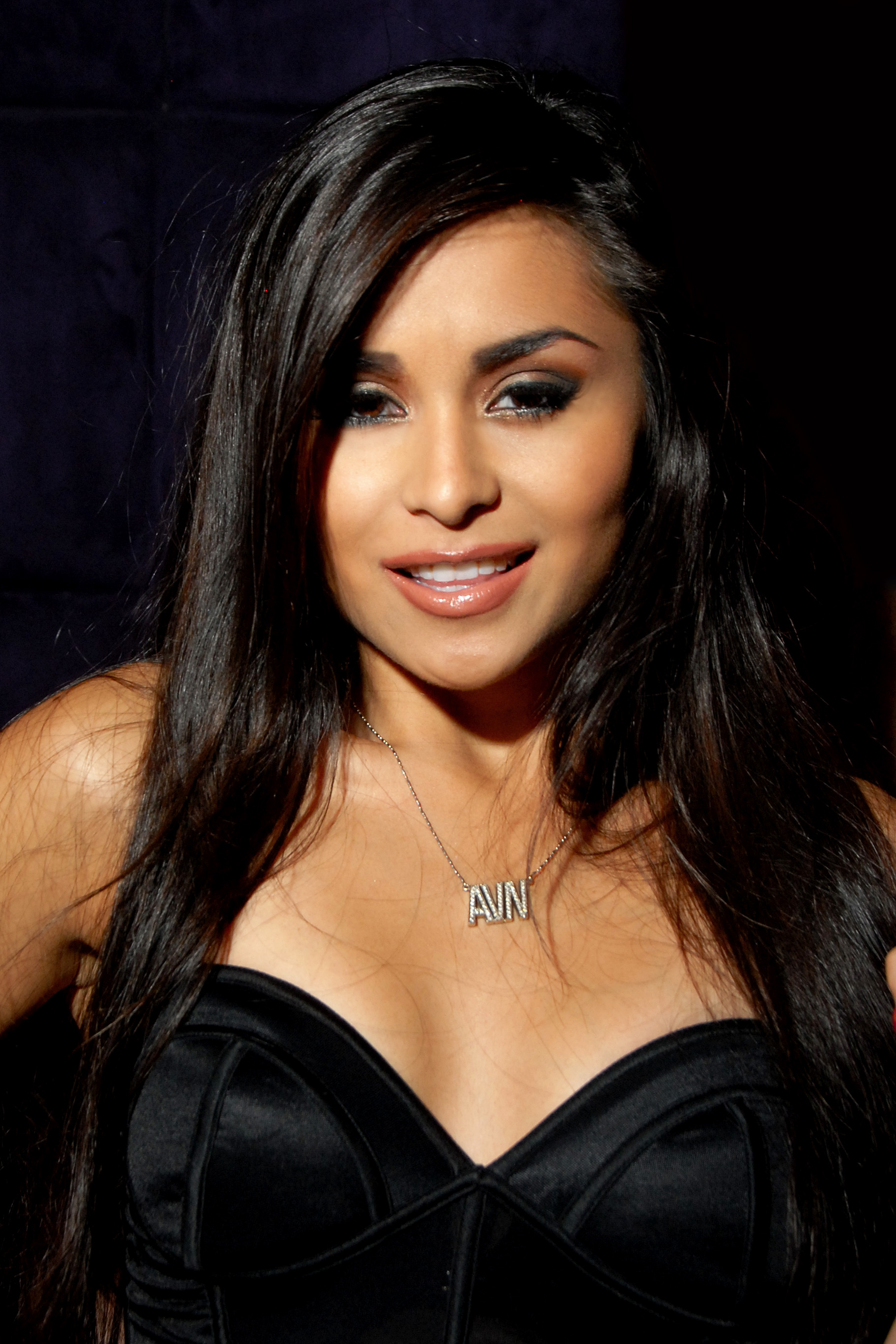
- Maylene in 2009
- Occupations: Actress; model; adult film star

Michelle Maylene is an American actress, model, and former adult film star. She came to prominence through her role as "Karen" in Co-Ed Confidential from 2007 to 2010 and has appeared in Playboy TV and Cinemax's Chemistry. Maylene has been nominated for XRCO and AVN Awards. In 2018 she was inducted into the Urban X Hall of Fame.

== Career ==
Maylene made her debut as a featured dancer in 2006. Her mother was also an exotic dancer.

Maylene appeared on Jenna Jameson’s American Sex Star and was a finalist on the first season. She has appeared on Playboy TV's Night Calls and Canoga Park, and, as of 2008, she was a news correspondent on the Adult Video News video website AVNLive.com.

Maylene portrayed the role of "Esha", in an episode called "Downtime", in the 2011 Cinemax television series Chemistry.

In 2011, Complex magazine ranked her at #28 on their list of "The Top 50 Hottest Asian Porn Stars of All Time."

== Personal life ==
She was once engaged to actor Marcus Patrick.

== Awards and nominations ==
- 2005 XRCO Award nominee – Cream Dream
- 2007 AVN Award nominee – Best New Starlet
- 2008 AVN Award nominee – Best Crossover Star
- 2018 Urban X Hall of Fame

== Select Filmography ==
Year	Title	Role	Notes
2015	The Salad Mixxxer	Porn Daughter	TV short
2015	College Coeds vs. Zombie Housewives	Laurel	
2015	Passionate Intentions	Maggie / Greg's secretary	TV movie
2016	Best Thanksgiving Ever	Kayla	
2017	Sexy Nurses	Evangeline	
2019	Bikini Sorority House		
2020	The Comeback Trail	Sister Mary Lilith	
2020	Girl Lost: A Hollywood Story	Sexy woman	
2022	Haunted Hotties		
