= Brad Norton =

American ice hockey player (born 1975)

- Born: February 13, 1975 (age 51) Cambridge, Massachusetts, U.S.
- Height: 6 ft 6 in (198 cm)
- Weight: 248 lb (112 kg; 17 st 10 lb)
- Position: Defense
- Shot: Left
- Played for: Florida Panthers; Los Angeles Kings; Washington Capitals; Jokerit; Ottawa Senators; Detroit Red Wings
- NHL draft: 215th overall, 1993; Edmonton Oilers
- Playing career: 1998–2007

Bradley Norton (born February 13, 1975) is an American former professional ice hockey defenseman. Norton played for five seasons in the National Hockey League (NHL).

== Playing career ==
Norton started his professional career with the Detroit Vipers in the IHL in 1997. He was drafted in the 1993 NHL entry draft as the Edmonton Oilers' ninth-round pick, #215 overall. He has played a total of 124 NHL games with the Florida Panthers, Los Angeles Kings, Washington Capitals, Ottawa Senators and the Detroit Red Wings.

Norton signed with Jokerit in the Finnish SM-liiga. On December 15, 2006, he abruptly left the team to play in North America by invoking an NHL release clause in his contract. The Senators signed Norton to a one-year two-way deal on March 7, 2006. He gained viral video fame that year when his 16 April non-fight with Montreal Canadiens enforcer Aaron Downey. The two squared off with fists raised for forty seconds before being escorted to the penalty box without having thrown a punch or made contact in any way.

On June 23, 2006, Norton was signed by the Detroit Red Wings. He started the 2006–07 season, with the Red Wings, but injury struck and he was assigned to affiliate, the Grand Rapids Griffins, upon recovery.

Norton signed a one-year contract with the San Jose Sharks on July 18, 2007. Norton did not play a game with the Sharks as a back injury caused him to miss the season.

== Personal life ==
He is the younger brother of former NHLer Jeff Norton, and is married to Playboy Radio afternoon advice show host Tiffany Granath. Norton was born in Cambridge, Massachusetts, attended Cushing Academy in Ashburnham, Massachusetts, but grew up in Acton, Massachusetts.

== Career statistics ==
			Regular season					Playoffs
Season	Team	League	GP	G	A	Pts	PIM	GP	G	A	Pts	PIM
1994–95	UMass-Amherst	HE	30	0	6	6	89	—	—	—	—	—
1995–96	UMass-Amherst	HE	34	4	12	16	99	—	—	—	—	—
1996–97	UMass-Amherst	HE	35	2	16	18	88	—	—	—	—	—
1997–98	UMass-Amherst	HE	20	2	13	15	28	—	—	—	—	—
1997–98	Detroit Vipers	IHL	33	1	4	5	56	22	0	2	2	87
1998–99	Hamilton Bulldogs	AHL	58	1	8	9	134	11	0	1	1	6
1999–00	Hamilton Bulldogs	AHL	40	5	12	17	104	10	1	4	5	26
2000–01	Hamilton Bulldogs	AHL	46	3	15	18	114	—	—	—	—	—
2001–02	Hershey Bears	AHL	40	0	10	10	62	2	0	0	0	6
2001–02	Florida Panthers	NHL	22	0	2	2	45	—	—	—	—	—
2002–03	Los Angeles Kings	NHL	53	3	3	6	97	—	—	—	—	—
2003–04	Los Angeles Kings	NHL	20	0	1	1	77	—	—	—	—	—
2003–04	Washington Capitals	NHL	16	0	1	1	17	—	—	—	—	—
2005–06	Jokerit	SM-l	20	2	2	4	91	—	—	—	—	—
2005–06	Binghamton Senators	AHL	36	0	4	4	102	—	—	—	—	—
2005–06	Ottawa Senators	NHL	7	0	0	0	31	—	—	—	—	—
2006–07	Detroit Red Wings	NHL	6	0	1	1	20	—	—	—	—	—
2006–07	Grand Rapids Griffins	AHL	43	1	4	5	102	7	1	2	3	24
NHL totals			124	3	8	11	287	—	—	—	—	—

== Awards and honours ==
Award	Year
AHL
All-Star Game	2000
