= Tiffany Granath =

American actress and satellite radio personality

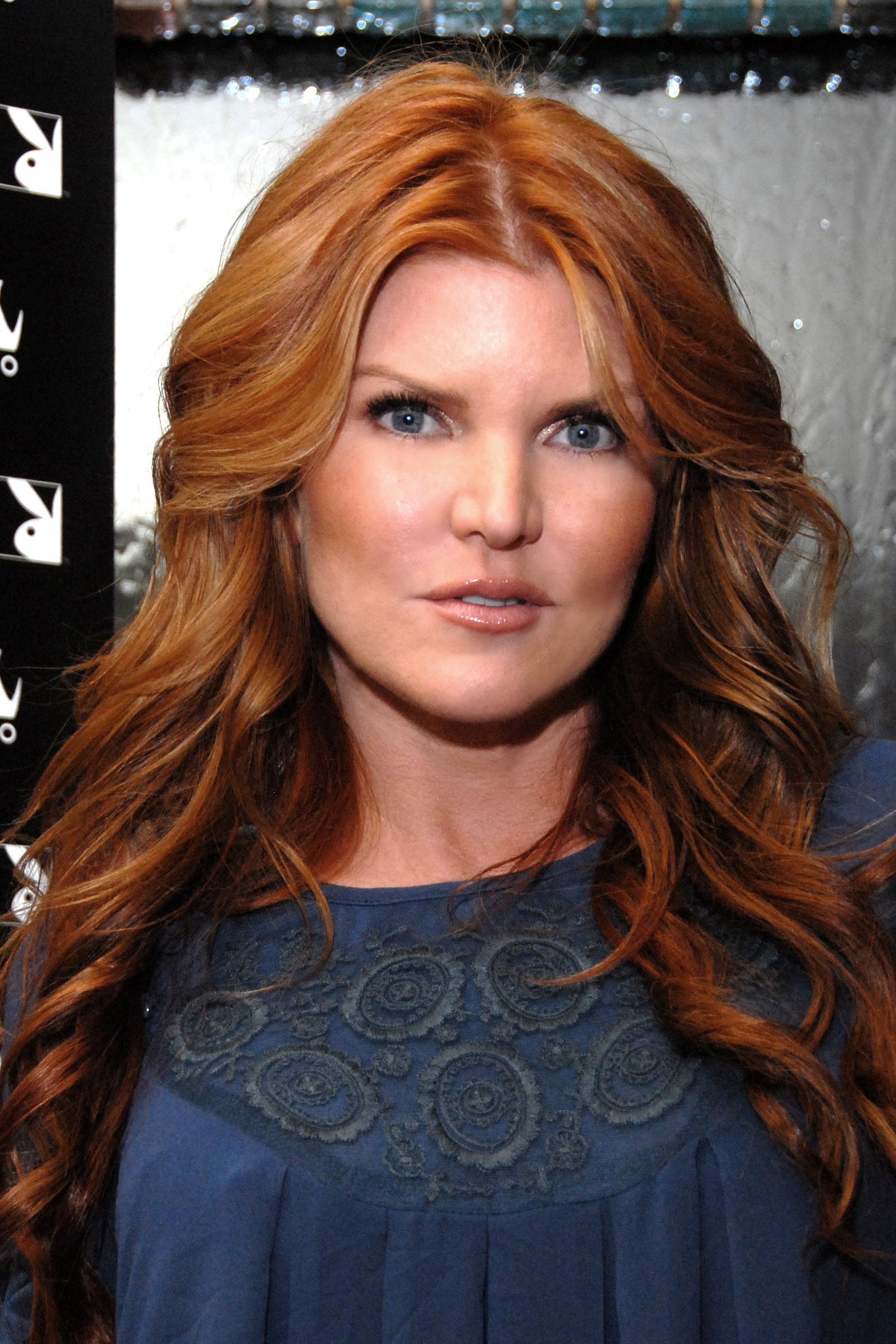
- Tiffany Granath at a Live Playboy Radio Show, Beverly Hills, 2008
- Born: Tiffany Leigh Granath; May 25, 1968 (age 58); Fort Knox, Kentucky, United States
- Other name: Houston Leigh
- Occupations: actress and radio personality
- Years active: 1995–2010
- Spouse: Brad Norton
- Website: http://www.tiffanygranath.com

Tiffany Granath is an American actress and satellite radio personality.

== Career ==
Following graduation from high school, Granath moved to Los Angeles, California to pursue a career in dance and wound up touring with both The Beach Boys and Bette Midler. She subsequently went on to act in a handful of films and TV shows as well as appear in assorted Playboy videos.

In the early 2000s, Granath was the co-host of Night Calls on Playboy TV alongside Juli Ashton. The pair hosted the Playboy Radio show of the same name.

Granath was the former host of the Tiffany Granath Show on Playboy Radio. The show was cancelled in 2013.
