= Tory Lane =

American actress (born 1982/83)

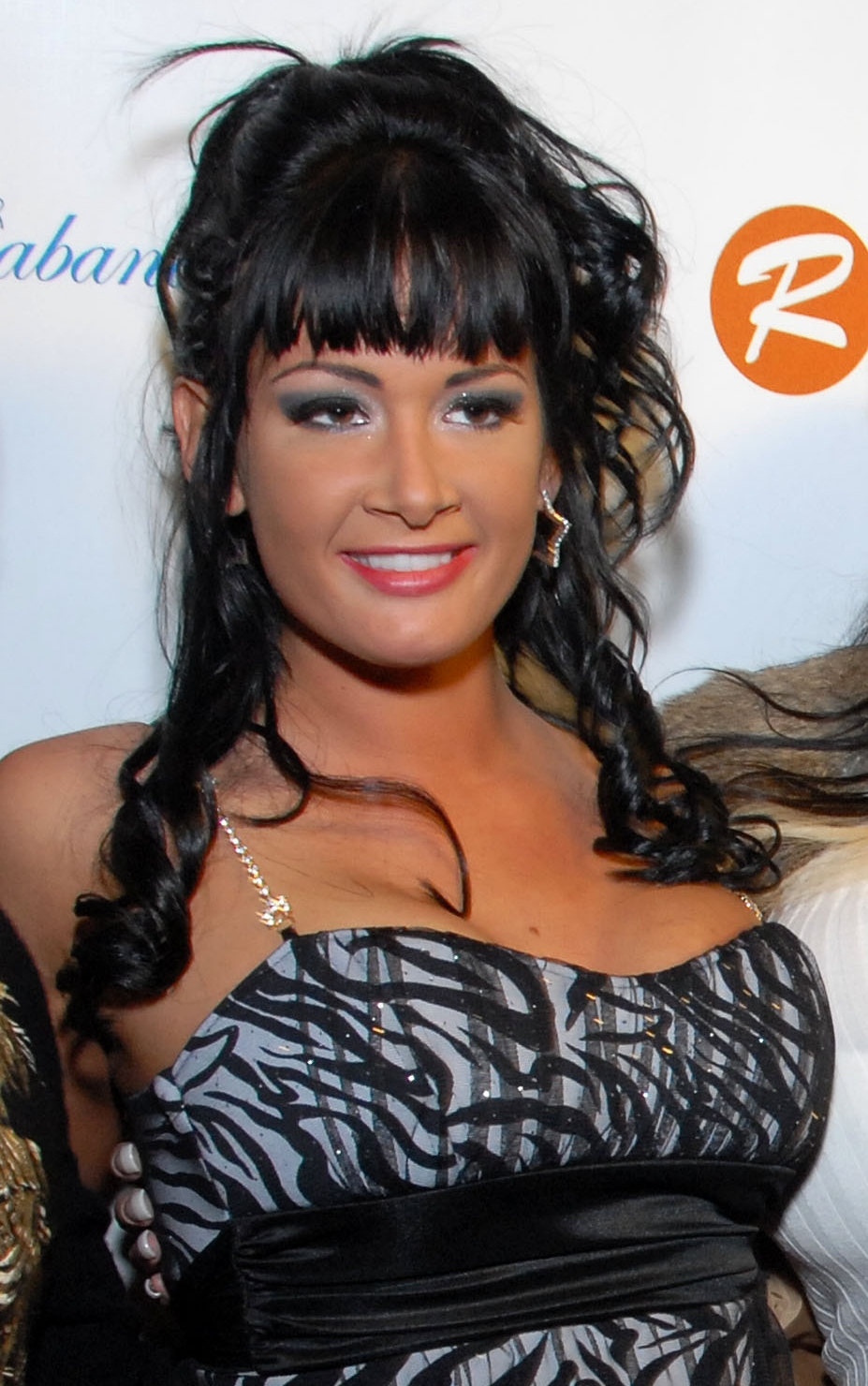
- Lane attending a fashion show at the Cabana Club in Hollywood, California in 2009
- Born: 1982 or 1983 (age 43–44); Schenectady, New York, U.S.
- Occupations: Fetish model; exotic dancer; pornographic film actress; pornographic film director
- Modeling information
- Height: 5 ft 6 in (1.68 m)

Tory Lane (born 1982 or 1983) is an American fetish model, exotic dancer, pornographic film actress, and pornographic film director. She was named among the top twenty pornographic film actresses at the 2007 Adultcon and has won two AVN Awards. In 2017, she was inducted into the AVN Hall of Fame.

== Early life and career ==
Lane was born in Schenectady, New York. She worked as a bartender at a club called The Elbo Room on Fort Lauderdale Beach. She also worked at a sex shop and as a stripper in local Florida strip clubs.

Lane started in the pornographic film industry after being scouted in Florida by Peter North, and she then flew out to California and signed with the then-new agency LA Direct Models. After signing with LA Direct Models, Lane's first scene in a pornographic film was with Ben English and Marco In May 2007, Lane signed a two-year contract with Sin City for both acting and directing. In 2006, Lane was a finalist on the second season of Playboy TV reality show Jenna's American Sex Star, but she lost the prize in the final round. She was inducted into the AVN Hall of Fame in 2017.

== Personal life ==
Lane is a personal friend of Jennifer Ketcham and features in her 2012 memoir I Am Jennie. Ketcham stated that Lane used the money she made in the industry to provide for her sister, extended family, and self and described her as "one of the few responsible girls in the biz".

== Awards ==
Year	Award	Category	Film
2007	Adultcon	Top 20 Adult Actresses	—N/a
2009	AVN Award	Best POV Sex Scene	Double Vision 2
2010	AVN Award	Best Group Sex Scene	2040
2017	AVN Award	AVN Hall of Fame	—N/a
