= The Thalians =

Charity in California, US

The Thalians is a charitable organization dedicated to mental health causes. It was founded by Hollywood actors in 1955, and takes its name from Thalia, Greek Muse of comedy and idyllic poetry.

Over 60 years, the Thalians held Annual Galas, honoring a Mr. or Ms. Wonderful with an award designed by Walt Disney. The coveted trophy is given to a member of the entertainment industry not only for their work on stage and screen but also for their behind-the-scenes philanthropy. A partial list of the honorees includes Frank Sinatra, Mary Martin, Lana Turner, Ed Sullivan, Shirley MacLaine, Gene Kelly, Sammy Davis Jr., Lucille Ball, Bing Crosby, Bob Hope, James Stewart, Rita Hayworth, Count Basie, Liza Minnelli, Carol Channing, Carol Burnett, Sally Field, Mary Tyler Moore, Whoopi Goldberg, Red Buttons, Clint Eastwood, Mickey Rooney, Kenny Rogers, Hugh Hefner, and Smokey Robinson.

They used to be connected with Cedars-Sinai Medical Center.

The Thalians current focus is the mental health of the military men and women and their families of UCLA Operation Mend. The President Emeritus of the organization was the late Debbie Reynolds. Current President is Kira Reed Lorsch; Past President: Debbie Reynolds; Chairman: Dr. Irwin Lehrhoff; Chairwoman Emeritus: Ruta Lee; Treasurer: Andrew McDonald; Recording Secretary: Stephanie J. Hibler; Board Members: Frank Sheftel, Brian Theobald, Barbara Cohen-Wolfe & Larry Wolfe, Patrika Darbo, David Snowden, Rico E. Anderson and George Pennacchio. The Board of Governors: William & Patricia Anton, Sandy Krause, Dr. Lawrence Piro, Jackie Rosenberg.

The Thalians library of documented Thalians Galas is being preserved at the Academy Film Archive.

It is headquartered in Mission Hills, California. The Thalians now mainly supports mental health programs for wounded military men and women and their families of UCLA Operation Mend.
