= Juli Ashton =

American pornographic film actress & television host

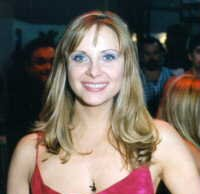
- Ashton in 2006
- Occupations: Pornographic film actress; television and radio personality

Juli Ashton is an American pornographic film actress and television personality.

== Adult film career ==
In 1994, she began appearing in adult films, starting with New Wave Hookers 4.

Ashton is the owner and operator of the adult website Juliland.com, a website that features the erotic imagery of photographer/director Richard Avery.

== Other ventures ==
As of 2003, Ashton co-hosted the sexuality-focused phone-in program Night Calls alongside Tiffany Granath. The programs were aired on the Playboy Channel and its offshoot Playboy Radio.

Ashton was the first spokesperson for Adam & Eve. It was during this period that she lobbied on behalf of the Free Speech Coalition at the California State Legislature. She was one of the first adult actresses to open her own adult film production company, known as Ashton View Promotions. In addition to her work in the adult film industry, Juli has credits in two computer games from 1996.

== Awards ==
- 1996 XRCO Award – Female Performer of the Year
- 1997 AVN Award – Best Supporting Actress—Video (Head Trip)
- 1997 Free Speech Coalition – Positive Image Award
- 2000 NightMoves Award – Best Actress (Editor's Choice)
- 2011 XRCO Hall of Fame
- 2012 AVN Hall of Fame
