= Kaylani Lei =

American pornographic actress

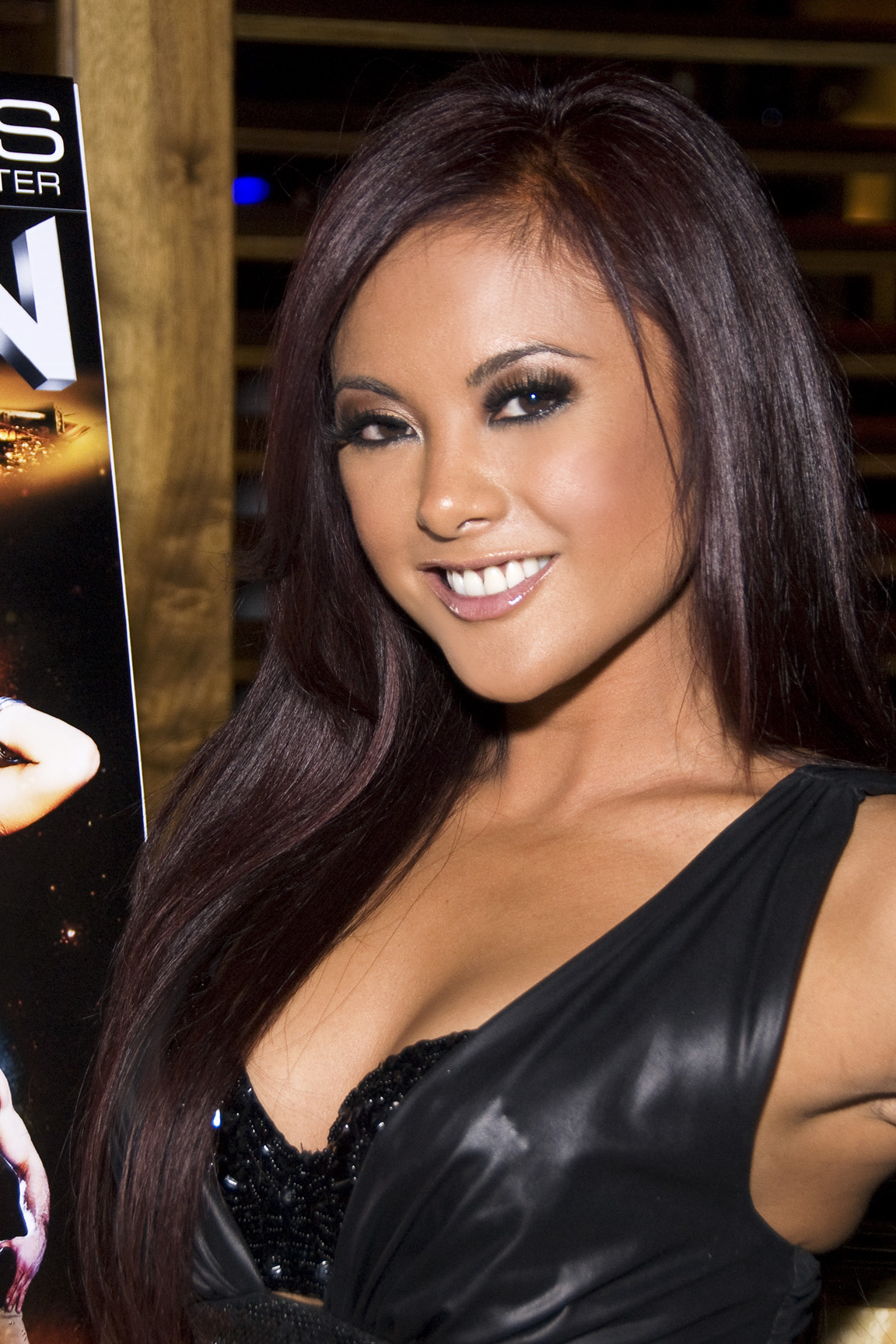
- Lei in 2011
- Born: Singapore
- Occupation: Pornographic film actress

Kaylani Lei is an American pornographic film actress.

== Early life ==
Lei was born in Singapore.

== Career ==
Outside of her adult film work, Lei has appeared on The Howard Stern Show, and she has made appearances on Playboy TV. In 2007, she was the co star of the Cinemax series The Erotic Traveler, as "Allison Kraft" – an apprentice erotic photographer.

In 2010, Lei appeared alongside fellow Wicked Pictures contract star Alektra Blue in the Free Speech Coalition's "All-Star Anti-Piracy PSA".

In 2011, Complex magazine ranked her at #24 in their list of "The Top 50 Hottest Asian Porn Stars of All Time".

== Personal life ==
Lei dated Byron Kelleher, a New Zealand rugby union halfback, from 2005 to 2006. She lived with him in New Zealand until June 2006.

== Awards and nominations ==
Year	Ceremony	Result	Category	Work
2004	AVN Award	Nominated	Best New Starlet	—N/a
2004	AVN Award	Nominated	Best Actress – Video	Angel X
2004	XRCO Award	Nominated	Best Girl/Girl Scene (with Asia Carrera)	Angel X
2004	XRCO Award	Nominated	New Starlet	—N/a
AVN Award	Nominated	Best Actress – Video	Sweatshop	
AVN Award	Nominated	Best Tease Performance	Smokin' P.O.V.	
AVN Award	Nominated	Best Oral Sex Scene – Video (with Charmane Star & Brad Armstrong)	Eye of the Beholder	
2007	AVN Award	Nominated	Best Supporting Actress – Video	Curse Eternal
2007	AVN Award	Nominated	Best Three-Way Sex Scene (with Jessica Drake & Eric Masterson)	Curse Eternal
2008	AFWG Award	Won	Porn Cumback of the Year	—N/a
2008	AVN Award	Nominated	Best Actress, Video	Candelabra
2008	NightMoves Award	Won	Best Female Performer (Editor's Choice)	—N/a
2008	XRCO Award	Won	Best Cumback	—N/a
2009	AVN Award	Nominated	Best Actress	The Wicked
2009	AVN Award	Nominated	Best Group Sex Scene (with Mikayla Mendez, Evan Stone, Sophia Santi & Barry Scott)	The Wicked
2009	XRCO Award	Nominated	Single Performance – Actress	The Wicked
2010	AVN Award	Nominated	Best All-Girl Group Sex Scene (with Alektra Blue, Jessica Drake, Kirsten Price & Mikayla Mendez)	House of Wicked
2010	AVN Award	Won	Best Group Sex Scene (with Jessica Drake, Kirsten Price, Alektra Blue, Mikayla Mendez, Tory Lane, Jayden Jaymes, Kayla Carrera, Randy Spears, Brad Armstrong, Rocco Reed, Marcus London, Mick Blue & T.J. Cummings)	2040
2011	AVN Award	Nominated	Best Group Sex Scene (with Misty Stone, Jessica Drake, Kirsten Price, Alektra Blue, Chanel Preston, Kayme Kai, Tory Lane, Briana Blair, Mick Blue, Dale DaBone, Barrett Blade, Eric Masterson, Marcus London, Sascha & Bill Bailey)	Speed
2012	AVN Award	Nominated	Best All-Girl Group Scene (with Jessica Drake, Alektra Blue & Brandy Aniston)	Sexy
2012	AVN Award	Nominated	Best Group Sex Scene (with Alektra Blue, Jessica Drake, Kirsten Price, Brandy Aniston, Nikki Daniels, Lucky Starr, Puma Swede, Randy Spears, Tommy Gunn, Marcus London, Ron Jeremy, Jack Vegas, Dick Chibbles, Rocco Reed & Mac Turner)	The Rocki Whore Picture Show: A Hardcore Parody
2013	AVN Award	Nominated	Best Actress	Snatched
2013	AVN Award	Nominated	Best All-Girl Group Sex Scene (with Asa Akira, Katsuni, Mia Lelani & Miko Lee)	Asian Anal Assassins
2013	XBIZ Award	Nominated	Best Actress—Couples-Themed Release	The Prize
2013	XBIZ Award	Nominated	Best Scene - Couples-Themed Release (with Xander Corvus)	The Prize
2013	XBIZ Award	Nominated	Best Supporting Actress	Countdown
2014	AVN Award	Nominated	Best Safe Sex Scene (with James Deen)	Hotel No Tell
2015	AVN Award	Won	AVN Hall of Fame	—N/a
2015	AVN Award	Nominated	Best Girl/Girl Sex Scene (with Abigail Mac)	The Masterpiece
2015	AVN Award	Nominated	Best Group Sex Scene (with Asa Akira, Aubrey Addams, Jessica Drake, Sarah Jessie, Vicki Chase, Brad Armstrong, Eric Masterson, Erik Everhard, Mr. Pete, Ryan McLane & Tyler Nixon)	Aftermath
2015	AVN Award	Nominated	Best Group Sex Scene (with Asa Akira, Samantha Saint, Summer Brielle, Sophia Fiore, Remy LaCroix, James Deen, Mr. Pete, Eric Masterson, Bill Bailey & Brad Armstrong)	Holly…Would
