= Reverse cowgirl =

Reverse cowgirl may refer to:

- Reverse cowgirl (sex position)
- "Reverse Cowgirl" (song), a 2010 song on T-Pain's album RevolveR
- "Reverse Cowgirl" (South Park), an episode from the sixteenth season of South Park
- Reverse Cowgirl, a 2020 book by McKenzie Wark
- The Reverse Cowgirl, a blog by Susannah Breslin
