= Brad Bufanda =

American actor (1983–2017)

- Born: Fred Joseph Bufanda III; May 4, 1983; Upland, California, U.S.
- Died: November 1, 2017 (aged 34); Los Angeles, California, U.S.
- Occupation: Actor
- Years active: 1994–2017

Brad Bufanda (born Fred Joseph Bufanda III; May 4, 1983 – November 1, 2017) was an American actor. He was known for his recurring role as Felix Toombs in the television series Veronica Mars, as well as his self-made Internet videos.

== Career ==
Bufanda began his professional acting career in 1994 starring in the independent action film Pocket Ninjas. He appeared on television the first time in 1994 as the Hero Boy in a Skechers commercial. At the age of 12 he starred in the ABC weekend special The Secret of Lizard Woman. While in middle school he appeared on the ABC series Roseanne and Hangin' with Mr. Cooper.

Bufanda later appeared in a number of television shows including CBS's CSI: Miami, Fox's Malcolm in the Middle, Disney Channel's Even Stevens, and NBC's soap opera Days of Our Lives. Bufanda portrayed Felix Toombs in the first two seasons of the series Veronica Mars. He starred in the Cinemax series Co-Ed Confidential (credited as Bradley Joseph) from 2008 to 2010, in addition to filming and editing the show's reunion.

Staying credited as Bradley Joseph, Bufanda appeared in the psychological thriller Dark Tourist in 2012. 2017 marked Bufanda's brief return to film with a supporting role in the action comedy Garlic & Gunpowder.

== Death ==
On November 1, 2017, Bufanda died by suicide at the age of 34 by jumping off of his residential tower in the Park La Brea apartment community of Los Angeles. According to the Los Angeles County Coroner's office, a suicide note was found at the scene. The note, which was found on or near his body, cited the names of his parents and thanked important people in his life.

== Filmography ==
=== Film ===
Year	Title	Role	Notes
1994	Pocket Ninjas	Steve	
1995	Little Lost Sea Serpent	Tommy Rockwell	Direct-to-video
2004	A Cinderella Story	David	
2004	Debating Robert Lee	Richard Alanzo	
2008	Stone & Ed	Carlos	
2012	Dark Tourist	Manny	
2017	Garlic & Gunpowder	Robert	
2018	Stan the Man	Cooper	Posthumous release

=== Television ===
Year	Title	Role	Notes
1995	ABC Weekend Specials	Todd Yazzi	Episode: "The Secret of Lizard Woman"
1995	Roseanne		Episode: "The Last Thursday in November"
1996	The Blackberry Inn	Bradley B	Unknown episodes
1996	Hangin' with Mr. Cooper	Darrin	Episode: "The Curse"
2001	Emeril	The boy	Episode: "Halloween"
2002	Even Stevens	Lloyd Offler	Episode: "Hutch Boy"
2002–2003	Days of Our Lives	Joe	5 episodes
2002	Dismissed	Brad (uncredited)	Episode: "Dismissed at the Circus"
2002	Birds of Prey	Tough kid	Episode: "Three Birds and a Baby"
2003	Malcolm in the Middle	Kid #2	Episode: "Long Drive"
2003	Miracles	Jay/Jock	Episode: "The Bone Scatterer"
2003	CSI: Miami	Brad Dawson	Episode: "The Best Defense"
2003	Boston Public	Cash	Episode: "Chapter Seventy-Two"
2004–2006	Veronica Mars	Felix Toombs	10 episodes
2005	Malcolm in the Middle	Luger Bob	Episode: "Dewey's Opera"
2008–2010	Co-Ed Confidential	Larry	Main role (seasons 2–4); 38 episodes
