= Key'mon Winkfield Murrah =

American operatic countertenor (born 1990)

- Born: January 20, 1990 (age 36); Louisville, Kentucky, US
- Education: University of Kentucky (BA)
- Occupation: Operatic countertenor
- Years active: 2018–present
- Relatives: Kay'mon Murrah (brother)
- Awards: Giulio Gari Vocal Competition (2023); International Hans Gabor Belvedere Singing Competition (2022); Operalia competition (2021)
- Website: Official website

Key'mon Winkfield Murrah ([ki'mon wɪŋkfiːld məˈrɑ]; born January 20, 1990) is an American countertenor singer. He has performed leading roles with many opera companies and concert venues, including Bavarian State Opera, the Metropolitan Opera, and the Los Angeles Opera.

== Education and career ==
He was born in 1990 in Louisville, Kentucky. After singing in the church choir as a child, at 9 years old, Murrah joined a boys choir of majority black students at the West Louisville Performing Arts Academy performing spirituals, jazz, and classical music across the country.

He began his classical music studies as a vocal major at the Youth Performing Arts School, a comprehensive magnet high school for the performing arts. In 2007 he attended the Kentucky Governor's School for the Arts. He received a bachelor's degree in Arts administration at the University of Kentucky.

== Awards ==
- 2nd place, Emerging Soloists Competition (2019)
- Semi-finalist, Metropolitan Opera Eric and Dominique Laffont Competition (2020)
- 1st Prize, Camille Coloratura Awards (2020)
- 2nd place, Rochester International Vocal Competition (2020)
- 1st-place winner, Houston Grand Opera Concert of Arias (2021)
- Grand prize Winner, Premiere Opera Foundation + NYIOP International Vocal Competition (2021)
- Encouragement Award/ Finalist, Operalia (2021)
- Grant Winner, Career Bridges (2021)
- Grant Winner, Sullivan Foundation (2022)
- 1st place Winner, International Hans Gabor Belvedere Singing Competition (2022)
- 1st place Winner, Giulio Gari Vocal Competition (2023)
- Marian Anderson Vocal Award (2024)
