= World of Playboy =

- Country of origin: United States

Production
- Running time: 30 mins

Original release
- Network: Playboy TV
- Release: 1999

World of Playboy is an adult infotainment newsmagazine currently airing on Playboy TV. It has produced over 100 episodes and functions as a monthly summary of current happenings within the Playboy brand.

== Format ==
Currently the longest-running program on Playboy TV, World of Playboy gives viewers various news and media updates regarding Hugh Hefner, The Girls Next Door, and former Playboy centerfolds. It also provides exclusive introductions to brand new Playmates about to appear in Playboy magazine.

Additionally, the show airs private footage from Playboy Mansion parties and company-related events.
