= Josh Arnold =

American comedian and radio personality

- Born: Joshua Matthew Arnold; May 16, 1978 (age 48); Fenton, Missouri
- Presenting career
- Show: The Bob & Tom Show
- Country: United States
- Website: www.thatjosharnold.com

Joshua Matthew Arnold (born May 16, 1978) is a radio personality and stand-up comedian who appears on The Bob & Tom Show. He is originally from Fenton, Missouri.

== Professional career ==
Arnold is a professional comedian and was named the best male comedian in the St. Louis area in 2011. Prior to becoming a comedian he worked for Rawlings and taught English in South Korea for almost two years.

=== The Bob and Tom Show ===
Arnold joined The Bob & Tom Show on August 1, 2016, replacing Scott Potasnik after several weeks of guest hosting. Arnold had made numerous appearances as a guest on the show prior to joining it.
