= Scott Potasnik =

American television personality (born 1975)

Scott M. Potasnik (born October 28, 1975) is an American journalist, television host, producer and actor. He was a host of Sexcetera, a travel adventure docu-series. Potasnik is also the co-creator and host of Too Much for TV, a pay per view travel show that aired on iNDEMAND, Host of the Splash News celebrity news pilot and creator and producer of Tokin' Trash, a pilot for Comedy Central. Potasnik has also served as director of production for Mantra Films, production coordinator for the MTV series Jackass, and a producer for MTV series The Lyricist Lounge Show.

Beginning in 2014, Scott could be heard on The Bob and Tom Show, a syndicated morning radio comedy program based in Indianapolis, Indiana. He was known as their "sex desk" correspondent and "fact checker." In 2016 Potasnik became a full-time member of the show with the retirement of Bob Kevoian. Sometime in July 2016 after the return of Kristi Lee, Potasnik and Pat Carlini disappeared without a trace from the show. It appears comedian Josh Arnold was hired to replace Potasnik.

== Early life ==
Scott Potasnik was born in Indianapolis, Indiana the son of Cynthia Edwards and Michael Potasnik. He attended Carmel High School and Ball State University.
