= Sin City (studio) =

American pornographic film studio

- Type: Private
- Industry: Pornography
- Founded: 1987; 39 years ago
- Defunct: 2013; 13 years ago
- Headquarters: United States
- Area served: Worldwide
- Products: Pornographic films
- Owner: David Sturman

Sin City was an American independent pornographic film studio, owned by David Sturman, the son of Reuben Sturman. David Sturman's son Jared was the general manager. In 2007 it signed a two-year exclusive contract with Tory Lane to perform in and direct films. In May 2008 it was announced that she had left her contract early.

== Awards ==
- 1993 AVN Award – Best Packaging (Film) – Sin City – The Movie
- 1994 AVN Award – Best Packaging (Video) – Hungry
- 1996 AVN Award – Best Gang Bang Tape – 30 Men For Sandy
- 1999 AVN Award – Best Actor (Film) – Models (James Bonn)
- 1999 AVN Award – Best Supporting Actor (Film) – Models (Michael J. Cox)
- 2000 AVN Award – Best Actor (Film) – Chloe (James Bonn)
- 2000 AVN Award – Best Actress (Film) – Chloe (Chloe)
- 2001 AVN Award – Best Editing (Film) – Watchers (Michael Raven and Sammy Slater)
- 2001 AVN Award – Best Screenplay (Film) – Watchers (Michael Raven and George Kaplan)
- 2001 AVN Award – Best Supporting Actor (Film) – Watchers (Randy Spears)
- 2001 AVN Award – Best Actor (Film) – Adrenaline (Evan Stone)
- 2001 AVN Award – Best All-Sex Film – Erotica
- 2001 AVN Award – Best Film – Watchers
- 2002 AVN Award – Best Actor (Film) – Beast (Anthony Crane)
- 2003 AVN Award – Best Supporting Actor (Film) – Paradise Lost (Mr. Marcus)
- 2003 AVN Award – Best Overall Marketing Campaign (Individual Title or Series) – Paradise Lost
- 2003 NightMoves Award – Best Film/Video (Editor's Choice) – Riptide
- 2003 NightMoves Award – Best Film/Video Company
- 2006 AFW Award – Best Fetish Series – Dementia
- 2007 AFW Award – Most Outrageous Movie – Sodom 2
- 2007 AVN Award – Best Continuing Video Series – Dementia
- 2008 AFW Award – Most Outrageous Movie – The Hitchhiker
