= Canoga Park (TV series) =

2007 American TV series

- Created by: Travis Draft; Nick Thomas
- Country of origin: United States
- Original language: English
- No. of seasons: 1
- No. of episodes: 13

Production
- Executive producers: Nick Thomas; Travis Draft
- Running time: 30 minutes

Original release
- Network: Playboy TV
- Release: November 9, 2007 – January 18, 2008

Canoga Park is a scripted Playboy TV comedy show set in a fictional adult movie studio called American Insertions.

== History ==
Created by Travis Draft and Nick Thomas, Canoga Park was a rated-R sitcom (think The Office meets Boogie Nights) that aired on Playboy TV.

The name Canoga Park is based on the real city of Canoga Park in California's San Fernando Valley. It was chosen as a reference to the area's reputation for housing numerous Adult film studios.

== Episodes ==
No.	Title	Directed by	Written by	Original release date
1	"Porn Star for a Day"	Unknown	Unknown	November 9, 2007
2	"All's Fair"	Unknown	Unknown	November 9, 2007
3	"The Fashion Show/Haute Cooter"	Unknown	Unknown	November 16, 2007
4	"The Evaluation"	Unknown	Unknown	November 16, 2007
5	"One Night in Our Guest Star"	Unknown	Unknown	November 23, 2007
6	"Judy's Comeback"	Unknown	Unknown	December 6, 2007
7	"Dirk's Rival"	Unknown	Unknown	December 13, 2007
8	"A Star Is Porn"	Unknown	Unknown	December 20, 2007
9	"No Retreat"	Unknown	Unknown	December 27, 2007
10	"Cinema-gration"	Unknown	Unknown	January 4, 2008
11	"Repossession"	Unknown	Unknown	January 11, 2008
12	"Power Trip"	Unknown	Unknown	January 18, 2008
13	"A Canoga Park Christmas/The Party's Over"	Unknown	Unknown	January 25, 2008
