= Brooklyn Kinda Love =

- Country of origin: United States
- No. of seasons: 1
- No. of episodes: 10

Production
- Running time: 30 mins

Original release
- Network: Playboy TV
- Release: 2011 – 2011

Brooklyn Kinda Love is an adult reality series which aired on Playboy TV. It was created by Joe and Harry Gantz, who had previously produced HBO's Taxicab Confessions. The series follows four real New York couples and their ongoing relationship struggles.

== Overview ==
The first of Playboy TV's new TV For 2 campaign, Brooklyn Kinda Love ushered a new wave of programming geared for both male and female viewers. Throughout the season, the series focused on four couples, all from differing types of relationships. It was said to be a reality series and even though producers may have suggested, or requested couples discuss certain pressing topics, arguments, or issues, the show in no way was scripted, and all cast dealt with real deal, everyday problems of theirs.
