= Money Talk =

Money Talk may refer to:

- "Money Talk", a 2016 song by T.I.
- "Money Talk", a 2020 song by Rich the Kid featuring YoungBoy Never Broke Again from Boss Man

== See also ==
- Money Talks (disambiguation)
