= Jodi Miller =

American actress

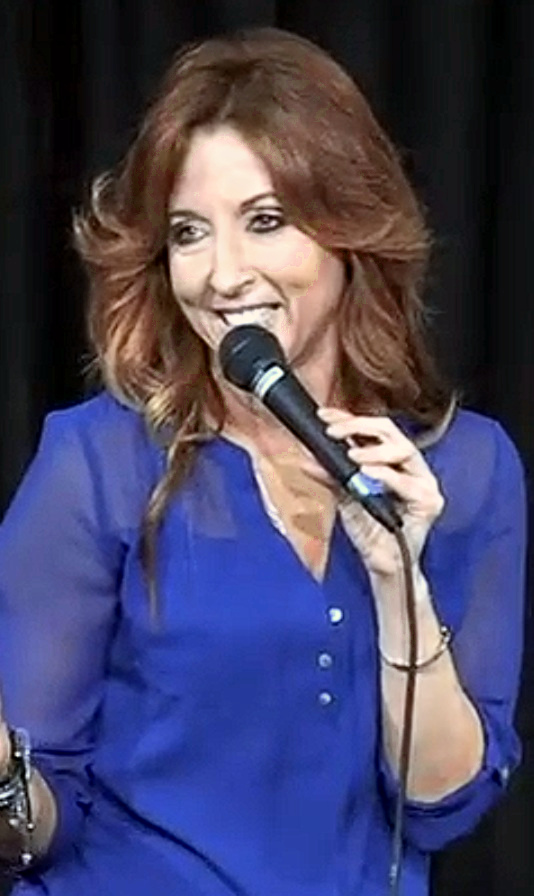
- Miller in 2015
- Born: May 8 Rockaway, New Jersey, U.S.
- Education: East Stroudsburg University
- Children: 1 (adopted)

Comedy career
- Medium: Stand-up
- Genre: Observational comedy
- Subjects: Relationships; gender; self-deprecation

Jodi Miller (born May 8) is an American stand-up comedian, writer, actress, executive producer and author known for appearing on the 9th season of America's Got Talent.

== Early life ==
Miller was born in Rockaway, New Jersey. She studied at East Stroudsburg University (ESU), Monroe County, Pennsylvania, graduating with a degree in Broadcast Journalism.

== Career ==
Miller has appeared as a reoccurring guest commentator on CNN's Showbiz Tonight, and as the host of the news parody show NewsBusted. She has performed on Comics Unleashed, The Tonight Show, Comedy Central, and Gotham Comedy Live.

She was a writer on the Cinemax series Co-Ed Confidential and is the co-author of the book series WTF with Gregory Bergman (WTF? College; WTF? Work; WTF? Women; SRSLY, WTF; WTF? America; and OMG! Guys).

In 2014, Miller auditioned for season nine of America's Got Talent.

On April 8, 2016, Miller released a comedy album entitled No Child Left Behind on iTunes. She is the Executive Producer of Comics Unleashed on the comic game show Funny You Should Ask on CBS and hosts the show The World's Funniest Weather.

== Personal life ==
In February 2021, she adopted a daughter named McKenzie Jack.
