= Around the World in 80 Babes =

- Country of origin: United States

Production
- Running time: 10 mins

Original release
- Network: Playboy TV
- Release: 2008

Around The World In 80 Babes is a collection of segments currently airing on Playboy TV that feature models and Playboy cover girls showing off various exotic cities across the globe.

== Format ==
Produced in 2008, the show features 18 different episodes of models giving tours of their home countries. The 10-minute segments have been featured as pieces in the Playboy Prime program and edited together to be stand-alone 30-minute shows.

Each Tour generally begins with a model introducing herself and showing off her home, followed by day trips to the city and nights out at the girl's favorite bar or club. Some of the cities profiled include Rio de Janeiro, New York City, London, and Mexico City.

Past Playboy cover model Amy Lynn Grover appeared in the Toronto segment and Elita Löfblad, contestant on Big Brother (Sweden and Norway), appeared in the Stockholm piece.
