= Andrea Lowell =

American actress and model

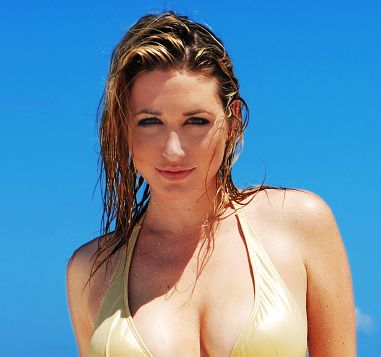
- Lowell in 2008

Andrea Lowell is an American actress and model.

== Career ==
Lowell was the co-host of The Playboy Morning Show on Playboy Radio.

On November 20, 2015, at World Series of Fighting 25 Lowell was a guest ring card girl.

== Personal life ==
Lowell attended the University of California, Irvine, where she pursued a degree in biology.

On December 29, 2009, Lowell married longtime boyfriend James Kim, who is of Korean descent, in a Buddhist tradition in Las Vegas.

== Filmography ==
Television
Year	Title	Role	Notes
1998–2005	Sexcetera	Herself	Reporter
2005–06	Totally Busted	Herself	Host
2006	The Surreal Life	Herself	
2007	The Surreal Life: Fame Games	Herself	
2010–16	The Playboy Morning Show	Herself	Host
2015	World Series of Fighting 25	Herself	Guest Ring Card Girl
2017	Below Deck Mediterranean	Herself	
