= Cheerleader Ninjas =

- Directed by: Kevin Campbell
- Written by: Kevin Campbell
- Produced by: Hamster Pictures
- Starring: Kira Reed; Angela Brubaker; Jeff Nicholson; Renee Deemer; T. Scott Becker; Jared Brubaker; Donr Sneed; Adam Burns; Matthew Mertz; Lee Schinagl; Tamara Lentz; Sunny Graves; Alissa Shanley; Cathryn Farnsworth; Brooke Martin
- Narrated by: Kevin Campbell
- Cinematography: Brendan C. Flynt
- Edited by: Kevin Campbell
- Music by: Derrick Boelter
- Distributed by: Trimark; Lions Gate Entertainment
- Release date: 14 June 2002
- Running time: 96 minutes
- Country: United States
- Language: English
- Budget: No budget film

Cheerleader Ninjas is a 2002 camp/action film directed by Kevin Campbell, starring Kira Reed, and from production company Control Track Productions. It predates the similarly named George Takei comedic vehicle Ninja Cheerleaders. In the film, the internet must be rescued from the control of a religious fanaticism group by four cheerleader ninjutsu students and their geek allies. The movie was filmed at Englewood High School.

== Plot ==
Four cheerleaders from the Happy Valley High Hamsters are blamed by a group of Church Ladies for the invasion of "Internet smut" into their children's bedrooms. The Church Ladies hire Stephen, a gay teacher from the local Parochial Reform School, to teach the cheerleaders a lesson by training a group of evil Catholic school girls.

In the other side, Mr. X, an evil mastermind is using the cheerleaders as guinea pigs to test his Internet Zombie Domination software. So the cheerleaders turn to their arch social enemies, the computer geeks, to help them learn Ninja abilities and defeat the evil Catholic Girls, Stephen and the mysterious Mr. X.

== Reception ==
Film Threat gave the film four stars, stating that the performances were "quite good, especially for the subject matter we’re dealing with". The Encyclopedia of Underground Movies found it more gory than funny.

== Remake ==
It is not to be confused with the 2008 feature Ninja Cheerleaders, starring George Takei.
