= Youth Performing Arts School =

High school in Kentucky, United States

Coordinates: 38°13′27.2″N 85°45′29.2″W

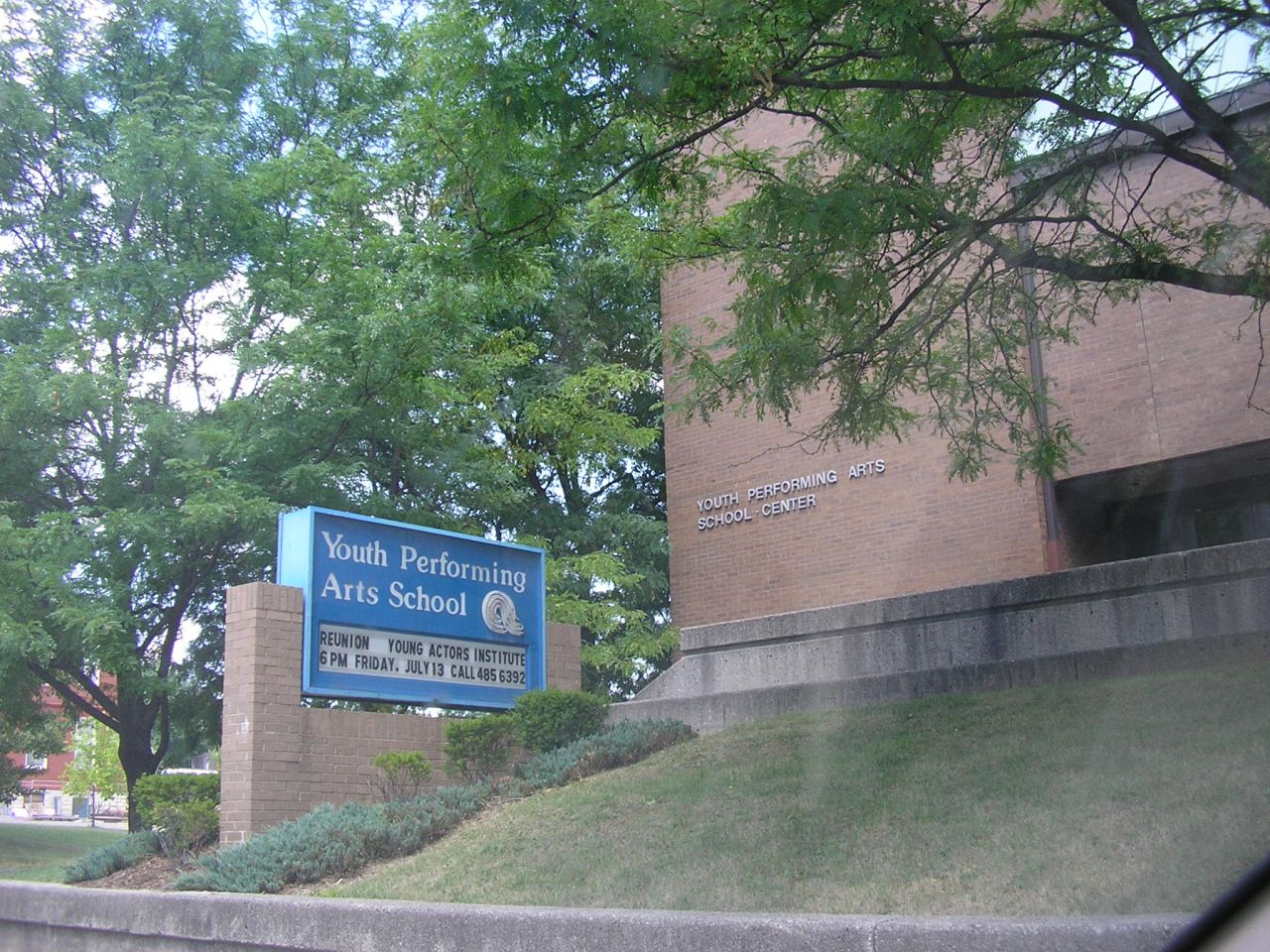
- Louisville, Kentucky

Information
- Website: https://www.jefferson.kyschools.us/o/ypas

The Youth Performing Arts School (YPAS) is a performing arts school in Louisville, Kentucky, United States, that concentrates on various vocal, instrumental, theatre, musical theatre and dance disciplines for high school students. Students who attend have no less than a ninety-minute block of arts studies each day (sometimes more), with the balance of their academic classes at duPont Manual High School. YPAS is one of only 100 U.S. schools of its type. Students are selected from within Jefferson County through a vigorous audition process. Annually, about 85% of student graduates attend major performing arts colleges.

YPAS offers the following majors: Design and Production, Vocal, Orchestra, Band, Piano, Guitar, Theater, Musical Theatre, and Dance.

== Notable alumni ==
- Chad Broskey (2005), actor
- Sean Cunningham, musician, singer
- Paige Davis (1987), theater performer, host of Trading Spaces on TLC from 2001 to 2005
- Sara Gettelfinger (1995), Broadway performer and film actress (Sex and the City)
- Sarah Hennies (1997), composer and percussionist
- Key'mon Winkfield Murrah, singer
- R. Prophet, rapper
- Kira Reed (1989), actress and television producer
- Nicole Scherzinger (1996), past member and lead singer of The Pussycat Dolls, actress, and Tony Award Winner.

== See also ==
- Public schools in Louisville, Kentucky
