= Kira Reed =

American actress, producer, television host

- Born: Santa Clara, California, U.S.
- Other name: Kira Reed Lorsch
- Education: Youth Performing Arts School; UCLA
- Occupations: Actress; television host; television writer; television producer
- Years active: 1992–present
- Spouses: Dan Anderson (m. 1997–2003) Robert Lorsch (m. 2008; died 2017)
- Website: kirareedlorsch.com

Kira Reed, also known as Kira Reed Lorsch, is an American actress, television host, television writer, and television producer.

== Early life ==
Reed was born in Santa Clara, California, and by the age of five was performing in school plays and local dance recitals. By the age of 10, she was doing commercials and local catalog modeling. When her family moved to Louisville, Kentucky, she attended the Youth Performing Arts School and then went on to graduate from UCLA's School of Theatre, Film and Television.

== Career ==
Kira Reed has appeared in numerous movies including starring roles in Red Shoe Diaries and The Price Of Desire, and on network television, on shows such as ER, NYPD Blue and The War at Home. She was a reporter and producer on Playboy TV's series Sexcetera, and was both a writer and supervising producer on Playboy's hit travel/reality show 69 Sexy Things 2 Do Before You Die. Reed has also worked as a reporter for the Hollywood Christmas Parade and was featured on Bravo Interior Therapy with Jeff Lewis with her husband Robert Lorsch.

She is president of The RHL Group, an event-production and entertainment company founded by Robert Lorsch, producing charity events, feature films and television programming. In December 2012, Reed's Score: How to Win the Girl of Your Dreams book was published. She has done SCORE book signing events in the US and in the UK in partnership with Hard Rock Cafe.

Reed joined the cast of the Emmy nominated The Bay in 2014 and its producing team soon thereafter. The drama series won a Daytime Emmy for Outstanding Drama Series - New Approaches in 2015 and Reed herself took home Emmys as a producer on the show in 2016 and 2017. In 2018, she received her first acting Emmy nomination as Outstanding Supporting Actress in a Digital Daytime Drama Series for her role of "Jo Connors" on The Bay. She was nominated for Best Actress for her portrayal of "Morgan" in the feature Acts of Desperation, and received a Lifetime Achievement award for her body of work in independent film at the 2019 New Vision International Film Festival. In 2020 Lorsch and The RHL Group joined forces with Pure Flix to executive produce the faith-based action thriller Beckman in which she starred as "Janice" alongside David A.R. White and William Baldwin. In Love on the Rock, shot in Malta during the pandemic for Sony/Pinnacle Peak Pictures, Kira co-stars again with David A.R. White and Steven Bauer. The RHL Group served as production company, and Kira executive produced and starred in the drama series Rumors as "Ellen" - acting teacher to young Hollywood. She took home the Indie Series Award for Best Supporting actress for her role. Rumors is now streaming on Prime Video. Kira joined the cast of Odd Man Out in 2023, completed the feature film Above the Break in 2025 and is starring in Winnie-the-Pooh: Blood and Honey 3 – The Lost Years. Reed will also appear alongside Aaron Eckhart and Brenton Thwaites in Out of the Ashes.

Reed's appearances in erotica included posing for Playboy Magazine in December 1996, and appearing in direct-to-video (DTV) movies like Secrets of a Chambermaid. In The Erotic Thriller in Contemporary Cinema, Linda Ruth Williams cited Reed and Delia Sheppard as examples of actresses who worked "...in B-scale erotic thrillers at the fringes of Hollywood, the obvious trajectory for a strip-circuit veteran (DTV divas Kira Reed and Delia Sheppard both started as showgirls.)" The book also reproduces a quote from an article at Playboy.com, with Williams again making specific reference to Reed. "Video may have killed the radio star, but it proved a real boon to Playmates in the Eighties, who played a not insignificant role in that decade's video revolution" Reed is featured in the 2023 documentary We Kill for Love about the lost genre of the direct-to-video erotic thriller.

== Personal life ==
Reed married Robert Lorsch (died 2017) in 2008. Kira Reed Lorsch served as president of the mental health organization The Thalians supporting programs for the wounded military men and women and their families of UCLA Operation Mend. She also supports Shelter Hope Pet Shop, a Thousand Oaks animal rescue group that puts dogs that might otherwise face euthanasia up for adoption instead. She appears as Ms. June in Shelter Hope's 2015 fundraising calendar. She also served on the Board of Trustees of California Science Center, home of the Robert H. Lorsch Family Pavilion and as a member of The Cedars-Sinai Board Of Governors (BOG). She is an ambassador for the mental health awareness campaign Imperfectly Perfect. She was profiled in Angeleno Magazine's "Dynamic Women of Los Angeles" 2018 and in "Icons Of Beverly Hills" in Modern Luxury Beverly Hills' Fall/Winter 2018-2019 issue as well as the 2020 Modern Luxury Hope Issue. Reed is spotlighted in the October 2021 issue of Riviera Magazine as an actress, producer, philanthropist, and luxury lifestyle wellness travel blogger. She was the inaugural recipient of the Icon Award for Women In Philanthropy presented at the 4th Annual Roger Neal Oscar Viewing Dinner, Icon Awards and Party. Reed is the cover model for the Winter 2022 issue of HIM Magazine.

== Filmography ==
=== Television ===
- Treacherous Crossing (1992) .... Passenger Sherilyn
- Beverly Hills, 90210 (1 episode, 1994) .... Dancing Girl
- Unsolved Mysteries (1 episode, 1996) .... Sara
- Beverly Hills Bordello (1 episode, 1996) .... Jenny Cochran
- Red Shoe Diaries (1 episode, 1996) .... Rita
- Perversions of Science (1 episode, 1997) .... Vampiress
- Click (2 episodes, 1997) .... Dominique
- Women: Stories of Passion (1 episode, 1997) .... Marlene
- Sexcetera (1998-2008) .... Reporter/Producer
- Ultimate Trek: Star Trek's Greatest Moments (1999) .... Salesgirl
- Ryan Caulfield: Year One (1 episode, 1999) .... Nadine
- Red Handed (1 episode, 1999) .... TV Host
- Strip Mall (1 episode, 2000) .... Auditioning Actress
- Madison Heights (1 episode, 2001) .... Susan
- The Howard Stern Show (2 episodes, 2001) .... Herself
- NYPD Blue (4 episodes, 2002) .... Gloria Simmons
- ER (1 episode, 2003) .... Shop Girl
- The War at Home (1 episode, 2006) .... Mrs. Petrusky
- Howard Stern on Demand (2 episodes, 2006–2010) .... Guest appearances
- The Daytime Emmy Awards (2009 - 2011) .... Backstage reporter
- Hollywood Christmas Parade (2009 -2014) .... Red Carpet Host/Reporter
- Chiller: 13 (2010) .... Commentator
- Today Show (2010) .... Herself
- Hero Dog Awards (2011) .... Reporter
- Hell's Kitchen (2011) .... Herself
- Money TV (7 Episodes, 2011 -2012) .... Commentator
- Interior Therapy with Jeff Lewis (2012) .... Herself
- CBS LA (2012-2013) .... Pets 2 Love Lady
- America's Newsroom (2013) .... Free Afridi Activist/Panelist
- Happening Now (2013) .... Herself
- Pit Boss (2013) .... Animal Rescue Advocate
- Fox and Friends (2013) .... Herself
- The Bay (2014-2018) .... Jo Connors
- The 411 (2016-17) .... Reporter/Producer
- The 44th Annual Daytime Emmy Awards (2017) .... Self-Winner
- Female Friendly (2018) .... The Madame
- Crystal: The Interview (2020) .... Linda
- Wild Wild Yogis (2020) .... Gwen
- Family Film Awards (2021) .... Self/Presenter/Winner
- Indie Series Awards (2022) .... Self/Presenter/Winner
- Good Day Live (2022-2023) .... Self/Special Guest
- Indie Series Awards (2023) .... Presenter
- Rumors (2024) .... Ellen
- Odd Man Out (2024-2025) .... Christi Selmons

=== Movies ===
- Mr. Saturday Night (1992) .... Beauty Pageant Contestant
- Maui Heat (1996) .... Sara
- Secret Places (1996) .... Holly
- Damien's Seed (1996) .... Carol
- The Lady in Blue (1996) .... Carla
- Fallen Angel (1997) (as Kira Lee) .... Kristi
- The Night That Never Happened (1997) .... Claire
- The Price of Desire (1997) .... Monica
- Madam Savant (1997) .... Suzy Largo
- Secrets of a Chambermaid (1997) .... Odile
- Too Good to Be True (1997/II) .... Darcy
- Losing Control (1997) .... Kim
- A Place Called Truth (1998) .... Kit
- Alien Files (1998) .... Agent Forrest
- Stigmata (1999) ....Stunt Double
- Shadow Dancer (1999) .... Janet
- Wasteland Justice (1999) .... Shanna
- Thriller: Caron (1999) .... Caron
- Luck of the Draw (2000) .... Zippo's Boudoir Girl
- Surrender (2000) .... Lauren
- Fast Lane to Malibu (2000) .... Officer Taylor
- House of Love (2000) .... Darby
- The Mistress Club (2000) .... Trudy
- Forbidden Highway (2001) .... Cherry
- Amy's Orgasm (2001, also known as Amy's O) .... Shannon Steele
- Rage of the Innocents (2001) .... Erica
- Demon Under Glass (2002) .... Chloe Martin
- Just Can't Get Enough (2002) .... Amber Lee
- Cheerleader Ninjas (2002) .... Fantasy Girl
- The Final Victim (2003) .... Nadia
- BachelorMan (2003) .... Courtney Love Wannabe
- Jailbait (2004) .... Nurse Jeri
- Demon's Claw (2006) .... Elizabeth Balthory
- Vampire (2010) .... Chloe
- Thalians 55th Anniversary Gala (2011) .... Host/Herself
- Thalians 56th Anniversary Gala (2014) .... Host/Herself
- This Is Our Christmas (2018) .... Mrs. Hawkins
- Acts of Desperation (2018) .... Morgan
- Beckman (2020) .... Janice
- Witches of Amityville Academy (2021) .... Sam
- Love on the Rock (2021) .... Stoll
- We Kill for Love (2023) .... Herself
- The Interview (2025) .... Linda
- Winnie-the-Pooh: Blood and Honey 3 – The Lost Years (2027) .... Karna
