= Dan Cummins =

American comedian and podcast host

- Born: May 17, 1977 (age 49); Riggins, Idaho, U.S.
- Education: Gonzaga University (BA)
- Occupations: Comedian, podcast host
- Spouse: Lynze Radzyminski (m. 2016)
- Children: 2

Dan Cummins (born May 17, 1977) is an American stand-up comedian and podcast host. His first comedy album, Revenge is Near, distributed by Warner Bros. Records, was ranked as one of the top 10 comedy CDs of 2009 by Punchline Magazine. His first hour-long special for Comedy Central, titled Crazy With A Capital F, premiered May 29, 2010. He was a co-host for The Playboy Morning Show and hosts multiple podcasts: Timesuck, since 2016; Scared to Death, with his wife Lynze, since 2019; and Is We Dumb with Joseph Paisley, which ran from 2020 to 2022.

== Early life and education ==
Cummins was born and raised in Riggins, Idaho. He graduated from Salmon River High School in 1995 and earned a Bachelor of Arts in psychology from Gonzaga University in Spokane, Washington. He then worked at a residential treatment center as a child and family counselor for six months, which he described as a horrible experience.

== Career ==
=== Comedy ===
In 2000, Cummins performed at the open mic of the now-defunct Laugh’s Comedy Cafe inside the Season Ticket bar near the Spokane Arena. In 2001, Cummins entered the Seattle Comedy Competition, finishing as runner-up. There he met David Crowe, with whom he formed a two-man stand-up and variety act, COBDOG, (Crowe On Bass, Dan On Guitar), the highlight of which was having a radio-friendly version of one of their sketches, titled "At The Coffee Shop," making The Bob & Tom Show best-of CD, Bob And Tom Gone Wild. The duo split in 2003.

In 2005, Cummins performed at the New Faces showcase at the Just For Laughs Montreal Comedy Festival, catching the attention of both Comedy Central and The Late Late Show talent booker. In 2006, Cummins performed on Comedy Central’s Live at Gotham, his first performance recorded for television. A month later, he made his network television debut, performing on The Late Late Show with Craig Ferguson. Also, in 2006, he performed at his second major festival, the HBO Las Vegas Comedy Festival. The year 2007 started off with Cummins performing at the Comedy Central South Beach Comedy Festival, and then booking approximately 100 college dates at the NACA Nationals college booking convention in Nashville. Cummins then recorded his first television stand-up special, Comedy Central Presents Dan Cummins, in August at the Hudson Theater in New York City. In 2008, Cummins performed at nearly 100 schools and also advanced to the semi-finals of Last Comic Standing, Season 6.

In 2009, Dan’s Comedy Central Presents was voted third favorite by fans in Comedy Central’s annual Standup Showdown. Shortly after, Comedy Central bought the rights to air a one-hour special. On October 17, 2009, in front of a sold-out audience at the Bing Crosby Theater in Spokane, Washington, Cummins recorded his first one-hour Comedy Central special, Crazy With A Capital F. Its initial showing on Comedy Central aired May 29, 2010. The accompanying CD was released on May 25, 2010; the DVD version was released on June 8, 2010.

Later in June 2009, Cummins performed at the second-annual Rooftop Comedy Aspen Comedy Festival. He made two additional television appearances in 2009, appearing on an episode of Byron Allen’s Comedy.TV, and on The Tonight Show with Conan O'Brien the day before Thanksgiving. The year 2009 also included the release of Cummins' first nationally distributed CD, Revenge is Near, on June 23 via Warner Brothers Records. It peaked at No. 7 on the Billboard Comedy Charts, and Punchlinemagazine.com put it in their top 10 list for the best comedy CDs of 2009.

In 2010, Cummins appeared in season two of G4’s The International Sexy Ladies Show, and has moved to Santa Monica, California, where he began working with Creative Artists Agency. Cummins also attempted to produce several television projects. Since early-2009, filmmaker Mike Newman has been filming an ongoing documentary on Cummins’ stand-up career.

Cummins opened for Los Angeles-based recording artist Hughie Stone Fish on the "Siren Songs" tour in September 2014.

=== Podcasting ===
On January 5, 2015 it was announced that Cummins would take over permanent co-hosting duties on The Playboy Morning Show. On September 18, 2016, Cummins released the first episode of his comedic/historical podcast “Timesuck”. On September 18, 2019, Cummins released the first episode of his second podcast, “Scared to Death”. Cummins was the first comic chosen to be spotlighted by Pandora Radio.

== Personal life ==
Cummins has two children, a son and a daughter with his former wife, whom he divorced in 2009. Cummins shares custody of his children, who split time between Spokane, Washington and Coeur d'Alene, Idaho. Cummins married Lynze Radzyminski, a costume designer and wardrobe assistant, in August 2016.

== Stand-up releases ==
- Comedy Central Presents Dan Cummins (2008)
- Revenge is Near (2009)
- Crazy With A Capital F (2010)
- Hear This (2012)
- Chinese Affection (2015)
- Don't Wake the Bear (2016)
- Maybe I’m the Problem (2018)
- Feel the Heat (2018)
- Get Out of Here; Devil (2020)
- Trying to get better (2023)
