= Matthew Randazzo V =

American true crime writer and historian

- Born: March 13, 1984 (age 42); New Orleans, Louisiana, U.S.
- Occupations: Writer and historian
- Spouse: Melissa Randazzo

Matthew Randazzo V (born March 13, 1984) is an American true crime writer and historian originally from New Orleans, Louisiana, who currently lives on the Olympic Peninsula of Washington. Randazzo is of Sicilian-American, Isleño and Cajun descent. He is the author of Ring of Hell: The Story of Chris Benoit & The Fall of the Pro Wrestling Industry (2008), co-author with Kenny "Kenji" Gallo of the Phoenix Books release Breakshot: A Life in the 21st Century American Mafia (2009) and author with the gangster Frenchy Brouillette of Mr. New Orleans: The Life of a Big Easy Underworld Legend (2010), which claims to be the first book to break the code of secrecy in the New Orleans Mafia family. Breakshot was republished in 2010 by the Simon & Schuster imprint PocketBooks.

== Film and TV adaptations ==
Two of Randazzo's books have been purchased for television and film adaptation. Breakshot: A Life in the 21st Century American Mafia was optioned by producer Henrik Bastin and sold to Fox Broadcasting Company for development as a weekly hour-long dramatic series with the Oscar winner Robert Moresco attached as producer/screenwriter.

== Bibliography ==
- Ring of Hell: The Story of Chris Benoit & The Fall of the Pro Wrestling Industry (Phoenix Books and Audio, 2008) ISBN 1-59777-579-7
- Breakshot: A Life in the 21st Century American Mafia with Kenny "Kenji" Gallo (Phoenix Books and Audio, 2009) ISBN 1-59777-615-7
- Mr. New Orleans: The Life of a Big Easy Underworld Legend with Frenchy Brouillette (Phoenix Books and Audio 2009 / Simon & Schuster 2010) ISBN 1-59777-616-5
