= The Surreal Life: Fame Games =

- Created by: Mark Cronin
- Presented by: Robin Leach
- Starring: Emmanuel Lewis; Traci Bingham; Ron Jeremy; Rob 'Vanilla Ice' Van Winkle; Brigitte Nielsen; Joanie 'Chyna Doll' Laurer; Sandy 'Pepa' Denton; C.C. DeVille; Andrea Lowell; Verne Troyer; Jordan Knight
- Theme music composer: C. C. DeVille
- Composer: Adam Zelkind
- Country of origin: United States
- Original language: English
- No. of seasons: 1
- No. of episodes: 10

Production
- Executive producers: Cris Abrego; Mark Cronin; Ben Samek; Jill Holmes; Jeff Olde
- Cinematography: Andrew Oliver
- Running time: 60 minutes (including commercials)

Original release
- Network: VH1
- Release: January 8 – March 25, 2007

Related
- The Surreal Life

The Surreal Life: Fame Games is an American reality television series originally broadcast on the VH1 cable network. A spin-off of the VH1 show, The Surreal Life, the show assembled ten alumni of the show's six prior seasons to compete in a ten-week competition that takes place in Las Vegas, with the winner taking home a prize of $100,000 provided by the online gaming site Golden Palace.net. Robin Leach was the host. The contestants also competed in a game show format elimination round in each episode called "Back to Reality" that saw the losers, in the first three weeks of the competition, sent to "the B-List" which consisted of living in a less luxurious wing of the mansion than the rest of the housemates, who were designated as "the A-List". In the later weeks, when the teams were split evenly, they competed in team competitions where the losing team must send three members to play "Back to Reality" to eliminate one person from the competition entirely.

The show featured a theme song titled "I Wanna Be Famous" recorded by cast member C.C. Deville from his album Samantha 7.

== Contestants ==
| Player | Original season | Finish |
|---|---|---|
| Traci Bingham | Season 2 | Winner |
| Ron Jeremy | Season 2 | Runner-up |
| Pepa | Season 5 | Finalist |
| Vanilla Ice | Season 2 | Finalist |
| Verne Troyer | Season 4 | Episode 9 |
| Andrea Lowell | Season 6 | Episode 8 |
| Chyna | Season 4 | Episode 7 |
| Emmanuel Lewis | Season 1 | Episode 6 |
| C.C. DeVille | Season 6 | Episode 5 |
| Brigitte Nielsen | Season 3 | Episode 4 |
| Jordan Knight | Season 3 | Episode 1 |

== Game summary ==
| Fame Gamers | 1 | 2 | 3 | 4 | 5 | 6 | 7 | 8 | 9 | 10 | | |
|---|---|---|---|---|---|---|---|---|---|---|---|---|
| Andrea | Rob | Rob | Rob | Rob | Traci | Ron | Rob | Verne | Ron | Traci | Traci | Traci |
| Brigitte | Ron | Andrea | Andrea | Andrea | Verne | Andrea | Andrea | Traci | Rob | Ron | Ron | Ron |
| C.C. | Traci | C.C. | C.C. | C.C. | Emmanuel | Pepa | Pepa | Pepa | Traci | Pepa | Pepa | |
| Chyna | Pepa | Pepa | Ron | Ron | Chyna | Rob | Ron | Rob | Pepa | Rob | | |
| Emmanuel | Brigitte | Ron | Pepa | Pepa | Rob | Traci | Traci | Ron | Verne | | | |
| Pepa | C.C. | Emmanuel | Emmanuel | Emmanuel | Andrea | Chyna | Verne | Andrea | | | | |
| Rob | Emmanuel | Traci | Traci | Traci | Pepa | Verne | Chyna | | | | | |
| Ron | Andrea | Brigitte | Brigitte | Chyna | Ron | Emmanuel | | | | | | |
| Traci | Verne | Verne | Verne | Verne | C.C. | | | | | | | |
| Verne | Chyna | Chyna | Chyna | Brigitte | | | | | | | | |
| Winning Team | N/A | N/A | N/A | A-List | B-List | A-List | N/A | N/A | N/A | N/A | N/A | N/A |

Legend

The Fame Gamer won the Competition
The Fame Gamer is in the B-list
The Fame Gamer is in the A-list
The Fame Gamer was Eliminated
The Fame Gamer won the Reward Challenge
The Fame Gamer was sent to "Back to Reality"
The Fame Gamer quit the Competition

Notes

- In Episode 1, Jordan Knight went home due to the death of his grandmother and he was replaced by Verne Troyer.
- In Episode 6, the A-List and The B-list teams were no longer used and it became an individual competition.
- In Episode 7, the Fame Gamers who were in the bottom three are not sent to "Back to Reality", but instead, the person with the fewest points was instantly eliminated.

== Episodes ==
| No. | Title Challenge | Challenge Winner | Back to Reality | Contestants (Loser in bold) | Original release date |
|---|---|---|---|---|---|
| 1 | "Welcome To Celebrity Island" "Celebrity Autograph" | Rob Van Winkle | Grab Bag | Andrea Lowell, **Chyna Doll** and **Verne Troyer** (Sent to The B-List) | January 8, 2007 |
Random audience members were asked of which star they would most like to meet and get their picture taken with. The three celebrities with the lowest number of fans lost.
| 2 | "Sex, Size, and Videotape" "Scandal Video" | Rob Van Winkle and Andrea Lowell | What's Charo Saying? | Emmanuel Lewis, **Traci Bingham** and **Brigitte Nielsen** (Sent to The B-List) | January 15, 2007 |
Teams of two had to make a scandalous video that lasted no more than 30 seconds. The team that won chose the next three celebrities to play back to reality.
| 3 | "Down and Out on the B-List" "Green Screen" | Rob Van Winkle | "Celebrity and Child Mash-Up" | CC Deville, Ron Jeremy and **Emmanuel Lewis** (Sent to The B-List) | January 22, 2007 |
Each team was given a script to memorize and then perform in front of a green screen. The three celebrities that did the worst acting jobs lost.
| 4 | "The Chyna Doll Syndrome" "Hotel Trash" | A-List | Surreal Connections | Chyna Doll, Brigitte Nielsen and **Verne Troyer** (Originally eliminated from the show, but Brigitte Nielsen offered to eliminate herself.) | January 29, 2007 |
Both teams had identical "hotel rooms" to trash. Whichever team trashed their hotel room more won the challenge. The losing team sent three players back to reality.
| 5 | "V for Variety" "Variety Show" | B-List | Celebrity Go Fish | Ron Jeremy, Pepa Denton and **CC Deville** (Eliminated) | February 11, 2007 |
Both teams had to put on a variety show for a live audience. The team that got the loudest applause won the challenge. The losing team sent three players back to reality.
| 6 | "Pretty Women" "Hooker Challenge" | A-List | The Real Bling | Verne Troyer, Chyna Doll and **Emmanuel Lewis** (Eliminated) | February 18, 2007 |
"" — Each team had to choose out of a large group of hookers and club dancers only fifteen girls. whichever team had the fewest hookers in their fifteen choices won. The losing team sent three players back to reality.
| 7 | "Dial M for Mommy" "Surreal Life Telethon" | Rob van Winkle | None | **Chyna Doll** (Eliminated) | March 4, 2007 |
Each celebrity had to call as many famous people as they knew. Out of the people called, 50 were selected as the top 50. Players then received points based on if someone they called made the top 50 list. For instance, if Jim Carrey was ranked 40, the player who called him received 10 points. The person who received the fewest points was instantly eliminated.
| 8 | "Peeping Toms" "Paparazzi" | Verne Troyer | Gourmet or Garbage? | Ron Jeremy,Rob van Winkle, **Andrea Lowell** | March 11, 2007 |
The teams were sent to a resort for a day of relaxation, however, they didn't know that it was a secret challenge, in which paparazzi snapped scandalous shots of the Fame Gamers. The three celebrities with the worst photos would go to Back to Reality.
| 9 | "Five Weasly Pieces" "Fan Challenge" | Ron Jeremy and Rob Van Winkle | Fill in the ____ing Blank | Pepa, Traci Bingham and **Verne Troyer** | March 18, 2007 |
The remaining contestants were attached to one of their fans. However, they had to stay attached no matter what, and separating would let an alarm go off, thus eliminating them from the game.
| 10 | "The Ice Ice Storm" "Commercial Making" | Traci Bingham | Stick it in Google | TBA | March 24, 2007 |
The contestants had To Make A Commercial For Golden Gaming Palace.Net.The Contestant Who Made the best Commercial Won. Back to Reality 1 (Contestants vote for the person they want to go home...majority vote goes home) Contestants: Ron Jeremy, Pepa, **Rob Van Winkle** Back to Reality 2 Contestants: Ron Jeremy and **Pepa** Final Two: Traci Bingham and **Ron Jeremy**

| Place | Name | Photos |
|---|---|---|
| 1 | Vanilla Ice | 6 |
| 2 | Traci Bingham; Ron Jeremy | 4 |
| 3 | Brigitte Nielsen; Pepa; C. C. DeVille; Emmanuel Lewis | 3 |
| 4 | Andrea Lowell; Verne Troyer | 2 |
| 5 | Chyna | 1 |

== See also ==
- List of television shows set in Las Vegas
