= Kenny Gallo =

American gangster

- Born: 1968 (age 57–58); Orange County, California, U.S.
- Occupations: Convicted gangster, author, blogger, FBI informant, director
- Spouse(s): Tabitha Stevens (divorced) Anne Kaneko (m. 2014)
- Website: http://www.betterlivedlives.com

Kenny "Kenji" Gallo (born 1968) is a Japanese-Italian American gangster-turned-informant, a former director and producer of adult films and an author.

A convicted narcotics dealer on the West Coast associated with the Los Angeles crime family and New York City's Colombo crime family, Gallo became an informant against such mafiosi as alleged Colombo crime family heir apparent Theodore "Teddy" Persico Jr. His memoir Breakshot: A Life in the 21st Century American Mafia, co-authored with Matthew Randazzo V, was published in August 2009 by Phoenix Books, and the co-owner of the Breakshot Blog.

== Criminal career and life as an informant ==
Gallo was born into a family of mixed Japanese and Italian descent in the Boyle Heights neighborhood of Los Angeles and raised in a middle-class neighborhood in Orange County. His father was interned at Minidoka during World War II, and became a successful magazine publisher after the war. Despite being an intelligent student, Gallo had behavioral issues at school, and after his parents divorced, his stepfather had him sent to military school in Carlsbad at the age of 13. Gallo was bullied by older students at the military school, and he later wrote that the experience taught him "to enjoy hurting people" and that "man should use any means at his disposal without hesitation to obtain dominance over everyone he meets". Gallo's father later had him removed from the military academy and enrolled him at University High School in Irvine. The actor Will Ferrell was among Gallo's classmates at University High.

Following the death of convicted hitman Charles Harrelson, Gallo was interviewed and identified in the Sunday 2007 issue of The Sunday Times as a "convicted Mafia associate" and friend of Harrelson.

== Film career ==
An adult film and B-movie director and producer from the late 1980s to the early 2000s, he directed twenty-nine adult films. While a filmmaker, Gallo met and married adult entertainment star Tabitha Stevens.

== Bibliography ==
- Breakshot: A Life in the 21st Century American Mafia with Matthew Randazzo V (Phoenix Books 2009) ISBN 1-59777-615-7
