= Breakshot =

2009 true crime memoir

- Author: Kenny Gallo
- Language: English
- Genre: True crime, Biography
- Publisher: Phoenix Books
- Publication date: August 2009
- English publication date: August 2009
- Media type: Print (paperback, hardcover)
- Pages: 383 pp (Hardcover ed)
- ISBN: 978-1597776158

Breakshot: A Life in the 21st Century American Mafia is an American memoir by Kenny "Kenji" Gallo, a former member of the Colombo Crime Family and The Milano Brothers who became an informant in the federal witness protection program. The book, which was titled after the undercover code name the FBI gave him, was released by Phoenix Books in August 2009, with co-writer Matthew Randazzo V.

== Storyline ==
The book is a story of life as a criminal and mafia associate. Breakshot includes Gallo's efforts to solve the 1987 murder of Joe Avila, a local restaurateur in Orange County, California, who was also said to be one of OC's biggest cocaine dealers in the 1980s.

After years in the mob, Gallo turned informant and wore an undercover wire against New York's Colombo and Lucchese Mafia Families, as well as the Milano family, in exchange for a fresh start in life via the witness protection program.

== Lawsuits ==
Gallo filed a lawsuit in 2011 against Phoenix Books for publishing his autobiography Breakshot: A Life in the 21st Century American Mafia without a contract, taking his copyright, and selling the paperback rights to Simon & Schuster without his permission and without paying him. The suit was settled, according to Courthouse News Service.

In February 2014, Gallo filed a second lawsuit, this one against Simon & Schuster, claiming that Simon & Schuster stole rights to his autobiography by registering the copyright under his co-author's and former publisher's names.

== Critical reception ==
Publishers Weekly wrote, in a starred review, "Crammed with the kind of characters and detail that make pages turn and moviemakers salivate, self-described 'mobster, drug lord, and porn kingpin,' Gallo's story of life as a criminal and Mafia associate is tantalizing material."

Blogcritics, in a November 2009 review by Scott Deitche wrote, "Breakshot joins the canon of better Mafia books, and among the subgenre of Mafia tell-alls, it's one of the strongest in recent years".

The OC Weekly wrote that the book "sheds new light on Newport Beach’s dark past as a haven for Italian mobsters and Colombian cartel figures."

== TV adaptation ==
In 2011, Breakshot was optioned by producer Henrik Bastin and sold to Fox Broadcasting Company for development as a weekly hour-long dramatic series with Robert Moresco as producer/screenwriter.
