= Naughty Amateur Home Videos =

- Starring: Vikki Ikki, Daisy de la Hoya
- Country of origin: United States
- No. of episodes: 142

Production
- Running time: N

Original release
- Network: Playboy TV
- Release: 1996 – 2008

Naughty Amateur Home Videos (also known as NAHV) is an adult reality television series currently in its 15th season on Playboy TV. It is hosted in-studio by reality television star Vikki Vikki. Daisy de la Hoya now serves as co-host, interviewing crowds and people on the street.

== Premise ==
Since 1996, Naughty Amateur Home Videos has continued to be one of Playboy TV's most popular shows. The most recent seasons have been based around host Jesse Jane and her trips to multiple cities across the United States. In between irreverent sexually charged man on the street interviews, viewers are shown actual amateur home movies of people from across the country engaging in sexual activity.

Beginning with the 15th season, the format has been changed to include one in-studio host (Vikki Ikki) and an "on the street" girl (Daisy de la Hoya) for crowd reactions and viewer feedback. In previous seasons, episodes had focused on themes relating to different geographic regions of the country. Now shows are centered on various fetishes, sexual positions, and types of women (MILFs, blondes, etc.).

Beginning on June 12, 2010, Naughty Amateur Home Videos (with new a new logo and graphics) has been added to Playboy TV's couples-centric, "Date Night" schedule.
