= Charmane Star =

Pornographic actress and model (born 1979)

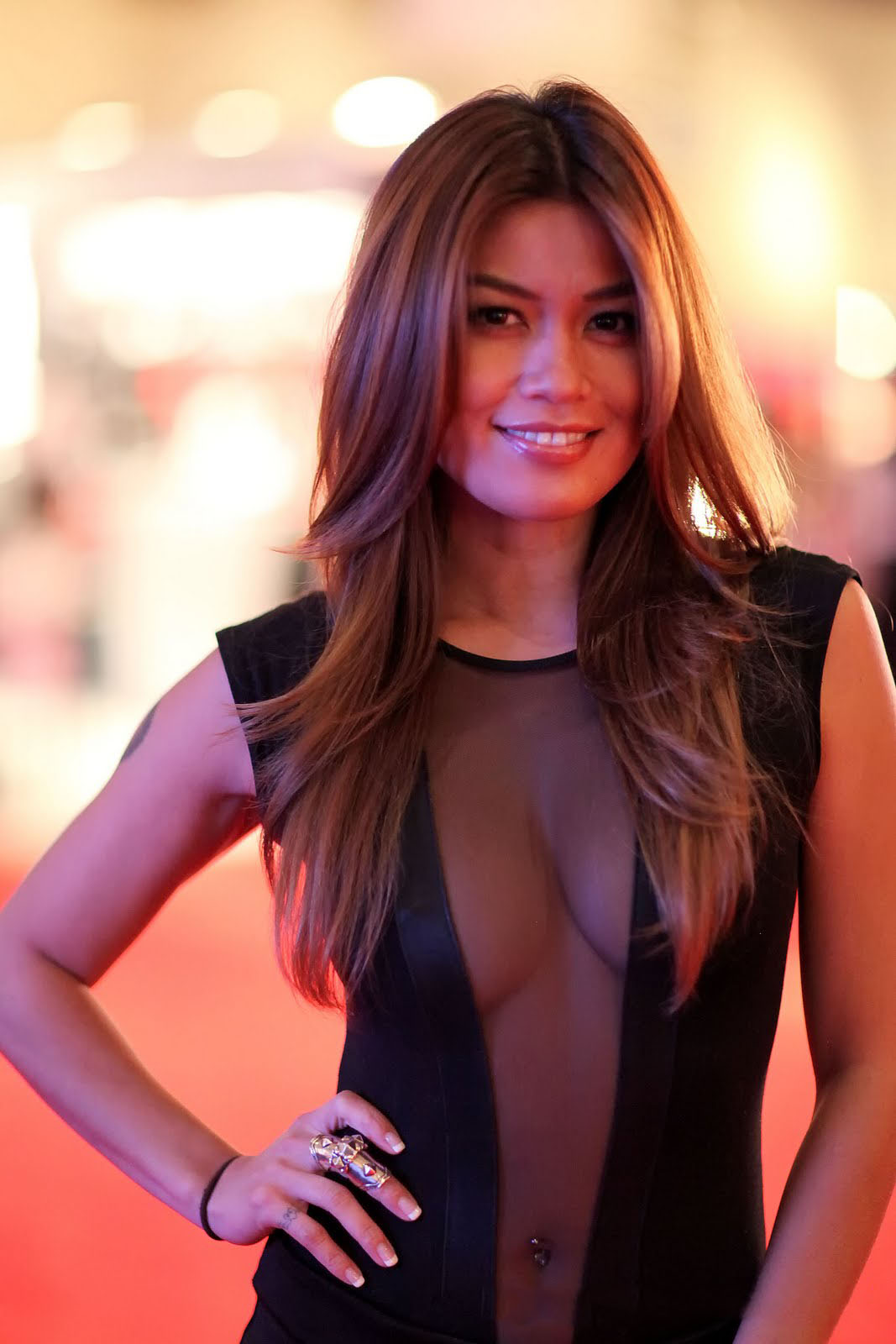
- Star from the Everything to do with Sex Show in Toronto, Ontario, Canada, November 2012
- Born: Sheryn Santos Lascano; May 5, 1979 (age 47); Philippines
- Other names: Carmane Star, Charmain, Charmain Star, Charmaine, Charmaine Star, Charmane, Charmane Starr, Charmane Summer
- Years active: 1998-2016
- Website: www.charmanestar.com

Charmane Star (born May 5, 1979) is a Filipino American pornographic actress who has appeared in over 300 films since 1998. She has also performed as a feature dancer and an automobile model.

== Early life ==
Star moved to the U.S. (California) with her family from the Philippines when she was less than two years old, and she went to high school in Sacramento.

== Career ==
Star started in print modeling, but, in 1998 at the age of 19, she started in the adult industry.

She has appeared in both Hustler and Club magazines including in The Girls of Penthouse in May/June 2014.

In 2011, Complex magazine ranked her at #8 in their list of “The Top 50 Hottest Asian Porn Stars of All Time.”

=== Mainstream appearances ===
Star and several other adult film actresses appear in the 2009 blaxploitation film Black Dynamite as one of Black Dynamite's "Ladies of Leisure". In a 2008 interview, Black Dynamite director Scott Sanders stated that these adult film actresses were cast in the film because they had not undergone any plastic surgery or enhancements and therefore fit into the 1970s theme.

Star has appeared on TV show Night Calls in 2005 and 2006, Zane's Sex Chronicles in 2010, Co-Ed Confidential in 2009–10, and in the 2014 horror movie Face of Evil.

She starred in the music video for the 2009 song "That's How I Go" by Baby Bash featuring Lil Jon and Mario.

== Awards ==
- 2017 AVN Hall of Fame inductee
