= The Playboy Morning Show =

American daily television talk show

- Country of origin: United States
- Original language: English

Original release
- Network: Playboy TV
- Release: 2010 – 2016

The Playboy Morning Show is a live, daily, nationally syndicated talk show that airs internationally on Playboy TV and PlayboyRadio.com.

The show features celebrity guests, models, and games. It airs live from 9:00AM–10:00AM PST Monday-Thursday and is hosted by Playboy Model Andrea Lowell and stand-up comedian Dan Cummins.
