= Susannah Breslin =

American journalist and writer

Susannah Breslin is an American journalist and writer. She is the editor of Forbes's Vices section.

She has been a reporter for the Playboy TV program Sexcetera. Her blogging and television work deals with sexual and pornography-related topics. She has also written for periodicals including Playboy and appeared on Politically Incorrect as well as CNN and Fox News. Her published works include You're a Bad Man, Aren't You?, a book of short stories.

Her blog The Reverse Cowgirl was named by Time.com as one of the 25 best blogs in 2008.

Her memoir, Data Baby: My Life in a Psychological Experiment, will be released on 11 November 2023.
