= 69 Sexy Things 2 Do Before You Die =

- Country of origin: United States

Production
- Running time: 30 mins

Original release
- Network: Playboy TV
- Release: 2008 – March 6, 2009

69 Sexy Things 2 Do Before You Die (stylized 69 Sexy Things 2 Do B4U Die) was a Playboy TV adult newsmagazine profiling exotic locales, outdoor adventures and current erotic trends.

== Premise ==
In a 2008 review, Multichannel News said the show "blend[s] eroticism with information" and is "essentially a travelogue — with nudity." Partially inspired by the film, The Bucket List, 69 Sexy Things 2 Do Before You Die highlighted sexually themed activities for couples. Segments included sensual massages, naked scuba diving, a fetish convention in the Caribbean, a brothel in Prague and bachelor party essentials.

When it debuted, Christie Hefner, then CEO of Playboy Enterprises, called 69 Sexy Things 2 Do Before You Die her favorite new show on Playboy TV. The show was helmed by supervising producer and writer Kira Reed, who had previously appeared on Playboy TV's Sexcetera. The show's directors included Christopher Bavelles, and writers included Joe Diamond and Andrew Knock.

== Format ==
The show had no formal host. Narrators and couples would guide viewers through each segment (usually two per episode), demonstrating how each activity should properly be carried out. Afterwards, website links were displayed for those who wished to follow up on the profile they had just seen.

== Episodes ==
No.	Title	Original release date
1	"Have A Menage-A-Trois / Scuba Dive Naked"	2008
2	"Kink In The Caribbean / The Ultimate Bubble Bath"	2008
3	"Spend Halloween Weekend in San Francisco / Visit Sensual Sedona"	2008
4	"Naked Houseboating / Dine on Naked Sushi"	2008
5	"Discover Sacred Sex / Host a Sex Toy Party"	2008
6	"A Trip to Fantasy Fest / Learn How to Please a Naked Woman"	2008
7	"Naked Launch Your Own Erotic Website / Make Love Under The Northern Lights"	2008
8	"Voyage To Viking Resort / Have A Lesbian Encounter"	2008
9	"Discover AVN Weekend In Las Vegas / Erotic Body Imprints"	2008
10	"Host Indulge Your Inner Desire / 101 Nights of Grrreat Sex"	2008
11	"The Complete Idiot's Guide to Sensual Massage / The Naughty Side Of Paris"	2008
12	"Sex Lessons from Porn Star / Living It Up Mardi Gras"	2008
13	"Glamour Photography Lesson with Arny Freytag / Frolicking at Fun4Two"	2008
14	"A Trip To Tantalizing Tulum / Throw The Ultimate Bachelor Party"	2008
15	"Partying In Prague / Wicked Weekend in Hotlanta"	2008
16	"Visit Haunted New Orleans / VIP Weekend In Montreal"	2008
17	"The Naked Desert / Carma-Sutra"	2009
18	"Bustin' Out at Nudes a Poppin' / Host a Skinny Dipping Party"	2009
19	"Honeymooning in Costa Rica (without getting Married) / Host a Roman Orgy"	2009
20	"Misbehaving in Melbourne / Pump Up with Sexercise"	2009
21	"Live It Up at Swingfest / Learn the Ropes from the Two Knotty Boys"	2009
22	"Take a Spin on a Sex Machine / Get Wet and Wild in Vegas"	2009
23	"Get Naked at Party Cove / Spike It at a Naked Volleyball Tournament"	2009
