= Money Talks (TV series) =

2009 American TV series

- Country of origin: United States

Production
- Running time: 30 mins

Original release
- Network: Playboy TV
- Release: 2009

Money Talks is an adult reality game show currently airing on Playboy TV and produced by adult movie studio, Reality Kings.

== Format ==
Based on the existing adult website Reality Kings, Money Talks uses a man on the street format to get women naked on camera. Typical setups include showing the camera a handful of cash and using it to solicit wild stunts, flashing, and sexual activities from patrons off the street. The show is hosted by Havoc Hailey, although other people have hosted the show on many occasions.

Marketed as an adult version of MTV's Jackass, episodes feature the same female host that appears on the web site and include one R-rated physical stunt, naked shots from women on the street, and a final drawn-out sex act (usually in a business or home), many of which involve relatively unknown or soon-to-be pornstars.
