= Tabitha Stevens =

American pornographic actress (born 1970)

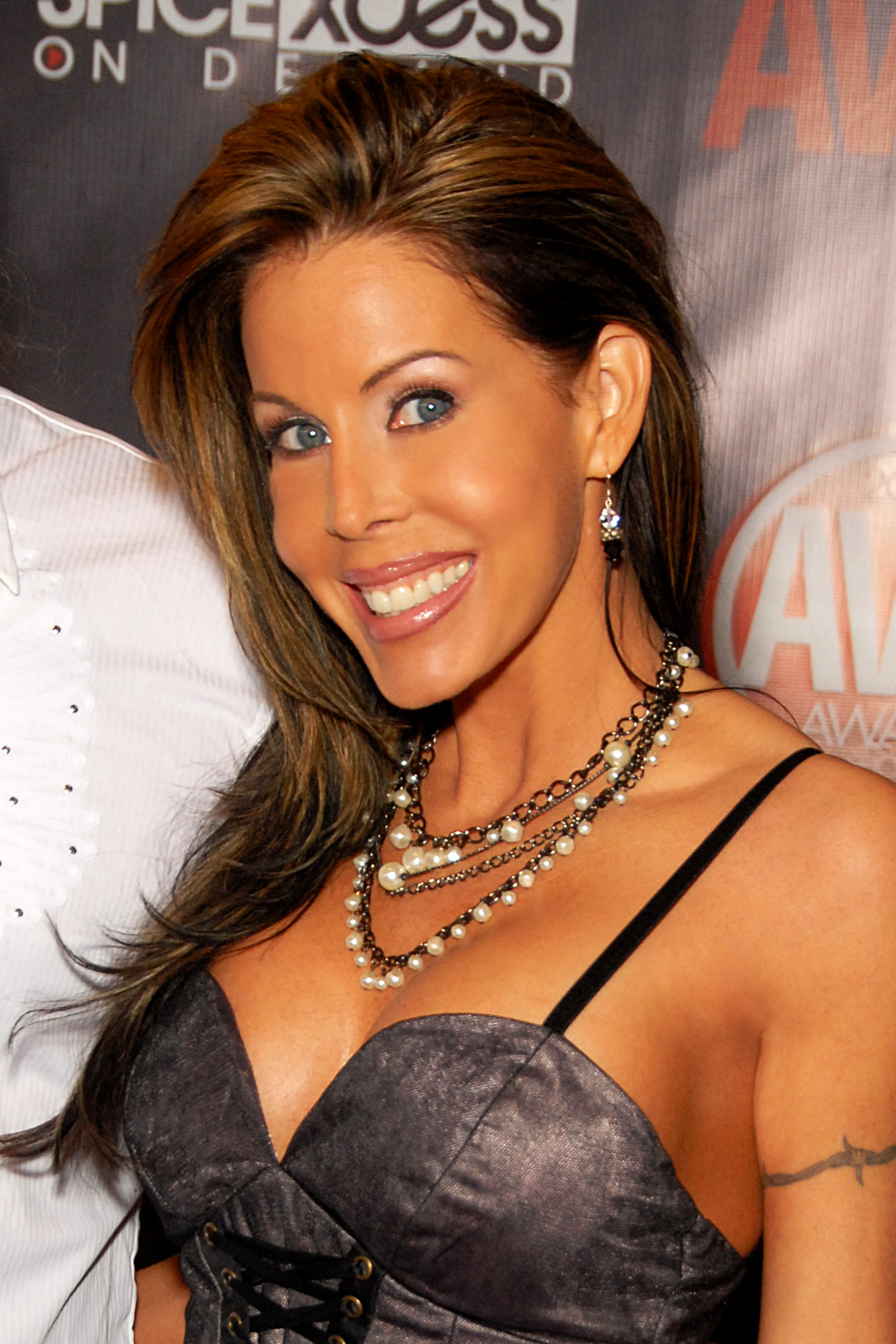
- Stevens attending the AVN Awards show at the Palms Casino Resort, Las Vegas, Nevada in 2010
- Born: February 16, 1970 (age 56); Freeport, New York, U.S.
- Other names: Tabita Stevens; Tabitha; Tabatha Stevens
- Occupation: Pornographic actress
- Height: 5 ft 4 in (1.63 m)
- Spouses: Kenny Gallo (div. 1997); Dan Osterholt (div. 1999); Gary Orona (m. 2007)
- Website: tabithastevens.com

Tabitha Stevens (born February 16, 1970) is an American pornographic actress. In 2007 she was inducted into the AVN Hall of Fame.

== Career ==
Stevens joined the adult-entertainment industry in the summer of 1995 at the age of 25 after meeting erotic performer Racquel Darrian and Darrian's then-husband Derrick Lane at a gym. She started out at first in photo spreads for adult magazines Cheri and Hustler. She was married at the time but divorced her husband soon after entering the industry. Her first scene was with Bobby Vitale in Rolling Thunder for Vivid Entertainment. She took a seven-year hiatus from performing before returning to the business in 2009. During her hiatus, she owned a sex shop with an ex-husband.

In 2007, she was inducted into the AVN Hall of Fame.

=== Mainstream media appearances ===
Stevens has appeared on The Howard Stern Show over 25 times and has made appearances in five seasons of Dr. 90210. She has also appeared in various roles in other television series. Stevens holds a SAG card and has also done commercial work for Capcom's Street Fighter as well as a number of SEGA TV-commercials.

== Personal life ==
Stevens was offered up for adoption by her birth mother before she was born.

Stevens is divorced from porn producer/director and ex-mafioso Kenny Gallo. Their short-lived marriage included a Jerry Springer Show episode titled "I'm Married to a Porn Star!" They divorced in 1997. She was then married to porn producer Don Osterholt. They divorced in 1999. On March 17, 2007, she married porn producer and director Gary Orona, who has a production studio in Utah.

Stevens has reportedly spent approximately $200,000 on plastic surgery. On her original website she describes herself as a "plastic surgery junkie" and provides a list of the many procedures she has undergone:

- 6 breast implant surgeries
- 3 nose jobs
- 2 cheek implant surgeries
- 1 under-the-nose implant
- 1 chin implant
- 1 fat transfer from her right leg to her entire face.
- Frequent Botox treatments
- Frequent restalyne injections in her lips
- 1 nose implant
- Restalyne injections in smile lines
- Anal bleaching
