= Money Talks News =

American personal finance news website

- Genre: Personal Finance
- Created by: Stacy Johnson, CPA
- Presented by: Stacy Johnson
- Country of origin: United States
- Original language: English

Production
- Executive producers: Stacy Johnson; Dan Schointuch
- Production location: Miami, Florida
- Running time: 90 seconds

Original release
- Network: NBC, CBS, FOX, ABC
- Release: 1992 – present

Money Talks News is a consumer/personal finance website offering tips and advice on investing, saving money and avoiding rip offs in the United States market. It was founded and owned by Stacy Johnson. The program's news segments are approximately 1 1/2 minutes in length and air as part of local news programs nationwide. The show is more commonly referred to as Money Talks with Stacy Johnson.

== Distribution ==
Money Talks is distributed nationally as a news segment on NBC, CBS, FOX, and ABC networks. Additionally, editorial pieces are distributed using various websites and web-media outlets under the Money Talks brand.

== Publishers ==
J&G Productions, Inc. publishes the Money Talks with Stacy Johnson television news series and website along with the Life or Debt: Online financial education program, an online financial literacy course used primarily in pre-discharge bankruptcy education by non-profit credit counseling agencies. The course has been approved by the United States Trustee Program.
