= Jenna's American Sex Star =

US television program

- Starring: Jenna Jameson
- Country of origin: United States
- No. of seasons: 2
- No. of episodes: 9

Original release
- Network: Playboy TV
- Release: November 4, 2005 – July 28, 2006

Jenna's American Sex Star is an adult pay-per-view reality television series hosted by Jenna Jameson on Playboy TV that ran from 2005 until 2006.

== Premise ==
In each episode, with Jameson as the host, five contestants competed in a series of sexual performances for a panel of judges. The judges first eliminated a contestant and then viewers voted for their favorite performer on Playboy.com. Winners were awarded an exclusive contract with Jameson's movie studio ClubJenna.

The show also included interviews with porn actors about each contestant. Ron Jeremy did the lead-in and introduction for the first episodes. Subsequent episode lead-ins were done by ClubJenna girls, including Jesse Capelli and McKenzie Lee.

== Judges ==
Season 1 judges included Christy Canyon, Ron Jeremy, and Jim Powers. Season 2 judges included Jim Powers, Jenna Lewis, and Jay Grdina (Jenna's ex-husband). Kiss band member Gene Simmons made an appearance as a guest judge. Playboy TV's Andrea Lowell appears in season 2 as the envelope presenter when girls are to be eliminated or winners were to be announced.

== Contestants ==
Contestants included:

- Michelle Maylene
- Rita Faltoyano
- Roxy Jezel
- Jenna Presley
- Sunny Lane

== Winners ==
The first girl to move on to the finals by popular vote selection was Tiffany Taylor.

Season 1 winner, Brea Bennett, announced in an August 2007 interview that she had left ClubJenna. Season 2 winner, Roxy Jezel, stopped working with ClubJenna after one year, and she stated that she planned to retire in August 2009.

== Production ==
The executive producer of the show was Derek Harvie and Jordan Wiles did the audience casting. Each of the sixty-minute episodes was produced in Los Angeles by the Playboy Entertainment Group.
