= Operation Mend =

UCLA Operation Mend is a medical partnership established in October 2007 between Ronald Reagan UCLA Medical Center, Brooke Army Medical Center in San Antonio, Texas, and the V.A.-Greater Los Angeles Healthcare System that provides reconstructive surgery to U.S. military personnel that have been severely wounded during service in Iraq and Afghanistan. The project aims to serve as a model for other medical institutions interested in helping wounded service members.

The project was developed by Ronald Reagan UCLA Medical Center board member and philanthropist Ronald A. Katz, who was moved to develop Operation Mend after he saw a story about U.S. Marine Aaron Mankin who experienced disfiguring injuries after a road-side bomb ripped through their vehicle on a convoy in Iraq. Mankin would later be Operation Mend’s first patient.

As of 2011, 53 military patients from various military branches had surgeries led by Timothy A. Miller, M.D., Chief of the Division of Plastic and Reconstructive Surgery at UCLA, who is also a military veteran.

Operation Mend procedures include: plastic surgery, orthopaedic reconstruction, urology and otolaryngology to reconstruct severely damaged limbs, radiation oncology, dermatology, neurology, ophthalmology and medical tattooing. Additionally, the project has included the Maxillofacial/Dentistry Department at UCLA, where several patients have had new prosthetic ears designed for them.

Operation Mend patients also have access to the UCLA Brain Injury Research Center, which includes access to the program's mental wellness program, which incorporates neurologic, neuropsychiatric, and psychiatric evaluations and treatment plans.

== Philanthropic support ==
Operation Mend relies on philanthropic donations from business members, community and public donors to care for military patients. It is approximately $500,000 for a wounded warrior to receive a patient evaluation, plastic and reconstructive surgeries, transportation, housing for multiple treatments and other services needed to provide care.

With the help of philanthropic support, Operation Mend has been able to fund over 190 surgeries, schedule 863 appointments, provide 3,876 days of lodging at UCLA’S Tiverton House and provide over 1,000 flight accommodations for patients and their family members.

== Notable donations ==
In October 2011, General Motors donated a 2011 Chevrolet Camaro convertible that was custom designed by the auto restyling business West Coast Customs. The Camaro had a customized camouflage paint design that represents all branches of the U.S. military. The car was auctioned live at the Mecum Auto Auction in Dallas, Texas. The winning bid of $333,000 was made by Ben Mecum on behalf of the Mecum family and the entire Mecum organization. Auction participants Tom Abrams of Reliable Carriers and Ray Claridge of Cinema Vehicle Services each added a $10,000 donation. Reliable Carriers also donated complimentary transport of the vehicle to and from the event. Donations from other buyers, sellers and spectators in the crowd raised an additional $13,000; bringing the total donation from the event to $366,000. The Operation Mend Camaro served as the grand marshal car in New York City's Veterans Day Parade on Nov. 11, 2011. Operation Mend founder Ronald A. Katz, Operation Mend patient Captain James "Jae" Barclay and Camaro owner Ben Mecum all served as special grand marshals for the New York City Veteran’s Day Parade on Nov. 11.

In April 2011, the aerospace and defense company Lockheed Martin donated $4 million to the Operation Mend Project. The donation allowed additional patients to have various surgical procedures and support the renovation of the surgical waiting room and the pre- and post-operative recovery areas at UCLA. The renovation included adding four private patient recovery suites, four new surgical suites and a telemedicine video conference center for patients and their families.

In July 2010, DRS Technologies, Inc., a supplier of integrated products, services and support to military forces, intelligence agencies and prime contractors, raised over $1,000,000 through employee donations to support Operation Mend. As of 2011, DRS Technologies had donated over $1,080,000 to Operation Mend.
