= Night Calls (TV series) =

- Starring: Juli Ashton; Doria Rone; Tiffany Granath; Jesse Jane; Kirsten Price
- Country of origin: United States
- No. of seasons: 11

Production
- Running time: 30 minutes

Original release
- Network: Playboy TV
- Release: 1995 – 2007

Night Calls is an American sexuality-oriented television series on Playboy TV that was broadcast from 1995 to 2007.

== Premise ==
Night Calls is a live phone-in program where listeners are invited to call in and discuss sexual issues—usually fantasies. The show's hosts have invariably been female porn stars, who depending on the nature of the call may interact with the caller while performing (non-explicit) sexual acts such as masturbation or playing with sex toys. Sometimes the callers (male and female) will be heard engaged in sexual activity of their own, ranging from masturbation to intercourse.

== History ==
Originally featuring hosts Juli Ashton and Doria Rone (1996–1998), Doria was eventually replaced by Tiffany Granath. Granath and Ashton co-hosted the show from November 1998 until early 2006 at which time the show was recast and reworked. In early 2006, Playboy TV cast adult stars Jesse Jane and Kirsten Price in the host roles for the final 14 months of the series' run.

A British version of the show also exists (on Playboy One).

The American version was filmed in Los Angeles, and it was redesigned when Jesse Jane started presenting. In its final incarnation, the series used a far larger set with striptease poles, a house band and a live studio audience.

== Spinoffs ==
The Helmetcam Show ran on Playboy TV from July 17, 1996 to July 19, 2000. Eighty live episodes were produced. The show was hosted and produced by Gary Gray. Featuring a conventional talk show format, and conceived as a low-cost promotional opportunity for other PlayboyTV programming, the show highlighted clips from other PlayboyTV shows.

Night Calls 411 ran on Playboy TV from 2000 to 2005. It focused on sex tips and featured an ethnically diverse cast. It was originally hosted by Crystal Knight and Flower Edwards, with Tera Patrick as the "Net Nympho", who read e-mail and bantered with the hosts while disrobing. Patrick left after the first season as her career ascended but returned in June 2001 as co-host when Flower was pregnant. Kitana Baker took over the part of "Net Nympho". Tera was replaced by Nikki Nova in February 2003 when she got in a contract dispute with her company, Digital Playground. Nova would remain co-host until the show's demise; Knight was on for the entire run. A month later, Nicole Oring became the "Net Nympho".

Night Calls 411 originally ran 8 p.m. to 9:30 p.m. PST on the second and fourth Wednesdays of each month except January and August (i.e. on the weeks Night Calls wasn't on) until July 2004. From October 2004 to its abrupt demise in May 2005, it ran once a month, on a Friday, for an hour. During this time, they had rotating guests as the "Net Nympho". Night Calls 411 became Playboy TV's highest rated and most successful TV show in history.

Night Calls Hotline ran from 2004 to 2005. It was hosted by Ashley Blue, Nautica Thorn, and Ann-Marie (who later left to do Private Calls).

In 1998, Ashton and Rone co-starred in a feature-length direct-to-video motion picture entitled Night Calls: The Movie in which the two appeared as themselves.

Playboy Radio, Sirius & XM channel 102, continues to air a version of Night Calls, co-hosted by adult film stars Debi Diamond and Nicki Hunter.

== See also ==
- Lesbianism in erotica
