= Sexcetera =

American television series focused on human sexuality

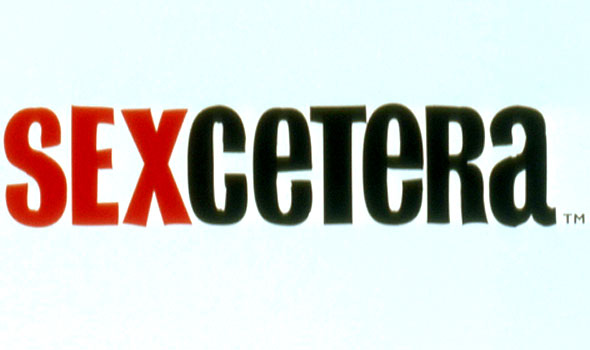
- Genre: Erotica
- Directed by: Michael Guttsen
- Starring: Various
- Composer: Jerrold Launer
- Country of origin: United States
- Original language: English
- No. of seasons: 10
- No. of episodes: 106

Production
- Executive producers: Paul Cockerill; Frank Martin; Rudy Poe
- Running time: 60 minutes
- Production company: Q Studios

Original release
- Network: Playboy TV
- Release: November 1, 1998 – 2005

Sexcetera is an American television newsmagazine airing on Playboy TV, focused on human sexuality, that was broadcast from 1998 until 2005. Sexcetera ran for more than 106 episodes. By the time the program went off the air in 2005, it had become one of Playboy TV's longest-running shows.

Sexcetera was previously repeated from time to time on Real Lives, Pick, Sky Living and Virgin1 in the United Kingdom, RTL 7 in the Netherlands, TV5 in Finland and AXN in Italy.

The show featured four to five reports per one-hour episode. Filmed throughout the world, but primarily in the United States, the reports generally covered sexual fetishes, adult entertainment expos and gatherings, current erotic trends, sex toys, porn celebrities and tips for couples.

Correspondents presented their stories in a humorous style; female correspondents often appeared in the nude. As befitting its subject matter, the series is sexually explicit, with unsimulated sexual activity shown from time to time, with increasing explicitness as the series went on.

== Reporters ==
- Valerie Baber
- Kara Blanc
- Susannah Breslin
- Hoyt Christopher
- Ralph Garman
- Frank Gianotti
- Lauren Hays
- Asante Jones
- Andrea Lowell
- Gretchen Massey
- Sam Phillips
- Scott Potasnik
- Kira Reed
