= Playboy TV =

American premium television network

- Country: United States
- Broadcast area: United States, Canada, Latin America, Europe, Japan, South Korea, Israel

Programming
- Languages: English; Spanish
- Picture format: 480i (SDTV) (Americas); 576i (SDTV) (Europe); 1080i (HDTV) (United States, Latin America and Russia)

Ownership
- Owner: Rainbow Programming Services (1980–1983; distribution until 1986); Playboy Inc. (1982–2011); Aylo (2011–present)

History
- Launched: July 1979; 47 years ago
- Former names: Bravo! (1979–1980); Escapade (1980–1982); The Playboy Channel (1982–1989); Playboy at Night (1989–1994)

Links
- Webcast: Live TV
- Website: Playboy TV

Playboy TV (originally The Playboy Channel) is an American-based multinational premium television channel that is owned by Canadian pornographic media conglomerate Aylo. The service—which licenses its name from the American men's lifestyle and entertainment magazine founded by Hugh Hefner, under a branding agreement with owner and publisher PLBY Group—offers a broad range of adult entertainment programming consisting of softcore pornographic films, original series and documentaries.

Playboy TV is distributed via cable, IPTV and satellite providers in the United States, Canada, Latin America, Europe, Japan, South Korea and Israel, and is sold on a pay-per-view basis in selected countries.

== History ==
Playboy TV originally launched in July 1979 as Bravo!, a nighttime-only premium channel targeted at adults that broadcast on Sunday and Monday nights. Founded by cable television provider Daniels & Associates, the service offered a double feature of PG or R-rated B movies that were broadcast twice each night, and premiered at least eight new movies per month. In July 1980, Daniels and fellow cable providers Cablevision and Comcast formed the joint venture Rainbow Programing Services (now AMC Global Media), which announced plans to merge Daniels-owned Bravo! and Cablevision-owned pay channel Action Plus into a single service that, along with a planned arts-focused premium channel that would share the same channel space, would transmit on the Comstar II satellite (under a lease agreement with the Times Mirror Company).

Bravo! rebranded as Escapade on December 9, 1980, broadcasting on Tuesday through Saturday nights from 9:00 p.m. to 6:00 a.m. ET (or as early as 4:00 a.m. on some cable systems). The channel's former name and timeslots were taken by Rainbow's other new pay service Bravo, which featured programming centered around the performing arts, foreign and arthouse films. The satellite time utilized by the two networks was subleased from the National Christian Network. By July 1981, the service expanded to seven nights a week.

In August 1981, Playboy Enterprises became half-owner of Escapade and announced a plan to produce original programming that reflected the contents of Playboy magazine beginning in early 1982. On January 21, 1982, the Playboy Channel on Escapade debuted as a four-hour programming block on Thursday and Friday nights. The first program was an interview with John and Bo Derek, followed by footage of January playmate Shannon Tweed, the West German adult movie Vanessa, and magazine features including "Ribald Classics". Over the months that followed, Escapade would gradually increase the amount of Playboy programming.

The channel officially relaunched as the Playboy Channel on November 18, 1982. The original programming and style of the Playboy Channel was developed by Hugh Hefner, and producer Michael Trikilis. Playboy hired its own sales and marketing staff and launched the channel on several major multiple system operators. At the time of its launch, programming consisted of R-rated films plus a music video program, Playboy's Hot Rocks, based on the then-new cable channel MTV but with more explicit videos usually only seen at nightclubs. The channel was broadcast for only ten hours each day, from 8 p.m. to 6 a.m. ET, during its first eleven years. In October 1983, Rainbow Media exited the partnership by selling its share to Playboy, but would continue to distribute the channel until 1986. The channel re-launched as Playboy at Night on November 1, 1989. During this era, original programming contained NR-rated films. The network expanded its programming with the adoption of a 24-hour schedule and adopted its current name in 1994.

In 2008, the channel launched its HD simulcast feed under the name "Playboy TV HD".

In November 2011, Playboy Enterprises sold its ownership of its media properties (including the Spice Networks) to Manwin (later MindGeek and Aylo), who would operate them, including Playboy TV, under the "Playboy Plus Entertainment" subsidiary. Although Playboy Enterprises later re-acquired their website, Aylo still continues to operate Playboy TV under license.

In spring 2023, Playboy TV launched on Tricolor TV.

== Programming ==
Playboy TV was originally developed as a video version of Playboy magazine. Programming featured music reviews, celebrity interviews, men's fashion and segments on cars. It was a video extension of the magazine - an established lifestyle brand. Slowly the programming on the channel evolved to feature more attractive women and eventually soft core features. This then evolved to what would become more standard television programming with a focus primarily on a male demographic.

In 2010, Playboy TV unveiled a new program slate, which featured series tailored to both male and female viewers.

=== Programs on Playboy TV ===
- 69 Sexy Things 2 Do B4 U Die
- Around the World in 80 Babes
- Badass!
- Brooklyn Kinda Love
- Candid Camera
- Canoga Park
- Cougar Club
- Dark Justice
- The Tryst List
- Early Bird Yoga
- E-Rotic
- Electric Blue
- Fantasies
- "Foursome (2006 TV series)"
- FrolicMe Passion
- FrolicMe Stories
- Hot Babes Doing Stuff Naked
- Inside Out
- Intimate Tales
- Jazmin's Touch
- Jenna's American Sex Star
- King of Clubs
- Money Talks
- Naughty Amateur Home Videos
- Night Calls
- Playboy Centerfolds
- Playboy Muses
- Playboy Shootout
- Playmates!
- Really Naked Truth
- Sam's Game
- School of Sex
- Search for the Perfect Girlfriend
- Secret Sessions
- Seduction Principles
- Seven Motives
- Sex Court
- Sexcetera
- Spa X
- Suite Rendezvous
- Sexcape
- Show Us Your Wits
- Surfing Attraction
- Swing
- Tales of Erotica
- The Life Erotic
- The Tryst List
- Totally Busted
- Triple Play
- Undercover
- Women on Sex
- World of Playboy
