= Gods in Polyester =

Book

Gods in Polyester: A Survivors' Account Of 70's Cinema Obscura
- Language: English
- Genre: Non-fiction
- Published: 2004
- Publisher: Succubus Press
- ISBN: 9789080870017
- OCLC: 173085215

Gods in Polyester: A Survivors' Account Of 70's Cinema Obscura is a cult film book covering mainly American obscure, low-budget, and independent film horror, sci-fi, exploitation film, Blaxploitation, Spaghetti Western, and action films that were created between 1970 and 1981.

This book was published by Succubus Press in 2004. This publishing company was based in Amsterdam, Netherlands. The book was compiled and edited by Suzanne Donahue and Mikael Sovijärvi.

== Contributors ==
- Ed Adlum Invasion of the Blood Farmers, Shriek of the Mutilated
- Laurel Barnett The Child
- George Barry Death Bed: The Bed That Eats
- Margaret Blye Final Chapter: Walking Tall, The Sporting Club, The Machine Gun Kelly Story
- Lynn Borden Walking Tall
- Don Dohler Fiend, The Alien Factor
- Robert DoQui Coffy, Walking Tall Part II
- John P. Dulaney Squadra Antiscippo, Squadra Antitruffa, Squadra Antifurto, The Crystal Man
- T.G. Finkbinder The Redeemer
- Robert S. Fiveson Parts: The Clonus Horror
- George Buck Flower The Capture Of Bigfoot, The Alpha Incident, Tender Loving Care, Carnal Madness, Ilsa, She-Wolf of the SS, Ilsa, Harem Keeper of the Oil Sheiks, Candy Tangerine Man, Lady Cocoa, The Executioner, The Witch Who Came From The Sea, Flash and the Firecat, Drive-In Massacre
- Lawrence D. Foldes Don't Go Near The Park
- Leo Fong The Last Reunion, Ninja Assassins, Bamboo Trap, Blind Rage, Murder in the Orient
- Bruce Glover Black Gunn, Walking Tall, Walking Tall Part II, Final Chapter: Walking Tall
- Gary Graver Texas Lightning
- William Grefe Mako: Jaws Of Death, Stanley, Impulse, Whiskey Mountain
- John D. Hancock Let's Scare Jessica to Death
- Richard Harrison Beast with a Gun, Fireback, Joe Dakota, Achtung! The Desert Tigers, Boxer Rebellion, Marco Polo, Voodoo Baby, Sex Explosion, Reverendo Colt, Churchill's Leopards, Holy Water Joe, Dig Your Grave, Friend...Sabata's Coming, Black Gold Dossier
- Ron Honthaner The House on Skull Mountain
- Jack Jones The Comeback
- Donald G. Jackson Demon Lover Diary
- Bruce Kessler Simon, King of the Witches
- John Phillip Law Death in November, Ring Of Darkness, The Spiral Staircase, The Crystal Man, Whisper in the Dark
- Jeff Lieberman Squirm, Blue Sunshine, Just Before Dawn
- Ted V. Mikels The Corpse Grinders, Blood Orgy of the She Devils, The Doll Squad
- Mel Novak Cat in the Cage, Black Belt Jones, Lovely But Deadly, The Ultimate Warrior, Game of Death, Truck Turner, Tom Horn
- Felton Perry Sudden Death, Walking Tall
- Hy Pyke Lemora, Slithis, Nightmare in Blood, Dolemite, The Amorous Adventures Of Don Quixote And Sancho Panza, The Way He Was
- Linnea Quigley Don't Go Near The Park, Graduation Day, Psycho From Texas
- Bill Rebane The Giant Spider Invasion, The Alpha Incident
- Alan Scarfe Cathy's Curse
- Ferd Sebastian 'Gator Bait
- William Shatner Impulse
- Scott Shaw The Demon Lover
- David Sheldon Lovely But Deadly, Sheba Baby, Just Before Dawn, Grizzly, Project: Kill
- Carol Speed The Mack, Abby, Savage, Bummer, The Big Bird Cage, Disco Godfather, The New Centurions, Dynamite Brothers, Black Samson
- George Stover Fiend, The Alien Factor
- Manuela Thiess Barn of the Naked Dead
- Norman J. Warren Prey, Satan's Slave, Terror, Inseminoid
- Marc Wielage Satan's Children

== ISBN ==
Gods in Polyester: A Survivors' Account Of 70's Cinema Obscura. ISBN 90-80870013
