= Orion (film) =

- Directed by: Asiel Norton
- Written by: Asiel Norton
- Starring: David Arquette and Lily Cole
- Cinematography: Lyn Moncrief
- Edited by: Michael Palmerio
- Release date: August 1, 2015 (Fantasia International Film Festival)
- Running time: 110 minutes
- Country: United States
- Language: English

Orion is the second feature film by writer/director Asiel Norton. It premiered at the Fantasia International Film Festival in 2015, before going into commercial release in 2017. It stars David Arquette and Lily Cole.

== Plot ==
The film is set a century after the collapse of civilization in a wasteland known as The Rust. The last human survivors exist in squalor. Arquette plays The Hunter, a man who wanders into an area controlled by The Magician, a man who is more than human.

== Cast ==
- David Arquette
- Lily Cole
- Goran Kostić
- Terri Partyka
- Jimmy Doom
- Lisette Miller
- Sophia Findley
