= Mel Novak =

American actor (1934–2025)

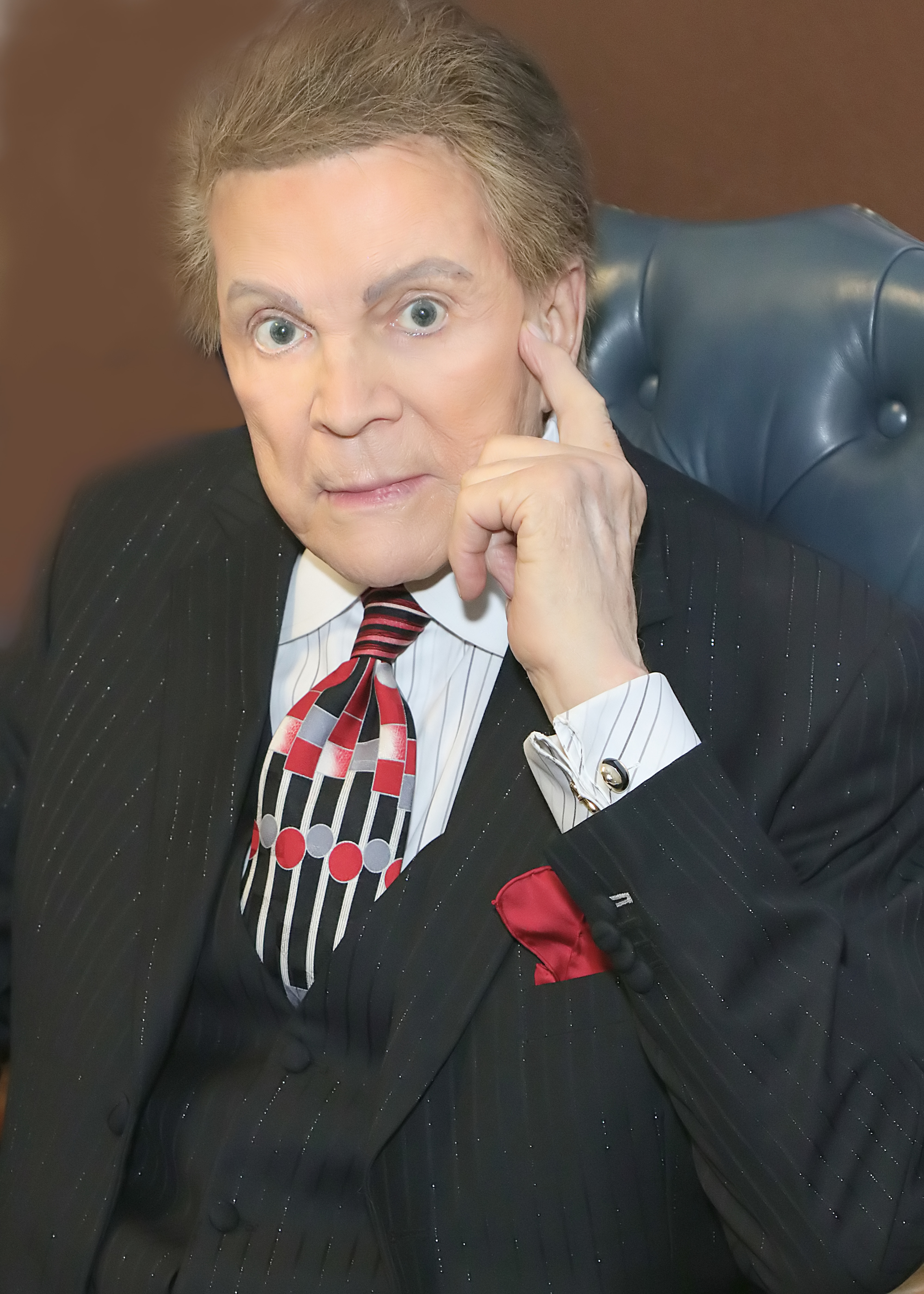
- Novak in 2020
- Born: Milan Mrdjenovich; June 16, 1934; Pittsburgh, Pennsylvania, U.S.
- Died: April 9, 2025 (aged 90); Granada Hills, California, U.S.
- Occupation: Actor
- Years active: 1971–2020
- Children: 2

Milan Mrdjenovich (Serbian: Милан Мрђеновић, Milan Mrđenović; June 16, 1934 – April 9, 2025), known as Mel Novak, was an American actor who was best known for villainous roles in Black Belt Jones, Game of Death, and An Eye for an Eye. He was also known for doing all of his own stunts and fighting scenes.

== Career ==
=== 1970s–1980s ===
Born in Pittsburgh on June 16, 1934 to Serbian parents, Novak made his film debut in 1974, appearing in two blaxploitation films, Truck Turner starring Isaac Hayes and Black Belt Jones starring Jim Kelly that was directed by Robert Clouse that led to a part in Clouse's The Ultimate Warrior (1975) starring Yul Brynner. Cat in the Cage (1978) starring Sybil Danning, and others followed. One of his more high-profile parts from the 70's was as the hitman Stick in Game of Death (1978), again directed by Robert Clouse. Novak also had roles in two Chuck Norris films, A Force of One (1979) and An Eye for an Eye (1981). After the turn of the 1980's, Novak acted mostly in independent features, such as Lovely But Deadly (1981) for director/producer David Sheldon, starring B-movie heroine Lucinda Dooling.

=== 1990s–2000s ===
In the 1990s, Novak appeared in two films for director Garry Marshall: Exit to Eden (1994), based on the novel by Anne Rice, and Dear God (1996).

In 2005, Novak appeared in the action/horror film Vampire Assassin, also featuring Gerald Okamura, with whom Novak acted in several films, and Rudy Ray Moore. In 2008, Novak was inducted in the Martial Arts Hall of Fame in London. In 2015, Novak had a prominent role in the action film, Samurai Cop 2: Deadly Vengeance.

In 2020, Novak had a role in the Leo Fong 2010 film, Hard Way Heroes.

== Personal life and death ==
Novak was also an ordained minister, known for doing celebrity funerals and memorials for the likes of Chuck Connors' son, Jeffrey Alan Connors, and Tim Burton's father, Bill Burton. He worked in skid row and prison ministry for over 39 years. He also had two daughters, Nikol and Lea, and three grandchildren from daughter Lea.

Novak died at a hospice in Granada Hills, California, on April 9, 2025, at the age of 90.

== Filmography ==
Film
Year	Film	Role	Notes
1974	Black Belt Jones	Blue Eyes	
1974	Truck Turner	Doctor	Alternative title: Black Bullet
1975	The Ultimate Warrior	Lippert	Alternative titles: The Barony; The Last Warrior
1978	Game of Death	Stick	
1978	Missile X: The Neutron Bomb Incident	Mendosa	Alternative title: Teheran Incident
1978	Cat in the Cage	Ralph Desmond	
1979	A Force of One	The Announcer	
1980	Tom Horn	Corbett's bodyguard	
1981	Lovely But Deadly	Warren Lang	
1981	Force: Five	The Assassin	
1981	An Eye for an Eye	Montoya	
1985	Force of Darkness	Conrad	
1985	Sword of Heaven	Dirk	
1989	Family Reunion	Tom Andrews	
1991	Capital Punishment	Mason Dover	Alternative title: Kickbox Terminator
1993	Expert Weapon	Miller	Alternative title: American Dragon
1994	Pocket Ninjas	Mr. Kaufman	Working title: Skate Dragons; Alternative title: Super Sonic Pocket Ninjas on Wheels; Foreign release title: Triple Dragon
1994	Direct Hit	Kovar	
1994	Exit to Eden	Walker's henchman	
1996	Dear God	Sidewalk Minister	
1997	Future War	Otis	
1997	Moonbase	Guard	
1999	The F-Zone	Priest	
2002	Power Elite	President Jonathan Caine	
2003	GiAnts	Jonathan Caine	Direct-to-DVD release
2005	SWAT: Warhead One	Dick Danvers	Direct-to-DVD release
2005	Vampire Assassin	Gustoff Slovak	Alternate title: Vampire Assassins
2006	Big Guns	Larry Armstrong	Direct-to-DVD release
2008	Drifter TKD	Thomas Tyler	
2010	Hard Way Heroes	Super Fly	
2015	Samurai Cop 2: Deadly Vengeance	Cutter	
2016	Enter the Samurai	Himself	Documentary on the creation of Samurai Cop 2:Deadly Vengeance
2017	Syndicate Smasher	Milan	
2017	Steve McQueen: American Icon	Himself	Documentary
2017	Check Point (2017 film)	The Reverend	
2017	Holy Terror	Father Murphy	
2017	Toxic Tutu	Himself, Associate Producer	
2017	Nemesis 5: The New Model	Red Army Hammerhead Leader	
2018	Tales of Frankenstein	Dr. Mortality	
2018	An Hour to Kill	Mr. Kinski	
2019	Gangsters Incorporated	Stick	
2019	Robowoman	Dr. Michaels	
2019	Eternal Code	Mr. Pomeroy	
2020	The Beast Beneath	Mayor George Reid	
2020	Tales from the Campfire 3	Dr. Challis	
2020	Ebola Rex	General Davis	
2020	Ebola Rex Versus Murder Hornets	General Davis	
2022	Ash and Bone	Bartender Louie	
Television
Year	Film	Role	Notes
1971	The F.B.I.	Policeman	1 episode
1973	Mannix	Elmo Bagley	1 episode
1976	The Blue Knight	Steve	1 episode
1976	Ark II	First guard	1 episode
2006	Pastor Greg	Man with dog	1 episode

== Bibliography ==
- Gods in Polyester or, a Survivor's Account of 70s Cinema Obscura. Succubus Press. 2004. ISBN 90-80870013.
- Gods In Spandex or, a Survivor's Account of 80s Cinema Obscura. 2007.
