= Simone Cilio =

Italian film composer

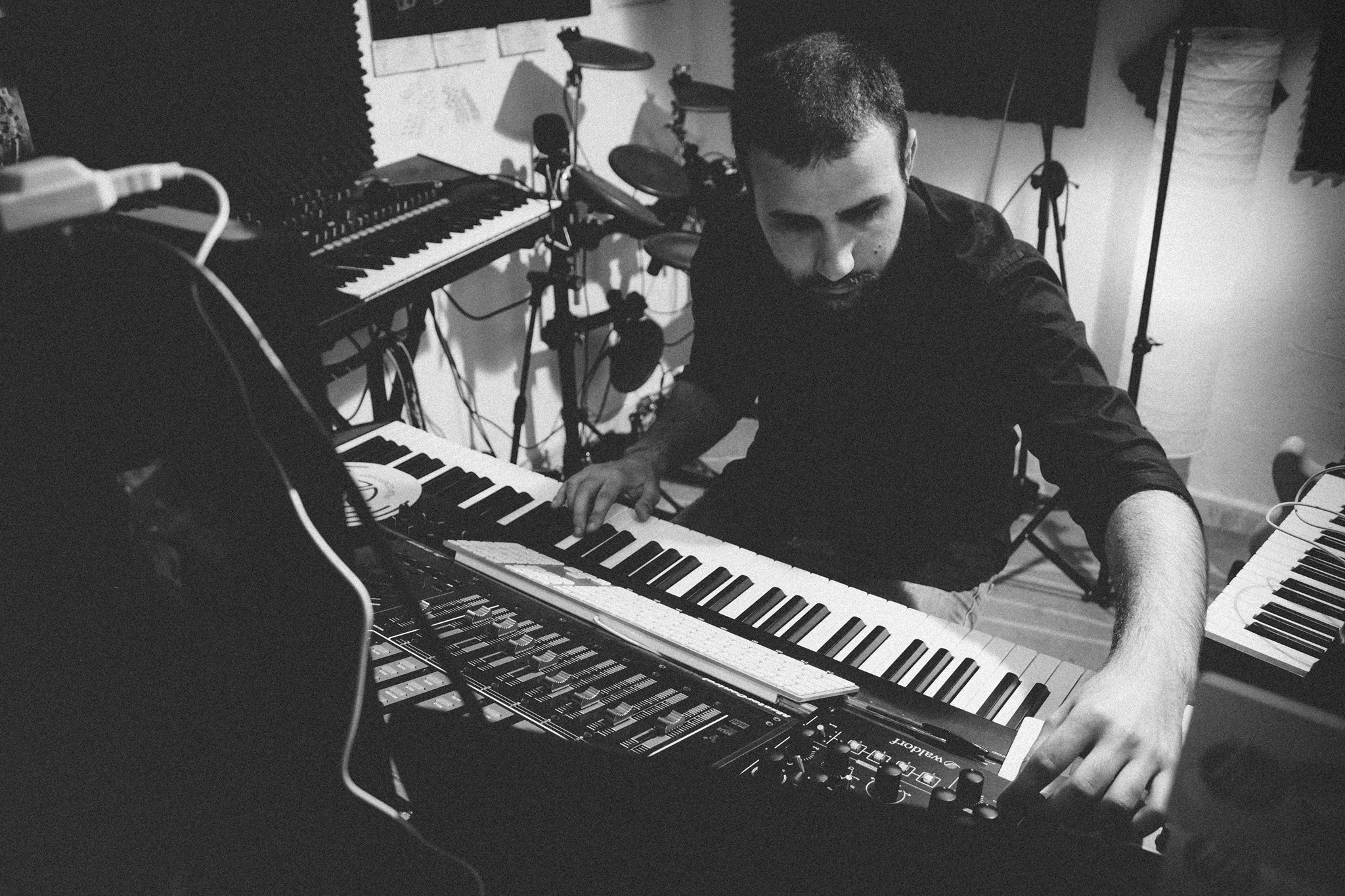

Background information
- Born: Simone Antonio Cilio; 4 September 1992 (age 33); Niscemi, Italy
- Genres: Film music
- Occupation: Film Composer
- Instruments: Piano, keyboard, synthesizer, guitar, drums
- Years active: 2009–present
- Website: simonecilio.com

Simone Antonio Cilio (born 4 September 1992) is an Italian film composer best known for his film scores.

== Life and career ==
Simone Cilio was born in Niscemi, Italy. In his early career, he worked on the feature film Badsville; his score was nominated as Best Original Score at the Maverick Movie Awards.

== Filmography ==
=== 2013 ===
- Next To Me (short film) – directed by Sara Mignogna
- How to kill my boyfriend (short film) – directed by Alfonso Perugini
- Avenge my eyes (short film) – directed by Alex Kaplan
- Cinema Cafe (web series) – directed by Paolo Brancati
- La Grande Festa – Capurso (documentary) – directed by Antony Pepe

=== 2014 ===
- L'Evento – directed by Lorenzo D'Amelio
- Nella tasca del cappotto (short film) – directed by Marco Di Gerlando
- The War at Home (short film) – August Dannehl
- One Night Only (short film) – directed by Brendan Elmore
- Wrong Way (web series) – directed by Ninni Palma
- La proposta (short film) – directed by Mirko Salciarini
- Bastard! (short film) – directed by John Gallegos
- Punctum (short film) – directed by Michael Gaddini

=== 2015 ===
- Censurado, Ode to love – directed by Mauro Russo Rouge
- Il ricordo di una lacrima – directed by Mario Santocchio
- The Last One – directed by Lee Thongkham (additional music)
- Tears in the dust – directed by Steve Call (additional music)
- The Miracle Archives (short film) – directed by Victor Olea
- Ladies First (short film) – directed by Matthew Staggles
- Chroma Heist (short film) – directed by Charlene Jeter
- Bad Dreams (short film) – directed by Alessandro Wingfield
- A Girl and Her Gun – directed by Paul Holbrook
- Chloe (short film) – directed by Kat Pan
- Making Magic (short film) – directed by Hajar Naim

=== 2016 ===
- Art of Deception – directed by Richard Ryan
- Skulls – directed by Nicholas Winter
- Space Dogs – The Movie – directed by Matt Greenhalgh
- Aberrante – directed by Mauro Russo Rouge
- One Step Beyond (documentary) – directed by Frank Tierens
- La Forza della Fragilità (documentary) – directed by Maurizio Rigatti
- The Reaping (TV series) – directed by Roberto D'Antona
- The Border (short film) – directed by Norman Tamkivi
- Voice Of Grace (short film) – directed by Laurel Ripley
- A girl and her Gun (short film) – directed by Paul Holbrook and Samuel Dawe
- Brothers (short film) – directed by Magdalena Zielinska
- Discrete Indiscretion (short film) – directed by Charlene Jeter
- Il Naso Rosso (short film) – directed by Simone D'Angelo
- Maximus Invictus (short film) – directed by Marie-Joseph Vijay, Maxime Cailiau, Alpha Omar Diallo

=== 2017 ===
- Khoj – directed by Arka Ganguly
- Coincidence Theory – directed by Carly Street
- A Suíte Epifânica de Luiza – directed by Elvis DelBagno
- Love Espionage – Spy Revenge – directed by Charlene Jeter
- Losing Life (short film) – directed by Musab Alamri
- Mayday – directed by Massimiliano Cerchi
- And Now a Word From a Gamer (feature documentary) – directed by Steve Wollett
- The Last Signal (feature documentary) – directed by Kyle Olson
- Skin Creepers – directed by Ezra Tsegaye
- Klippers – directed by Ofu Obekpa
- New Boy (short film) – directed by Norman Tamkivi
- Devil 13 (short film) – directed by Robert Bryce Milburn
- Badsville – directed by April Mullen

=== 2018 ===
- -M- – directed by Lorenzo D'Amelio
- The Rover – directed by Tom Connors
- Volvo Corporate Film – directed by Line Up Communications
- Lockdown – directed by Massimiliano Cerchi
- Olam Cocoa 2018 (corporate film) – director by The Herd Represented
- Belmond Grand Tour 2018 (corporate films) – directed by The Herd Represented
- Stan The Man – directed by Brandon Amelotte
- I Futurieri (short film) – directed by Simone D'Angelo
- Bleed American (feature film) – directed by Tre Manchester
- Belmond – Castello di Casole (Corporate film) – directed by The Herd Represented
- Belmond – Otto Galeng (Corporate Film) – directed by The Herd Represented
- Their War (short film) – directed by Max Mason
- Lockly (commercial) – directed by John Agcaoili

=== 2019 ===
- Dagli Occhi Dell'Amore – directed by Adelmo Togliani
- The Hayfield Hauntings (TV Series) – directed by Tre Manchester
- K.R.A.P. (short film) – directed by Brynn Chamblee & Hayley Holmes
- Ipsos Creative Excellence (corporate film) – directed by LineUp Communications

=== 2020 ===
- Resilienza – directed by Antonio Centomani
- The Penthouse – directed by Massimiliano Cerchi
- A Dark Path – directed by Nicholas Winter
- Anti Coronavirus – directed by Mitesh Patel
- Active Shooter – directed by Robert Bryce Milburn
- Project Boost (videogame) – developed by Immersion Plus
- A Werewolf in England – directed by Charlie Steeds
- Strangeville – directed by Stephen Osborne

=== 2021 ===
- The Game – directed by Brynn Chamblee
- The Monument of Tolerance – directed by Tracie Hunter
- Werewolf Castle – directed by Charlie Steeds
- Homestead – directed by Ehrland Hollingworth

=== 2022 ===
- The Bouncer – directed by Massimiliano Cerchi
- The Haunting of Bloody Tower – directed by Charlie Steeds
- Survivor’s Choice – directed by David Clair-Bennett
- Ash and Bone – directed by Harley Wallen

=== 2023 ===
- Homestead – directed by Ehrland Hollingsworth
- Adrenaline - directed by Massimiliano Cerchi

=== 2024 ===
- The Martial Avenger – directed by Claudio Del Falco
- Four. - directed by Canyon Prince
- Monster On A Plane - directed by Ezra Tsegaye
- Neighbors Who Kill - directed by Kris Black
- He Sees You When You're Sleeping - directed by Charlie Steeds

=== 2025 ===
- The Workout - directed by James Cullen Bressack
- As Night Falls - directed by Leroy Kincaide
- Aladdin - directed by Brett Bentman
- Aladdin's Revenge - directed by Brett Bentman

=== 2026 ===
- Nanny Cam - directed by Jenni Farley JWoow
- Death of a Brewer - directed by Mokotsi Rukundo
- Abominable - directed by Ivan Mulero
- Betty's Revenge - directed by Brett Bentman

== Awards ==
Year	Film Festival	Nominee – Work	Result
2014	Ballston SPA Film Festival	Best Original Score for Nella tasca del cappotto	Nominated
2014	Los Angeles Music Awards	Best Instrumental Artist of the Year	Nominated
2016	Los Angeles CineFest	Best Original Score for The Miracle Archives	Finalist
2016	The Monthly Film Festival	Best Original Score for The Border	Won
2016	Global Music Awards	Best Original Score for New Hope	Bronze Medal
2016	United International Film Festival	Best Original Score for The Border	Nominated
2016	Utah Music Awards	Best Original Score for The Road	Nominated
2016	Chandler International Film Festival	Best Original Score for The Border	Won
2016	Hollywood Music in Media Awards	Best Contemporary Classical/Instrumental	Nominated
2016	Monthly Film Festival	Best Original Score for The Border	Won
2016	NYC Indie Film Festival	Best Original Score for Discrete Indiscretion	Won
2016	Maverick Movie Awards	Best Original Score for Badsville	Nominated
2016	LA Shorts Awards	Best Original Score for Discrete Indiscretion	Diamond Award
2016	Shortpole London IFF	Best Original Score for The Border	Won
2016	Hollywood International Moving Pictures Film Festival	Best Original Score for The Border	Won
2016	Depth of Field International Film Festival Competition	Best Original Score for Art of Deception	Won
2016	LA Shorts Awards	Best Original Score for The Border	Silver Award
2016	Hollywood Boulevard Film Festival	Best Original Score for The Border	Won
2016	Hollywood International Moving Pictures Film Festival	Best Original Score for The Road	Won
2016	International Independent Film Awards	Best Original Score for Art of Deception	Won
2017	STARS Hollywood Festival	Best Original Score for One Step Beyond	Won
2017	Top Shorts Film Festival	Best Original Score for Voice of Grace	Won
2017	Miami International Science Fiction Film Festival	Best Original Score for Art of Deception	Won
2018	Independent Shorts Awards	Best Original Score for Their War	Platinum Award
2018	Top Shorts Film Festival	Best Original Score for Voice of Grace	Audience Choice Award
2019	Oniros Film Awards	Best Original Score for Against All Odds	Honorable Mention
2020	Hollywood Music in Media Awards	Best Contemporary Classical/Instrumental	Nominated
2021	Top Indie Film Awards	Best Original Score for Ash and Bone	Nominated
2021	Lonely Wolf International Film Festival	Best Original Score for Steps	Nominated
2022	Independent Shorts Awards	Best Original Score for The Game	Won
2025	Paris Film Awards	Best Original Score for Cyber-Psycho Chronicles	Won
2025	Hollywood Gold Awards	Best Original Score for Cyber-Psycho Chronicles	Won
2025	New York Movie Awards	Best Original Score for Cyber-Psycho Chronicles	Won
2025	International Gold Awards	Best Original Score for Cyber-Psycho Chronicles	Won
