= An Hour to Kill =

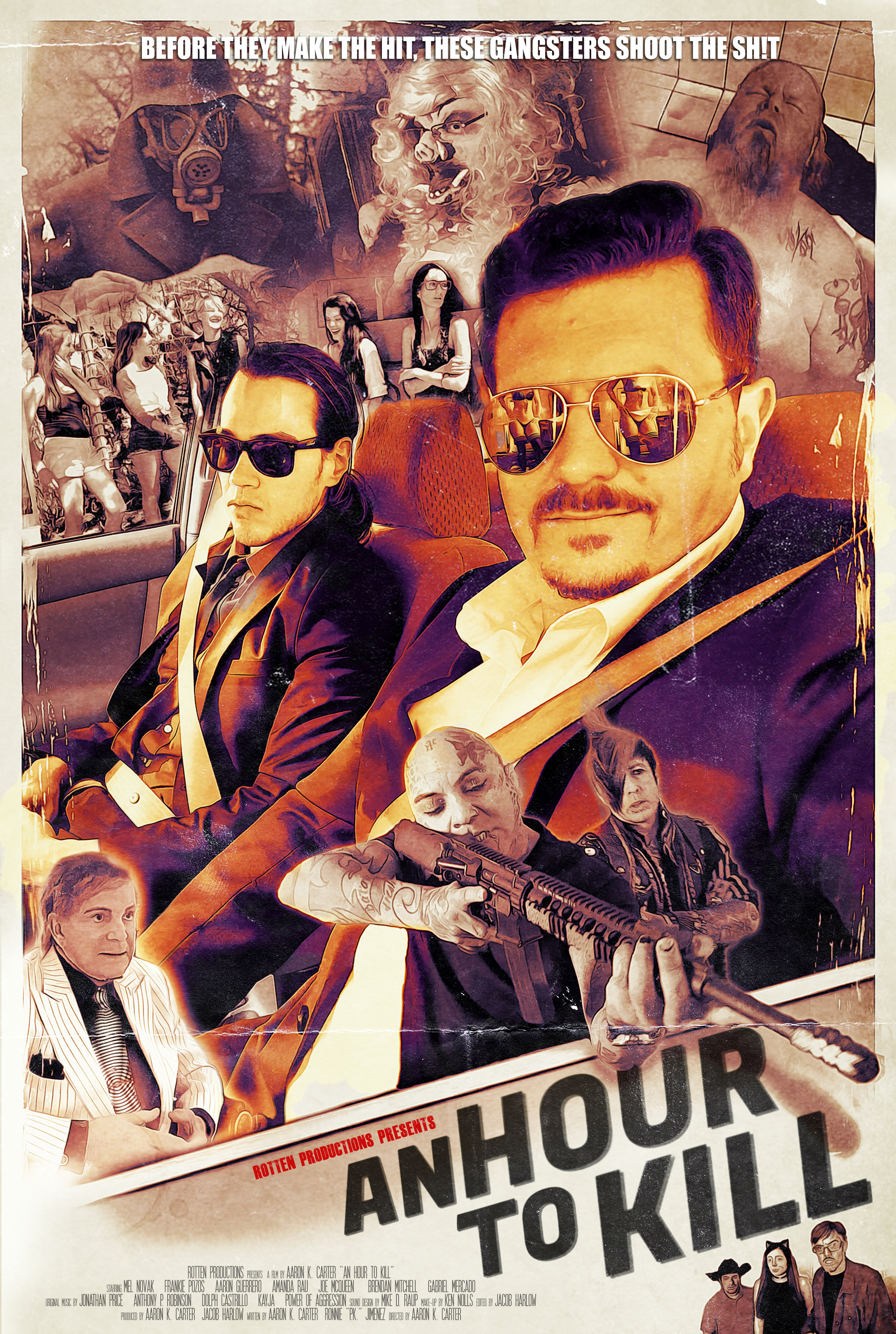
- Directed by: Aaron K. C
- Written by: Aaron K. Carter; Ronnie Jimenez
- Produced by: Jacob Harlow; Aaron K. Carter
- Starring: Mel Novak; Aaron Guerrero; Frankie Pozos
- Cinematography: Adam Ledezma; Brendan Mitchell; Eddie Ra
- Edited by: Jacob Harlow
- Release date: October 22, 2018 (United States)
- Running time: 96 minutes
- Country: United States

An Hour to Kill is a 2018 comedy horror anthology film, directed by Aaron K. Carter. It stars Mel Novak, Aaron Guerrero and Frankie Pozos. The film was released on Amazon Prime on October 22, 2018.

== Premise ==
Two hired killers, Frankie (Frankie Pozos) and Gio (Aaron Guerrero), under the guidance of their Mob Boss Mr. Kinski (Mel Novak), have an hour to kill before their next hit. To help pass the time, they entertain themselves by telling horror stories to one another. The story segments are Valkyrie's Bunker, Assacre and Hog Hunters.

== Cast ==
- Mel Novak as Mr. Kinski
- Aaron Guerrero as Gio
- Frankie Pozos as Frankie
- Amanda Rau as Jenna
- Veronica Ricci as Petunia
- Joe McQueen as Lenny
- Brendan Mitchell as Brendan
- Gabriel Mercado as Gabe

== Awards ==
The film won best director, Horror Action Comedy for Aaron K. Carter and best actor for Mel Novak at the 2019 Los Angeles Nollywood Awards.
