= Lily Cole =

English actress, model and film director (born 1987)

- Lily Cole, Tribeca Film Festival, 2012
- Born: Lily Luahana Cole; 27 December 1987 (age 38); Torquay, Devon, England
- Education: University of Cambridge
- Occupations: Actress; model; author; film director; entrepreneur
- Years active: 2000–present
- Organisation: Impossible.com
- Children: 1
- Awards: Honorary degree for contribution to humanitarian and environmental causes, Glasgow Caledonian University, 2013.
- Modelling information
- Hair colour: Red
- Eye colour: Blue
- Agency: IMG Models (worldwide); CAA
- Website: lilycole.com

Lily Luahana Cole (born 27 December 1987) is an English actress, model, author, and entrepreneur. Cole pursued a modelling career as a teenager and was listed in 2009 by Vogue Paris as one of the top 30 models of the 2000s. She was booked for her first British Vogue cover at age 16, named "Model of the Year" at the 2004 British Fashion Awards and has worked with many well-known brands, including Alexander McQueen, Chanel, Louis Vuitton, Jean Paul Gaultier and Moschino. Her advertising campaigns have included Longchamp, Anna Sui, Rimmel and Cacharel.

Cole's first leading role as an actress was as Valentina in the 2009 film The Imaginarium of Doctor Parnassus. Her other film work includes Passages, a short directed by Shekhar Kapur, and There Be Dragons directed by Roland Joffé. In 2013, Cole founded impossible.com, an innovation group and incubator (previously a gift economy social network, now renamed Impossible People).

In 2020, Cole published Who Cares Wins, a book about how humans' lives impact the planet and how humans can respond to climate emergency challenges. In 2021, the book was turned into a podcast in which Cole invites guests with different perspectives to explore critical issues—and their relationship to the environment—ranging from technology and food to mental health and capitalism.

== Early life and education ==
Cole was born in Torquay, Devon, to Patience Owen, an artist and writer, and Chris Cole, a fisherman and boat builder. She has no contact with her father, who left home when she was a baby; she and her sister were raised by their Welsh mother in London.

Cole attended Hallfield Primary School, the Sylvia Young Theatre School, and St Marylebone School. At Latymer Upper School, where she completed her sixth form studies, she achieved A grades in her A-levels in English, politics, and philosophy and ethics.

She gained a place to read Social and Political Sciences at King's College, Cambridge in 2006, deferring entry twice. In 2008 she switched to history of art and graduated in 2011 with a double first.

== Modelling ==
=== Magazines and fashion shows ===
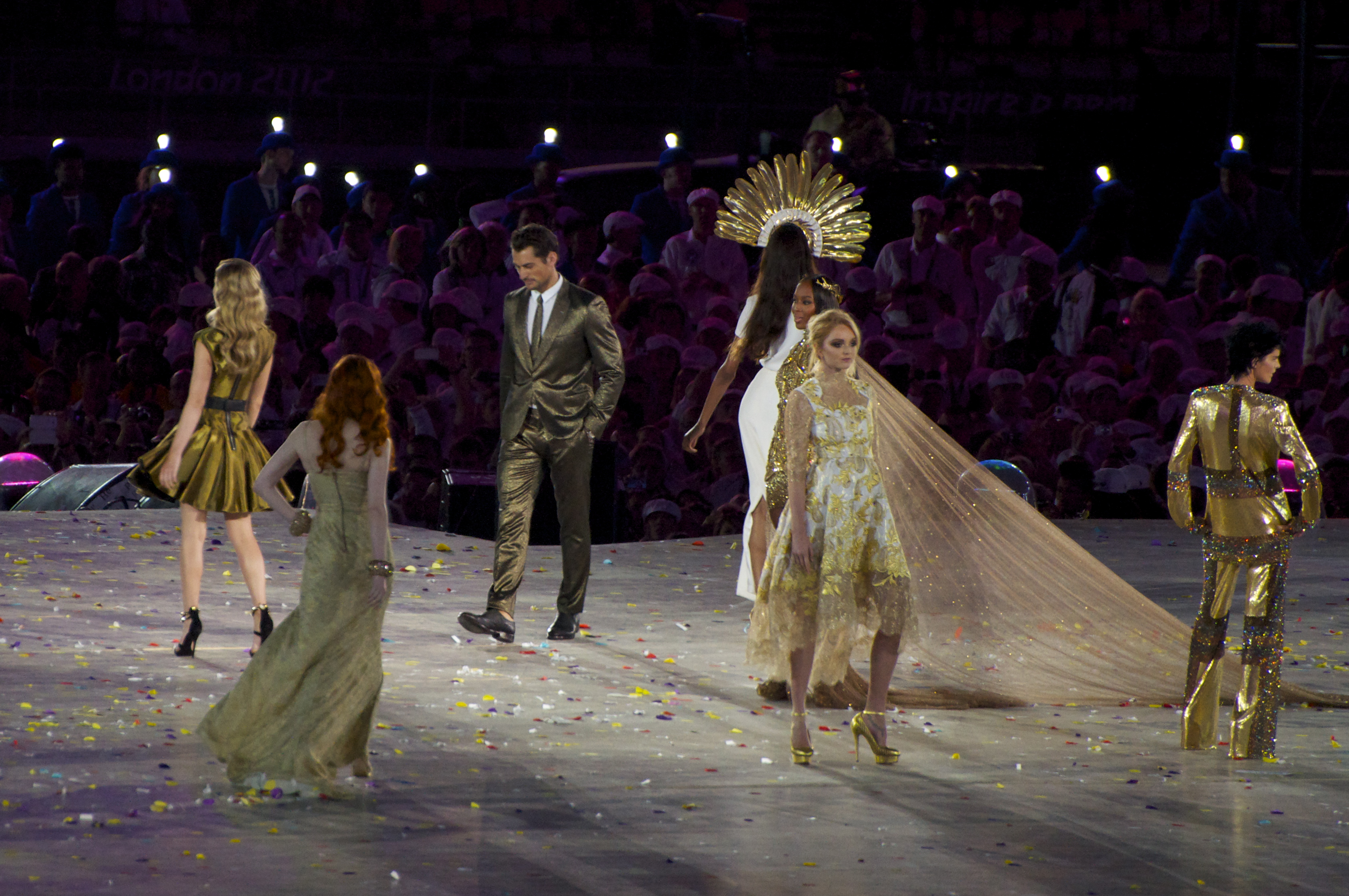
Cole (second from right) at the 2012 Summer Olympics closing ceremony in London

Cole was photographed in 2001 at age 13 by fashion photographer Mariano Vivanco. According to the Evening Standard in 2004, her modelling career began in 2003 when she was approached in the street by Benjamin Hart of Storm Models. She signed with Storm and in 2003 was photographed by Steven Meisel for Italian Vogue. Her distinctive red hair attracted significant media attention. At the 2004 British Fashion Awards, she was named "Model of the Year".

Cole worked with many prominent photographers, including Craig McDean, Nick Knight, Juergen Teller, Arthur Elgort, Irving Penn and Tim Walker. She has appeared on the covers of Playboy in France, Vogue, Citizen K, and V, among others. She featured on Vogue's "best dressed" list in December 2005, and had cover appearances on Numéro and Interview.

She modelled on the international runway circuit and at many fashion shows on behalf of Chanel, Shiatzy Chen, DKNY, Jean Paul Gaultier, Versace, Alexander McQueen, Jasper Conran, John Galliano and Louis Vuitton. She was nominated, for the second time, for the "Model of the Year" award at the 2007 British Fashion Awards. In December 2009 she was listed by Vogue Paris as one of the top 30 models of the 2000s. Cole made a cover appearance on the January 2010 issue of the Canadian Elle and opened Hermès's winter 2010/2011 collection at Paris Fashion Week in March. Towards the end of 2010, she featured in a documentary chronicling the career of Rolf Harris in which he painted her dressing up as Titania from A Midsummer Night's Dream. Cole has additionally graced the covers of Vogue (UK, Russia, Korea), Harper's Bazaar (UK, Japan, Korea, Thailand, Russia, Ukraine, Taiwan, Turkey) and i-D.

During the Closing Ceremony of the 2012 London Olympics, Cole was one of the British models wearing fashions created by British designers specifically for the event.

=== Advertising ===
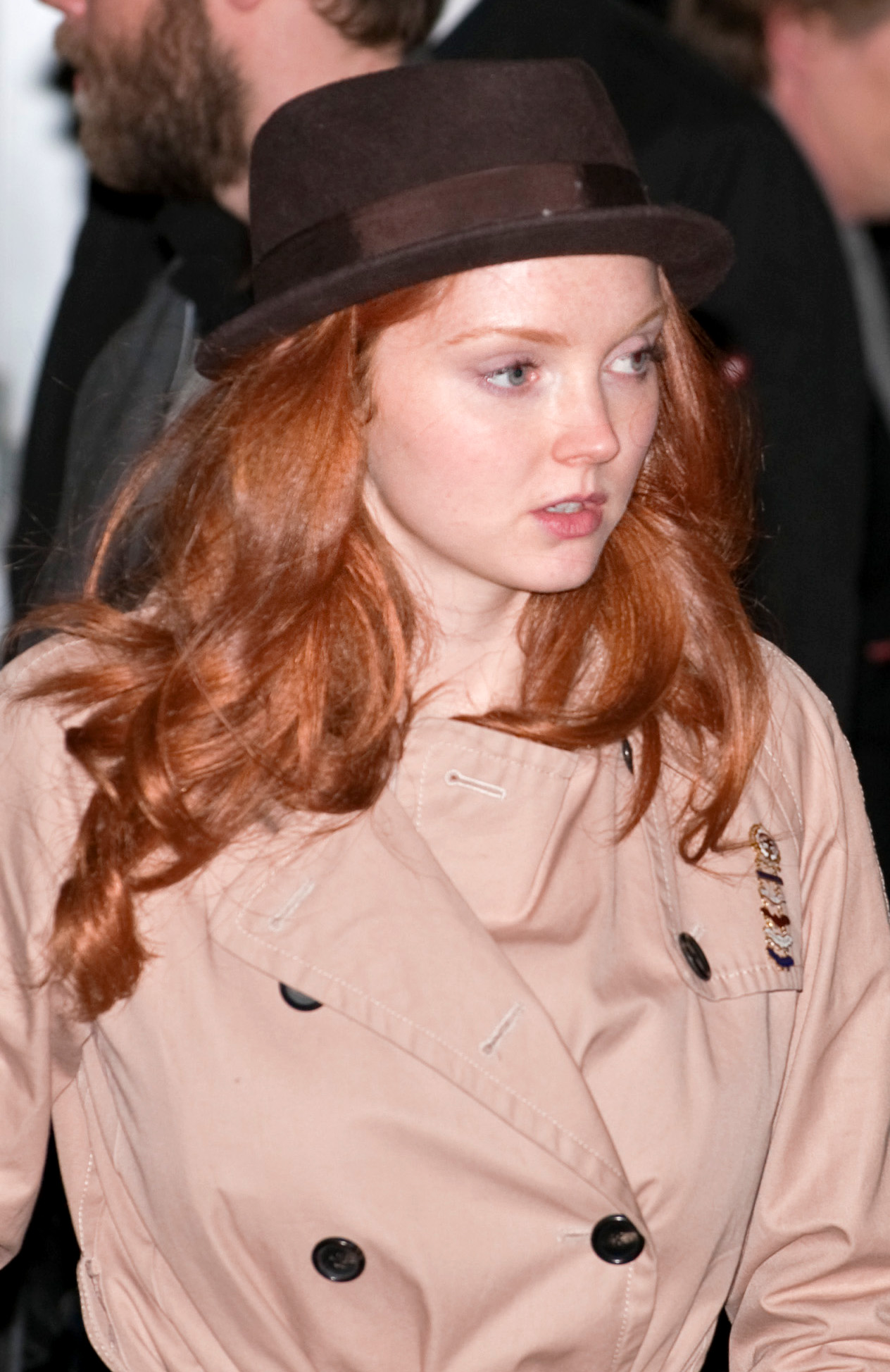
Cole in Berlin, 2009

Cole has appeared in advertising campaigns for Chanel, Christian Lacroix, Hermès, Longchamp, Cacharel, Topshop and Anna Sui cosmetics, as well as being the face for Moschino's perfume "I Love Love". In September 2007, Cole was announced as the follow-up model for Accessorize, taking the place of Claudia Schiffer, also designing a line of handbags for the collection.

Cole has been modelling for cosmetics company Rimmel London since October 2009, as well as featuring in advertisements for jewellers Tiffany & Co. Along with Twiggy and others, Cole became a "face" of Marks and Spencer clothes advertising campaign, making her the youngest model in a campaign for the company.

She launched a campaign in June 2010 at Gatwick Airport for modelling agency, Storm Model Management. The campaign aims to find new modelling talent from people passing through the airport, with the agency hoping to re-create the discovery of Kate Moss, who was spotted at JFK Airport in 1988 by the agency's founder.

In March 2012 The Body Shop launched its Beauty With Heart campaign, naming Cole as its first ambassador.

== Acting ==
=== Films ===
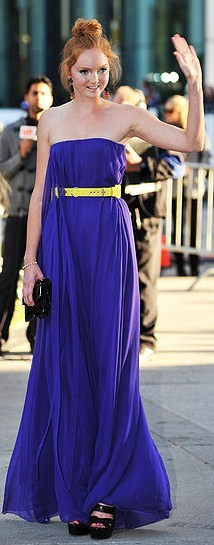
Cole promoting The Imaginarium of Doctor Parnassus at the 34th Toronto International Film Festival in September 2009

Cole made her acting debut as Polly in the 2007 comedy St Trinian's, a rework of the black and white films of the 1950s and '60s, alongside Rupert Everett, Colin Firth, Russell Brand, Jodie Whittaker and Stephen Fry.

Her first leading role came in Terry Gilliam's 2009 fantasy film, The Imaginarium of Doctor Parnassus, playing Valentina, the teenage daughter of Christopher Plummer's title character, Dr Parnassus, whom Parnassus has promised to the Devil (Tom Waits) upon her 16th birthday. Acting alongside Heath Ledger (who died before filming had finished), Cole, in an interview for the Daily Telegraph admitted that, at times, she felt out of her depth in the role—saying "I'd only done a couple of films and here I was surrounded by amazing actors like Christopher Plummer and Heath Ledger, and it was intimidating at times", also describing the role as "the biggest role I've ever done".

Gilliam said of Cole: "She has an amazing look and grasps what is required so very quickly. If she wants a career as an actress, she has a brilliant future". According to Mark Olsen of The Los Angeles Times, writing as Parnassus was released in the United States, "Cole brings a surprising well of emotional tenderness to her part as Valentina", while Ryan Michael Painter wrote of the film on 'inthisweek.com' that "all of the performances are delightful, particularly Cole's as Valentina, proving that the haute couture model has more to offer this world than a pretty face".

Cole appeared at the 34th Toronto International Film Festival in December 2009 to promote Parnassus. She was featured as herself in one episode of the online series T Takes, a series of short, improvised films published by The New York Times. Cole appeared as "Lettuce Leaf", a celebrity supermodel in the 2009 film, Rage, directed by Sally Potter. Cole also played "Aline" in the 2011 film There Be Dragons.

In January 2010, Cole gave an interview to the Canadian edition of Elle in which she expressed her desire to focus more on acting than on her modelling career, saying she "wouldn't want to treat acting as a convenient thing to do now and again", going on to mention her roles in the upcoming films There Be Dragons and Phantasmagoria: The Visions of Lewis Carroll and saying of her modelling "I've been doing modelling for years and I feel like I've taken out of it what I need to and I'm ready for new things" and that "film asks for a much bigger emotional and intellectual commitment." Cole had a part in Mary Harron's The Moth Diaries, which was released in 2012.

=== Other roles ===
Cole made a minor appearance in the music video for the Girls Aloud and Sugababes cover of "Walk This Way" in aid of the charity Comic Relief, in which she struts up and down a catwalk in "hilarious ways", interspersed by the bands and several well-known British television personalities. Cole had another minor role in Primal Scream's 2008 video "Can't Go Back", in which she and other models featured in a horror-style video based on the films of Dario Argento. The models, including Cole, are graphically "murdered" and "meet their ends in rather striking ways" with the aim of looking "hot even when dead". Cole again starred in a music video for Paul McCartney's song "Queenie Eye" featuring a number of actors and musicians including Gary Barlow, James Corden, Jude Law and Johnny Depp.

It was reported in October 2009 that Cole would make her stage debut at the Old Vic Theatre in London's West End at the theatre's annual "24 Hour Plays" held in November, but "scheduling commitments" forced her to pull out. Cole ultimately made her stage début at the ADC Theatre in Cambridge, as Nina in a student production of The Seagull.

She appeared in "The Curse of the Black Spot", the third episode of the sixth series of science fiction series Doctor Who, in May 2011. She played a Sea Siren. Cole stars in the music video for Yeah Yeah Yeahs' 2013 single "Sacrilege" as a woman burned alive by the many men and women with whom she has had affairs. In 2017, Cole starred in the title role in the three-part docu-drama miniseries Elizabeth I, which aired on Channel 5 from 9 to 23 May.

== Charity work ==
=== Overview ===
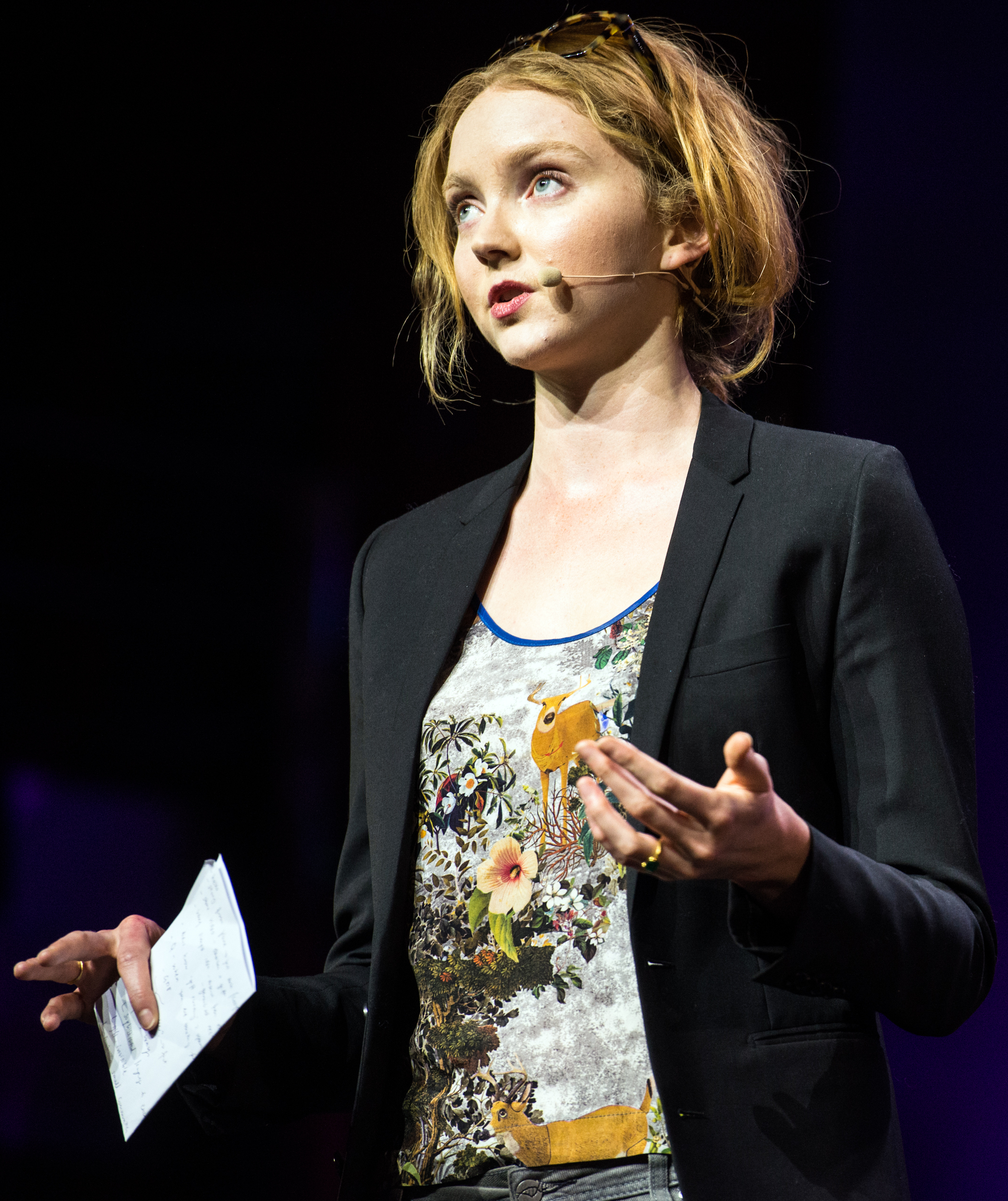
Lily Cole in London, 2013

Cole supports a variety of humanitarian and environmental causes. She supports the charity WaterAid, speaking for the organisation's "End Water Poverty" campaign, and the Environmental Justice Foundation Cole has modelled a T-shirt with the slogan "Save the Future" to fight child labour in the fashion industry for the Environmental Justice Foundation. Most recently Cole put a plaster cast bust of her torso on the auction site eBay to raise money for British telethon charity Comic Relief.

In December 2009, Cole attended a party, hosted by Elton John for which guests were asked to design their ideal bar with the designs then sold at auction in aid of the Elton John AIDS Foundation.

In October 2010, she helped launch the World Land Trust's Emerald for Elephant Exhibition, which was designed to create awareness and raise important funds for the protection of the critically endangered Asian elephant.

In August 2012, she was part of the judging panel at the Festival of Code, held at the culmination of Young Rewired State 2012.

In 2013, PETA cited her efforts to make consumers aware of animal products in cosmetics and declared her to be one of the "Sexiest Vegetarians" of the year.

For the bi-centenary of writer Emily Brontë, The Parsonage Museum, Haworth, has appointed Cole to be its "creative partner" to "commemorate the legacy of one of England's most important, and mysterious, writers".

In 2016 Cole was appointed a Fellow of the Foundling Museum in London. In 2018 she co-wrote Balls, a short film exploring connections between the Foundling Hospital story and Emily Brontë's much-loved novel Wuthering Heights. Balls is co-written by Lily Cole and Stacey Gregg, and produced by Kate Wilson at Fury Films. The film has been co-commissioned by the Foundling Museum, Brontë Parsonage Museum and Rapid Response Unit, with support from Arts Council England.

=== Environmental campaigning ===
In 2005 Cole announced she would no longer model for De Beers after being alerted to the situation of the Kalahari Bushmen being evicted from their lands in Botswana.

In 2006, Lily took part in the Tree-Athlon in Battersea Park, a fundraising event by Trees for Cities combining a 5km run, tree planting, and urban tree wishes to support community tree planting projects. She continued to be a patron for Trees for Cities for many years.

Cole wrote the foreword for Tamsin Blanchard's 2007 book Green Is The New Black, a guide to being fashionable while remaining eco-friendly.

In 2013 it was announced that Cole would receive the Doctor of Letters for her "outstanding contribution to humanitarian and environmental causes" from the chancellor of Glasgow Caledonian University, Professor Muhammad Yunus.

Cole was one of several celebrities who endorsed the parliamentary candidacy of the Green Party's Caroline Lucas at the 2015 general election.

== Business activities ==
Cole is the founder of Impossible.com, an innovation group and incubator. Cole is also part-owner of a London bookshop and an advisor to Wikitribune.

Cole was involved in creating an environmentally friendly knitwear company, The North Circular, which launched in 2009. The North Circular products are hand knit in the UK with British yarns, from which 5% of all profits, and all of Cole's, are donated to the Environmental Justice Foundation. She launched a womenswear range for the company in February 2010.

== Personal life ==
On 28 February 2015, Cole announced she was expecting her first child with her boyfriend, Kwame Ferreira. Their daughter was born in September 2015. In 2021, Cole came out as queer during an interview with The Sunday Times Style. Cole is a pescatarian but eats "mostly vegan".

== Bibliography ==
- Who Cares Wins (2020, 2023 Hardcover) ISBN 978-0-7893-4409-0

== Filmography ==
Film and television
| Year | Title | Role | Notes |
|---|---|---|---|
| 2007 | St. Trinians | Polly | |
| 2009 | Rage | Lettuce Leaf | |
| 2009 | The Imaginarium of Doctor Parnassus | Valentina | |
| 2009 | Passage | Tania | Short film |
| 2011 | There Be Dragons | Aline | |
| 2011 | Doctor Who | The Siren | Episode: "The Curse of the Black Spot" |
| 2011 | The Moth Diaries | Ernessa Bloch | |
| 2012 | Confession of a Child of the Century | Elsie | |
| 2012 | Snow White and the Huntsman | Greta | |
| 2013 | The Zero Theorem | Woman in street commercial | |
| 2013 | Red Shoes | The dancer | Short film |
| 2015 | The Messenger | Emma | |
| 2015 | Orion | | |
| 2015 | Gravy | Mimi | |
| 2016 | Absolutely Fabulous: The Movie | Herself | |
| 2017 | Elizabeth I | Elizabeth I | Miniseries; 3 episodes |
| 2017 | Star Wars: The Last Jedi | Lovey | |
| 2018 | London Fields | Trish Shirt | |
| 2018 | Upstart Crow | Ephie | |
| 2019 | Icons – Artists | Herself | BBC documentary series |
| 2022 | The Split | Bella | Series 3 |
| 2022 | Hilma | Mathilda | |

Music videos
| Year | Title | Artist |
|---|---|---|
| 2007 | "Walk This Way" | Girls Aloud and Sugababes |
| 2012 | "UK Shanty" | Clean Bandit |
| 2013 | "Sacrilege" | Yeah Yeah Yeahs |
| 2013 | "Queenie Eye" | Paul McCartney |
| 2018 | "Selfies in the Sunset" | Gruff Rhys |

== Notes ==
^[n 1] Cole gives her date of birth as 27 December 1987. Several sources, such as New York Magazine and Fashion Model Directory, cite 19 May 1988 as her date of birth, however, her birth was registered with the General Registry Office of England and Wales (GRO) three months earlier, in February 1988 and checkcompany.co.uk confirms December 1987 as her date of birth.
