= Beneath Us All =

2023 film by Harley Wallen

- Directed by: Harley Wallen
- Written by: Bret Miller
- Produced by: Harley Wallen; Kaiti Wallen; Michael James Alexander; Annette Cama; Courtney Hamilton Vanloo; Joseph Williamson
- Starring: Sean Whalen; Maria Olsen; Angelina Danielle Cama; Kaiti Wallen; Yan Birch
- Cinematography: Alex Gasparetto
- Edited by: Johnny Flynn
- Music by: Kaizad Patel; Firoze Patel
- Production companies: Painted Creek Productions; Westside Warrior Films; Cama Productions
- Distributed by: Deskpop Entertainment
- Release date: September 19, 2023
- Running time: 91 minutes
- Country: United States
- Language: English

Beneath Us All is a 2023 American horror film directed by Harley Wallen. It stars Sean Whalen, Maria Olsen, Angelina Danielle Cama, Kaiti Wallen, and Harley Wallen.

== Plot ==
In Scandinavia in 912 AD, a man named Frey is ritually buried alive in a coffin following his capture. In the present day, teenage foster child Julie lives in a neglectful and abusive foster home operated by Janelle and Todd Gibbs, along with several other foster children. While exploring the woods near the property, Julie discovers a buried coffin containing a weakened, ancient being named Frey, accompanied by a Yggdrasil pendant. Believing him to be a human victim in need of aid, she conceals him in an abandoned barn and attempts to nurse him back to health.

Frey, a long-starved supernatural entity with vampiric characteristics, gradually regains his strength by feeding on humans, resulting in a series of violent attacks and disappearances. As Julie begins to experience disturbing nightmares and increasing influence from the entity, a social worker and local law enforcement become involved in investigating the household and the related incidents of violence. The narrative combines supernatural horror elements with depictions of neglect and dysfunction within the foster care system.

== Cast ==
- Sean Whalen as Todd Gibbs
- Maria Olsen as Janelle Gibbs
- Angelina Danielle Cama as Julie
- Kaiti Wallen as Rebecca
- Harley Wallen as Detective Donovan Booker
- Michael James Alexander as Manny
- Yan Birch as Frey
- Shelby Bradley as Mikaela Campbell
- Malachi Myles as Stephen
- Hanna Wallen as Sarah
- Emilia Wallen as Erica

== Production ==
The film was directed by Harley Wallen. It was produced by Harley Wallen and Kaiti Wallen for Painted Creek Productions, in association with Westside Warrior Films and Cama Productions. Sean Whalen was cast in the lead role as Todd Gibbs.

== Release ==
The film was released theatrically in limited release and on digital platforms on September 19, 2023, by Deskpop Entertainment. It is available for streaming and rental on services such as Amazon and Apple TV.

== Reception ==
On review aggregator Rotten Tomatoes, the film holds an approval rating of 100% based on 5 reviews. Bobby LePire of Film Threat rated the film a 10 out of 10. Michael DeFellipo of Horror Society gave the film a score of 8 out of 10.
