= The Alchemist (film) =

- Theatrical release poster
- Directed by: Charles Band
- Written by: Alan J. Adler
- Produced by: Lawrence Appelbaum
- Starring: Robert Ginty; Lucinda Dooling; John Sanderford; Viola Kates Stimpson; Robert Glaudini
- Cinematography: Andrew W. Friend
- Edited by: Ted Nicolaou
- Music by: Richard Band
- Distributed by: Empire Pictures
- Release dates: 1983 (Norway); May 31, 1985 (U.S.)
- Running time: 86 min
- Country: United States
- Language: English

The Alchemist is a 1983 American horror film about a man who desires to avenge a curse placed on him by an evil magician. The film was directed by Charles Band (under the pseudonym James Amante), and stars Robert Ginty, Lucinda Dooling and John Sanderford.

== Plot ==
=== 1871 ===
Anna McCallum (Lucinda Dooling) is walking through the woods at night, seemingly drawn to something. Meanwhile, her husband, Aaron (Robert Ginty), is tucking their daughter, Esther, into bed.

Aaron goes out looking for Anna, and sees her approaching the mysterious man named DelGatto (Robert Glaudini) who has enchanted her. Aaron attacks DelGatto, but in the process accidentally stabs his wife, killing her.

“You will forever remain an animal,” says DelGatto to Aaron, “forced to kill to live—this is my curse, for eternity!” He promptly disappears in a blaze of fire.

=== 1955 ===
Aaron chases a deer in the woods and kills it with his bare hands. He returns home, more animal than man, and his now-elderly daughter Esther (Viola Kates Stimpson), after waiting for the animal in him to reside, lets him in. Aaron collapses on the floor, and Esther takes care of him.

Esther begins to cast a spell. While driving down a highway, young former-waitress Lenora Sinclair (also played by Lucinda Dooling) suddenly sees a vision of Anna on the night she died, and a hideous monster. After the vision subsides, Lenora resumes inexplicably driving to Charlotte.

Along the way, she picks up hitchhiker Cam Rawlins (John Sanderford) who recently got out of the army.

Esther resumes her spell to release Aaron's soul by trading hers for his, but the spell goes wrong. Lenora has another vision, seeing Anna's hand get clawed by a monster. Lenora screams and drives off the road, her hand now bleeding exactly where the monster clawed Anna's. Cam wraps her hand and she admits to him that someone is pulling her into the surrounding mountains. Cam encourages her to see a doctor, offending her.

Using DelGatto's grimoire and effects, Esther continues her spell. Now, Lenora begins somnambulist driving, barely staying on the road and scaring Cam. She almost hits another car and crashes on the side of the road.

Lenora implores Cam not to leave her, then begins walking deeper into the woods, and Cam follows, to his chagrin. The two wind up at a gravesite and meet Aaron, who is shocked as Lenora appears to be the reincarnation of his wife who died nearly seventy-five years earlier; Lenora is stunned because she has seen Aaron in her visions.

Aaron takes them to his place, where they meet Esther. Aaron shows them his glasswork, which he compares to alchemy, adding that alchemists weren't really changing lead into gold, but, rather, changing themselves.

Lenora tells them about her visions, and Aaron confirms that they were real. Aaron and Esther disclose that Esther is Aaron's daughter, and that Aaron doesn't age due to being cursed by the magician DelGatto.

After Lenora and cam leave, borrowing Aaron's truck, Aaron goes outside and sees a vision of Anna before transforming into his more animal-like self. Summoned by Esther's spell earlier, two demons emerge through a glowing portal, while a third fails to emerge.

After hitting one of the demons with the truck, Cam gets out to inspect the roadkill before proceeding with his drive.

Back at the cabin, Esther cowers in fear as a demon tries to get in. Meanwhile, Aaron begins smashing things with a rod in the attic. Esther goes up to investigate, trips, and impales herself on another rod.

Cam stops driving when they come to a car in the road, and a demon smashes through the passenger-side window, grabbing Lenora. Cam reaches for a weapon and stabs the demon's arm, which then releases the screaming Lenora. Cam consoles her, then gets out of the truck to investigate the stopped car that is blocking their path, and grabs a tire iron from its trunk. The coast clear, he gets Lenora to come with him to continue their escape through the woods on foot.

When Aaron's animal quality fades, he sees Esther dying on the floor, and apologizes to her mournfully. She tells him that it was not his fault and assured him that he'll be free at dawn when the doorway closes. Aaron looks out through the window and says, “Anna.”

Elsewhere in the woods, a red orb flies at Cam and a demon grabs Lenora from behind. Cam smashes its head in with the tire iron and the two humans flee. Presently, a demon attacks Cam from behind. Cam fights back, smashing its head also in with the tire iron.

When a creepy voice in the woods says “Anna,” Lenora immediately begins walking somnambulistically toward it, leaving Cam behind on the ground. She returns to the gravesite, sees the glowing doorway through which the demons emerged, and goes through it, where she sees DelGatto waiting for Anna; on this other side, the skies are dark red and lit by continual lightning.

DelGatto kisses Lenora, but when he calls her Anna a second time, Lenora corrects him, reporting that Anna is dead. DelGatto insists that she is Anna, and that all he wants from her is her love.

Cam and Aaron both come upon the demonic doorway, and both go in after Lenora. Aaron says to DelGatto that the latter is not going to take her from him again, to which DelGatto responds that she is already his. Aaron attacks DelGatto, but this time, does not err with his blade, and stabs DelGatto in the stomach.

“You’re the animal now!” Aaron says. “You’ll take this curse and set me free!”

As DelGatto is lying on the ground dying, he says to Cam, “You shifted the balance!” DelGatto now apparently dead, Lenora comes to, and she flees with Cam back through the doorway; Aaron follows.

Standing by the glowing doorway, Aaron tells Lenora that she will now be safe, and kisses her. Suddenly, the not-yet-dead DelGatto reaches through the glow and grabs Lenora, but Cam pulls her away from him. DelGatto yowls in pain, and the white glow of the door turns into a reddish Hellscape. As the portal disappears, DelGatto is bisected; only his torso, arms, and head remain in our world.

Cam holds Lenora in his arms. Lenora asks where Aaron is, and they see Aaron on the ground, finally able to die, his curse having been broken. Aaron's face melts away then turns to dust and starts blowing away. “The trade set him free,” explains Cam. “No,” replies Lenora, “Aaron set himself free.” The film ends with the two survivors walking off through the woods, Cam's arm around Lenora's shoulder.

== Cast ==
- Robert Ginty as Aaron McCallum, a cursed man
- Lucinda Dooling (credited as Lucinda Dooline) as Lenora Sinclair, a former waitress who's having visions, is inexplicably drawn toward Aaron, and looks exactly like Aaron's long-dead wife, Anna M. McCallum (also played by Dooling)
- John Sanderford as Cam Rawlins, a hitchhiker who has the misfortune of being picked up by Lenora and figuratively dragged along by her
- Viola Kates Stimpson (credited as Viola Kate Stimpson) as Esther McCallum, an elderly woman and daughter of Aaron who wishes to help him by using witchcraft trade her soul for his
- Robert Glaudini as DelGatto, a malevolent magician who fell in love with Aaron's wife, Anna McCallum, and placed an enchantment on her
- Tony Abatemarco as a demon
- Billy Scudder as a demon

== Production and release ==
The Alchemist was made in 1981, but not released until 1984 (in Norway, on video) and May 31, 1985, in USA. Band was brought in to replace the original director, who had completed 2–3 days of filming.

The film was released for the only time on DVD by Video International on January 7, 2008.

== Reception ==
VideoHound's Golden Movie Retriever awarded the film a WOOF!, their lowest rating for a film, calling it "painfully routine". Richard Scheib on his film review website Moria.co awarded the film a half a star out of five, calling it "dull", and panned the film's slow-paced direction, and ineffective special effects. Variety called it "a dull, old-fashioned (with gore added) supernatural horror film". Time Out called it a "spectacularly low-energy multi-pastiche".

The film's score, by Richard Band, received some praise, with Thomas S. Hischak in his book The Encyclopedia of Film Composers calling it "satisfying" and remarking on the "elegant main theme", and the book Contemporary North American Film Directors: A Wallflower Critical Guide describing it as "a far better score than [the film] requires or deserves".
