= Vampire Assassin =

- Directed by: Ron Hall
- Written by: Ron Hall
- Produced by: Ron Hall; David Huey; Jesse Kitten
- Starring: Ron Hall; Mel Novak; Gerald Okamura; Rudy Ray Moore
- Cinematography: Ed Tillman
- Distributed by: Lions Gate Entertainment
- Release date: August 9, 2005
- Running time: 90 minutes
- Country: United States
- Language: English

Vampire Assassin is a 2005 direct-to-DVD film directed, written by, and starring martial artist Ron Hall. The film is notable for its cameo from Rudy Ray Moore in one of his final roles.

== Plot ==
When protagonist Derek Washington (Hall) was just a child, he witnessed his father's murder. Because of this, he became very afraid of blood. However, when a sting operation to find a counterfeiter named Gustoff Slovak (Mel Novak) goes wrong, Derek is forced to face his fear: blood. The operation backfires, resulting in a massacre that leaves Derek's team wiped out. Derek reaches the shocking conclusion that Slovak is actually a vampire, and joins forces with a weapons expert named Master Kao (Gerald Okamura). Kao is the last in a long line of vampire hunters, and agrees to train Derek in this ancient art of vampire slaying. However, in order to defeat Slovak, Derek must become a vampire assassin.
