= Ash and Bone =

2022 film directed by Harley Wallen

- Directed by: Harley Wallen
- Written by: Bret Miller
- Produced by: Harley Wallen; Nancy Oeswein; Angelina Danielle Cama; Annette Cama; Lexi Eve Cama; John Lepper; Adam Whitton; Kaiti Wallen; Joseph Williamson
- Starring: Jamie Bernadette; Angelina Danielle Cama; Kaiti Wallen; Harley Wallen; Mel Novak
- Cinematography: Alex Gasparetto
- Edited by: Alex Gasparetto
- Music by: Simone Cilio
- Production companies: Painted Creek Productions; Cama Productions; Auburn Moon Productions
- Distributed by: Deskpop Entertainment
- Release date: October 4, 2022
- Running time: 97 minutes
- Country: United States
- Language: English

Ash and Bone is a 2022 American horror thriller film directed by Harley Wallen. It stars Jamie Bernadette, Angelina Danielle Cama, Kaiti Wallen, Mel Novak, and Harley Wallen.

== Plot ==
Rebellious teenager Cassie Vanderbilt is brought by her father Lucas and stepmother Sarah to a remote Michigan lake town. She learns of deranged siblings Clete and May McKinley, rumored to murder young women from their isolated farmhouse.

After Cassie and two locals break in and uncover evidence of killings, the McKinleys target the family, escalating the trip into a violent struggle for survival.

== Cast ==
- Jamie Bernadette as Anna Lambeth
- Angelina Danielle Cama as Cassie Vanderbilt
- Kaiti Wallen as Sarah Vanderbilt
- Harley Wallen as Lucas Vanderbilt
- Erika Hoveland as May McKinley
- Jimmy Doom as Clete McKinley
- Mel Novak as Bartender Louie
- Calhoun Koenig as Tina

== Production ==
The film was directed and co-produced by Harley Wallen. Principal photography took place in rural Michigan, using local locations including a real abandoned farmhouse.

Jamie Bernadette replaced Scout Taylor-Compton in the role of Anna after Taylor-Compton was initially cast in May 2019.

== Release ==
The film was released on digital and VOD platforms on October 4, 2022, with a limited theatrical release beginning October 14, 2022.

== Reception ==
On review aggregator Rotten Tomatoes, the film holds an approval rating of 100% based on 5 reviews. Bobby LePire of Film Threat gave it a 8.5 out of 10. Michael DeFellipo of Horror Society rated it 8/10.

== Sequel ==
A sequel, Ash and Bone - Part II, was announced and entered pre-production in 2023.

== Accolades ==
Year	Award	Category	Recipient(s)	Result	Ref.
2021	Fright Night Film Fest	Best Feature Film (Slasher)	Ash and Bone	Nominated	
