= The Devil's Left Hand =

2023 film directed by Harley Wallen

- Directed by: Harley Wallen
- Written by: Harley Wallen
- Produced by: Harley Wallen; Joseph Williamson; Nancy Oeswein
- Starring: Laurene Landon; Yan Birch; Kaiti Wallen; Harley Wallen
- Cinematography: Michael Kettenbeil
- Edited by: Alex Gasparetto
- Music by: Bon Lucas
- Production companies: Painted Creek Productions; Auburn Moon Productions
- Distributed by: Lion Heart Distribution
- Release date: July 1, 2023
- Running time: 98 minutes
- Country: United States
- Language: English

The Devil's Left Hand is a 2023 American horror thriller mystery film written and directed by Harley Wallen. It stars Laurene Landon, Kaiti Wallen, Yan Birch, and Harley Wallen. Originally released in 2019 as Agramon's Gate, the film was re-edited and retitled for its 2023 wide release.

== Plot ==
At a housewarming party in Pontiac, Michigan for young couple Richie (Kris Reilly) and Cassidy Stann (Kaiti Wallen), their friend Vesna (Aphrodite Nikolovski), a medium, conducts a séance. This unleashes the demon Agramon, which possesses Vesna and begins stalking and killing the guests while shape-shifting to impersonate them.

Richie's childhood trauma—shooting his abusive father at age 12 to save his mother—resurfaces as poltergeist activity escalates. The group fights back amid paranoia, leading to a climactic confrontation blending exorcism and personal redemption.

== Cast ==
- Laurene Landon as Mother Stann
- Yan Birch as Father Stann
- Kaiti Wallen as Cassidy
- Harley Wallen as Zebula
- Kris Reilly as Richie Stann
- Calhoun Koenig as Agramon
- Aphrodite Nikolovski as Miss Vesna

== Production ==
The film was produced by Painted Creek Productions and Auburn Moon Productions. Principal photography took place in Pontiac, Michigan. Originally released in 2019 as Agramon's Gate, it was re-edited and expanded for its 2023 release.

== Release ==
The film was released on July 1, 2023, on VOD and Digital.

== Reception ==
On review aggregator Rotten Tomatoes, the film holds an approval rating of 100% based on 5 reviews. The film was featured in a Collider article listing the highest-rated horror movies of the past decade with perfect Tomatometer scores.

== See also ==
- List of horror films of 2023
- List of thriller films of the 2020s
