= Gangsters Incorporated =

- Directed by: William Lee
- Written by: William Lee
- Produced by: Sherrie Allyn; Jason Schierloh
- Starring: Mel Novak; Joe Estevez; Shawn C. Phillips; William Lee; Corum Sanford
- Cinematography: Ed Zirkle
- Music by: Kevin MacLeod
- Release date: November 30, 2015
- Running time: 134 minutes
- Country: United States
- Language: English

Gangsters Incorporated, also known as Bad Fellaz, is a 2015 American action comedy film directed and written by William Lee. It stars Mel Novak and Joe Estevez.

== Plot ==
Vinny Vincenzo (William Lee), an extremely intelligent, ruthless and tough gangster who joins the mob and works and fights his way up the ranks to be bestowed the title of the first African-American Don. His Daily Struggles to maintain his power while fighting off FBI official Stick (Mel Novak) are chronicled.

== Cast ==
- Mel Novak as Stick
- Joe Estevez as The Vice President
- Shawn C. Phillips as Jacky Jackster
- William Lee as Vinny Vincenzo
- Corum Sanford as EJ McFlame
- Steve Guynn as Eddie
- William Wreggelsworth as Tommy Patrone
- Angela D. Williams as Alexis Sekone
