= Impossible.com =

Impossible
- Industry: Design firm
- Founded: 2013
- Founder: Lily Cole
- Key people: Lily Cole, Kwame Ferreira
- Owner: I AM POSSIBLE Limited
- Number of employees: 70+ (2018)
- Website: www.impossible.com

Impossible is an innovation group and incubator. It started as a gift economy platform created by Lily Cole in 2013, and since then has expanded to other areas, mainly design and technology. Impossible claims to be working on client projects with potentially far-reaching impacts.

== Impossible People ==
Impossible People (previously Impossible.com) is an altruism-based mobile app which invites people to give their services and skills away to help others. Created by Lily Cole, the app allows users to post something they would like to do or need so that others can grant their wish. In May 2013, Cole presented the app's beta in conjunction with the support of Wikipedia co-founder Jimmy Wales at a special event at Cambridge University. It is the first Yunus social business in the UK. The project became open source in March 2017.

== Funding and support ==
In the past, the Impossible.com gift economy project received a grant of £200,000 from the Cabinet Office’s Innovation in Giving fund. Other investors include Lily Cole herself and boyfriend and Impossible's co-founder, Kwame Ferreira. Donations of services from Muhammad Yunus, Brian Boylan, chairman of Wolff Olins, Tea Uglow, creative director for Google’s Creative Lab, office space and "angel investor" role from Jimmy Wales, and legal services from Herbert Smith Freehills bolstered the social network.
