= Death of a Brewer =

- Directed by: Mokotsi Rukundo
- Written by: Mokotsi Rukundo
- Based on: Beer Money: A Tale of the Iowa City Beer Mafia by S.C. “Steve” Sherman
- Produced by: Keli Price
- Starring: Jefferson White; Crispin Glover; Mena Suvari; Tyler Posey
- Cinematography: Bruce James Bales
- Music by: Simone Cilio
- Country: United States
- Language: English

Death of a Brewer is an upcoming American thriller drama film written and directed by Mokotsi Rukundo and starring Jefferson White, Crispin Glover, Mena Suvari and Tyler Posey. It is based on S.C. “Steve” Sherman’s 2020 novel Beer Money: A Tale of the Iowa City Beer Mafia.

== Synopsis ==
In 1884, the conflict between a brewing empire and a temperance movement forces a young doctor to confront his morals.

== Cast ==
- Jefferson White as Joe Lund
- Crispin Glover as J.J. Engelbert
- Mena Suvari as Vernice Armstrong
- Tyler Posey as James Swafford
- Andy Dispensa as Teddy Miller
- Sydney Pierick as Matilda Jones
- Mickey O’Sullivan as Tom Curran
- Adam Joel as Iowa Republic Reporter

== Production ==
Filming occurred in Iowa and Illinois in August 2025.
