= Hy Pyke =

American actor

- Born: Monty Pike; December 2, 1935; Los Angeles, California, U.S.
- Died: October 26, 2006 (aged 70); Los Angeles, California, U.S.
- Occupation: Actor
- Years active: 1973–2003

Hy Pyke (born Monty Pike, December 2, 1935 – October 26, 2006) was an American character actor.

== Biography ==
Pyke was born in Los Angeles, California, the son of vaudevillian David Pike and his wife Pauline. Pyke majored in theatre at UCLA in the 1960s, appearing in numerous student films, including one for Ray Manzarek, keyboard player of The Doors, called Induction (1965), which also featured the Doors' vocalist Jim Morrison in a brief role. During that time period, Pyke was also associated with actor Del Close.

== Career ==
After graduating from UCLA, Pyke began his career as a character actor in low-budget and independent films. Pyke also has a small part in the John Milius film Dillinger (1973). Although many of his better known films are in the horror genre, Pyke acted in everything from blaxploitation to musical comedies. He had a uniquely manic acting style, with a penchant for exaggerated physical comedy, marked by a distinctive, raspy voice.

Besides his film work, Pyke acted in theater, musical revues, etc.

During the 1970s, Pyke appeared in the 1975 horror film Lemora: A Child's Tale of the Supernatural, Dolemite (1975), The First Nudie Musical (1976) and Spawn of the Slithis (1978). Pyke played the part of Bebe Rebozo in the Richard Nixon satire White House Madness.

Pyke became more known for his role as Taffey Lewis in the science fiction movie Blade Runner (1982). Other noteworthy 1980s appearances include the teen comedy film Bad Manners (1984), starring Martin Mull and Karen Black, and the horror comedy film Vamp (1986), starring Grace Jones. Towards the end of the 1980s, Pyke's acting career slowed down and he began acting in television commercials. His last movie role was in the low-budget, straight-to-video 1988 horror film Hack-O-Lantern.

Pyke last lived in Los Angeles, performing as a nightclub comedian after surviving quadruple bypass surgery. In 2004, he contributed to a book about obscure 1970s genre films, Gods in Polyester, reminiscing on Lemora, Dolemite and others, in a style very much in tune with his on-screen persona. Pyke also contributed pieces on Blade Runner and Hack-O-Lantern to the book Gods In Spandex, A Survivor's Account of 80's Cinema Obscura (2007), a sequel to Gods In Polyester. He was also interviewed for an E! True Hollywood Story episode on David Carradine in 2000. Pyke's final film appearance was in Dealing, released posthumously in 2012.

== Partial filmography ==
- Lemora: A Child's Tale of the Supernatural (1975) - The Bus Driver
- Dolemite (1975) - Mayor Daley
- White House Madness (1975) - B.B. Reboza
- The First Nudie Musical (1976) - Benny
  - Pyke plays the singing and dancing Uncle Benny, one of the financial backers of the First Nudie Musical. He appears in a few key scenes in the beginning of the film, and later makes brief appearances until the end. One of the stars of the film is Cindy Williams of Laverne & Shirley fame.
- The Erotic Adventures of Don Quixote (aka When Sex Was a Knightly Affair) (1976) - Sancho Panza
- Hollywood High (1976) - Mr. Flowers
- Nightmare in Blood (1977) - Harris
- Ziegfeld: The Man and His Women (1978) - Unnamed
  - A TV movie on the life of Florenz Ziegfeld; Pyke's only television acting credit outside of commercials.
- Spawn of the Slithis (1978) - Jack Dunn
- Every Girl Should Have One (1978) - Willie
- Smokey and the Judge (1980) - Club Owner / Mr. Kuntz
- Blade Runner (1982) - Taffey Lewis
- Bad Manners (aka: Growing Pains) (1984) - Mr. Slatt
- Vamp (1986) - Desk Clerk
- Hack-O-Lantern (aka Halloween Night) (aka The Damning) (1988) - Grandpa
- Fatal Choice (1995) - Mickey
- Living Luminaries (The Serious Business Of Happiness) (2007/Gotham Metro Studios)
- Dealing (2012) - Hy
  - Final film role, released posthumously

== Bibliography ==
- Gods In Polyester, or, A Survivors' Account of 70's Cinema Obscura (2004/Succubus Press)

– Pyke contributed pieces on Lemora, The First Nudie Musical, Spawn of the Slithis, Dolemite, The Erotic Adventures of Don Quixote and Nightmare in Blood.

- Gods In Spandex, or, A Survivors' Account of 80's Cinema Obscura (2007/Succubus Press)

– Pyke contributed pieces on Blade Runner and Hack-O-Lantern.
