= Goran Kostić =

Bosnian actor

- Горан Костић
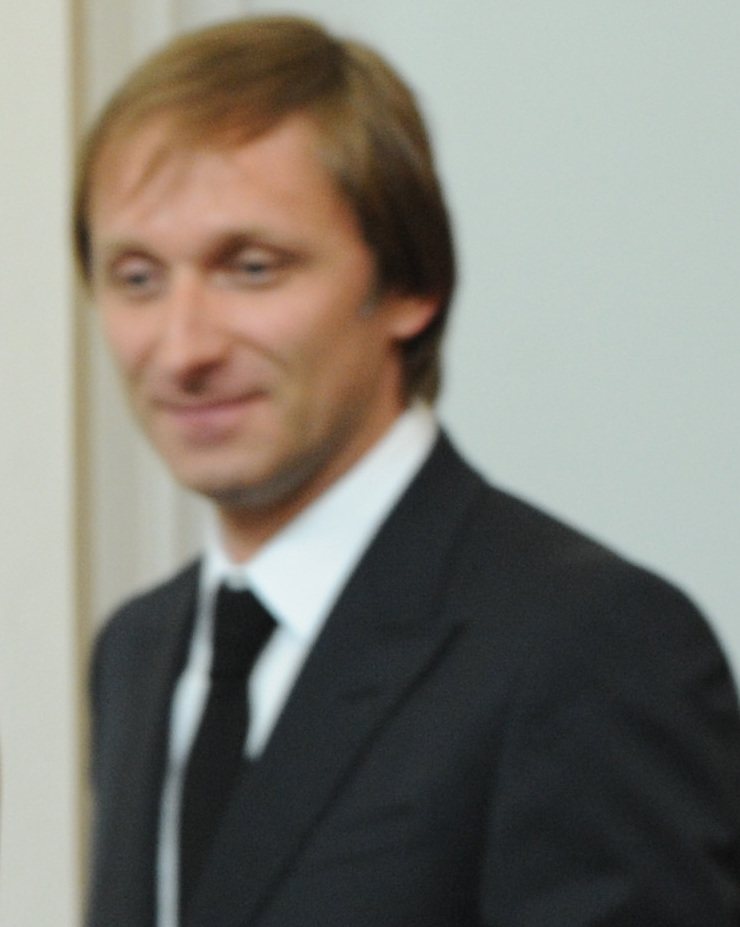
- Kostić in 2012
- Born: 18 November 1971 (age 54); Sarajevo, SR Bosnia and Herzegovina, Yugoslavia
- Occupation: Actor
- Years active: 1995–present

Goran Kostić (Serbian Cyrillic: Горан Костић, born 18 November 1971) is a Bosnian actor based in the United Kingdom. He has appeared in supporting roles in a number of Hollywood films.

== Early life ==
Kostić was born on 18 November 1971 to an ethnic Serb family in Sarajevo, Socialist Republic of Bosnia and Herzegovina, Yugoslavia.

== Career ==
He is an actor and producer, appearing in Taken (2008), and Hannibal Rising (2007).

In 2007, he played the Polish builder Erek in the BBC soap opera EastEnders. He appears as Pavel, a Russian PhD student moonlighting as the campus security officer in New Tricks Series 7, episode 2, "It Smells of Books".

He co-starred in Angelina Jolie's 2011 film In the Land of Blood and Honey about the Bosnian war where he plays Danijel, a Serb policeman. The film was Jolie's directorial debut.

== Filmography ==
Film roles
| Year | Title | Role | Notes |
|---|---|---|---|
| 1997 | Career Girls | Student | Uncredited |
| 2001 | The Fourth Angel | Voice | Uncredited |
| 2003 | Inside Outside Lydia's Head | Zoltan | |
| 2004 | The Face at the Window | Davor | |
| 2005 | The Truth About Love | Chris Webb | |
| 2005 | Benjamin's Struggle | SS Guard 1 | Short film |
| 2006 | Children of Men | Bexhill Market Hustler | |
| 2007 | Hannibal Rising | Kazys 'Pot Watcher' Porvik | |
| 2007 | Extraordinary Rendition | Radovan | |
| 2007 | The Hunting Party | Srdjan | |
| 2008 | Taken | Gregor | |
| 2008 | The Crew | Lepi | |
| 2009 | L'aide au Retour | Miroslav | Short film |
| 2009 | Wish 143 | Milan | Short film |
| 2010 | The Duel | Voice | |
| 2010 | Of Gods and Men | Le Chef de Chantier | |
| 2010 | Caged | Le Serb Prisonnier | |
| 2011 | In the Land of Blood and Honey | Danijel | |
| 2013 | The Last Days on Mars | Marko Petrovic | |
| 2015 | Orion | Magician | |
| 2015 | Hiljadarka (Thousand) | Rudar - zafrkant | |
| 2016 | The Zookeeper's Wife | Mr. Kinszerbaum | |
| 2018 | Ant-Man and the Wasp | Anitolov | |
| 2024 | When Santa Was a Communist | Merdzo | |
| 2024 | Canary Black | Konrad Breznov | |

Television roles
| Year | Title | Role | Notes |
|---|---|---|---|
| 1995 | Ghostbusters of East Finchley | Claus | 1 episode |
| 1998 | Out of Hours | Misha | Miniseries |
| 2001 | Sword of Honour | Voice | TV movie; uncredited |
| 2001 | Always and Everyone | Voice | 1 episode |
| 2001 | Table 12 | Rose Seller | Episode: "Aphrodisiac"; uncredited |
| 2001 | Band of Brothers | Prisoner with Corpse | Miniseries; Episode: "Why We Fight" |
| 2001 | Randall and Hopkirk (Deceased) | Sergei | Episode: "The Glorious Butranekh" |
| 2001 | The Bill | Milos | Episode: "Paint it Black" |
| 2002 | Ultimate Force | Eli | Episode: "Breakout" |
| 2003 | Casualty | Sali | Episode: "Flight" |
| 2003 | Final Demand | Cheddar | TV movie |
| 2003 | Days That Shook the World | Gavrilo Princip (voice) | Episode: "The Assassination of Archduke Ferdinand/The Death of Hitler" |
| 2003-2004 | Grease Monkeys | Ezekiel | Main cast |
| 2004 | Red Cap | Voice | Episode: "Betrayed"; uncredited |
| 2004 | Sex Traffic | Voice | Miniseries; uncredited |
| 2004 | Foyle's War | Jan Komorowski | Episode: "The French Drop" |
| 2004 | Murder Prevention | Paul Whitley | 3 episodes |
| 2004 | The Bill | Zacchadeli | 2 episodes |
| 2005 | Sea of Souls | Voice | 2 episodes; uncredited |
| 2005 | Comedy Lab | Ivan | Episode: "Speeding" |
| 2005 | Spooks | Bodyguard | Episode: "Road Trip" |
| 2006 | Ultimate Force | Sgt. Pudovkin | Episode: "The Changing of the Guard" |
| 2006 | Afterlife | David | Episode: "Mirrorball" |
| 2007 | EastEnders | Erek | 6 episodes |
| 2009 | The Bill | Marek Jankowski | 2 episodes |
| 2010 | The Deep | Zubov | Miniseries; 3 episodes |
| 2010 | New Tricks | Pavel Illich | Episode: "It Smells Like Books" |
| 2012 | Covert Affairs | Alexei Vershinin | Episode: "Rock 'n' Roll Suicide" |
| 2014 | The Assets | Victor Cherkashin | Miniseries; 5 episodes |
| 2015 | Legends | Ivanenko | 3 episodes |
| 2018 | Bliss | Vladislav | Main cast |
| 2018 | Genius | Lvovich | Episode: "Picasso: Chapter Seven" |
| 2018 | Jack Ryan | Ansor Dudayev | Recurring |

Video game roles
| Year | Title | Role | Notes |
|---|---|---|---|
| 1996 | Command & Conquer: Red Alert | Russian Officer | |
| 2002 | Hitman 2: Silent Assassin | Additional voices | Uncredited |
| 2008 | Command & Conquer: Red Alert 3 | Russian Officer | |
