= Lucinda Dooling =

American actor (1954–2015)

- Born: Lucinda Valles; April 19, 1954; Puerto Rico
- Died: December 30, 2015 (aged 61); Pacific Palisades, Los Angeles, United States
- Other names: Lucinda Schiff
- Occupations: Actress; interior designer
- Years active: 1979–1991
- Known for: Lovely But Deadly; The Alchemist; Surf II

Lucinda Schiff (née Valles) (April 19, 1954 – December 30, 2015), better known by her stage name Lucinda Dooling, was a Puerto Rico-born American actor. She was best known for her roles in the films Lovely But Deadly (1981), The Alchemist (1981), and Surf II (1984). She also appeared in several television movies and series.

== Career ==
Schiff was born Lucinda Valles in Puerto Rico in 1954 to a Puerto Rican father and an Irish-American mother. Her parents split up when she was a child, and after the death of her mother in 1969, she relocated to New York City to live with her father, who threw her out when she was 18.

She made her film debut in Steven Spielberg's 1979 film 1941, followed by a role in a television adaptation of The Merry Wives of Windsor. Her first starring role came in the 1981 film Lovely But Deadly, playing the lead role of Mary Ann "Lovely" Lovitt, and in the same year she starred opposite Robert Ginty in The Alchemist, which didn't see release until two years later. Her final film role was in the 1984 film Surf II (as Lindy Sue).

In the 1980s she appeared in popular television shows such as Nero Wolfe, Hart to Hart, Three's Company, and The Thorn Birds, as well as roles in TV movies Miracle On Ice (1981), The Rules of Marriage (1982), Double Switch (1987), and Lies of the Children (1991, credited as Lucinda Schiff).

Schiff dated actor Richard Dreyfuss during the late 1970s and accompanied him to the Academy Awards ceremony in 1978 when he won his Best Actor Oscar for The Goodbye Girl.

She gave up her acting career in the early 1990s, subsequently working as an interior designer. She married film executive David Schiff in 1980, with whom she had three children.

After a 15-year-long battle with recurring brain tumors, Schiff died on December 30, 2015. She was 61.
