= Lovely But Deadly =

- Theatrical release poster
- Directed by: David Sheldon
- Written by: Lawrence D. Foldes; Patricia Joyce; David Sheldon
- Produced by: Doro Vlado Hreljanovic; David Sheldon
- Starring: Lucinda Dooling; John Randolph; Mel Novak; Richard Herd; Susan Mechsner; Marie Windsor; Mary Elizabeth McDonough
- Edited by: Richard S. Brummer
- Music by: Robert O. Ragland
- Production company: Elmtree Productions
- Distributed by: Juniper Releasing
- Release date: 1981
- Running time: 93 minutes
- Country: United States
- Language: English

Lovely But Deadly is a 1981 action film about a cheerleader who goes undercover to fight drug dealers. The film stars Lucinda Dooling, John Randolph, Mel Novak, and Richard Herd.

Directed by David Sheldon with a story by Lawrence D. Foldes, the film follows Mary Ann "Lovely" Lovitt (Dooling), who goes back to high school to find the drug pushers that she holds responsible for the death of her brother, who died from an overdose.

The film features several fight scenes, with Lovitt using kung fu to deal with an array of villains.

It was subsequently released on VHS by Vestron Video.

== Cast ==
- Lucinda Dooling as Mary Ann Lovitt
- John Randolph as Franklin Van Dyke
- Mel Novak as Warren Lang
- Susan Mechsner as Suzie
- Richard Herd as Charley "Honest Charley" Gilmarten
- Irwin Keyes as Gommorah

== Reception ==
Daniel R. Budnik, in his book 80s Action Movies on the Cheap, calls the film "enjoyable" but "schizophrenic", stating "the film's style changes so much there could be ten directors involved". Shock Cinema called it an "amusingly braindead romp".
