= Jimmy Doom =

Detroit author and actor

Jimmy Doom (born c.1965) is an American writer and actor who was born in New York, New York and went on to help revitalize the Detroit punk scene in the mid-1980s. Doom currently has thousands of subscribers to the daily fiction he has published online for more than three years. To date he has published two books of short stories, Humans, Being: A Story a Day for a Year (2020) and That Fountain Ain't Gonna Grant Your Wish (2023). He remains a vital touchstone in the Detroit Music and Art scene and serves as an ambassador for new, old, and underground creatives.

Jimmy Doom helped create the Detroit Punk scene in the 1980s and his writing has been published by major Metropolitan Detroit news outlets for more than 30 years including The Detroit Free Press, The Detroit Metro Times, Orbit Magazine. He currently writes and publishes a daily piece of short fiction online.

== Early life and education ==
Jimmy Doom was born James Kenneth Abraham to Molly Abraham in 1966. His mother moved to Detroit, Michigan when he was two months old and he was raised on the West Side of the city. Molly later married James Kenneth Graham. James’s birth certificate was later changed to Graham reflecting his adoption by his stepfather.

Doom graduated from the University of Detroit Jesuit High School and Academy in 1983.

== Music and acting career ==
=== Almightly Lumberjacks of Death (ALD) ===
In 1987, Doom was selected as the lead vocalist of the punk band The Almighty Lumberjacks of Death (ALD), replacing the original singer Danny Mason. With ALD, Doom wrote the lyrics on the 1989 5-song EP Always Out of Control But Never Out of Beer on Force Majeure Records. In response to that performance, writer Paul Zimmerman invited Doom to audition for his film Grummy. The film was never completed as Zimmerman accepted a position at Flynt Publications in LA. At a show at St. Andrew's Hall in 1991, independent film director Kevin King offered Doom a role in the short film "Whatever Happens is Good."

=== Acting ===
After the breakup of ALD and a layoff from American Axle, where he worked on an assembly line, Doom attended open auditions at the Motion Picture Institute of Michigan. He was offered roles in various student productions, including The Horsemen.

Doom's role in The Horsemen led to a role in Doug Schulze's Dark Fields opposite David Carradine. Dozens of film and music video roles followed, including the role of Motorcycle Club Leader Biker Bill in Kill the Irishman. Additional movie credits include appearances in The Good Thief, Ovid and the Art of Love, Division 19, and Orion. Doom also served as brand ambassador for the Detroit beer Altes as the Easter Bunny.

Doom can be seen playing Clete McKinley in the 2022 award-winning thriller Ash and Bone. He is slated to appear as Johnny in the independent film Eden: Where Love Wasn't Supposed to Be. Recently, Doom appeared as "Bum" in Mike Young's 2024 film Stealing Jokes .

== Writing career ==
Doom's first published piece was in the Detroit Free Press Sunday Magazine and The Detroit Metro Times titled "Underground Rock," which was inspired by the funeral of Cold as Life vocalist Rodney Barger, aka Rawn Beauty. He then wrote freelance entertainment pieces for the Detroit Free Press, Real Detroit, The Detroit Metro Times, and Orbit. At Orbit, he was named Fine Food Editor.

After writing a series of flash fiction pieces on Medium, Doom released a book of drabbles called Humans, Being: A Story a Day for a Year on Dec 1, 2020. Doom's second book, That Fountain Ain't Gonna Grant Your Wish, a collection of 62 longer-form short stories, was published on August 9, 2023. On October 17, 2023 he interviewed on air and read one story from his second book on CBS Detroit.

Doom publishes short stories daily online where he has amassed an archive of over 1,640 pieces of short fiction as well as videos of the author reading stories and sharing autobiographical material.
