= Harley Wallen =

American film director

Harley (Mikael) Wallèn
- Born: November 4, ? Malmö, Sweden
- Occupations: Actor; writer; director; producer
- Years active: 1987–present

Harley (Mikael) Wallèn (born November 4, ?) is a Swedish-American actor, writer and director. He is best known for his work on the films Betrayed, Bennett's Song and Ash and Bone.

== Life and career ==
Wallen was born in Sweden and started training in martial arts when he was seven years old. He had his first opportunity in acting as a dancer at the Swedish television program Solstollarna. He later moved to the United States to pursue his career in acting. He is the founder of Painted Creek Productions. He is married to actress Kaiti Wallen.

== Filmography ==
Year	Film	Writer	Director	Producer	Notes
2023	Beneath Us All	✗	✓	✓	
2023	The Devil's Left Hand	✓	✓	✓	
2022	Ash and Bone	✗	✓	✓	
2019	Abstruse	✓	✓	✓	
2019	Eternal Code	✓	✓	✓	
2018	Betrayed	✓	✓	✓	
2018	Bennett's Song	✗	✓	✓	
2017	Moving Parts	✓	✓	✓	
2017	My Breaking Point	✓	✓	✓	Short Film
2016	Deceitful	✓	✓	✓	
2015	Set Me Free	✓	✓	✓	Short Film
2015	Broken	✓	✓	✗	Walbert Beltran (co-director)
2014	Donate or Else	✓	✓	✗	Short Film

As Actor

- 2023 - Beneath Us All
- 2023 - The Devil's Left Hand
- 2022 - Ash and Bone
- 2019 - Abstruse
- 2019 - Eternal Code
- 2018 - Betrayed
- 2018 - Halt: The Motion Picture
- 2018 - Bennett's Song
- 2018 - Love Espionage: Spy Revenge
- 2017 - Georgy
- 2017 - Moving Parts
- 2017 - Pimps, Pastors, & Politicians
- 2017 - Stay
- 2017 - KNIGHTMARE
- 2017 - My Breaking Point
- 2016 - An American Abroad
- 2016 - Daylight
- 2016 - I Declare War
- 2016 - Indictment: Dead Witnesses Can't Talk
- 2016 - Model No. Human
- 2016 - Deceitful
- 2015 - Psychology of Murder
- 2015 - Ten Zero Zero
- 2015 - A Matter of Time
- 2015 - Set Me Free
- 2015 - Broken
- 2015 - Random
- 2014 - Number One Contender
- 2014 - Social Path
- 2013 - Love Interest
- 2011 - WXC Web Series
- 2008-2009 - Xtreme Cagefighting Championship
- 2009 - XCC on MyTV20
- 2009 - Cage Combat MMA
- 2008 - Donofrio MMA
- 1987 - Solstollarna

== Awards and nominations ==
Year	Result	Award	Category	Work
2018	Won	California Film Awards	Festival Award	Betrayed
2018	Won	Mexico International Film Festival	Special Jury Award	Bennett's Song
2017	Won	Nevada International Film Festival	Special Jury Award	Abstruse
