= Lemora =

1975 film by Richard Blackburn

- Theatrical release poster
- Directed by: Richard Blackburn
- Written by: Richard Blackburn
- Produced by: Robert Fern
- Starring: Cheryl Smith; Hy Pyke; Lesley Gilb; Richard Blackburn
- Cinematography: Robert Caramico
- Edited by: Pieter Hubbard
- Music by: Dan Neufeld
- Distributed by: Media Cinema Group
- Release date: April 30, 1973 (Claremont, California)
- Running time: 80 minutes (Note: The original cut of the film runs 113 minutes, but the theatrical cut released by Media Cinema Group runs 80 minutes. The cut of the film released on DVD by Synapse Films in 2004, titled Lemora: A Child's Tale of the Supernatural, is slightly longer than the theatrical cut, running 85 minutes in length.)
- Language: English
- Budget: $200,000

Lemora is a 1973 American Southern Gothic supernatural horror film written and directed by Richard Blackburn, and starring Cheryl Smith, Hy Pyke, and Lesley Gilb. It follows a young girl in the Prohibition-era Southern United States who travels to a mysterious rural town to visit her father and uncovers a coterie of vampires. The film was released under several alternate titles, including Lemora: A Child's Tale of the Supernatural, The Legendary Curse of Lemora, and Lemora, Lady Dracula.

Conceived by Blackburn, a former University of California, Los Angeles film student, Lemora was filmed on location in Pomona and surrounding areas. It had its premiere at Scripps College in April 1973, after which it was sold for distribution to Media Cinema Group, who cut the film by nearly forty minutes and released it theatrically in late 1974. The film was heavily criticized by the Catholic Legion of Decency, which deemed it "anti-Catholic."

== Plot ==
During the Prohibition era in the Southern United States, the devout 13-year-old Lila Lee is summoned by letter to visit her injured father, a gangster, before he dies. She runs away from the Reverend who has raised her and in whose church she has become well known as a singer, though her extraordinary beauty is beginning to attract attention as well. Lila boards a bus to her father's purported location, the strange town of Astaroth. At the bus station, the ticket salesman informs Lila that the people there are strange, and that visitors rarely return from the town. That night, the bus Lila is riding, in which she is the only passenger, is attacked by a band of mindless vampires as it approaches the woods surrounding Astaroth. The vampires kill the bus driver, and Lila crashes the bus while attempting to flee. She is attacked by the creatures, but rescued by a mysterious woman named Lemora.

When she regains consciousness, Lila finds herself locked in a cottage outside a farmhouse, where she is tended to by Solange, an elderly hag-like woman who feeds her. Lila attacks Solange and escapes the cottage, fleeing to the farmhouse where she hides in a crawlspace. She hears her father's voice from inside the home, but before she can find him, Lila is confronted by Lemora, who informs her she cannot see her father until she is immune to his "disease." Lila finds that Lemora boards numerous other children in her home, all of whom, like her, are pallid and sickly in appearance.

It becomes evident that Lemora highly covets Lila, bathing her and attempting to soothe her. While alone, Lila is violently attacked by her father, who appears severely mutated. He attacks Solange, killing her, before Lemora chases him away with a torch. Lemora explains that some of the townspeople of Astaroth have become sick, and refers to an impending ceremony in which Lila will participate. After reading a diary of a child in Lemora's home, she soon realizes the truth: Lemora is a vampire who feeds upon children and is holding her father captive. She is also the unofficial queen of the Astaroth vampires, and plans to turn Lila into one of her own.

While trying to escape, Lila embarks on a nighttime journey through the town of Astaroth, witnessing the two types of vampires: one faction is like Lemora herself, relatively human in behavior and appearance, while the others are mutated or perhaps regressed, far more feral in behavior and monstrous in form; and the two groups are at war. Meanwhile, the Reverend, who is seeking Lila, manages to retrace her steps.

After a climactic battle which leaves most of the vampires dead, Lila is forced to kill her own father. As she weeps over his corpse, Lemora approaches her and offers her comfort by her vampire's kiss. When the Reverend shows up not long after, he finds Lila willing, even eager to kiss him. He resists at first, then he gives in. That is when she drives her fangs into his throat and drains his blood, watched over by a smiling Lemora.

In the last scene, Lila is seen singing before her church congregation.

== Cast ==
- Richard Blackburn as The Reverend
- Cheryl Smith as Lila Lee
- William Whitton as Alvin Lee
- Steve Johnson as The Ticket Man
- Hy Pyke as The Bus Driver
- Lesley Taplin (billed as Lesley Gilb) as Lemora
- Maxine Ballantyne as Solange
- Parker West as Young Man

== Production ==
=== Concept ===
Lemora was conceived by former University of California, Los Angeles film students Richard Blackburn and Robert Fern. Their main inspiration in making the film was Bob Kelljan's 1970 film Count Yorga, Vampire.

=== Casting ===
Smith, seventeen years old at the time of filming, played thirteen-year-old Lila Lee, her first major role. Writer-director Blackburn appears in the film as The Reverend.

=== Filming ===
Principal photography of Lemora occurred in the fall of 1972 on a budget of $200,000, taking place in and around locations in Pomona, California, including the Phillips Mansion, which was used for the exteriors of Lemora's house, and the Bradbury Chateau Estate, where the interiors were shot. Additional photography took place at the San Dimas Hotel, and in an abandoned factory in Fontana. The Reverend's house was located at Culver Studios, on what was once part of the exterior set for Mayberry on The Andy Griffith Show. Several of Blackburn's family and friends had roles in the production.

== Release ==
Lemora had its premiere in Claremont, California, on April 30, 1973, at the Garrison Theater on the Scripps College campus. The audience response at this screening was allegedly so poor that Fern and Blackburn quickly sought to sell the film and recoup part of the money spent to produce it.

Media Cinema Group subsequently purchased distribution rights to the film, cutting its original runtime from 113 minutes to 80, and distributed it to drive-in theaters and local cinemas in the United States in 1974 under the title The Legendary Curse of Lemora. The film opened in McAllen, Texas in May 1974, followed by releases that October in Montgomery, Alabama and in Atlanta, Georgia in November. The film opened in the Phoenix, Arizona region on December 18, 1974.

=== Home media ===
The film was released on DVD by Synapse Films on August 31, 2004.

== Reception ==
=== Critical response ===
Lemora received mostly negative reviews upon its initial release, with some calling it "anti-Catholic".

Author and film critic Leonard Maltin awarded the film a "BOMB," his lowest rating, calling it a "Perfectly awful low budgeter." Elvis Mitchell from The New York Times wrote, "Lemora wants to surpass the expansions on vampire film mythology that propelled the fecund, tightly wound horror movies from Hammer Studios. The film falls far short of its goals, but it is a classic of sorts."

=== Modern assessment ===
On the internet film review aggregator Rotten Tomatoes, the film holds an approval rating of 86% based on 7 reviews, with a weighted average rating of 7.1/10. On Metacritic, which assigns a weighted average rating to reviews, the film has a score of 49 out of 100, based on 4 critics, indicating "mixed or average" reviews.

Barry Meyer from Film Monthly called Lemora "A real creeper", writing, "What makes this film work so well is that director-writer Richard Blackburn understands how to shock people with out exploiting the gimmickry of the genre, like so many other films of the era were so willing to do". In 1992, film writer John Flynn noted Lemora as "an artistic offbeat vampire movie which recalled the best of Bava and Bunuel."

Maitland McDonagh of TV Guide awarded the film 3 out of 5 stars, writing, "An art-house vampire movie with lesbian undertones, Richard Blackburn's debut film puts an ambitious and surprisingly effective spin on traditional vampire movie cliches." Dennis Schwartz from Ozus' World Movie Reviews gave the film a B+, calling it "A haunting and intelligently accomplished work".

== See also ==
- List of American films of 1975
- Vampire film

== Sources ==
- Flynn, John L. (1992). Cinematic Vampires: The Living Dead on Film and Television, from Devil's Castle (1896) to Bram Stoker's Dracula (1992). Jefferson, North Carolina: McFarland & Company. ISBN 978-0-899-50659-3.
- Hardy, Phil, ed. (1995). The Overlook Film Encyclopedia. Woodstock, New York: Overlook Press. ISBN 978-0-879-51624-6.
- Maltin, Leonard (2013). Leonard Maltin's 2014 Movie Guide. New York City, New York: Penguin. ISBN 978-1-101-60955-2.
- Hardy, Phil; Milne, Tom (1996). The Aurum Film Encyclopedia of Horror (Second ed.). London, England: Aurum Press. ISBN 978-1-854-10384-0.
- Smith, Gary A. (2017). Vampire Films of the 1970s: Dracula to Blacula and Every Fang Between. Jefferson, North Carolina: McFarland & Company. ISBN 978-1-476-62559-1.
