= Aische Pervers =

German pornographic actress

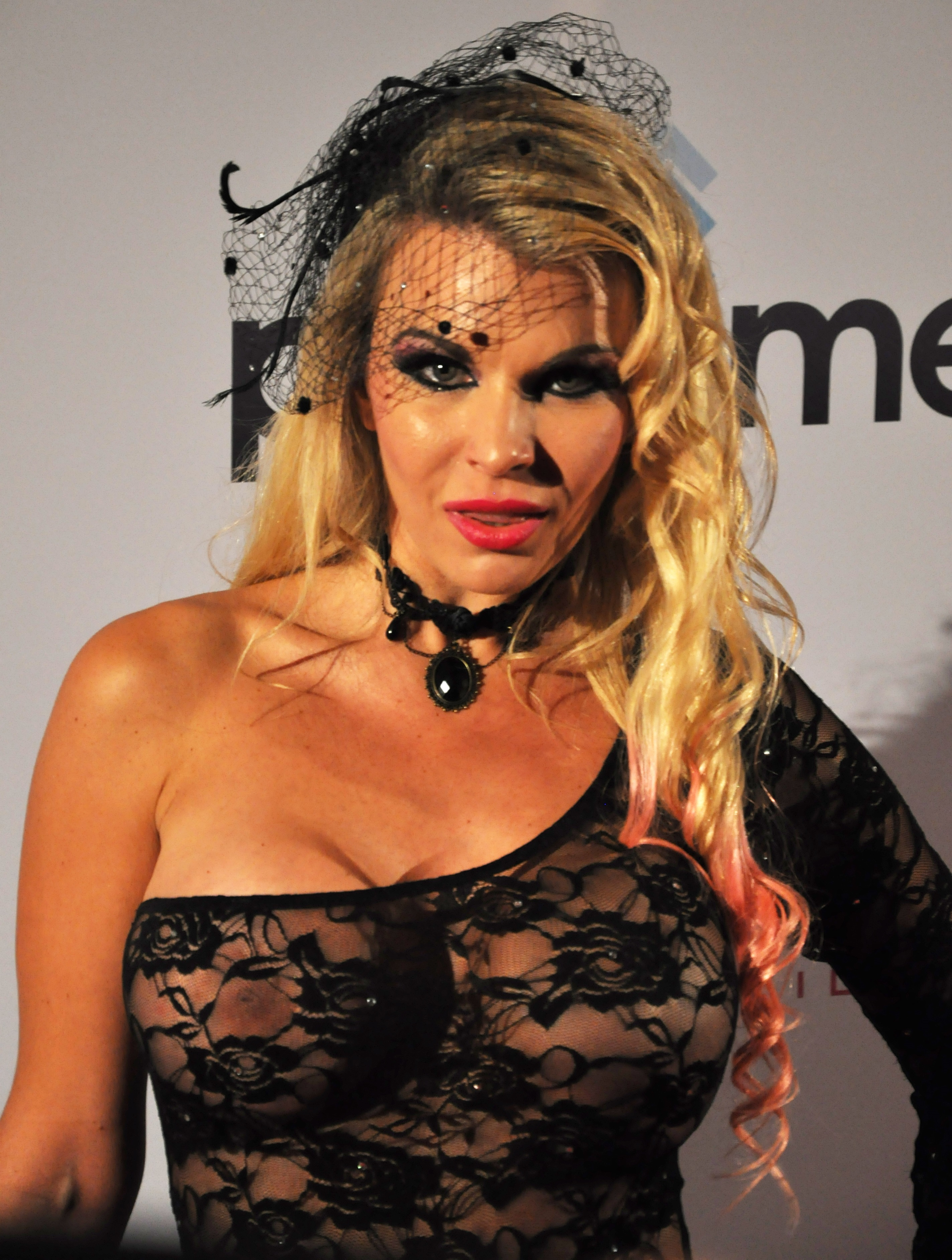
- Pervers at the Venus Awards 2014
- Born: 22 April 1986 (age 40); Kleve, West Germany
- Occupations: Pornographic actress; presenter; singer; actress

Aische Pervers (born 22 April 1986) is a German pornographic actress, presenter, singer and actress.

== Biography ==
Born on 22 April 1986 in Kleve, West Germany, Pervers began her production of self-made porn films during her studies in the German language and theology in 2006. Compared to the Berliner Kurier, she justified this step with financial reasons. After finishing her studies, she concentrated on her video productions. In the following year, Pervers began to regularly use current events for her video productions. She was the first amateur actress to shoot a porn at the Munich Oktoberfest.

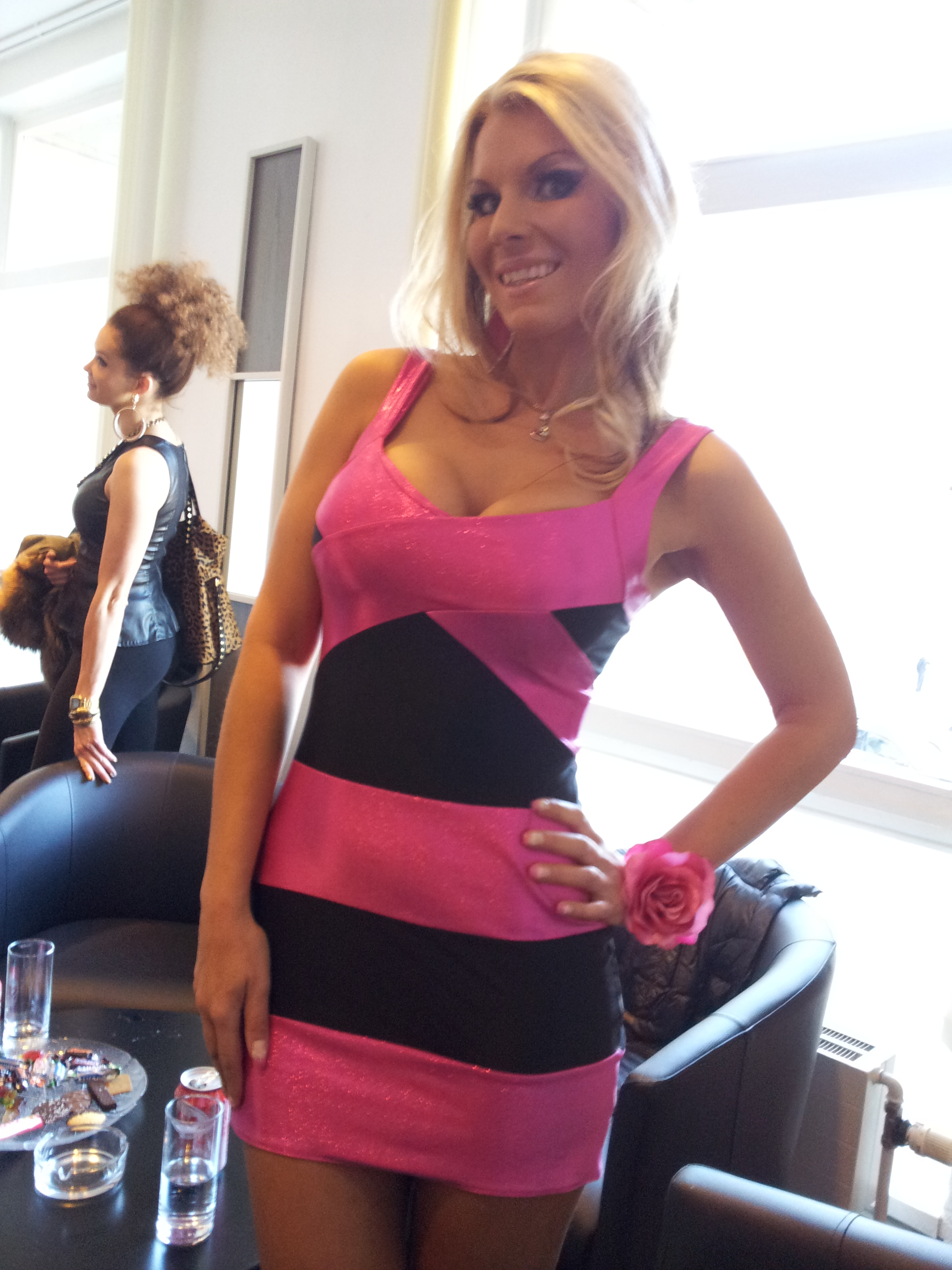
Pervers in 2012

She has been featured in some reports since 2010, had moderation jobs in the erotic programmes of Bluyoo.tv and Sport1, and roles in soap operas. In 2011, she got a leading role in the RTL II series X-Diaries. She appeared as a contestant in Das Supertalent on RTL, with more than seven million television viewers. Dressed as a teacher, she groaned the Erlkönig of Johann Wolfgang von Goethe and stripped to it. The tabloid newspaper Bild recorded this and referred to the performance as "porn poetry".

In 2012, she stood again for the fourth season of X-Diaries before the camera. As of January 2012, she has already filmed more than 400 porn films. In February 2012, she shot with the Berlin Film Festival as a setting of the porn film Anale Berlinale. In May 2012, she was again with the self-written song Disco Porno at the casting for Das Supertalent, even if the performance despite the recording was not aired. So the song had its premiere as a music video at Bild Online on 14 December 2012.

In May 2013, Pervers participated in an episode of Frauentausch. In 2013, she was part of Das Supertalent for the third time. At the end of 2013, she began working as a DJ and singer under the name Miss Aische.

She lived with her husband, the porn-starring Manuel Stallion, in Berlin. In 2014, the couple married in Las Vegas and were accompanied by Exklusiv – Die Reportage for RTL II. In February 2017, the couple announced their separation.

At the beginning of 2016, Pervers took part in the casting of Deutschland sucht den Superstar, where she presented her new song Café Latte. She was accompanied by Micaela Schäfer. She also presented the song in the finale of DSDS on 7 May 2016, and the finale of Germany's Next Topmodel, which took place on 12 May 2016, in the Plaça de toros de Palma, the bullring arena of Palma, used Pervers for another porno show.

== Awards ==
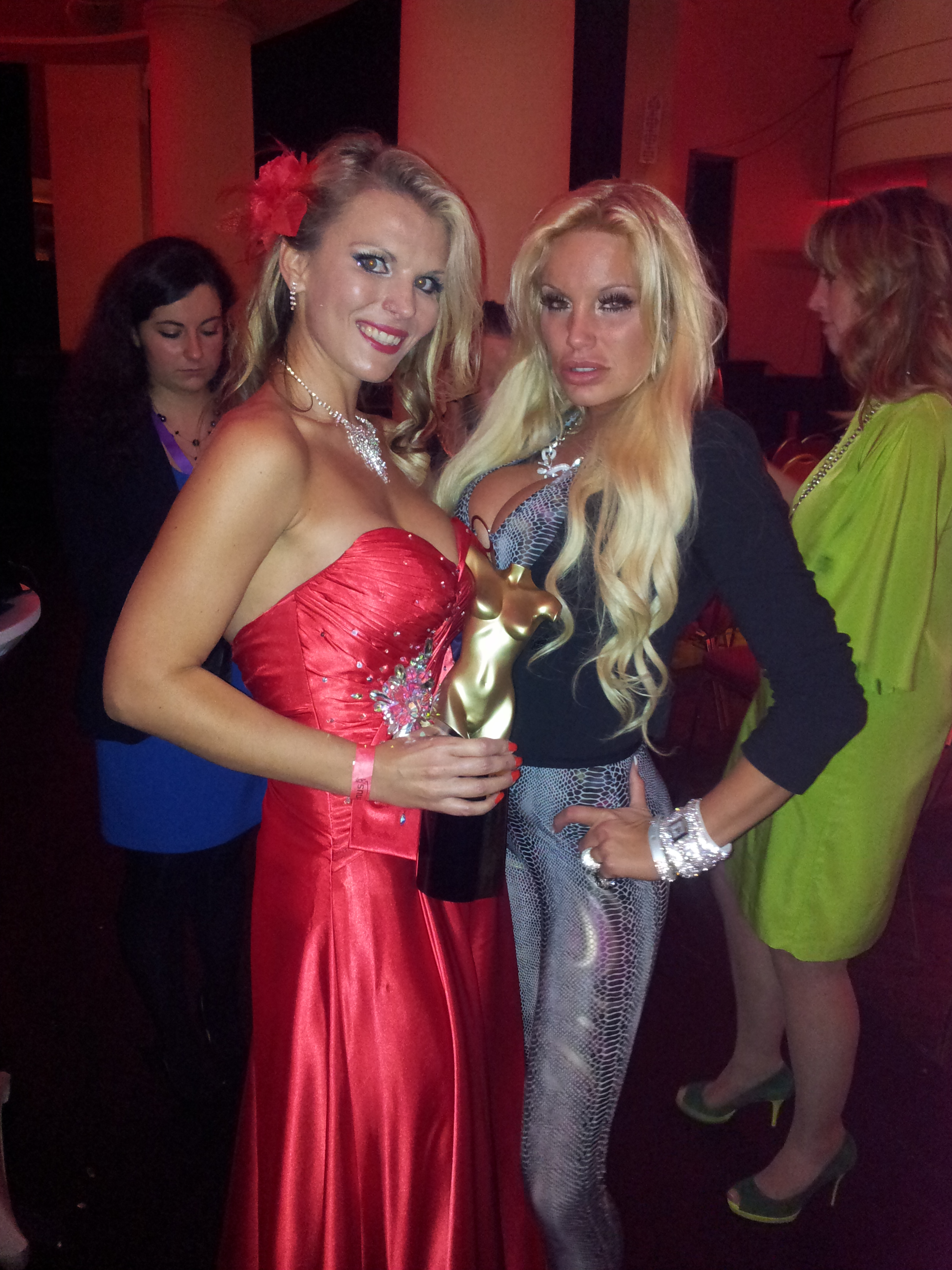
Pervers (left) with her Venus Award from 2012 as Best Amateur Girl, next to Gina-Lisa Lohfink

Year	Ceremony	Award	Result	Ref.
2011	Venus Award	Most Innovative Amateur Projects	Won	
2012	Venus Award	Best Amateur Girl	Won	
2013	Venus Award	Best Amateur Girl	Won	

== Television (selection) ==
Years	Title	Network	Notes	Ref.
2010	Punkt 12	RTL	Der Trödelmillionär	
2010	Bluyoo TV		Presenter	
2011–12	X-Diaries	RTL II	3rd to 4th season	
2011	Das Supertalent	RTL	Aische Pervers stöhnt Goethes Erlkönig	
2011	Investigativ	RTL II	Kuhnigk und das Geschäft mit der Lust	
2012	Verdachtsfälle	RTL		
2012	Hüllenlos in Berlin	Sport1		
2012	Der große deutsche Love-Test	RTL II		
2012	Betrugsfälle	RTL		
2012	Exklusiv – Die Reportage – Deutschlands heißeste Hausfrauen	RTL II		
2013	Frauentausch	RTL II		
2013	Privatdetektive im Einsatz	RTL II		
2013	K11 – Kommissare im Einsatz	Sat.1		
2013	Schicksale – und plötzlich ist alles anders	Sat.1		
2013	Clash! Boom! Bang!	ProSieben		
2014	Exklusiv – Die Reportage – Sexmesse Las Vegas	RTL II	Aische und Manuel im Pornohimmel	
2014	Polizeiruf 110	ARD	1 Episode	
2015	Der Blaulicht Report	RTL		
2015	Homeland	Showtime	1 Episode	
2015	Berlin Tag und Nacht	RTL II	As Lissy Love	
2016	Deutschland sucht den Superstar			
2016	Hilf mir! Jung, pleite, verzweifelt ...	RTL II	As Chira Becker	

== Discography ==
Year	Title	Notes
2012	"Disco Porno"	
2013	"Geil Horny Horny"	As Aische und die geilen Jungs
2014	"Wir sind für Deutschschalalalaland"	Football anthem
2016	"Caffè Latte"	
