= Videorama =

German production and distribution company for pornographic films

Videorama GmbH
- Founded: 1983
- Defunct: 2016
- Fate: Insolvency
- Headquarters: Essen, Germany

Videorama GmbH was a German production and distribution company for pornographic films based in Essen. Along with Magmafilm, it is one of the best-known and largest German providers of hardcore pornography. Well-known Videorama actors were and are: Gina Wild, Vivian Schmitt, Conny Dachs, Kyra Shade, and Leonie Saint.

== History ==
The Videorama GmbH, along with the "Videorama" brand name, was acquired by the Silwa Filmvertrieb AG group in 1983. The goal was to further strengthen film distribution, particularly in the sex and erotic genres. The films are offered on DVD, CD-ROM, and VHS. Videorama is one of the leading providers in Europe. Director Harry S. Morgan, winner of multiple Venus Awards, released several film series under Videorama. Morgan's Happy Video Privat series is the longest-running pornographic film series in Germany and Europe. A film was released every two to three months from 1984 to 2011.

In 2011, The Beate Uhse made a takeover offer for Videorama worth €50 million plus a stake, but the company rejected the offer. In 2016, the company filed for insolvency.

== Fake lawyer emails ==
In 2010, Videorama was involved in a phishing campaign. Fake emails claimed to be from lawyers representing Videorama in copyright and piracy cases. Recipients were asked to pay the alleged lawyers via Ukash or Paysafecard, usually in the amount of €100, to settle the "criminal complaint" for allegedly uploading or downloading music. However, Videorama did not file any lawsuits or criminal charges for music piracy, and the use of the company name is part of the scam.

== Awards ==
- 2006: Eroticline Award „Bester Außendienst“
