= Pornography in Hungary =

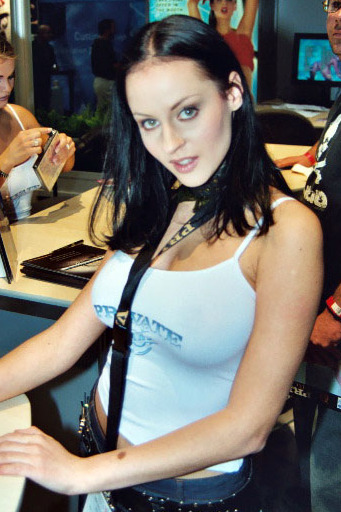
Katalin Vad, known under the screen name of "Michelle Wild", was one of the leading pornographic actresses in Hungary between 2001 and 2004.

The history of pornography in Hungary mainly dates from the period after the fall of communism in 1989. The production and distribution of pornography was illegal under their Socialist system, but the laws were liberalised with the fall of the Hungarian People's Republic. Permissive government policies soon propelled the country to the forefront of the European pornography industry. Several foreign directors were attracted to the country's liberal legislation. Eventually, domestic producers began to prosper as well, and several actresses became prominent within the industry such as Angelica Bella, Michelle Wild and Cicciolina (Ilona Staller). It is illegal to display or promote pornography along with homosexuality and gender change to minors under 18 by July 2021.

== History ==
During the communist era, pornography was considered a product of Western decadence, and was illegal. The laws were liberalised with the fall of the Hungarian People's Republic.

In 2021 Hungary's parliament passed a law that bans display or promote pornography, including gender change or homosexuality to anyone under 18 years old.

== Characteristics ==
Pornography produced in Hungary is distinct from the more widespread U.S. pornography in several ways. A number of young women tried to seek their fortune in the capital. As the highly successful performer Mya Diamond says: "I come from a small village. I wanted to flee poverty and help my brothers and my mother financially." This results in women appearing much more natural than their U.S. counterparts, with the absence of most forms of body modification, like surgical enhancement, tattoos or piercings.

Hungarian adult film stars also include former beauty queens like Anita Dark who was crowned Miss Budapest in 1994 and Rita Faltoyano whose mother was Miss Hungary in 1974.

Former Hungarian model and singer Ilona Staller became an international porn legend during the mid-'80s and '90s going by the stage name Cicciolina, achieving an iconic career on the global hardcore pornography scene.

== Producers and performers ==
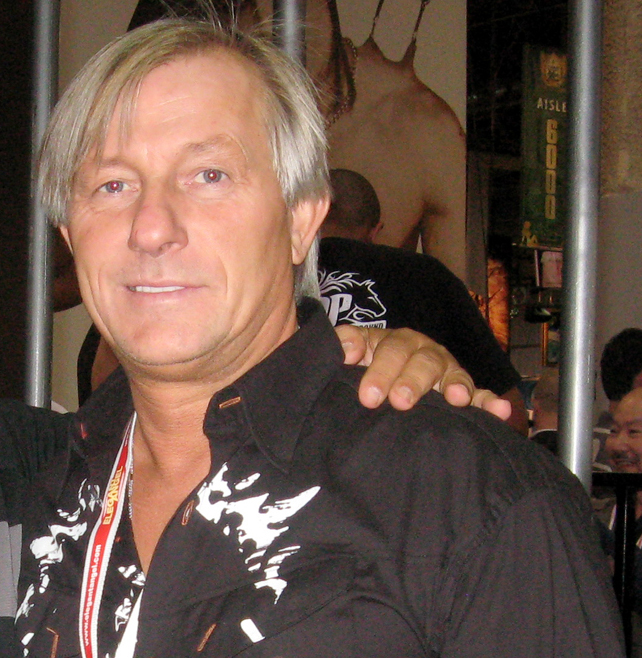
Christoph Clark was a pioneer in the development of Hungarian pornography.

The pioneers within the Hungarian pornography industry were foreign producers who were attracted to the country because of the favourable economic conditions and the steady supply of attractive female performers. The French actor and director Christoph Clark claims to have been the first, when he moved to Budapest as early as 1991.

Initially, female performers were relatively anonymous; they were identified only by first name and normally used only for a few movies. The production companies wanted to avoid name recognition, in order to keep wages at a low level. Gradually, however, certain performers started to emerge as stars with a following among viewers. Because of the international distribution of films shot in Hungary, most performers choose internationally sounding screen names, such as Nikki Anderson, Monique Covét, Michelle Wild. Michelle Wild, whose real name is Katalin Vad, managed to cross over into mainstream stardom, and became an actress on the television soap opera Jóban rosszban.

== See also ==
- Pornography in Europe
- Prostitution in Hungary

== Sources ==
- Sigel, Lisa Z. (2005). "The Hungarian Example". International Exposure: Perspectives on Modern European Pornography, 1800-2000. Rutgers University Press. pp. 178–204. ISBN 0-8135-3519-0.
