= Happy Weekend (magazine) =

German erotic magazine

- Publisher: Silwa Verlag
- Founded: 1972
- Country: Germany
- Website: happyweekend-club

Happy Weekend (abbreviated HW) is a German erotic contact magazine that has been published as a print magazine since 1972 and has also been available as an online magazine since 2006.

== History ==
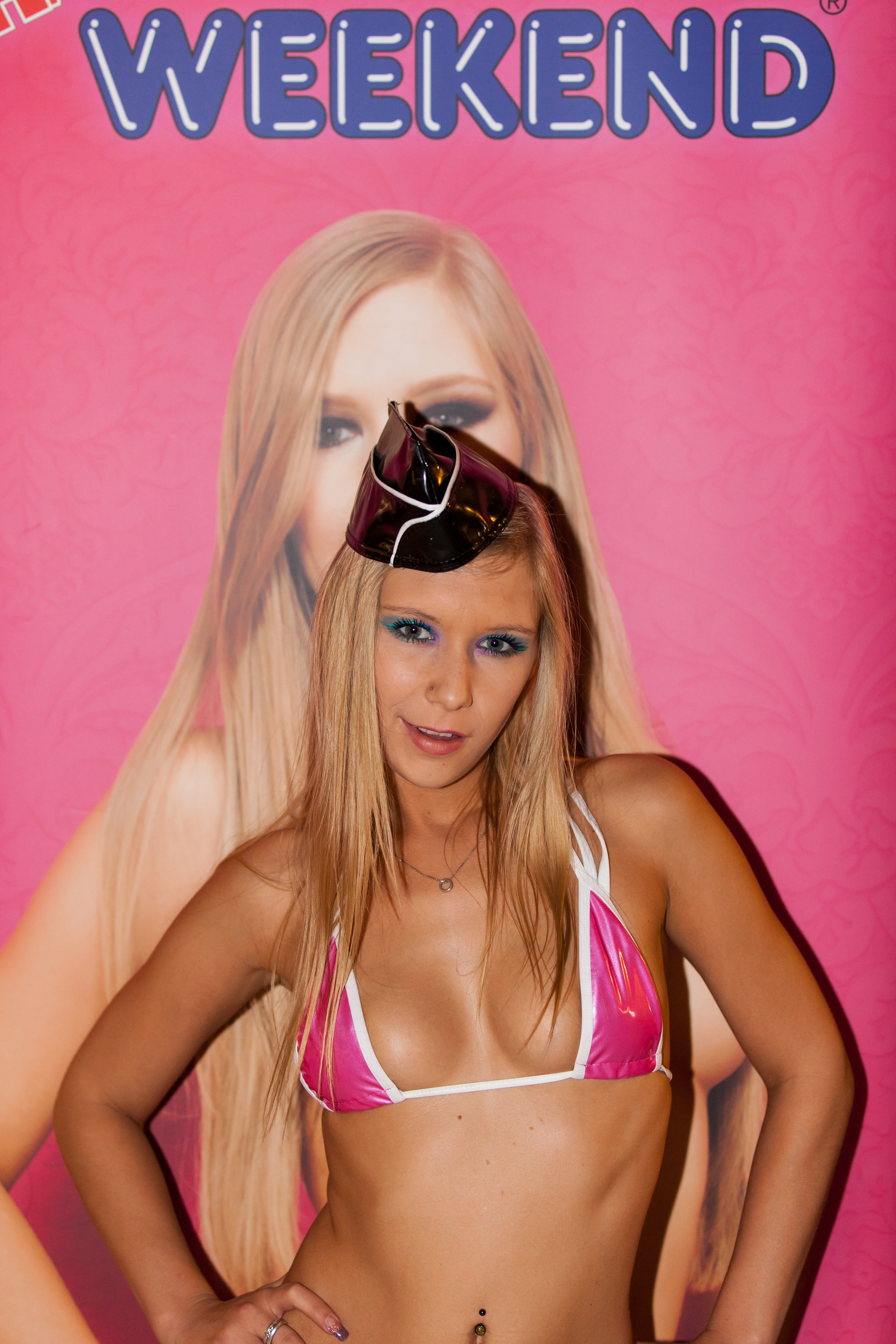
The Lena Nitro in front of a poster of Happy Weekend at the erotic fair Venus 2012 in Berlin

The magazine was founded in 1972 by bookseller Horst F. Peter and his wife. Peter had previously imported the German-language magazine Weekend Sex from Scandinavia. He copied Weekend Sex with the Weekend Sex editor-in-chief and called his magazine Happy Weekend. Since the sale of pornography was still illegal in Germany in 1972, the magazines were shipped from the Netherlands. The official headquarters of the publisher, Silwa-Film B.V., was therefore in the Netherlands for a long time. After a legal reform in 1973, the company was now able to ship the magazines from Essen. They were sold to adults at train station bookstores, gas stations, and sex shops, and previously also at video stores. It was primarily a magazine with private and commercial advertisements for sexual contacts. The advertisements were supplemented by pornographic photos, letters to the editor, intimate interviews, fictional erotic stories, reports from events such as Venus Berlin and Torture Ship, and news from the amateur and professional scenes. The intimate interviews with female amateurs and couples, mostly swingers and prostitutes, were supplemented with explicit pictures. Swinger clubs and brothels were also featured in reports and advertised in the magazine. Over the years, there have been various columns by people from the erotic world.

The Happy Weekend was published bi-weekly until its bankruptcy in 2016, and monthly since 2017. In later years, the magazine included a DVD called "Lustpool." This DVD usually contained reports, porn film trailers from Videorama, and visits to swinger clubs. Happy Weekend also operated a website.

The magazine began in 1972 with an initial circulation of 10,000 copies. Circulation temporarily reached 90,000 copies in 1997. Later, it reached 80,000 copies. Happy Weekend is considered the oldest and best-known dating magazine in Germany. According to the publisher, the Silwa Group, it was the most widely read European dating magazine. Happy Weekend was surpassed by the Austrian Dating Magazine (ÖKM) as the most widely read sex dating magazine. The ÖKM circulation, including various national editions, is around 400,000 copies across Europe.

In addition to Happy Weekend, Silwa produced porn films. Before its insolvency in 2016, Silwa comprised six companies: Videorama GmbH, Elfra Filmproduktion- und Verlagsgesellschaft, Profima, SVK-Video-Kopierwerk, Silwa Filmvertrieb GmbH, and E. A. T. Medien. At their peak, the companies had 270 employees. At the time of the insolvency, only 16 remained.

With the insolvency of Silwa, the publication of Happy Weekend was discontinued in September 2016. The internet is seen as the reason for the decline of Silwa and Happy Weekend. Happy Weekend has been published again since April 2017. In April 2017, the magazine had a circulation of 8,000 copies at its relaunch.

== Happy Video Privat ==
From 1986 onwards, The Silwa company Videorama produced the film series Happy Video Privat. Harry S. Morgan served as director and producer. Morgan's Happy Video Privat series was the longest-running porn film series in Germany and Europe. The series ran from 1986 to 2011 with 116 episodes under Morgan's direction, and he became well known in the porn industry through this video series. In the series, he interviewed couples before filming them having sex. The interviews mainly revolved around the topic of sex. Morgan himself was always present in the interviews. A new episode of Happy Video Privat was released approximately every two months. Each video, and later a DVD, featured five to seven couples. Initially, couples who advertised in Happy Weekend had to be contacted by Morgan to find private individuals willing to act in front of the camera. Later, around 15 couples per month contacted them of their own accord. Happy Weekend advertised Happy Video Privat and vice versa. For this and other Videorama series, Morgan received his first Venus Award in Berlin in 1997 for Best Series Director. Michaela Schaffrath, aka "Gina Wild," was a swinger and first met Morgan through Happy Weekend, when she was featured on a cover. Isabel Golden came into contact with Harry S. Morgan through the publication of her autobiography, "The Erotic Diary of a Thirty-Year-Old," in Happy Weekend. She initially appeared in several episodes of Happy Video Privat before becoming a professional actress. Golden filmed Happy Weekend Special Edition - Excesses in Paris with Morgan, based on her diary. Four more films in the Happy Weekend - Special Edition series with Golden later followed. The films bore the Happy Weekend logo on the cover. As with Gina Wild and Isabel Golden, other Videorama porn stars such as Kyra Shade, Lena Nitro, Leonie Saint, Texas Patti, and Vivian Schmitt were frequently featured in Happy Weekend.
