= Gina-Lisa Lohfink =

German media personality

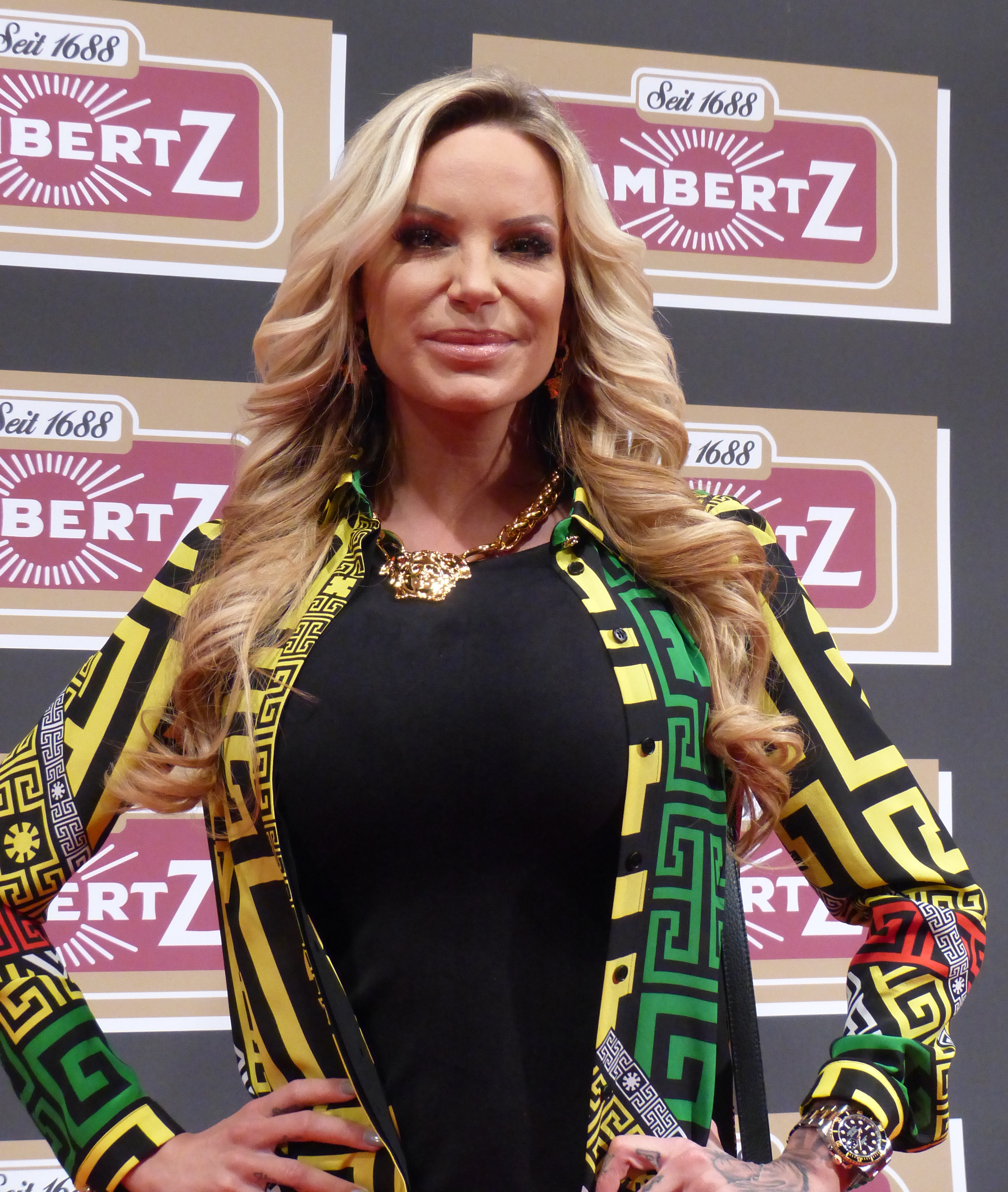
- Lohfink in 2016
- Born: 23 September 1986 (age 39); Seligenstadt, West Germany
- Occupations: TV and media personality; model; actress; singer
- Years active: 2005–present

Gina-Lisa Lohfink (born 23 September 1986) is a German television and media personality.

== Early life ==
Lohfink was born on 23 September 1986 in Seligenstadt, Hesse. After finishing school, she trained as a nurse and worked as a fitness trainer. She has heterochromia; her right eye is green and her left eye is blue.

In 2015, Lohfink revealed she suffers from congenital heart defect.

== Career ==
=== Pageantry ===
Lohfink won Miss Frankfurt 2005, Miss Darmstadt 2006 and Queen of the World/Internet 2007. She was Miss Supermodel at Miss Hawaiian Tropic International 2007.

=== Modelling ===
In 2006, Lohfink modelled for clothing label Southpole. In 2008, she participated on the third cycle of Germany's Next Topmodel, being selected as one of the nineteen finalists. Despite being a fan favorite, she finished in twelfth place. She has shot for numerous men's magazines such as Playboy, Penthouse and FHM. Later in 2008, she starred in an ad campaign for Sixt alongside centenarian actor Johannes Heesters. In February 2010, she walked in New York Fashion Week for Heatherette designer Richie Rich for his collection A*MUSE. In 2012, she starred in a campaign for Redcoon with fellow Germany's Next Topmodel contestant and model Micaela Schäfer.

=== Television and acting ===
Lohfink has appeared in television shows such as taff, Gülcan und Collien ziehen aufs Land, Maischberger, Mieten, kaufen, wohnen, Das perfekte Promi-Dinner (German spin-off to Come Dine with Me), Die Alm, Bauer sucht Frau, and Big Brother Germany as well as her own web series Gina-Lisa's Welt and Gina-Lisa's Best Buddy.

She made her acting debut in 2008 in the television comedy show Putzfrau Undercover. Since then she has appeared in the comedy show Marienhof and The Vampire Club, a short film by Marc Terenzi. She starred in the 2011 production of Grease in Frankfurt, and also appeared in the music video for Loona's single "El Tiburón".

=== Other work ===
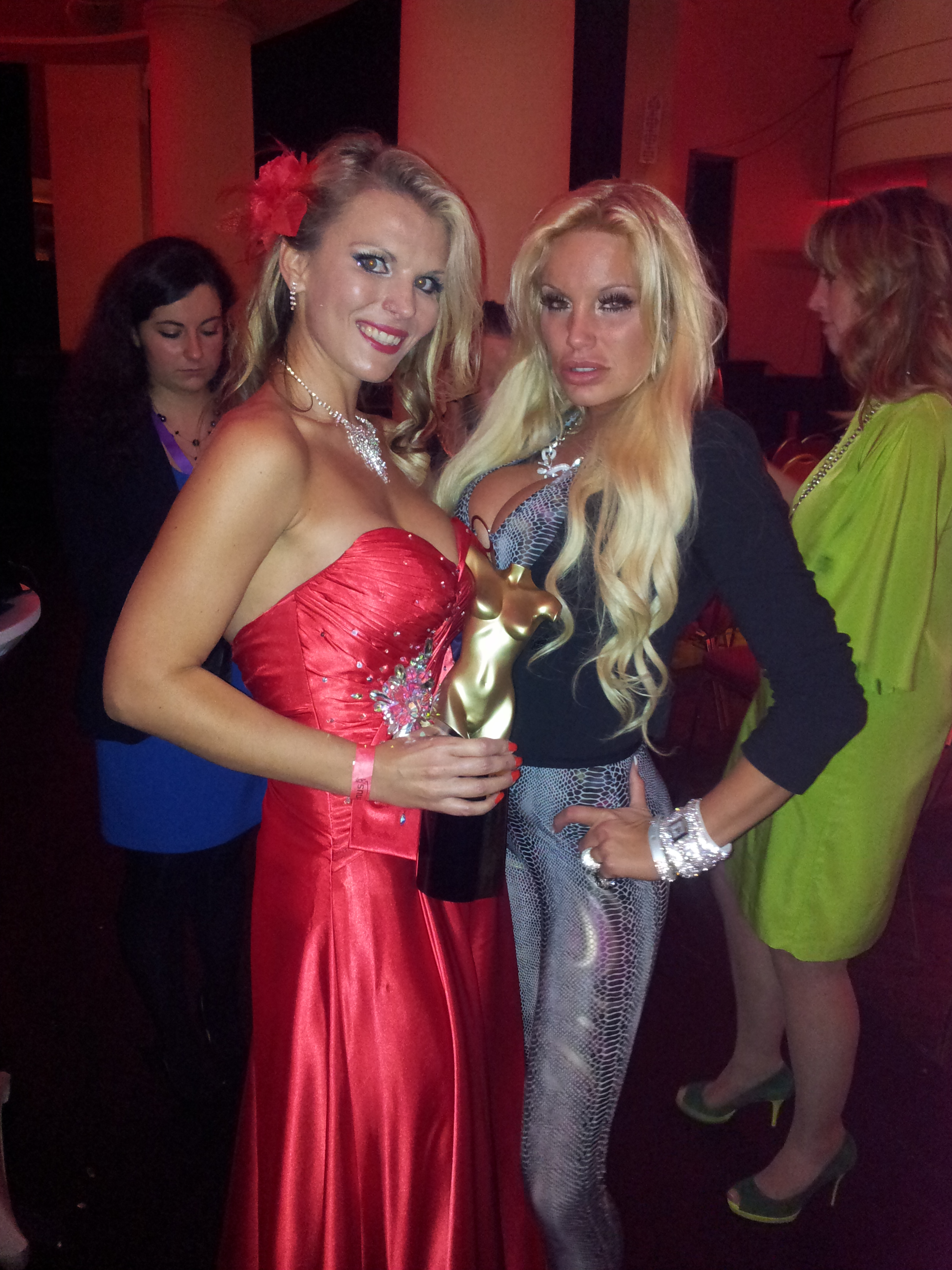
Lohfink (right) at the Venus Awards with pornographic actress Aische Pervers, October 2012

In 2009, Lohfink founded Ginalisa Eyewear, a brand of sunglasses.

In 2010, she released her debut single, "Alles Klar".

In 2012, she was the face of Venus, an erotic fair, promoting safer sex.

== Legal issues ==
In January 2016, Lohfink was ordered to pay a €24,000 fine, when the Amtsgericht Tiergarten court in Berlin ruled that she had falsely accused two men of raping her, after a video of a sexual encounter with them surfaced on the Internet. Lohfink appealed the decision, unsuccessfully.
