= John Thompson Productions =

German pornographic film studio

- Company type: Private
- Industry: Pornography
- Founded: 1997; 29 years ago
- Founder: John Thompson
- Headquarters: Berlin, Germany
- Area served: Worldwide
- Products: Pornographic films
- Owner: Kerstin Gotzmann; Raymond Bacharach
- Website: www.privatebukkake.com

John Thompson Productions is a German pornographic film studio based in Berlin, Germany. The studio is best known for its bukkake-themed series German Goo Girls (GGG), but it has other series focusing on gang bangs, urolagnia and urophagia, BDSM, erotic humiliation and rough sex. The company is one of the best known and top selling German and European porn studios. John Thompson and his films have won or been nominated for several pornography awards, but the perceived extreme nature of its content has led to some of its films being banned in several countries.

== John Thompson ==
John Thompson (real name Raymond Louis Bacharach; born 11 May 1945) is the producer and director of all John Thompson Productions. He studied psychology and art in West Berlin. Prior to founding his company, he worked as a director and cameraman with the German porn label Puaka. He founded John Thompson Productions in 1997 and so far has produced more than a thousand films, typically releasing six new DVDs every month.

== Series ==
John Thompson Productions logos

=== German Goo Girls ===
The GGG series started in 1997. It focuses on bukkake and snowballing, but it also features gang bangs, lesbian sex and very occasionally urolagnia, being the most successful of all John Thompson Productions. GGG is distributed in the United States by Black Widow Productions, who had to move to some sort of larger warehouse to cope with demand for the series. GGG won in the Special Video production category at the 2004 Venus Awards. GGG title Cissie's Cum Show was nominated in the Best Specialty Release – Other Genre category at the 2006 AVN Awards. The series also won the Adam Film World Most Outrageous Sex Series award in 2005 and is discussed in the 2008 book Alles über Porno! by Marcel Feige. Importing the GGG title Vollgespritzt & Vollgepisst to Canada is prohibited due to it being deemed obscene by the Canadian authorities. GGG launched the career of Annette Schwarz, so far the only actress to have worked with John Thompson to have gone on to some sort of successful mainstream porn career in the United States.

=== 666 ===
Started in 2001, 666 focuses mainly on urolagnia and urophagia, though it also features bukkake. The series is banned in Switzerland. Importing the 666 titles Vollgepisst !!! and Wasser Marsch! to Canada is again prohibited and Piss Bude is banned in Australia. All 666 films and any other John Thompson films featuring urolagnia are presumably banned in New Zealand, where publishing anything promoting or supporting urolagnia is an offense punishable by up to ten years in prison and possessing films depicting urolagnia is punishable by up to 5 years in prison.

=== Sexbox ===
Started in 2004, Sexbox mainly focuses on BDSM, erotic humiliation and rough sex, with some bukkake and urolagnia. The series is banned in Switzerland and Sexbox 15 was also seized by the German authorities.

=== Mädchenmund ===
Started in 2007, Mädchenmund (Girl's Mouth) focuses on young-looking women over 18 years old. It also features extensive dialogue, unusual for some of the other films produced by John Thompston Productions. The series plots typically feature some sort of naive young girl at a doctor's or theatrical agent's office, who is seemingly persuaded into sex against her own judgement. The series won the Best New Video Series award at the 2006 Eroticline awards.

=== GGG John Thompsons Casting Girls ===
Casting Girls is a behind the scenes look at John Thompson Productions screening process for prospective new GGG actresses.
