= Katalin Vad =

Hungarian actress (born 1980)

Michelle Wild
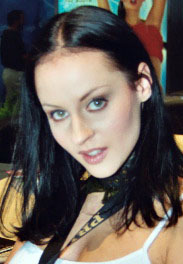
- Wild in 2003
- Born: Katalin Vad; 16 January 1980 (age 46); Sátoraljaújhely, Borsod–Abaúj–Zemplén, Hungary
- Other names: Katia; Michelle Wilde
- Occupations: Actress; former porn actress
- Years active: 2001–2014

Katalin Vad (born 16 January 1980), known by her stage name Michelle Wild (vad literally meaning "wild" in Hungarian), is a Hungarian actress and former pornographic actress who worked mainly for Private Media Group (international) and LUXx Video (Hungary).

== Career ==
Her first adult film, Sex Opera, was shot in 2001, and she subsequently worked repeatedly with the same company, Private Media Group, and the director Kovi, producing such adult films as Brides & Bitches and The Sex Secrets of the Paparazzi. She has also worked with such prominent porn directors as Rocco Siffredi (Animal Trainer 5) and Christoph Clark in "Euro Angels" films saga.

In 2003, Private produced a semi-documentary-style adult film entitled The Private Life of Michelle Wild. The film featured snippets of Wild speaking about her desires, interspersed with scenes from her previous films.

She had a regular column in the men's magazine FHM and co-hosted a late night radio talk show. She met her future husband, a cocktail bartender, when he was a guest on her radio show.

She played "Ivett Janovics", a nurse in a hospital-themed daily soap opera called Jóban Rosszban ("Good Times, Bad Times") on Hungary's TV2.

Since her retirement from the adult business and the birth of her daughter, she has said, in several interviews in Hungary, that she has completely changed and, although she does not deny her past, she would not take the porn actress road again.

In 2009, she appeared in the documentary The Outsiders, which looks at the artists who "challenge the extremes of sexuality in art".

== Awards and nominations ==
- 2003 Venus Award winner – Best Actress (Hungary)
- 2003 Barcelona International Erotic Film Festival Ninfa Award winner – Best Supporting Actress (Hot Rats)
- 2004 European X Award winner – Best Actress (Germany)
- 2004 AVN Award winner – Best Tease Performance (Crack Her Jack 1)

== Partial mainstream filmography ==
- A Bus Came... (2003), as "The Girl" in the segment "No Comment"
- La memoria de los peces (2004), as "Pamela"
- Nomen est Omen avagy Reszkess Szabó János! (2004)
- Rom-Mánia (2004)
- Dobogó kövek (2010)
