= Pornography in Germany =

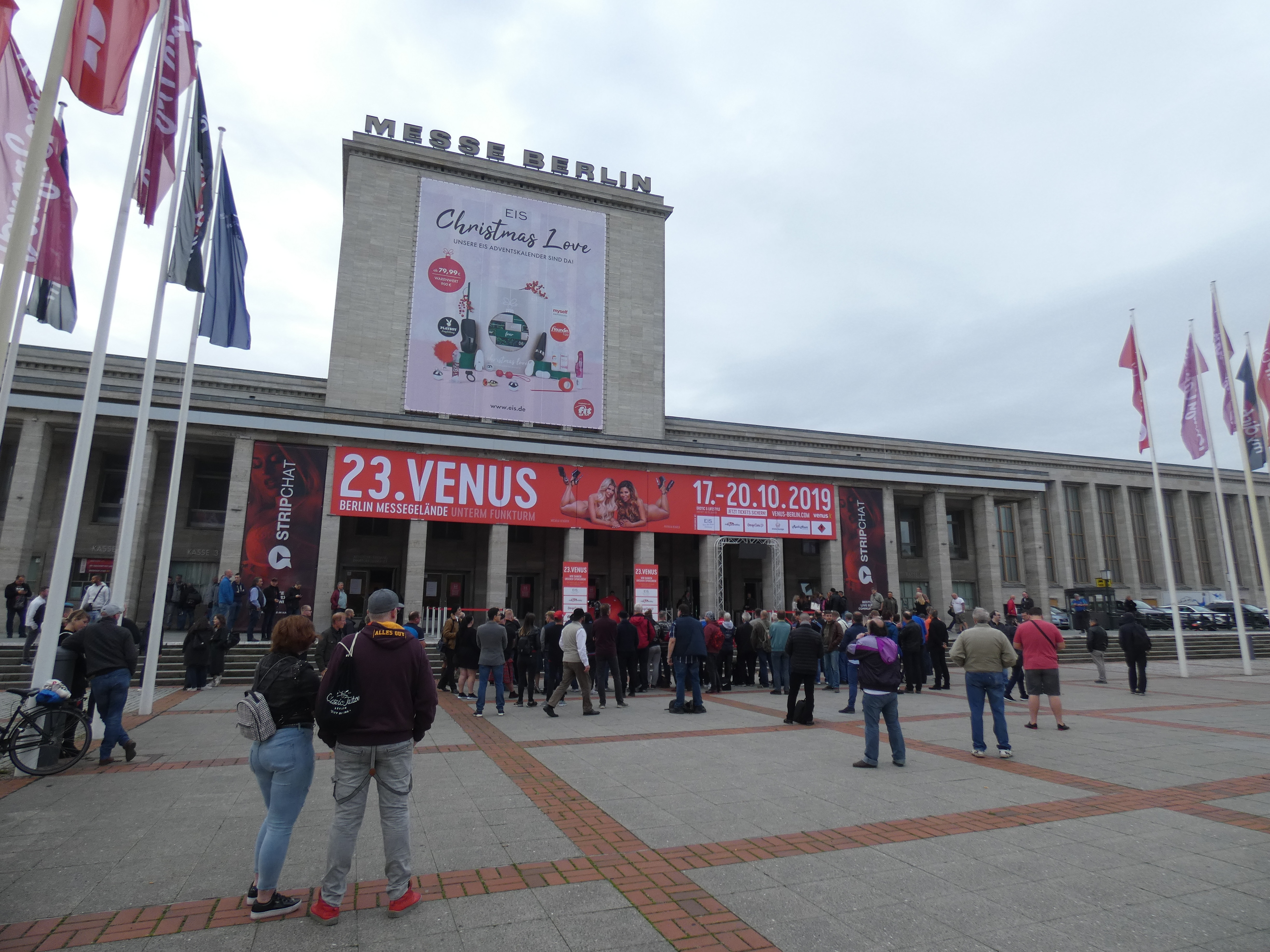
Entrance to Venus Berlin in 2019, the world's largest adult entertainment and pornography convention

Germany was the world's second-largest consumer market for pornography behind the United States in 2007. In 2013, according to Similarweb, 12.5% of all website visits in Germany were to pornographic sites, the highest rate in the world.

== Regulation ==
Pornography has been legal in Germany since 1975. Exceptions to this include pornographic content depicting violent acts or sexual acts with animals, the distribution of which is prohibited, as well as child pornographic content, the distribution and possession of which is prohibited when depicting real children, but legal when it is immediately apparent that the content is purely of fictional nature in cases of mere possession. German law distinguishes between child and youth pornographic content, whereby the latter, which concerns persons over the age of 14, is punished less severely, with the mere possession of youth pornographic content being legal when it is produced exclusively for personal use with the consent of the persons depicted.

Germany has relatively liberal laws and cultural attitudes concerning softcore pornography, which may even be broadcast on TV at night.

Selling or distributing pornography to minors is a criminal offense. Shops and websites that offer pornography must carry out age verification. For example, Aylo's age-verification software AgeID is used to verify the ages of users of pornographic Internet websites and has been in use in Germany since 2015. Violators of the law can face fines up to 500,000€.

The German Edathy affair of 2013/14 following the neglected cooperation of Federal Criminal Police within the Canadian child pornography uncoverings gave way for new legislation procedures in parliament to define the status of either posing or exhibitive pictures of minors. New laws were still in parliamentary debating as lately as 19 December 2014.

== History ==
One of the earliest artifacts depicting human sexuality in the history of mankind, the Venus of Hohle Fels, was found in 2008 in the Hohle Fels cave in Schelklingen, in the German state of Baden-Württemberg. It is estimated to be more than 35,000 years old and has been described by some experts and media as (borderline) pornographic.

One of the earliest pornographic films in the world is the German stag film "Am Abend", released in 1910.

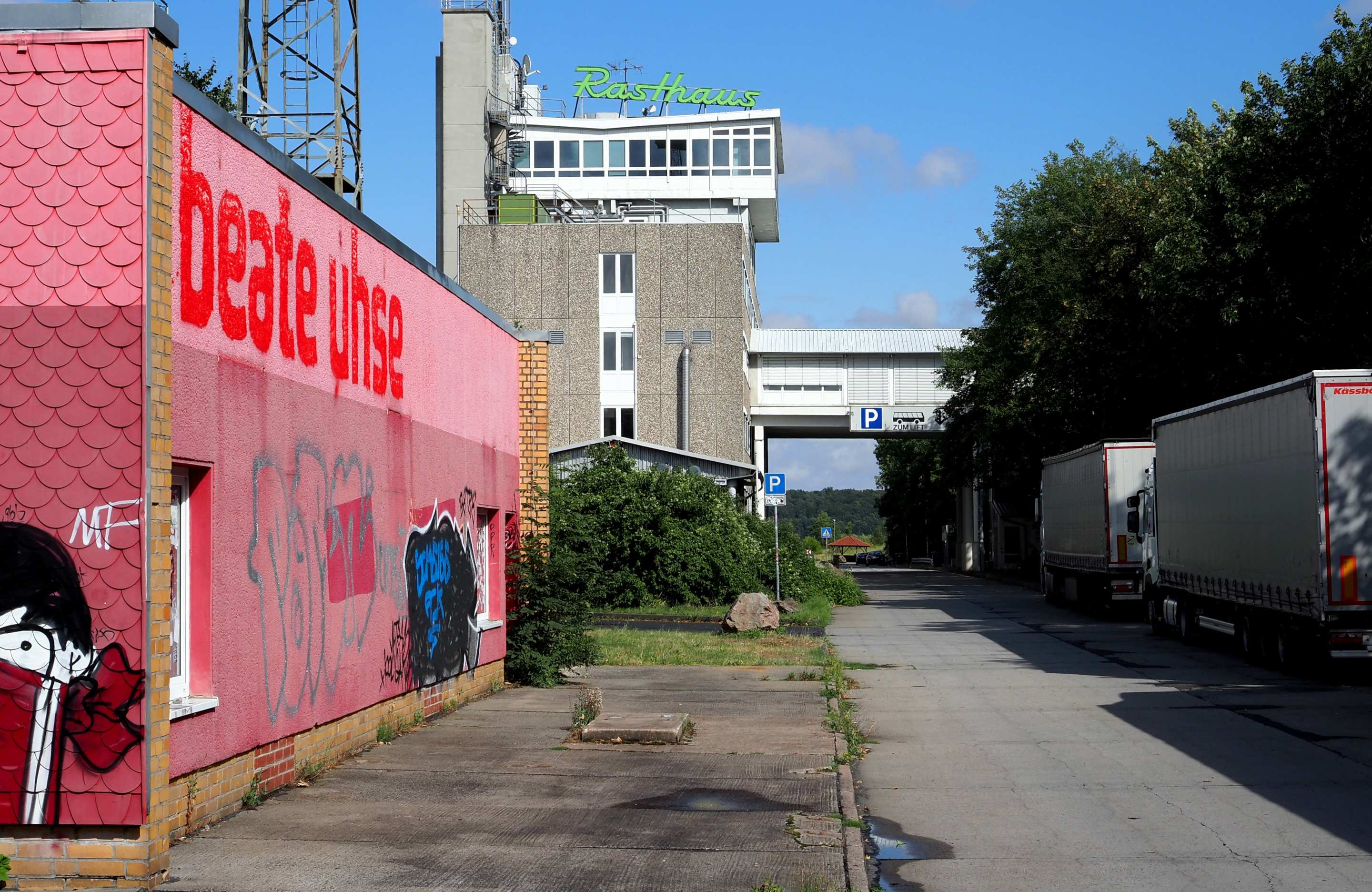
Closed sex shop at a former inner German border crossing point

The world's first sex shop was opened in Flensburg in 1962 by Beate Uhse AG. Post-WW2 commercial movie pornography in Germany began with the softcore film Graf Porno und seine Mädchen (Count Porno and his girls) in 1968. The movie's success (more than 3 million admissions) led to a whole series of pornographic media that was referred to in German media as the Sex-Welle (sex wave). The most well known film of this period is Schulmädchen-Report: Was Eltern nicht für möglich halten (The School-Girl Report, what the parents do not believe possible) by Ernst Hofbauer in 1970. The sex scenes had become bolder with time and by 1975, when the legal ban of pornography was lifted, the era of German hardcore pornography began.

In 1976, the German band Scorpions released the album Virgin Killer, whose original cover featured a nude ten-year-old girl, which stirred controversy in several countries and, as a result, was re-issued in some countries with a different cover. The question of whether the album cover meets the definition of child pornography has been controversially discussed.

As of 2007, over 1,000 pornographic films were released on DVD each month in Germany, and annual sales were estimated at around 800 million euros.

In 2018, the SPD Berlin passed a proposal to create government-funded feminist porn and make it freely available via public broadcasters, arguing that "mainstream porn depicts sexist and racist stereotypes", which can have negative effects on consumers and create unrealistic expectations among young people.

In a 2022 episode of the German public TV show ZDF Magazin Royale that focused on ethical problems in the online porn industry, Jan Böhmermann announced that their team, under direction of Paulita Pappel, had created the first public-service fee-funded TV porno film. He described it as an "ethically correct, queer-feminist high-gloss porno” where all performers consented, were treated fairly, and paid properly. The film, titled FFMM straight / queer doggy BJ ORAL orgasm squirting ROYALE (gebührenfinanziert), received an oscar at the 2022 Venus Award ceremony.

== Film and pornography ==
Director Hans Billian was the protagonist of the period and the films were usually in line with the so-called "Bavarian porn sex comedies", often depicting male performers as comic characters, like Sepp Gneißl in Kasimir der Kuckuckskleber (1977). This era was also characterised by several Josephine Mutzenbacher films.
