= Hans Moser =

Hans Moser may refer to:

- Hans Gmoser (1932–2006), Canadian mountaineer, whose name is often misspelled
- Hans Heinz Moser (1936–2017), Swiss actor
- Hans Joachim Moser (1889–1967), German composer and musicologist
- Hans Möser (1906–1948), SS concentration camp officer
- Hans Moser (actor) (1880–1964), Austrian actor
- Hans Moser (director) (1944–2016), German movie director
- Hans Moser (handballer) (born 1937), Romanian-born German handball player
- Hans Moser (politician), president of the Federal Democratic Union of Switzerland
- Hans Moser (rider) (1901–1974), Swiss Olympic rider
- Hans-Werner Moser (born 1965), German football coach and a former player
