= Fun Factory =

Fun Factory may refer to:

== Music ==
- Fun Factory (band), a German Eurodance group
- Fun Factory (single album), by Fromis 9, 2019
- "Fun Factory" (song), by the Damned, 1991
- "Fun Factory", a 2010 live show by the Singing Kettle

== Television ==
- Fun Factory (TV series), a 1985–1994 British children's program
- Fun Factory, a 1980 British children's program co-presented by Jeremy Beadle
- The Fun Factory, an American game show hosted by Bobby Van

== Other uses ==
- Fun Factory (company), a German manufacturer of erotic toys
- Fun Factory Uganda, a Ugandan entertainment company
- "Fun Factory", a popular epithet for the film studios run by Mack Sennett
- Play-Doh Fun Factory, an accessory for Play-Doh
