= Mario Salieri =

Italian pornographic director (born 1957)

- Born: 29 November 1957 (age 68); Naples, Italy
- Occupations: Producer and director
- Years active: 1987–present
- Known for: Adult erotic films

Mario Salieri (born 29 November 1957) is an Italian pornographic film director and producer.

== Career ==
Salieri started his adult film career with semi-amateur films shot in Amsterdam for the Italian market. Since the early 1990s, he has directed and written many adult film titles. He is also the owner of the company Salieri Productions.

== Awards (selected) ==
- 2001 Venus Award winner – Italian National Prize
- 2001 Ninfa Award winner – Best Director (Divina)
- 2003 Venus Award winner – Best Director (Italy)
- 2007 Ninfa Award winner – Best Director (La Viuda De La Camorra – Negro Y Azul)
- 2008 European X Award – Best Director (Italy)
- 2008 Ninfa Lifetime Career Award (Public) winner

== Filmography (selected) ==
- Inside Napoli (1989)
- Roman Orgies – Italian Perversions (1990)
- Discesa all'inferno (1991)
- Napoli – Parigi, linea rovente 1 (1991)
- Napoli – Parigi, linea rovente 2 (1991)
- Roma Connection (1991)
- Arabika (1992)
- Adolescenza perversa (1993)
- Concetta Licata (1994)
- Dracula (1994)
- Sceneggiata napoletana (1994)
- Eros e Tanatos (1995)
- La Clinica della vergogna (1995)
- Casino (2001)
- Faust (2002)
- La Dolce Vita (2003)
- La Ciociara – Fuga da Roma (2017)

== See also ==
The following listing includes related award-winning directors of adult erotic films:

- Andrew Blake
- Tinto Brass
- Radley Metzger
- Philip Mond
- Michael Ninn
- Bill Osco
