= MyDirtyHobby =

Pornography website

mydirtyhobby
- Available in: English, German, French, Spanish, Italian
- Industry: Pornography
- Website: www.mydirtyhobby.com
- Registration: Yes
- Launched: April 28, 2006; 20 years ago
- Current status: Active

MyDirtyHobby is a website owned by Aylo focused on amateur pornography providing videos, photos and webcam shows.

== Concept ==
MyDirtyHobby allows both users and performers to interact with each other through private messages and instant messaging. The performers on mydirtyhobby.com are mostly amateur models and cam girls. However, there are also some porn stars to be found, such as Vivian Schmitt and Emma Starr.

As of September 2015, over 370,000 videos and 3.8 million pictures uploaded on the website by more than 40,000 amateur performers.

== Awards ==
- 2011 Sign Awards - Bestes Amateurportal
- 2010 Venus Awards - Best Website Amateur National
- 2011 Venus Awards - Best Amateur Website Germany
- 2011 Venus Awards - Best New Amateur DVD Series Europe
- 2019 Venus Awards - Best Amateur Community
