= Die 8. Sünde =

2002 film

- Directed by: Alain Payet; Walter Molitor
- Produced by: Magmafilm
- Starring: Horst Baron; Marlene Cartier; Conny Dachs; Tiffany Hopkins; Jessica Lanoux aka Nicola K.; Anja Juliette Laval; Pierre Laval; Tyra Misoux; Sascha; Philippe Soine; Fanny Steel; Janet Taylor; Susi Webstar
- Release dates: 2002 (France); 2003 (Germany)
- Running time: 112 min.
- Country: Germany
- Language: German

Die 8. Sünde (The 8th Sin) is a German pornographic film, and the winner of the Venus Award for Best Film 2003.

== Plot summary ==
The film follows the protagonist, an angel in heaven (played by Horst Baron and his female entourage, Tiffany Hopkins and Susi Webstar). They are inspired by a secret book about the seven deadly sins. The individual scenes each depict one mortal sin.

=== Scene breakdown ===
The first scene depicts the sin of gluttony. A married couple, played by Philippe Soine and Marlene Cartier, is brought together again after years of abstinence due to a snack attack. The second scene is dedicated to the sin of pride, in which a neglected wife (played by Nicole K.) finds the sexual attention she craves in a meeting with another man. In the following scene, Conny Dachs and Fanny Steel depict the sin of greed. The fourth scene is dominated by Janet Taylor dreaming about her perfect man who resembles the sin of a sloth. The fifth sin, wrath, is depicted in a scene featuring Tyra Misoux. The following scene is dedicated to the sin of envy, starring Anja Juliette and Pierre Laval. In the seventh and last scene, the two female angels mentioned above animate several stone statues in a depiction of the final sin, lust.

== Awards and honors ==
- 2003: Venus Award for "Best Film - Germany"
