= Sexy Cora =

German porn actor (1987–2011)

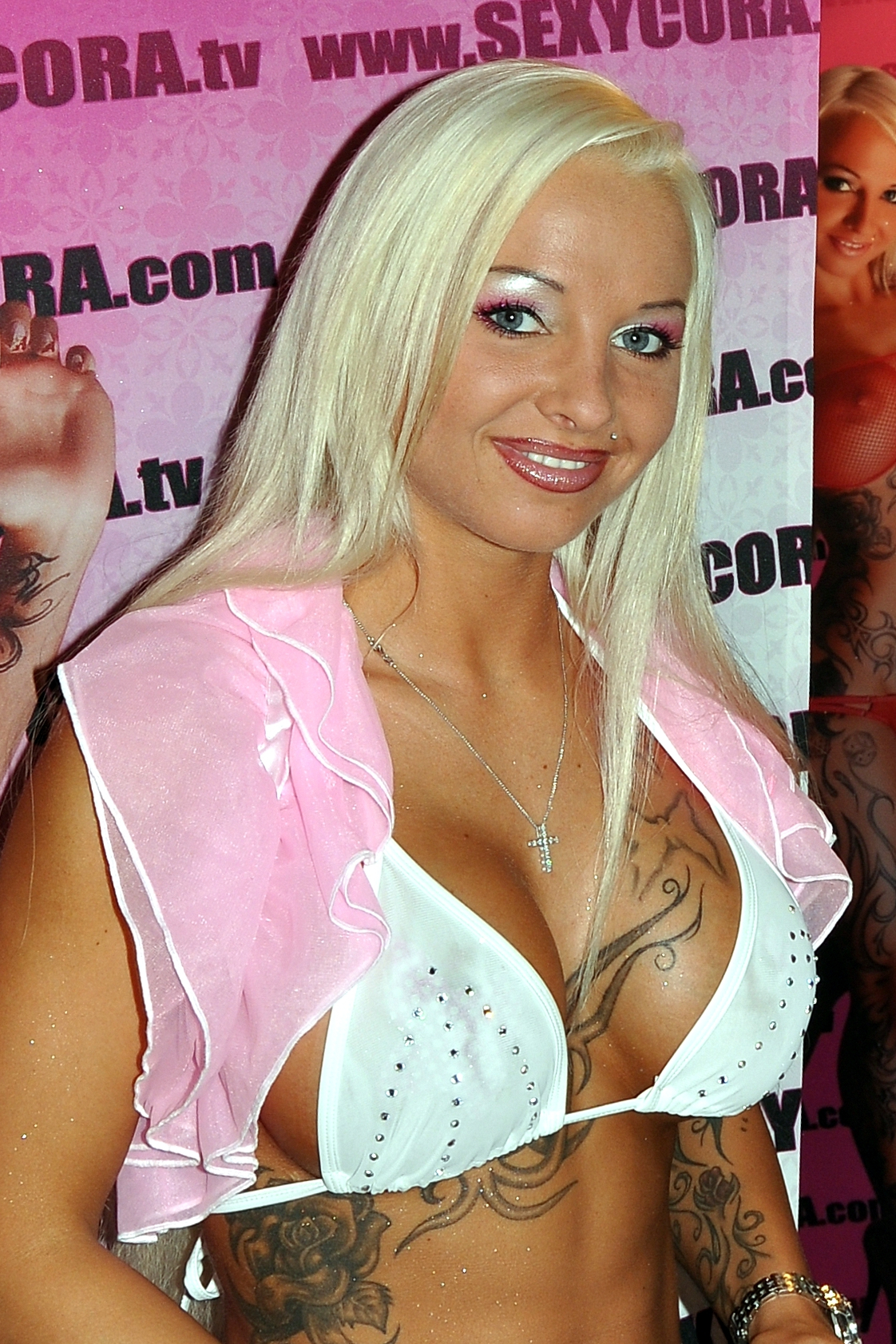
- Ebert in 2010
- Born: Carolin Ebert; 2 May 1987; West Berlin, West Germany
- Died: 20 January 2011 (aged 23); Hamburg, Germany
- Cause of death: Cardiac arrest
- Other name: Carolin Wosnitza
- Occupations: Pornographic film actor; model; singer
- Years active: 2009–2011
- Television: Big Brother season 10
- Spouse: Tim Wosnitza

Sexy Cora (born Carolin Ebert, civil name Carolin Wosnitza; 2 May 1987 – 20 January 2011) was a German pornographic actress, model, singer, exotic dancer, wife of Tim Wosnitza, and reality show participant.

Cora was born in West Berlin. She was one of the participants of the 10th season of Big Brother Germany. Cora released two music singles after her Big Brother participation: "My Love – La, La, La" and "Lass uns kicken (Alles klar wunderbar)".

== Medical issues and death ==
Cora was hospitalised in 2009 after trying to break the world record for the number of fellatios performed in one day. She was trying for 200 men but was unable to pass 75.

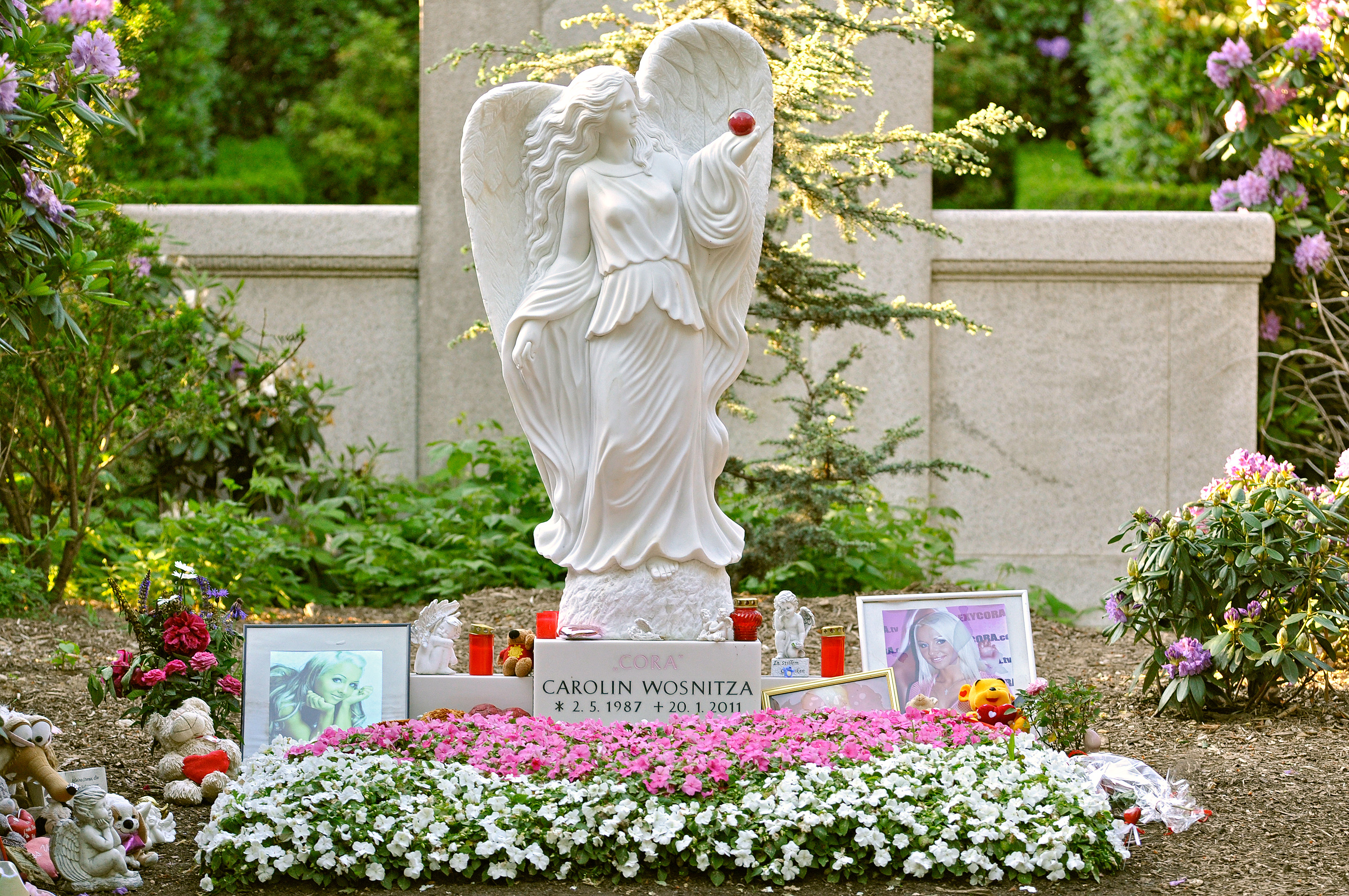
Headstone of Carolin Wosnitza (photographed 30 May 2011)

Cora suffered a heart attack on 11 January 2011, during her breast enlargement surgery at a plastic surgery clinic in Hamburg. It was her sixth such operation. Minutes into the procedure, she went into cardiac arrest, causing her blood pressure to steadily drop and her organs to stop functioning. She sustained heavy brain damage as a result. She was moved to a local hospital and placed in a medically induced coma for a week due to her condition. Her husband, Tim Wosnitza, claimed that he was told by doctors that she would die due to the brain damage, and was at her side for nine days until she died on 20 January 2011.

Police investigated the clinic for possible treatment errors. On 21 January, the two doctors who performed the surgery on Cora were charged with negligent manslaughter. A statement from the clinic said the doctors were "extremely upset and deeply regret the death of patient C.W." and that they are giving "full and complete support" to authorities investigating her death.

On 5 February 2013, Deutsche Presse-Agentur reported that a 56-year-old anesthetist had been convicted of involuntary manslaughter in the death of Cora. The Hamburg hospital doctor was given a 15-month suspended sentence for not ensuring that the actress had enough oxygen during the 2011 cosmetic surgery.

== Awards ==
- 2010: Venus Award: Best Amateur Actress Germany
- 2010: Erotixxx Award: Best Amateur Actress
