= Roberta Gemma =

Italian pornographic actress (born 1980)

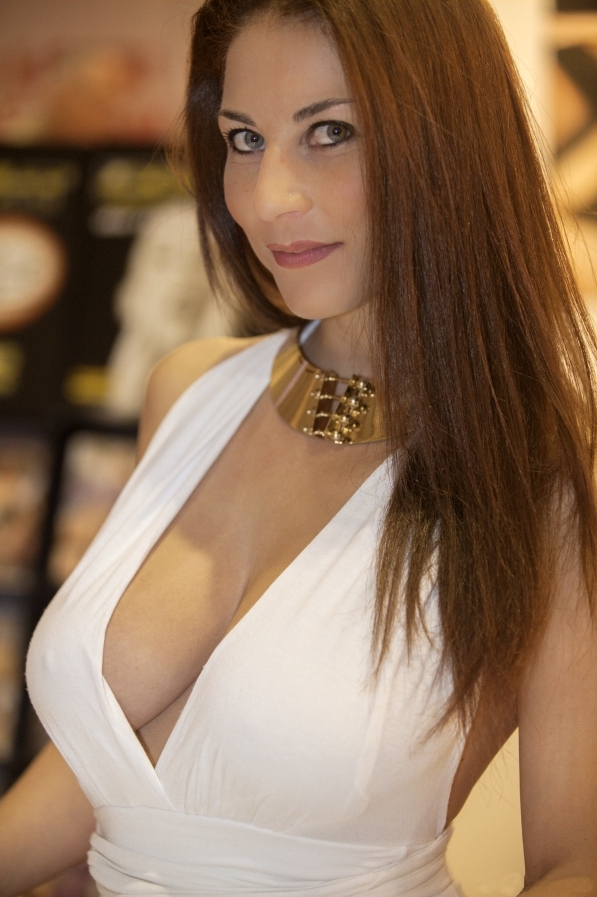
- Roberta Gemma in 2012
- Born: Floriana Panella; 15 December 1980 (age 45); Marino, Lazio, Italy
- Other name: Roberta Missoni
- Height: 168 cm (5 ft 6 in)

Floriana Panella (born 15 December 1980), best known by her stage name Roberta Gemma or Roberta Missoni, is an Italian actress related to porn and horror movies.

== Biography ==
She started her career in 2006. In 2008, she won the Miss Maglietta Bagnata pageant. That same year, Gemma was the "madrina" and the hostess of the PesarHorrorFest, a horror film festival set in Pesaro. She has starred in several horror and comedy films.

== Horror filmography ==
- House of Flesh Mannequins (2009)
- Bloody Sin (2011)
- The Transparent Woman (2015)
- A Taste of Phobia (2017)

== Awards ==
- 2006 Eroticline Awards - Best Newcomer International
- 2007 Eroticline Awards - Outstanding Achievement
- 2008 Eroticline Awards - Best Cross Over Star 2008 International
- 2010 Venus Awards - Best Actress (Europe)
- 2011 Venus Awards - Best Female Actress
- 2012 Venus Awards - Crossover Star
- 2023 Doppio Senso Night Special Award
