= Jade Laroche =

French model

- Born: 8 September 1989 (age 36); Rouen, France
- Occupations: Model; DJ; Pornographic Actress
- Years active: 2009–2011

Jade Laroche (born 8 September 1989) is a French model, DJ and former pornographic actress.

== Early life ==
Born in Rouen, where she lived until the age of 10 years, Laroche is the daughter of a military officer. While studying law at the Bordeaux University, looking for a small job, she started working as a stripper in nightclubs, then was approached by an agency which organizes erotic shows in the cities of France that introduced her to the adult industry. She debuted in adult industry in the spring of 2009 in a scene with actor y.Hassaine .

== Career ==
In 2010, Laroche starred in the music video of the song "Other City" by Tom Snare. The same year, she was spokesmodel of the real estate company Touspromoteurs.com, starring in an advertising campaign that raised some controversy because of being considered offensive. Laroche received the Venus Award for Best New Starlet in 2010.

Laroche left the porn industry in late 2011 to pursue a career as a DJ.
