= Tanya Hansen =

Norwegian pornographic actress (born 1973)

- Born: 11 September 1973 (age 52); Jessheim, Norway
- Other name: Tanja Karina Hansen
- Occupations: stripper, pornographic actress
- Known for: editor, magazines Cocktail and Lek
- Awards: Venus Award

Tanya Hansen (born 11 September 1973) is a Norwegian pornographic actress. Before entering the adult industry, she worked as a stripper.

== Career ==
Hansen moved from Jessheim when she finished high school and began performing in strip clubs in Oslo and appearing in softcore magazines; shortly thereafter, she started performing in adult movies.

She was editor of two Norwegian magazines, Cocktail and Lek. In 1999, Hansen hosted the P3 radio program Opptur. In 2005, she launched the clothing store "Paparazzi" and the online store "Fashion Diva". She also appeared on advertisements and commercials for the telecommunications company Telenor.

== Awards and nominations ==
- 2001 Venus Award nominee – Best European Actress
- 2003 Venus Award winner – Best Actress (Scandinavia)
