= Mystim =

German sex toy manufacturer

Mystim GmbH
- Company type: GmbH
- Industry: Consumer Goods
- Founded: Mömbris, Germany (2005)
- Founder: Christoph Hofmann
- Products: Luxury erotic toys
- Website: www.mystim.com

Mystim is a German manufacturer of sex toys. Its main focus is a range of toys and devices for erotic electrostimulation complemented by non-e-stim toys such as vibrators, dildos or cock rings. The company is based in Mömbris and distributes worldwide.

== History ==
Mystim GmbH was founded in 2005 by Christoph Hofmann. According to him, the founding was a direct reaction to the increasing demand he noted during his work for a medical engineering company that produces electric current devices and applications for therapeutical and medical use. The brand Mystim was to manufacture specialized products that allow electric current to be used safely and risk free in an erotic context. The e-stim devices for instance conform to the German law and secondary legislation for medical devices.

== Design ==
The design of Mystim's toys and devices as well as the packaging of their products and overall appearance of the brand is marked by a notable absence of profane images and blatant eroticism.

== Awards ==
In 2013, Mystim received the Venus Award for the best new toy line for their series of vibrators with built-in electrostimulation at the Venus Berlin erotic fair as well as the ErotiX Award for the most innovative product line of the b2b erotic fair eroFame in Hanover.
