= Monique Covét =

Hungarian adult film actress & businessperson (born 1976)

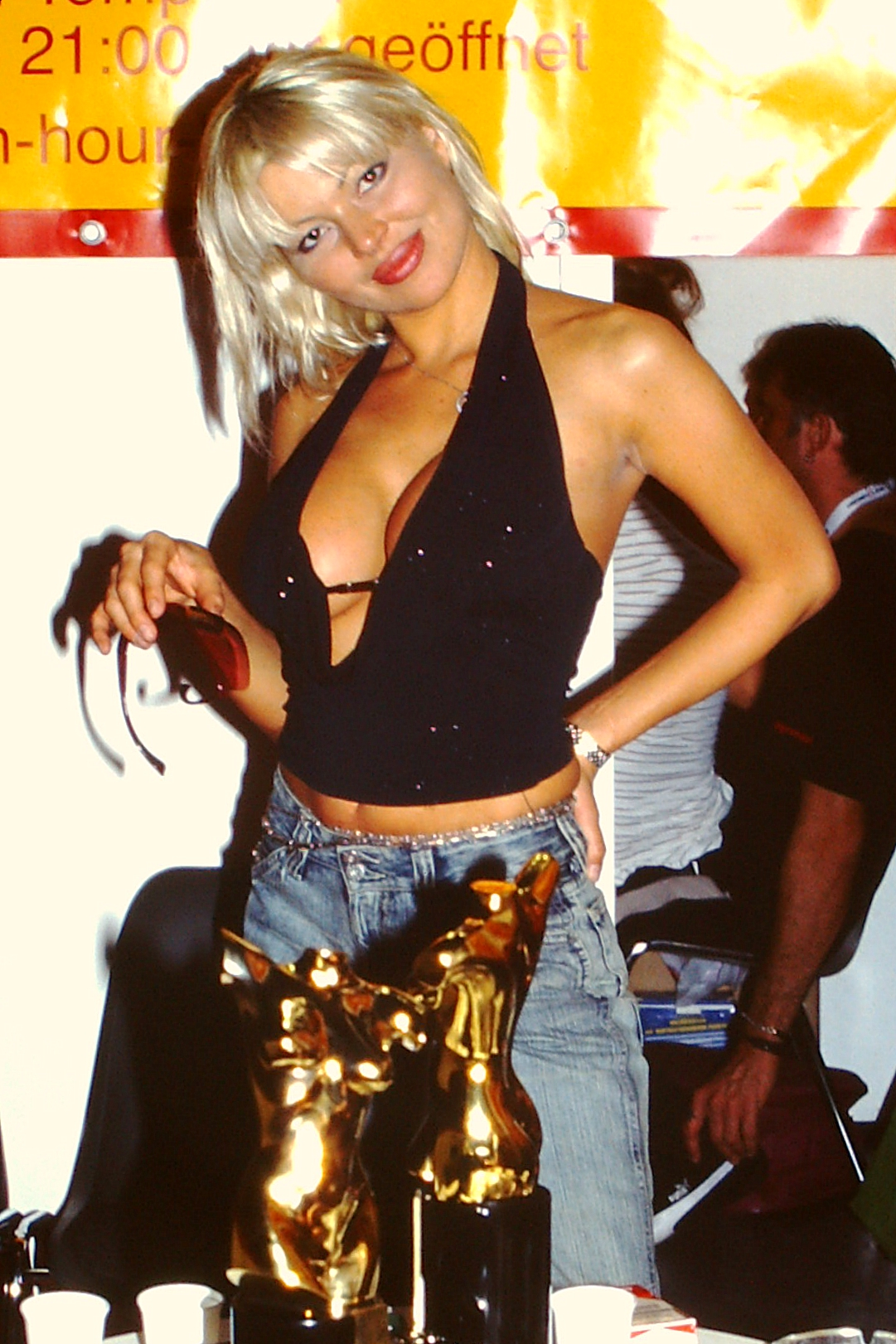
- Covét at the Berlin Erotic Film Festival 2004
- Born: Mónika Visi; 14 July 1976 (age 50); Budapest, Hungary
- Other names: Monica Cairns; Monica Cancellieri; Monique Covee; Monique Covet; Monique Covét; Monica; Monika Spermalover; Monika Tanner
- Occupations: Pornographic actress; fetish model; glamour model; sexologist
- Height: 5 ft 7 in (1.70 m)
- Website: moniquewellbeing.com

Monique Covét (born Mónika Visi; 14 July 1976) is a Hungarian pornographic actress, fetish model, glamour model, and sexologist. She achieved international fame from 1998 as an exclusive model for Private Media Group working worldwide. Following her international porn career, she moved to Rome and studied fashion design. In 2015, she was awarded a Diploma in Fashion and Design from Accademia del Lusso, Roma. In 2019, she graduated as a sexologist and began working in this field, continuing her studies further. She launched online advice on sexuality and personal relationships. In 2024, she received additional certification as a personal relationship coach and counsellor. She is fluent in English, German, Italian, and Hungarian.

== Early career ==
By her own account, Monique Covét started her hardcore porn career almost by accident. After arriving in Paris for what she believed was another series of routine modeling shoots, her agent there recommended her for a Private Media casting session where she met French hardcore director and actor Pierre Woodman. "They offered me a lead role right away as they said I had star quality", she said. "I am the kind of person who tries everything once. Everyone was so kind to me. I thought that if this is the situation, why not try it?". In 2015, Covét was described in the film Best of Private 50th Anniversary as "one of the five most legendary and formative porn actresses of the past 50 years".

== Personal life ==
Details of her life and career are featured in the book Hungarian Female Adult Models. In 2022, Monique collaborated with writer Havas Henrik on a book, Pornósztár Diplomával: A Felnőttfilmes Oscaroktól a Szexuális Tanácsadásig (English translation: Pornstar with a Degree: From Adult Film Oscars to Sexual Counselling).

== Awards ==
- 1998 Private Girl of the Year Award
- 2000 Venus Award Best Actress Eastern Europe
- 2001 Venus Award Winner Best Actress Europe
- 2001 Zeus Award in Switzerland
- 2002 Sexhajón dij
- 2004 Brussels Erotic Film Festival European X Awards – Lifetime Achievement Award
- 2004 Sexiest Porn Actress
- 2005 Magyar Porn Oscar Best Actress
- 2005 and 2006 Lifetime Achievement Awards
- 2006 Hardest Sex Award
