= Kovi =

Hungarian pornographic film director

- Born: Kovács István; 24 January 1957; Budapest
- Occupation: Film director
- Notable work: The Splendor of Hell

István Kovács, also known as Kovi (24 January 1957) is a Hungarian pornographic film director. He is regarded as The King of Porn.

== Awards and nominations ==
- 2002 AVN Award winner – Best Director, Foreign Release (The Splendor of Hell - Pirate Video DeLuxe)
- 2003 Venus Award winner - Best Director (Europe)
