= Frauentausch =

- Logo of Frauentausch
- Developed by: Otto Steiner; Ulrich Brock
- Opening theme: A*Teens – "Mamma Mia"
- Country of origin: Germany
- Original language: German
- No. of episodes: 275

Production
- Running time: 90 minutes
- Production companies: Constantin Entertainment GmbH; Prisma Entertainment Production

Original release
- Network: RTL 2
- Release: 14 July 2003 – present

Frauentausch is a German docu-soap with the same premise as the British television show Wife Swap. The concept involves temporarily swapping one family member between two families.

The docu-soap premiered on 14 July 2003. The show runs every Thursday at 9:15 p.m. as part of the evening lineup of commercial broadcast channel RTL II. It is produced by Constantin Entertainment GmbH. Reruns are shown on weekday mornings.

== Content ==
Each episode of the docu-soap shows two women—as well as, alternatively, one or two (gay) men—who swap households and live with another family for 10 days. The 90-minute program depicts how the participants struggle with, among other things, homesickness, a longing for their families and problems adapting to the environment.

In order to increase the tension and potential for conflict, the producers of the show often tend to choose women who come from different backgrounds and have strongly contrasting ways of life such as, for example, rural and suburban families or pious and atheist families.

This program is similar to other Wife Swap programs, when, for ten days, wives exchange homes and families. They are allowed to advise each other through a video and information cards. They meet blindfolded, halfway en route to their new homes. They are allowed to greet each other, then are later asked for their impression of the meeting.

On the tenth and last day of the swap the wives prepare for their trip home, and say goodbye to their substitute families. At the halfway point en route to their apartments, the women or men meet each other again. They might give each other advice on what they can change or talk about problems encountered, etc. Sometimes the discussions end in insults or even in violence. Finally their arrival at their own home and how their families receive them are shown.

On 18 May 2006 the hundredth episode was shown with a big anniversary special. It was shown whether the lives of the families who have taken part in Frauentausch have changed or whether there are new friendships between some families.

Prisma Film produces with Tausche Familie a similarly successful format for Austrian television.
