= Teresa Orlowski =

Polish/German pornographic actress and film producer (born 1953)

- Born: Teresa Orłowska; 29 July 1953 (age 73); Wrocław, Poland
- Other names: Teresa Orlowsky; Lady Teresa; Teresa Orlowska
- Occupations: Pornographic film actress; director

Teresa Orlowski (born 29 July 1953) is a retired Polish-German pornographic film actress and currently a producer of pornographic films in Germany. She was one of the biggest European porn-stars of the 80s.

== Early life ==
She was born as Teresa Orłowska on 29 July 1953 in Wrocław, Poland and spent her childhood in Dębica, a small city near Tarnów. Despite being Polish, Orlowski is considered the first true German porn-star. A former veterinary assistant, she came to West-Germany in 1979 and worked first in a nightclub in Wattenscheid, later in a bar at Duisburg Central Station. In 1982, she married pornographic films director and photographer Hans Moser.

== Career ==
She debuted in 1983 in the film Foxy Lady, directed by her then-husband Hans Moser. She starred in two early examples of interactive pornography, Mopsparade (1994) and Teresa O. The CD-ROM edition (1995). Together with Moser, she founded the Hannover-based adult production company "VTO" (Verlag Teresa Orlowski/Video Teresa Orlowski); the company went bankrupt after a few years. After her retirement from the adult industry, she moved to Marbella.

In addition, Orlowski starred in the music video "Bitte, bitte" by Die Ärzte in 1989. In 1986, Larry Bonville recorded the song Fire inside for Teresa Orlowski.
