= Schicksale – und plötzlich ist alles anders =

- Country of origin: Germany

Schicksale – und plötzlich ist alles anders (Fates - and suddenly everything is different) is a German television series.

== See also ==
- List of German television series
