= Venus Award =

German pornographic film award

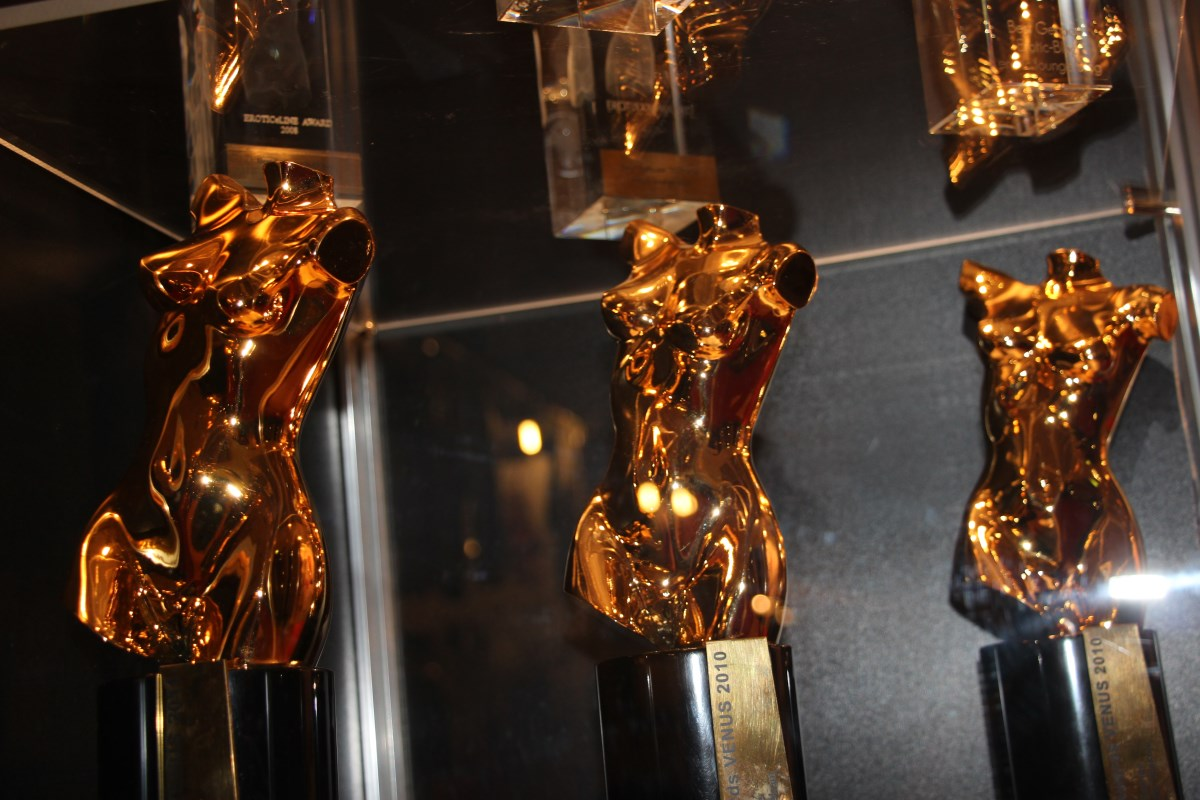
- Venus Award trophies
- Location: Berlin
- Country: Germany
- Website: www.venus-berlin.com/en/

The Venus Award is a film award in the adult film industry presented yearly in Berlin since 1997 as part of the Venus Berlin, an international erotic trade festival, on the exhibition grounds at the Funkturm.

Prizes are offered in some 30 categories and there are live strip stage shows with topless bull riding, oil wrestling and simulated live sex. The Venus Awards are unique in that directors, performers and films from the same country (Germany, France, the United States, etc.) compete for honors with other entities from that same country, while all entries also remain eligible for the "European" and "International" award categories. The International Venus Fair for 16–19 October 2003 had attendance figures of around 40,000.

From 2005 to 2009, the Eroticline Awards were presented instead, with the Venus Awards returning in 2010.

== 1997 Venus Awards ==
- Top Seller (USA) - Dragon Lady
- Top Seller (Europe) - Private Stories
- Best Film (USA) - Clockwork Orgy
- Best Film (Europe) - Le Prix dela Luxure
- Best Director (USA) - Max Hardcore
- Best Director (Europe) - Mario Salieri
- Best Actor (USA) - Valentino
- Best Actor (Europe) - Rocco Siffredi
- Best Actress (USA) - Rebecca Wild
- Best Actress (Europe) - Sarah Young
- Top Seller (Gay) - Club Paradise
- Best Director (Gay) - Jean-Daniel Cadinot
- Best Film (Gay) - Anchor Hotel
- Top Seller (Germany) - Lydia P
- Best Film (Germany) - Top Mission
- Best Camera (Germany) - Lars Gordon
- Best Series Director (Germany) - Harry S. Morgan
- Best Director (Germany) - Dino Baumberger
- Best Actor (Germany) - Steve Vincent
- Best Actress (Germany) - Kelly Trump
- Special Venus for Outstanding Input (Male) - Jean Pierre Armand
- Special Venus for Outstanding Input (Female) - Dolly Buster
- Special Venus for Lifetime Achievements - Beate Uhse

== 1998 Venus Awards ==
- Best Film - Baron of Darkness
- Best Director - Michael Ninn
- Best Actor - Conny Dax
- Best Actress - Tania Russof
- Best Newcomer, Male - Titus
- Best Newcomer, Female - Donna Vargas
- Best Camera - Kaito
- Best Series Director - Paul Rusch
- Best Video Series - Dolly Buster
- Gay Best Film - Island Guardian
- Gay Best Actor - York Powers
- Best Artwork Cover - Bezaubernde Jeannie
- Best Soft Video - Helen Meets Monique
- Best Magazine - Pirate
- Best Photographer - James Baes
- Best Soft Magazine - Penthouse
- Best TV Magazine - Peep
- Best TV Erotic Report - Dark Angel
- Venus Erotic Design Award - Schwarze Mode
- Venus Fetish Award - Peter W. Czernich
- Venus Erotic Innovation Award - Private Media Group
- Special Venus For Outstanding Input (male) - Gabriell Pontello
- Special Venus For Outstanding Input (female) - Babette Blue
- Special Venus For Lifetime Achievements - Hans Moser
- Venus '98 Sonderpreis - Princess Chantal Chevalier

== 1999 Venus Awards ==
- Best Actress (Germany) - Kelly Trump
- Starlet of the Year - Wanda Curtis
- Best Film (International) - Sex Shot

== 2000 Venus Awards ==
- Best Film - The Net
- Best American Film - Nothing to Hide 3 & 4
- Best Gay Film - Dschungel-Boys
- Best Actor (German) - Titus Steel
- Best Actor (European) - Rocco Siffredi
- Best Actress (European) - Betina Campbell
- Best Actress (German) - Gina Wild
- Best American Actress - Tina Cheri
- Best Gay Actor (German) - Hal Hart
- Best Starlet (German) - Julia Taylor
- Best Video Series - Excuse Me
- Best Television Erotica - PEEP!
- Best Director (German) - Nils Molitor
- Best Softcore Video - Tips und Tricks einer Erotik-Queen
- Best Cover - Nikita X
- Country Award: France - Marc Dorcel
- Country Award: Scandinavia - Max's
- Country Award: Benelux - Helen Duval
- Best Photography - Guido Thomasi
- Best Internet Presence - Beate Uhse AG
- Lifetime Achievement Award - Dolly Buster

== 2001 Venus Awards ==
- Best Actress (USA) - Bridgette Kerkove
- Best Director (USA) - Pierre Woodman
- Best Movie (USA) - Les Vampyres (Metro Studios)
- Best Company in America - Leisure Time Entertainment
- Best European Actor - Toni Ribas
- Best European Actress - Monique Covét
- Innovation of the Year - Berth Milton (Private Media Group)
- Country Award (Spain) - Girls of Private
- Country Award (France) - Marc Dorcel
- Country Award (Italy) - Mario Salieri
- Country Award (Scandinavia) - Beate Uhse Max's Film AB
- Best European Movie - Divina
- Best German Starlet - Tara Young
- Best German Starlet (Male) - Sachsen Paule
- Best German Actress - Kelly Trump
- Best German Actor - Zenza Raggi
- Best German Director - Harry S. Morgan
- Best German Movie - Matressen
- German Company of the Year - MMV
- Best Video Series in Germany - XXL
- Best Cover - German Beauty
- Best Soft Video - Die Teufelsinsel
- Best Erotic Photographer (Germany) - Uwe Kempen
- Newcomer Company of the Year (Germany) - Inflagranti
- Best German Gay Actor - Antoine Mallet
- Best German Gay Movie - C'est la vie
- Best DVD Product - U-Bahn Girls
- Venus Honorary Award - Teresa Orlowski
- Lifetime Achievement Award - Dirk Rothermund
- Best Web Design - www.dolly-buster.com
- Best Web Content - www.beate-uhse.de
- Internet Innovation (Presentation) - www.pelladytower.com

== 2002 Venus Awards ==
- Best DVD Product (Germany) - U-Bahn Girls II (Videorama)
- Best DVD Authoring (Germany) - New Media Group Enterprises (Goldlight)
- Best Cum-Shot Scene (Germany) - Betty Extrem - GGG - (VPS)
- Best Video Series (Germany) - Boulevard - (DBM)
- Best Video Series (Germany) - Excuse Me - (Videorama)
- Best Video Series (Germany) - Golden Series - (Tabu)
- Best Soft Film (Germany) - Manche mögen's heiß - (J.Mutzenbacher/Trimax)
- Best Soft Film (Germany) - Venus Girls - (VNM)
- Best Soft Series (Germany) - Better Sex Line - (Orion)
- Best Soft Series (Germany) - Cover Girls - (VNM)
- Best Cover (Germany) - Crossroads - (Videorama)
- Best Product Campaign (Germany) - Gladiator - (Private Media Group)
- Best Product Campaign (Germany) - Mandy Mystery Line - (Orion)
- Best Director (Germany) - Nils Molitor
- Best Director (Germany) - Horst Billian
- Best Director (Germany) - Ferdi Hillmann
- Best Film (Germany) - Faust - (Goldlight)
- Best Film (Germany) - Hart & Herzlich - (Videorama)
- Best Film (Germany) - Sexhexen - (MMV)
- Best New Actress (Germany) - Kyra
- Best New Actress (Germany) - Tyra Misoux
- Best New Actress (Germany) - CoCo Brown
- Best New Company (Europe) - Hustler Germany
- Special Award (Eastern Europe) - Kovi
- Special Award (Scandinavia) - Max's Sweden
- Special Award (France) - Marc Dorcel
- Best Movie (Europe) - Gladiator - (Private Media Group)
- Best Movie (Europe) - Faust - (Goldlight)
- Best Director (Europe) - Mario Salieri
- Best Director (Europe) - Antonio Adamo
- Best Actor (Europe) - Toni Ribas
- Best Actress (Eastern Europe) - Monique Covét
- Best Actress (Eastern Europe) - Rita Faltoyano
- Best Gay Film - Russian Village Boys - (Man's Best)
- Best Gay Director - Jean-Daniel Cadinot
- Best Actress (USA) - Tera Patrick
- Best Actress (USA) - Jodie Moore
- Best Movie (USA) - Perfect - (Private Media Group)
- Best Movie (USA) - Taboo 2001 - (Touch Video)
- Best Director (USA) - Andrew Blake
- Best Director (USA) - Pierre Woodman
- Best Video Series (International) - Barely Legal - (Hustler Video)
- Best Internet Presentation - www.privatespeed.com
- Product Innovation Bio Glide - Joydivision
- Innovation of the Year - Private-PDA
- Innovation of the Year - ErotikCinema.de (Musketier)
- Company of the Year (Germany) - Goldlight
- Company of the Year (Germany) - MMV
- Company of the Year (Germany) - Videorama
- Best Actor (Germany) - Horst Baron
- Best Actor (Germany) - Titus
- Best Actor (Germany) - Claudio Meloni
- Best Actress (Germany) - Isabel Golden
- Best Actress (Germany) - Anja Juliette Laval
- Best Actress (Germany) - Mandy Mystery
- Lifetime Achievement Award (Germany) - Moli

== 2003 Venus Awards ==
- Best Actor (Europe) - Rocco Siffredi
- Best Actress (Hungary) - Michelle Wild
- Best Actress (Europe) - Julia Taylor
- Best Soft Movie Germany - Fesselnde Knotenkunst Aus Fernost (Orion)
- Best Film - Benelux Wasteland (Bizarre Spielchen/Magmafilm)
- Best Film (Spain) - The Fetish Garden
- Best Film (France) - Melanie (La Jouisseuse/VMD)
- Best Film (Scandinavia) - Pink Prison
- Best Film (USA) - Space Nuts (Wicked Pictures)
- Best Film (Hungary) - The Garden of Seduction
- Best Film (Italy) - La Dolce Vita
- Best Film (Germany) - Die 8.Sünde (The 8th Sin - Magmafilm)
- Best Film (Europe) - Cleopatra
- Best Video Series (International) - Balls Deep (Anabolic)
- Best Video Series (Germany) - Black Hammer (VNM By VPS)
- Best Gay Movie (International) - French Erection (Ikarus Film)
- Best Erotic PC Game - Casablanca 1942 (Red Fire Software/VPS)
- Best Erotic Stage Show - Tammy's Erotic Show
- Best Cover (Germany) - Fesselnde Knotenkunst Aus Fernost (Orion)
- Best Director (France) - Alain Payet
- Best Director (Italy) - Mario Salieri
- Best Gay Director (International) - Jean-Daniel Cadinot
- Best Erotic Magazine (Germany) - Coupe
- Best Internet Presence - pelladytower.com
- Best Erotic Idea - Poppp-Stars/Beate Uhse
- Best DVD Product (Germany) - Triebige Swinger
- Best DVD Product (Europe) - La Dolce Vita
- Distribution Company Of The Year Germany - Orion
- Company of the Year - MMV (Multi Media Verlag)
- Innovation of the Year - Dolly Buster at Vodafone-live
- Special Product Award - Nature Skin Toys/Orion
- Special Jury Awards - Marc Anthony (Private), www.private.com & Dolly Buster
- Special Honorary Awards - Gerd Wasmund (alias Mike Hunter) & Harry S. Morgan
- Best New Starlet (USA) - Sunrise Adams (Vivid)
- Best Actor (USA) - Lexington Steele (VNM)
- Best New Starlet (Hungary) - Maya Gold (Luxx Video)
- Best Director (Hungary) - Don Sigfredo (DBM)
- Best Director (Scandinavia) - Nike Beck (Tabu)
- Best Actress (Scandinavia) - Tanya Hansen (Tabu)
- Best New Starlet (Europe) - Laura Angel
- Best Actress (France) - Mélanie Coste (VMD)
- Best New Starlet (Germany) - Sharon Da Vale (Inflagranti)
- Best Director (Germany) - Nils Molitor (Magmafilm)
- Best Director (Europe) - Kovi (Luxx Video)
- Best Actor (Germany) - Conny Dax (Magmafilm)
- Best Actress (Germany) - Denise La Bouche (MMV)

== 2004 Venus Awards ==
- Best Cover (Germany) - Der Club des anspruchsvollen Herrn (Videorama)
- Best Newcomer Label (Germany) - Bad Ass (Playhouse)
- Best Newcomer Company (Germany) - EVS
- Best Gay Director (International) - Marcel Bruckmann
- Best Gay Movie (International) - Sex Around the Clock (S.E.V.P.)
- Print Reports Italy, UK and Germany (Jury-Award) - Hot News/ETO/Medien E-Line
- Special Product Campaign Germany (Jury-Award) - Testosteron Power-Pack No.1 (No Limit)
- Special Marketing Campaign Germany (Jury-Award) - www.missbusty.de (VNM)
- Special Video Production (Jury-Award) - German Goo Girls (John Thompson Productions)
- Special Video Series (Jury-Award) - Arschparade (MMV)
- TOP Erotic TV Show (Jury-Award) - Lust Pur Mit Conny Dax (Beate Uhse TV)
- Special Internet Site (Jury-Award) - www.ueber18.de
- Special Eastern Europe Award (Jury-Award) - Ference Hopka
- Special German Company (Jury-Award) - Muschi Video
- Successful Video Series Germany (Jury-Award) - Mutzenbacher (Herzog Video)
- Best DVD Product (Germany) - Millionaire (Private Media Group)
- Best Camera (Germany) - Nils Molitor
- Best Video Series (Germany) - H D S S S G (DBM)
- Best Soft Movie (Germany) - Bettenwechsel in Dänemark (Orion Versand)
- Best Actress (Hungary) - Nikky Blond
- Best Gonzo Movie/Series (International) - Apprentass (Playhouse)
- Best B2C Website (International) - www.FunDorado.com (Orion Versand)
- Best Internet Presence (International) - www.DejanProduction.de
- Best Director (Italy) - Mario Salieri - Penocchio (Goldlight)
- Best New Starlet Female (France) - Priscila Sol
- Special Award Benelux (Jury-Award) - SEXY (Shots Video)
- Best Company Spain (Jury-Award) - IFG
- Special Europe Video Series (Jury-Award) - Anabolic (Anabolic Video)
- International Actress (Jury-Award) - Katja Kassin
- Best Movie (USA) - Compulsion (Elegant Angel)
- Best Director (USA) - Robby D. - Jack's Playground (Digital Playground)
- Best Movie (France) - Parfum du Desir (Video Marc Dorcel)
- Best Movie (Italy) - Life (Pink O)
- Best New Starlet Female (Europe) - Cristina Bella
- Best Actor (Europe) - Nacho Vidal
- Best Video Series (Europe) - Rocco's Sexy Girls (MMV)
- Best Website (Germany) - www.dolly-buster.de (DBM)
- Distribution Company of the Year (Germany) - VPS Film-Entertainment
- Best Director (Germany) - Harry S. Morgan
- Best Actor (Germany) - Markus Waxenegger
- Best New Starlet Female (Germany) - Janine LaTeen
- Best New Starlet Female (Germany) - Vivian Schmitt
- Top Toy Product Line (Jury-Award) - Silvia Saint Toy Line (Orion)
- A.o.P. (Jury-Award) - Steve Holmes
- Successful Video Series Europe (Jury-Award) - Lexington (VNM)
- Best Actress (USA) - Jesse Jane
- Company of the Year (Germany) - Mulit Media Verlag
- Best Movie (Germany) - Penocchio (Goldlight)
- Best Actress (Germany) - Tyra Misoux
- Best Movie (Europe) - Millionaire (Private Media Group)
- Best Director (Europe) - Kovi
- Best Actress (Europe) - Katsuni
- Special Actress (Jury-Award) - Monique Covét
- Honorary Award (International) - Berth Milton

== 2010 Venus Awards ==
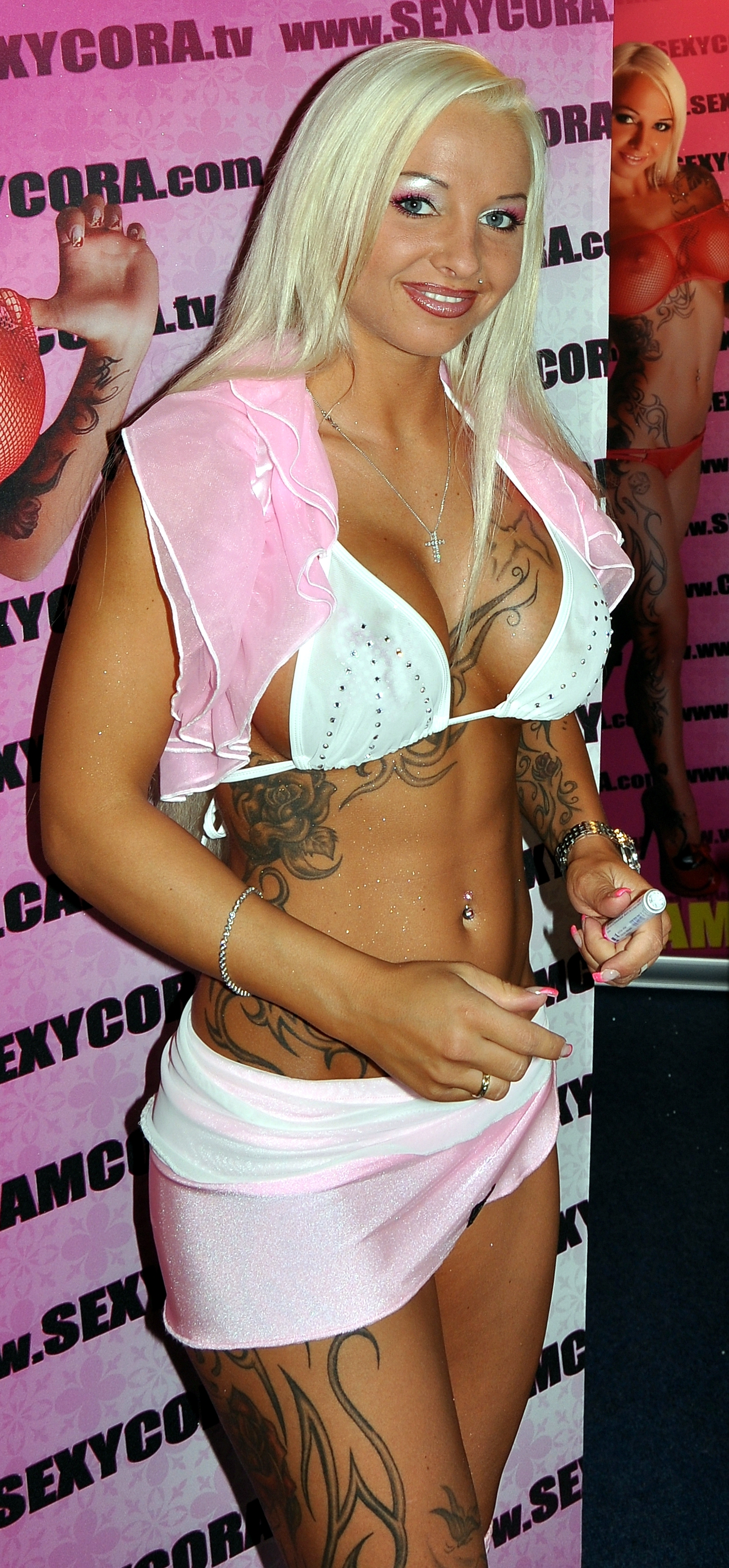
Sexy Cora at the 2010 Venus Awards, Berlin

- Best Magazine (Germany) - Happy Weekend
- Best Erotic Retail Store (Germany) - Ego Erotikfachmarkt
- Best Redlight Portal (Germany) - Berlinintim.de
- Best European Erotic Online Offer (Europe) - MoMo-net.com
- Best Web Innovation (International) - Amateurflatrate.com (DBM)
- Best Adult TV Channel (Germany) - Hustler TV Deutschland
- Best VoD Offer (Germany) - Erotic Lounge
- Best Webcam Girl (International) - Gina (goldmodels.de/livestrip.com)
- Best Director (International) - Allegro Swing
- Best Newcomer Company (International) - Parliament/CZ
- Best Manga Series (International) - Trimax
- Best Video Series (Germany) - Magma Swing (Magmafilm)
- Best Newcomer (Europe) - Vittoria Risi
- Best Actress (Europe) - Roberta Gemma
- Erotic Fetish Lifestyle Magazine - PO Magazin
- Best Mobile Entertainment Company - Pinksim! (Pink Adventure AG)
- Feature Movie with Celebrity Star (Special Jury Award) - Cindy in Heat (Paradise)
- Best Online Distribution System (Germany) - Partnercash
- Best Internet Portal (Germany) - Fundorado.de
- Best Website Amateur (Germany) - MyDirtyHobby.com
- Best Movie (Germany) - Die Viper (Goldlight)
- Best Movie (Europe) - Lethal Body (ATV Group)
- Special Jury Award - Sofia Gucci
- Best Video Series (Europe) - Russian Institute (Marc Dorcel)
- Best Video Series (International) - Titus on Tour (Erotic Planet)
- Best Amateur Actress (Germany) - Sexy Cora
- Best Newcomer (International) - Jade Laroche
- Best Actress (International) - Kayden Kross
- Best Toy Series (International) - Sexy Cora Toys (Orion)
- Best VoD Offer (Europe) - DORCEL TVoD and SVoD platform
- Best HD Offer (International) - Erotic Lounge
- Fair Management (Special Jury Award) - X-Show Moskau
- Internet Business (Special Jury Award) - EUROWEBTAINMENT (Gunnar Steger)
- Innovation Mobile (Special Jury Award) - My Dirty Mobile.de
- Best VoD Offer (International) - Sapphire Media International B.V.
- Best Adult TV Channel (Europe) - Dorcel TV
- Best Adult TV Channel (International) - Hustler TV
- Video Provider of the Year (Germany) - EROTIC PLANET
- Best Movie (International) - Body Heat (Digital Playground)
- Best Actress (Germany) - Vivian Schmitt
- Best HD TV Channel - Penthouse HD
- European Film and Video Cooperation (Special Jury Award) - GOLDLIGHT
- Movie and Film (Special Jury Award) - This Ain't Avatar XXX (Hustler Video)
- Movie-Internet Innovation (Special Jury Award) - Saboom (Partnercash)
- Company of the Year - Penthouse
- Movie Innovation of the Year - Dorcel 3D (Marc Dorcel)
- Business Woman of the Year - Nicole Kleinhenz

== 2011 Venus Awards ==
- Best Erotic Mobile Application - Bleepersex
- Best Erotic Designer - Adult Profi
- Special Erotic Performer - Pussykate
- Best DVD Online Erotic Store/Blu-ray - dvderotik.com
- Best Payment System - www.payment-network.com
- Best Director - Ettore Buchi
- Most Innovative Amateur Projects - Aische Pervers
- Best New Erotic Affiliate Program - www.immocash.de
- Best New Amateur DVD Series - MyDirtyHobby
- Best Adult TV Channel - Hustler TV Germany
- Best Fetish Website - www.clips4sale.com
- Best Website Commercial - www.fundorado.com
- Best VoD Offer - Sapphire Media International B.V.
- Best Erotic Lifestyle Magazine - Penthouse Germany
- Best Newcomer Actress - Anna Polina
- Best Male Actor - Pornofighter Long John
- Best Newcomer Amateur Girl - Sweet-Selina
- Best Redlight Portal - www.berlinintim.de
- Best Mobile Website - www.clipmobile.de
- Best Toy Series International - Love to Love by Lovely Planet
- Best Feature Movie - 007 Golden Ass (Paradise Film Entertainment)
- Best Adult Trade Magazine - Sign EUROPE
- Best Erotic Entertainment Duo - Maria Mia & Sharon da Vale
- Best HD Channel - Hustler TV
- Best Amateur DVD Series - Sexy Cora Amateurstars
- Best New Adult Company - Magik View Entertainment
- Best Erotic Affiliate Program - www.partnercash.com
- Outstanding Acting Progress - Lena Nitro
- Best Erotic TV Format - Babestand Productions
- Most Ambitious High-End Productions - Mission Ass Possible/Smuggling Sexpedition (Private Media Group)
- Best Amateur Girl - Lea4You
- Best Design Innovation - Je Joue
- Best VoD Offer - www.erotic-lounge.com
- Best Innovation Internet - Saboom.com
- Best Website Amateur - MyDirtyHobby.com
- Best Female Actress - Roberta Gemma
- International Successful Video Company - Goldlight
- Best Adult TV Channel - Hustler TV
- Best TV Presentation by Erotic Star - Stella Styles
- Best Video Series - Soulbrettes Services (Marc Dorcel)
- Business Woman of the Year - Kelly Holland
- Best Blockbuster of the Year - Mission Ass Possible (Private Media Group)

== 2012 Venus Awards ==
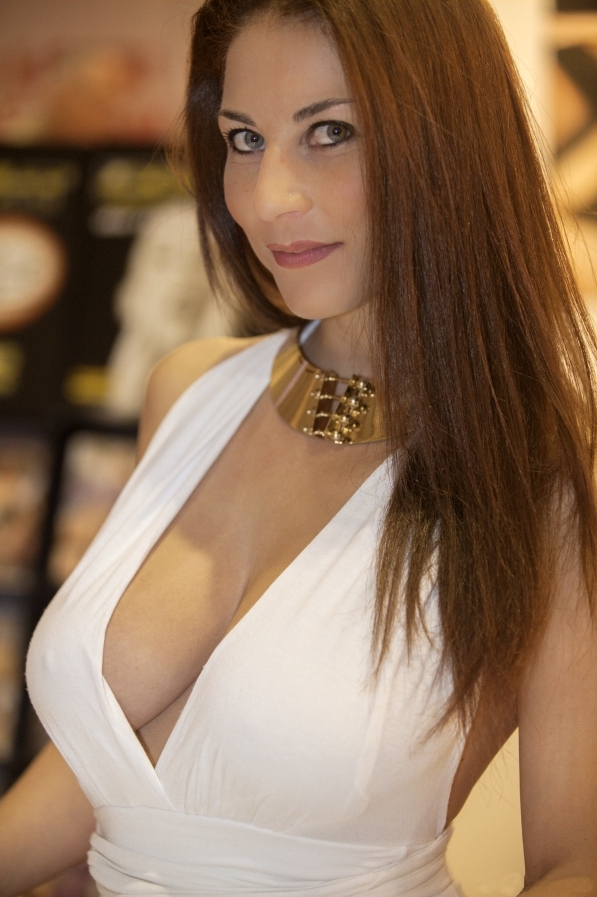
Roberta Gemma at the 2012 Venus Berlin

- Best Actor - Markus Waxxenegger
- Best Newcomer (female) - Xania Wet
- Best Actress - Lena Nitro
- Best Director - John Thompson
- Best Amateur Girl - Aische Pervers
- Best Amateur Website - Julia Herz
- Best Innovation - Pornogutschein.com
- Best Internet Site - Fundorado.de
- Best Toy Series - FunFactory
- Best Dessous/Fashion Series - Hustler Apparel
- Best Film - Starportrait Maria Mia & Sharon da Vale
- Best Print Magazine - Penthouse
- Best Erotic TV Channel - Babestation24.de
- Best BDSM Model - Yvette Costeau
- Lifetime Achievement (female) - Biggi Bardot
- Erotic TV Format - Visit.X.TV
- All Over Internet - Erovous
- New Webstar Of The Year - Sweet-Sophie
- Featured Film for Goodbye Marilyn (Actress) - Julie Hunter
- Featured Film for Goodbye Marilyn (Actor) - Markus Waxxenegger
- Featured Film for Goodbye Marilyn (Director) - Allegro Swing
- Performance in all Areas of the German Adult Industry - Pornfighter Long John
- Crossover Star - Roberta Gemma
- Erotic Model of the Year - Micaela Schaefer
- Lifetime Achievement (male) - Ron Jeremy

== 2013 Venus Awards ==
- Best Actress - Lena Nitro
- Best Actress International - Christy Mack
- Best TV-Act - Julie Hunter
- Best Female Newcomer - Lexy Roxx
- Best Actor - Chris Hilton
- Best Label - Magmafilm
- Best Director - Tim Grenzwert
- Best Movie - Oktober Sexfest (Private Media Group)
- Best Producer - Wolfgang Embacher
- Best MILF - Sexy Susi
- Best Amateurgirl - Aische Pervers
- Best Webpage - FunDorado.com
- Best Erotic-Community - Joyclub.de
- Best Gonzo Label - Cruel Media
- Best Erotic-Guide - BERLINintim/BERLINintim-Club
- Best New Product - Penomet
- Best Live Cam Site International - LiveJasmin
- Best Licensed Toy Collection - Penthouse Pet Cyberskin Collection
- Best Magazine - Penthouse
- Best New Channel Launch - Penthouse Black
- Best Toy Design - OVO
- Best Innovation - Chathouse 3D thriXXX
- Best New Toyline - Mystim
- Jury Award - Pipedream
- Jury Award - Aileen Taylor
- Jury Award - Manuel Stallion
- Jury Award - Texas Patti

== 2014 Venus Awards ==
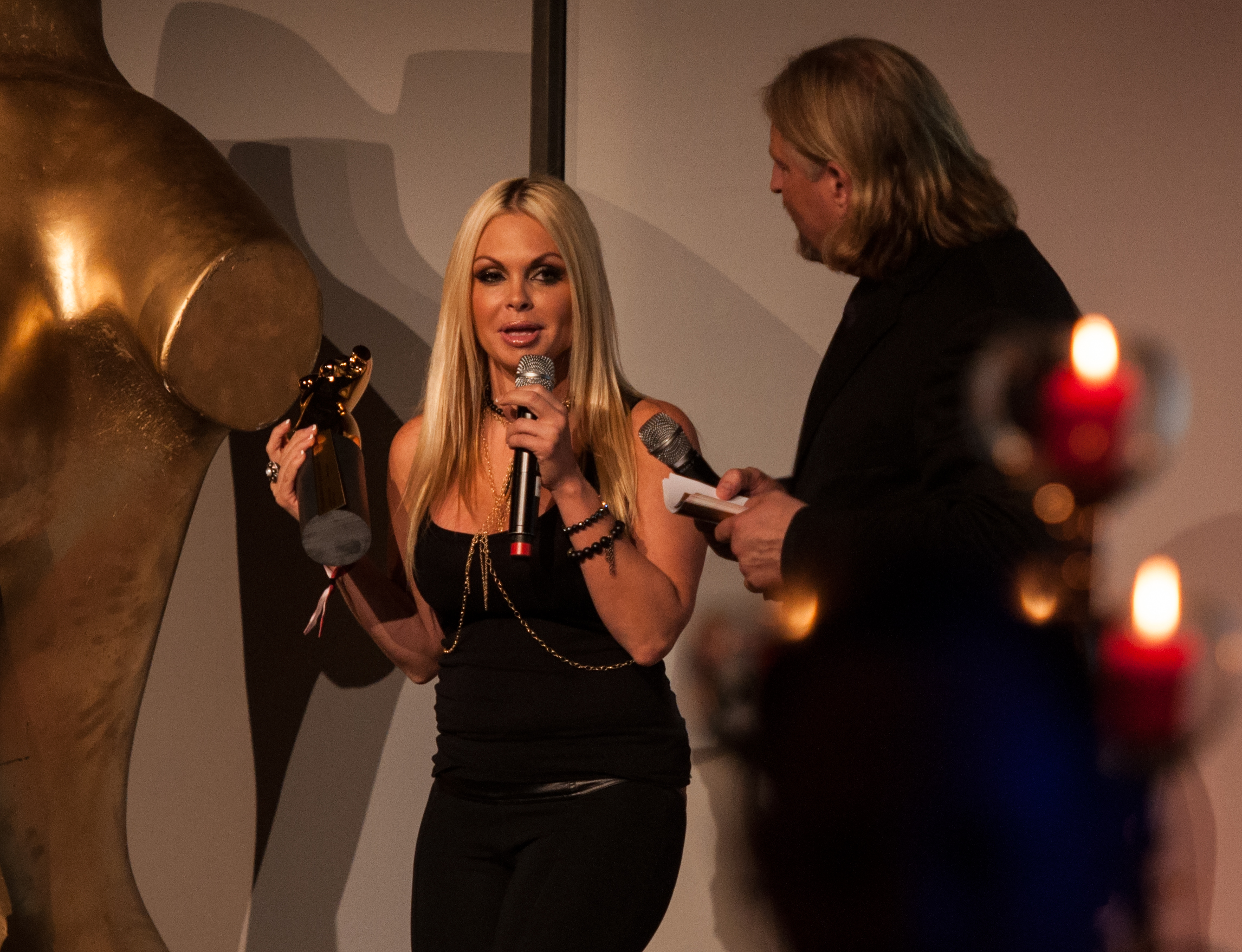
Jesse Jane at the 2014 Venus Awards, Berlin

- Best E-Stim Toyline - Mystim
- Best Website - Fundorado.de
- Best Amateur Community - Big7.de
- Best Innovation - Spankrags
- Best Erotic Offer - Erotic Lounge
- Bestselling New Toyline - Mystim
- Best Producer - John Thompson
- Best Film - Rollergirl
- Best Fetish - Zonah
- Best MILF - Lilly Ladina
- Best Actor - Jean Pallett
- Best Live Performance Female - Kitty Core
- Best Amateur Girl - RoxxyX
- Best Newcomer - Natalie Hot
- Best Actress National - Julie Hunter
- Best Actress International - Bonnie Rotten
- Best Asian Performer - PussyKat
- Best Newcomer Label - Chris Hilton Entertainment
- Jury-Award: Best Series Hard and Soft - CamGirlFarm
- Jury-Award: Best German Pay Per View Offer - Blue Movie
- Jury-Award: Best Penis Pump - Penomet (UPL Distribution GmbH)
- Jury-Award: Best Porn Career - Salma de Nora
- Jury-Award: Best Marketing Campaign - "Full on Love" (Fun Factory)
- Jury-Award: Best Cross-Media Entertainment - Fundorado.tv
- Jury-Award: Best Erotic Model - Micaela Schaefer
- Jury-Award: Lifetime Achievement - Jesse Jane
- Jury-Award: Shootingstar - Julia Pink
- Jury-Award: Best TV Report - René on Tour (USA Special/Die René Schwuchow Show)
- Jury-Award: Best Interactive Product - Penthouse Cyberskin Reality Girls

== 2015 Venus Awards ==
- Best Manufacturer - Mystim
- Best Website - Fundorado.com
- Best Amateur Community - Big7
- Best Director - Tim Grenzwert
- Best Sexparty - Erlebniswohnung
- Best Video-on-Demand Portal - erotic-lounge.com
- Best E-Stim Line - Mystim
- Most Innovative Toy (Jury Award) - Topco Sales Twerking Butt
- Best Series Soft and Hard (Jury Award) - Barcelona Heat & London Love Affairs (Beate-Uhse.TV/Blue Movie/Private)
- Gang Bang Queen (Jury Award) - Samy Saint
- Best Network of Paysites (Jury Award) - PornDoe Premium
- Best Porn Couple (Jury Award) - Mick Blue & Anikka Albrite
- Innovative Product (Jury Award) - Erotische-Hypnose.com
- Best Erotic Actress International (Jury Award) - Anike Ekina
- Best European Erotic Magazine (Jury Award) - Penthouse
- Best Pornstar (Jury Award) - Lullu Gun
- Best Series Moderation - Paula Rowe (Rowe – Sextipps vom Profi)
- Best Amateur Girl - Nina Devil
- Best MILF - Julia Pink
- Best Fetish Actor - Cobie
- Best Actor - Diether von Stein
- Best Webcamgirl - Meli Deluxe
- Best New Actress - Natalie Hot
- Fan Award - Kitty Monroe
- Best Actress - Texas Patti

== 2017 Venus Awards ==
- Best online VoD platform - Beate Uhse Movie
- Best VR site - Realitylovers.com
- Best series - Erotic Lounge Edition
- Best international label - Private
- Best Manufacturer 2017 - Mystim
- Best Network of Paysites (Jury Award) - PornDoe Premium
- Best VR Actor (Jury Award) - Patty Michova
- Best German production soft / hard (Jury award) - Sexpension Hüttenzauber
- Most Innovative Influencer Platform (Jury Award) - FANCentro
- Best domina studio Germany - Domina Studio & VIP Lounge Elegance
- Best BDSM Production - Badtime Stories, Smorlow
- Best newcomer porn film production - MariskaX
- Best cameraman - Ronny Rosetti
- Best domina studio in Europe - Casa Casal
- Best Actor - Jason Steel
- Best senior actor - Big George
- Best MILF - Dirty Tina
- Best webcam girl - RoxxyX
- Best actress - Anny Aurora
- Best Actress in Europe - Lena Nitro
- Best Actress International - Texas Patti

== 2018 Venus Awards ==
- Best amateur girl - Lucy Cat
- Best Milf International - Texas Patti
- Best Actress - Little Caprice
- Best Virtual Reality Actress - Texas Patti
- Best international show girl - Pussykat
- Best shooting star 2018 - Vika Viktoria
- Best Actress in South America - Luna Corazon
- Best Actor - Marcello Bravo
- Lifetime Achievement - Stormy Daniels
- Best Adult Coin - Proncoin
- Best New Website - Erotik.com
- Best live cam community - Visit-X.net
- Best OTT offer in Germany - Sky Q: The 18+ app
- Best Virtual Reality website - RealityLovers.com
- Best VOD portal - Erotic-lounge.com
- Best international series - "XConfessions" by Erika Lust
- Best amateur community - MyDirtyHobby
- Best production company - Big George Production
- Best Dominastudio Europe - bizarre paradise
- Best TV series soft (Jury Award) - Sexy Alm 1 to 4
- Best Manufacturer 2018 (Jury Award) - Mystim
- Best Retailer Germany 2018 (Jury Award) - 18+ GmbH
- Best Newcomer Marketing & Management Agency (Jury Award) - Pornagent
- Best innovative product (Jury award) - BANGJUICE

== 2019 Venus Awards ==
- Best VOD Offer (Germany) - Erotic-Lounge
- Best German Movie - "Höhenrausch"
- Best Amateur Community - MyDirtyHobby
- Best Cam Site - Bongacams
- Best Innovation Product - Silk'n
- Best VR Actress - Eveline Dellai
- Best Cam Girl - Tamara Milano
- Best Actor - Marcello Bravo
- Best MILF - Texas Patti
- Newcomer Shootingstar 2019 - Fiona Fuchs
- Best Amateur Girl - Hanna Secret
- Best Series - German Scout
- Best Actress Europe - Julia de Lucia
- Best Actress International - Little Caprice
- Most Creative Venus Reporter - Aaron Troschke
- Best Erotic Product - Erotische-Hypnose
- Best Erotic Flavour - Bang Juice
- Best Newcomer Marketing and Management Agency - Porn Agent
- Lifetime Award - Captain John

== See also ==
- AVN Award
- Hot d'Or
