= Brussels International Festival of Eroticism =

Brussels International Festival of Eroticism European X Awards
- Location: Brussels
- Country: Belgium
- Website: erotica-brussel.be

The Brussels International Festival of Eroticism (Dutch: International Erotica Festival van Brussel, French: Festival International de l'Érotisme de Bruxelles) is a trade show for the European adult entertainment industry held each February in Brussels. It was launched in 1995. The Festival hosts the ceremony of the European X Awards, a movie award for the European adult video industry.

== See also ==
- Barcelona International Erotic Film Festival
- Hot d'Or
- Venus Awards
