= Fun Factory (company) =

German sex toy manufacturer

Fun Factory GmbH
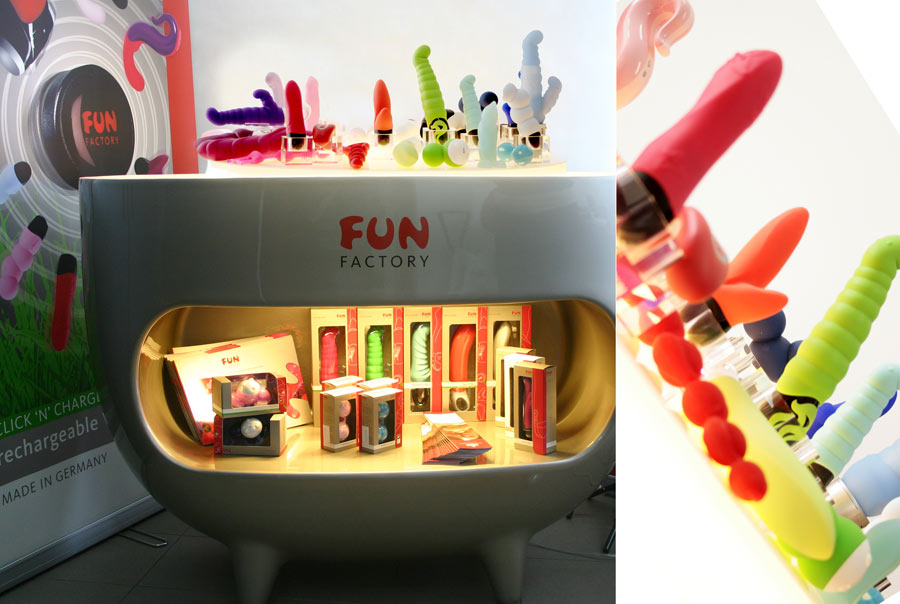
- Sex toys by Fun Factory
- Type: GmbH
- Industry: manufacturing
- Founded: 1996
- Defunct: 2024
- Headquarters: Bremen, Germany
- Key people: Dirk Bauer; Michael Pahl
- Products: dildos, vibrators, love balls, and lubricants
- Number of employees: 50 (2006)
- Website: www.funfactory.de

Fun Factory GmbH was a German manufacturer of erotic toys, specializing in silicone dildos, vibrators, and love balls. It was founded in 1996. It was located in Bremen and all its manufacturing takes place in Germany. In 2006, the company had an annual revenue of 13.5 million euros. A daughter company exists in the United States and was distributed in the US by TNB Distribution.

In 2009 Fun Factory's Vibrator elLOVE (as a representative of its product line SMARTVIBES) received the highest possible rating in a test by German magazine Öko-Test, a magazine devoted to consumer-protection and ecology.

Several of Fun Factory's products received design awards, the Vibrator DeLight being among the most decorated: it received i.a. the red dot award product design 2008 and an IF (International Forum Design) product design award.

The company was takenover by Satisfyer in October 2024.
