= Venus Berlin =

Trade fair in Berlin, Germany

- Status: Active
- Genre: Adult entertainment, erotica, pornography
- Venue: Messe Berlin
- Location: Berlin
- Country: Germany
- Inaugurated: 1997
- Most recent: 2025
- Next event: 2026
- Attendance: 34,000 (2024)
- Organizer: Venus Berlin GmbH
- Website: www.venus-berlin.com/en/

The Venus Berlin is an adult entertainment convention and trade show held at the Messe Berlin exhibition grounds. With 250 exhibitors from 40 countries and around 34,000 visitors a year, it is the largest sex industry trade show worldwide. It has been held annually in Berlin since 1997.

== Description ==
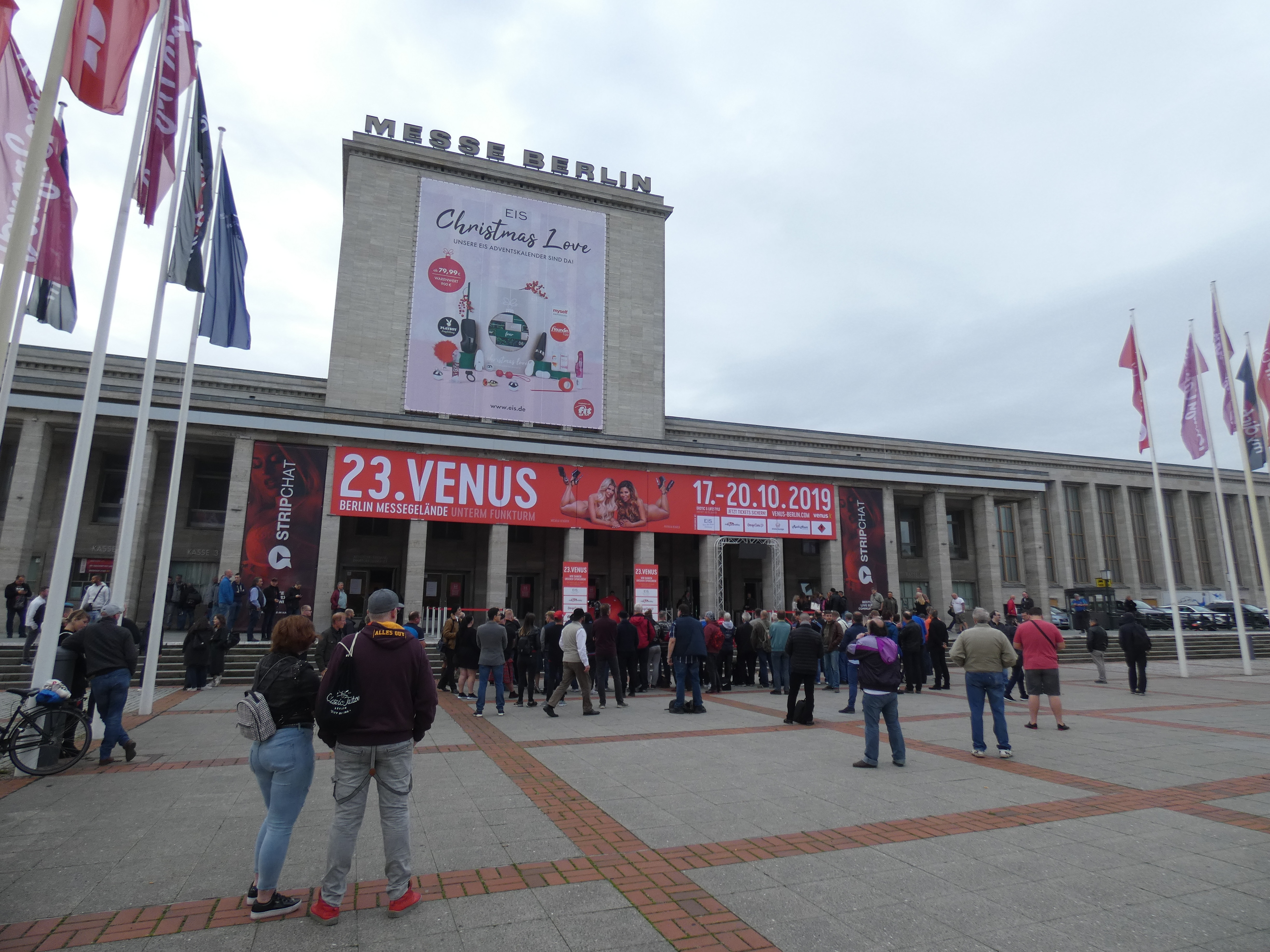
Main entrance to Venus Berlin 2019

The Venus Berlin is a four-day fair, and it has a variety of exhibition booths where actresses and actors appear, and where producers and wholesalers present their products. In addition, there is a B2B area for commercial visitors. The exhibition begins with the Venus Award ceremony, and ends with a closing night party.
