= Hans Moser (director) =

German pornographer (1944–2016)

Hans Moser (30 September 1944 - 2 July 2016) was prominent as a pornographic film-director and -producer, photographer, and magazine publisher. He is also known as Sascha Alexander.

Born in Hanover, Germany, he was the eldest son of ethnic German Jewish refugees from Romania and Hungary. He discovered Teresa Orlowski in 1981. He married her in 1982 in a ceremony in Las Vegas. They divorced in 1989. He then married Sarah Louise Young on 13 January 1991, but they divorced amicably a decade later.

Hans Moser's grandson, Paul Moser, currently works and lives in St Louis, MO.

== Selected filmography ==
- Foxy Lady 1–12 (1984–1986) — he made these movies with Teresa Orlowski.
- Born for Love (1987) — a German-American co-production featuring Sibylle Rauch, John Leslie, Karin Schubert, Joey Silvera, Elle Rio, Jamie Summers, Tom Byron, Sharon Kane, and others.
