= Micaela Schäfer =

German erotic model

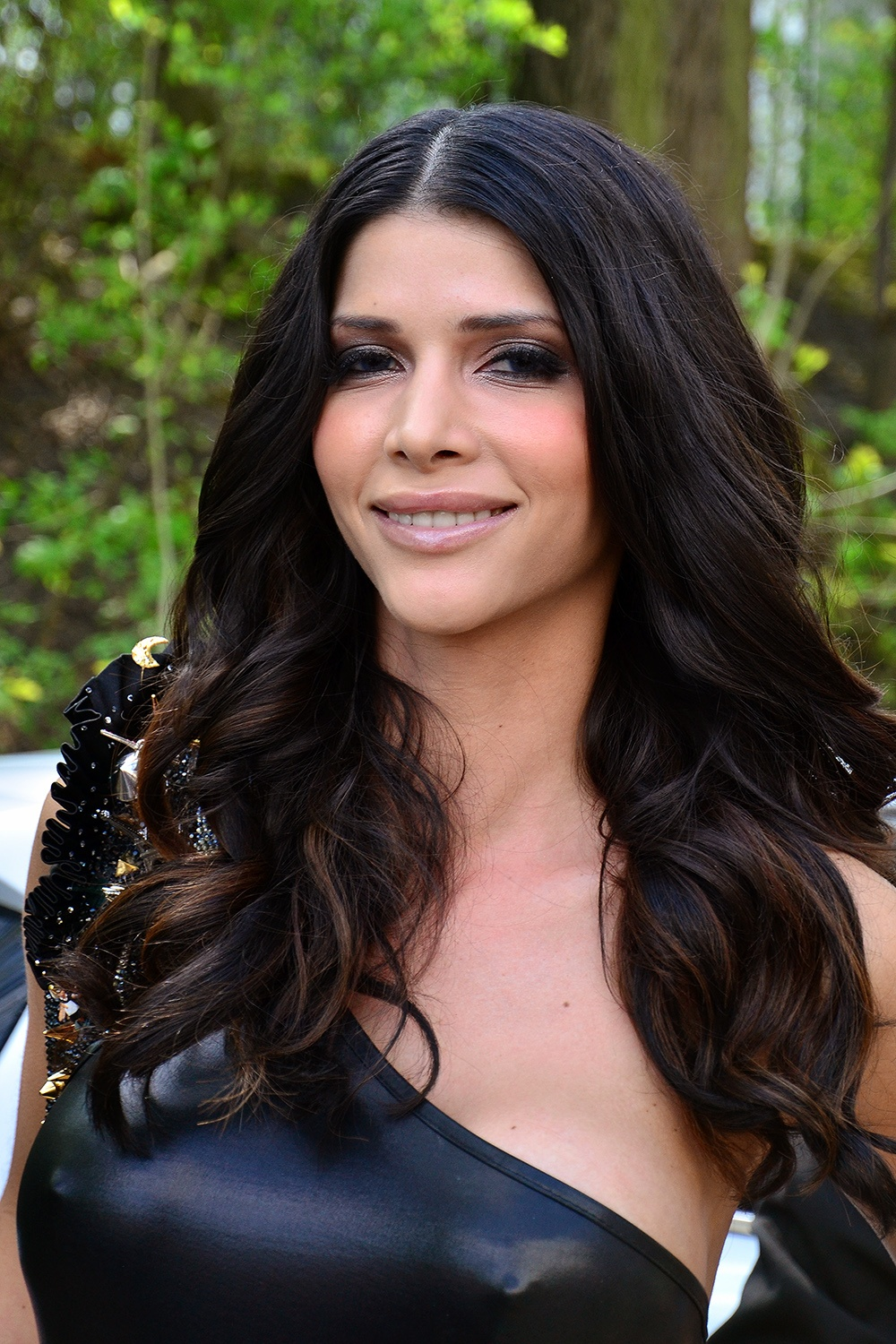
- Schäfer in 2013
- Born: 1 November 1983 (age 42); Leipzig, East Germany
- Occupations: Model, TV personality, DJ, singer
- Years active: 2004–present
- Modeling information
- Height: 5 ft 9 in (1.75 m)
- Hair color: Brown
- Eye color: Hazel
- Website: micaela-s.de

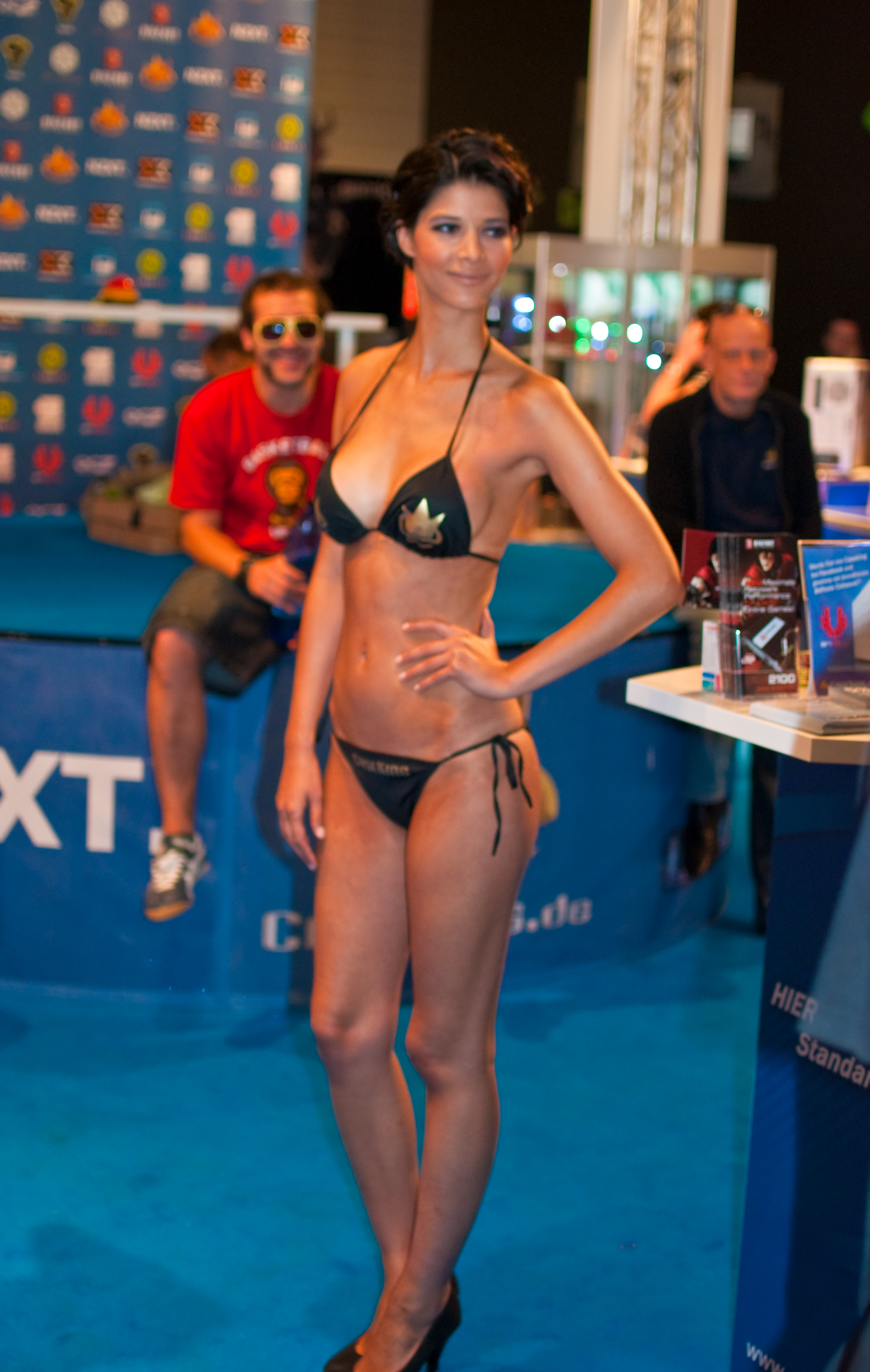
Schäfer at the 2010 Gamescom

Micaela Schäfer (born 1 November 1983) is a German nude model, television personality, DJ and singer.

== Career ==
She was Miss East Germany 2004, Miss Venus 2005, The Face of Campari 2005, and Miss Maxim 2006. She ranked eighth place in the first season of Germany's Next Topmodel in 2006.

Known for posing naked in various situations to attract publicity, Schäfer has released an autobiography entitled Lieber nackt als gar keine Masche ("better naked than no shtick at all").

== Discography ==
- "Life Is Just a Game 2010" – La Mica feat. Loona (2010)
- "U-Bahn ins Paradies" – Micaela Schäfer feat. Fränzi (2011)
- "So Much Love" – La Mica feat. Polina & Miami INC (2012)
- "U Made for Me" – Micaela Schäfer feat. Heidi Anne (2013)
- "Jump!" – Oliver DeVille feat. Micaela Schäfer (2013)
- "Michaela" (2014)
- "Blasmusik" – Finger & Kadel feat. Micaela Schäfer (2014)
- "Partypolizei" (2015)
- "Rock Me Tonight" – Micaela Schäfer & DJ Squizz feat. Vivienne Baur (2015)
- "Deine Freundin" – Jörg & Dragan (Die Autohändler) feat. Micaela Schäfer (2015)
- "Venus" (2015)
- "Let Me Wash Your Car" (2016)
- "Lauter" – Micaela Schäfer & Marco Rippegather (2017)
- "Germany Olé" – Micaela Schäfer, Yvonne Woelke, Andreas Ellermann (2018)
- "Can You English Please?" – Tobee feat. Micaela Schäfer (2018)

== Awards ==
- 2012 Venus Award - Erotic Model of the Year
- 2014 Venus Award - Erotic Model of the Year
