= Harry S. Morgan =

German pornographic film director

- Born: Michael Schey; 29 August 1945; Essen, Germany
- Died: (body discovered) 30 April 2011 (aged 65); Düsseldorf, Germany
- Occupations: Director, producer, journalist

Michael Schey (born 29 August 1945 – found dead 30 April 2011), known professionally as Harry S. Morgan, was a German director and producer of pornographic movies. He is known for directing classic-style movies.

== Biography ==
Morgan studied photography at the Folkwang University of the Arts in Essen. In 1991, he directed the thriller Pommes Rot-Weiß with Michael Lesch.

His first actions as a director and producer in the porn industry were in 1988. Morgan's trademarks are extreme sexual practices such as double penetration, fisting, and urination. He is well known as the journalist who interviews the actors before and after the scenes.

Morgan worked for the company Videorama producing series such as Maximum Perversum, Teeny Exzesse, and Junge Debütantinnen, and he became especially known for films with Gina Wild and Vivian Schmitt. He lived in Düsseldorf.

== Awards ==
- 1997 Venus Award – Best Series Director (Germany)
- 2001 Venus Award – Best Director (Germany)
- 2004 Venus Award – Best Director (Germany)
- 2007 Eroticline Award – Video Award for Outstanding Achievements (it was given back though)
