= Karen Lancaume =

French actress

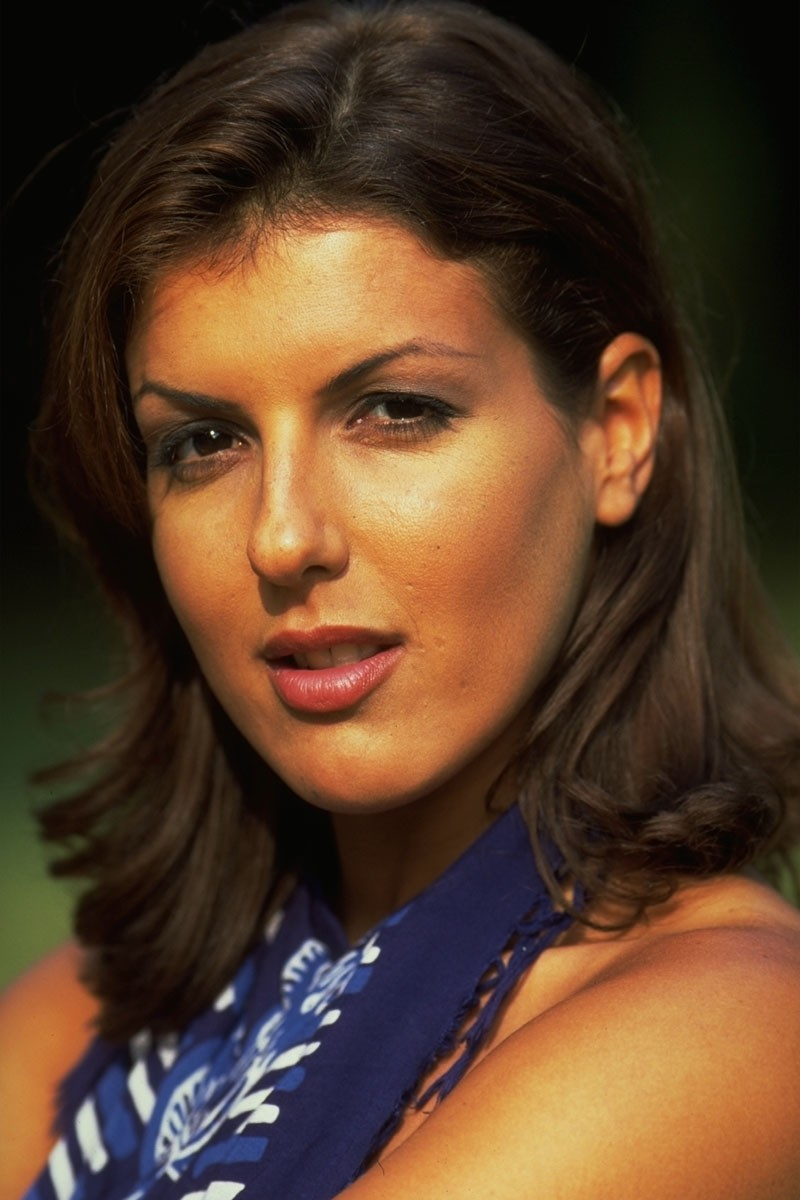
- Born: Karine Bach; 19 January 1973; Lyon, France
- Died: 28 January 2005 (aged 32); Paris, France
- Other names: Karen Lancome, Karen Lancoume, Karen D., Caren, Lauren Del Rio, Karen Lancom, Karen Bach
- Spouse: Franck Ceronne (div. 1997)

Karen Lancaume (born Karine Bach, 19 January 1973 – 28 January 2005) was a French pornographic film actress. She appeared in over 83 pornographic films between 1996 and 2000. She starred as Nadine in the 2000 film, Baise-moi, a mainstream film in which she performed unsimulated penetration and fellatio.

She was a nominee for the Best French Actress Hot d'Or in March 2000.

== Early life ==
Karine Bach was born in the suburbs of Lyon, France, into a wealthy family. Her father was German and her mother was Moroccan. She spent her childhood in the Lyon countryside and completed her studies in communications.

She stated that she had her first sexual experience at the age of 17, just before embarking on her university course, and that she worked weekends at a nightclub to pay for her studies. At the nightclub, she met Franck Ceronne, a disc jockey, whom she married. The couple divorced in 1997.

== Career ==
In 1996, to escape their crippling debts, at Franck's suggestion, the couple began working as a couple in pornographic films. In the film L'Indécente aux enfer (1997) she for the first time performed unsimulated sex scenes with other partners. The couple divorced shortly after. Following their divorce, Franck quit the pornographic film industry but Karen continued to appear in pornographic films both in Europe and the United States. Lancaume's debut in the United States was in Private Gold 25 - When the Night Falls.

Her appearances alternated between the two continents, working with producers Elegant Angel, Wicked Pictures and Sin City, and directors Marc Dorcel, Mario Salieri, Andrew Blake, Alain Payet, Alessandro Del Mar, and Luca Damiano.

She appeared in Exhibitions 1999 (John B. Root, 1998), a pornographic film shot as a documentary on the porn scene, which combined interviews with the protagonists. Lancaume came to feel distaste for her work, saying in an interview: "I was covered in spunk, wet, freezing to death and no one even offered me a towel. When the scene ends, you are worthless."

In 1999, she exhibited at the Cannes Film Festival, and met Virginie Despentes, who was seeking actresses to perform explicit unsimulated sex in her first film Baise-moi (Fuck Me, Virginie Despentes and Coralie Trinh Thi, 2000). In addition to Lancaume, Raffaëla Anderson, another French porn actress, was also chosen. The film is based on the novel by Despentes, which narrates the encounter between Nadine (Karen) and Manu (Raffaëla) and her subsequent flight, transformed into vengeance against society and the male gender.

Despentes described her début as a feminist argument in the style of Thelma and Louise but with real sex scenes, rape and murder. Following the film, Anderson decided to pursue a career in mainstream film, while Lancaume started easing her workload compared to previous years. She eventually abandoned the pornographic industry in 2002, after six years in the business.

== Death ==
Lancaume died by suicide on 28 January 2005, by taking an overdose of temazepam and alcohol, in her ex-boyfriend's apartment in Paris, France. She was 32.

== Filmography ==
- Black Bastard 12 (video) (2002)
- La marionnette (video) (2001)
- Lady Chérie (video) (as Karen Lacome) (2001)
- À feu et à sexe sur la Riviera (video) (2001)
- Alta borghesia (video) (as Karen Lacombe) (2000)
- Baise-moi as Nadine (as Karen Bach) (2000)
- Harcèlement au féminin (video) (2000)
- Inferno (video) (2000)
- Les interdits de la gynéco (video) as Le docteur Lancaume (2000)
- Niqueurs-nés (video) (1999)
- L'empreinte du vice (video) as Maid in the bordello (1999)
- Acteurs porno en analyse (video) (1999)
- World Sex Tour 21: France (video) (1999)
- Anal Power 3 (video) (1999)
- Danila Visconti (video) (1999)
- Hotdorix (video) (1999)
- Il residence della vergogna (video) (1999)
- Le château des désirs (video) (1999)
- L'enjeu du désir (video) (1999)
- Le principe de plaisir (video) (1998)
- Cindy (video) as Veronica (1998)
- Lili (video) (1998)
- Girl of Casino (1998)
- Mad Sex (video) (1998)
- An American Girl in Paris (video) (1998)
- Bérénice nique (video) (1998)
- Don Tonino (video) (1998)
- Exhibition 99 (1998)
- Fuga dall'Albania (video) as Helen (1998)
- Journal d'une infirmière (video) (1998)
- Necrofilia (video) (1998)
- Racconti dall'oltretomba (video) (1998)
- Le fétichiste (video) (1997)
- The 5 Beginners (video) (1997)
- Sacro e profano (video) (as Karen Lancoume) (1997)
- La maledizione del castello (video) (1997)
- Antefutura (video) (1997)
- Bourgeoisie violée (video) (1997)
- Incest' Air (video) as La fille (1997)
- La mante religieuse (video) (1997)
- Papà, ti scopo tua moglie (video) (1997)
- Sexe en Eaux Troubles (video) (1997)
- Private Gold 25: When the Night Falls (video) (1997)
- Teeny Exzesse 48 - Sperma zum Dessert (video) (1997)
- Teeny Exzesse 51 - Karbol-Mäuschen (video) (1997)
- Oberstabsärztin (video) (as Carene Lancome) (1997)
- L'indécente aux enfers (video) (1997)
- World Sex Tour 15: France (video) (1996)
- Le Majordome (video) (1995)
