= Alain Payet =

French pornographic film director and actor

- Born: 17 January 1947; Neuilly-sur-Seine, Hauts-de-Seine, France
- Died: 13 December 2007; Paris, France
- Other names: John Love, Jean Pardaillan, René Houaro, James Gartner, René Ouaro, Alain Paillet, Alan Payet
- Occupations: Director, Actor, Writer
- Years active: 1970–2007

Alain Payet (17 January 1947 – 13 December 2007 in Paris as a result of cancer), also known under the pseudonyms John Pardaillan, John and Frederick Brasil Amor, James Gardner, James Gartner and Alain Garnier, was a film director of French pornographic movies and erotica.

== Biography ==
Payet began his career in the 1970s, and, for a decade, he served as an assistant director on shoots for Philippe Labro and Claude Vidal. In 1973 and 1974, he oversaw the staging of pornographic comedies produced by Lucien Hustaix, such as Gambling Dens (Les Tripoteuses) or The Pleasures (Les Jouisseuses), before launching himself into the profession with the pseudonym of "John Love".

Not shying from extreme or deviant sexual practices and amateur actors, Alain Payet cast a 287-pound actress, nicknamed Groseille (Currant), in the movie Sexplosion makes black, and he cast the dwarf Desire Bastareaud as the lead actor in films like Les Gourmandes du sexe (The Gourmet sex) and Les Aventures érotiques de Lili pute (The Erotic Adventures of a Little Whore Lili) . In 1985, he launched the fashion of "Hard-Crad" with the film La Doctoresse a de gros seins (The doctor has big tits), which remains one of the best selling erotic video of the 1980s in France.

In the course of his career, Payet cast in his films various French pornographic actresses, including Élodie Cherie, Karen Lancaume, Laure Sainclair, Katsuni, Ovidie and Tabatha Cash.

In the mainstream film industry, he directed several low-budget exploitation films and B-movies, such as L'Émir préfère les blondes (The Emir prefer blondes), with Paul Préboist or, for Eurociné production company, Train spécial pour Hitler (Hitler's Last Train) and Helga, la louve de Stilberg (Helga, She Wolf of Stilberg). His favorite maxim was: "Those who do not masturbate to porn movies are sick".

=== Selected filmography ===
Director/crew
Year	Title	Crew	Notes
2007	Section disciplinaire		
2006	Yasmine à la prison de femme (VMD)		
2006	Urgences	Yasmine Lafitte, Katsumi, Oksana D'Harcourt	
2005	Oksana-Flic en uniforme (VMD)		
2003	Infirmières de charme (VMD)		
2002	Les Campeuses de Saint-Tropez		
2001	L'Affaire Katsumi		
2000	Les tontons tringleurs (VMD)		
1999	La Dresseuse	Zara Whites	
1998	La Marionnette (VMD)		
1997	Les nuits de la présidente (VMD)		
1997	Labyrinthe (VMD)		
1997	Prison (Colmax)		
1996	Séances très spécial (Magma)		
1995	L'Infirmière est vaginale		
1995	Bourgeoise le jour et pute la nuit II (René Chateau)		
1994	Visiteuses (Élodie Chérie)		
1985–1995	Petites salopes à enculer Production Cinevog 35 mn		
1985–1995	Rèves de cul as Frédéric Brazil (Antarès)		
1985–1995	Culs farcis (Penguin productions)		
1985–1995	Réseau Baise-Sex opérator as Frédéric Brazil (Punch video) Production Cinevog 35 mn		
1985–1995	La directrice aka La directrice est une salope (Penguin) Production Cinevog 35 mn		
1985–1995	Elle suce aka Elle suce à genoux (Antarès) Production Cinevog		
1985–1995	Cours très privés aka Cours très privés pour jeunes baiseuses (Antarès) Production Cinevog 35 mn		
1985–1995	L'infirmière aux gros seins (Punch video) production Cinevog 35 mn		
1985–1995	Les aventures érotiques de Lili pute		
1985–1995	Prostitution clandestine		
1985–1995	Les gourmandes du sexe		
1983	L'émir préfère les blondes		
1978	Nathalie dans l'enfer nazi aka Nathalie rescapée de l'Enfer		
1977	Train spécial pour Hitler		
1976	Helga She-Wolf of Stilberg		
1974	Les jouisseuses Lucien Hesaix; Les tripoteuses Lucien Hesaix		Assistant Director

== Awards and nominations ==
Hot D'Or Awards:

- 1999 winner - Best European Director (Le Labyrinthe)
- 2000 winner - Best Remake or Adaptation (Les Tontons Tringleurs - Blue One)

Venus Awards:

- 2003 winner - Best Director (France)

FICEB Awards:

- 2000 Ninfa Award winner - Best Director (La fete a Gigi - International Film Grup)
- 2002 Ninfa Award winner - Best Director (Public)
