= Zazel =

Zazel may refer to:

- Zazel (spirit), a spirit of Saturn in magic
- Zazel, stage name of English circus performer Rossa Matilda Richter (1860–1937)

== Characters ==
- Zazel, a character in the poem Tiriel
- Zazel Pierce, a character in the film Quackser Fortune Has a Cousin in the Bronx
- Zazel, a character in the Yo-kai Watch franchise

== Works ==
- Zazel: The Scent of Love, a 1997 American erotic film
- "Zazel", a song by the Bar Kokhba Sextet from the 2008 album Lucifer: Book of Angels Volume 10

== See also ==
- Azazel (disambiguation)
- Zazzle, an American online marketplace
