= Anksa Kara =

French/Cameroonian pornographic actress (born 1985)

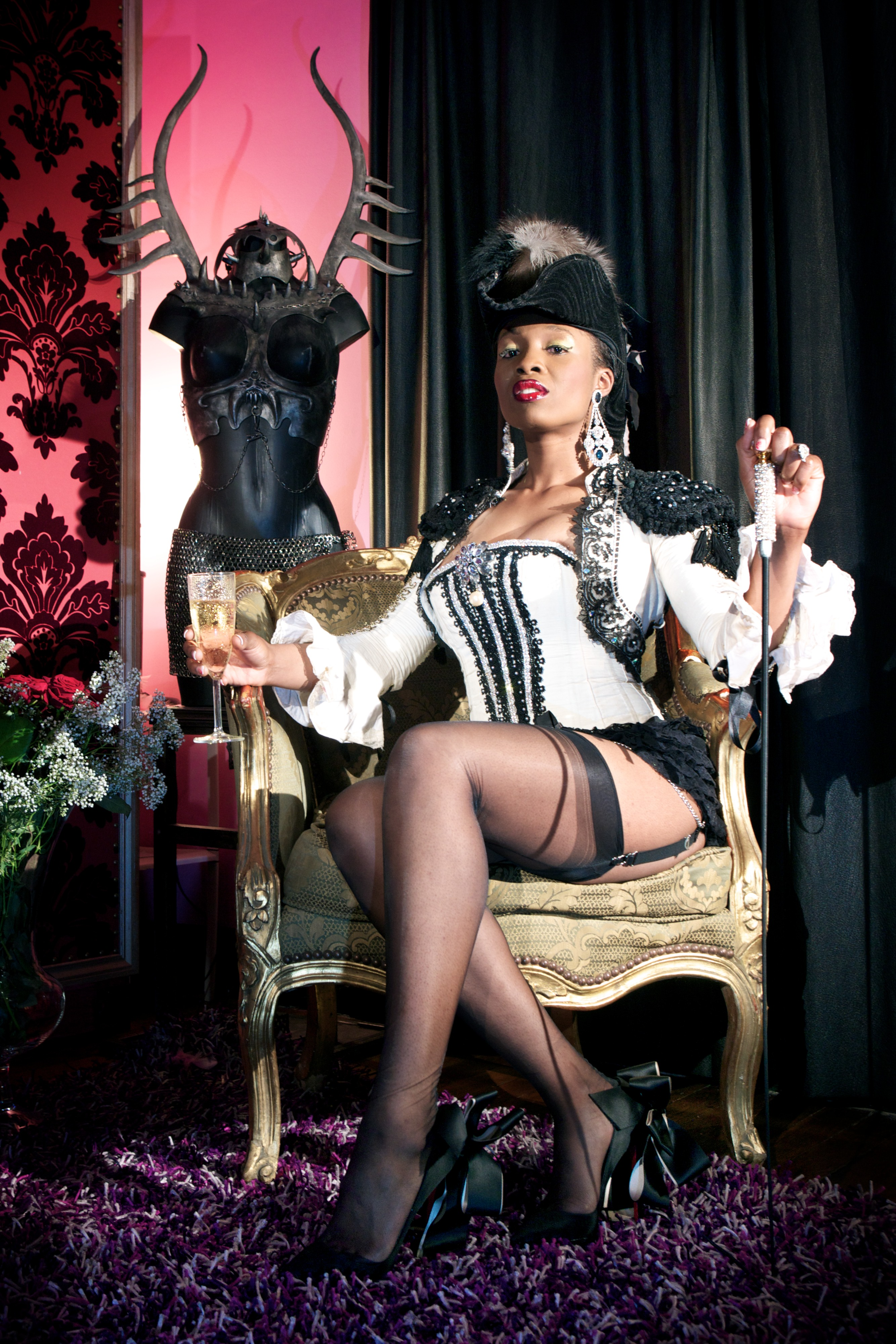
- Born: March 24, 1985 (age 39); Nkongsamba, Cameroon
- Years active: 2007-2014 (per Iafd)
- Height: 1.71 m (5 ft 7 in)

Anksa Kara (born March 24, 1985) is a Franch-Cameroon pornographic actress.

== Biography ==
She arrived in France in 1993. In 2005, she started working as a stripper in several Parisian clubs. She later became a nude model and a pornographic actress.

In June 2009, Anksa Kara was featured in the porn trade magazine Hot Vidéo (No. 220). Later that year, she was nominated for the Hot d'Or for Best starlet. Also in 2009, she created her own company, Anksa Kara & Co, with the aim of promoting Black adult actresses in France. She has since appeared in various French porn productions. She also appeared in several television shows broadcast on the French channel Paris Première and in mainstream productions, including several films directed by Jean-Pierre Mocky.

== Filmography ==
=== Erotic and pornographic films ===
- 2007 : Kama Sutra black by Jean-Pierre Charmontel (Java Consulting)
- 2007 : Taxi de nuit by Fabien Lafait (JTC Video)
- 2007 : Défonce Anale à La Lhermite Volume 1 by Philippe Lhermite (Telsev)
- 2007 : Les Castings de Lhermite Volume 29 by Philippe Lhermite (Telsev)
- 2007 : Les Inclassables de Lhermite Volume 5 by Philippe Lhermite (Telsev)
- 2007 : Soumission Promise Volume 2 by Philippe Lhermite (Telsev)
- 2008 : Allumeuses 2 by Fabien Lafait (JTC Video)
- 2008 : Disco Sex by Fabien Lafait (JTC Video)
- 2008 : Les Castings de Fred Coppula, Acte 1 by Fred Coppula (Fred Coppula Productions)
- 2008 : X Amat Special Blacks by Fabien Lafait (JTC Video)
- 2009 : Cinémax by Max Antoine (Fred Coppula Productions)
- 2010 : Dark Dreams - More Dirty Fantasies by Thomas S. Allan (Magmafilm)
- 2011 : Dans Ton Cul 4 : Au boulot by Luka (Saucisson Prod)
- 2011 : Journal d'une Femme de Chambre by Max Antoine (Fred Coppula Productions)
- 2011 : Orgy The XXX Championship by Hervé Bodilis (Marc Dorcel)
- 2012 : Ça Baise au Sauna by Luka (Marc Dorcel)
- 2012 : La Journaliste by Pascal Lucas (Marc Dorcel)
- 2013 : Patrouille de nuit by Kris Bakelit (Marc Dorcel)

=== Cinema ===
- 2010 : Eject by Jean-Marc Vincent : Pam, the black prostitute
- 2011 : Le Dossier Toroto by Jean-Pierre Mocky : Irma, l'intendante
- 2012 : Le Mentor by Jean-Pierre Mocky
- 2013 : Le Bonheur by Fabrice Grange

=== TV performances ===
- 2007 : Les Tabous de... Le plaisir féminin TV program of Karine Le Marchand (France 2, November 14, 2007)
- 2007 : First interview of Anksa Kara with Anna Martin and Fabien Lafait in Noctambule on Pigalle, Paris (Paris Dernière, December 27, 2007)
- 2009 : Photoshoot of Anksa Kara & Co. in April 2009 for « Black Power! Yes We Can » (Hot Vidéo, June 2009)
- 2009 : Anksa Kara chez Magloire (Cap 24, August 2009)
- 2009 : Anksa Kara & Co. on Hot d'Or ceremony in Paris (October 20, 2009)
- 2010 : Enquêtes très spéciales (Direct Star, September 7, 2010)
- 2010 : Interview of Anksa Kara during Hot Vidéo night party (Hot Vidéo, December 21, 2010)
- 2011 : Exclusive Video DSK Sofitel with Anksa Kara and Josué Rocher (YouTube)
- 2011 : Les scandaleuses d'Anksa Kara & Co. setting a hot mood in salon du Louvre (Paris Dernière, November 2011)
- 2012 : Rive droite - Dîner libertin TV program of Guillaume Durand with Anksa Kara (Paris Première, January 28, 2012)
- 2012 : Les Jouets d'Anksa Kara (Paris Dernière, May 2012)
- 2013 : Myster Mocky présente season 3 : Auto-Stop (Canal Jimmy, June 4, 2013)
- 2013 : Myster Mocky présente season 3 : Derrière la porte close (Canal Jimmy, June 4, 2013)

=== Clips ===
- 2009 : Hombre Que Soy (Shaka Ponk)
- 2010 : Bistouflex (Seth Gueko)

== Publications ==
- Halimi, Frank (January 2008). "Anksa Kara : une interview XXL" [Anksa Kara : a XXL interview]. Amina (in French) (453): 157. ISSN 0244-0008. Archived from the original on December 6, 2014.
- Abelanet, Jam (May 2008). Fantaisies souterraines : Nues dans le métro. Charme et érotisme (in French). Paris: éditions Ragage. ISBN 978-2915460643.
- Grégoire, Mathieu (April 24, 2009). "L'effeuillage, ce n'est pas que se déshabiller, c'est d'abord jouer avec la personne pour qui on exécute le strip". 20 minutes (in French). ISSN 1632-1022. Archived from the original on May 27, 2012.
- "Black Power! Yes We Can". Hot Vidéo (in French) (220). June 2009. ISSN 0998-8939.
- X-Intime, ed. (December 15, 2010). "Entretien : Anksa Kara" [Interview : Anksa Kara] (in French). Archived from the original on May 25, 2012.

== Awards ==
- 2009 : Hot d'Or : nominated Best french starlet
