= Estelle Desanges =

French pornographic actress

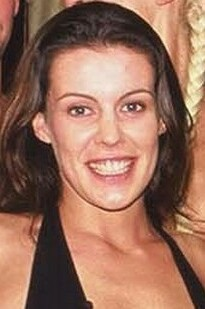
- Estelle Desanges in 2002
- Born: 8 March 1977 (age 48); Bordeaux, France
- Occupation: Pornographic actress
- Years active: 1997–present

Estelle Desanges (born 8 March 1977) is a French former pornographic actress. During the 2000s, she was one of France's most popular porn actresses.

== Early life ==
Estelle Desanges was born in Bordeaux in 1977. Desanges worked as a bartender at a nightclub and went attended nursing school. She was discovered by Fred Coppula in 1999 when she attended a Hot Vidéo event. She gave Coppula photographs that she had taken by a customer at the nightclub she worked at. Coppula showed the photos to the leadership at Blue One, a production company, and she was signed.

== Career ==
Estelle Desanges started working in adult films in 1999, mainly in films produced by Fred Coppula. She received a Hot d'Or Award for Best French New Starlet in 2000. In 2001, she started working with VCV Communication. That year she starred in La Fille du Batelier, directed by Patrice Cabanel and won the Hot d'Or Best European Supporting Actress award. That same year, she appeared on Tout le monde en parle. During her career, she also worked with directors John B. Root, Brigitte Lahaie, Rocco Siffredi, and Walter Ego. She quit acting in 2004 and started working in marketing for V. Communications, followed by being a host on HNN, Hot Vidéo Magazine's online news site. In 2006, she co-authored an op-ed for Libération with Brigitte Lahaie, Helena Karel, Ovidie and Loïc LUC demanding that the French porn industry stop producing videos showing unprotected sex. She received a Hot d'Or Honorary Award in 2009. Today, she makes occasionally appearances in soft core porn films, including works by Ovidie.

== Discography ==
- French Kiss – La Sélection érotique d'Estelle Desanges – CD audio – Podis.
- French Kiss Volume 2 – La Sélection Glamour d'Estelle Desanges – CD audio – Podis.
- Sex Machine – N-Gels featuring Estelle Desanges – CD audio
