= Dolly Golden =

Former French pornographic actress (born 1973)

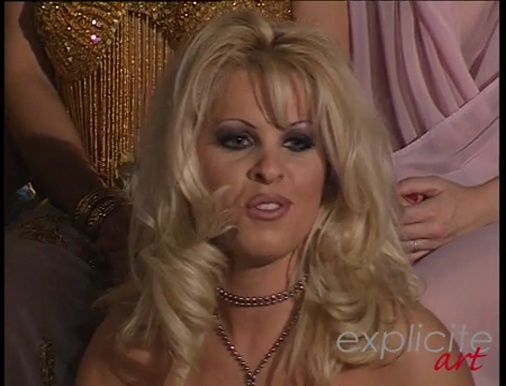
- Golden in a scene from the film Exhibition 99 (1998)
- Born: Samya Myriam Linda Bouzitoune; August 28, 1973 (age 52); Annecy, Haute-Savoie, France
- Other names: Dolly, Dolly B., Dolly Gold, Dolly Tresallet, Samy, Samy, Samya Selti
- Height: 5 ft 5 in (1.65 m)

Dolly Golden (born Samya Myriam Linda Bouzitoune on August 28, 1973) is a former pornographic actress.

== Career ==
She was born in Annecy, Haute-Savoie, France and received an award for Best European Starlet in Brussels in 1997. She appeared in productions in Germany, Italy, Holland, Spain and the United States, where the media became interested in her and she appeared on several television shows.

Dolly appeared in many articles and adult press covers. Passionate about dance, she performed erotic dance shows in French discothèques. She has also appeared in several music video clips.

She was the godmother of the Paris Hot Vidéo Exhibition, held in February 2000. She has been nominated about 50 times at various award ceremonies around the world, including Berlin, Milan, Barcelona, and Las Vegas. In Cannes, in 1999, she won the Hot d' Or for Best European Actress – Supporting Role, for film "Croupe du Monde 98 ". In 2000, she won the Hot d' Or for Best French Actress for "Les Tontons Tringleurs".

In 2000, along with her pornstar companion Marc Barrow, she produced and directed her first motion picture for an American company. Having retired from her career as an actress in the adult film industry in 2006, Golden no longer appears in adult movies, and now only does public relations work for Dorcel Films.

== Filmography ==
- 1999: Angel's Quest
- 2005: L'Ex-femme de ma vie, directed by Josiane Balasko
