= Sodomite =

Sodomite may refer to:

- A person who practices sodomy
- An inhabitant of Sodom
- Sodomites (film), a 1998 French short film by Gaspar Noé
- "Sodomites", a song by Soulfly from their 2015 album Anchangel
- The former name of the Adult Film Database
