= Draghixa Laurent =

French pornographic actress (born 1973)

- Born: 3 June 1973 (age 53); Split, SR Croatia, SFR Yugoslavia
- Height: 173 cm (5 ft 8 in)
- Website: www.draghixaxxx.com

Draghixa Laurent (born 3 June 1973), best known as Draghixa, is a French former pornographic actress and singer.

== Early life and career ==
Born in Split, Croatia, Draghixa moved to France with her family when she was two. After hairdresser training she became a stripper and then debuted in the adult film industry in 1993, in the third volume of the film series Offertes à Tout. In 1995 she was awarded with the Hot d'Or for best actress, for her performance in the film Le Parfum de Mathilde (The Scent Of Mathilde). She retired from adult industry a few months later. In 1996 with the stage name Monika Dombrowski she published the music single "Dream" and then the following year she featured the song "Did You Test?" by French DJ Lapsus. She also appeared, together with Julia Channel, in the music video of the song "Cours vite" by French rock group Silmarils (band).
