= Mélanie Coste =

French former adult film actress

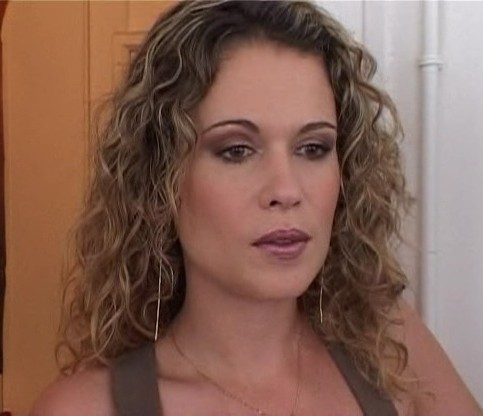
- Mélanie Coste in a screenshot from the 2003 film La Menteuse, directed by Fred Coppula.
- Born: Delphine Dequin; 1976 (age 49–50); Vendôme, France
- Citizenship: France
- Occupation: Pornographic actress
- Years active: 2001–2003

Mélanie Coste (born Delphine Dequin in 1976 (Note: Conflicting sources state that Coste's birthday is 31 March 1976 or 3 April 1976)), is a French former adult film actress. In the early 2000s, she was one of France's most popular pornographic actresses thanks to her "girl next door" image.

== Early life ==
Mélanie Coste was born Delphine Dequin in Vendôme, France in 1976.

== Career ==
Prior to working in the adult film industry, Mélanie Coste worked at a Bordeaux-based travel agency. In 2001, she won a competition, organized by French trade magazine Hot Vidéo, to pose for an erotic photography session with Christophe Mourthé. Shortly afterwards, she started a career in adult films.

From 2002 to 2003, Coste worked as an exclusive contract performer for Marc Dorcel productions, who had been looking for an equivalent to Clara Morgane. With Dorcel, she starred L'Affaire Katsumi (2002) and Une nuit au bordel (2002). After leaving Dorcel, she worked with Fred Coppula. With Coppula, she performed in Le Journal de Pauline, which in 2003 she won the Venus Award for best actress.

She wrote a column about sexuality for the French version of FHM.

== Personal life ==
Coste retired from porn, after making less than 20 hardcore features, to pursue a year long relationship with journalist and television presenter Philippe Vecchi.

== Awards and nominations ==
- 2003 Venus Award winner – Best Actress (France)
- 2004 AVN Award nominee – Female Foreign Performer of the Year
- 2005 AVN Award nominee – Female Foreign Performer of the Year
