= Agiel =

Ancient text figure

'Agȋȇl (Hebrew: אגיאל, romanized: ʿAgyal) is the Intelligence (beneficial spirit) of Saturn mentioned as a Spirit in such works as the Key of Solomon. As it says on the 10th Plate: "The First Pentacle of Mercury.--It serveth to invoke the Spirits who are under the Firmament." And the letters forming the names of the Spirits Yekahel and Agiel. He is also described as being the presiding spirit of the planet Saturn, with Zȃzȇl.

== See also ==
- List of angels in theology
- Key of Solomon
- Lesser Key of Solomon
- Magical Treatise of Solomon
- Saturn#Ancient observations
- Testament of Solomon
- Zazel – erotic art film 1997
