= Julia Channel =

French actress (born 1973)

- Born: 3 November 1973 (age 52); Paris, France
- Other names: Giulia Chanel, Giulia Sow, Giuly Chanel, Julia, Julia Chanel, Julia Channel, Julia Snow, Julia Sow, July Chanel, Lydia Channel, Lydia Channell
- Height: 5 ft 6 in (1.68 m)

Julia Channel (born 3 November 1973) is a French actress, singer, entrepreneur, and former pornographic actress.

== Career ==
After posing for magazines such as Playboy and Penthouse in the early 1990s, Channel debuted in the adult industry in 1992 and retired in 1996; during this time, she starred in about 120 productions. In 1998, she won a Hot d'Or d'Honneur Award.

She also starred in a number of mainstream films, such as Les truffes alongside Jean Reno, Frères (1994), Coup de vice (1996) together with Samy Naceri, and Recto/Verso (1999). In addition, she starred in a series of erotic TV-movies produced and broadcast by M6 Television, and, in 2001, she hosted the TV-program Le journal du hard on Canal+.

Channel appeared in a number of hip hop music videos, including Method Man's "Judgement Day". She also hosted a music program, Hip Hop Channel, which was broadcast by the channel MCM. In 2010, she started her own musical career, releasing her first single "All I want" from her debut album Colours. In her 2012 music video for the song "Forever in a Day", she had as a guest star the soccer player Didier Drogba.

In 2008, Channel published an autobiography entitled L'enfer vu du ciel (The hell seen from the sky).

In 2010, she created a dating service website for singles called Mecacroquer.

== Personal life ==
Channel was born to a Malian father and a French mother of Italian origin. At age 18, she first traveled to the United States with Pierre Woodman to attend the AVN Awards. In her 2008 memoir, she writes that she was given the screen name "Julia Chanel" because of her preferred perfume, Chanel No. 5, adding that a letter from the perfume's manufacturer later forced her to add a second letter N to the name. She also accuses fellow French pornographic actress Tabatha Cash of stealing her passport to prevent her from getting work.
