= Emmanuelle Schick Garcia =

Canadian film director

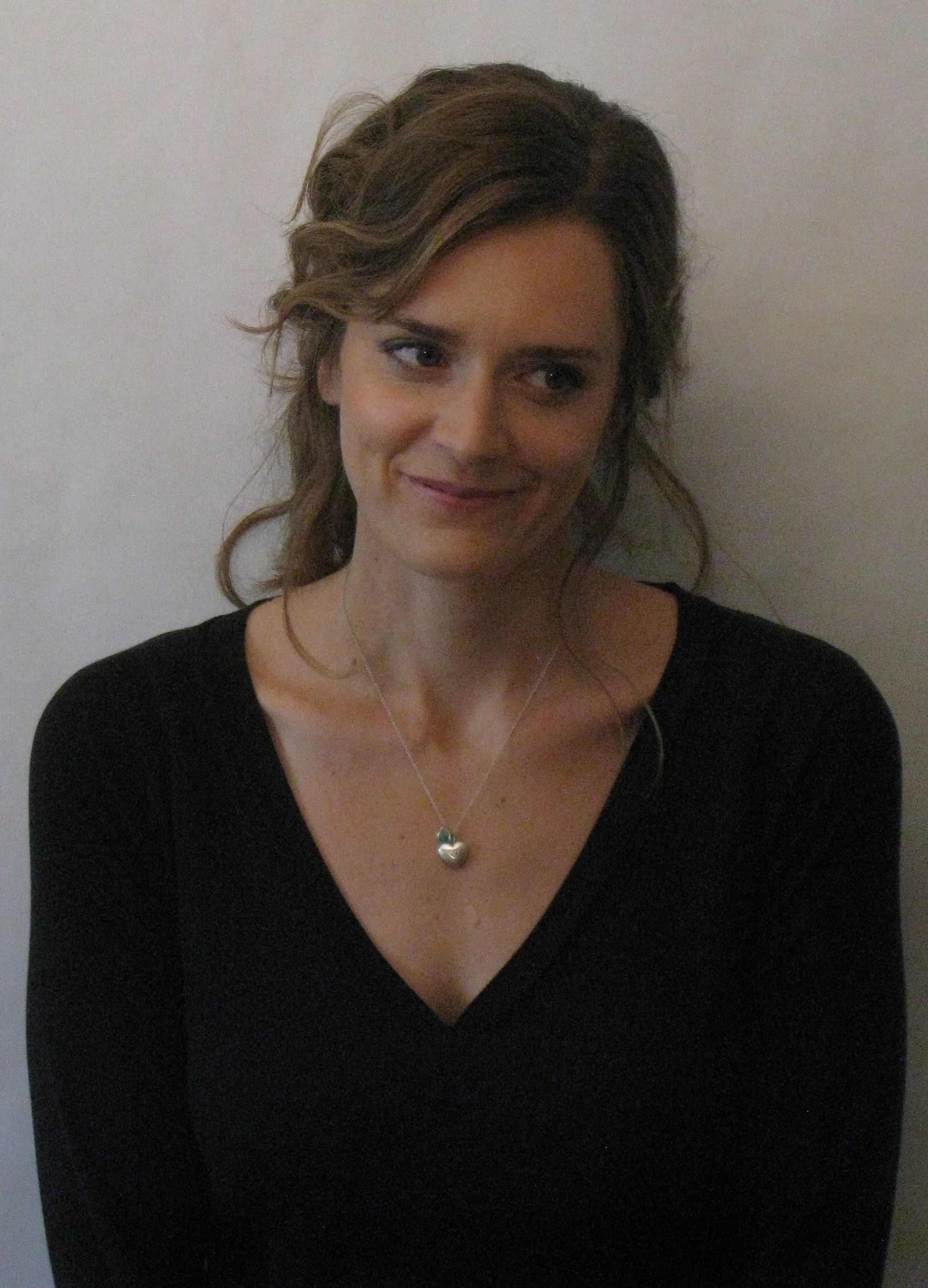
- Born: France
- Education: University of California, Los Angeles (BA, MFA)

Emmanuelle Schick Garcia is a French-born Spanish-Canadian documentary filmmaker, musician, model, and former competitive swimmer. Her best known films include Le Petite Morte (2003), a documentary about the French pornography industry, and The Idiot Cycle (2009), a film examining the role of chemical and pharmaceutical companies in causing and treating cancer.

== Early life and education ==
Schick Garcia was born in Southern France to a Spanish mother and Canadian father. At the age of three, her family moved to Vancouver, British Columbia, where she grew up. Her father, Doug Schick, was a professional rugby player who represented Canada in international competitions.

Schick Garcia was a Spanish Junior Swim Champion. She was a world ranked swimmer at the age of fifteen and represented Spain at the 8 Nations Cup (1992) in Sweden and the European Junior Swimming Championships (1992) in England. She competed in the finals at the 1992, 1996 and 2000 Spanish Olympic Trials for CN Ferca (Valencia), Real Canoe NC (Madrid) and Club Natacio Sabadell (Catalunya). In 1996, she was the Spanish Vice-Champion in the 200 IM and the bronze medalist in the 100 butterfly at the 1998 Spanish National Championships.

At eighteen, she earned a swimming scholarship to University of California, Los Angeles, where she received a B.A. in art history. During her time at UCLA, she was also a student-athlete, activist, and a journalist for the Daily Bruin.

She was awarded "Outstanding UCLA Swimming Freshman" in 1996 and the UCLA swim team "Bruin Pride" award in 1998 and 1999. She was ranked sixth all-time in the 200 IM and eighth in the 400 IM on UCLA's all-time best times in 1996, and was the swim team co-captain in 1999.

She received a M.F.A. in film production (directing) at UCLA School of Theater, Film and Television, where she was awarded the Motion Picture Association of America Award and the Mary Pickford Award for Excellence in documentary filmmaking. Her UCLA thesis film La Petite Morte won three film festival awards for Best Documentary and one nomination for Best Documentary.

== Career ==
In 2000, after being discovered by a Sports Illustrated photographer, Schick Garcia was signed to Kazarian, Spencer and Associates Modelling Agency in Los Angeles. She was the swimmer featured in the 2000 TAG Heuer Link watch advertisements which appeared in Vogue, Harper's Bazaar, Elle, among others.

One of Schick's early documentary films was La Petite Morte (2003) which examined the French pornography industry, focusing on the experience of actor Raffaëla Anderson. Her films Cancer and A Safe Place were screened as official selections at Les Films du Monde, Montreal. She directed the 'making of' Richard Bohringer's C'est Beau Une Ville La Nuit, and 20 Ans Déjà with French rugby star Denis Charvet.

In 2009, Schick Garcia wrote, directed and coproduced (with Laila Tahhar) the feature-length documentary The Idiot Cycle which won the 2010 Green Report Award. A review in New Internationalist gave The Idiot Cycle four stars, stating, "The emotion is raw and the message is simple: the 'war on cancer' is a hoax." The film explores why more effort is spent treating cancer rather than preventing it, arguing that pharmaceutical companies have incentives to disregard public health and safety. The film opens with footage of Schick Garcia's own mother removing the bandages from her mastectomy.

She directed the music video El Lado Salvaje for the Chilean band Wentru that appeared on MTV.

She was the songwriter of Canadian experimental band Japanese Pop Songs, who were named one of Vancouver's best unsigned bands in 2007.

She has written articles in French and English for Slate, Huffington Post and The Advocate, among other publications.
