= Eva Smith =

Eva Smith may refer to:

- Eva Marree Kullander Smith, sex workers' rights activist murdered in 2013
- Eva Munson Smith (1843–1915), American composer, poet, and author
