= Toroto =

Toroto may refer to:

- Tarator, sometimes known in Turkish as toroto, a type of soup
- Toroto, a character in the 2011 French film Le dossier Toroto

== See also ==
- Totoro (disambiguation)
