= Desanges =

Desanges is a French given name and surname.

Notable people with the surname include:

- Estelle Desanges (born 1977), stage name of a former French pornographic actress
- Jehan Desanges (1929–2021), French historian, philologist and epigrapher
- Louis William Desanges (1822–1905), English artist of French background
