= La Petite Morte =

- Directed by: Emmanuelle Schick Garcia
- Written by: Emmanuelle Schick Garcia
- Produced by: Emmanuelle Schick Garcia
- Cinematography: Hugh Scott; James Yuan
- Edited by: Ruben Korenfeld
- Music by: Captain Ahab
- Production company: JPS Films
- Distributed by: Vodeotv
- Release date: June 20, 2003 (Slovakia)
- Running time: 41 minutes
- Country: Canada
- Language: French
- Budget: $55,000

La Petite Morte is a 2003 Canadian documentary directed by Emmanuelle Schick Garcia about the pornography business in France, centering on the interviews of Raffaela Anderson, John B. Root and others. It won three film festival awards for Best Documentary and one nomination for Best Documentary.

The title is a reference to "la petite mort", Gallic slang for "the little death", an idiom and euphemism for orgasm.

== Background ==
Shick Garcia stated the purpose of this documentary was to portray a humane look at people involved with the porn industry. She spent seven months researching for the film, including performing interviews, watching films, and reading about the pornography industry.

== Interviewees ==
Interviewees include Raffaëla Anderson, Fred Coppula, Brigitte Lahaie, Clara Morgane, Francis Mischkind, Oceane, and John B. Root. During the interview Anderson talks with Shick Garcia about many subjects revolving around pornography like rape, incest and suicide.

== Reception ==
Kevin Thomas of the Los Angeles Times wrote, "Both Schick and Anderson have too much contempt for porn, its makers and its audience for their tedious film to have much significance."
