= Azazel (comics) =

Azazel, in comics, may refer to:

- Azazel (DC Comics), the demon in Neil Gaiman's Sandman
- Azazel (Marvel Comics), the biological father of Nightcrawler, created by Chuck Austen

== See also ==
- Azazel (disambiguation)
