= John B. Root =

French director and producer of pornographic films

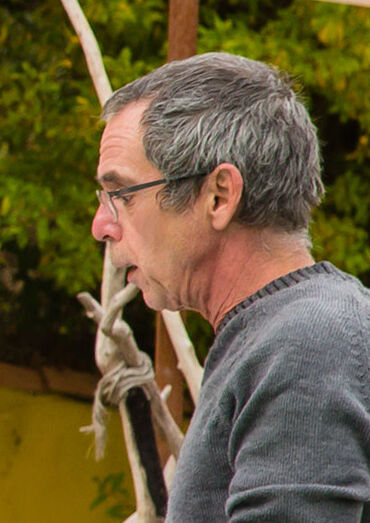
- John B. Root, in 2015
- Born: Jean Guilloré; November 28, 1958 (age 67); Chambéry, Savoy, France
- Other name: Paul Forguette
- Occupations: Director; Producer

Jean Guilloré, known professionally as John B. Root, is a French director and producer of pornographic films, born on November 28, 1958.

== Education and early career ==
Jean Guilloré was born in Chambéry. Both his parents were teachers. He spent part of his childhood and teenage years in Cairo, Egypt, where his family had relocated after 1968. He returned to France in 1976, graduated in film studies and started working as a cameraman for the French national public television. On the side, he wrote children's literature. Several of his novels were successful in their own right during the 1980s and 1990s.

== Pornography ==
During his youth, he had developed a taste for pornography and considered himself a "voyeur". At 35, after several years of marriage, he had a "mid-life crisis". In 1994, as an experiment, he created an interactive pornographic CD-ROM, the first of its kind in France, which was bought and distributed by the French version of Penthouse and met an unexpected success.

He subsequently created his own production company with the aim of developing children's television programs. However, he was unable to find buyers for his projects and, to make ends meet, started creating new porn CD-ROMS. Since he had become relatively well known as a children's writer, he started using the alias "John B. Root". "B. Root" is a play on the French slang word biroute, meaning penis, while "John Root" is a literal translation in English of Jean Racine's name.

For several years, he created a series of pornographic CD-ROMs, two of which won the award for best European CD-ROM at the Brussels International Festival of Eroticism. In 1996, he directed for Canal+ his first feature film, Cyberix, which was the first interactive French porn fiction. The next year, he directed Sextet, a more classical feature, which cemented his reputation in the French porn industry. He soon became known for his unusually well-crafted scripts and imagery. His new career, however, caused his wife to divorce him.

He quickly developed in France a reputation as an "intellectual" porn director, and his work was followed positively over the years by cultural magazines such as Les Inrockuptibles and Cahiers du cinéma. He also attracted media attention by speaking out in favor of "quality porn" and insisting that adult films could be a legitimate art form. In 1998, he wrote and open letter to the French Ministry of Culture in which he pleaded that porn should receive public funding like other forms of entertainment. John B. Root is also the producer of the majority of his films. In the course of his career, he has worked with many notable French porn performers, including Liza Del Sierra, Lou Charmelle, Coralie Trinh Thi, Karen Lancaume, Ovidie or Angell Summers. His favorite male performer is Titof, whom he considers a close friend and who has played the leading man in many of his feature films.

One of the notable aspects of his work is his advocacy in favor of safe sex. He has always insisted that his performers use condoms, with the exception of those who are legitimate partners outside their work in porn. He has stated that one of his goals is to avoid sexism and misogyny in his films, by not depicting sexual situations that could be perceived as demeaning to women.

He has also been one of the first French pornographers to use the Internet. In the early 2000s, he created the website explicite.com (later renamed and expanded as explicite-art.com) which was, in the early days of the Internet, one of the most important French porn sites. Over the years, he directed hundreds of videos for his website. For several years during the 2000s he concentrated on gonzo content, as he found the production of feature films to be too difficult and costly. In 2008, he started making scripted features again, directing one each year for Canal+. In 2005, he also started appearing as a performer, mostly in "POV" videos. In 2009, he won the Hot d'or award for best French director.

During the 2010s, his business suffered from the rise of free Internet porn and he was forced to downsize his studio and work on much lower budgets than before. He managed, however, to salvage his company and kept making films on a regular basis, while being pessimistic about the future of pornography as an art form.

He has also published in 1999 an autobiographical book, Porno blues, and in 2015 a semi-autobiographical novel, Le Pornographe et le gourou.

== Feature films ==
=== Director ===
(Also producer unless otherwise specified)

- 1996 : Cyberix
- 1997 : Sextet
- 1998 : Concupiscence
- 1998 : 24 heures d'amour
- 1998 : Exhibitions 1999
- 1998 : Sex Dreamers
- 1999 : Le Principe de plaisir
- 2000 : XYZ
- 2000 : Elixir
- 2001 : French Beauty
- 2002 : Explicite
- 2002 : Ally
- 2002 : Xperiment
- 2002 : Une nuit au bordel (produced by Marc Dorcel)
- 2003 : Inkorrekt(e)s
- 2008 : Ludivine
- 2009 : Montre-moi du rose
- 2010 : Dis-moi que tu m'aimes
- 2012 : Mangez-moi !
- 2013 : Gonzo, mode d'emploi
- 2014 : Des filles libres
- 2015 : EquinoXe
- 2016 : Des filles et du X
- 2017 : Solstix
- 2017 : Le Salon de massage (produced by Jacquie et Michel)
- 2017 : La Partouze secrète (produced by Jacquie et Michel)
- 2018 : Paris Sex affaires (produced by Private)

=== Producer only ===
- 2001 : Destroy Sex, directed by Patrick David
- 2001 : Orgasmus, directed by Loulou
- 2002 : Orgasmus 2, directed by Loulou
- 2003 : Ti'Touch - Passage à l'acte, directed by Titof
- 2008 : Ti'Touch 2, directed by Titof

== Literature ==
=== As Jean Guilloré ===
For children

- Le Voyage de Nicolas, Flammarion, 1985
- Ghostbusters : Au centre de la terre, GP, 1987
- Ghostbusters : Belfry a disparu, GP, 1987
- Ghostbusters : L'Étoile et la couronne, GP, 1987
- Ghostbusters : Les Fantômes et le magicien, GP, 1987
- Tom et les dauphins, Je bouquine, Bayard, 1989
- Les Fugitifs, Je bouquine, Bayard, 1991
- Peur bleue en mer rouge, Rageot, 1991
- Les yeux d'Antoine, Je bouquine, Bayard, 1993
- Le Fétiche de jade, Rageot, 1993
- Perdue sur Mayabora, J'aime lire, Bayard, 1994
- Mon copain bizarre, Bayard, 1995
- À la recherche de Frankie, Bayard, 1995

For older readers

- H3O, Albin Michel, 1993

=== As John B. Root ===
- Porno blues : La belle et édifiante histoire d'un réalisateur de films X, La Musardine, 1999
- Le Pornographe et le gourou, Éditions Blanche, 2015

== Awards ==
- 2008 : European X Award for best director at the Brussels International Festival of Eroticism (Ludivine)
- 2008 : European X Award for best screenplay at the Brussels International Festival of Eroticism (Ludivine)
- 2009 : Hot d'or Award for best director (Montre-moi du rose)
