= Zazel: The Scent of Love =

1997 American erotic film

Zazel
- Zazel - Blu-ray cover (2008) features Sasha Vinni as the "Blue Siren" and Anna Romero as the "She-Devil".
- Directed by: Philip Mond
- Produced by: Marco
- Starring: Sasha Vinni; Anna Romero; Brooke Lane; Gina LaMarca; Lene Hefner; Nikie St. Giles; Helena; Antonio Valentino; Kevin James; Drew Reese; Devin Deray
- Cinematography: Philip Mond
- Edited by: James Avalon
- Music by: Dino and Earl Ninn
- Production company: Cal Vista Studios
- Distributed by: Metro Interactive, LLC
- Release date: 1997
- Running time: 126 minutes
- Country: United States
- Language: English
- Budget: $237,000

Zazel: The Scent of Love (also known as "Zazel: Philip Mond's Scent of Love" and "ZTSOL") is an American erotic film, photographed in October 1995 and released in 1997. In occultism, Zȃzȇl is a spirit associated with Saturn. The film was produced by Cal Vista Studios—reportedly made at a cost of $237,000—and was directed by Dutch fashion photographer and filmmaker Philip Mond, who also did the camera work and designed the costumes and special make-up. It was Mond's second adult erotic feature after Sex Off the Runway—and like his previous film, Zazel also featured a bevy of Penthouse Pets, including 1994 Pet of the Year, Sasha Vinni; 1995 Pet of the Year, Gina LaMarca; and 1999 Pet of the Year, Nikie St. Gilles.

The film included visually elaborate set pieces; extravagant costuming, make-up and body painting; and expensive filming techniques, such as underwater photography, not normally seen in such erotic films.

== Plot ==
"Zazel" is the title character, a world-famous artist commissioned to create "the most arousing perfume ever". In the course of devising this scent, Zazel variously paints pictures, views photographs, and wanders among the flowers of her garden, each experience inspiring her to envision a powerful sexual fantasy. The film consists of nearly a dozen individually themed sequences which reference and recreate iconography drawn from mythology, religion, literature, film and even Jungian psychology. These include sirens, water nymphs, mermaids, flowers, the jungle, The Three Musketeers, classic old Hollywood movies, angels and demons, and the Jungian duality of male and female.

Each sequence features an imaginative and novel treatment of sexual activity based on these themes, as well as several visual/anatomical puns achieved through the strategic use of body paint, fetishistic costumes and accessories, and trompe-l'œil camera placement and editing trickery. It is notable that Sasha Vinni, who plays Zazel and also narrates the film, never has heterosexual intercourse in any of her scenes: she masturbates and engages in lesbian activities with the other female performers.

Zazel - DVD cover (1997) features Gina LaMarca and Sasha Vinni.

=== "Blue Siren" sequence ===
In the opening sequence, Sasha Vinni emerges from a pond as the "Blue Siren", her nude body is painted bright blue and multiple arms appear and gesticulate behind her like the Avatar of the Hindu god Vishnu. She then performs cunnilingus on the "Water Nymph" (Grace Harlow).

=== "Wild Orchid" sequence ===
Sasha Vinni as Zazel sits at her desk and airbrushes an image of a flower. A visual pun is created as the petals start to move and contract and reveal themselves as artfully painted labial folds.

=== "Bird of Paradise" sequence ===
Sasha Vinni appears as an assistant to a male lover/tattoo artist played by Devin Deray. Sasha Vinni shaves Lene Hefner's crotch with a spa razor, rinses it with an urn full of water. The tattoo artist then designs a colorful flower pattern on Hefner's vulva. The trio then engage in sex.

=== "Jungle" sequence ===
In the "Jungle" sequence, Sasha Vinni's nude body is artfully painted with tiger stripes as she writhes and crawls through tropical vegetation.

The scene ends with a close-up shot of a woman (whose face is never seen) with a tiger's face painted on her buttocks. The woman rides a man's penis, creating the illusion that the tiger's face is "fellating" him.

=== "Precious Flower" sequence ===
This sequence is yet another variation on the flower motif as Sasha Vinni is shown penetrating herself with flower-shaped objects and masturbating.

=== "Three Musketeers" sequence ===
In the "Three Musketeers" sequence, Sasha Vinni, Brooke Lane and Anna Romero appear in 17th-century-style period costume based on the characters of the Dumas novel. They strip, French kiss, perform cunnilingus on one another, and masturbate by penetrating themselves with rubber dildoes which they have outfitted on the back of their riding boots like spurs.

=== "Angels" sequence ===
The "Angels" sequence is filmed in bright, diffuse light and features three women (Sasha Vinni, Brooke Lane and Helena) as "Female Angels", each with elaborately knotted hair and coated in pale, peach-colored body paint. These three female angels perform various sexual acts with a similarly painted man outfitted with giant angel's wings (Antonio Valentino)—the "Winged Male Angel". (Anna Romero and Kevin James served as body doubles.)

=== "Old Black-and-White Movie" sequence ===
The black-and-white sequence is the only one to feature no lesbian sex at all, and it is also the only part of the film in which Sasha Vinni does not appear. It begins with Gina LaMarca as "the Seductress", wearing ornate white pasties over her breasts with a matching white crotch guard (see DVD cover above), gyrating on a bed.

The fetish accessories are soon removed and she and her male partner (Jon Severini) engage in various sexual activities. Cross-cutting from the man's final ejaculation on her belly, they are also seen performing a tumbling dive into a swimming pool while holding hands and then resurfacing to embrace and cuddle in the water.

=== "Mysterious Union" sequence ===
Sasha Vinni performs a sensuous erotic dance with one half of her face and body painted and dressed as a woman in a skirt, and the other half made up as a mustachioed man wearing a suit. Vinni takes turns showing her "female" and then "male" side to the camera while the other half remains hidden in shadow and out of view. The sequence concludes with an outlandish-looking woman—shaven-headed except for a teased-up lemon blonde mohawk (which might be a wig) and with spangled clothespins fastened to her nipples—who is seen to be fellating an ornate glass perfume bottle.

=== "Water Odyssey" sequence ===
In the penultimate sequence in the film, Sasha Vinni and Nikie St. Gilles appear as mermaids outfitted with tail fins. They dispense with the mermaid accessories and engage in lesbian activities. As in the "Blue Siren" sequence, some of the cunnilingus activity is filmed underwater.

=== "Diablo d'Inferno" sequence ===
The "Diablo d'Inferno" sequence features Anna Romero as a "She-Devil" in a fetishistic red latex devil's costume—outfitted with red latex horns, red latex ballet boots, open-bottomed red latex hot pants, and a long red latex forked devil's tail protruding from a flared butt plug attachment that is embedded in her rectum. (Although Sasha Vinni appears in this costume on the U.S. DVD cover [see image above], only Anna Romero wears it in the film.) During this sequence the lower portion of the screen is filled with digitally superimposed flames for atmospheric effect.

The She-Devil sneaks up behind Zazel, who is sitting at a table airbrushing a design of the She-Devil and her costume, and "decapitates" the artist with a scythe. The She-Devil crawls around Zazel's freshly "severed" head, now placed upon the table. The She-Devil grips the shaft of her latex tail and pushes the butt plug attachment deeper into her anus before thrusting her vulva into Zazel's face. The She-Devil French kisses Zazel's head and continues to anally masturbate with the tail/butt plug.

The scene continues with the She-Devil (now with the tail/butt plug removed) having sex with a "Gargoyle" (Kevin James) and a "Demon Man" (Drew Reese), which ends with a vaginal/anal double penetration.

== Home media ==
In 2008, Cal Vista re-released Zazel on DVD in a re-mastered high-definition widescreen two-disc edition; a Blu-ray edition followed soon after. The bonus features included a deleted scene as well as a preview of Zazel 2.

== Cast ==
- Sasha Vinni – Zazel/Blue Siren/Tiger/Brunette Musketeer/Female Angel/Mermaid
- Grace Harlow – Water Nymph
- Lene Hefner – Tattooed Girl
- Devin Deray – Tattoo Artist
- Anna Romero – Redhead Musketeer/Body Double for Female Angel/She-Devil
- Brooke Lane – Blonde Musketeer/Female Angel
- Antonio Valentino – Winged Male Angel
- Helena – Female Angel
- Gina LaMarca – Seductress
- Jon Severini – Man
- Nikie St. Gilles – Blonde Beauty Mermaid
- Kevin James – Gargoyle/Body Double for Winged Male Angel
- Drew Reese – Demon Man

== Awards ==
- Zazel is listed as "26th" in "The 101 Greatest Adult Tapes Of All Time" by AVN Magazine.
- Zazel – Winner – Seven AVN Awards (1998):
  - Best All-Sex Film
  - Best Group Scene
  - Best Cinematography
  - Best Art Direction
  - Best Editing (James Avalon)
  - Best Overall Marketing Campaign
  - Best Selling Tape of the Year
- Zazel – Winner – Hot d'Or Award (1998):
  - Best New American Director (Philip Mond)
- Zazel – Winner – AVN Award (2009):
  - Best Classic Release (Two-Disc DVD: HD Widescreen Re-Mastered)

== See also ==
The following listing includes directors known for similar adult erotic films:

- Andrew Blake
- Fashion photography
- Glamour photography
- Helmut Newton
- James Avalon
- Mario Salieri
- Michael Ninn
- Radley Metzger (aka "Henry Paris")
- Tinto Brass
