= Philip Mond =

Dutch fashion photographer and film director

- Occupations: Fashion photographer and film director
- Years active: 1995 – present
- Known for: adult erotic films
- Awards: Seven AVN Awards (1998), AVN Award (2009), and Hot d'Or Award (1998): For Zazel (US, 1997).

Philip Mond is a Dutch fashion photographer and film director. In some of his films, he was also an actor, costume designer, set designer and make-up artist. Mond won numerous awards for his films, including for the 1997 adult film Zazel: The Scent of Love. Over the years, Mond has worked with many actresses, including Penthouse magazine's Pets of the Month, like Sasha Vinni (Pet of the Month for September 1991 and Pet of the Year for 1994), Gina LaMarca (May 1993; Pet of the Year 1995) and Nikie St. Gilles (March 1997 and Pet of the Year 1999). Philip Mond's real-life partner, Gina Mond, a former Penthouse model, starred in several films made by the director, including Insexts (2006) and Sinema (2007).

== Awards (selected) ==
- Zazel: The Scent of Love is listed as "26th" in "The 101 Greatest Adult Tapes Of All Time" by AVN magazine.
- Zazel: The Scent of Love – Winner – Seven AVN Awards (1998):
  - Best All-Sex Film
  - Best Group Scene
  - Best Cinematography
  - Best Art Direction
  - Best Editing (James Avalon)
  - Best Overall Marketing Campaign
  - Best Selling Tape of the Year
- Zazel – Winner – Hot d'Or Award (1998):
  - Best New American Director (Philip Mond)
- Zazel – Winner – AVN Award (2009):
  - Best Classic Release (Two-Disc DVD: HD Widescreen Re-Mastered)
- Sinema – Nominations – Two AVN Award Nominations (2008):
  - Best Director – Non-Feature – AVN Awards Nomination
  - Best Videography – AVN Awards Nomination

== Filmography (selected) ==
- Making of the Carousel Girls Calendar (1993)
- Sex Off the Runway (1996)
- Zazel: The Scent of Love (1997)
- Amazing Sex Talk 1 (1998)
- The World of Philip Mond (1999)
- Insexts (2006)
- Sinema (2007)

== See also ==
- Andrew Blake
- Helmut Newton
- Michael Ninn
- Radley Metzger
- Tinto Brass
