= Totoro =

Totoro may refer to:

- Totoro, the titular character of the 1988 Japanese animated film My Neighbor Totoro by Studio Ghibli
  - My Neighbour Totoro (play)
  - Eoperipatus totoro, a species of velvet worm named for its resemblance to Catbus from My Neighbor Totoro
  - Ghibli totoro, a species of parasitoid wasp from Bolivia, named after the character
  - 10160 Totoro, a minor planet named after My Neighbor Totoro
- Totoro Station, a railway station in Japan
- Totoró, Cauca, a town and municipality in the Cauca Department, Colombia
  - Totoro language, a language of Colombia
- Satsuki Totoro, a Japanese wrestler

== See also ==
- Toroto (disambiguation)
