= The Idiot Cycle =

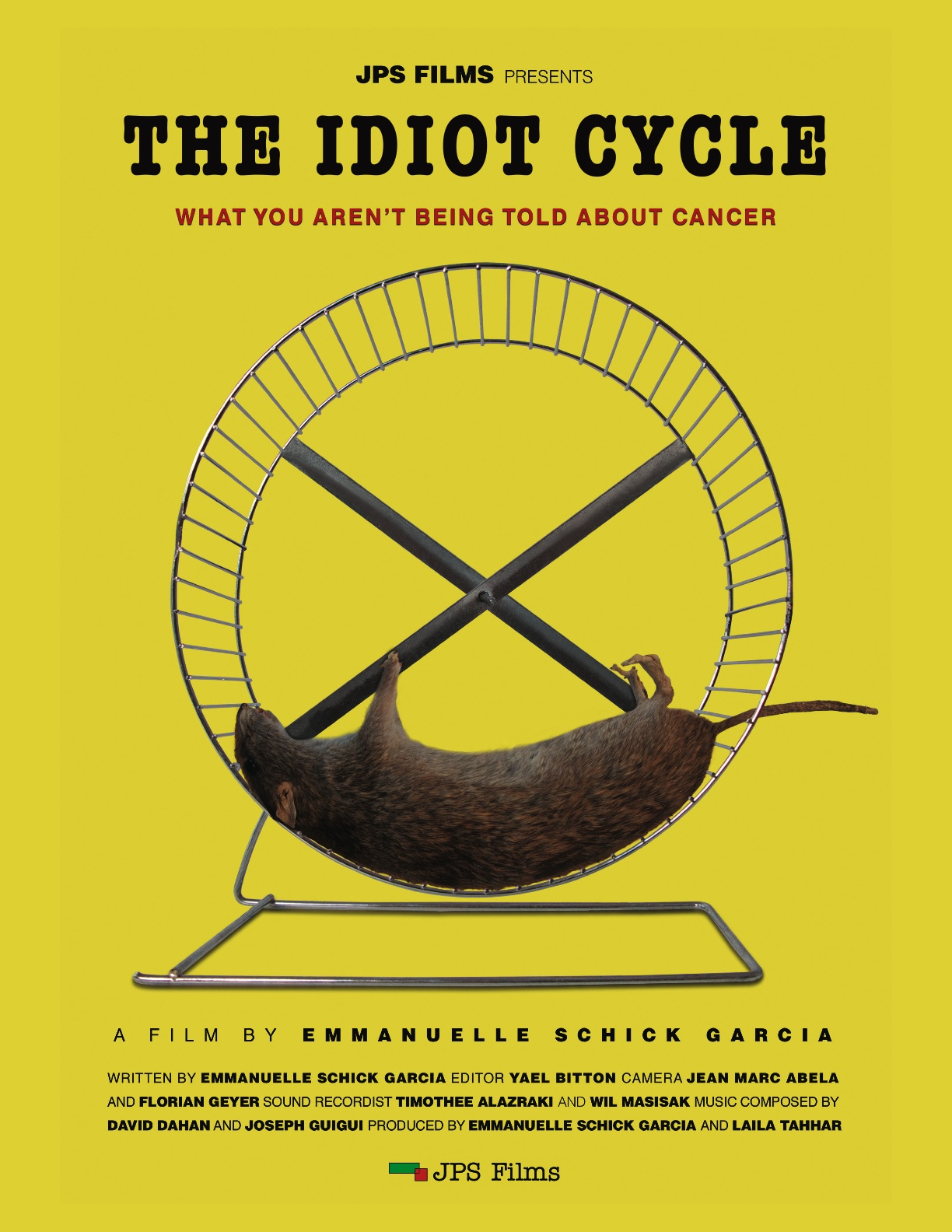
- Directed by: Emmanuelle Schick Garcia
- Written by: Emmanuelle Schick Garcia
- Produced by: Emmanuelle Schick Garcia and Laila Tahhar
- Narrated by: Emmanuelle Schick Garcia
- Cinematography: Jean Marc Abela, Florian Geyer
- Edited by: Yael Bitton
- Music by: Joseph Guigui, David Dahan
- Production company: JPS Films
- Distributed by: JPS Films
- Release date: September 25, 2009 (Canada)
- Running time: 96 minutes
- Country: France
- Languages: French; English

The Idiot Cycle is a 2009 French-Canadian documentary which alleges that six major chemical companies are responsible for decades of cancer causing chemicals and pollution, and also develop cancer treatments and drugs. It also argues these companies own the most patents on genetically modified crops that have never been tested for long term health impacts like cancer.

== Production ==
The film was shot in Canada (Sarnia, Ottawa, Toronto, ON and Saskatoon, SK), the United States (Memphis, TN, Midland, MI, and Washington DC), The Netherlands (Amsterdam), France (Agen, Paris), Italy (Bologna), Germany (Weilheim, Frankfurt, Bad Neihum, Burladingen, Tübingen), Belgium (Brussels), England (London, Hemel Hempstead), and Northern Ireland (Coleraine).

== Film festivals ==
=== Awards ===
- "Green Report" Award - Romanian Film Festival Document.Art.

=== Appearances ===
- RIDM (Montreal)
- IDFA (Amsterdam)
- OXDOX (Oxford)
- International Health Film Festival (Greece)
