= Laure Sainclair =

French former adult film actress (born 1972)

- Born: 24 April 1972 (age 53); Rennes, France
- Height: 5 ft 3 in (1.60 m)
- Website: www.lauresainclair.com

Laure Sainclair (French pronunciation: [lɔʁ sɛ̃klɛːʁ]; born 24 April 1972) is a French former adult film actress.

Sainclair first worked as a model for nude photography. She eventually met pornographic actresses at an adult entertainment convention in Rennes, and decided to try her hand at the sex industry. She worked for a time as a stripper, then made her first adult film in 1995, a semi-amateur production titled Maud s'offre à toi. Her first experience was a negative one but she eventually met producer Marc Dorcel who made her his first contract performer. and "brand ambassador". Sainclair went on to be the most popular adult film actress in France during the second half of the 1990s.

She won several awards in Europe and also made a small number of films in the U.S. She received Hot d'Or Awards for Best European Starlet in 1996 and for Best European Actress in 1997 and 1998 (for Les Nuits de la Présidente – Video Marc Dorcel).

In 1999, after her contract with Dorcel ended, she left the sex industry, and later entirely disavowed her adult film career. She tried to reinvent herself as a singer, but without success. In 2012, she sued her former music producer, who had also been her life partner, for rape and domestic abuse.

== Discography ==
- Vous (2001)
- Pourquoi tu pars? / Por qué te vas (2001)
- Besoin de toi (2004)
