= Zazel (spirit) =

Demon of Saturn in magic

Zȃzȇl (Hebrew: זאזל, romanized: Zazl) is the darker spirit (demon) of Saturn, mentioned as a spirit in such works as the Key of Solomon. As it says on the 10th Plate: "The First Pentacle of Mercury.--It serveth to invoke the Spirits who are under the Firmament." Zazel is described as being one of the presiding spirits, either the forty-fifth or the forty-ninth, with 'Agȋȇl, of Saturn, and has been described as a great angel, invoked in Solomonic magic, who is "effective in love conjurations".

== See also ==
- Azazel
- The Lesser Key of Solomon
- Magical Treatise of Solomon
- Saturn § Pre-telescopic observation
- Testament of Solomon
- Zazel: The Scent of Love – 1997 American erotic film
