= Le dossier Toroto =

Le Dossier Toroto
- Directed by: Jean-Pierre Mocky
- Written by: Jean-Pierre Mocky
- Cinematography: Jean-Paul Sergent
- Edited by: Michel Cosma
- Music by: Vladimir Cosma
- Production company: Mocky Delicious Products
- Release date: March 30, 2011 (France)
- Running time: 64 minutes
- Country: France
- Language: French
- Budget: €37,000

Le dossier Toroto is a 2011 French film directed by Jean-Pierre Mocky.

== Cast ==
- Jean Abeillé (Professeur Toroto)
- Jean-Pierre Mocky (Le professeur Lapine)
- Romain Gontier (Riri)
- Olivier Hémon (Le Brigadier)
- Guillaume Delaunay (Vitupin 1)
- Lionel Laget (Vitupin 2)
- Emmanuel Nakach (Joseph)
- Pamela Ravassard (Marie)
- Jean Luc Atlan (Docteur Klaus)
- Anksa Kara (Irma, l'intendante)
- Raphaël Scheer (Le Nonce du Pape)
- Christian Chauvaud (Marco Le chef des grosses bites)
- Idriss (Marco 2)
- Pascal Lagrandeur (Membre des grosses bites)
- Julie Baronnie (Mme Baron)
- Serge Bos (Le prêtre)
- Fabien Jegoudez (Le professeur Suédois)
- Noël Simsolo (Mr Noir / Blanc)
- Marie Noelle Pigeau (Mme Noir / Blanc)
- Mauricette Gourdon (Ida)
- Jean Christophe Herbert (Père Blanc)
- Jana Bittnerova (Femme du Brigadier)
- Cyrille Dobbels (Politique 1)
- Alain Schlosberg (Politique 2)
- Christophe Bier (Politique 3)
- Patrick Lebadezai (Politique 4)
- Michel Stobac (Colonel Pascal au cul poilu)
- Eric Cornet (Lieutenant)
- Alexis Wawerka (Moine)
- Jean Philippe Bonnet (Moine 2)
- Fabrice Colson (Robert)
- Laure Hennequart (Infirmière)
- Françoise Armelle (Chienne de Garde)
- Clément Bobo (Riri 10 ans)
- Charlotte Ciprey (Cousine Riri)
- Joelle Hélary (Dame Marriage 1)
- Valérie Lejeune (Dame Marriage 2)

== See also ==
- Cinema of France
- List of French language films
