= Michael Ninn =

American adult film director

- Occupation: Adult film director
- Years active: 1992 – present
- Known for: adult erotic films
- Website: https://www.michaelninn.com

Michael Ninn is an adult film director and writer. He began his career as a music video director and made his first adult films in 1992.

== Adult film career ==
In 1992, Ninn made his first adult erotic films – Black Orchid, Principles of Lust and Two Sisters. The next year he signed with VCA Pictures and went on to produce a series of award-winning films, including Sex, Latex and Shock.

Ninn's production company, Ninn Worx, has produced dozens of films that have won more than 70 AVN Awards. In 1997, Shock won eleven awards, including "Best Director" and "Best Video Feature". In 2005, the Ninn Worx film Fetish Circus won the 2005 AVN award for "Best DVD", and Lost Angels: Katsumi won "Best Foreign All-Sex Release". In 2006, Ninn won the AVN Award for "Best Director - Non Feature" for the film Neo Pornographia.

In 2006, Eddie Van Halen contributed to the soundtrack of Ninn's film Sacred Sin.

In 2013 Ninn received an XBIZ Award nomination for "Director of the Year - Feature Release" for The Four. He also was nominated for seven AVN Awards in 2013 for The Four.

== Awards ==
AVN Awards
Year	Award	Film
1996	Best Director-Video	Latex
1997	Best Director-Video	Shock
1997	Best Editing-Video	Shock
1997	Best Editing-Gay Video	Night Walk
2002	AVN Hall of Fame	—N/a
2003	Best Videography	Perfect
2006	Best Director - Non Feature	Neo Pornographia
2014	Best Director – Foreign Feature (shared with Max Candy)	The Ingenuous

Hot d'Or Awards
Year	Award	Film
1996	Best American Director	Latex
1997	Best American Director	Body Shock
1999	Best American Director	La Nuit Sans Fin
2000	Best American Director	Ritual

NightMoves Awards
Year	Award
2005	Best Director (Editor's Choice)

XRCO Awards
Year	Award
1996	Director of the Year
2006	XRCO Hall of Fame

== See also ==
- Andrew Blake
- Helmut Newton
- Philip Mond
- Radley Metzger
- Tinto Brass
