= Hot d'Or =

French pornographic film award

- Golden Hot
- Sponsored by: Hot Vidéo
- Location: Cannes and Paris
- Country: France
- Reward: Hot d'Or d'honneur
- First award: 1992
- Final award: 2001, 2009, 2023
- Website: hot-dor.fr

Television/radio coverage
- Network: Canal+

Hot d'Or (English: Golden Hot) was an adult film industry pornographic award, awarded annually from 1992 to 2001 in Cannes, France by the French trade journal Hot Vidéo.

== Overview ==
The awards have been described as the porn equivalent of the Palme d'Or or the Academy Awards. The analogous American honor is the AVN Award. The inaugural event was held over two weeks in May in a hotel complex, at exactly the same time as the Cannes Film Festival. Venues included the Royal Casino Hotel, situated five miles from the Croisette. In 1997, the event was held at the Lido in Paris.

The Hot d'Or was noted for the lavish parties that accompanied it, particularly those held by Private Media Group on board a yacht in Cannes marina. The event attracted many performers, paparazzi, directors, and producers and distributors who would make deals buying and selling films. The event would often court publicity by having porn stars pose naked on the public beach. Consequently, it attracted attention from international media who were in town for the mainstream festival.

The highest award given was the Hot d'Or d'honneur, which was awarded to figures including Estelle Desanges, Marc Dorcel, Julia Channel, John Stagliano, Internet Entertainment Group and Ona Zee.

=== 20th anniversary ===
After an eight-year absence, the awards returned to Paris on October 20, 2009 to commemorate the 20th anniversary of Hot Vidéo magazine. They were held at Salle Wagram at the art deco Radisson Hotel, and French pop star Helmut Fritz performed at the show. French television giant Canal Plus had the rights to broadcast the show during their late-night block of adult programming.

== Reception and review ==
Hot d'Ors presence was not particularly welcomed by the Cannes Film Festival or Cannes city officials. In 1998 (when the awards were again held in Cannes), Steve Vlottes of Wicked Pictures said the awards were: "the most important show that we attend".

== Award history ==
1st Annual Hot d'Or (1992)

- Best Foreign Actress: Zara Whites - Rêves de cuir
- Best French Actress: Carole Tennessy
- Best American Actress: Ashlyn Gere
- Best European Actor: Christoph Clark - Le clown by Nils Molitor
- Best Foreign Director: John Leslie
- Best Foreign Film: La Chatte 2

2nd Annual Hot d'Or (1993)

- Best European Actress: Angelica Bella (Hungary)
- Best European Starlet: Tabatha Cash
- Best European Director: Michel Ricaud
- Best European Film: Arabica
- Best Original Screenplay: L'Affaire Savannah by Vidéo Marc Dorcel

3rd Annual Hot d'Or (1994)

- Best European Actress: Tabatha Cash (France)
- Best European Starlet: Valy Verdi
- Best European Actor: Christophe Clark - Délit de Séduction by Michel Ricaud
- Best European Director: Michel Ricaud
- Hot d'Or d'honneur: Zara Whites
- Best European Film: Délit de Séduction by Vidéo Marc Dorcel
- Best Original Screenplay: Photographic Modelling by Xavier Bonastre

4th Annual Hot d'Or (1995)

- Best European Actress: Draghixa (France) - Le Parfum de Mathilde
- Best European Starlet: Barbara Doll
- Best French Actress: Coralie
- Best American Actress: Ashlyn Gere
- Best American Starlet: Chasey Lain
- Best European Actor: Christophe Clark - Citizen Shane by Michel Ricaud with Anita Rinaldi
- Best New Director: Rocco Siffredi
- Best European Director: Marc Dorcel
- Best European Film: Citizen Shane by Vidéo Marc Dorcel
- Best Original Screenplay: Le Parfum de Mathilde by Vidéo Marc Dorcel
- Best Amateur Series: L'École de Laetitia

5th Annual Hot d'Or (1996)

- Best European Actress: Coralie
- Best European Supporting Actress: Élodie Chérie
- Best European Starlet: Laure Sinclair
- Best American Actress: Jenna Jameson
- Best American Starlet: Jenna Jameson
- Best European Actor: Rocco Siffredi
- Best American Actor: Marc Davis
- Best New Actor: David Perry
- Best European Director: Marc Dorcel (The Princess and The Whore)
- Best American Director: Michael Ninn (Latex)
- Best New Director: Christoph Clark (Young Widows Lustful)
- Hot d'Or d'honneur: Richard Allan
- Best European Film: La Princesse et La Pute (The Princess and The Whore - Marc Dorcel)
- Best American Film: Latex (Michael Ninn)
- Best First French Production: Blue Mask
- Best Lesbian Film: Les Chiennes (The Bitches)
- Best Original Screenplay: Gigolo
- Best Cover: Le Désir Dans La Peau (Desire In The Skin)
- Best Remake or Adaptation: La Princesse et La Pute (The Princess and The Whore - Marc Dorcel)
- Best American Pro-am Series - Buttman
- Best French Pro-Am Series - School of Laetitia
- Best Gold AVN American Film - Buttman's European Vacation 3
- Hot Platinum K7 - Latex

6th Annual Hot d'Or (1997)

- Best European Actress: Laure Sainclair
- Best European Supporting Actress: Olivia Del Rio (La Ruée vers Laure)
- Best European Starlet: Nikki Anderson (Sweet Lady)
- Best American Actress: Jenna Jameson
- Best American Starlet: Kobe Tai
- Best European Actor: Rocco Siffredi
- Best Supporting European Actor: Richard Langin
- Best American Actor: Vince Vouyer
- Best New Actor: Philippe Dean
- Best European Director: Pierre Woodman (The Pyramid)
- Best American Director: Michael Ninn (Body Shock)
- Best New American Director: Kris Kramski (Sexhibition)
- Best European Film: The Pyramid (Private - Pierre Woodman)
- Best American Film: Conquest
- Best French Film - Middle Budget: The Magnifix
- Best Original Screenplay: The Pyramid
- Best Cover: The Pyramid
- Best Pro-Am French Series: Les Infirmières de Laetitia (The Laetitia Nurses)
- Best Pro-Am American Series: Venom
- Best Screenplay - Adaptation or Remake: Cape Town
- Platinum Movie 1997: The Fugitive (Private - Pierre Woodman)
- AVN d'Or for Best American Film: Ben Dover's Fresh Cheeks

7th Annual Hot d'Or (1998)

- Best European Actress: Laure Sainclair (Les Nuits de la Presidente - Video Marc Dorcel)
- Best European Supporting Actress: Coralie
- Best European Starlet: Jade
- Best American Actress: Jenna Jameson (Sexe de Feu, Coeur de Glace - Wicked Pictures)
- Best American Starlet: Stacy Valentine
- Best European Actor: Roberto Malone
- Best European Supporting Actor: Andrew Youngman
- Best American Actor: Mark Davis (Decadence - Michael Ninn)
- Best New Actor: Ramon
- Best European Director: Pierre Woodman
- Best New European Director: Anita Rinaldi
- Best American Director: Kris Kramski
- Best New American Director: Philip Mond (Zazel)
- Best European Film: Tatiana (Private)
- Best American Film: Lisa (Sin City)
- Best French Film: Bad Boy
- Best Original Screenplay: Tatiana
- Best Remake or Adaptation: La Belle et la Bête
- Best Box Cover: Paris Chic (Andrew Blake)
- Best American Pro-Am Series: World Sex Tour (Anabolic)
- Best French Pro-Am Series: L’école de Laetitia
- Hot d'Or d'honneurs: Marc Dorcel, Julia Channel, John Stagliano, and Internet Entertainment Group (for the release of The Pamela Anderson Home Video or Pam & Tommy Lee - Hardcore & Uncensored)

8th Annual Hot d'Or (1999)

- Best American Actress: Jill Kelly (Exile)
- Best European Actress: Nikki Anderson (L'Enjeu Du Desir and Rocco Never Dies)
- Best European Supporting Actress: Dolly Golden
- Best American Starlet: Jewel De'Nyle
- Best European Starlet: Kate More
- Best American Actor: Mark Davis
- Best European Actor: David Perry (L'Enjeu Du Desir)
- Best European Supporting Actor: Marc Barrow (Croupe Du Monde)
- Best New Actor: Ian Scott
- Best European Movie: L'Enjeu Du Desir
- Best American Movie: Flashpoint
- Best All-Sex Film: Planet Sexxx 2
- Best French Pro-Am Series: Hongrie Interdite
- Best American Pro-Am series: The Voyeur
- Best American Director: Michael Ninn
- Best European Director: Alain Payet (Le Labyrinthe)
- Best New European Director: Fred Coppula (Niqueurs Nes)
- Best New American Director: Gary Sage (Carnal Obsessions)
- Best Screenplay: Alain Payet
- Best Box Cover: L'Enjeu Du Desir

9th Annual Hot d'Or (2000)

- Best Boxcover: L'Esclave des sens - VMD
- Best Screenplay: L'Emmerdeuse - Fred Coppula, Blue One
- Best Remake or Adaptation: Les Tontons Tringleurs (Alain Payet - Blue One)
- Best American Starlet: Tera Patrick
- Best European Starlet: Meridian
- Best French Starlet: Estelle Desanges
- Best American Actress: Stacy Valentine
- Best European Actress: Laura Angel
- Best French Actress: Dolly Golden
- Best European Supporting Actor: Marc Barrow, Hotdorix Colmax
- Best European Supporting Actress: Sylvia Saint (Le Contrat des Anges - Video Marc Dorcel)
- Best American Pro-Am Series: The Voyeur - VMD
- Best European Pro-Am Series: Euro Anal - Maeva
- Best French Amateur Series: Le Fantasmotron - Luxor
- Best American Actor: Randy Spears, DMJ 6 Blue One
- Best European Actor: Ian Scott - L'Emmerdeuse Dolly Golden, Les Tontons Tringleurs Blue One
- Hot d'Or d'honneur: Ona Zee
- Best European New Director: Gabriel Zéro - La Verité si tu bandes!, Lucy
- Best American Director: Michael Ninn, Ritual Blue One
- Best European Director: Fred Coppula - L'Emmerdeuse, Blue One
- AVN d'Or - Best European Release in the US: Then Rocco Meats Kelly 2 - Rocco Siffredi & Evil Angel
- Best DVD: La Ruée Vers Laure - VMD
- Platinum Movie (Editors' Choice): Machos - Blue One
- Best French Movie: Middle Budget La Soirée des Connes Patrice Cabanel, JTC
- Best American Movie: Ritual - Michael Ninn, Blue One
- Best European Movie: L'Emmerdeuse - Fred Coppula, Blue One

10th Annual Hot d'Or (2001)

Award winners:

- Best Actress - "vote des professionnels": Océane
- Best Actor - "vote des professionnels": Sebastian Barrio
- Best European Actress: Daniella Rush (Orgie en noir)
- Best European Supporting Actress: Estelle Desanges (Project X)
- Best European Starlet: Judith Fox
- Best French Actress: Océane (Project X)
- Best French Starlet: Clara Morgane
- Best American Actress: Tera Patrick (Crossroads)
- Best American Starlet: Briana Banks
- Best European Supporting Actor: Marc Barrow (Profession: Gros Cul)
- Best European Actor: Ian Scott (Max)
- Best American Actor: Mark Davis (Justine's Daughter: Nothing to Hide 3)
- Best Director: Pierre Woodman (Madness)
- Best Director - "vote des professionnels": Fred Coppula (Max)
- Best Film: Stavros (Mario Salieri - Colmax)
- Best Film - "vote des professionnels": Max (Fred Coppula - Blue One)
- Best French Film - Middle Budget: Stavros (Colmax)
- Best Original Screenplay: Orgie en noir (Ovidie - VMD)
- Best Cover: Madness (Private)
- Best Videocassette: Soirée de connes (Patrice Cabanel)
- Hot d'Or d'honneur:

- Sharon Mitchell
- Paul Fishbein
- Ovidie
- Thierry Ardisson

- Hot d'Or Hall of Fame: Larry Flynt

11th Hot d'Or (2009) for the 20th Anniversary of Hot Video magazine

The complete list of winners follows:

- Best French Starlet: Angell Summers
- Best European Starlet: Black Angelika
- Best American Starlet: Kayden Kross
- Best Adult Website: www.sexyavenue.com
- Best French Actress: Katsuni (Pirates II: Stagnetti's Revenge - Digital Playground)
- Best European Actress: Tarra White (Billionaire - Private)
- Best American Actress: Jesse Jane (Pirates II: Stagnetti's Revenge - Digital Playground)
- Best French Actor: Sebastian Barrio (Blanche, Alice, Sandy et les autres - Alkrys)
- Best American Actor: Evan Stone (Pirates II: Stagnetti's Revenge - Digital Playground)
- Best Actress’ Blog: Katsuni - ilovekatsuni.com
- Best French Female Performer: Cecilia Vega
- Best European Female Performer: Tarra White
- Best American Female Performer: Jenna Haze
- Best French Director: John B. Root (Montre-moi du rose - JBR Media)
- Best European Director: Alessandro Del Mar (Billionaire - Private)
- Best American Director: John Stagliano (Fashionistas Safado Berlin - Evil Angel/Marc Dorcel)
- Best French Pro-Am Director: Enola Suger and Al Arash (le Porntour - Swipp)
- Best European Gonzo Director: Christoph Clark (Angel Perverse - Evil Angel)
- Best American Gonzo Director: Manuel Ferrara (Slutty and Sluttier - VCV/Evil Angel)
- Best French Male Performer: Manuel Ferrara
- Best European Male Performer: Nacho Vidal
- Best American Male Performer: Lexington Steele
- Best French Screenplay: Blanche, Alice, Sandy et les autres by Christian Lavil (Alkrys)
- Best European Screenplay: Billionaire by Alessandro Del Mar (Private)
- Best American Screenplay: Pirates II: Stagnetti's Revenge by Joone (Digital Playground)
- Best French Movie: Ritual by Moire Candy/ Max Candy (Marc Dorcel)
- Best European Movie: Billionaire by Alessandro Del Mar (Private)
- Best American Movie: Pirates II: Stagnetti’s Revenge by Joone (Digital Playground)

Honorary Awards:

- Second Sexe
- Alpha France
- Coralie
- Piotr Stanislas
- Gérard Kikoïne
- Evil Angel
- Ovidie and Jack Tyler
- Adam & Eve
- Estelle Desanges
