= Alessandro Del Mar =

- Born: Naples, Italy
- Occupation: Film director

Alessandro Occhiobello (born in Naples, Italy) is an Italian pornographic film director and actor who is also known under the names "Max Bellocchio", "Max Bollecchio" and "Toni Montana". He has directed over 200 films since 1993.

== Awards and nominations ==
- 2008 AVN Award winner – Best Director, Foreign Release (Dangerous Sex)
- 2009 Hot d'Or Award winner – Best European Director, Best European Screenplay, and Best European Movie (all for the movie Billionaire - Private)
