= Pierre Woodman =

French pornographic film director (born 1963)

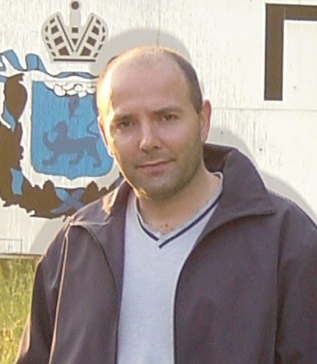
- Born: Pierre André Nicolas Gerbier; 29 April 1963 (age 63); Auvergne, France
- Other names: Jean-Paul Bouchet, Pierre Boismonsieur
- Occupations: Director, actor, photographer
- Years active: 1986–present
- Employer(s): Private Media Group, LFP, Woodman Entertainment
- Spouse: Tania Russof (m. 1995; div. 2000)
- Partner: Sophie Paris (2002–present)
- Children: 4
- Awards: Hot d'Or Award (1997, 1998, 2001); Ninfa Award (2003, 2004, 2007)

Pierre Woodman (born Pierre André Nicolas Gerbier; 29 April 1963) is a French pornographic film director. He is best known for his casting series where he specializes in having first-time female adult models perform rough anal sex, double penetration, and gang bangs. Woodman has been accused of violating consent and coercing models to perform acts against their will, including using physical violence to force models to swallow semen and urine. Early in his career, Woodman would arrange meetings with women in hotel rooms under the guise of fashion modelling before revealing his intent of having them engage in sexual acts.

== Career ==
Woodman joined the army at age 17, and later became a policeman. In 1986, he started a career as a fashion and TV photographer. In 1989, he took part in launching the magazine Hot Video, as a reporter. In 1992, he started working for Private Media Group, Inc., for which he made several movies, such as The Pyramid, Tatiana, and Riviera. In 1997, Woodman launched his series "Casting X".

In 1999, Woodman began to produce and release his Superfuckers series for Private. At the end of the year, he received an invitation from Larry Flynt, owner of LFP, Inc. and a publisher of the magazine Hustler. Woodman produced several movies for the company before departing in 2005.

In 2004, after playing himself in the Spanish film Yo Puta, alongside Denise Richards and Daryl Hannah, he did several photo-shoots for fashion magazines, such as Vogue and Blast.

Woodman then launched a program affiliation on the Internet called "Spider-Cash", to distribute its films in the form of video sequences, after Berth Milton, head of Private, asked Woodman to return to work for him in 2005. Woodman left Private in June 2006 for a second time and announced that he was creating his own production and distribution company, Woodman Entertainment.

=== "Castings X" productions ===
With the breakup of the former Soviet Union in the early 1990s, Central and Eastern Europe became a new center of pornographic production, with actresses available for a fraction of the cost of American performers. In 1992, Woodman started his casting film series for Private. Woodman's "Castings X" movies were first released in October 1997. The movies were released by Private between 1997 and 2003, after which Hustler started distributing them under the label "Hustler Casting Couch". In April 2008, Woodman announced that Woodman Entertainment would issue new movies and scenes of the Casting X series.

The casting scenes are typically filmed in hotel rooms, usually in Central Europe. During the 1990s, the actresses would be invited to a meeting with Woodman under the guise of working as a fashion model, which would be filmed with a hidden camera. Woodman would then show the actresses a Private magazine featuring pornographic images and then inviting them to do similar sexual acts with him. While some actresses would initially refuse to perform the acts and voice their disappointment at being tricked, Woodman would spend an extensive amount of time convincing them to change their mind, often cutting this portion from the final movie or scene. The sexual acts often involve rough anal sex with slapping and verbal abuse, and urination. During the 2000s, Woodman would begin interviewing models before engaging in sexual acts, after which he would often bring in several male co-performers to engage in group sex acts, at times to the surprise of the female model.

Woodman has released 225 DVDs from his "Casting X" series, featuring mostly European actresses. In an interview, he claimed to have more than 7,000 scenes in stock. In 2009, the Netherlands branch of HBO TV made a 52-minute report about his life called "Pierre Woodman Story".

== Controversies ==
In 2013, following the airing of a documentary on Woodman, the French online magazine Le Tag Parfait published an article that accused the director of pushing unsuspecting performers into engaging in unplanned sexual acts with him. In 2017, Lana Rhoades accused Woodman of coercing her into performing acts she did not want to do during a shoot and that he allegedly admitted to violating another woman's rights to her. In 2022, Woodman was interviewed by Louis Theroux for a BBC broadcast and was questioned about disregarding his models' consent. During the interview he admitted to engaging in acts with his performers that were not previously talked about or agreed upon.

== Personal life ==
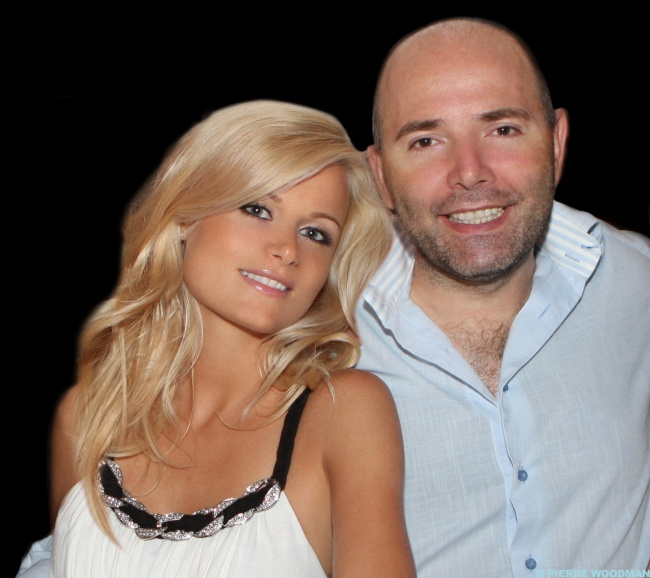
Pierre Woodman and Sophie Paris

Woodman has been married three times and is the father of four children. He was divorced from the Russian porn star Tania Russof in 2000. Since 2002, he has lived with another pornstar Sophie Paris, whom he met during a shoot for his casting series. He is the father of French writer Alexandra Geyser.

== Awards and nominations ==
- 1997 Hot d'Or Award winner - Best European Director (The Pyramid)
- 1997 Hot d'Or Award winner - Platinum Movie 1997 (The Fugitive - Private)
- 1998 Hot d'Or Award winner - Best European Director
- 2001 Hot d'Or Award winner - Best Director (Madness)
- 2003 Special Award of the Ninfa Organization winner
- 2004 Ninfa Lifetime Career Award winner
- 2007 Ninfa Award winner - Best Director (Public)
