= Ovidie =

French pornographic actress, director, author and sex educator

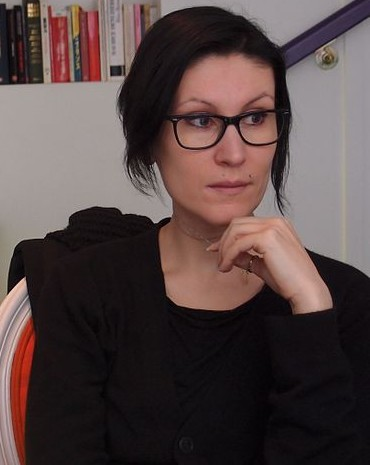
- Ovidie in 2014
- Born: 25 August 1980 (age 46); Lille, France
- Height: 5 ft 9.25 in (1.76 m)
- Website: http://www.metronews.fr/blog/ovidie/

Ovidie is a French director, actress, producer, journalist, former porn actress and a writer. First known as a porn actress from 1999 to 2003, she has since directed pornographic films as well as documentaries and has written several books.

== Overview ==
Ovidie refused to give her real name to the press. Her parents are liberals from "a good family background" who were teachers in 2003. She was married; her husband left a teaching position at the University of Paris to edit a pornographic magazine. They later divorced, but her job was not a factor in the divorce.

Ovidie has denied entering the pornography industry for either sex or money, describing herself as middle class. Her involvement in dance and choreography, and her interest in expression of the human body, played a part in attracting her to the industry.

At the time she became a pornographic actress, she described herself as a "very active militant feminist". She first viewed pornography to get a sense of the injustice that was being perpetrated on female industry workers. She found herself surprised when female porn stars, who she once felt sorry for, impressed her with their powerful sexual images. Wanting to attain this same kind of sexual strength, which seemed compatible with feminist ideals, she began acting in pornographic films. She told The Times Magazine "I am interested in these sort of experiences not just because I am perverse, which as you have seen I can be when I want to be. No, it's because not everyone can achieve them."

During her active career as pornographic performer, she rarely did anal sex scenes, and she required her partners to use a condom in every role except her first.

Ovidie was an active porn performer until 2003, when she was featured in the porn/mainstream crossover film All About Anna. She has also been active as a porn director, both during her years as a performer and afterward. After only one year of performing, her first film as a director, Orgie en Noir (2000), was produced by Marc Dorcel. Since then, she has directed a number of women-friendly videos for Marc Dorcel, Blue One, VCommunications, and Canal +. She is considered as a specialist of porn made by women, for women. Until 2005, she owned a sex shop that catered to women only. In May 2008, she started directing videos for the sex education channel FrenchLover TV. As of 12 March 2011, she was FrenchLover TV's Program Director. She also used to host a weekly talk show on the channel.

She left the company FrechLover TV in October 2015 to focus on her career as a journalist. She has worked for Radio France, Council of the European Union, France 2, and Canal +. She has also been a columnist for French newspaper Metronews since December 2012.

In 2002, she published her first book, Porno Manifesto, which she said she wrote because she was angry about the ignorance about pornography. She wrote 11 books, most of them about female sexuality (Osez découvrir le point G, La sexualité féminine de A à Z...), but also about pregnancy (Osez l'amour durant la grossesse), philosophy (Sexe Philo), and Punk Rock (Metal Urbain : a good hippie is a dead one). She said that she only studied philosophy so that she could understand porn; her 2012 book Sexe Philo was written in collaboration with philosophy Ph.D. Francis Métivier (fr).

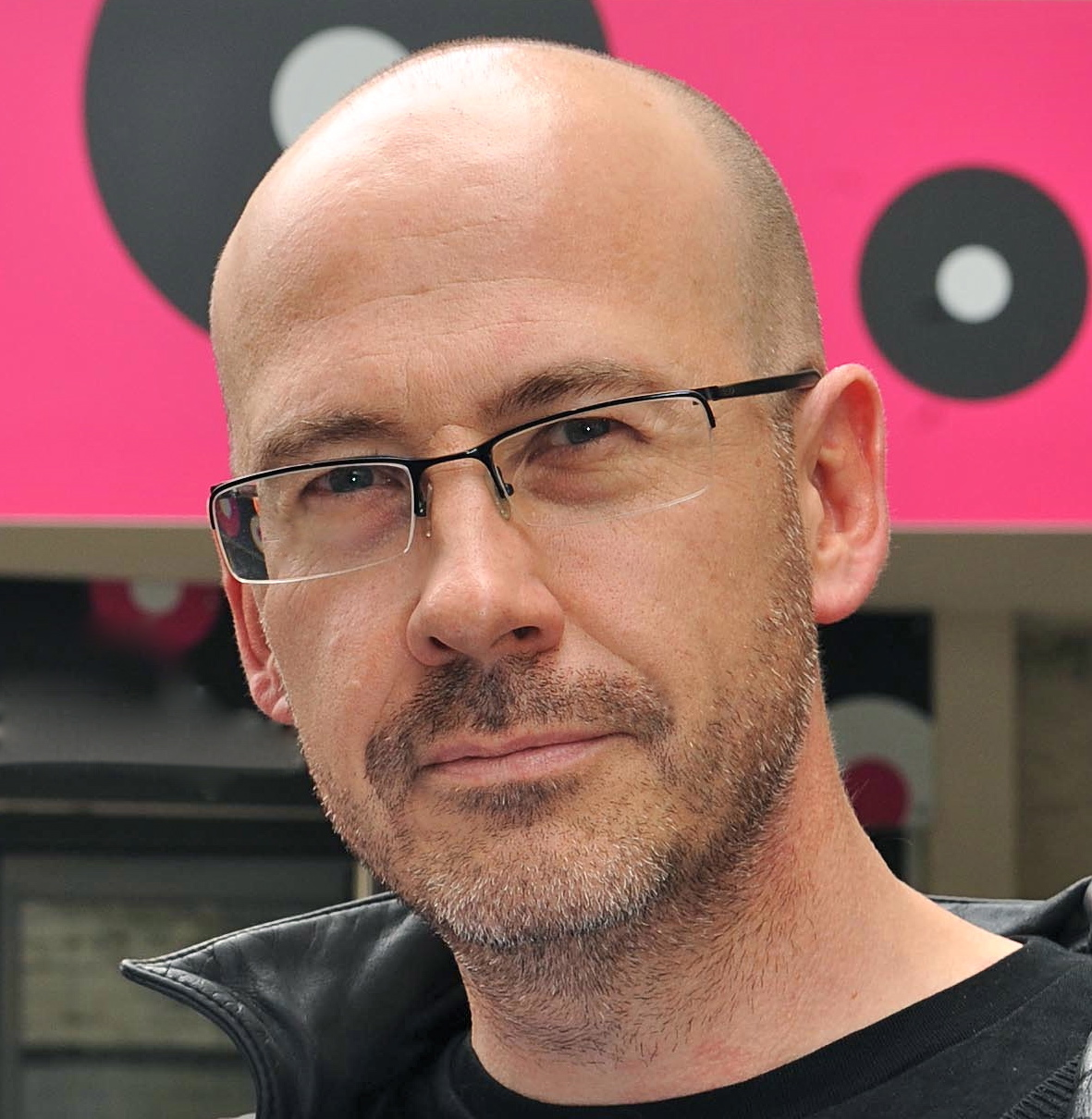
Francis Métivier

In 2006, she started writing and directing political documentaries. In November 2011, her movie Rhabillage, produced by French director Jean-Jacques Beineix, was aired on French national television France 2 with 6 million viewers. In 2015 she directed À quoi rêvent les jeunes filles ?, a documentary about the sexuality of millennials aired on France 2. Her 2018 documentary Là où les putains n'existent pas deals with the case of the murdered Swedish prostitute and activist Eva Marree Kullander Smith.

Ovidie is a devout vegan and a campaigner for animal rights.

== Filmography ==
Ovidie has appeared in mainstream movies, such as Mortel Transfert (2001) by Jean-Jacques Beineix and Le Pornographe (The Pornographer, 2001) by Bertrand Bonello. In the latter film, she performs an unsimulated sex scene.

She also appears in the 2005 Danish film All About Anna, produced by Lars von Trier's Zentropa, where she performed explicit and unsimulated oral sex on mainstream actress/singer Gry Bay; in a twist typical of Zentropa films, she is the only porn star in the film's cast, yet stands out as she does not appear nude in the film (only Gry Bay is undressed during their sex scene).

She also starred in the 2007 Jean Rollin film La nuit des horloges, and in 2014 she appeared in Saint-Amour, directed by Benoît Delépine and Gustave Kervern, with Benoît Poelvoorde and Gérard Depardieu.

Ovidie directed the 2017 documentary "Pornocracy: The New Sex Multinationals", about the transformation of the adult film industry into an oligopoly.

== Music ==
Ovidie has also been active in musical circles, organizing underground concerts within France for martial musicians such as Dernière Volonté, Position Parallèle, and others. In 2006, she directed 8 music videos for French electro punk band Metal Urbain. In 2009, Ovidie directed and performed in a music video by the German electronic rock/glam rock band The World Domination.

In 2012, she wrote, with French punk rocker Eric Debris, Metal Urbain: a good hippie is a dead one which has a preface by American punk rocker Jello Biafra.

== Titles and awards ==
During five years in the porn business, Ovidie appeared in more than 60 movies and received seven awards:

- Bruxelles 2001
- 2001 Hot d'Or Award - Hot d'Or d'honneur and Best Original Screenplay (Orgie en noir - writer)
- Bruxelles 2002
- 2002 Ninfa Award - Best Actress (Public)
- Bruxelles 2003
- 2004 European X Award nominee - Best Actress (France)
- 2009 Hot d'Or Honorary Award
- 2013 Feminist Porn Award - Movie of the Year
- 2014 Feminist Porn Award - Best Director

== Bibliography ==
- ——— (2002). Porno Manifesto (in French). Paris: Flammarion. ISBN 978-2-08-068344-1.
- ——— (2004). In Sex We Trust: Backstage (in French). Photographs by Hugo. Paris: La Musardine. ISBN 978-2-84271-202-0.
- ——— (2006). Osez… tourner votre film X [Dare to turn your movie… X] (in French). Paris: La Musardine. ISBN 978-2-84271-282-2.
- ——— (2007). Osez découvrir le point G [Dare to discover the G spot] (in French). Le Grand Livre du Mois. ISBN 978-2-286-03040-7.
- ——— (2007). Osez l'amour pendant la grossesse [Dare to love during pregnancy] (in French). La Musardine. ISBN 978-2-84271-298-3.
- ——— (2008). Osez les sextoys [Dare Sex Toys] (in French). La Musardine. ISBN 978-2-84271-275-4.
- ——— (2010). La sexualité féminine de A à Z [Female sexuality: A to Z] (in French). La Musardine. ISBN 978-2-84271-446-8.
- ——— (2012). Sexe Philo [Sex Philo] (in French). Editions Bréal. ISBN 978-2-7495-3103-8.
- ——— (Sep 2012). Metal Urbain : un bon hippie est un hippie mort [Metal Urbain : a good hippie is a dead one] (in French). Camion Blanc.
- ——— (2013). Histoires inavouables (in French). Editions Delcourt.
- ——— (2016). Osez être une maman sexy (in French). Editions La Musardine.
- ——— (2017). Libres ! Manifeste pour s'affranchir des diktats sexuels (in French). Éditions Delcourt.
- ——— (2024). Assise, debout, couchée ! (in French). Editions J.-C. Lattès.
