= Sodomites (film) =

- Written by: Gaspar Noé
- Directed by: Gaspar Noé
- Starring: Marc Barrow; Coralie Trinh Thi; Mano Solo
- Country of origin: France
- Original language: French

Production
- Running time: 7 minutes

Original release
- Release: 1998

Sodomites is a 1998 short film written and directed by Gaspar Noé. The film is a hardcore safe-sex promo that was made for French television in the late 1990s. Noé called the film "a bomb of energy" and has stated that it caused French censorship laws to change to the point where he could make Irréversible (2002) "with complete freedom".

== Cast ==
- Marc Barrow as the Rectal Beast
- Coralie Trinh Thi as Sodoma
- Mano Solo as the Master
- Philippe Nahon as a spectator
