= Coralie Trinh Thi =

French pornographic actress (born 1976)

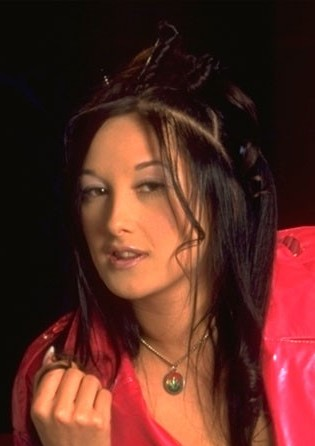
- Trinh Thi in 1998
- Born: 11 April 1976 (age 50); Paris, France
- Other names: Carolie, Corale, Coralie Gengenbach, Cora Lee, Coralie
- Height: 5 ft 7 in (1.70 m)

Coralie Trinh Thi (born 11 April 1976) is a French former pornographic actress, also known for writing and directing with Virginie Despentes the film Baise-moi (2000). During her career as a porn performer, she was generally just credited as Coralie. She won a Hot d'Or Award for Best European Actress in 1996, and she received a Hot d'Or Honorary Award in 2009.

She acted in the Gaspar Noé-directed short film Sodomites that was made as a safe-sex promo for French television in the late 1990s.

== Bibliography ==
- Trinh Thi, Coralie. La Voie Humide — Une Œuvre au Rouge. Vauvert: Au diable Vauvert, 2007. ISBN 978-2-84626-123-4
- Trinh Thi, Coralie. Osez... la sodomie. Paris: La Musardine, 2007. ISBN 978-2842712976
- Trinh Thi, Coralie. Betty Monde. Vauvert: Au diable Vauvert, 2002. ISBN 978-2-84626-037-4
