= Azazel (disambiguation) =

Azazel is a name possibly occurring in the book of Leviticus, and the subject of discussion in Rabbinic and Patristic literature.

Azazel may also refer to:

== Literature ==
- Azazel (Asimov), the subject of a short story collection and series by Isaac Asimov
- Azazel or The Winter Queen, a novel by Boris Akunin
- Azazel, a 2008 novel by Youssef Ziedan
- Azazel, a character in High School DxD

== Comics ==
- Azazel (DC Comics), a character created by Neil Gaiman and Sam Kieth
- Azazel (Marvel Comics), a character created by Chuck Austen
- Azazel, a character in the manga You're Being Summoned, Azazel

== Music ==
- Azazel: Book of Angels Volume 2, an album by the Masada String Trio

== Film and TV ==
- Azazel, a demon appearing in the 1998 film Fallen
- Azazel, an avenging angel in the ABC Family miniseries Fallen
- Azazel (Supernatural)
- Azazel (film), made-for-TV version of Boris Akunin's novel

== Video games ==
- Azazel (Tekken)
- Azazel, a character from the video game Helltaker
- Azazel, playable character from the video game The Binding of Isaac: Rebirth

== See also ==
- Azazeal, a character in the TV series Hex
- Azazello, a character in The Master and Margarita
