= Raffaëla Anderson =

French adult film performer

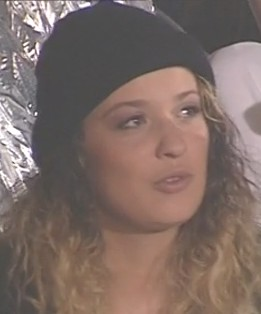
- Anderson in 1998
- Born: Malika Amrane; 8 January 1976 (age 50); Montfermeil, France
- Other names: Raphaëlla; Raphaëla; Rafaella Rizzi; Raphaela Anderson; Raphaella Anderson; Raffaela Rizzi
- Height: 5 ft 3 in (1.60 m)

Raffaëla Anderson (born Malika Amrane on 8 January 1976) is a French former adult film performer. During her porn career, she was often credited as Raphaëlla (also spelled Raphaëla).

== Career ==
Anderson studied to be a secretary. She entered the French pornography business in 1994 at the age of 18 and left it four years later. Still a virgin at that time, she had her first sexual intercourse with a porn actor on a film set. During her adult film career, she was raped by two men who had recognized her. Her aggressors were identified but, according to her own account, the public prosecutor told her that she was "the product of a bad upbringing" and that, being a porn actress, she should not be complaining.

Anderson played Manu in the 2000 film, Baise-moi, an explicit French film about two women embarking on a journey of sex and murderous violence. Time magazine reviewed the film and said, "And as one of the amoral avengers, Raffaela Anderson has true star quality...." In the 2001 mainstream film, Amour de Femme, she played a dance instructor who falls in love with a married woman.

In 2005, she participated, along with nine other current or former adult film performers, in the documentary Une vie classée X from Mireille Darc for the French TV channel France 3. She related how she lost her virginity on camera, spoke of her family and background, and of the violence she suffered or witnessed in the porn industry. She also mentioned cocaine and alcohol abuse during episodes of depression after leaving the pornography business.

Anderson wrote a book, titled Hard, describing her experiences in the porn industry and decrying its abuses. In the documentary film La Petite Morte she voiced many of the same criticisms. In 2006, she published Tendre violence, a narration of her childhood with her Muslim family in Gagny.

== Filmography ==
- Baise-moi (2000)
- Un amour de femme (2001) (TV-movie)
- La petite morte (2003) (documentary)

== Selected works ==
- Hard (2001)
- Tendre Violence (2006)

== Sources ==
- Hard, 2001 – Grasset Ed. – ISBN 2-246-61511-9
- Tendre violence, 2006 – Jean-Claude Lattès Ed. – ISBN 2-7096-2828-7
