= Tabatha Cash =

French former pornographic actress (born 1973)

- Born: Celine Barbe; 27 December 1973 (age 52); Saint-Denis, France
- Other names: Lydia Celine, Tabatha, Celine Lydie, Tabatah Cash, Celyne Lidie, Celine, Tabitha Cash, Ce'line, Ce'line Duval, Lydia Ce'line, Tabetha Cash, Celine Duval, Celine Lydye
- Education: law school
- Height: 5 ft 7 in (1.70 m)
- Spouse: Frank Vardon (1993-2014, his death)

Tabatha Cash (born 27 December 1973) is a French former pornographic actress and currently the editor in chief of France's Hot Vidéo magazine as well as the head of the Hot Video group.

== Career ==
Cash quit school at 15 in Paris and entered the porn industry in 1992. In May 1993 Cash won a Hot D'Or for Best European Starlet (roughly the equivalent to the AVN Best New Starlet award) during the International Film Festival in Cannes. The following year she won Best European Actress at the Hot d'Or ceremony. Although according to the Internet Adult Film Database (IAFD) she performed in her last video in 1994, videos that include her appearances have continued to be released steadily.

=== Appearances ===
Outside pornography, she has worked as a presenter on SkyRock Radio in France, and starred in the mainstream movie, Raï, playing the central female character, a young Algerian woman. She was also on French national TV Canal+, and her face and figure have been seen on the cover of magazines such as Elle, Cosmopolitan, Glamour and GQ. Cash was also featured in the 1995 calendar of the magazine Max.

=== Publishing ===
In July 2014, after the death of her husband and Hot Video group owner Frank Vardon in January, Cash took control of the Hot Video group and its five branches which includes its magazine and media operations. She is also the editor in chief of the magazine. This was announced via a contest in the magazine that culminated with a cover spread and article about its new editor.

== Personal life ==
Cash was romantically involved with far-right political activist Serge Ayoub in the 1990s. At age 20, Cash married Franck Vardon, editor of Hot Vidéo, and settled down to be a stay-at-home mom.

== Awards ==
- 1993, Hot d'Or, Best European Starlet
- 1994, Hot d'Or, Best European Actress
