= Eva Marree Kullander Smith =

Sex workers' rights activist (1986–2013)

- Born: 17 April 1986
- Died: 11 July 2013 (aged 27); Västerås, Sweden
- Cause of death: Murder
- Other names: Petite Jasmine
- Occupation: Sex workers' rights activist
- Children: 2

Eva Marree Kullander Smith (17 April 1986 – 11 July 2013), also known as Petite Jasmine, was a Swedish woman who lost custody of her two children to her abusive ex-boyfriend when authorities learned about her job as an escort girl which she only practiced for two weeks. She then became a sex workers' rights activist. She was murdered in 2013 by her ex-boyfriend, leading to protests by sex worker support groups around the world.

== The case ==
Eva Marree Kullander Smith, also known by her work name of Petite Jasmine, became an activist after experiencing discrimination from social services and society at large in relation to her work as a sex worker.

She had met just a handful of clients when she told her cousin about her new job, but the cousin informed social services as well as the abusive ex-partner of Kullander Smith. Days later, social services came to the apartment of Kullander Smith and announced that the children were being removed. A witness testified to the children crying as they were taken from their mother and they were later placed with their father who began to pursue custody after learning that Kullander Smith had done sex work. During court hearings, the father of the children openly bragged about the fact he was friends with social services employees involved in handling the case.

The court hearings focused on whether Kullander Smith was still engaging in sex work, speculations about how her ex-partner felt about this, and what this might mean in regards to suitability for custody rights. According to some witnesses, the actual reality of the situation in terms of the impacts selling sexual services might or might not have were not meaningfully considered or even given an opportunity to be considered. To make matters worse, the court spent little to no time considering the gravity of the charges against the father of the children, or the fact that Kullander Smith had never actually been found to have put the children at risk or harmed them. The only allegations that were made against Kullander Smith were from her abusive ex-partner (the father), and even those accusations were dropped by the time the last court hearing occurred.

Kullander Smith became an activist and a board member of the Swedish sex worker rights organization Rose Alliance, arguing against the stigmatization of prostitutes. She had no criminal record, and the reports from social workers that had seen her with the children all spoke highly of her commitment and dedication to parenting and the good rapport she had with her children.

In contrast, the father of the children had a substantial criminal record, for charges ranging from narcotics offenses to interpersonal violence. Kullander Smith had in fact already left the father of the two children while pregnant with their second child due to domestic violence. The criminal record for the father of the children also included assault charges against a girlfriend prior to Kullander Smith as well as a sentence for making death threats towards a security guard and two arresting officers. The latter had been settled in court only months prior to the children being taken from Kullander Smith and placed in his custody. Despite this, the court decided to award the father with custody and grant Kullander Smith only limited visitation rights, with a note specifying that the order should be revisited in the case of the father failing to follow orders. When the orders were not followed, the arrangement was not reconsidered though. Instead, when it came to court, it was decided that the children should remain with their father to minimize disruption as they had lost contact with their mother. However, the sole reason for this loss of contact over a prolonged period of time was the father's actions in failing to allow visitation sessions to occur. The court ordered that Kullander Smith be granted supervised visitation sessions of gradually increasing increments, and that the sessions should take place at social services with transportation provided to and from the venue for Kullander Smith so as to ensure her safety.

When Kullander Smith wanted to see her son on 11 July 2013 at a social service station in Västerås as her second visitation, social services failed to provide transportation, and she ended up on the same bus as her abusive ex-partner and the kids. By the time they reached the venue for the visitation session, Kullander Smith and her ex-partner were both upset. Some staff at the venue took the father to the kitchen and another social worker went outside with Kullander Smith. But the social services venue had failed to secure the knives in the kitchen, which meant that the father was able to help himself to the eventual murder weapon and proceed to run outside and stab Kullander Smith to death. The social worker sitting by her side was seriously injured as well.

Despite mandate obligations requiring social services to report such incidents for review and investigation, the social services in this case have still failed to self-report the incident. This issue has been raised by GREVIO to no avail.

== Aftermath ==
In the aftermath of Kullander Smith's murder and the murder of Dora Özer, a transgender Turkish prostitute that occurred at around the same time, protests by sex worker support groups took place in front of Swedish and Turkish embassies in 36 cities on four continents.

In November 2013, her 31-year-old ex-boyfriend Joel Kabagambe was sentenced to 18 years in prison for murder and attempted murder. The defense had argued that an ill-medicated personality disorder contributed to the deed.

The Rose Alliance subsequently created the Jasmine Prize in Kullander Smith's memory, an annual award given to individuals "who actively contribute to improve the rights of sex workers and who work against stigma, discrimination and violence." The 2018 French documentary film Là où les putains n'existent pas ("Where hookers don't exist") describes her case with interviews of her mother, her lawyer and footage of her activism. The film ends with the statement that to this day Kullander Smith's mother has not been allowed to meet the children and does not know where they live.
