= Andrew Blake (director) =

American adult film director

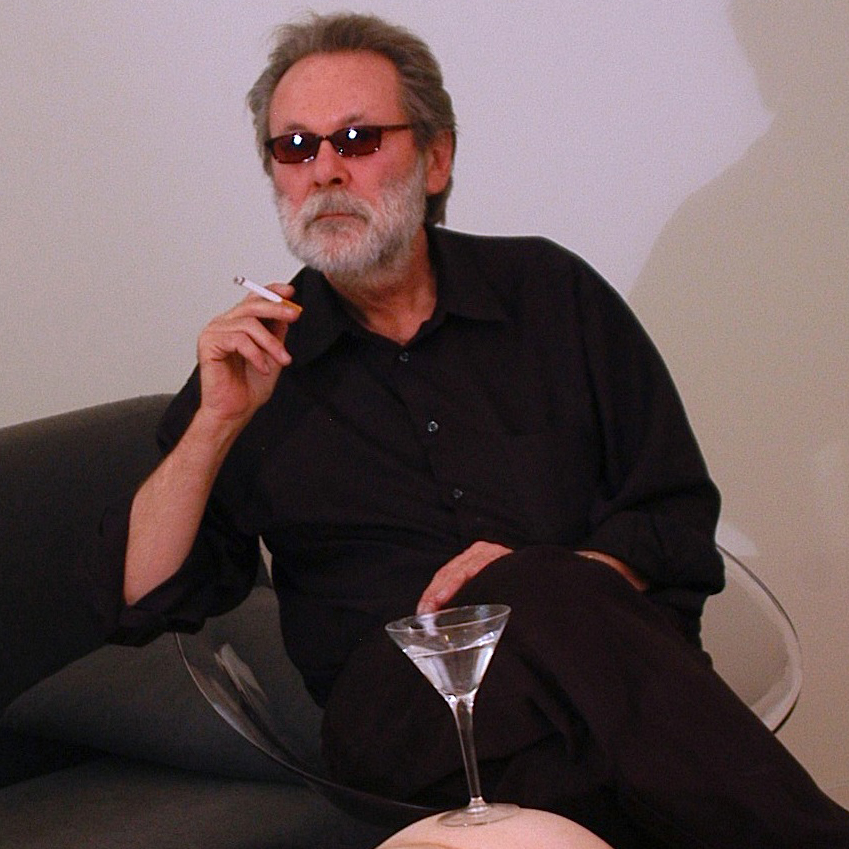
- Blake in 2007
- Born: 1948 (age 77–78)
- Occupations: Film director and cinematographer
- Years active: 1989–Present
- Known for: Adult erotic films
- Website: http://www.andrewblake.com

Andrew Blake (born 1948) is an American adult erotic film director and film producer. Blake has been inducted into both the AVN and XRCO Halls of Fame and is a medal recipient from the Worldfest-Houston International Film Festival for his first film NIGHT TRIPS.

== Biography ==
Andrew Blake began his career working on movies for Playboy, and then for Penthouse but shifted to working independently in the 1990s. Most of Blake's films are released through his own production company, Studio A Entertainment. Andrew Blake is a member of the AVN Hall of Fame (200?) and XRCO Hall of Fame (2003). Blake's films usually feature original music scores by the composer Raoul Valve.

Blake has described his work as "erotic fashion," and his films usually include fetish, bondage, and lesbian imagery, often excluding heterosexual intercourse entirely. Blake's earliest films were primarily works of softcore erotica. Early films made by Blake soon after he came into his own as an independent director are fully explicit and usually combine heterosexual intercourse with lesbian imagery while including much less fetish and bondage content than his later films.

An interview with Blake is included in the 9 to 5 – Days in Porn (2009) documentary film about the American porn industry.

== Reception ==
Blake's first major film, Night Trips, (1989), was awarded the silver medal in the Non-Theatrical Release Category at the Worldfest-Houston International Film Festival. Andrew Blake holds the distinction of being the first adult director to win a film award at a mainstream international film festival.

Blake's films are characterized by high production values, artistic stylization, and rigorous technique. His style has been compared to that of the seminal fashion photographer Helmut Newton, and described as "decadent, lush, opulent, unfailingly arousing, moneyed and sophisticated."

Sex writer Violet Blue says of Blake's work: "It's a whole different genre of explicit erotic filmmaking evident from the first frame -- pure high fashion, glossy candyland fantasy. It is luxuriously designed from nip tip to toe. And it's stylish as hell."

== Pop culture ==
Blake has had a significant impact on pop film culture. Blake was the first adult director to win a crossover award with Night Trips filmed in 1989, which won the Silver Award Non-Theatrical Release at the WorldFest-Houston International Film Festival. Blake featured Dita Von Teese in a 1999 full-length feature film, Pin-Ups 2, which portrayed her as a pin-up girl and highlighted her interest in the fetish and kink lifestyle, and the following year in his 2000 film, Decadence, further popularizing her career as a world-leading fetish burlesque star.

== Awards (selected) ==
- 1999 AVN Award "Best All-Sex, Film" (High-Heels)
- 2000 AVN Award "Best All-Sex Film" (Playthings)
- 2002 AVN Award "Best Art Direction Film" (Blond & Brunettes)
- 2002 AVN Award "Best Cinematography" (Blond & Brunettes)
- 2002 Venus Award "Best Director USA"
- 2004 AVN Award "Best All Sex Film" (Hard Edge)
- 2004 AVN Award "Best Art Direction Film" (Hard Edge)
- 2004 AVN Award "Best Cinematography" (Hard Edge)
- 2004 AVN Award "Best Editing Film" (Hard Edge)
- 2005 AVN Award "Best Cinematography" (Flirts)
- 2008 AVN Award "Best Editing" (X)
- 2009 AVN Award "Best Cinematography" (Paid Companions)
- 2010 XBIZ Award "Excellence in Progressive Erotica"
- 2011 XBIZ Award "Best Editing" (Voyeur Within)
- 2013 AVN Award "Best Photography Website" (AndrewBlake.com)
- 2014 AVN Award "Best Glamour Website" (AndrewBlake.com)

== Filmography (selected) ==
- 1989 Playboy: Video Playmate Calendar 1989
- 1988 Playboy: Sexy Lingerie
- 1989 Playboy: Sexy Lingerie
- 1989 Playboy: Wet & Wild
- 1989 Night Trips
- 1990 Art of Desire (Desire)
- 1990 House of Dreams
- 1990 Night Trips 2
- 1990 Secrets
- 1990 Playboy: Video Playmate Calendar 1991
- 1990 Playboy: The Best Of Sexy Lingerie 2
- 1991 Playboy: Sexy Lingerie 3
- 1991 Penthouse: Pet Of The Year Play-Off 1991
- 1992 Penthouse: Satin & Lace
- 1992 Hidden Obsessions
- 1993 Penthouse: Satin & Lace II: Hollywood Undercover
- 1993 Penthouse: Pet Of The Year Play-Off 1993
- 1993 Girls Of Penthouse 2
- 1993 Les Femmes Erotiques
- 1993 Sensual Exposure
- 1994 Fantasy Women
- 1994 Private Property
- 1994 Penthouse: Pet Of The Year Play-Off 1994
- 1995 Sex And Money
- 1995 Captured Beauty
- 1995 Penthouse: Pet Of The Year Play-Off 1995
- 1995 Playboy: The Best Of Pamela Anderson
- 1996 Miami Hot Talk
- 1996 Unleashed
- 1997 Venus Descending (Penthouse)
- 1997 Dark Angel
- 1997 Paris Chic
- 1997 Possessions
- 1998 Delirious
- 1998 High Heels
- 1998 Wet
- 1999 Pin-Ups a.k.a. Andrew Blake's Pin-Ups
- 1999 Pin-Ups 2 a.k.a. Andrew Blake's Pin-Ups 2
- 1999 Aroused
- 1999 Pin-ups 1
- 1999 Pin-ups 2
- 1999 Playthings
- 2000 Andrew Blake 2000 Part 1
- 2000 Decadence
- 2000 Secret Paris
- 2000 Amy And Julie Penthouse
- 2001 Bizarre Woman
- 2001 Linn Thomas Featurette Aria (Visual Stimulations)
- 2001 Blond and Brunettes
- 2001 Exhibitionists
- 2002 Girlfriends
- 2002 Justine
- 2002 The Villa
- 2003 Adriana
- 2003 Dollhouse
- 2003 Hard Edge
- 2003 Naked Diva
- 2004 Close-ups
- 2004 Feel The Heat
- 2004 Flirts
- 2005 Body Language
- 2005 Teasers
- 2005 Teasers 2
- 2006 Sultry - A Carnal Compilation
- 2006 Valentina
- 2007 Andrew Blake X 1
- 2007 Andrew Blake X 2
- 2008 House Pets
- 2008 Night Trips A Dark Odyssey
- 2008 Paid Companions
- 2009 Smoking hot girls
- 2009 High strung women
- 2009 Voyeur Within
- 2010 Sex Dolls
- 2011 Five Stars 1
- 2011 Five Stars 2
- 2012 Lipstick and lace
- 2013 Sexy girls

(2010)

== See also ==
- Michael Ninn
- Helmut Newton
- Philip Mond
- Radley Metzger
- Tinto Brass
