= Hot Vidéo =

French trade journal covering the adult video industry

Hot Videos
- Categories: Trade Journal
- Frequency: Monthly
- Founded: 1989
- Country: France
- Language: French

Hot Vidéo is a French trade journal that covers the adult video industry. It was founded in June 1989 by Frank Vardon and Gilles Bot. It is now part of VCV Communications. Its average circulation date to 2011 is about 50,000 copies per month, while in the 1990s it was about 100,000 copies. Its staff include professional journalists previously committed to other news fields.

Tabitha Cash is the editor in chief and oversees the Hot Video group which consists of five divisions: magazine, TV, web, mobile and VOD.

== Origin and history ==
Vardon worked for Hachette Filipacchi Media before launching his first publication in 1985 the adult magazine Projexion Privée. In 1989, he started Hot Video Magazine. His concept was to mix hardcore pictures with news and coverage of the adult industry from around the world, North and South America, Europe, and the far East. Hot Video became the most sold adult magazines in Europe.

Between 2010 and 2012, Hot Video was involved in a controversy with National Federation of firefighters of France (FNSPF), that accused the magazine of defamation and insult in relation to an article entitled "Tell-All Investigation Of Sex And Firefighters" ("Enquête vérité sur le sexe et les pompiers"). The case was finally dismissed in court.

== Operations ==
In May 2008, the company announced the launch of its first website dedicated to the adult industry in Europe and around the world. The site contains a variety of areas for news and industry information as well as videos and access to the Hot Video and HNN archives, and the X-rated series Q, The Series.

In January 2014 Hot Video group owner Frank Vardon died. In July of the same year, it was announced that former adult film actress and wife of Vardon, Tabitha Cash, was in control of the Hot Video group and its five branches which includes its magazine and media operations after the death of Vardon. A new management team was also announced which included Celine Vardon as shareholder, Jean-Charles Chaigne as president (replacing Gilles Bot), and Sebastien Ollinger as general manager.

=== Award and trade show programs ===
Owner and editor Vardon used the resources of the magazine to found and launch the Hot d'Or ("Golden Hot"; allusion to Palme d'or) awards, which had its inaugural show during the Cannes Film Festival in 1992. The ceremony showcased the best in adult video worldwide. The award program and show was discontinued in 2001, though in 2009 it was brought back for one year to celebrate the 20th anniversary of the founding of the magazine. The magazine was also the sponsor of the Salon de la Video Hot trade fair in Paris in 1996; the first two editions attracted over 70,000 visitors.
