= Marc Dorcel =

French producer and director of pornographic films (born 1934)

- Born: Marcel Herskovitz; 27 March 1934 (age 92)
- Occupations: Producer, director and founder of Video Marc Dorcel
- Years active: 1965–present
- Children: 1

Dorcel
- Type: Private
- Industry: Adult erotic films
- Genre: Pornography
- Headquarters: France
- Area served: Worldwide
- Products: Pornographic films
- Website: Official website

Marc Dorcel (French pronunciation: [maʁk dɔʁsɛl]; born in March 1934 as Marcel Herskovitz) is a French-Hungarian producer of adult erotic films who founded the company Video Marc Dorcel (or simply Marc Dorcel). Besides producing films by himself, he also produces films in partnership with people like Michel Ricaud, Cyril Randuineau, Marc Ange and Julo Kaiel. Dorcel is known for the long-running Pornochic film series. Dorcel was inducted into the AVN Hall of Fame in 2015.

In the 1990s, Marc Dorcel became the first French porn producer to employ actresses under exclusivity contracts. Dorcel's first brand ambassador, in the late 1990s, was Laure Sainclair, followed by other female performers such as Mélanie Coste and Yasmine Lafitte.

== 3D/360° films ==
Dorcel is a pioneer in producing 3D/360° films.

== Distribution deals ==
The company's films are distributed in the U.S. by Wicked Pictures.

On 1 March 2006, Dorcel launched Dorcel TV, a cable and satellite service broadcasting adult films. Dorcel TV is also available online. Video Marc Dorcel has also expanded to include a range of gay erotic content.

In August 2008, Private Media Group announced it has established an alliance with Video Marc Dorcel to collaborate in the home video market. The collaboration starts with a three-year DVD distribution agreement for France and going forward it is expected that Private and Marc Dorcel will explore additional opportunities in other territories. It is also expected that Private and Marc Dorcel will join forces on distribution platforms including Internet and IPTV/VOD in both France and across the EU.

The studio's content is also available online through archos.com.

In October 2017, Marc Dorcel has partnered with Canada's Vanessa Media to launch a TV channel and VOD service in Canada in French and English language.

== Awards ==
Video Marc Dorcel has been nominated for AVN Awards on many occasions. The following is a selection of some of the major adult erotic awards won by Dorcel personally or by his company:

- 1995 AVN Award – Best American Release in Europe (The Hot Video Award) for Le Parfum de Mathilde
- 1995 Hot d'Or Award – Best European Director (Citizen Shane)
- 1996 Hot d'Or Awards – Best European Director, Best European Film and Best Remake or Adaptation, all for La Princesse et La Pute – The Princess and The Whore)
- 1998 AVN Award – Best American Release in Europe (The Hot Video Award) for President by Day, Hooker by Night
- 1998 Hot d'Or d'Honneur for special achievements in the European adult industry
- 1999 AVN Award – Best American Release in Europe (The Hot Video Award) for Drop Sex: Wipe The Floor
- 1999 Hot d'Or Award – Best European Movie (L'enjeu du desir)
- 2001 AVN Award – Best American Release in Europe (The Hot Video Award) for Tell Me What You Want
- 2001 Venus Award – French National Prize
- 2001 FICEB Ninfa Award – Lifetime Achievement Award
- 2002 AVN Award – Best American Release in Europe (The Hot Video Award) for Dark Angels
- 2008 Eroticline Award – Special Award for Outstanding Achievements
- 2009 Hot d'Or Award – Best French Film (Ritual – Marc Dorcel/Wicked Pictures)
- 2011 XBIZ Award – European Studio of the Year
- 2012 XBIZ Award – European Studio of the Year
- 2012 XBIZ Award – European Feature Release of the Year (Les Filles de la Campagne)
- 2013 XBIZ Award – Parody Release of the Year, Drama (Inglorious Bitches)
- 2013 XBIZ Award – European Studio of the Year
- 2013 XBIZ Award – European Feature Release of the Year (Inglorious Bitches)
- 2014 XBIZ Award – European Studio of the Year
- 2014 XBIZ Award – Specialty Release of the Year
- 2014 XBIZ Award – European Feature Release of the Year (Claire Castel, The Chambermaid)
- 2014 AVN Award – Best Foreign Feature (L’Innocente)
- 2015 XBIZ Award – European Studio of the Year
- 2015 XBIZ Award – European Feature Release of the Year (Russian Institute: Lesson 19: Holidays at My Parents)
- 2015 AVN Hall of Fame
- 2017 XBIZ Award – Foreign Studio of the Year
- 2017 XBIZ Award – Foreign Feature Release of the Year (My Daughter Is A Whore – Marc Dorcel/Wicked Pictures)
- 2018 XBIZ Europa Award – Feature Movie of the Year (Undercover)
- 2018 XBIZ Europa Award – Glamcore Movie of the Year (Luxure: Wife to Educate)
- 2018 XBIZ Europa Award – Studio of the Year
- 2019 XBIZ Award – Foreign Studio of the Year
- 2019 XBIZ Europa Award – Glamcore Movie of the Year (Clea, Private Banker)
- 2019 XBIZ Europa Award – Studio of the Year
