= Amy Scholder =

American editor and filmmaker

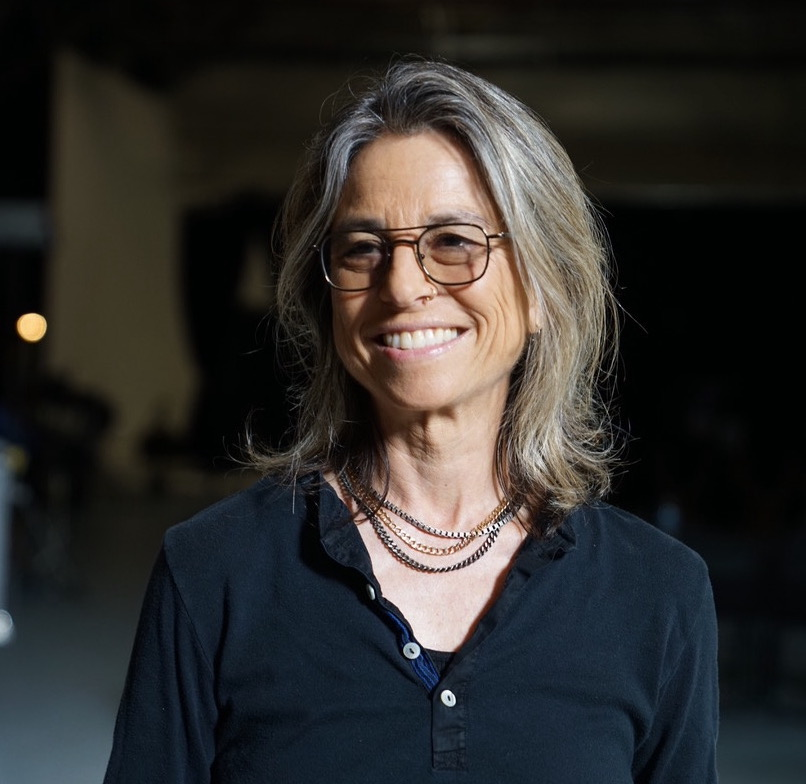
- Amy Scholder on location with the documentary Disclosure, Los Angeles, California, 2019
- Born: 24 September 1963 (age 62); San Francisco
- Education: University of California, Berkeley
- Occupations: Literary Editor and documentary filmmaker
- Writing career
- Years active: 1985–present
- Notable awards: GLAAD Media Award

Amy Scholder is an American literary editor and documentary filmmaker known for publishing works by marginalized and especially LGBTQ writers, artists, musicians, and activists.

== Biography ==
=== Early years ===
Born in San Francisco, Scholder grew up in the San Fernando Valley in Los Angeles, California. She attended Tufts University for two years, then graduated with a Bachelor of Arts degree in English literature from University of California, Berkeley.

=== Career ===
==== City Lights Books ====
Scholder began her career as an editor at City Lights Books in San Francisco in 1985. She added to its list by publishing books by Karen Finley, Gil Cuadros, Rebecca Brown, Leslie Dick, Carla Harryman, Marguerite Duras, George Bataille, and Laure (Colette Peignot). While at City Lights, she also created an imprint of books for the nonprofit ArtSpace in San Francisco, publishing books by author-artists David Wojnarowicz , Dennis Cooper, and Nayland Blake.

==== High Risk Books ====
In 1991 she edited, with Ira Silverberg, the anthology High Risk: Writing on Sex, Death, and Subversion (Dutton and Plume) which collected transgressive writing in the midst of the AIDS crisis, regardless of genre. Another volume followed in 1994. Among the writers included in High Risk are Karen Finley, Essex Hemphill, Kathy Acker, David Wojnarowicz, Mary Gaitskill, William S. Burroughs, Dorothy Allison, Dennis Cooper, Ana Maria Simo, Darryl Pinckney, Akilah Nayo Oliver, Darius James, Lynne Tillman, Craig G. Harris, Rikki Ducornet, John Giorno, John Preston, Diamanda Galas, Cookie Mueller, Gil Cuadros, Kate Bornstein, Wanda Coleman, and Manuel Ramos Otero. Speaking to BOMB Magazine in 1991, Scholder described the High Risk anythology saying:

The fact that this book is not all one thing is what’s interesting—that this is not a lesbian and gay anthology, and that this is not a heterosexual anthology, it’s not all white, it’s not all fiction. What became the constant was the fact that each work challenges something, is radical, either from within or without. That’s what we’re looking for, but that’s very loose and so it does make sitting down and reading this anthology a little difficult perhaps. We’re trying to broaden the base because we’re not so interested in whether we’re homo or heterosexual but rather what’s radical and what isn’t. The point is to suggest a new idea of community. It’s so much more challenging intellectually.

— "Ira Silverberg and Amy Scholder", BOMB Magazine

Scholder moved to New York City in 1995 when Serpent’s Tail, an independent literary publisher in the UK, offered Scholder and Silverberg a US imprint which they named High Risk Books. They published a list of mostly paperback originals designed by artist Rex Ray. Authors include Sapphire, Cookie Mueller, Gary Indiana, John Giorno, Heather Lewis, Lynne Tillman, Kate Bornstein, Diamanda Galas, Hervé Guibert, Ann Rower, Mary Woronov, and June Jordan. Scholder edited books for High Risk and Serpent's Tail until 2004

==== Independent ====
As an independent editor, she also edited the diaries (In the Shadow of the American Dream) and short fiction (The Waterfront Journals) of David Wojnarowicz for Grove Press; selected writings (Essential Acker) and short fiction (Rip-Off Red, Girl Detective) by Kathy Acker for Grove Press; and a book of poetry by Joni Mitchell for Crown.

==== Verso Books ====
Scholder began editing books for Verso in 1999, and became their US publisher in 2005, where she acquired books by Laura Flanders, Judith Butler, Kate Millett, and Valerie Solanas, whose SCUM Manifesto was reprinted with an essay by Avital Ronell.

==== Seven Stories Press ====
She left to join Seven Stories Press as editor-in-chief in 2006, and acquired books by Coco Fusco, Ulrike Meinhof, Elfriede Jelinek, Annie Ernaux, Savannah Knoop, Douglas Martin, and hattie gossett.

==== The Feminist Press ====
In 2008, Scholder left Seven Stories to become the executive editor of the Feminist Press at the City University of New York. There she rebranded the organization to address contemporary feminist issues and sensibility, such as Pussy Riot!: A Punk Prayer for Freedom, "a collection of letters, songs, poems, courtroom statements, and tributes" pertaining to the jailed members of Russian performance art group, Pussy Riot. During Scholder's tenure at Feminist Press, Rahna Reiko Rizzuto's Hiroshima in the Morning was a finalist for the National Book Critics Circle Award; Virginie Despentes′ King Kong Theory, Justin Vivian Bond′s Tango: My Life Backwards and in High Heels, Barbara Hammer′s Hammer: Making Movies Out of Sex and Love, and Ana Castillo′s Give It to Me all won Lambda Literary awards. Other works published by Scholder include the translation of Paul B. Preciado's Testo Junkie into English, a previously unpublished novel, Savage Coast, by Muriel Rukeyser, and books by June Jordan, Karen Finley and Laurie Weeks.

==== Documentary Filmmaking ====
In 2015, Scholder left the Feminist Press and returned to Los Angeles. She produced with Sam Feder the documentary feature film Disclosure, which premiered at the 2020 Sundance FilmFestival and was released as a Netflix Original in June 2020. Disclosure was nominated for a Peabody Award and earned a GLAAD Media Award for Outstanding Documentary; PinkNews award; a Global Mental Health Programs/Columbia University award; and a Women's eNews award for Groundbreaking Film of the Year.

After she co-edited the collection of works by controversial feminist Andrea Dworkin, Last Days at Hot Slit: The Radical Feminism of Andrea Dworkin (Semiotexte, 2019) with Johanna Fatemen, Scholder was approached by director Pratibha Parmar and producer Shaheen Haq to help them finish their hybrid documentary feature film My Name Is Andrea, about Dworkin. She became an executive producer of the film, which premiered at the 2022 Tribeca Film Festival.

==== Back at City Lights ====
After rejoining City Lights as an editor-at-large in 2016, Scholder edited Pamela Sneed’s Funeral Diva, which won the 2020 Lambda Literary Award for Lesbian Poetry; Steven Reigns′ A Quilt for David; Kate Braverman’s A Good Day for Seppuku; Jewelle Gomez′s The Gilda Stories; and the 25th anniversary edition of Karen Finley′s Shock Treatment.

She joined the Board of Directors of the City Lights Foundation in 2020 and previously served on the Board of Directors of Lambda Literary (2014-2020).

== Selected bibliography as editor ==
- Story of the Eye by George Bataille (1987) ISBN 9780872862098
- Duras by Duras by Marguerite Duras (1987)
- Shock Treatment by Karen Finley (1990, 2015) ISBN 9780872866911
- High Risk (anthology) Edited by Amy Scholder & Ira Silverberg (1991) ISBN 0525249664
- The Terrible Girls by Rebecca Brown (1992) ISBN 9780872862661
- To the Friend Who Did Not Save My Life by Herve Guibert (1994) ISBN 9781635901238
- You Got to Burn to Shine by John Giorno (1994) ISBN 9781852423216
- Rent Boy by Gary Indiana (1994) ISBN 9781946022523
- Haruko/Love Poems by June Jordan (1994) ISBN 9781852423230
- American Dreams by Sapphire (1994) ISBN 9780679767992
- Ghost of Chance by William S. Burroughs (1995) ISBN 9781852424060
- The Shit of God by Diamanda Galas (1996) ISBN 9781852424329
- Break It Down by Lydia Davis (1996) ISBN 9781852424213
- Bodies of Work by Kathy Acker (1997) ISBN 1852424850
- Joni Mitchell's The Complete Poems and Lyrics (1997) ISBN 0609600087
- Haunted Houses by Lynne Tillman (1995) ISBN 978-1852424008
- Flaming Creature: The Life and Time of Jack Smith, Artist, Performer, Exotic Consultant (1997) ISBN 9781852424299
- In the Shadow of the American Dream by David Wojnarowicz (1999) ISBN 9780802116321
- House Rules by Heather Lewis (2005) ISBN 9781852424138
- Swimming Underground by Mary Woronov (2000) ISBN 1852427191
- Mother Millett by Kate Millett (2001) ISBN 1859846076
- Imagining Her Erotics by Carolee Schneemann (2002) ISBN 0262194597
- David Bowie Live in New York (2003) ISBN 1576871819
- Precarious Life by Judith Butler (2004) ISBN 1844670058
- Bushwomen by Laura Flanders (2004) ISBN 1859845878
- Street Wars by Tom Hayden (2004) ISBN 1565848764
- SCUM Manifesto by Valerie Solanas, with a foreword by Avital Ronell (2004) ISBN 1859845533
- Greed by Elfriede Jelinek (2007) ISBN 9781846686665
- Flying Close to the Sun by Cathy Wilkerson (2007) ISBN 9781583227718
- Everybody Talks About the Weather by Ulrike Meinhof (2008) ISBN 9781583228319
- A Field Guide for Female Interrogators by Coco Fusco (2008) ISBN 9781583227800
- Hammer by Barbara Hammer(2010) ISBN 9781558616127
- Witches Midwives & Nurses by Barbara Ehrenreich & Deirdre English (2010) ISBN 9781558616615
- King Kong Theory by Virginie Despentes (2010) ISBN 9781558616578
- Tango by Justin Vivian Bond (2011) ISBN 9781558617476
- Testo Junkie by Paul B. Preciado (2013) ISBN 9781558618374
- The Riot Grrrl Collection by Lisa Darms and Johanna Fateman (2013) ISBN 9781558618220
- Pussy Riot! by Pussy Riot (2013) ISBN 9781558618343
- Savage Coast by Muriel Rukeyser (2013) ISBN 9781558618206
- Give It to Me by Ana Castillo (2014) ISBN 9781558618503
- What the Flowers Say by George Sand (2014) ISBN 9781558618572
- The Cosmopolitans by Sarah Schulman (2015) ISBN 9781558619104
- The Gilda Stories by Jewelle Gomez (1991, 2016) ISBN 9780872866744
- After Silence by Avram Finkelstein (2018) ISBN 9780520295148
- A Good Day for Seppuku by Kate Braverman (2018) ISBN 9780872867215
- Funeral Diva by Pamela Sneed (2020) ISBN 9780872868113
- A Quilt for David by Steven Reigns (2021) ISBN 9780872868816
- Walking Through Clear Water in a Pool Painted Black by Cookie Mueller, edited by Hedi El Kholti, Chris Kraus, Amy Scholder (2022) ISBN 9781635901665
