= High Risk Books =

Book publisher based in New York City, U.S.

High Risk Books was a book publisher, founded in New York City in 1993 as an imprint of Serpent's Tail Press of London. It was started by Ira Silverberg and Amy Scholder who was then an editor at City Lights Books in San Francisco. Its titles were designed by Rex Ray.

High Risk Books was dedicated to publishing innovative, provocative, and progressive literature. The publishing firm was united by its concern for certain subversive impulses, and in this spirit printed authors as diverse as William S. Burroughs, Tim Dlugos, Kathy Acker, Diamanda Galas, Gary Indiana, June Jordan, Cookie Mueller, Lynne Tillman, John Giorno, Pagan Kennedy, Sapphire, Jayne Cortez, and many others. As a small press, High Risk played an important role in providing a space for many emerging writers who would otherwise have found it difficult to get published in mainstream, large houses.

High Risk Books ceased operation in January 1997 because of disagreements with Serpent's Tail in London, although books bearing the High Risk logo continued to be published through Serpent's Tail until 2002.

List of High Risk Titles
Author/Editor	Title	Year	Translator	Previous Edition	Genre	ISBN 10	Notes
Diamanda Galás	The Shit of God	1996			Performing arts/Literature & Essay/PCultural Studies	1-85242-432-X	
Lydia Davis	The End of the Story	1996		1995, Farrar, Straus and Giroux, New York	Fiction	1-85242-420-6	
Daniel Evan Weiss	The Roaches Have No King	1994		1990, Black Swan Books, UK, as Unnatural Selection	Fiction	1-85242-326-9	
Sapphire	American Dreams	1994			Poetry/African-American Literature	1-85242-327-7	
David Trinidad	Answer Song	1994			Poetry/Pop culture/Gay Studies	1-85242-329-3	
Benjamin Weissman	Dear Dead Person	1994			Fiction	1-85242-330-7	Illustrated by the author
June Jordan	Haruko/Love Poems	1994		1993, Virago Press Ltd, UK	Poetry	1-85242-323-4	Foreword by Adrienne Rich
Catherine Bush	Minus Time	1995		1993, HarperCollins Publishers Ltd, Canada	Fiction	1-85242-408-7	
Robert Glück	Margery Kempe	1994			Fiction/Gay Studies/Historical Fiction	1-85242-334-X	
Gary Indiana	Gone Tomorrow	1993				1-85242-336-6	
Daniel Evan Weiss	Hell on Wheels	1991			Fiction/Cult Lit	1-85242-439-7	
Hervé Guibert	To The Friend Who Did Not Save My Life	1994	Linda Coverdale	1990, Editions Gallimard, Paris	Fiction/AIDS	1-85242-328-5	
Lynne Tillman	Haunted Houses	1995		1987, Poseidon Press, New York	Fiction	1-85242-400-1	
Lydia Davis	Break It Down	1996		1986, Knopf, New York	Fiction/Short stories	1-85242-425-1	
Robert Glück	Jack the Modernist	1995		1985, Gay Presses of New York	Fiction/Gay Studies	1-85242-333-1	
Klaus Kertess	South Brooklyn Casket Company	1997			Fiction	1-85242-448-6	
Cookie Mueller	Ask Dr Mueller: The Writings of Cookie Mueller	1997			Fiction/Biograph & Autobiography/Art	1-85242-331-5	Introduction by John Waters
Caitlin Sullivan and Kate Bornstein	Nearly Roadkill: An Infobahn Erotic Adventure	1996			Fiction/Gender Studies/Cyberculture	1-85242-418-4	
Tim Dlugos	Powerless: Selected Poems 1973–1990	1996			Poetry/Gay Studies/AIDS	1-85242-407-9	
Daniel Evan Weiss	The Swine's Wedding	1996			Fiction/Jewish Studies	1-85242-419-2	
Ann Rower	Lee and Elaine	2002			Fiction	1-85242-416-8	
V.K. Mina	The Splintered Day	1999			Fiction/Gay & Lesbian	1-85242-452-4	
Pagan Kennedy	Spinsters	1995			Fiction	1-85242-405-2	
Luisa Valenzuela	Bedside Manners	1995	Margaret Jull Costa	1990, Grupo Editor Latinoamericano S.R.L., Buenos Aires	Fiction	1-85242-313-7	
Ameena Meer	Bombay Talkie	1994			Fiction/Multicultural Studies	1-85242-325-0	
Pagan Kennedy	Stripping and Other Stories	1994			Fiction	1-85242-322-6	
Gary Indiana	Rent Boy	1994			Fiction	1-85242-324-2	
John Giorno	You Got to Burn to Shine: New and Selected Writings	1994			Poetry/Memoir	1-85242-321-8	
William S. Burroughs	Ghost of Chance	1995		1991, Library Fellows of the Whitney Museum of American Art	Fiction/Art/Gay Studies	1-85242-406-0	Illustrations by the author
Adam Klein	The Medicine Burns	1995			Fiction/Gay literature	1-85242-403-6	
Jayne Cortez	Somewhere in Advance of Nowhere	1996			Poetry/Multicultural Studies	1-85242-422-2	Illustrations by Melvin Edwards
Luisa Valenzuela	Symmetries	1998	Margaret Jull Costa	1993, Editorial Sudamericana S.A., Buenos Aires	Fiction/Short stories/Latin American Studies	1-85242-543-1	
Renaud Camus	Tricks: Twenty-Five Encounters	1996	Richard Howard	1981, St Martin's Press Inc., New York	Fiction/Gay Studies/Sexuality	1-85242-414-1	Introduction by Roland Barthes
Heather Lewis	House Rules	1995		1994, Nan A Talese, New York	Fiction/Lesbian Studies	1-85242-413-3	
Ann Rower	Armed Response	1995			Fiction/Film/TV	1-85242-415-X	
Stewart Home	Slow Death	1996			Fiction	1-85242-519-9	
Richard House	Bruiser	1997			Fiction	1-85242-437-0	
Mary Woronov	Snake	2000				1-85242-657-8	
Mary Woronov	Swimming Underground: My Years in the Warhol Factory	2000			Autobiography & Memoir/Art	1-85242-719-1	With photographs by Billy Name
Jack Smith	Wait for Me at the Bottom of the Pool: The Writings of Jack Smith	1997				1-85242-428-1	
Gillaume Dustan	In My Room	1998	Brad Rumph	1996, P.O.L. éditeur, Paris	Fiction	1-85242-590-3	
Amy Scholder and Ira Silverberg	High Risk: An Anthology of Forbidden Writings	1991		1991, Plume, New York	Fiction	1-85242-231-9	Published in the UK by Serpent's Tail, not under the High Risk imprint
Amy Scholder and Ira Silverberg	High Risk 2: Writings on Sex, Death, and Subversion	1994			Fiction	1-85242-366-8	
Richard Peabody	A Different Beat: Writings by Women of the Beat Generation	1997			Fiction/Poetry	1-85242-431-1	
