= The Red Parts =

2007 memoir by Maggie Nelson

- First edition cover
- Author: Maggie Nelson
- Language: English
- Publisher: Free Press
- Publication date: 2007
- ISBN: 978-1-4165-3203-3 (first edition)
- LC Class: HV6529 .N46

The Red Parts: A Memoir, republished as The Red Parts: Autobiography of a Trial, is a 2007 memoir by American author Maggie Nelson. Originally published in March 2007 by Free Press, the memoir was re-issued on April 5, 2016, by Graywolf Press. The memoir follows Nelson and her family following the 2004 re-opening of her aunt Jane's 1969 murder and the trial to convict the suspected killer Gary Leiterman. Nelson wrote the book in the style of prose poems and it confronts themes of grief, true crime and male violence against women. The book received generally positive reviews.

== Background ==
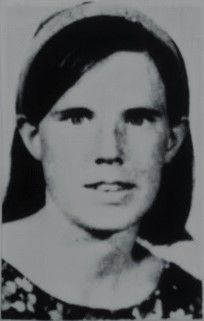
Jane Louise Mixer in her 1964 high school yearbook

In 2005, Maggie Nelson published Jane: A Murder, a novel in verse that told the story of her maternal aunt Jane Louise Mixer, which has been described as her "breakthrough work". Jane had been a student at the University of Michigan Law School in 1969 when she posted a notice on the university bulletin board for a ride to Muskegon, Michigan, and was strangled and shot on the journey. John Norman Collins, perpetrator of the Michigan Murders, was assumed to be the killer but was never formally charged. Nelson strongly identified with her aunt, particularly as she used Jane's diary entries in the book alongside her own writing, and experimented with genre throughout the book. While editing the manuscript in November 2004, her mother received a call from a police detective who told her that a DNA match had led them to a new suspect in the case, Gary Leiterman.

== Synopsis ==
Nelson writes about hearing from her mother shortly before she published Jane: A Murder and discovering that a detective from the Michigan State Police, Detective-Sergeant Eric Shroeder, had re-opened the case of her aunt's murder. She describes her research process while writing Jane and how she spent so much time reading about true crime that she would be haunted by the details, which she called "murder mind". She moved to Middletown, Connecticut, from New York City in fall 2004, where she spent her time following Jane's case as a DNA match indicated that the retired nurse Gary Earl Leiterman could be connected to Jane's murder, instead of the previous suspect, Collins.

Nelson and her family travelled back to Michigan for the pre-trial hearing in January 2005. She documents the evidence and the procession of experts and witnesses. Nelson interweaves the narration with the story of her parents' divorce and her father's death in 1984, and of her own early relationship with a drug addict. She also remains haunted by the results of the Combined DNA Index System, which found that not only was a "mother lode" of Leiterman's DNA present on Jane's body, so was a droplet of blood on her hand from John David Ruelas, a convicted murderer who would have only been four years old at the time of Jane's death.

== Writing process and publication ==
Although Nelson originally intended the book to be a continuation of Jane, she began to write more about her own personal experiences of grief and her childhood. While writing The Red Parts, she read Peter Handke's memoir about his mother's suicide, A Sorrow Beyond Dreams, which influenced her intention for her own book to read like a documentary. She also read books classed as new nonfiction, including In Cold Blood, The Executioner's Song and Slouching Towards Bethlehem, and works on violence, including articles about the Iraq War and Abu Ghraib and Judith Butler’s Precarious Life.

=== Writing style ===
Nelson did not write with a particular structure in mind, although she ultimately decided to divide the book into chapters which would function as prose poems, with a central focus tied to the chapter title. She then shuffled around the chapters until she was happy with the order. Nelson explained in an interview with The Telegraph that in her writing, she often considers her narration to be a separate character, which has been influenced by her poetry background. Mark Fischer for the Milwaukee Journal Sentinel compared the writing style to Joan Didion's The Year of Magical Thinking, particularly the controlled writing in a book that functions as an elegy. Nelson also explores Didion's famous quote, "we tell ourselves stories in order to live", in The Red Parts wondering whether a narrative structure can instead be a trap.

=== Publication ===
The memoir was originally published in March 2007 by Free Press. Following its publication, Nelson became more well-known following the publication of Bluets in 2009, The Art of Cruelty in 2011 and The Argonauts in 2015, the last of which won the National Book Critics Circle Award. On April 5, 2016, The Red Parts was reissued by Graywolf Press with a new preface. As a result of the success of The Argonauts, The Red Parts and Bluets were published for the first time in the United Kingdom and the Commonwealth as Vintage Paperbacks in June 2017, having been acquired by the publisher Jonathan Cape in September 2016.

Originally Nelson intended to call the book The End of the Story as an acknowledgement that sometimes creating a narrative out of something can make it worse. The title The Red Parts comes from the red parts of human bodies, the "blood, genitals, entrails, and mouths", and from the portions of the Bible where Jesus himself speaks, which are considered by Christians to be the most important sections. The subtitle was changed from "A Memoir" when the book was republished in 2016 as Nelson never liked the phrase and was given permission by Graywolf to amend it. She also considered the new subtitle a tribute to Anne Carson's Autobiography of Red.

== Themes ==
In The Red Parts, Nelson continues a study of female victims that she began in Jane, analyzing their roles in newspaper articles, true crime media and torture porn. She captures the fraught relationships that she and others have to her aunt, documenting the interest of the television producers for 48 Hours Mystery, the detective who feels haunted by Jane's ghost and her own choice to document the trial in her memoir. There is a focus on the media surrounding the case but also a question about why she wants to study it and the ethical questions that raises.

=== True crime and genre ===
Much of Nelson's work has been described as "genre-busting". Although the book is officially classified as a memoir and true crime, Nelson has been open about her discomfort with both genres. Although she had previously published collections of poetry, The Red Parts was her first work of non-fiction and similar to her other books of prose, it is not easily categorized into a specific genre. Bridget Read in Literary Hub describes it as "an anti-story", similar to the conclusion in Vox that rather than sitting within a genre, it acts as commentary on them. The Michigan Murders, Edward Keyes' 1978 book, is criticized in the text for its place in the true crime genre. Nelson compares its cover – and, implicitly, its voyeurism and exploitation – to that of Playboy. Unlike other true crime books, even classics of the genres such as In Cold Blood and The Executioner's Song, Nelson does not focus on Leiterman but instead balances a narrative with literary and critical analysis. The scholar Jess Anderson commented that although the book is true crime, Nelson's work is still considered "highbrow", similar to Alexandria Marzano-Lesnevich and James Ellroy. Despite Nelson's attempt to distance herself from the genre, Anderson argued that the book is still fundamentally true crime.

=== Male violence ===
The book examines the clichés surrounding murder, particularly violence against women, and the obsession that society has with these stories. Abbott writes about the affliction of "murder mind", where she was haunted by dark and violent images while writing Jane. Anderson compared this to the "crime funk" described by the writer Rachel Monroe, and argued that it allowed writers to consider the ethics of true crime and the emotional implications of writing about the topic. Two acts of violence – strangling and drowning – recur throughout the book. Nelson describes how, as a child, she would take baths in the dark with coins placed over her eyes and her experience of erotic asphyxiation, which paralleled Jane's murder. Rather than focusing on the violent crime, Nelson explores the generational impact on her family; her mother's desire for a body that cannot be harmed, her sister's habit of watching snuff films and her grandfather's relief when the verdict is read out.

One review described Schroeder and the other detectives investigating Jane's case, along with the production crew for 48 Hours Mystery, as a Greek chorus, removed from the victim and implicitely on the side of patriarchal violence. Nelson includes various examples of male violence being turned upside down, including references to Angela Carter's short story "The Bloody Chamber" and the Reese Witherspoon film Freeway.

== Reception ==
The Red Parts received generally positive reviews, particularly in relation to the prose and imagery. It was described in Vox as receiving "critical, if limited, hosannas when it was first released", including praise from The New York Times, Publishers Weekly and PopMatters. The initial publication was described by the author Annie Dillard as "necessary, austere, and deeply brave."

The book has been praised for its honestly. Publishers Weekly described its "cathartic narrative", although it wondered about the choice to exclude more detailed information about Jane and Leiterman, particularly the latter's motive. Booklist particularly praised the sections about Nelson's childhood and her father's death as being the most emotionally resonant.

Alexandra Molotkow for The Cut praised the memoir's moral complexity and a conclusion, in The Red Parts, Jane and The Art of Cruelty, that it is okay to feel conflicted about these topics. A review in NPR describes this narrative choice – to avoid conclusions and wonder about her own complicity in true crime narratives – as creating an "uneasy masterpiece". The result is compared to a victim impact statement, full of "uncertainty and vulnerability", by Sara Baume for The Irish Times. Newsday said "with Nelson as guide, getting lost in the forest makes for an excellent reading experience".

The New York Times and Kirkus Reviews criticized the sections that focus on Nelson's failed relationship, particularly that she was vague in describing him and tended towards the dramatic in descriptions of her heartbreak, which both critics argued was out of place in the otherwise understated narrative.
