= Adam Klein =

Adam Klein may refer to:

- Adam Klein (swimmer) (born 1988), American swimmer
- Adam Klein (tenor) (born 1960), American opera singer
- Adam Klein (writer) (born 1962), American writer and musician
- Adam Klein (Survivor contestant) (born 1991), winner of Survivor: Millennials vs. Gen X

== See also ==
- Adam Kline (born 1944), member of the Washington State Senate
- Adam W. Kline (1818–1898), American manufacturer, banker and politician from New York
