= Orlando, My Political Biography =

2023 documentary film

- Official poster
- Directed by: Paul B. Preciado
- Screenplay by: Paul B. Preciado
- Based on: Orlando: A Biography by Virginia Woolf
- Produced by: Yaël Fogiel; Laetitia Gonzalez; Annie Ohayon-Dekel; Farid Rezkhallah
- Starring: Oscar (Rosza) S. Miller; Janis Sahraoui; Liz Christin; Elios Levy; Victor Marzouk
- Cinematography: Victor Zebo
- Edited by: Yotam Ben-David
- Music by: Clara Deshayes
- Production companies: Les Films du Poisson; 24images; Arte
- Distributed by: The Party Film Sales
- Release date: 18 February 2023 (Berlinale)
- Running time: 98 minutes
- Country: France
- Language: French
- Box office: $119,324

Orlando, My Political Biography (French: Orlando, ma biographie politique) is a 2023 French documentary film directed by Paul B. Preciado. Preciado organizes a casting and brings together 26 contemporary trans and non-binary people, aged 8 to 70, to bring out Orlando of Virginia Woolf's 1928 novel Orlando: A Biography. It was selected in Encounter at the 73rd Berlin International Film Festival, where it had its world premiere on 18 February 2023. The film was also nominated for Berlinale Documentary Film Award, and won the Teddy Award for the Best Documentary Film.

== Synopsis ==
The film follows Paul B. Preciado and a group of trans and non-binary people as they reinterpret Virginia Woolf's novel Orlando: A Biography. Through personal testimonies, reenactments, and staged scenes, the participants connect Orlando's story with their own experiences of gender and transition.

== Content ==
Blurring the lines between reality and fiction, Preciado expands Virginia Woolf's novel Orlando: A Biography, in which the main character changes gender midway through the story to become a 36-year-old woman. Preciado organized a casting and brought together 26 contemporary trans and non-binary people to each play Orlando. Preciado reconstructs the stages of his personal transformation through authentic voices, writings, and images in the search of the truth. "Every Orlando", he says, "is a transgender person who is risking his, her or their life on a daily basis as they find themselves forced to confront government laws, history and psychiatry, as well as traditional notions of the family and the power of multinational pharmaceutical companies." The film emphasizes that "if 'male' and 'female' are ultimately political and social fictions, then that change is no longer just about gender, but also about poetry, love and skin colour."

== Production ==
Originally, ARTE France reached out to Preciado in hopes of producing a documentary focused on his work as a philosopher. Preciado rejected the idea and instead jokingly suggested that the film should be an adaptation of Virginia Woolf's Orlando: A Biography in an attempt to shut down the conversation. To his surprise, ARTE France agreed and asked Preciado to make the film.

== Cast ==
- Oscar (Rosza) S Miller (Orlando)
- Janis Sahraoui (Orlando)
- Liz Christin (Orlando)
- Elios Levy (Orlando)
- Victor Marzouk (Orlando)
- Paul B. Preciado (Orlando)
- Kori Ceballos (Orlando)
- Vanasay Khamphommala (Orlando)
- Ruben Rizza (Orlando)
- Julia Postollec (Orlando)
- Amir Baylly (Orlando)
- Naëlle Dariya (Orlando)
- Jenny Bel’Air (Orlando)
- Emma Avena (Orlando)
- Lillie (Orlando)
- Arthur (Orlando)
- Eleonore (Orlando)
- La Bourette (Orlando)
- Noam Iroual (Orlando)
- Iris Crosnier (Orlando)
- Clara Deshayes (Orlando)
- Castiel Emery (Sasha)
- Frédéric Pierrot (Psychiatrist)
- Nathan Callot (Armory Salesman)
- Pierre et Gilles (Doctors)
- Tristana Gray Martyr (Goddess of Hormones)
- Le Filip (Goddess of Gender Fucking)
- Miss Drinks (Goddess of Insurrection)
- Tom Dekel (Receptionist)
- Virginie Despentes (Judge)
- Rilke & Pompom (Orlando's Dogs)

== Release ==
It had its world premiere on 18 February 2023 in Encounter at the 73rd Berlin International Film Festival.

On 2 February 2023 it was reported that Paris-based sales company The Party Film Sales has acquired world rights of the film. On 7 March 2023, it was reported that Sideshow and Janus Films bought the right of the film for North America. They are planning a theatrical release after screening of the film at high-profile festivals in North America. It was invited to Horizons section of 57th Karlovy Vary International Film Festival, where it was screened on 30 June 2023. The film is also invited to the 2023 Toronto International Film Festival in Wavelengths section. It will also be screened at the 2023 Atlantic International Film Festival in Documentaries section on 16 September 2023. The film also made it to 'Zabaltegi-Tabakalera' section of the 71st San Sebastián International Film Festival and screened on 23 September 2023.

The documentary was also invited to the 2023 Vancouver International Film Festival in 'Spectrum' section and was screened on 28 September 2023. The film also made it to the 2023 New York Film Festival in the Main Slate, and was screened on 3 October 2023; and to the 18th Rome Film Festival, where it was screened in the same month.

== Reception ==
On Rotten Tomatoes, the film has an approval rating of 94% based on 50 reviews, with an average rating of 7.3/10. The website's critics consensus reads: "A playful documentary with a poetic spirit, Orlando, My Political Biography uses a seminal novel as the framework for an exploration of personal identity"

Fabien Lemercier reviewing for Cineuropa praised the film and wrote, "I can say is that the hair-raising, super-inventive, intelligent and funny film doesn't disappoint." Appreciating the director Preciado's creativity, Lemercier stated, "he extrapolates Virginia Woolf's tale with intellectual agility and cinematographic creativity and ultimately offering up an artisanal, philosophical, modern, and highly appealing vehicle for his activism." Laura Venning rated the film 4 out of 5 and wrote, "Paul B. Preciado's metatextual grappling with Virginia Woolf's novel is a playful and moving exploration of gender identity." Closing her review, Venning opined thar the film is "rightfully destined to become an enduring piece of trans filmmaking." Redmond Bacon of Journey Into Cinema praised the film in general but felt it was a little stagey and repetitive in parts. Concluding his review Bacon wrote, "the final thesis is undeniably moving, ... this excellent film shows the power of imagination to potentially change the world."

=== Accolades ===
Orlando, My Political Biography was shortlisted for European Documentary award in the 36th European Film Awards, but it was not nominated in the nominations announced on 7 November. The awards ceremony took place on 9 December in Berlin.

Award	Date	Category	Recipient	Result	Ref.
Berlin International Film Festival	25 February 2023	Golden Bear Plaque	Paul B. Preciado	Nominated	
Berlin International Film Festival	25 February 2023	Berlinale Documentary Film Award	Paul B. Preciado	Nominated	
Berlin International Film Festival	25 February 2023	Teddy Award for Best Documentary Film	Paul B. Preciado	Won	
Berlin International Film Festival	25 February 2023	Tagesspiegel Reader's Jury Award	Paul B. Preciado	Won	
Berlin International Film Festival	25 February 2023	Encounter: Special Jury Award	Paul B. Preciado	Won	
Jerusalem Film Festival	23 July 2023	Chantel Akerman Award for Best Experimental Documentary	Orlando, My Political Biography	Nominated	
Jerusalem Film Festival	23 July 2023	Chantel Akerman Award - Special Mention	Orlando, My Political Biography	Won	
San Sebastián International Film Festival	30 September 2023	Zabaltegi-Tabakalera Prize	Orlando, My Political Biography	Nominated	
Hamptons International Film Festival	15 October 2023	Documentary Feature	Orlando, My Political Biography	Nominated	
Festival du Nouveau Cinéma de Montreal	15 October 2023	Louve d'Or	Orlando, My Political Biography	Nominated	
Critics' Choice Documentary Awards	12 November 2023	Best First Documentary Feature	Orlando, My Political Biography	Nominated	
Cinema Eye Honors	12 January 2024	Outstanding Debut	Paul B. Preciado	Nominated	
GLAAD Media Awards	14 March 2024	Outstanding Documentary	Orlando, My Political Biography	Nominated	
Lumière Awards	20 January 2025	Best Documentary	Orlando, My Political Biography	Nominated	
