= Emma Ramadan =

American literary translator

- Education: Brown University (BA); American University of Paris (MA)
- Occupations: Literary translator, bookseller, educator
- Known for: English translations of Anne F. Garréta, Abdellah Taïa and Marguerite Duras
- Awards: PEN Translation Prize (2021); Albertine Prize (2018); James Tait Black Memorial Prize for Biography (2024); CWA Crime Fiction in Translation Dagger (2024)
- Website: emmaramadan.com

Emma Ramadan is an American literary translator who translates from French into English. Her translations of more than forty books include novels by Anne F. Garréta, Abdellah Taïa, Virginie Despentes and Kamel Daoud, poetry by Ahmed Bouanani, and, with Olivia Baes, several works by Marguerite Duras. She received the PEN Translation Prize in 2021 for Taïa's A Country for Dying and the Albertine Prize in 2018 for Garréta's Not One Day; her translations have also won the James Tait Black Memorial Prize for Biography and a Crime Writers' Association Dagger. She co-founded Riffraff, a bookstore and bar in Providence, Rhode Island, and in 2025 became program director of the Art Omi: Writers residency.

== Early life and education ==
Ramadan grew up in Southern California. Her mother is British and her father is Lebanese and left Lebanon during the civil war; her parents spoke French to each other at home as a private language, and she began studying it at school in order to understand them. She studied comparative literature at Brown University, where she followed the department's translation track and worked with the poets Cole Swensen, Forrest Gander and the critic and translator Robyn Creswell, and interned at Archipelago Books. She then earned a master's degree in cultural translation at the American University of Paris.

== Career ==
=== Translation ===
Ramadan's first published translation was Garréta's 1986 novel Sphinx, a love story written without any grammatical marker of either protagonist's gender, which she began as her master's thesis and which Deep Vellum published in 2015. Reviewing it in the London Review of Books, Adam Mars-Jones described the book as "considerably more than a language game". The translation was longlisted for the 2016 Best Translated Book Award and the 2016 PEN Translation Prize.

Ramadan has said she became fully fluent in French only during a year in Morocco, where a Fulbright grant allowed her to study and catalogue the archive of the Moroccan poet and filmmaker Ahmed Bouanani in Marrakesh. Her translation of his poetry, The Shutters, was supported by a 2016 PEN/Heim Translation Fund Grant and a 2017 National Endowment for the Arts translation fellowship and was published by New Directions in 2018. She guest-edited a 2016 issue of Words Without Borders devoted to Moroccan writing.

Her translation of Garréta's Not One Day (Deep Vellum, 2017) won the 2018 Albertine Prize, a reader-voted award for contemporary French-language fiction published in the United States, and was a finalist for the Lambda Literary Award for Lesbian Fiction. In 2018 she also published the first English translation of Despentes's novel Pretty Things (Feminist Press), a finalist for the 2019 Best Translated Book Award, and Brice Matthieussent's Revenge of the Translator (Deep Vellum). With Olivia Baes she has translated Duras's Me & Other Writing (Dorothy, 2019) and the first English edition of Duras's second novel, The Easy Life (Bloomsbury, 2022).

Taïa's A Country for Dying (Seven Stories Press, 2020), which Kirkus Reviews called "lyrical and impassioned", won the 2021 PEN Translation Prize. Her later translations include Garréta's In Concrete (2021), Daoud's Zabor, or the Psalms (2021), Maud Ventura's debut My Husband (HarperVia, 2023), which won the Crime Writers' Association's 2024 Dagger for Crime Fiction in Translation, and two illustrated books by the Lebanese artist Lamia Ziadé, supported by a second NEA fellowship in 2023; one of them, My Great Arab Melancholy (Pluto Press, 2024), won the James Tait Black Memorial Prize for Biography, announced in May 2025. Into the Sun, her and Baes's translation of Charles Ferdinand Ramuz's 1922 novel Présence de la mort (New Directions, 2025), was longlisted for the 2026 National Translation Award in prose.

Ramadan has described her interests as "undersung women novelists, experimental literature, and writers from the Arab world", and has said she is drawn to French-language writing from outside France, particularly from Morocco, Algeria and Senegal, which she considers underrepresented in English.

=== Riffraff and other work ===
In December 2017 Ramadan and her husband, the translator and bookseller Tom Roberge, opened Riffraff, a bookstore and bar in the Olneyville neighborhood of Providence, Rhode Island, specializing in small-press and translated literature. The couple sold the business in 2023 to Ottavia De Luca and Lucas Mann.

In May 2025 she was appointed program director of the Art Omi: Writers residency in Ghent, New York. She has also taught as an adjunct instructor at the New York University School of Professional Studies.

== Selected translations ==
- Anne F. Garréta, Sphinx (Deep Vellum, 2015)
- Fouad Laroui, The Curious Case of Dassoukine's Trousers (Deep Vellum, 2016)
- Anne F. Garréta, Not One Day (Deep Vellum, 2017)
- Ahmed Bouanani, The Shutters (New Directions, 2018)
- Virginie Despentes, Pretty Things (Feminist Press, 2018)
- Brice Matthieussent, Revenge of the Translator (Deep Vellum, 2018)
- Marguerite Duras, Me & Other Writing (Dorothy, 2019), with Olivia Baes
- Marcus Malte, The Boy (Restless Books, 2019), with Tom Roberge
- Meryem Alaoui, Straight from the Horse's Mouth (Other Press, 2020)
- Abdellah Taïa, A Country for Dying (Seven Stories Press, 2020)
- Anne F. Garréta, In Concrete (Deep Vellum, 2021)
- Kamel Daoud, Zabor, or the Psalms (Other Press, 2021)
- Lizzy Mercier Descloux, Desiderata (Inpatient Press, 2022)
- Barbara Molinard, Panics (Feminist Press, 2022)
- Marguerite Duras, The Easy Life (Bloomsbury, 2022), with Olivia Baes
- Djaïli Amadou Amal, The Impatient (HarperVia, 2022)
- Maud Ventura, My Husband (HarperVia, 2023)
- Lamia Ziadé, My Great Arab Melancholy (Pluto Press, 2024)
- Abdellah Taïa, Living in Your Light (Seven Stories Press, 2025)
- Charles Ferdinand Ramuz, Into the Sun (New Directions, 2025), with Olivia Baes

== Awards and honors ==
- 2016: Longlisted, Best Translated Book Award and PEN Translation Prize, for Sphinx
- 2016: PEN/Heim Translation Fund Grant
- 2017: National Endowment for the Arts Literature Translation Fellowship
- 2018: Albertine Prize, for Not One Day
- 2018: Finalist, Lambda Literary Award for Lesbian Fiction, for Not One Day
- 2019: Finalist, Best Translated Book Award, for Pretty Things
- 2021: PEN Translation Prize, for A Country for Dying
- 2023: National Endowment for the Arts Literature Translation Fellowship
- 2024: CWA Dagger for Crime Fiction in Translation, for My Husband
- 2024: James Tait Black Memorial Prize for Biography, for My Great Arab Melancholy (presented 2025)
- 2026: Longlisted, National Translation Award in Prose, for Into the Sun
