= Lyric essay =

Literary hybrid with elements of poetry

Lyric Essay is a literary hybrid that combines elements of poetry, essay, and memoir. The lyric essay is a relatively new form of creative nonfiction.

John D’Agata and Deborah Tall published a definition of the lyric essay in the Seneca Review in 1997: "The lyric essay takes from the prose poem in its density and shapeliness, its distillation of ideas and musicality of language."

== Form ==
Lyric essays are unique in their reliance on form. Two types of lyric essay forms exist: found form and invented form. Found form borrows the form of an external frame, such as footnotes, indexes, or letters (epistolary form), to bring about the meaning of the essay. Invented form can take any shape and organization which the writer creates to further communicate the essay.

== Examples ==
Some lyric essays take poetic forms, such as Anne Carson's "The Glass Essay," which is lineated and organized in tercets and quatrains. According to Mary Heather Noble, the lyric essay is open to exploration and experimentation, and allows for the discovery of an authentic narrative voice.

== Content ==
The lyric essay can take on any theme or topic, often containing what Lia Purpura calls "provisional responses," as opposed to certitude. The lyric essay can contain arguments, but typically subversive or subversively argued ones. Lyric essays often rely on research and references, and can be interdisciplinary in their research methods and content. Lyric essays often consist of conversational digressions, due to its lack of a restrictive form. Some lyric essays include vignettes, such as Maggie Nelson's Bluets.

== Language ==
Polyvocality and code-switching play a major role in the lyric essay. Both techniques allow for the lyric essay to be either very personal or to take a more objective tone. An example of this is found in Claudia Rankine's Citizen: An American Lyric, which the book's publisher classifies as both poetry and creative nonfiction—and is often referred to as work of lyric essays. Rankine code switches between highly personal, diaristic language and formal, academic language—as well as a variety of other types of language.

== Publications ==
Prominent publications featuring the lyric essay are Bomb (magazine) (under directorship of Betsy Sussler), Evergreen Review (under Barney Rosset), and the Seneca Review (under the editorship of Debora Tall and John D'Agata).
