= Testo Junkie =

2018 book by Paul B. Preciado

- Author: Paul B. Preciado
- Translator: Bruce Benderson
- Language: Spanish
- Published: 2008
- Publisher: Espasa (2008); The Feminist Press (2013)
- Pages: 324
- ISBN: 9788467026931
- OCLC: 212739443

Testo Junkie (published in English with the subtitle Sex, Drugs, and Biopolitics in The Pharmacopornographic Era) is a book of autotheory, by contemporary writer and philosopher Paul B. Preciado, first published in Spanish in 2008 (Testo yonqui / Espasa-Calpe), then in English in 2013 by The Feminist Press, translated by Bruce Benderson. It chronicles Preciado's multifaceted and liminal experience taking a topical testosterone called Testogel as a political and performative act, while working in Paris, France, as well as intertwining perspectives on pharmaceuticals and pornography. The book was the choice of McKenzie Wark in a list of the 11 best scholarly books of the 2010s by The Chronicle of Higher Education.

== Outline and concept ==
Preciado declares that Testo Junkie is a "body-essay", and writes of his use of testosterone as a way of undoing gender inscribed on the body by the capitalistic commodification and mobilization of sexuality and reproduction, a process transcendent from the social norm expected with transitioning. Testo Junkie is a homage to French writer Guillaume Dustan, a close gay friend of Preciado's who contracted HIV and died of an accidental overdose of a medication he was taking. In the book Preciado also processes the changes in his body due to testosterone through the lens of a romantic affair with his then lover, French writer Virginie Despentes, referred to as "VD."

Sex and sexuality is a major theme in the book, as it is framed to pick up where Michel Foucault's The History of Sexuality, and the writings of Judith Butler leave off. Testo Junkie is a political history of reproductive technologies including oral contraceptive pills, Viagra, drugs used in doping, fluoxetine, and the history of clinical testosterone and estrogen usage, that connect to Preciado's own use of pharmaceuticals, among other things. It discusses potentia gaudendi, the idea that the body has an inherent potential for pleasure.

=== Pharmacopornographic capitalism ===
Preciado coins the term pharmacopornographic era in the book, a term based on his idea that the pharmaceutical industry, pornography industry, and late capitalism are integrated in their responsibility to the cycles of reproductive and social control through the regulation of bodies: it is framed into the micro-biological scale of design, and its place within a global political, social and economic context and strategies.

== Reception ==
The English translation of Testo Junkie was a finalist for the 2014 Lambda Literary Award for Transgender Nonfiction.
