= Adam Klein (writer) =

American writer and musician (born 1962)

- Born: 1962 (age 63–64); Coral Gables, Florida
- Education: San Francisco State University, The New School
- Occupations: Novelist; short story writer; essayist; musician

Adam Klein (born 1962) is an American writer and musician. He currently divides his time between New York, San Francisco, and India.

== Early years ==
Klein was born in 1962 in Coral Gables, Florida. He left high school in Miami with a GED and attended Miami Dade Community College, where he studied fashion and poetry. He spent one year as an undergraduate at the University of Iowa, studying poetry with Marvin Bell. He then left school to live briefly in Chicago and Boston. With friends from work in Boston, he started the first incarnation of the band The Size Queens. Eventually, he moved to San Francisco, where he spent many years in the 1980s as a performer in the local club scene.

== Literary career ==
Klein graduated from San Francisco State University, where he studied with Bob Glück and Molly Giles, with an MA in creative writing. He later earned an MFA in creative writing from The New School, where he worked with Robert Polito, Lynne Tillman, Honor Moore, Sigrid Nunez, and Patrick McGrath. His first book, The Medicine Burns, is a collection of short stories that was nominated for a Lambda Book Award. Selections from the collection appear in Best American Gay Fiction, edited by Brian Bouldrey, and Men on Men 5, edited by David Bergman. With poet Thomas Avena, Klein cowrote the artist monograph Jerome: After the Pageant about mixed-media artist Jerome Caja. Klein is also the author of the novel Tiny Ladies. An excerpt of Tiny Ladies appears in the anthology Pills, Thrills, Chills and Heartache: Adventures in the First Person, edited by Michelle Tea and Clint Catalyst. The Medicine Burns and Tiny Ladies are now part of Dzanc Books' rEprint series.

Klein was a Peace Corps volunteer in Bangladesh and then a Fulbright lecturer in India. He later worked at the American University of Beirut. He later served as an assistant professor of English at the American University of Afghanistan. During his second Fulbright-Nehru lectureship at the prestigious IIT-Kanpur, Klein captured the imagination of some of the brightest minds in India, and soon became immensely popular with the student community, through refreshingly offbeat choice of the subjects he taught, his stimulating pedagogy and close involvement with students. Several publications have featured essays by Klein on his experiences and thoughts about his time in South Asia and the Middle East.

He edited the short-story anthology The Gifts of the State: New Writing from Afghanistan, which was published by Dzanc Books in November 2013. The collection features work from students of Klein's open creative writing workshops in Kabul, and according to the publisher, it "gives voice to a generation clamoring to be heard under the simplifying headlines and collectivized identity that thirty years of war have brought upon the country."

== Musical and multimedia career ==
Klein is also a singer-songwriter who has been a part of several musical projects. In 1999, Klein began making music with cowriter Michael Mullen and started the band Glasstown, which recorded two CDs. The two collaborated to form the band Roman Evening, which also recorded two CDs. Roman Evening's second CD was a soundtrack to accompany Klein's novel Tiny Ladies.

In 2003, Klein and Mullen began a close collaboration with Tim Mooney, former producer and drummer with American Music Club. Mooney was a member of Klein's current project, The Size Queens, for its first four CDs, producing, drumming, and playing bass and guitar on various tracks. He died suddenly in 2013. The Size Queens began to work with Wally Sound and continues to work with players associated with Mooney's studio, Closer. With The Size Queens, Klein has collaborated with many visual artists, writers, and musicians to produce seven CDs and many multimedia projects.

From its inception at the start of the Iraq War, The Size Queens has been engaged in political issues, particularly the wars in Iraq and Afghanistan; this latter focus reflects Klein's experience and literary output. More recent work has focused on the military and prison industrial complexes as well as matters of economic disparity and the environment. This includes the 2013 CD Save the Plant! Two video premieres followed in 2014: "Spinning World," which appeared along with the short story "Carefree," in Pank Magazine and "Fifty Shades of Pale," which appeared with an extensive profile of the band by Chin-Sun Lee, on The Believer blog. The latter video was directed by Chuck Mobley in Rancho Mirage, California, and stars Mx. Justin Vivian Bond.

The band sees itself as a "project" with an interest in exploring media distribution in a variety of media platforms and applications. This focus can be seen in the 2012 video album Tammy, Cybertariat, At the Aral Sea, for which The Size Queens partnered with artists Fred Tomaselli, Scott Blake, and Michael Rackowitz and performer and author Mx. Justin Vivian Bond for a faux Kickstarter campaign. In 2011, the band released the case file and CD Appetite for Redaction. In 2010, the band released the CD The Size Queens III in collaboration with SF Camerawork’s exhibition An Autobiography of the San Francisco Bay Area, Part 1: San Francisco Plays Itself. The CD was released as part of a 65-page exhibition catalog and includes an introduction by Mary Gaitskill and guest performers Laura Albert and Guillermo Gomez-Peña. Painter Amy Sillman selected the group's Patrick Hillman directed video "Reading Rosalind Krauss" as one of her top ten picks in Artforum in December 2009. In addition, Tony Cokes, professor of modern culture and media at Brown University, created his own sing-along video from the song for his Retro (Pop, Terror, Critique) exhibition.

Other Size Queens collaborators have included Nicole Brodsky, former American Music Club bassist Danny Pearson, guitarist Mike Carnahan, and singer-songwriters Carlos Forster, John Murry, and Hannah Marcus. Klein also has collaborated on media projects and literary works with artist Marco Breuer; writer Chin-Sun Lee; photographer Jeanne Friscia; and extensively with Chuck Mobley, former director of SF Camerawork, a nonprofit visual arts space in San Francisco.

== Bibliography ==
=== Full-length works ===
- The Medicine Burns, collection of short fiction (High Risk Books, 1995; Dzanc Books reprint, 2013)
- Jerome: After the Pageant, artist monograph (Bastard Books/Distributed Art Publishers, 1996)
- Tiny Ladies, novel (Serpent's Tail Books, 2003; Dzanc Books reprint, 2013)
- The Gifts of the State: New Writing from Afghanistan (editor), short-story anthology (Dzanc Books, November 2013)

=== Short fiction ===
- "Club Feet", Men on Men 5 (Plume, 1994)
- "Territories", ReMapping the Occident (Fall 1995)
- "Undertow", Bomb Magazine (Summer 1995)
- "The Medicine Burns", Best American Gay Fiction (Little, Brown, 1996)
- "Tamarisks", The James White Review (Summer 1997)
- "A Desert Shade", Gay Travels: A Literary Companion (Whereabouts Press, 1998)
- "The Venetian Pool", SMTWTFS (Roth Horowitz Press, 2002)
- "Dr. K.", Vital Signs: Essential AIDS Fiction (Carroll & Graf, 2007)
- "The Children on the Hill", Jeanne Friscia photos/Adam Klein fiction, Camerawork: A Journal of Photographic Arts, Vol. 36, No. 1 (Spring/Summer 2009)
- "A Hardship Post", Fourteen Hills (January 2012)
- "Three Who Did Not Return", Fiction International 46, Real Time/Virtual (Fall 2013)
- "Everything Inside Us", Educe, Issue 5 (Spring 2014)
- "Carefree", Pank Magazine (October 3, 2014)

=== Nonfiction articles, essays, and reviews ===
- "The New Eyes", Life Sentences: Writers, Artists, and AIDS (Mercury House Books, 1994)
- "Survival and Ecstasy in David Cannon Dashiell", catalog for the "Visual Aid at Sixteen with David Cannon Dashiell's Queer Mysteries" exhibition at Yerba Buena Center for the Arts, San Francisco, CA (April 2005)
- "The Big Picture: Adam Klein Explores the Lonely Amusements of Jem Cohen's Chain", Camerawork: A Journal of Photographic Arts, Vol. 33, No. 2, (Fall/Winter 2006), 26-35
- "Pain management", San Francisco Bay Guardian (July 25, 2006)
- "No Truth to Speak to Power", San Francisco Bay Guardian (October 17, 2006)
- "Beirut's Brood", Performing Arts Journal (Winter 2011)
- "Out Of View: The Unnameable Poor in India and Bangladesh", openDemocracy, (May 11, 2012)
- "One Afghan's Three-Generation Quest for Peace", New York Times, At War Blogs (May 31, 2012)
- "Cairo: Dispatch", Huffington Post (December 10, 2012)
- "Sontag, Osiris", Essays and Fictions (March 2013)
- "Amanullah Mojadidi's Spectral Documents of Migration", Camerawork: An Online Journal of Photographic Arts (2014)
- "Ingeworthy: Teaching William Inge in Kabul", Bright Lights Film Journal (2020)
- "A Generation", Evergreen Review (2021)

== Discography and digital media ==
=== With Glasstown ===
- Living and Forgetting (Bitter Stag Records, 2001)
- Your Trendy Dump (Bitter Stag Records, 2003)

=== With Roman Evening ===
- Together Now (Bitter Stag Records, 2002)
- Tiny Ladies (Bitter Stag Records, 2003)

=== With The Size Queens ===
- is it IN yet? (Bitter Stag Records, 2006)
- Magic Dollar Shoppe (Bitter Stag Records, 2008)
- Our Literal Speed Soundtrack, ZKM Der Performativ Diskurs (produced for the "Our Literal Speed" conference on art and history at Zentrum fur Kunst und Medientechnologie Karlsruhe; University of Chicago; Princeton University; and The Getty Center, Los Angeles, 2009)
- The Size Queens III (Bitter Stag Records, released as part of the SF Camerawork exhibition catalogue "An Autobiography of the San Francisco Bay Area; Part 1: San Francisco Plays Itself" April 15, 2010)
- "Old Skin" (video premiere on the Ninth Letter blog, February 14, 2012)
- Appetite for Redaction (Bitter Stag Records, released on September 11, 2011)
- Consumption Work: Tammy, Cybertariat, At the Aral Sea, video/song cycle (Bitter Stag Records, premiered on The Doctor T. J. Eckleburg Review website on Election Day 2012)
- Save the Plant! (Bitter Stag Records, 2013)
- "Fifty Shades of Pale" (video premiere on the Believer magazine website, November 18, 2014)
- To the Country (Bitter Stag Records, embedded in a multimedia short story collection iBook with contributions by: Rae Bryant; Maria Bustillos; Brian Evenson; Paul Kingsnorth; J. Robert Lennon; Rick Moody; Jim Shepard; Melanie Rae Thon; Lynne Tillman; and Joy Williams, 2015)
- Between the Cheeks (Bitter Stag Records, 2017)

== Awards ==
- Academy of American Poets Award 1979
- Norton Family Foundation Grant 1995
- Vogelstein Foundation Grant 2001
- Fulbright Lecturer, India 2006–2007
- Yaddo writer in residence 2008
- Ucross writer in residence 2008
- Pushcart Prize nomination for "A Hardship Post" 2012
- Millay Colony writer in residence 2014
- National Board of Directors, The Jerome Project 2015
- Fulbright Nehru Senior Scholar, India 2015–2016
