= High Risk =

High Risk may refer to:

- High Risk (TV series), 1988 American television series
- High Risk (1981 film), a film written and directed by Stewart Raffill
- High Risk (1995 film), an action film starring Jet Li
- High Risk (1999 film), a Hong Kong movie starring Jackie Chan, originally known under the title Gorgeous
- High Risk (album), a 2015 album by Dave Douglas
- High Risk (novel), written under the pseudonym, Carolyn Keene
- High Risk Books, a defunct publisher in New York City
- High Risk Convective Outlook, issued by the Storm Prediction Center when a widespread outbreak of thunderstorms is expected
