= Varieties of Disturbance =

2007 short story collection by Lydia Davis

- First edition
- Author: Lydia Davis
- Language: English
- Genre: Short stories, flash fiction
- Publisher: FSG
- Publication date: 2007
- Publication place: United States
- Media type: Print (hardback & paperback)
- Pages: 240
- ISBN: 978-0-374-28173-1
- Preceded by: Samuel Johnson Is Indignant
- Followed by: The Collected Stories of Lydia Davis

Varieties of Disturbance is Lydia Davis's fourth collection of short stories. The book, published in 2007 by FSG, was a finalist for the National Book Awards for Fiction that year. The 57 short stories therein include ones published in a number of literary magazines, compilations, and pamphlets as well as new work, and range in length from several pages to couplet-length.

== Contents ==
- "A Man from Her Past", first published in Bomb
- "Dog and Me", first published in NOON
- "Enlightened", first published in Columbia
- "The Good Taste Contest", first published in NOON
- "Collaboration with Fly"
- "Kafka Cooks Dinner", first published in Fence, some of which's material was taken from Letters to Milena by Franz Kafka, tr. Philip Boehm (New York: Schocken Books, 1990)
- "Tropical Storm", first published in Tolling Elves
- "Good Times", first published in The Unmade Bed, (ed. Laura Chester; Boston: Faber & Faber, 1992)
- "Idea for a Short Documentary Film"
- "Forbidden Subjects", first published in Avec
- "Two Types", first published in 32 Poems
- "The Senses", first published in Gulf Coast
- "Grammar Questions", first appeared in 110 Stories (ed. Ulrich Baer; New York: New York University Press, 2002), reprinted in Harper's August 2002
- "Hand"
- "The Caterpillar", first published in NOON
- "Childcare", first published in Shiny
- "We Miss You: A Study of Get-Well Letters from a Class of Fourth-Graders"
- "Passing Wind", first published in Shiny
- "Television", first published in Conjunctions and John Cheney's Literary Magazine (sections 1 and 2), appeared in The Pushcart Prize, 1989-1990 (ed. Bill Henderson, New York, Pushcart, 1989)
- "Jane and the Cane", first published in NOON
- "Getting to Know Your Body", first published in NOON
- "Absentminded", first published in NOON
- "Southward Bound, Reads Worstward Ho", first published in The World (footnotes only, under the title "Going South While Reading Worstward Ho"), also appeared under the title "Going South, Reads Worstward Ho" in New and Used by Marc Joseph (London: Steidl Publishing, 2006)
- "The Walk"
- "Varieties of Disturbance", first published in A Little Magazine, reprinted in Harper's April 1993
- "Lonely", first published in Tolling Elves
- "Mrs. D and Her Maids"
- "20 Sculptures in One Hour", first published in Hambone
- "Nietszche"
- "What You Learn About the Baby", excerpts first published in Tolling Elves, excerpts also appeared in Cradle and All (ed. Laura Chester; Boston: Faber & Faber, 1989)
- "Her Mother's Mother", first published in American Letters & Commentary as "Her Mother's Mother: 1" and "Her Mother's Mother: 2"
- "How It Is Done", first published in Hambone, also appeared in New York Sex (ed. Jane DeLynn, New York: Painted Leaf Press, 1998)
- "Insomnia", first published in NOON
- "Burning Family Members", first published in Conjunctions
- "The Way to Perfection", first published in Insurance
- "The Fellowship", first published in Tolling Elves as "The Fellowship: 1" and "The Fellowship: 2"
- "Helen and Vi: A Study in Health and Vitality"
- "Reducing Expenses", first published in Conjunctions
- "Mother's Reaction to My Travel Plans"
- "For Sixty Cents", first published in Northern Lit Quarterly
- "How Shall I Mourn Them?", first published in Shiny
- "A Strange Impulse"
- "How She Could Not Drive", first published in Notus as "Clouds in the Sky"
- "Suddenly Afraid", first published in Bomb
- "Getting Better", first published in 32 Poems
- "Head, Heart"
- "The Strangers"
- "The Busy Road", first published in Tolling Elves
- "Order"
- "The Fly", first published in Tolling Elves
- "Traveling With Mother"
- "Index Entry"
- "My Son", first published in The World
- "Example of the Continuing Past Tense in a Hotel Room"
- "Cape Cod Diary", first published as a pamphlet by Belladonna Books (Brooklyn, 2003)
- "Almost Over: What's the Word?", first published in Bomb
- "A Different Man", first published in Quick Fiction

== Critical reception ==
Siddhartha Deb, writing for The New York Times, called the book "Haunting, dreamlike and yet indisputably real" and praised her exacting use of language in the style of European postmodernism. Michael Miller also praised the collection for The Believer, admiring Davis' humor and precise writing style. Asali Solomon, with Paste, called the collection's short stories "addictively powerful, rapid encounters with tragedy, humor and existential confusion in the span of a page or a line."
