= Yotam Ben-David =

Israeli director, writer and editor

- Born: 1987; Israel
- Occupation: Film director, writer and editor
- Years active: 2013-present

Yotam Ben-David is a film director, screenwriter, and film editor. His films have been selected and won awards at numerous festival including Visions du Réel, FIDMarseille, Sarajevo Film Festival, Jerusalem International Film Festival, among others.

== Early life and education ==
Ben-David was born in 1987 and grew up in a village between Jerusalem and Tel Aviv near Valley of Elah. His early love for musicals and exposure to international cinema at a Jerusalem cinematheque had shaped his desire to make films and explore his surroundings through the art of cinema. He later studied film at the Minshar School of Art in Tel Aviv, graduating with honors.

== Career ==
In 2013, Ben-David wrote, directed and starred in his debut short film Remains, which premiered at the Jerusalem Film Festival and won the Van Leer Group Foundation Award for Best Student Short Narrative Film. In 2018, he wrote, directed and edited Thunder from the Sea, which premiered at FIDMarseille and won Prix de la Fondation culturelle META. The following year, his script for his debut feature film titled Over Time and Distance was selected into the Cannes Film Festival's Atelier Cinéfondation.

In 2020, he wrote, directed and edited short film End Have You Seen That Man?, which was shot in a small village of Slon in the mountains of Romania. The film premiered in the European Shorts Section at Sarajevo Film Festival and later screened in competition at Jerusalem Film Festival, Vilnius International Film Festival, among others. In 2023, he served as an editor on documentary feature film Orlando, My Political Biography.

In 2024, Ben-David wrote, directed and edited short film End of West, which explored themes of exile, identity, and cultural decline. It premiered in competition at FIDMarseille and screened at Filmfest Dresden. In 2025, he wrote, directed, edited and produced documentary short film Far From the Light of Day, which premiered in competition at Visions du Réel.

== Filmography ==
- Far from the Light of Day (2025)
- End of the West (2024)
- Have You Seen That Man? (2020)
- Thunder from the Sea (2018)
- Long Distance (2015)
- Remains (2013)
