= Maggie Nelson =

American writer

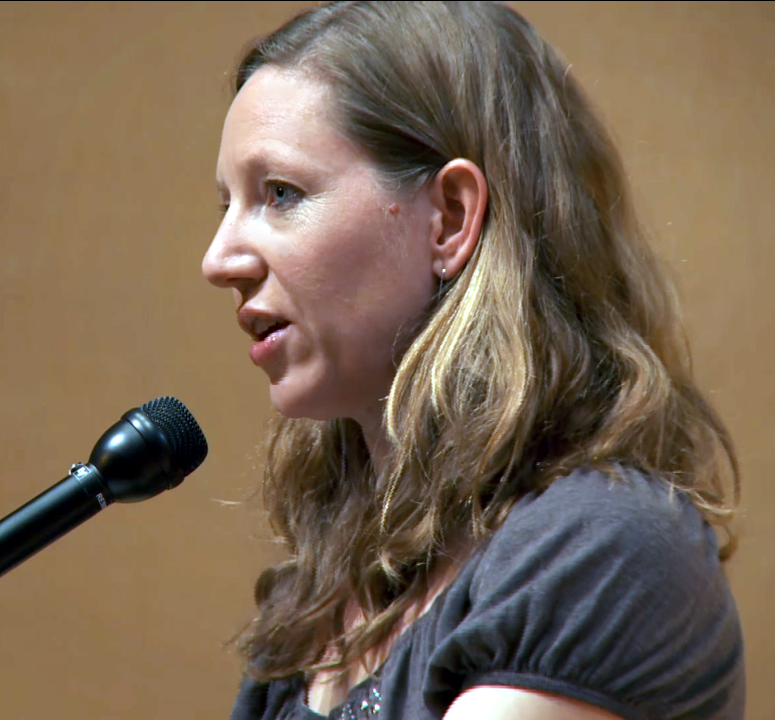
- Maggie Nelson at the San Francisco Public Library
- Born: 1973 (age 52–53)
- Education: Wesleyan University; CUNY Graduate Center
- Spouse: Harry Dodge
- Children: 2
- Writing career
- Genres: Non-fiction; poetry; memoir; theory
- Notable awards: MacArthur Fellow

Maggie Nelson (born 1973) is an American writer. She has been described as a genre-busting writer defying classification, working in autobiography, art criticism, theory, feminism, queerness, sexual violence, the history of the avant-garde, aesthetic theory, philosophy, scholarship, and poetry. Nelson received a 2016 MacArthur Fellowship, and several other major awards in the years before that. She is best known for her 2015 work of autotheory The Argonauts.

== Life and career ==
Nelson was born in 1973, the second daughter of Bruce and Barbara Nelson. She grew up in Marin County, California. Her parents divorced when she was eight. In 1984, Nelson's father died of a heart attack.

In 1990, Nelson moved to Connecticut to study English at Wesleyan University, where she attended classes by Annie Dillard. After college, she lived in New York City, where she trained as a dancer, worked at the Poetry Project at St. Mark's Church, and studied informally with writer Eileen Myles. She enrolled at the CUNY Graduate Center in 1998 and obtained a Ph.D. in English literature in 2004. At CUNY, Nelson studied with Wayne Koestenbaum and Eve Kosofsky Sedgwick, among others. She left New York in 2005 to take a teaching job at the California Institute of the Arts.

Nelson is the author of several books of nonfiction and poetry. She also writes frequently on art, including essays on artists Sarah Lucas, Matthew Barney, Carolee Schneemann, A. L. Steiner, Kara Walker, and Rachel Harrison.

Nelson has taught about writing, critical theory, art, aesthetics, and literature, at the graduate writing program of The New School, Wesleyan University, Pratt Institute, and California Institute of the Arts. As of 2021, she was a professor of English at the University of Southern California.

Nelson is married to the artist Harry Dodge, who is fluidly gendered. They live with their family in Los Angeles.

== Books ==
The Argonauts (2015) won the National Book Critics Circle Award in Criticism and was a New York Times best-seller. It is a work of autotheory, offering thinking about desire, identity, family-making, and the limitations and possibilities of love and language. In it, Nelson documents the changes in her body throughout pregnancy with her son, Iggy, and that of her spouse Harry Dodge's body after commencing testosterone and undergoing chest reconstruction ("top surgery"). Nelson has described it as reflecting 20 years of living with and learning from feminist and queer theory.

The Art of Cruelty (2011), a work of cultural, art, and literary criticism, was featured on the front cover of the Sunday Book Review of the New York Times and was named a New York Times Notable Book of the Year. It covers a wide range of topics, including Sylvia Plath's poetry, Francis Bacon's paintings, the Saw franchise, and Yoko Ono's performance art, and offers a model of how one might balance strong ethical convictions with equally strong appreciation for work that tests the limits of taste, taboo, and permissibility.

Bluets (2009) is a book of prose in numbered segments that deals with pain, pleasure, heartbreak, and the consolations of philosophy, all through the lens of the color blue. It quickly became a cult classic, and was named one of the 10 best books of the past 20 years by Bookforum.

Women, the New York School, and Other True Abstractions (2007) is a scholarly book about gender and abstract expressionism from the 1950s through the 1980s. It focuses on the work of painter Joan Mitchell and poets Barbara Guest, John Ashbery, James Schuyler, Frank O'Hara, Bernadette Mayer, Alice Notley, and Eileen Myles. In 2008 it received the Susanne M. Glasscock Award for Interdisciplinary Scholarship.

Jane: A Murder (2005) and The Red Parts: Autobiography of a Trial (2007) contend with the 1969 murder of Nelson's aunt Jane near Ann Arbor, Michigan. Jane: A Murder explores the incident via a collage of poetry, prose, dream-accounts, and documentary sources, including local and national newspapers, related "true crime" books, and fragments from Jane's diaries. Part elegy, part memoir, detective story, part meditation on sexual violence, and part conversation between the living and the dead, Jane is widely recognized as having expanded the notion of what poetry can do—what kind of stories it can tell, and how it can tell them. It was a finalist for the PEN / Martha Albrand Award for the Art of the Memoir.

The Red Parts picks up where Jane left off, recounting the trial of a new suspect in Jane's murder 36 years after the fact. It is a coming-of-age story, a documentary account of a trial, and an interrogation of the American obsession with violence and missing white women and the nature of grief, justice, and empathy.

In On Freedom (2021), Nelson returned to criticism, responding to the American right's claim to the concept of "freedom," while the left has turned increasingly toward "a discourse about when and how certain transgressions in art should be 'called out' and 'held accountable,' with the twist that now the so-called left is often cast—rightly or wrongly—in the repressive, punitive position". Through the lenses of art, drugs, sex, and climate, Nelson makes a case for the liberal claim to freedom.

Nelson's collections of poetry include Something Bright, Then Holes (2007), The Latest Winter (2003), and Shiner (2001).

== Awards and honors ==
- 2007 Arts Writers grant from Creative Capital and Andy Warhol Foundation for the Visual Arts.
- 2010 Guggenheim Fellowship in Nonfiction.
- 2011 National Endowment for the Arts Fellowship for Poetry.
- 2012 Creative Capital Literature Fellowship
- 2015 New York Times Notable Book, The Argonauts.
- 2015 National Book Critics Circle Award (Criticism), winner for Argonauts.
- 2016 MacArthur Fellowship, writer.

== Bibliography ==
- Shiner (Hanging Loose Press, 2001). OCLC 45223536
- The Latest Winter (Hanging Loose Press, 2003). OCLC 50868215
- Jane: A Murder (Soft Skull, 2005). OCLC 57506563
- The Red Parts: A Memoir (Free Press, 2007). OCLC 71275645
- Something Bright, Then Holes (Soft Skull, 2007). OCLC 148844319
- Women, the New York School, and Other True Abstractions (University of Iowa Press, 2007). OCLC 609313973
- Bluets (Wave Books, 2009). OCLC 303931395
- The Art of Cruelty: A Reckoning (W. W. Norton & Company, 2011). OCLC 668194794
- The Argonauts (Graywolf Press, 2015). OCLC 889165103
- On Freedom: Four Songs of Care and Constraint (Graywolf Press, 2021). OCLC 1257524101
- Like Love: Essays and Conversations (Graywolf Press, 2024). ISBN 978-1-64445-281-3
- Pathemata, Or, The Story of My Mouth (Wave Books, 2025). ISBN 9798891060111
- The Slicks: On Sylvia Plath and Taylor Swift (Graywolf Press, 2025). ISBN 9781644454084
