= Potentia gaudendi =

Philosophical concept

In sexuality studies, potentia gaudendi or orgasmic force is the physical and mental potential (or capacity) for pleasure in a body. The term was coined by philosopher Paul B. Preciado, who says contemporary economies exploit the body by offering services to increase pleasure—such as Viagra and cocaine—which turn it into a commodity. It is similar to jouissance in Lacanian psychoanalysis and libido in Sigmund Freud's works.

Potentia gaudendi is an important concept in Preciado's work, because it underlies his theory of "pornpower": the idea that sex and pornography is part of a larger and interlocking economic system. The ability to desire, or to withhold desire, cannot be transferred; as a result, economies are always in the process of "emotionally engaging people in order to generate value."
