= King Kong Theory =

2006 book by filmmaker and novelist Virginie Despentes

- The cover of the English-language edition, published in America in 2010 by The Feminist Press.
- Author: Virginie Despentes
- Language: French
- Genre: Essay
- Published: 2006
- Publisher: Grasset
- Publication place: France
- ISBN: 978-1-55861-657-8 (The Feminist Press edition)

King Kong Theory is a book by filmmaker and novelist Virginie Despentes, first published in French in 2006 by Grasset. English-language editions have been published in 2009 by Serpent's Tail and in 2010 by The Feminist Press (both translated by Stéphanie Benson) and in 2020 by Fitzcarraldo Editions (translated by Frank Wynne).

== Title ==
The title is a reference to the 2005 film King Kong, directed by Peter Jackson. In the first essay of the book, Despentes describes herself as "more King Kong than Kate Moss," saying she is "too aggressive, too noisy, too fat, too rough, too hairy, always too masculine." Later, in a section titled "King Kong Girl," she expands on this reading:

In this film, King Kong becomes a metaphor for sexuality before the separation of the genders politically imposed at the end of the nineteenth century. King Kong is beyond male and beyond female. It is hooked on the link between man and beast, adult and child, good and bad, primitive and civilized, black and white. It is hybrid, before the imposition of the binary. The island in the film becomes the potential for ultra-powerful, polymorphic sexuality. Just what cinema wishes to capture, display, distort, and in the end destroy.

— Page 106-107, The Feminist Press edition, 2010.

== Summary ==
The book is a blend of memoir, critical theory, and feminist manifesto. Despentes discusses a number of episodes in her life, including the reaction to the publication of her novel Baise-Moi and its subsequent film adaptation, which she directed; her time as a sex worker in Lyon and Paris; and her experience and subsequent trauma being gang-raped at the age of 17 while hitch-hiking across France. The overarching focus of the book has been described as "the ways in which our experiences of gender, power, and control are bound up in the vast, multifaceted ideology of late capitalism and our lives are organized around satisfying, or disappointing, male desire."

== Contents ==
The book is split into seven short sections or essays:

=== A Gun For Every Girl (Prologue) ===
Describing her target audience, Despentes says "I am writing as an ugly one for the ugly ones: the old hags, the dykes, the frigid, the unfucked, the unfuckables, the neurotics, the psychos, for all those girls who don't get a look in the universal market of the consumable chick." She adds that she also has sympathy for men who fall into similar categories: "I prefer the guys who don't make the cut for the simple reason that I myself often don't make it."

=== Your Ass Or Mine? ===
Despentes considers the backlash to the sexual revolution and its effect on the self-image of women. She cites early twentieth-century psychoanalyst Joan Rivière and her 1929 paper Womanliness as a Masquerade, in which Rivière discusses a nervous woman who compulsively attracts male attention as "a step toward propitiating the avenger in endeavoring to offer herself to him sexually." Despentes say this analysis helps explain "the flood of 'hooker-chic' in contemporary popular culture" (p. 19). It is a "way of apologizing, of reassuring men" that all women want is to please them, she says. She notes again how this arrangement also hurts men. "What, in fact, is required of a real man?" she asks. "The repression of emotions and the silencing of sensitivity." (p. 26)

=== She's So Depraved, You Can't Rape Her ===
Recounting being gang-raped in 1986 at the age of 17, Despentes explains how she has processed the experience since, and how society demeans and silences women who are the victim of sexual assaults. She notes that "post-rape, the acceptable response is to turn the violence inwards, onto yourself" (p. 45) and describes rape as "civil war, a political organization through which one gender declares to the other, I have complete power over you" (p. 47). She also discusses rape fantasies, suggesting that these are the result of a "specific cultural system" that primes women to connect their oppressed position within society to their sexuality. (p. 48-49).

=== Sleeping With The Enemy ===
Despentes discusses her time as a sex worker, in which she initially found clients through Minitel, a French predecessor to the internet . She says one of the things she found most difficult about the job was the "loneliness, sadness [and] fragility" of her clients (p. 61). She contrasts sex work with heterosexual relationships, noting that the former is demonized in order to "put across the idea that no woman may profit from her sexual services outside marriage (p.74) while the latter leads to more death through domestic violence. "Women who are fucked for free must continue to be told that they made the only possible choice, otherwise how can they be kept under control?" (p. 80)

=== Porno Witches ===
Pornography "hits the blind corner of reason," says Despentes, directly addressing our "primitive fantasies" and so giving the material an "almost mystical dimension" (p. 85). She discusses how censorship has shaped pornography over the years and addresses the arguments of those opposed to pornography, asking "who is in fact the victim?" (p. 93), the actors and actresses or the hypnotized audience. She notes that pornography is a "male prerogative" that only values female desire as it occurs "via the male gaze"; turning female orgasms against women "by making us feel like failures if we don't climax" (p. 96). "In the end," writes Despentes, "we are all enslaved, our sexualities confiscated, policed, normalized." (p. 101).

=== King Kong Girl ===
Despentes expands on her metaphor of the "King Kong" girl and her desire to escape the confines of femininity. She notes how critical reactions to her novel Baise-moi focused on her gender and perceived character instead of the content of her writing. "For a man, not loving women is an attitude," she notes. "For a woman, not loving men is pathological." (p. 112) Towards the end of the essay she notes: "I have come to the conclusion that femininity is the same as bootlicking. The art of servility." (p. 120)

=== Bye, Girls (Epilogue) ===
Despentes considers whether or not she would want to be a man ("I am better than that. I don't give a damn about penises," p. 132) and whether men even love women at all ("Men love other men," she declares. "They fuck each other via women," p. 133). She outlines her own ideal feminist revolution, which liberates both men and women from the current "system of forced masquerade" (p. 135), and concludes by describing feminism as "a collective adventure, for women, men, and everyone else" (p. 137).
