= Bluets (poetry collection) =

2009 book by Maggie Nelson

Bluets is a book by American author Maggie Nelson, published by Wave Books in 2009. The work hybridizes several prose and poetry styles as it documents Nelson's multifaceted experience with the color blue, and is often referred to as lyric essay or prose poetry. It was written between 2003 and 2006. The book is a philosophical and personal meditation on the color blue, lost love, grief and existential solitude. The book is full of references to other writers, philosophers and artists. The title refers to the painting Bluets by the artist Joan Mitchell.

== Structure and subject ==
Bluets is a "formal experiment" that contains an arrangement of 240 loosely-linked prose poems which Nelson refers to as "propositions". Each proposition is either a sentence or a short paragraph, none longer than two hundred words; the book totals some nineteen thousand words. The propositions are arranged neither chronologically nor thematically, but in each one, Nelson produces links between different blues and their associations. Nelson shuffled the propositions around "countless times" before arriving at their final order. The critic Thomas Larson refers to the structure as a "nomadic mosaic": "Its structure is built by pulling away from the core and by keeping attached to the core. The goal (if there is one) is nomadic, a sort of nomadic mosaic. As one reads, the book, despite its progression, loses its linearity and feels circular, porous, a tad unstable".

The three main topics that Nelson investigates within Bluets are her affinity to the color blue; the loss of her lover, whom she calls "the prince of blue"; and her relationship to a close friend rendered quadriplegic after an accident. However, most of the text is an analysis of her reading, often referring to other writers' reflections on the color blue, art, literature, philosophy, emotion and female desire. The references include Joni Mitchell, Leonard Cohen, Ralph Waldo Emerson, Sei Shōnagon, Catherine Millet, Chögyam Trungpa, Isabelle Eberhardt, John Berger, and Marguerite Duras. The exploration of the color blue is particularly inspired by Johann Wolfgang von Goethe's Theory of Colours, and Ludwig Wittgenstein's Remarks on Colour.

== Reception ==
Bluets has been referred to as a "cult favourite".

Writer and critic Hilton Als praises Bluets as a new form of classicism: "Balancing pathos with philosophy, she created a new kind of classicism, queer in content but elegant, almost cool in shape".
