= Paul B. Preciado =

Spanish writer, philosopher and curator (born 1970)

Paul Preciado
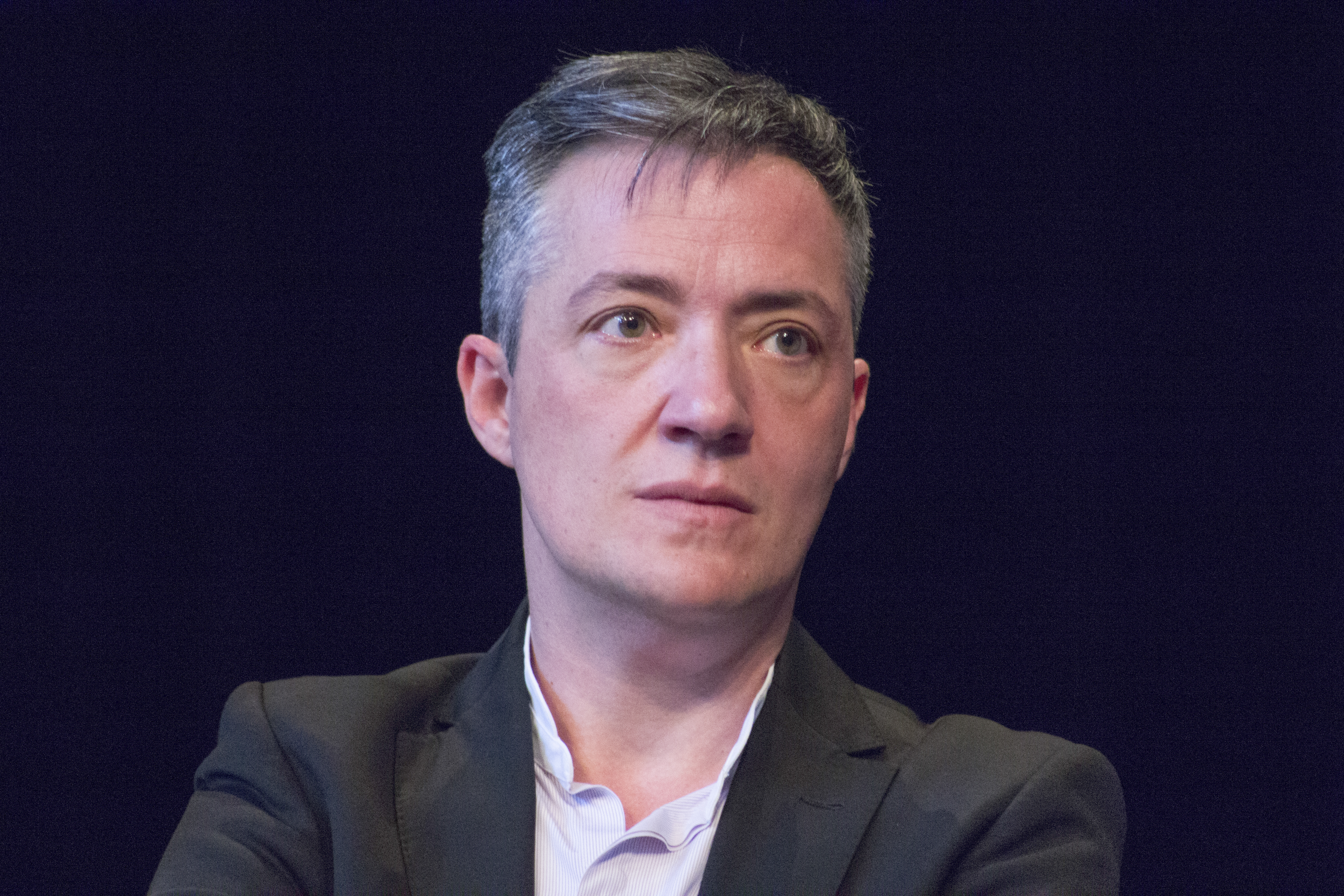
- Preciado in 2017
- Born: 11 September 1970 (age 56); Burgos, Spain

Education
- Education: New School (MA); Princeton University (PhD)

Philosophical work
- Era: 21st-century philosophy
- Region: Western philosophy
- School: Continental philosophy
- Main interests: Sexuality, gender identity, history of technology
- Notable ideas: The pharmaco-pornographic regime

Paul B. Preciado (formerly Beatriz Preciado; born 11 September 1970) is a Spanish writer, philosopher and curator whose work focuses on identity, gender, pornography, architecture and sexuality. In 2010, Preciado began a process of "slow transition" where he started taking testosterone to medically transition. From this point on he has publicly considered himself transgender as well as a feminist.

== Career ==
Preciado came to The New School in New York from Spain on a Fulbright scholarship to get an MA in philosophy. Jacques Derrida and Agnes Heller became mentors to Preciado. Despite taking a short gap during the spring of his first year at The New School, Preciado maintained close relations with many professors. In 1999, Derrida, one of Preciado's professors, invited Preciado to teach a seminar in Paris on forgiveness and the gift during transformation. After transitioning into his professional career, Preciado and his new partner, Alberto Perez, began to hold empowerment forums in impoverished communities.

Later, he came back to the United States to complete his PhD in Philosophy and Theory of Architecture at Princeton University, writing a dissertation called, Pornotopía: Architecture and Sexuality in Playboy During the Cold War in 2010, which in book form later won the Sade Prize in France.

Since January 2013, Preciado has regularly contributed to French newspaper Libération′s website, in a column about gender, sexuality, love and biopower.

Preciado was professor of Political History of the Body, Gender Theory, and History of Performance at Paris 8 University and was the director of the Independent Studies Program (PEI) of the Museum of Contemporary Art of Barcelona (MACBA). He was Curator of Public Programs of documenta 14, Kassel and Athens.

In 2023, he directed the documentary film Orlando, My Political Biography. The film was screened at the 73rd Berlin International Film Festival in festival's Encounter section on 18 February 2023, where it was awarded a Special Jury Prize. The film received a special jury mention in the Best Documentary Film category and also received the Teddy Award for best documentary.

In 2023, ArtReview named Preciado the 22nd most influential person in the contemporary art world, describing his work as "a mainstay reference for the artworld".

== Testo Junkie (2008) ==
In 2008, the book Testo Junkie: Sex, Drugs, and Biopolitics in the Pharmacopornographic Era, relating Preciado's experience self-administering testosterone, was published in Spain (as Testo yonqui) and in France. The work was later translated into English in 2013. This edition was a finalist for the 2014 Lambda Literary Award for Transgender Nonfiction.

Preciado says that the book is "not a memoir" but "a body-essay" and a work of autotheory. It is a partial homage to French writer Guillaume Dustan (referred to as "GD" in the book), a close friend of Preciado's who contracted HIV and died of an accidental overdose. Preciado investigates the politicization of the body by what he terms "pharmacopornographic capitalism" and describes the act of taking testosterone as both political and performative, aiming to undo a notion of gender encoded in the body by a system of sexuality and contraception.

In the work, Preciado describes and analyses the changes provoked by the testosterone from the point of view of his relationship with Virginie Despentes (referred to as "VD" in the book). Testo Junkie also deals with the political aspect of other drugs that transform the body, such as birth control pills, Viagra and Prozac.

According to Preciado, all sexual bodies become intelligible according to a common "pharmacopornographic matrix". For Preciado, there is no such thing as gender outside of a technological context, with technology here understood in broad sense.

== Can the Monster Speak? ==
On 17 November 2019, Preciado gave a speech before the École de la Cause Freudienne (School of the Freudian Cause)—a society of Lacanian psychoanalysts—in which he described his life as a trans man and challenged the precepts of psychoanalysis. Preciado claims that he faced booing and heckling, and was only able to read a quarter of his prepared speech before he was told his time had run out. The complete text of the speech was later published as a small book.

In the speech, Preciado considers himself as an object of the audience's medical gaze, likening himself to Red Peter—a character in the Franz Kafka short story "A Report to an Academy" who begins life as an ape, learns human speech and gives an account of himself at a scientific conference—and Frankenstein's monster. Preciado claims that the practice and concepts of psychoanalysis (and its medicalization of transgender people) are not based in scientific objectivity, but instead reflect the heteronormative worldview of the white men who founded and practice the discipline. In the second half of the text, Preciado makes three observations. He claims that the gender binary informing psychoanalysis is not an intrinsic property of reality, but is simply a current historical view which was preceded by earlier paradigms. Preciado cites Hippocrates, Galen and Vesalius to claim the existence of a previous "one-sex" model of humanity in which men and women existed on a continuum, with each being simply the superior and the inferior instances of organisms in the same one species. Second, Preciado notes that psychology and medicine invented vocabulary throughout the twentieth century (e.g. transsexual, intersex) to describe exceptions to the notion of the gender binary, and also to pathologize them while preserving the disciplines' paradigmatic frameworks. Third, Preciado predicts the increased problematization of gender throughout the twenty-first century, and therefore called on the society to revise its psychoanalytic premises.

== Personal life ==
Preciado announced in 2014 that he was transitioning, and in January 2015 declared that his name would be legally changed to Paul. Preciado dated French writer-director Virginie Despentes from 2005 to 2014.

== Publications ==
- Manifeste contre-sexual. Balland. 2000.
  - Countersexual manifesto. Columbia University Press. 2018. Translated by Kevin Gerry Dunn.
- Testo yonqui. Espasa-Calpe. 2008.
  - Testo junkie: sex, drugs, and biopolitics in the pharmacopornographic era. The Feminist Press at the City University of New York. 2013.
- Pornotopía: arquitectura y sexualidad en «Playboy» durante la guerra fría. Editorial Anagrama. 2010.
  - Pornotopia: an essay on Playboy's architecture and biopolitics. New York: Zone Books. 2014. Translated by Bruce Benderson.
- "The pharmaco-pornographic regime: sex, gender, and subjectivity in the age of punk capitalism" in Susan Stryker and Aren Z. Aizura (eds.), The Transgender Studies Reader 2. Routledge. 2013.
- Un appartement sur Uranus. Éditions Grasset. 2019.
  - An apartment on Uranus. Fitzcarraldo Editions. 2020. Translated by Charlotte Mandell.
- Je suis un monstre qui vous parle: rapport pour une académie de psychanalystes. Éditions Grasset. 2020.
  - Can the monster speak?: a report to an academy of psychoanalysts. London: Fitzcarraldo Editions. 2021.Translated by Frank Wynne.
- Dysphoria mundi: el sonido del mundo derrumbándose. Editorial Anagrama. 2022.
  - Dysphoria mundi: a diary of planetary Ttansition. Minneapolis: Graywolf Press. 2025.

== Art and curatorial work ==
- La International Cuir (2011, curator). Museo Nacional Centro de Arte Reina Sofía, Spain.
- PRO-CHOICE (2013, participant). Kunsthalle Friart Fribourg, Switzerland. Curated by Petunia.
- La Pasión Según Carol Rama (2014, co-curator with Teresa Grandas). Barcelona Museum of Contemporary Art, Spain.

== Filmography ==
- Orlando, My Political Biography (2023)
