= Rae Bryant =

American writer (born 1972)

- Born: 1972 (age 53–54); Marietta, Ohio
- Occupations: Author, editor
- Website: www.raebryant.com

Rae Bryant is an American writer most known for experimental prose styles with a focus on magic realism, surrealism, satire and postfeminism. Her story collection, The Indefinite State of Imaginary Morals, was nominated for the Hemingway Foundation/PEN Award and Pushcart Prize.

Bryant has received fellowships and grants from the Virginia Center for the Creative Arts and Johns Hopkins University, where she teaches creative writing and multimedia and is the founding editor of The Doctor T. J. Eckleburg Review, a literary and arts journal housed at Johns Hopkins. Bryant has also taught creative writing and multimedia at the University of Iowa's International Writing Program.

Her short fiction, creative nonfiction, and multimedia have published in numerous literary magazines including StoryQuarterly, McSweeney's Internet Tendency, Gargoyle Magazine, Blip Magazine, and Redivider, among others.

Bryant lives in the DC/Baltimore area with her husband and two children.

== Selected works ==
- The Indefinite State of Imaginary Morals (Patasola Press, 2011)
- "Good Girl" (2012) StoryQuarterly/
- "An Open Letter to a Suicidal Friend, a Bulimic Friend, a Long Lost Aunt, and Stephanie, Your New Linked In Connection" (2012) McSweeney's Internet Tendency
- "A Love Letter to Steven Tyler's Lips" (2012) Gargoyle
- "The Cutting Down Is a Conceit" Redivider
