= The End of the Story =

1995 novel by Lydia Davis

- Author: Lydia Davis
- Language: English
- Genre: Fiction
- Published: February 1995
- Publisher: Farrar, Straus and Giroux
- Publication place: United States
- Pages: 192
- ISBN: 0-374-14381-1

The End of the Story is a novel by American author Lydia Davis, published by Farrar, Straus and Giroux in 1995. The author's only such title to date, it follows an unnamed writer who reflects on the development and aftermath of a romantic relation between herself and a man twelve years younger than her, and endeavors to write a novel based on that experience. Expanding from a 1983 piece entitled "Story", the finished work derived from two competing drafts, and features sections in place of traditional chapters. Reception was mixed to positive during and after its release; reviewers and scholars commented on its self-reflexive and essay-like attributes.

== Plot ==
A 34-year-old female East Coast writer and translator, who moves to the West Coast for a teaching job, has an affair with a financially challenged 22-year-old poet; neither of them bear given names in the text. The novel begins—and ends—with a scene depicting her last time seeing this former lover, and then her last, unsuccessful attempt at finding him. A few years later, the narrator—now married and in her forties—is processing her memories of the relation for her novel.

That seemed to be the end of the story, and for a while it was also the end of the novel — there was something so final about the bitter cup of tea. Then, although it was still the end of the story, I put it at the beginning of the novel, as if I needed to tell the end first in order to go on and tell the rest. It would have been simpler to begin at the beginning, but the beginning didn't mean much without what came after, and what came after didn't mean much without the end.

The plot then follows her efforts to encapsulate the love affair and subsequent breakup in writing. Amid her creative uncertainty, she describes her project thus:

If someone asks me what the novel is about, I say it's about a lost man, because I don't know what to say. But it's true that for a long time now I have not known where he is, after first knowing and then not knowing, knowing again, and then losing him again.

In order to complete it, the narrator embarks on manipulating moments from the affair whose circumstances offer her no easy answers, and engages in an "act of ceremony" to remedy the multiple open endings she has collected in the process.

== Background and development ==
The End of the Story was the first novel from Lydia Davis, and has remained her only one as of 2022. Its precursor, "Story", was the title piece from her 1983 short-story collection, and was reprinted as the opening segment of 1986 follow-up Break It Down. The novel also references another two earlier works of hers, "The Mouse" and "The Letter".

Davis created several drafts for The End of the Story, two of which ended up under active consideration: "Novel I" chronologically detailed the love affair, while "Novel II" was a side story in diary form about the narrator's efforts to write about it. After a number of rewrites, and with help from narrative diagrams, the more promising "Novel II" borrowed elements from "Novel I" to form the final version of her work. Davis' book is divided into sections in lieu of traditional numbered chapters, and according to Christopher J. Knight, features an order "so architectonic or hypertextlike [that it] confounds the expectations of the ordinary novel reader."

== Themes ==
"A principal theme" of The End of the Story, wrote Karen Alexander in 2008, "is the relationship between a story and its novelistic rendering." Julie Tanner of literary-criticism outlet Post45 saw the title as a metaphor for the narrator's increasing challenges and distractions while working on her novel, and added that Davis touched on the same motifs surrounding the writing process as in her other works. Textual Practice contributor Josh Cohen said in 2010, "Like the affair it stutteringly narrates, the novel can only be thought in terms of its own failure to fulfil itself." Cohen, as well as Alexander, also commented on the book's exploration of memory.

Anne McConnell of Comparative Literature Studies found The End of the Story's narrative style reminiscent of Marguerite Duras' The Malady of Death (1982), as well as the female character's relationship and bar scene therein. In regards to the narrator's decision to modify or leave out parts of her novel for length, she remarked: "Such a description challenges the notion of an author as authority, or decision-maker, since the novel seems to scoff at the narrator's attempts to get involved."

== Reception ==
Reviews of The End of the Story were mixed to positive. In its December 1994 issue, Kirkus said, "For all the good and clever writing, the story remains a neat idea without much emotional wattage." Charlotte Innes of The New York Times Book Review had similar reservations on its 1995 publication, feeling that The End did not live up to Break It Down's potential despite glimmers of "psychological truth". "By the end of her story," she said, "one feels only relief at being rid of the narrator and her obsession with an old love affair....[which is] not that remarkable to begin with".

Contrarily, Bruce Hainley of The Village Voice called it a "brilliant" debut, adding: "To say Davis has written a novel about writing (a novel) may make it sound coyly 'postmodern,' which would be dreary, and this is not at all the case. Davis's work is more self-meditative than self-reflexive". Positive reviews also came from The New Yorker and The Times Literary Supplement (both of which likened it to an essay), as well as the London Review of Books. Writing for the Journal of Narrative Theory in 2008, Knight retrospectively deemed The End of the Story "a masterpiece of late twentieth-century American fiction" with self-reflexive attributes.

== Legacy ==
In the years after The End of the Story's publication, Davis would hint at writing another novel styled after a French grammar book, which would take cues from Break It Down's "French Lesson I: Le Meurtre". By 2016, however, she reported that the idea had gotten "very old" and was "still there somewhere on the back burner."
