= Brice Matthieussent =

French literary translator (born 1950)

- Born: 1950 (age 75–76)
- Education: École Nationale Supérieure des Mines de Paris
- Occupations: Academic, literary translator

Brice Matthieussent (born 1950) is a French literary translator. He has translated over 200 novels from English into French. He won the 2013 Prix Jules Janin from the Académie française for his translations of the works of Jim Harrison.

== Early life ==
Brice Matthieussent was born in 1950. He graduated from the École Nationale Supérieure des Mines de Paris in 1973, and he earned a doctorate in philosophy in 1977.

== Career ==
Matthieussent is the director of the "Fictives" collection for Christian Bourgois éditeur, a French publishing company, since 1990. He has been a professor of Aesthetics at the École supérieure d'art et de design Marseille-Méditerranée in Marseille since 2004.

Matthieussent has translated over 200 books from English into French, including the works of Jim Harrison, Paul Bowles, Bret Easton Ellis, Robert McLiam Wilson and William T. Vollmann. He won the 2013 Jules Janin from the Académie française for his translations of Jim Harrison.

Matthieussent is the author of one novel. He is also a contributor to art press and Le Magazine Littéraire.

== Works ==
- Matthieussent, Brice (2009). Vengeance du traducteur. Paris: P.O.L. ISBN 9782846823340. OCLC 963826529.
