= The Argonauts =

2015 nonfiction book Maggie Nelson

- Author: Maggie Nelson
- Language: English
- Genre: Autotheory
- Publisher: Graywolf Press
- Publication date: 2015
- Publication place: United States
- Media type: Print
- Pages: 160
- Award: National Book Critics Circle Award for Criticism (2015)
- ISBN: 978-1555977078

The Argonauts is a book by poet and critic Maggie Nelson, published in 2015. It mixes philosophical theory with memoir.

== Contents ==
The book discusses Nelson's romantic relationship with the transgender artist Harry Dodge and her experience being pregnant with her son Iggy, as well as topics like the death of a parent, transgender embodiment, academia, familial relationships, and the limitations of language. Told in non-chronological vignettes interspersed with quotations, the book also explores and criticizes ideas from several philosophers including Gilles Deleuze, Judith Butler and Eve Kosofsky Sedgwick.

The title is a reference to Roland Barthes' idea that to love someone is similar to an Argonaut who constantly replaces parts of their ship without the ship changing names.

== Awards ==
The Argonauts won the National Book Critics Circle Award for Criticism in 2015. It was nominated for the Goodreads Choice Award for autobiography in 2015, the Folio Prize in 2017, and was a finalist for the Leslie Feinberg Award for Trans and Gender-Variant Literature in 2016.
