= Ira Silverberg =

American editor and writing consultant

- Born: 1963 (age 62–63); The Bronx, New York, US
- Education: CUNY Urban Legal Studies Center; University of Kansas
- Occupations: Literary agent, editor

Ira Silverberg is an American editor, writer, and director of Broadview Arts Management, a consultancy working with writers, artists, publishers, arts funders, and non-profit arts organizations. He is a member of the adjunct faculty of the MFA Writing Program at Columbia University. He has worked in publishing as a literary agent; editor-in-chief of Grove Press; co-founder of High Risk Books/Serpent's Tail, and as Literature Director of the National Endowment for the Arts.

== Early life and education ==
Silverberg was born and raised in the Bronx, New York. After graduating from Bronx High School of Science in 1980, he attended the CUNY Urban Legal Studies Center: a six-year BA/JD Program designed to teach lawyers to serve underserved urban communities. While attending CUNY, he met James Grauerholz (a friend and assistant of William Burroughs) at a bar in the East Village. They began a romantic relationship and Grauerholz convinced Silverberg to move to Kansas, where they lived and wrote with Burroughs and other aging beat poets. Silverberg attended the University of Kansas from 1982 to 1984. In 1984, he returned to New York and attended Hunter College. He dropped out of college at age 22, one semester short of a degree.

== Career ==
Silverberg began going to "downtown" New York nightclubs as a high-school student. In 1984, he began his career as a part-time editorial and publicity assistant at The Overlook Press after meeting founder Peter Mayer at a 25th-anniversary party of Jack Kerouac's On the Road in Boulder, Colorado, two years earlier. Silverberg was also a doorman at the Limelight nightclub,

He worked to establish Serpent's Tail in the United States by publishing locally originated books; the first was the fiction collection, Disorderly Conduct: The VLS Fiction Reader, edited by The Village Voice Literary Supplement (VLS) editor M. Mark. Silverberg and Amy Scholder began co-editing the High Risk series in 1994. He returned to Grove Press, where he had been Publicity Director as the Editor-in-Chief after leaving Serpent's Tail. He joined Donadio & Olson in 1997, becoming a partner, and was foreign-rights director at Sterling Lord Literistic from 2008 to 2011.

Silverberg was appointed literature director of the National Endowment for the Arts in Washington, D.C. in 2011, a post he held until 2013. In 2013, he received the Michele Karlsberg Leadership Award from the Publishing Triangle.
