= Lydia Davis =

American writer (born 1947)

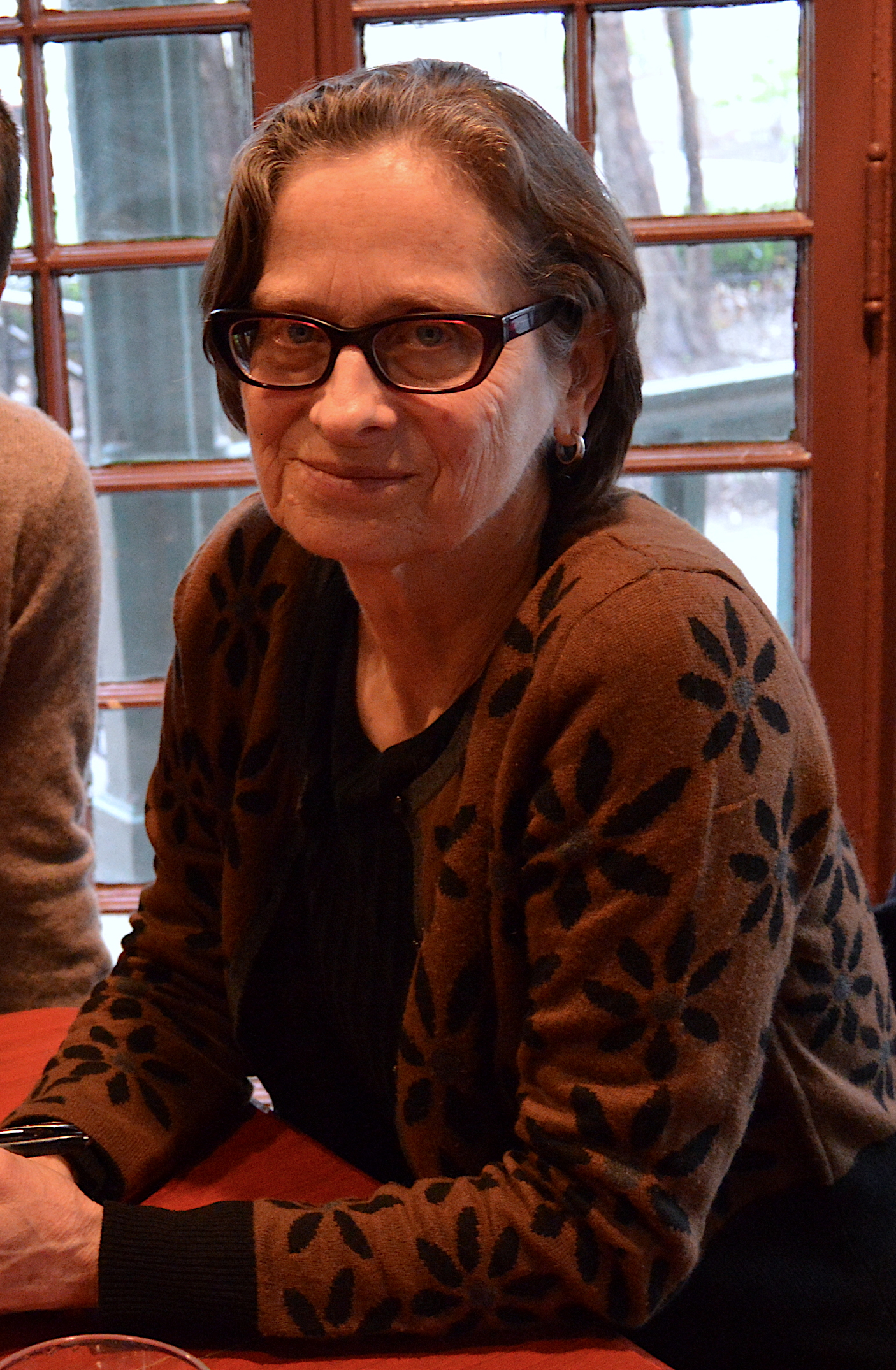
- Davis in 2017
- Born: July 15, 1947 (age 79); Northampton, Massachusetts, U.S.
- Education: Barnard College
- Occupation: Writer
- Spouses: Paul Auster (m. 1974; div. 1977) Alan Cote
- Children: 2
- Relatives: Robert Gorham Davis (father); Hope Hale Davis (mother); Claudia Cockburn (half-sister)
- Writing career
- Period: 1976–present
- Genres: Short story, novel, essay

Lydia Davis (born July 15, 1947) is an American short story writer, novelist, essayist, poet, and translator from French and other languages, who often writes very short stories. Davis has produced several new translations of French literary classics, including Swann's Way by Marcel Proust and Madame Bovary by Gustave Flaubert.

== Early life and education ==
Davis was born in Northampton, Massachusetts, on July 15, 1947. She is the daughter of Robert Gorham Davis, a critic and professor of English, and Hope Hale Davis, a short-story writer, teacher, and memoirist. Davis initially studied music, first piano, then violin, which was her first love. On becoming a writer, Davis has said, "I was probably always headed to being a writer, even though that wasn't my first love. I guess I must have always wanted to write in some part of me or I wouldn't have done it." From fifth to eighth grade, she attended The Brearley School in New York City. She attended high school at The Putney School, graduating in 1965. She studied at Barnard College, and at that time she mostly wrote poetry.

In 1974, Davis married Paul Auster, with whom she had a son named Daniel (1977–2022). Auster and Davis later divorced; Davis is now married to the artist Alan Cote, with whom she has another son, Theo Cote. She is a professor emerita at the University at Albany, SUNY, and was a Lillian Vernon Distinguished Writer-in-Residence at New York University in 2012.

== Career ==
Davis has published six collections of fiction, including The Thirteenth Woman and Other Stories (1976) and Break It Down (1986), a finalist for the PEN/Hemingway Award. Her most recent collections were Varieties of Disturbance, a finalist for the National Book Award published by Farrar, Straus and Giroux in 2007, and Can't and Won't (2013). The Collected Stories of Lydia Davis (2009) contains all her short fiction up to 2008.

Davis has also translated Proust, Flaubert, Blanchot, Foucault, Michel Butor, Michel Leiris, Pierre Jean Jouve and other French writers, as well as Belgian novelist Conrad Detrez and the Dutch writer A. L. Snijders.

She has written one novel, The End of the Story, which was published in 1995 by Farrar, Straus and Giroux.

== Reception and influence ==
Davis has been described as "the master of a literary form largely of her own invention." Some of her "stories" are only one or two sentences. Davis has compared these works to skyscrapers in the sense that they are surrounded by an imposing blank expanse. Writing in the Los Angeles Review of Books, Michael LaPointe goes so far as to say while "Lydia Davis did not invent flash fiction, ... she is so far and away its most eminent contemporary practitioner". Her "distinctive voice has never been easy to fit into conventional categories," writes Kasia Boddy in the Columbia Companion to the 21st Century Short Story. Boddy writes: "Davis's parables are most successful when they examine the problems of communication between men and women, and the strategies each uses to interpret the other's words and actions." Of contemporary authors, only Davis, Stuart Dybek, and Alice Fulton share the distinction of appearing in both The Best American Short Stories and The Best American Poetry series.

In October 2003, Davis received a MacArthur Fellowship. She was elected a fellow of the American Academy of Arts and Sciences in 2005. Davis was a distinguished speaker at the 2004 &NOW Festival at the University of Notre Dame. Davis was announced as the winner of the 2013 Man Booker International Prize on May 22, 2013. The official announcement of Davis's award on the Man Booker Prize website described her work as having "the brevity and precision of poetry." The judging panel chair Christopher Ricks commented, "There is vigilance to her stories, and great imaginative attention. Vigilance as how to realise things down to the very word or syllable; vigilance as to everybody's impure motives and illusions of feeling." Davis won £60,000 as part of the biennial award. She is widely considered "one of the most original minds in American fiction today."

Davis declined to sell her book Our Strangers on Amazon.

Her collection The Collected Stories of Lydia Davis was listed as one of the "100 Best Books of the 21st Century" by The New York Times.

=== Awards ===
- 1986 PEN/Hemingway Award finalist, for Break It Down
- 1988 Whiting Award for Fiction
- "St. Martin," a short story that first appeared in Grand Street, was included in The Best American Short Stories 1997.
- 1997 Guggenheim Fellowship
- 1998 Lannan Literary Award for Fiction
- 1999 Chevalier de l'Ordre des Arts et des Lettres for fiction and translation.
- "Betrayal," a short-short story that first appeared in Hambone, was included in The Best American Poetry 1999
- "A Mown Lawn," a short-short-story that first appeared in McSweeney's, was included in The Best American Poetry 2001
- 2003 MacArthur Fellows Program
- 2007 National Book Award Fiction finalist, for Varieties of Disturbance: Stories
- "Men," a short-short story that first appeared in 32 Poems, was included in The Best American Poetry 2008
- 2013 American Academy of Arts and Letters' Award of Merit Medal
- 2013 Philolexian Society Award for Distinguished Literary Achievement
- 2013 Man Booker International Prize
- 2020 PEN/Malamud Award

== Selected works ==
- The Thirteenth Woman and Other Stories, Living Hand, 1976
- Sketches for a Life of Wassilly. Station Hill Press. 1981. ISBN 978-0-930794-45-3.
- Story and Other Stories. The Figures. 1983. ISBN 978-0-935724-17-2.
- Break It Down. Farrar Straus & Giroux. 1986. ISBN 0-374-11653-9.
- The End of the Story. Farrar Straus & Giroux. 1995. ISBN 978-0-374-14831-7. OL ia:endofstory00davi. (novel)
- Almost No Memory. Farrar Straus & Giroux. 1997. ISBN 978-0-374-10281-4.
- Samuel Johnson Is Indignant. McSweeney's. 2001. ISBN 978-0-9703355-9-3.
- Varieties of Disturbance. Farrar Straus & Giroux. May 15, 2007. ISBN 978-0-374-28173-1.
- Proust, Blanchot, and a Woman in Red. Center for Writers and Translators. 2007. ISBN 9780955296352.
- The Collected Stories of Lydia Davis. Farrar, Straus & Giroux. 2009. ISBN 978-0-374-27060-5.
- The Cows. Sarabande Books. 2011. ISBN 9781932511932. (republished in Can't and Won't)
- Lydia Davis: Documenta Series 078. Hatje Cantz. 2012. ISBN 9783775729277
- Two American Scenes. New Directions. 2013. ISBN 9780811220415. (co-written with Eliot Weinberger)
- Can't and Won't: Stories. Farrar, Straus and Giroux. 2014. ISBN 9780374118587.
- Essays One. Farrar, Straus and Giroux. 2019. ISBN 9780374148850.
- Essays Two. Farrar, Straus and Giroux. 2021. ISBN 9780374148867.
- Our Strangers: Stories. Bookshop Editions. 2023. ISBN 9798987717103.
- Into the Weeds. Yale University Press, 2025. ISBN 9780300279740

=== Anthologies ===
- Bill Henderson, ed. (1989). The Pushcart prize: best of the small presses. Pushcart Press. ISBN 978-0-916366-58-2.
- E. Annie Proulx, Katrina Kenison, ed. (1997). "St. Martin". The Best American Short Stories 1997. Houghton Mifflin. ISBN 978-0-395-79866-9.
- Robert Hass; David Lehman, eds. (2001). "A Mown Lawn". The Best American Poetry 2001. Simon and Schuster. p. 67. ISBN 978-0-7432-0384-5. "Lydia Davis."
- Charles Wright; David Lehman, eds. (2008). "Men". The Best American Poetry 2008. Simon and Schuster. ISBN 978-0-7432-9975-6.

=== Selected translations ===
- Jean Chesneaux, Françoise Le Barbier, Marie-Claire Bergère (1977). China from the 1911 Revolution to Liberation. Translators Paul Auster and Lydia Davis. Pantheon Books.
- Georges Simenon (1979). Aboard the Aquitaine (Simenon African Trio). Translators Paul Auster and Lydia Davis. Harcourt Brace Jovanovich. ISBN 0-15-103955-0.
- Claude Nori (1979). French Photography, from Its Origins to the Present. Translator Lydia Davis. Pantheon Press.
- Attilio Colombo (1979). Fantastic Photographs. Translator Lydia Davis. Pantheon Books.
- Maurice Blanchot (1981). P. Adams Sitney (ed.). The Gaze of Orpheus, and Other Literary Essays. Translator Lydia Davis. Station Hill Press. ISBN 978-0930794378.
- Joseph Joubert (1983). Paul Auster (ed.). The Notebooks of Joseph Joubert. Translator Paul Auster. North Point Press. ISBN 0865471088. (Davis translated the 19-page afterword by Maurice Blanchot, "Joubert et l'espace.")
- Conrad Detrez (1984). A Weed for Burning. Translator Lydia Davis. Harcourt Brace Jovanovich.
- Michel Butor (1986). The Spirit of Mediterranean Places. Translator Lydia Davis. Marlboro Press.
- Conrad Detrez (1986). Zone of Fire. Translator Lydia Davis. Harcourt Brace Jovanovich.
- Françoise Giroud (1986). Marie Curie: A Life. Translator Lydia Davis. Holmes & Meier. ISBN 0841909776.
- Maurice Blanchot (1987). The Last Man. Translator Lydia Davis. Columbia University Press.
- André Jardin (1988). Tocqueville: A Biography. Translator Lydia Davis. Farrar Straus Giroux. ISBN 0374521905.
- Michel Leiris (1989). Brisées: Broken Branches. Translator Lydia Davis. North Point Press.
- Pierre Jean Jouve (1996). The Desert World. Translator Lydia Davis. Marlboro Press. ISBN 978-0810160187.
- Pierre Jean Jouve (1997). Hecate: The Adventure of Catherine Crachat: I. Translator Lydia Davis. Marlboro Press. ISBN 978-0810160385.
- Michel Leiris (1991) The Rules of the Game: Scratches. Translator Lydia Davis. Paragon House.
- Pierre Jean Jouve (1993). Hélène. Translator Lydia Davis. Marlboro Press.
- Michel Leiris (1997) The Rules of the Game: Scraps. Translator Lydia Davis. Johns Hopkins University Press.
- Michel Leiris (2017) The Rules of the Game: Fibrils. Translator Lydia Davis. Yale University Press.
- Marcel Proust (2004). Lydia Davis; Christopher Prendergast (eds.). Swann's Way. Translated by Lydia Davis. Penguin Books. ISBN 978-0-14-243796-4.
- Vivant Denon (2009). Peter Brooks (ed.). No Tomorrow. Translated by Lydia Davis. New York Review of Books. ISBN 978-1-59017-326-8.
- Gustave Flaubert (2010). Lydia Davis (ed.). Madame Bovary. Translated by Lydia Davis. Viking Adult. ISBN 978-0-670-02207-6.
- Ollivant, Alfred (2014). Bob, Son of Battle: The Last Gray Dog of Kenmuir. New York Review Children's Collection. Translated by Lydia Davis. ISBN 9781590177297.
- Snijders, A.L. (2016). Grasses and Trees. Translated by Lydia Davis. AFDH. ISBN 9789072603586.
- Snijders, A.L. (2021). Night Train. Translated by Lydia Davis. New Directions.
