= Autotheory =

Type of literary tradition

Autotheory is a literary tradition involving the combination of the narrative forms of autobiography, memoir, and critical theory. Works of autotheory involve a first-person account of an author’s life blended with research investigations. Works of autotheory might bring in broader questions in philosophy, literary theory, social structures, science and culture to interpret the politics and history within personal experiences.

Discussions surrounding Paul B. Preciado's 2013 book Testo Junkie popularized the term.

Lauren Fournier suggests autotheory is rooted in creative and critical practice in feminist contexts. Fournier describes autotheory as a site of resistance, where feminist writers, artists, and scholars brought political questions to bear in their own lives, in contrast to the situated distance between the writer and their subject matter or absence of the writer in their work that is prominent in academic research across disciplines. Ralph Clare suggests autotheory is adjacent to the literary movement autofiction, but distinct in that it is a direct response and form of resistance to the institutionalization of theory.

== Notable works ==
- Audre Lorde, The Cancer Journals, 1980
- Audre Lorde, Zami: A New Spelling of My Name, 1982
- Audre Lorde, "Poetry Is Not A Luxury," 1985
- Gloria Anzaldúa, Borderlands/La Frontera, 1987
- bell hooks, Teaching to Transgress: Education as the Practice of Freedom, 1994
- Chris Kraus, I Love Dick, Semiotext(e), 1997
- Eve Kosofsky Sedgwick, A Dialogue on Love, 1999
- Saidiya Hartman, Lose Your Mother, Farrar, Straus and Giroux, 2008
- Saidiya Hartman, Venus in Two Acts, Duke University Press, 2008
- Paul Preciado, Testo Junkie, 2008
- Maggie Nelson, The Argonauts, 2015
- Sara Ahmed, Living a Feminist Life, Duke University Press, 2017
- Seo-Young Chu, "A Refuge for Jae-in Doe: Fugues in the Key of English Major," 2017
- Keeanga-Yamahtta Taylor, How We Get Free: Black Feminism and the Combahee River Collective, Haymarket Books, 2017
- Ellen Samuels, "Six Ways of Looking At Crip Time," 2017
- Chanel Miller, Know My Name, 2019
- Arianne Zwartjes, "Under the Skin: An Exploration of Autotheory," 2019
- Sara Ahmed, Queer Phenomenology, Duke University Press, 2020
- Frank Wilderson III, Afropessimism, Liveright, 2020
- Cathy Park Hong, Minor Feelings: An Asian American Reckoning, 2020
- Magda Cârneci, Fem, 2021
- Karla Cornejo Villavicencio, The Undocumented Americans, One World, 2021
- Christina Sharpe, Ordinary Notes, 2023
- David Kishik, Self Study: Notes on the Schizoid Condition, ICI Berlin Press, 2023
