= Virginie Despentes =

French author and filmmaker

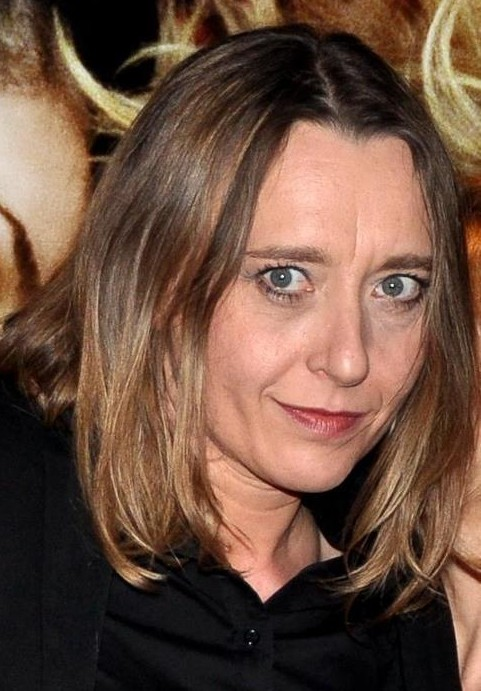
- Despentes in March 2012
- Born: 13 June 1969 (age 57); Nancy, France
- Occupations: Novelist; director; screenwriter, actor
- Writing career
- Language: French
- Years active: 1993–present

Virginie Despentes (French: [viʁ.ʒi.ni de.pɑ̃t]; born 13 June 1969) is a French author, screenwriter, director, and actor. She is known for her work exploring gender, sexuality, poverty, and marginalization.

== Life and career ==
Virginie Despentes was born Virginie Daget in 1969. She grew up in Nancy, France, in a working-class family. Her parents were postal workers. At age 15, she was admitted to a psychiatric hospital against her will by her parents. She later noted: "I’m sure now that I would never have been locked up if I had been born a boy."

When she was age 17, Despentes left her home and abandoned her schooling. As a teenager, she was a hitchhiker and followed rock bands. While hitchhiking with a friend at age 17, Despentes was threatened by three young men with a rifle and then gang-raped.

Despentes settled in Lyon, where she worked as a maid, a prostitute in "massage parlors" and peep shows, a sales clerk in a record store, a freelance rock journalist, and a pornographic film critic.

In 1993, her first book Baise-moi was published. The book focuses on two female sex workers who go on a killing spree after one of them is gang-raped. For the book, she used the pen name Despentes, which was inspired by La Croix-Rousse, her old neighbourhood in Lyon (the neighbourhood was hilly; "des pentes" translates to "from the hills"). She chose to use a pen name to distance the book from her family.

Despentes then moved to Paris. In 2000, she directed the film Baise-moi, an adaptation of her own novel, co-directed with former pornographic actor Coralie Trinh Thi. It stars Karen Lancaume and Raffaëla Anderson. Baise-moi has been described as an example of a rape and revenge film. After the release of the 1993 novel and the film adaptation, she became highly controversial.

Her novel Les Jolies Choses was adapted for the screen in 2001 by Gilles Paquet-Brenner, with Marion Cotillard and Stomy Bugsy in the lead roles. The film was awarded the Prix Michel d'Ornano at the 2001 Deauville American Film Festival.

From 2004 to 2005, she wrote a blog that documented her daily life. Around this time she began identifying as a lesbian and started dating Spanish philosopher Paul B. Preciado (before he had transitioned to male).

In 2005, she wrote three songs for the album Va Chercher la Police for the group A.S. Dragon.

In 2006, she published the non-fiction work King Kong Theory. It recounts her experiences in the French sex industry as well as the infamy and praise she experienced for writing Baise-Moi.

In 2009, she directed the documentary Mutantes (Féminisme Porno Punk), broadcast on Pink TV.

In 2010, her seventh novel, Apocalypse Bébé, was awarded the Prix Renaudot. It was translated in 2013 by Siân Reynolds.

Also in 2010, Cecilia Backes and Salima Boutebal produced a stage adaptation of King Kong Theory for the "Off" Festival d'Avignon. Bye Bye Blondie was adapted into a film starring Béatrice Dalle and Emmanuelle Béart in 2011.

The English translation of her novel Vernon Subutex 1 was shortlisted for the 2018 Man Booker International Prize.

On 18 August 2023, she was a guest celebrity judge in the episode of the Drag Race France season 2 titled Showtime!, broadcast on France.tv Slash.

== Work and reception ==
Despentes' work portrays youth marginalization; it pertains to the sexual revolution lived by Generation X and to the acclimation of pornography in public spaces through new communication techniques. With explorations of the limits of obscenity as a novelist and filmmaker she proposes social critiques and antidotes to the current moral order. Her characters deal with misery and injustice, self-harm including drug addiction, and violence towards others such as rape or terrorism. She is one of the most popular French authors of the contemporary era.

For years after the release of her 1993 novel Rape Me, she was depicted by French literary institutions as an outsider or "enfant terrible", and drew criticism from both the political left and right. Later works such as Apocalypse Bébé (2010) and the Vernon Subutex trilogy (2015–17) received positive reviews.

In 2018, Lauren Elkin discussed her early dislike of Despentes and other writers such as Kathy Acker, writing about Rape Me: "There was an anger and a sarcasm in the writing that I turned away from." She notes that critics also "derided Despentes for lacking a 'literary style'". Elkin praises Despentes' later books Pretty Things, King Kong Theory, and Vernon Subutex, saying that Pretty Things "wickedly refutes the stereotype of the chic French girl and exposes the sham at the heart of femininity. And it shows our complicity, male and female, individual and corporate, in keeping the sham of femininity alive."

Pretty Things was praised by multiple critics after Emma Ramadan's translation. King Kong Theory is sometimes taught in gender studies classes and "often passed down to millennial women as a recommendation from a cool, not-that-much-older mentor."

Anthony Cummins, reviewing Vernon Subutex 3, writes that "the novel’s real energy, somewhere between contrarian op-ed and off-colour standup, lies in how Despentes stays out of the picture to let the story unfold through the thoughts of its large, 20-plus cast [...] It can be exhausting, but it’s also invigorating, and there isn’t really anything else like it right now."

== Awards and distinctions ==
Despentes won the 1998 Prix de Flore and 1999 Prix littéraire Saint-Valentin for Les Jolies Choses as well as the 2010 Prix Renaudot for Apocalypse Bébé.

She was named a member of the Académie Goncourt on 5 January 2016. Despentes resigned from this position on 6 January 2020 in order to dedicate more time to writing.

In 2018, Despentes was shortlisted for the International Booker Prize, for Vernon Subutex 1, translated into English by Frank Wynne.

== Publications ==
Publication year	French title	English title	English publication
1994	Baise-moi	Fuck Me	Transl. by Bruce Benderson; Grove Press, 2002
1994	Mordre au travers: nouvelles		
1996	Les Chiennes savantes		
1998	Les Jolies Choses	Pretty Things	Transl. by Emma Ramadan; The Feminist Press at CUNY, 2018
2002	Teen Spirit		
2002	Trois étoiles		
2004	Bye Bye Blondie	Bye Bye Blondie	Transl. by Siân Reynolds; The Feminist Press at CUNY, 2016
2006	King Kong Théorie	King Kong Theory	Transl. by Stéphanie Benson; Serpent's Tail, 2009; Transl. by Siân Reynolds; The Feminist Press at CUNY, 2010; Transl. by Frank Wynne; Fitzcarraldo Editions, 2020
2010	Apocalypse Bébé	Apocalypse Baby	Transl. by Siân Reynolds; Serpent's Tail, 2013
2015	Vernon Subutex, 1	Vernon Subutex, 1	Transl. by Frank Wynne; MacLehose Press, 2017
2015	Vernon Subutex, 2	Vernon Subutex, 2	Transl. by Frank Wynne; MacLehose Press, 2018
2017	Vernon Subutex, 3	Vernon Subutex, 3	Transl. by Frank Wynne; MacLehose Press, 2021
2022	Cher connard	Dear Dickhead	Transl. by Frank Wynne; MacLehose Press, 2024

=== Stories ===
- 1997 : "C'est dehors, c'est la nuit", Recueil collectif 10, Grasset / Les Inrockuptibles.
- 2004 : "Toujours aussi pute", Revue Bordel no. 2, Flammarion.
- 2004 : "Putain, je déteste le foot...", Rock & Folk no. 444.
- 2009 : "I put a spell on you", Psychologies magazine.

== See also ==
- List of female film and television directors
- List of lesbian filmmakers
- List of LGBTQ-related films directed by women
