= Serpent's Tail =

British independent publishing firm

- Parent company: Profile Books
- Founded: 1986; 40 years ago
- Founder: Pete Ayrton
- Country of origin: United Kingdom
- Headquarters location: London
- Distribution: The Book Service (UK); Consortium Book Sales & Distribution (USA)
- Publication types: Books
- Official website: serpentstail.com

Serpent's Tail is a London-based independent publishing firm founded in 1986 by Pete Ayrton. It specialises in publishing work in translation, particularly European crime fiction. In January 2007, it was bought by British publisher Profile Books.

== Publications ==
The firm publishes both fiction and non-fiction books. Boyd Tonkin, writing for The Independent, has described the publisher's list as: "from hard-boiled noir to gems in translation and left-field cultural reportage – often defines the meaning of 'cool'."

=== Noted writers ===
- Derek Raymond
- Elfriede Jelinek
- Elizabeth Young
- Herta Müller
- Christian Kracht
- Jonathan Trigell
- Kathy Acker
- Kenzaburō Ōe
- Lionel Shriver
- Nicholas Royle
- Stella Duffy
- Neil Bartlett
- M. John Harrison

=== Noted debut novels ===
- Nineteen Seventy-Four by David Peace
- The South by Colm Tóibín
- Whatever by Michel Houellebecq
- Ready to Catch Him Should He Fall by Neil Bartlett

=== Book series ===
- 90s
- Crime Diaries (Danny King) (implied series)
- Extraordinary Tales
- Factory (implied series)
- Five Star Paperback
- Mask Noir
- Midnight Classics
- Nick Stefanos Mystery
- Serpent's Tail Classics

== High Risk Books ==
High Risk Books was an imprint of Serpent's Tail that existed between 1993 and 1997. It was founded by Ira Silverberg and Amy Scholder and aimed to publish innovative, provocative, and progressive literature (such as Kathy Acker and William S. Burroughs), poetry (including Jayne Cortez), and non-fiction (including the collected journalism of Cookie Mueller).
