= Media portrayal of HIV/AIDS =

Initial events and trends in the discussion of HIV and AIDS in mass media contributed to the stigma and discrimination against those affected with the disease. Later discussion, sometimes led by HIV+ individuals themselves, moved toward advocacy and education on disease prevention and management. The UNESCO report on Journalism Education says, "Well researched television content can create public awareness about HIV prevention, treatment, care and support can potentially influence the development and implementation of relevant policies."

The condition which was later to be called AIDS was first noticed in June 1981 when the Centers for Disease Control reported that five gay men in Los Angeles all died from a similar rare set of disease symptoms. Within two months 100 more gay men had died, and there was public awareness from medical publication that some new disease existed. Most media outlets have shown the tendency to universalize by emphasizing the risk to an entire age group, sex or sexual orientation as opposed to the behaviors and characteristics of individuals which pose the greater risk. How and when various media outlets throughout the world published this information varies, as has subsequent and contemporary reporting and depiction of HIV and AIDS in the media.

Many artists and AIDS activists such as Larry Kramer, Diamanda Galás and Rosa von Praunheim campaign for AIDS education and the rights of those affected. These artists worked with various media formats.

== Media figures known for presenting HIV/AIDS issues ==
Worldwide and historically, public figures have often led trends in reporting HIV/AIDS issues.

=== Rock Hudson ===
Rock Hudson was a high-profile Hollywood actor who died of AIDS-related complications on October 2, 1985.

Earlier that year the AIDS Project Los Angeles began arranging a benefit called the Commitment to Life dinner which had the goal of raising $1 million to fund a cure for AIDS. Originally the event had been scheduled in the small Century Plaza Hotel ballroom, but in July 1985 Hudson announced that he had AIDS and endorsed the event, greatly increasing the notoriety of the event and necessitating a change in venue to the Westin Bonaventure Hotel. On September 19, 1985, many top Hollywood personalities including Elizabeth Taylor, Shirley MacLaine and Los Angeles Mayor Tom Bradley attended the event, with performances by Carol Burnett, Sammy Davis Jr., Rod Stewart, Cyndi Lauper, Diahann Carroll and others.

=== Magic Johnson ===
American basketball player Magic Johnson's announcement that he had HIV resulted in a surge of Americans getting tested for HIV. A national conversation began when millions of people who had previously considered AIDS to be outside of their concern suddenly regarded the disease as a threat because a healthy male and public idol had contracted the infection.

=== Pedro Zamora ===
Pedro Zamora was a Cuban American gay male who contracted HIV as a teenager, became an HIV activist, was a feature of MTV's television show The Real World, then died of AIDS at age 22 in 1994. He is notable as being a major public figure who contracted HIV and whose everyday life was well-documented in mass media. In 1993 he testified to the United States Congress on his experience, and stated that "If you want to reach me as a young gay man—especially a young gay man of color—then you need to give me information in a language and vocabulary I can understand and relate to." He is credited as being a particularly effective spokesperson for raising awareness about HIV in the Latino community.

=== Princess Diana ===
Diana Frances Spencer, Princess of Wales, who died on August 31, 1997, was a supporter of raising awareness on AIDS, and breaking the belief that AIDS can be shared by touch.

Princess Diana opened up the United Kingdom's first AIDS ward, which is located at the London Middlesex Hospital, during the spring of 1987.

In 1991, a photograph was printed which showed Princess Diana shaking hands with an AIDS patient in the Casey House—a resident hall for patients with AIDS. In the photograph, it's seen that Diana was not wearing gloves while she was shaking hands with the AIDS patient.

== Themes in media depictions ==
Some identified themes which repeatedly appear in media depicting HIV are the concept of "other", victim blaming, heterosexism, and comparisons of the lifestyles of people in urban areas versus rural areas.

=== Other ===
In media with a theme of the "other" there is some depiction of a dichotomy. The divide in stories depicting AIDS is often HIV-positive people versus people without HIV, persons at high risk for contracting HIV versus people with low risk, innocent victims of HIV versus people shown to have guilt, and the general concept of contamination in blood versus pure blood. In all of these cases, movies dealing with AIDS-related subject matter frequently portray one side of the dichotomy as good and the other as evil.

=== Victim blaming ===
Movies with a theme of "victim blaming" often portray people living with AIDS as being guilty or culpable for contracting HIV. In such themes, persons with HIV often threaten the health of innocent people.

=== Heterosexism ===
The United States news media associated AIDS with gay men beginning in 1982 despite the CDC at that time having regularly revealed that other populations also were contracting the infection causing AIDS. By 1983 nearly all media about gay men was in the context of delivering AIDS stories. Movies which feature HIV as a theme frequently depict a gay male as the central character with AIDS. Media depiction of AIDS as a gay male disease is problematic because it fails to promote public understanding of the impact of AIDS on the diverse populations which AIDS affects.

=== Urban versus rural ===
Representations of AIDS in media may make a comparison between urban and rural areas. In such portrayals, the city may be portrayed as a place for gay community and the spread of AIDS while the rural areas represent morality, conservationism, and freedom from harmful deviancy.

== Role of new media ==
Previously, limited information stemmed from a handful of authoritative sources. For HIV/AIDS, the new media brings about opportunities as well as challenges. "There is potential for these changes to bring greater pluralism, access to information, democratization and responsiveness to consumers' needs." However, "these changes also bring a highly advertising-driven and commercial media, prone to sensationalism and often highly sexualized."

== Notable depiction ==
=== Films ===
- Buddies (1985) – first independent film to depict the AIDS epidemic
- An Early Frost (1985) – first network film to depict the AIDS epidemic
- Longtime Companion(1989) - which deals with the AIDS crisis from the first NY Times article to the end of the decade, through the eyes of a group of friends slowly shrinking due to the disease. The title comes from the way newspapers then depicted survvivors of Gay peoples' deaths.
- Silence = Death and Positive – two award-winning documentaries by Rosa von Praunheim, both were released in 1990
- Philadelphia (1993) – award-winning film that tells the story of gay man Andrew Beckett who asks lawyer Joe Miller to help him sue his employers, who fired him after discovering he has AIDS. It is notable for being one of the first mainstream Hollywood films to explicitly address HIV/AIDS and homophobia.
- To Touch the Soul (2007) – a documentary film about Californian students who use visual arts to help Cambodian children affected by HIV/AIDS express their wishes and desires.
- Dallas Buyers Club (2013) – a film based on the real life story of Ron Woodroof, a Dallas man who contracted HIV and then founded the title club to sell Non-FDA approved anti-viral drugs. It was nominated for 6 Academy Awards, with Matthew McConaughey and Jared Leto winning Academy Awards for Best Actor and Best Supporting Actor.
- The Normal Heart (2014) – depicts the HIV-AIDS crisis in New York City between 1981 and 1984, as seen through the eyes of writer/activist Ned Weeks, the founder of a prominent HIV advocacy group, the Gay Men's Health Crisis.

=== TV ===
- Angels in America (2003) award-winning HBO miniseries based on Tony Kushner's play of the same name, that depicts New York during the AIDS epidemic in 1985
- Canadian teen drama Degrassi High notably depicts school bully Dwayne Myers testing positive for HIV. He mends his antagonistic relationship with Joey Jeremiah when the latter agrees to keep his secret, but eventually makes it public, causing his friends and most of the students at Degrassi to stay away with him, including at the school dance. His female friend however has a change of heart after being explained how AIDS is transmitted. After Jeremiah finds him standing in the bathroom at the dance, he encourages Dwayne to get out there, where his female friend asks him to dance.
- It's a Sin (2021) - a group of friends find opportunity, acceptance and love in '80s London. Then the HIV/AIDS epidemic sweeps the country and devastates their circle.

=== Performing Arts ===
- Angels in America (1991), Pulitzer Prize-awarded play by Tony Kushner
- RENT (1996), Pulitzer Prize-awarded musical by Jonathan Larson

=== Cartoons ===
Andy Lippincott's death from AIDS in the comic strip Doonesbury on May 24, 1990, ran on the obituary page of The San Francisco Chronicle, and Andy also received a square in the NAMES Project AIDS Memorial Quilt.

=== Poetry ===
"A Quilt For David" (2021) by Steven Reigns reassesses the story of David J. Acer, the Florida dentist accused of deliberately infecting six of his patients with HIV in 1990. Reigns challenges the media depiction at the time of Acer as a "modern Dracula".

== By region ==
=== Africa ===
==== Kenya ====
In 1990 the director of the Kenya Medical Research Institute announced that with a drug called Kemron he had cured many AIDS patients of HIV. Kenyan president Daniel arap Moi supported this claim whereupon the research received international scrutiny and was determined by all experts to be without merit.

==== South Africa ====
South Africa boasts a highly developed mass media communications infrastructure. There are five open broadcast commercial television stations, 38 commercial radio stations, 70 community radio stations, 16 daily commercial news papers, one bi-weekly newspaper, 25 weekly newspapers, and several smaller circulation titles. Even so, "Years of state denial in South Africa resulted in poor national understanding of HIV and the urgent need to increase public engagement with health research, and encourage behaviour that reduces transmission and supports the uptake of relevant health interventions." The areas that are the least represented in the media include prevention, care, and stigma reduction.

More recently, several projects have been initiated in South Africa to increase HIV/AIDS awareness including the Commuter Aids Information Project (2007–2011) and an initiative from 1996 to 1997 by the National DoH, which used the taxi industry in an awareness and condom distribution campaign. The Africa Centre for Health and Population Studies began another similar project that was launched in February 2011. The project highlights the important role the media plays on health education using the term edutainment. In this project, entitled Jiving with Science, three different types of CDs were passed out to mini-bus taxi drivers and other community stakeholders, including shop operators and hairdressers, over the course of two years. These CDs contained narratives on the science behind HIV/AIDS mixed in with popular music and celebrity endorsements. The community stakeholders were told to play the CDs, which resulted in widespread outreach in the South African community. The researchers chose to use an audio form of media because of the rural nature of their research area, meaning a strong oral culture and relatively low literacy levels. An important aspect of edutainment is quality, which was very important for the researchers. The Africa Centre for Health and Population Studies has spent a significant amount of time and money to ensure that they were providing high-quality entertainment. The project is still ongoing, but the goal is that it can be used in the future as, "a model to develop other small-media edutainment interventions at Africa Centre, and in other comparative settings."

==== Sub-Saharan Africa ====
Out of the entire global population, two thirds of those affected with HIV/AIDS live in sub-Saharan Africa, a region with only about 12% of the world's population. Jung et al. (2013) conducted a cross-sectional study on 13 sub-Saharan countries, with the purpose of analyzing data from each country's Demographic Health Surveys between 2004 and 2010 to determine the correlation, if any, between HIV/AIDS knowledge, condom usage, and varying socioeconomic statuses (SES). Historically, sub-Saharan Africa has been behind on mass media usage until the beginning of the 21st century. Now, they make use of radio, television, and newspapers. In fact, 5.2% of all households have televisions and 36.9% of the population subscribes to mobile services. The study's hypothesis was that, "communication inequalities, differential media use among social classes, may be one plausible mechanism through which social inequalities in wealth and education lead to knowledge disparities of HIV/AIDS in sub-Saharan Africa." The study gathered information from a total of 220,099 sub-Saharan Africans and the results were as follows: over 90% knew what HIV/AIDS is, 61% knew how the disease is transmitted, and ~64% knew about prevention methods. A total of 22% of men and 10% of women reported using condoms, a significantly lower figure than those that reported knowledge of prevention methods. Media usage figures from the study were as follows: 36.7% of people listen to the radio, 17.6% watch television, and 6.4% read newspapers daily. A positive correlation between SES and media use was also found, which supports the original hypothesis. Those Africans that came from wealthier socioeconomic statuses generally had more knowledge of all aspects of HIV/AIDS including definition, transmission, and prevention. Similarly, there was found to be higher condom usage among the wealthier.

==== Media effect on donor assistance ====
A study conducted by Fabrizio Carmignani, Grace Lordan, and Kam Ki Tang specifically studied the correlation between media usage and aid for HIV/AIDS in Africa. The study was conducted using a panel of 21 donor countries and the aid the entire continent of Africa. They used the entire continent for two reasons: most of the HIV media coverage refers to the whole continent and there are many continent-wide organizations that give aid including USAID HIV/AIDS Regional Health Profile for Southern Africa. In short, they found that media coverage increases aid disbursement. They describe on page 29 that, "The dollar effect of one additional article in the press... is approximately equal to US $800." This means that for every article printed about HIV/AIDS, $800 of aid is given to afflicted African countries.

=== Brazil ===
In Brazil a campaign was developed to counteract local Catholic leaders' assertion that condoms are permeable to HIV. The ad poster depicted a condom inflated with water and containing a goldfish and displaying a message which translates as, "nothing gets through a condom."

Singer Kelly Key was a spokesperson to highschool age young adults in a campaign in which she said, "Show how you've grown up. This Carnaval, use condoms."

President Luiz Inácio Lula da Silva began an international discussion about fairness of pricing of HIV drugs when he signed a license allowing Brazil's purchase of generic efavirenz against the wishes of the patent holder. The move marked an escalation in disagreement over drug pricing and was portrayed in the media as a victory for victims of HIV and expropriation of intellectual property by the pharmaceutical industry.

The popular comedy group Porta dos Fundos debuted the comedy web series Viral, centered around a man with HIV, who decides to seek the latest eight women with whom he had sexual intercourse to give the news and try to find out who is the possible transmitter.

=== Burma ===
In Burma, the generals managing the government were slow to recognize HIV in the country. AIDS counseling and treatment is almost nonexistent. Condoms were banned in Burma until 1993.

=== Germany ===
In Germany, among others, the famous gay rights activist Rosa von Praunheim is particularly committed to AIDS education, safer sex and the rights of those affected. His artistic work had an international impact. In 1987, the Gesellschaft für deutsche Sprache chose the term "AIDS" as German Word of the Year, together with "condom". AIDS had already been considered for this title in 1985.

Twenty-eight-year-old singer Nadja Benaissa of the hit band No Angels was convicted in 2010 of causing grievous bodily harm and attempting bodily harm by being HIV positive and having sex without disclosing her status. Benaissa was accused of having had sex a total of five times with three men when she was between the ages of 16 and 20 between 2000 and 2004. She admitted not informing them of her HIV status. One man later became infected with HIV. In court testimony court, one of the men said "We had sex between five and seven times, about three of those were unprotected." The case prompted an international discussion about HIV.

=== India ===
Dr. Rahul Swami at the ICFAI Business School in Jaipur, India conducted a comparative study to analyze the relationship between how people who listened to the radio perceived HIV/AIDS versus how people who watched TV perceived HIV/AIDS. The study consisted of asking 80 people (40 males, 40 females) about their perceptions of various TV Channels and Radio stations using a 5-point Likert type scale. The results of the study showed that the TV Channels are dominant in getting out information about HIV/AIDS and more widely expected to create HIV/AIDS awareness.

=== Italy ===
As the geographical base of the Catholic Church, Italy has been influential worldwide in discussion of HIV/AIDS. The relationship between the Catholic Church and AIDS has an effect on all places with a Catholic demographic.

=== Japan ===
In 1988 Noriyasu Akase appeared in an interview televised by NHK becoming the first person in Japan to publicly announce being HIV positive.

By 1994 only a total of four people nationwide had admitted publicly that they were infected.

=== Philippines ===
Dolzura Cortez was the first Philippine person to publicly announce that she had HIV; Sarah Jane Salazar was the second.

In 1994 the Philippines government began its first major program to combat the spread of HIV. Manila Archbishop Cardinal Jaime Sin spent much of that year denouncing the program in general and targeted Department of Health Secretary Juan Flavier by naming him an "agent of Satan" to hundreds of thousands of people for his condom promotion program. The church system also organized public burnings of boxes of condoms.

More recently, the Philippines has attracted greater media attention because of the steep rise in new HIV infections. Based on the UNAIDS Global report on the HIV/AIDS epidemic, the HIV incidence rate in the Philippines increased by more than 25% from 2001 to 2011. It is estimated that one Filipino gets infected with HIV every 1.5 hours.

An HIV surveillance study conducted in 2010 by Dr. Louie Mar Gangcuangco and colleagues from the University of the Philippines-Philippine General Hospital particularly attracted media attention because of the high HIV prevalence rate reported. The study found that out of 406 men having sex with men tested for HIV in Metro Manila, HIV prevalence was 11.8% (95% confidence interval: 8.7–15.0), several times higher than the national prevalence for HIV.

=== Thailand ===
In the late 1980s Thai senator Mechai Viravaidya inaugurated a highly visible condom distribution campaign. At the same time the Prime Minister Anand Panyarachun supported public health with a sex education program which included requiring radio stations to run AIDS-education ads hourly.

=== United States ===
The Kaiser Family Foundation with Princeton Survey Research Associates conducted a comprehensive examination of HIV/AIDS coverage in the United States between 1981 and 2002. The goal of the study was to answer a wide variety of questions including: "Has the amount of coverage of the epidemic increased or decreased over time? How have the topics covered changed? How has coverage of AIDS in the U.S. fared?". Overall, it was found that a sort of media "fatigue" has occurred; meaning that coverage of HIV/AIDS in recent years has declined. There has been a decline in the number of stories as well as a "decreased reporting on the domestic epidemic." Brodie et al. suggests that this decline is due to the fact that the attitude towards HIV/AIDS in America has changed. An HIV/AIDS diagnosis was once considered a death sentence, but gradually the condition has become comparable to any other chronic disease. Another study, that also acknowledges this decline, analyzes specifically how newspaper coverage has changed in the U.S. from 1993 to 2007. The study shows that there was a significant decline in coverage of HIV/AIDS in mainstream press as news stories per month fell from 578.3 in 1993 to 140.5 in 2007. This is a 76% decrease. Newspaper coverage was at its highest after the Centers for Disease Control and Prevention announced in 1993 that AIDS had become the "leading cause of death among men aged 24-44." The next year, 1994, a similar announcement was made declaring AIDS the "leading cause of death among women of the same age group." This changed the social stigma that HIV/AIDS was a disease that only affected gay men and made it "everyone's problem", and as a result, HIV/AIDS stories were often featured as human-interest pieces. This trend did not last long, because in 1996 the disease was moved from a fatal to a chronic disease, marking the first decline in US HIV newspaper coverage.

==== In government ====
In 1983 the United States Public Health Service defined AIDS as its "number one priority" and US secretary of Health Margaret Heckler said that it was her "top priority". In contrast, US President Ronald Reagan was elected to office in 1980 and held it until 1989, and in that time, he only gave a single speech mentioning the word "AIDS" and this was in 1987. Reagan's silence was interpreted by many as a profound lack of personal concern for victims of the worst infectious disease to emerge since the 1918 flu pandemic. In 1989 Reagan's personal physician gave an interview in which he stated that "Mr. Reagan did not realize how serious the epidemic was until July 1985, when he saw a news report that Mr. Hudson, who later died of the disease, was seeking treatment for AIDS."

== Reports on cures ==
A baby born in Mississippi in 2013 was reported to have been cured of HIV, in that a cocktail of drugs resulted in remission without the need for further treatment, the HIV having ceased to replicate. However, later testing when the HIV drugs had been stopped revealed that the child was still HIV positive.

== Sources ==
- Hart, Kylo-Patrick R. (2000). The AIDS movie : representing a pandemic in film and television. New York [u.a.]: Haworth. ISBN 978-07890-1107-7.
