= Davy Kiprotich Koech =

Kenyan scientist (1951–2024)

Professor Davy Kiprotich Koech
- Born: 21 August 1951; Motero, Soliat, Kericho County, Colony and Protectorate of Kenya
- Died: 5 September 2024 (aged 73)
- Education: Kericho High School, Strathmore College, University of Nairobi
- Occupation: Immunologist
- Organization: KEMRI
- Website: www.davykoech.com

Prof. Davy Kiprotich Koech (21 August 1951 – 5 September 2024) was a Kenyan scientist. He was the Chief Executive Officer Centre for Clinical & Molecular Sciences; Professor of Immunology & Molecular Medicine; Distinguished Professor, The Australian-Asian Institute of Civil Leadership.

== Early life and education ==
Koech was born on 21 August 1951 in a small village, Motero, Soliat Sub-Location of the Kericho County. His parents were Samuel Kipkoech (a.k.a. Kipruto) Mitei and Helen Mitei. He attended his early years of education at Soliat Primary School, four kilometers from his home between 1956 and 1959 (Class 1–4) after which he proceeded to Sitotwet Intermediate School (now Torit School) (1960–1963) where he sat the Kenya African Preliminary Examination (KAPE) and then to Cheribo Primary School (1964) where he sat the Kenya Preliminary Education (KPE) exams.

His secondary education was undertaken at the Kericho High School where he sat the Ordinary Level of the University of Cambridge Local Examinations Syndicate. G.C.E. (Nov. 1968) and proceeded to Strathmore College where he sat for his University of London, General Certificate of Education, Advanced Level (Jan 1970) and further to the University of Nairobi completing in April 1974.

== University education and related education ==
Koech attended the University of Nairobi where he undertook a Bachelor of Science in Chemistry and Zoology completing in April 1974. He later went ahead to acquire a Master of Science in Pharmacology specializing in Clinical Pharmacology at Duquesne University, Pittsburgh, Pennsylvania, USA in 1977.

Koech had a PhD in Medical Pathology, Immunology from the University of Nairobi, Kenya; research undertaken at Harvard University Medical School, Boston, MA, USA in 1980.

He had served in various positions in the Government of Kenya and other different organizations in the private sector and international bodies.

== Death ==
Koech died on 5 September 2024, at the age of 73.

== Publications ==
1. 2019 Elliot D and Koech DK. Reimaging Science and Statecraft in Postcolonial Kenya. Routledge Taylor & Francis Group. UK. 2019; London, UK
2. 1999 Koech DK (Chairman). Totally Integrated Quality Education and Training [TIQET]. Report of the Commission of Inquiry into the Education System of Kenya. 1999; Nairobi, Kenya
3. 1996 Mungai JM and KOECH DK (Eds.). Demystifying AIDS in Africa. African Forum for Health Sciences. 1996; Nairobi, Kenya.
4. 1996 Mungai JM, Kofi-Tsekpo MW and KOECH DK (Eds.). Saving Africa from Drawing in Social Drugs. African Forum for Health Sciences. 1996; Nairobi, Kenya.
5. 1986 Kinoti SN, KOECH DK and Tukei PM (Eds.). Advances in the Diagnosis, Treatment and Prevention of Immunizable Diseases in Africa with a Symposium on AIDS: Proceedings of the Seventh KEMRI/KETRI Annual Medical Scientific Conference. 1986; Nairobi, Kenya.
6. 1985 Tukei PM, KOECH DK and Kinoti SN (Eds.). Recent Advances in the Management and Control of Infections in Eastern Africa: Proceedings of the Sixth Annual Scientific Conference, Nairobi, Kenya. KEMRI and KETRI. 1985; Nairobi, Kenya

== Koech Commission ==
Koech was appointed by the former president of the Republic of Kenya Daniel Toroitich arap Moi to head the Davy Koech Commission that formed an inquiry into Kenya's Education System in 1999.

The Commission of Inquiry into the Education System of Kenya (The Koech Report, 2000) was mandated to recommend ways and means of enabling the education system to facilitate national unity, mutual social responsibility, accelerated industrial and technological development, life-long learning, and adaptation in response to changing circumstances. The Koech Report recommended Totally Integrated Quality Education and Training (TIQET). While the Government did not adopt the Report due to the cost implications some recommendations, such as curriculum rationalization have been adopted and implemented.

== Controversies ==
In the 1990s, Koech, by then the Director of Kenya Medical Research Institute and Arthur Obel, the Chief Research Officer published in two medical journals the initial results of the new found drug "Kemron" that was perceived from the preliminary study of 10 patients to cure AIDS. The drug was introduced in a public ceremony presided by Kenya's former President, Daniel arap Moi, and the work of the new wonder drug discovered was hailed as a major step against AIDS and a win for African Science by the former Vice President and Finance Minister George Saitoti.

Kemron was the trade name for a low-dose of alpha interferon, manufactured form of a natural body chemical in a tablet form that dissolves in the mouth.

Clinical trials of Kemron funded by the World Health Organization (WHO) in five African Countries did not find any health benefits reported by Kemri scientists. Thereafter, the WHO termed Kemron as an experimental drug of unproved benefit for HIV/AIDS treatment.

The American National Institute of Health concluded that no one had been able to duplicate the effects claimed by scientists behind Kemron.

Despite his achievements, Koech was linked to embezzlement of KSH 19.3 million which occurred during his tenure as the managing director at Kenya Medical Research Institute (KEMRI). In September 2021, Koech was found guilty of fraudulent acquisition of public property by Senior Principal Magistrate Victor Wakumile. The court fined Koech Ksh19.6 million which it added could be paid in two instalments failure to which he would serve a six-year jail term. Due to his outstanding contribution to science and research in Kenya and even globally, Koech was pardoned by the Kenyan President through the power of mercy in November 2022.
