= Akase =

Akase (written: 赤瀬) is a Japanese surname. Notable people with the surname include:

- Noriyasu Akase (赤瀬 範保), Japanese HIV/AIDS activist
- Sayaka Akase (赤瀬 紗也香, born 1994), Japanese swimmer
