= Noriyasu =

- Gender: Male

Origin
- Origin: Japanese
- Meaning: Different meanings depending on the kanji used

Noriyasu (written: 典靖, 憲保, 範康, 範保 or 則安) is a masculine Japanese given name. Notable people with the name include:

- Noriyasu Agematsu (上松 範康), Japanese composer
- Noriyasu Akase (赤瀬 範保), Japanese AIDS activist
- Noriyasu Hirata (平田 典靖; born 1983), Japanese badminton player
- Noriyasu Mizukami (水上 則安; born 1947), Japanese long-distance runner
- Noriyasu Numata (沼田 憲保; 1966–2007), Japanese motorcycle racer
