= Kemron =

Kemron is the name of a drug which was released in Kenya in 1991 and was alleged to be highly effective in removing the symptoms of AIDS. When put under international scrutiny, the treatment was seen to perform no better than placebo. The advent of the drug was notable for the government support and international attention it received.

== Claim ==
In August 1990, Kenyan researcher Davy Koech, director of the Kenya Medical Research Institute, announced that when his HIV patients chewed wafers laced with tiny amounts of alpha interferon, most had greatly improved health and some cleared HIV from their blood entirely. The alpha interferon, named "Kemron" for this use, was a drug used to treat cancer in much greater doses.

In 1993, Professor Arthur Obel, a Kenyan scientist, claimed that Kemron and another drug called Pearl Omega could cure HIV/AIDS. Kemron was later proved to be ineffective and Pearl Omega had very few positive outcomes. Obel tested on patients with these drugs and these patients filed a lawsuit on Obel for testing unproven drugs on them. The government later denounced both drugs and Obel's reputation has been discredited.

== Response ==
After reviewing the experimental data, internationally recognized AIDS experts and health officials in the United States said that there was no merit to the claim.

Kenyan president Daniel arap Moi announced that "Fifty AIDS victims have already been cured" and Koech dismissed the skepticism of Western scientists. Barbara Justice, a physician in New York, claimed that 82% of AIDS patients at the Abundant Life clinic saw increases in their appetites and "other improvements." Neither the World Health Organization nor the NIH found evidence that Kemron performed better than placebo.

== Withdrawal of claim ==
Support of the drug proved to be an accomplishment for many of its supporters as the drug cured patients under controlled conditions.

The University of Pretoria and the Government of South Africa ultimately were not able to support the claim of the drug's efficacy.
