= Barbara Justice =

American oncologist

Barbara J. Justice-Muhammad is an American forensic and clinical psychiatrist as well as a surgical oncologist, and the first African-American woman to be trained in general surgery at Columbia University Medical Center. She worked at Harlem Hospital, and Memorial Sloane Kettering sites in New York City. She is well known for her long-running New York radio show, Medical View and You, and was honored in 1996 when Mayor David Dinkins proclaimed a citywide Barbara Justice Day for her contribution to the community's health.

== Biography ==
Justice received a BA from the City College of New York. In 1971, she did Post BA / Pre-Medicine studies at Columbia University and Connecticut College. After attaining her MD from Howard University College of Medicine in Washington DC in 1977, she had an interest in pursuing both surgery and psychiatry, and intended to eventually practice both. While at Howard, she became pregnant with her son, Kamao Justice Douglas, but refused to quit school.

Justice states that she felt isolated until she received support from the Nation of Islam. People began to think that she had actually joined when she began researching the origin of the AIDS virus with medical members of the organization. However, Justice never joined the Nation of Islam in 1994.

== Career ==
Justice advocated vigorously for the National Institutes of Health (NIH) to focus on better treatments for the AIDS epidemic that was ravaging the black and gay communities, as she considered that the high dose used in Zidovudine (AZT) treatment was poisonous. She eventually became an investigative researcher for NIH after becoming involved with a search for better treatment. Many felt that origin and handling of AIDS required investigation in light of historical institutional mishandling of contagious diseased, such as in the Tuskegee Study, where black patients who had syphilis were left untreated to spread the virus for more than thirty years. Many in the black community and others felt that AIDS might be a plot to exterminate black people, and theorized that greater amounts of melanin in the black population made them more vulnerable to AIDS. In August 1990, Justice, along with Gary Byrd, visited Nairobi to learn more about experimental treatments for AIDS. Justice, along with her colleagues, worked with the National Institutes of Health in 1992 to set up trials for oral interferons such as Kemron to treat AIDS, and came to promote their use. According to a Nation of Islam doctor, 82% of the patients with AIDS who were treated with interferons at the Abundant Life clinic "experienced increased appetite and other improvement." Justice also arranged for AIDS patients in New York to go to Nairobi in order to receive Kemron treatments. Despite the NIH's criticism of Kemron, Justice continued promoting it, feeling that there was a reluctance to explore and include black research. She also believed that the white conservative medical profession needed to deal with the fact that statistically, more black people were infected with AIDS worldwide than other groups. She is referenced in the autobiography of Arthur Ashe when he described his battle with the deadly disease.

Justice treated many notable people for many different illnesses besides AIDS. She was Stokely Carmichael's personal physician. She treated him for a duodenal ulcer in 1988 and Carmichael called her a "kindred spirit." Later, she diagnosed him with cancer. As surgeon, Justice was the attending physician at Tupac Shakur's first shooting and oversaw his recovery.

== Honors and awards ==
- American Psychiatric Association, Minority Fellowship Cultural Research in Psychiatry, 2002

== Lectures and presentations ==
- Cultural Psychiatry, Community Effect Harlem Hospital Center, General Psychiatry Department, February 2003
- Dual Diagnosis Harlem Hospital Center Department Wide Conference, February 2003
- Recovery of the Impaired Professional Harlem Hospital Center, General Psychiatry Department, January 2005
- Dementia Pugilistica Review and Update Harlem Hospital Department of Geriatric Care, Harlem New York, May 2005
- Pseudocyesis and Violence/Homicide UCLA/Sepulveda Forensic Psychiatry Program University of California, June 2006
- Sex, Insanity, Competency and Dangerousness: Forensic Psychiatry Landmark Cases American Academy of Forensic Sciences, Washington, DC, February 2008
- Innovative Forensic Teaching Techniques American Academy of Psychiatry and the Law Seattle, Washington, October 2008
- The Involuntary Administration of Psychotropic Medication; Landmark Cases and Penal Codes Department of Forensic Psychiatry, Metropolitan State Hospital Norwalk, California, November 2008
- Electroconvulsive Therapy: Torture or Relief? Superior Court of the State of California for the County of Los Angeles Department 95, May 2009
