= The Gay Rub =

Participatory art project created by Steven Reigns

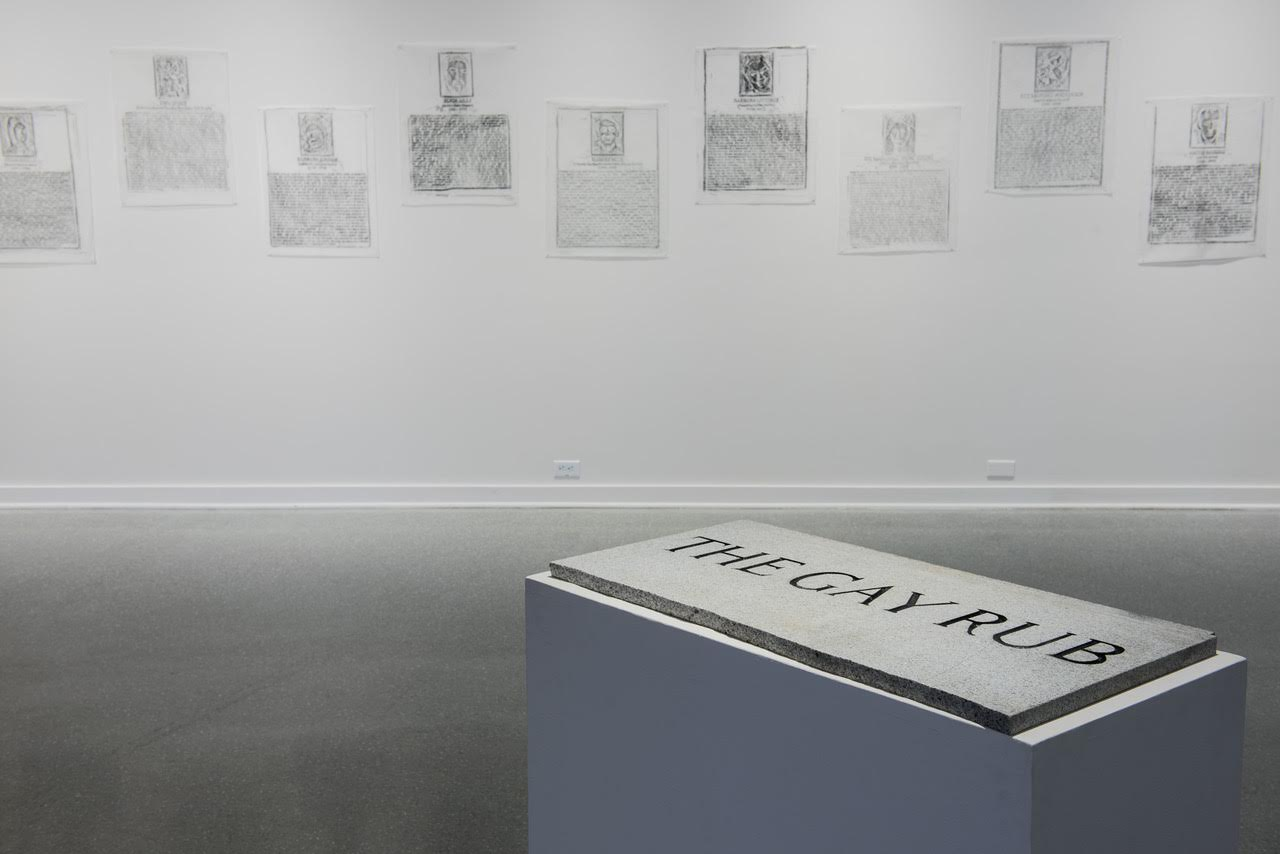
Rubbings from significant LGBTQ markers, part of The Gay Rub collection

The Gay Rub is a participatory art project originally created by American poet, artist, and activist Steven Reigns. The collection consists of over 350 “rubbings from GLBTQ historical markers, signs, tombstones, cenotaphs, plaques and monuments from around the world.” The collection includes markers representing Harvey Milk, Gertrude Stein, Oscar Wilde, Jean Genet, Marcel Proust, Liberace, James Dean, Tennessee Williams, Errol Flynn, and many more.

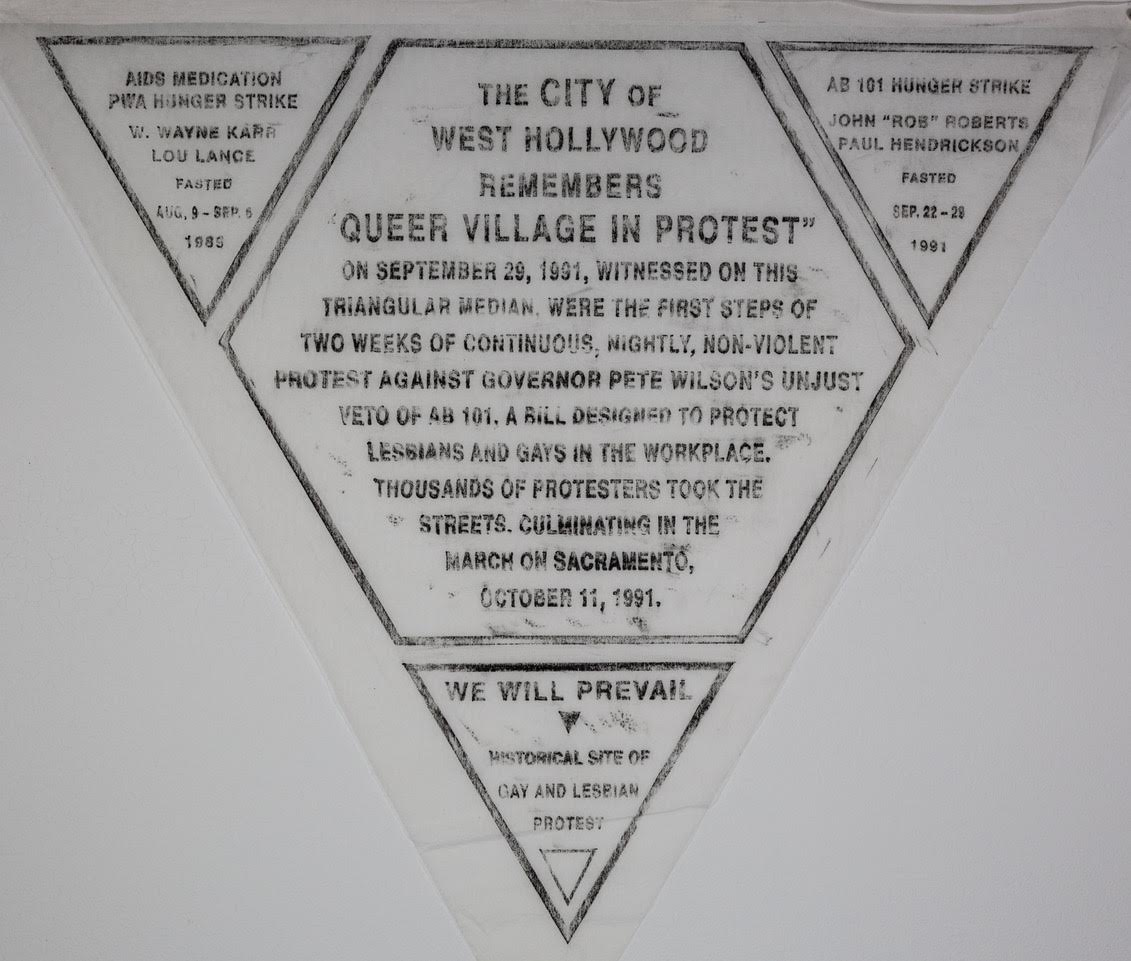
This rubbing of the marker in West Hollywood is part of the Gay Rub collection

The Gay Rub highlights significant “LGBTQ events and individuals who have been under-represented or under-appreciated throughout history.” Reigns said the idea came to him when he saw a marker dedicated to Transgender Victims of Hate Crimes in West Hollywood, California.

The goal of the project is to bring small, often remotely sited markers together in one place to demonstrate the breadth and diversity of LGBTQ history. The oldest rubbing is of painter and lithographer Théodore Géricault’s Paris headstone, dated 1824. The collection contains a rubbing of the Harvey Milk plaque once situated at Market and Castro in San Francisco – this marker was stolen in 2011, shortly after the rubbing was taken. As well as people, The Gay Rub also commemorates places associated with gay history, such as the OutRage! plaque commemorating the first gay rights demonstration in the United Kingdom and the Against Forgetting plaque in Berlin. It debuted at the ONE National Gay & Lesbian Archives in West Hollywood in 2014.

The rubbings are created in uniform style using black wax and white fabric and great care is taken to clean the markers before rubbing and to avoid any damage during the rubbing process. The collection is ongoing and continually expanding. While many of the rubbings have been collected from markers in the United States, the project is participatory and rubbings are accepted from contributors from all over the world.

The Gay Rub has toured as an exhibition to:

- Loyola Marymount University (2014)
- Appalachian State University (2015)
- the Cecille R, Hunt Gallery at Webster University, St. Louis (2015)
- University of South Florida (2018)

With Victor Salvo, Reigns organized a group of students from a local high school GSA group to help rub the 18 plaques that are part of Chicago's Legacy Walk.

The collection is the subject of The Gay Rub: A Documentary (2018) by Michael J. Saul. It was also featured in webseries The New 30s (Season 1, Episode 5) in 2017.
