= Arthur Obel =

Kenyan scientist (1948 or 1949 – 2025)

Chief Scientist Office of the Presdient
- In office 1995–1999
- President: Daniel arap Moi

Chief Research Officer Kenya Medical Research Institute
- In office 1989–1991

Personal details
- Born: 1948 Kenya
- Died: 27 September 2025 (aged 77) Nairobi
- Education: Friends School Kamusinga
- Alma mater: University of Nairobi; University of London

Arthur Obel (1948 or 1949 – 27 September 2025) was a Kenyan scientist, researcher and pharmacologist who served as Chief Scientist in the Office of the Presdient between 1995 to 1999 and previously Chief Research Officer of Kenya Medical Research Institute.His scientific work is credited with identification of the first cases of Human Immunodeficiency Virus in Kenya and claims of treatment of AIDS patients during the AIDS epidemic of the 1990's. He developed two medications, Kemron and Pearl Omega, to cure HIV/AIDS. It was later discovered that neither Kemron nor Pearl Omega were effective medications against the retrovirus.

== Early Life and Education ==
Obel received his PhD in Therapeutics from the London University in 1978. He then received his M.D. in Clinical Medicine from the University of Nairobi in 1987.

== Career ==
Obel was head of the Public Administration of the Kenya Institute of Administration in 1990. He also had the position of Chief Research Officer of the Kenya Medical Research Institute (KEMRI) from 1989 to 1991. Obel later became the Chief Scientist of the Office of the President of Kenya from 1995 to 1999. This high position in government allowed him to attain many funds for his research. Being in a respectable position also allowed him to have many close friends that were high ranking government officials, such as Philip Mbithi, the former Chief Secretary in the Office of the President of Kenya.

=== Medical Research Works ===
==== Kemron ====
Obel became widely known during the HIV/AIDS epidemic for promoting Kemron and later Pearl Omega as potential treatments for HIV/AIDS. He publicly stated that these medicines could provide significant therapeutic benefits, and at various times described them as effective treatments for the disease. However, subsequent scientific studies and evaluations by independent researchers did not establish that the medicines were effective in treating or curing HIV/AIDS, and they were not adopted as standard HIV/AIDS therapies. Obel joined the (KEMRI), where he participated in research aimed at identifying effective treatments for HIV/AIDS. During this period, research focused on Kemron, a low-dose oral alpha-interferon formulation derived from an existing interferon compound. Kemron was also evaluated by researchers in other institutions, including Makerere University. While some early studies reported temporary clinical improvements in certain patients, later independent evaluations found insufficient evidence that Kemron produced sustained therapeutic benefits or altered the course of HIV infection. Consequently, the treatment did not gain acceptance within the mainstream scientific and medical community as an effective HIV/AIDS therapy. The widespread publicity surrounding Kemron generated significant public interest, leading many patients to seek the treatment despite continuing scientific debate over its efficacy. As criticism of the research and the public claims surrounding Kemron increased, Obel's work became the subject of considerable scientific and public scrutiny. He resigned from KEMRI in January 1991 and subsequently continued his research independently, later promoting another HIV/AIDS treatment known as Pearl Omega.

==== Pearl Omega ====
Pearl Omega, a herb, was found to have very few positive outcomes when combatting HIV. Obel claimed that Pearl Omega was a protease inhibitor and sold the drug at a very expensive price. One bottle of Pearl Omega was KSh. 30,000/=, the equivalent of £350 stg. Human trials of this medication started in 1991 and Obel claimed that the medication restored the health of seven AIDS patients. However, there was no scientific data to back up his claims. People were much less inclined to purchase the second drug produced by Obel after Kemron. The Health Minister disowned the drug and many institutions banned the use of the drug after the discrediting of Obel. Pearl Omega was later found to be sold in the black market illegally as it is illegal for any medication to be sold before it is approved by the Health Minister in Kenya.

==== Aftermath of Kemron and Pearl Omega ====
Professor Arthur Obel's HIV/AIDS research became the subject of significant scientific, regulatory, and legal controversy following his promotion of the treatments Kemron and later Pearl Omega. Although the medicines attracted considerable public attention, their claimed efficacy was not accepted by the mainstream scientific and medical community because sufficient evidence from controlled clinical trials was lacking. In 1998, the Kenya AIDS Society filed proceedings against Obel seeking an Interlocutory injunction to restrain him from manufacturing, distributing, selling, or administering Pearl Omega pending determination of the suit. The Society alleged, among other things, that Pearl Omega was being marketed without the necessary statutory approvals and that claims regarding its effectiveness against HIV/AIDS were unsubstantiated. The High Court (Kenya) declined to grant the injunction, and the Court of Appeal of Kenya upheld that decision, finding only that the legal requirements for an interlocutory injunction had not been satisfied. The appellate court did not determine that Pearl Omega was effective, nor did it make findings that Obel had committed fraud or falsified scientific information. Despite the controversy surrounding Kemron and Pearl Omega, Obel continued his academic and medical research on HIV/AIDS. In 2011, he co-authored a study examining the correlation between World Health Organization clinical staging and CD4 cell count among adult HIV-positive patients at Kenyatta National Hospital. Obel also authored the 1995 book Curbing the HIV/AIDS Menace Effectively.

==== Work not relating to HIV/AIDS ====
Although Obel is most known for his work on Kemron and Pearl Omega, a big part of Dr. Obel's research consisted of practical therapeutics. He has numerous published works including practical therapeutics on antibiotic therapy, the use of insulin, the use of anti-diabetic agents, the treatment of gout, the treatment of peptic ulcers, anxiolytic drugs, and the therapy of diarrhoeal diseases. Obel also wrote, and self-published, numerous books such as "Power and Intrigue," a book relating to one's power, whether it be associative, personal, professional, or reward power, "Kenya's Industrialization Strategy," and "Resilient Manhood Dynamism: The Basis of a Rapid Take-off."

=== Honoraries ===
Obel received many honoraries. He was a member of the Global Epidemiology Society in 1983 and the Achievers Society in 1983. Obel did a fellowship with numerous institutions including the Jewish Chemists Federation in 1986, the International Diabetes Federation in 1986, and the Global Pharmaceutical Federation in 1987. He was also a Project Management Professional (PMP) with the Centre for Finance and Project Management in 2004.

== 2004 shooting incident ==
In July 2004, Obel was charged with attempted murder following a shooting incident involving a matatu driver in Nairobi. According to the prosecution, the incident occurred after a traffic dispute on Tom Mboya Street involving Obel and a matatu driven by Joseph (also reported as John) Kyalo Kioko. Prosecutors alleged that Obel drew a firearm and shot the driver, who sustained injuries but survived. Following the shooting, police arrested Obel and searched his residences in Lavington and Loresho. According to contemporary reports, officers recovered a pistol, a shotgun and 19 rounds of ammunition. During the trial, Obel denied intending to kill the driver. He testified that he had been rushing home after learning that laboratory equipment involved in an experiment had malfunctioned and that he repeatedly requested the matatu driver to move before the confrontation escalated. The trial court subsequently acquitted Obel of the attempted murder charge. Publicly available reports do not indicate that he was convicted of any offence arising from the incident.

== Death ==
Obel died on 27 September 2025, at the age of 76.
