= Steven Reigns =

American poet, artist and activist (born 1975)

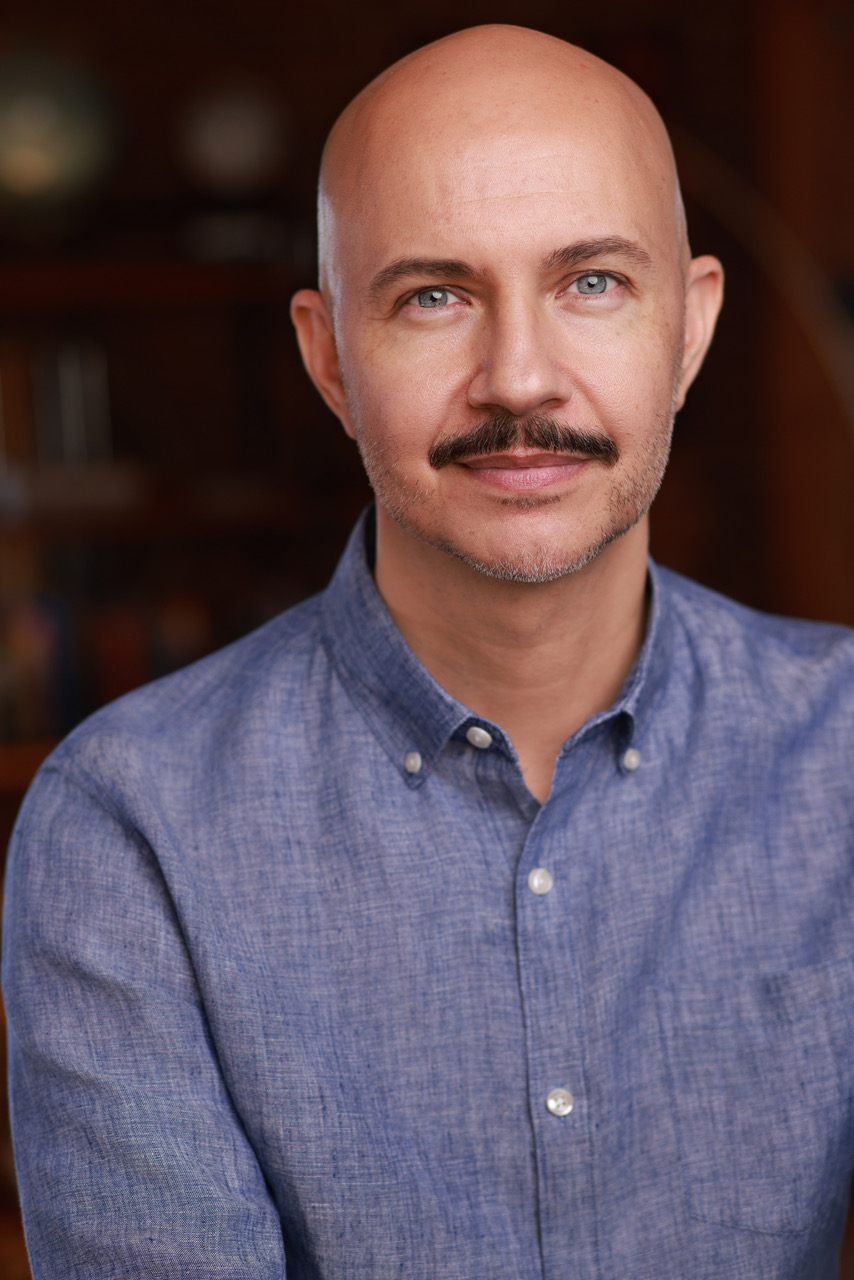
- Born: 11 November 1975 (age 50); St. Louis, Missouri, US
- Education: The University of South Florida; Antioch University
- Occupations: Poet, educator
- Writing career
- Period: 21st century
- Genre: poetry
- Notable works: A Quilt For David, Outliving Michael, Inheritance, The Gay Rub
- Notable awards: Los Angeles Department of Cultural Affairs Artist in Residency Grant for 2007, 2009, 2011-2015; City of Los Angeles Individual Artist Fellowship 2020; City Poet of West Hollywood 2014-2016; Poz Best in Literature Award 2025

Steven Reigns (born 1975) is an American poet, artist and activist known for his poetry publications, his work as West Hollywood's first City Poet, his participatory art projects, his LGBT activism, and his scholarly work on Anaïs Nin.

== Biography ==
=== Early years ===
Reigns grew up in the suburbs of St. Louis, Missouri. From an early age, he sought refuge from a troubled home life in local libraries where he discovered the writers who would have a huge impact on his own work: Sapphire, Essex Hemphill, Dorothy Allison, Edmund White, Anaïs Nin, Amy Scholder, John Preston and Audre Lorde.

=== Career ===
Reigns graduated from the University of South Florida, where he wrote a bi-monthly column for TLW magazine, with a degree in Creative Writing. He also has a Masters in Clinical Psychology from Antioch University.

Reigns is a fourteen-time recipient of the Los Angeles County Department of Cultural Affairs' Artist in Residency Grant. He was elected as West Hollywood's inaugural City Poet for a two-year term beginning in October 2014. He was selected as "Someone to Watch in 2015" by The Advocate Magazine. Reigns was selected for a City of Los Angeles Individual Artist Fellowship in 2020.

=== Library activism ===
Reigns has cited public libraries and librarians as a major influence on his development as an artist and activist. He has campaigned in support of gay, lesbian, bisexual and queer programming in libraries.

In 2004 he organized 'Loving in Fear', an LGBTQ literary event in response to Hillsborough County's lack of gay, lesbian, bisexual or queer programming. He recounted the experience in a Watermark Magazine article about National Library Week. He was the first to speak to the commissioners about their discriminatory policy at the library.

He was Literary Director for The Gay, Lesbian, Bisexual Center of Tampa for two years.

Reigns has been keynote speaker at Rollins College, Stonewall Library, and at the American Library Associations Annual Breakfast. He facilitates the monthly Lambda Literary Foundation Book Club.

=== HIV/AIDS activism ===
Reigns worked as a certified (in Florida and California) HIV test counselor for over 10 years, testing more than 9000 people. He contributed to a panel with Los Angeles County on standards of care for HIV. In 2011, he ran a support group that utilized film as a projective tool at Being Alive.

In 2012, he published an essay in Frontiers Magazine on the need for new AIDS narratives in cinema and literature. He published a poem about the so-called AIDS "Patient Zero" Gaëtan Dugas and in 2018 hosted an event at West Hollywood Council Chambers discussing Dugas’ legacy.

Reigns participated in a staged conversation about Keith Haring with Ann Magnuson at The Broad for World AIDS Day 2022.

In 2025, Reigns participated in the 25th Annual Paul Andrew Starke Warrior Awards, honoring outstanding employees and volunteers from West Hollywood agencies that provide HIV/AIDS and substance abuse prevention and care services.

== Artistic projects ==
=== The Gay Rub ===
Reigns created The Gay Rub, a participatory art project in 2011 and has curated the project ever since. The Gay Rub is a collection of rubbings taken from historically significant LGBTQ public markers, memorials, and monuments. Participants from around the world contribute rubbings of markers from their home city, along with commentary. There are currently more than 200 rubbings in the collection, which has toured major universities. The collection is the subject of The Gay Rub: A Documentary (2018) by Michael J. Saul.

=== Other art projects ===
Reigns has participated in several collaborative online projects, such as Heather Champs' Mirror Project and Anni Holm's Getting My Name Out There. He was also a character in Hilary Goldberg's In The Spotlight.

His artwork has been shown in galleries throughout the U.S.A including at The Advocate gallery part of Rainbow Gobblins exhibit in May 2007.

From 2007 to 2014, Reigns undertook a 7 years living/art project under the mentorship of Linda Montano, S(t)even Years.

=== Audio-visual media ===
Reigns and his work have been featured in a variety of other media, including:

- Cameo appearances as a "homo hommie" in Jonny McGovern's video Dickmatized and as a partier in Texting on the Dance Floor
- Co-host of IMRU Radio, the nations longest running LGBT radio show With some of his segments airing nationally on This Way Out
- Dean Littner directed a 64 min documentary on the My Life is Poetry Class
- His poem Domicilium was put to music and performed by One Voice Chorus in North Carolina
- Two poems by Reigns are used in Hunter Lee Hughes' black-and-white feature film Guys Reading Poems. Reigns is only one of two living poets whose work was used in the film. Recipe Box and Put Your Head on my Shoulder, both from his second collection Inheritance, are featured in the film
- Lines from Reigns’ poem Morning, West Hollywood were incorporated into vinyl art banners hung in the West Hollywood City Hall Community Plaza in 2016. Reigns collaborated with artist MONCHO1929 for this project
- Reigns was featured in Jenny Holzer’s SPEECH ITSELF (2022), a series of large-scale projections on the facades of 30 Rockefeller Plaza, 610 Fifth Avenue, and 620 Fifth Avenue. SPEECH ITSELF marked the centenary of PEN America.
- Reigns contributed a poem to 'Poetry Walk', a public art installation running from April 2023 to August 2024, presented by the City of West Hollywood
- Reigns was featured as a spoken word artist, alongside Justin Torres, winner of the 2023 National Book Award for Fiction, at The Broad's Smog Check event on 25 January 2024
- Reigns conceived an electronic billboard project, featuring West Hollywood's poet laureates, which ran at West Hollywood Gateway during April, 2024, to celebrate National Poetry Month

== Scholarly work ==
Reigns is an Anaïs Nin scholar and has presented at The Sapphire Symposium. He is President of the Board of the Anaïs Nin Foundation.

=== Anaïs Nin Scholarship ===
Reigns discovered Nin’s writing at the age of sixteen and her work has had a profound influence on his career. In February 2008, Reigns organized ‘Anaïs Nin@105’ at the Hammer Museum. Reigns said, "Nin bonded and formed very deep friendships with women and men decades younger than her. Some of them are still living in Los Angeles and I thought it'd be wonderful to have them share their experiences with (Nin)." Electronic musician Bebe Barron, who was championed by Nin early in her career, made her last public appearance at ‘Anaïs Nin@105’. Reigns spoke at Barron's memorial.

Reigns combed through Nin's original diaries to investigate the validity of Bern Porter's claims of his sexual relationship in the 1930s with Anaïs Nin, which were published as a series of interviews in the 1990s. Reigns' essay refuting Porter's claims, Bern Porter's Wild Sexual Life with Anais Nin or Wild Imaginings? was published in Café in Space and Thinking of Anaïs Nin.

Reigns' poem 'Anaïs Nin Never Bought a Car' was published in Divining Divas: 100 Gay Poets on Their Muses (2012).

Reigns facilitated the 2010 re-release of a long out-of-circulation audio book by Nin. Reigns loaned his rare 1949 pink vinyl version of Nin reading her prose poem House of Incest, recorded by Louis and Bebe Barron, to their son Adam Barron. Adam Barron used it as the basis for a CD release.

Reigns owns a large collection of Nin memorabilia and ephemera, including a copy of Marcel Proust's Albertine disparue, once owned by Nin. In the book are lines underlined by Henry Miller with notes written in the margin by both Nin and Miller.

Reigns organized and curated Anais Nin's Influence: Women who Knew Nin Talk About her Writing, Her Life and Their Friendship with Her at the West Hollywood Library in 2015. Reigns said of Nin and the event: "The struggles of life, love, and artistry Nin documented in detail daily. Her life and writings are more relevant now than ever. Hearing firsthand from women who knew Nin is an exceptional experience."

In January 2016, Reigns co-produced an event at Antioch University Santa Barbara, The Allure of Anaïs Nin.

In 2025, Reigns discovered and rescued an archive of Nin's papers and possessions. The items were stored in cardboard boxes in a metal container on a hillside vulnerable to fires and earthquakes. Shortly after he moved the materials to safe storage, the area was indeed ravaged by fire.

== Teaching ==
Reigns has taught writing workshops throughout his career. He began by teaching to LGBT youth groups across the United States, followed by workshops for HIV+ people. He has taught poetry to LGBT Seniors at Los Angeles LGBT Center for many years. This workshop My Life is Poetry was the first of its kind in the country and resulted in a book of the students' writings edited by Reigns. As part of his tenure as West Hollywood City Poet, he taught free writing workshops for National Poetry Month in West Hollywood, CA. Filmmaker Dean Littner made a documentary about the 2013 My Life Is Poetry reading by Reigns' students.

== Publications ==
=== Outliving Michael ===
Outliving Michael (Moontide Press, 2025) ISBN 1957799374

Outliving Michael is a poetry collection exploring the author's friendship with Michael Church, who died of AIDS in 2000. The work examines their intergenerational relationship, mentorship in gay life, and artistic development through the 1990s. Blending memoir and poetry, it addresses themes of grief, friendship, and the long-term impact of personal connections within the context of the AIDS crisis that claimed a generation of gay men.

Outliving Michael received the 'Best in Literature' 2025 Poz Award.

=== A Quilt For David ===
A Quilt for David (City Lights Books, 2021) ISBN 9780872868816

A Quilt For David explores the life of Florida dentist David J. Acer, who in 1990 was accused of infecting a patient (Kimberly Bergalis) with HIV. Reigns describes the work as “investigative poetry” as it is based on extensive research, conducted between 2012 and 2020, into Acer’s life and death, including interviews with those who knew him, as it played out against the AIDS hysteria of the late 1980s and early 1990s. In his poetry, Reigns challenges the media narrative of the time, which was that Acer infected his patients deliberately.

=== Other poetry publications ===
Reigns has published two other books of poetry.

- Your Dead Body is My Welcome Mat (2001) ISBN 0-9714393-1-1
- Inheritance (2011) ISBN 978-0-9832931-2-5

Inheritance was selected by Lambda Literary Foundation's My Story Book Club.

Reigns has also published chapbooks:

- Ignited (2006) ISBN 978-0-9714393-3-7
- Cartography (2007)
- Stu (2014)

His poetry is included in Velvet Mafia, a poetry chapbook on gay and lesbian response to war, Outside the Green Zone. Reigns was featured as Mr. November in the Most Intriguing and Sensual Male Poet Calendar(2006).

In June 2008, Reigns edited the anthology My Life is Poetry, a book of autobiographical poetry by gay, lesbian, and bisexual seniors created by those attending his workshops of the same name. The poems are accompanied by photographic portraits by Jenny Walters. The preface was written by Dorothy Allison.

In July 2015, Reigns edited 3-Pack Jack, a three book set based on his 2013 curation of the Apt3F performance series at Akbar, Los Angeles.

=== Other work ===
- Reigns wrote an article in defense of transgender writer and activist Kate Bornstein
- Reigns' short storyOn These Sheets is included in the Foolish Hearts anthology a Rainbow Book Finalist

Reigns' papers are held by the ONE National Gay and Lesbian Archives at USC Libraries.

== See also ==
- Official Steven Reigns Web-site
