= Filemona F. Indire =

Kenyan politician (1930–2025)

Professor Filemona F. Indire
- Born: 3 March 1930; Vihiga, Colony and Protectorate of Kenya
- Died: 13 March 2025 (aged 95); Nairobi, Kenya
- Occupations: Teacher, academic, politician, diplomat, farmer, mentor, Quaker Leader
- Spouse: Abigail Kageha (m. 1954)
- Children: 7

Academic background
- Education: Prince of Wales School (now Nairobi School)
- Alma mater: Makerere University, Ball State Teachers College

Academic work
- Notable works: Secondary Level Teachers: Supply and Demand in Kenya, Davy Koech Commission

Ambassador of Kenya to the Soviet Union
- In office 1960s

Nominated Member of Parliament, Ambassador
- In office 1983-1988

Filemona F. Indire (3 March 1930 – 13 March 2025) was a Kenyan politician who served as a nominated Member of the Parliament of Kenya between 1983 and 1988. He was also Kenya's ambassador to the Soviet Union in the 1960s, during Kenya's first president Jomo Kenyatta's tenure. After that, he served as a lecturer at the University of Nairobi.

Indire was also an influential Quaker, having served as Chairman of the Friend's World Committee for Consultation Africa Section, a Quaker organization that worked to communicate between all parts of Quakerism in the 1970s. He was also the Chairman of the National Council for Science and Technology in Nairobi, Kenya.

== Background ==
Indire was born in Vihiga, Colony and Protectorate of Kenya on 3 March 1930. He married Abigail Indire, one of the first of 10 African-Kenyan girls to attend high school in Kenya's history.

Filemona F. Indire died in Nairobi on 15 March 2025, at the age of 95.

== Works ==
Professor Indire wrote several books including A Comprehensive High School Curriculum Proposal for Reviewing and Revising the Program of Chavakali Secondary School, Maragoli, Kenya (1962) This study centred on the development of a curriculum which would assist in adequately meeting the needs of high-school students in Western Kenya. Another study that Indire wrote was a series of 15 books in collaboration with John W. Hanson, Secondary Level Teachers: Supply and Demand in Kenya.

The study, published in 1971, was a report on the supply of secondary-level teachers in Kenya. It focused on the problem of forecasting the likely demand for non-Kenyan personnel for staffing secondary-level institutions up to the year 1975, and it attempted to analyze the very real problem (at the time) of teacher supply within the context of the social and economic conditions of Kenya during the period leading up to the mid-1970s.

Other topics examined included the projected expansion of other types of secondary-level education, programmes for the preparation of teachers, major factors in teacher recruitment and retention, projected gaps in the teaching force, priorities in the provision and use of expatriate teachers, and recommendations of primary concern to Kenyan authorities of the day.

=== Davy Koech Commission Report ===
Indire was a member of the Commission of Inquiry into the Education System of Kenya commonly referred to as the Davy Koech Commission. The commission was established on 15 May 1998, by the president of Kenya at the time, Daniel Arap Moi.

== Bibliography ==
- Indire, Filemona F. (1962). A Comprehensive High School Curriculum Proposal for Reviewing and Revising the Program of Chavakali Secondary School, Maragoli, Kenya. Indiana University.
- Indire, Filemona F.; Hanson, John W. (1971). Secondary Level Teachers: Supply and Demand in Kenya. African Studies Center, Michigan State University.
- Indire, Filemona F. (1974). A history of the development of teacher education in Kenya. Faculty of Education, University of Nairobi.

== Sources ==
- http://erepository.uonbi.ac.ke/handle/11295/89063
- http://erepository.uonbi.ac.ke/handle/11295/89065
- http://erepository.uonbi.ac.ke/handle/11295/89061
- http://erepository.uonbi.ac.ke/handle/11295/89064
- http://oris.nacosti.go.ke/modules/library/publications/research_reports/NACOSTI-DL-RR-1039.pdf
- http://erepository.uonbi.ac.ke/handle/11295/8022/browse?value=Indire%2C+Filemona+F&type=author
