= Michael J. Saul =

American filmmaker

Michael J. Saul is an American filmmaker best known for his 2015 dramatic feature film The Surface.

== Career ==
In 2004, Saul wrote and directed his first anthology feature, True Love, followed by Crush in 2009. In 2015 Saul wrote and directed his first single-story feature The Surface starring Harry Hains and Michael Redford Carney. The feature had its world premiere at San Francisco's Frameline Film Festival in 2015 where it was well received by critics. The Surface also screened at the Austin Gay and Lesbian International Film Festival (aGLIFF) in 2015.

Between features and short films, Saul has directed short films, music videos, motion graphics and animation segments, including collaborations with Heath Daniels, Derek Dodge, and Tom Donahue. Since 2014, Saul has collaborated with James FT Hood and Moodswings, directing and animating the 360 immersive dome show Mesmerica, which premiered at the Fleet Science Center in San Diego, California on June 16, 2018.

Saul directed his first short documentary about poet Steven Reigns' art project The Gay Rub in 2018. It's titled The Gay Rub: A Documentary.

== Filmography ==
- Morning Dance (1989) (short) writer, director, editor
- Dominus (1992) (short) writer, director, editor
- Hover (1996) (short) writer, director, editor
- True Love (2004) (feature) writer, director, editor
- Don’t Read Now (2007) (short) writer, director, editor
- Crush (2009) (feature) writer, director, editor
- Go Go Reject (2010) (short) director, editor
- Nightcrawler (2011) (short) writer, director, editor
- My Life is a Diet (2011) (short) director, editor
- Adults Only (2013) (short) director, editor
- Euphoria (2014)(short) writer, director, editor
- The Best Man (2014) (short) director, editor
- The Surface (2015) (feature) writer, director, editor
- The Gay Rub: A Documentary (2018) (short) writer, director, editor
