= David J. Acer =

American dentist (1949–1990)

- Born: November 11, 1949; Cleveland, Ohio, U.S.
- Died: September 3, 1990 (aged 40); West Palm Beach, Florida, U.S.
- Cause of death: AIDS
- Education: Ohio State University College of Dentistry
- Occupation: Dentist
- Known for: Allegedly infecting patients with HIV

David J. Acer (November 11, 1949 – September 3, 1990) was an American dentist who allegedly infected six of his patients, including Kimberly Bergalis, with HIV. The Acer case is considered the first documented HIV transmission from a healthcare worker to a patient in the United States, though the means of transmission remain unknown. The high-profile case led to public controversy regarding HIV testing and disclosure for healthcare workers.

== Early life ==
David Johnson Acer was born on November 11, 1949, in Cleveland, Ohio, and he was raised in North Canton. He was the first of four children of Victor and Harriet Acer. He graduated from Hoover High School in 1967, where he participated in wrestling, the German Club, and the school's yearbook staff.

After graduation, Acer enrolled at Ohio State University, then enrolled in the university's dental school in 1970. Students and professors regarded Acer as a shy but solid individual who rarely missed a class and seldom partook in party antics on campus. He graduated from dental school in March 1974 and was licensed to practice in Ohio for four years, until 1977. Acer then joined the U.S. Air Force, where he held the rank of captain and practiced dentistry while stationed in Germany.

== Career ==
Acer moved to Jensen, Florida and opened his own dental practice in nearby Stuart in 1981. Many of his patients were referred by CIGNA Dental Health of Florida. The carrier covered hundreds of state employees and Martin County schoolteachers.

Acer settled in Stuart, which was a twenty-minute commute to his practice. He maintained a brick and stucco ranch home on Alamanda Way, where he kept a pet cocker spaniel and a 20-foot fishing boat. He was described by friends and colleagues as professional, but not very social in large group settings.

When not at the office, Acer enjoyed fishing, tennis, and golf. He was often seen playing tennis at Falkenburg Tennis Club, two days a week.

In 1985, Acer added an associate dentist, Elizabeth Greenhill. Greenhill told the Palm Beach Post that she had wanted him to autoclave his dental instruments, though he did routinely steam clean them. She told the paper that Acer did not make any extra effort towards the enforcement of universal precautions, despite CIGNA'S procedural manual for dentists covering this very subject, which included the use of masks and gloves while treating patients. Acer used neither, but this was overlooked by CIGNA's dental director, who regularly visited Acer's practice.

== AIDS diagnosis ==
Acer believed he had contracted HIV in 1986 through sexual contact, but did not exhibit any symptoms of AIDS. Meanwhile, his practice continued to grow, with him seeing close to 2,000 patients in 1987, clearing about $50,000 that year. That was also the year that Acer began to show visible symptoms of AIDS.

Acer saw Frank Gutierrez, his general practitioner, in September 1987 for treatment of a sore throat. Gutierrez, who knew of Acer's lifestyle habits, warned him to practice safe sex. Acer then saw an oral surgeon who took a biopsy of the roof of his mouth. Rolf Wolfrom diagnosed Acer as having Kaposi's sarcoma, a form of AIDS-related cancer. Acer, realizing that he was dying, confessed that he had likely had 150 different sexual partners in the past decade, and had not used a condom during his last sexual experience two months prior. He began taking AZT and getting treatment at the VA Medical Center for the oral lesions. When he returned to Gutierrez in November, Acer informed him that he was practicing safe sex only.

In December 1987, Acer treated Kimberly Bergalis for two abscessed molars, and continued to see other patients well into 1988. With symptoms advancing, his work began to get sloppy, prompting other patients to take notice that he was reusing gloves and other disposable components, not sterilizing instruments, and taking shortcuts that put patients' safety in jeopardy. Acer also began showing lesions on his skin, prompting him to wear long sleeves and buttoned collars, regardless of the weather.

By early 1989, Acer's symptoms had worsened, with frequent coughing, blurred vision and more lesions appearing on his skin. By summer, he had missed so much work that he could no longer keep it a secret and told his family of his illness after being hospitalized with pneumonia. Those who inquired about his health were told he had terminal cancer. He then put his practice up for sale, later selling it to Ben Emerson, who kept 20 of Acer's patients and the reception room furniture. Almost everything else was thrown out.

In March 1990, Kim Bergalis was diagnosed with AIDS. Officials from the CDC office in Atlanta investigated Acer after learning of Bergalis' medical history. Acer, by this time, was housebound and receiving care from his parents, who had relocated from Pennsylvania to Florida. He told the CDC that since learning he had AIDS, he wore gloves and masks when treating patients. The CDC concluded on July 27, 1990, that based on epidemiologic and laboratory findings, it was possible that Acer transmitted the HIV virus from himself to Bergalis. Three days before his death, Acer ran an open letter in several newspapers that he had AIDS.

== Death ==
Acer was taken from his home on August 31, 1990, to live his final days at Hospice of Palm Beach County at West Palm Beach. Acer was suffering from hallucinations, a severe cough, and lesions in his mouth, and on his skin and lungs. His weight had dropped to 115 pounds from 175. On September 3, 1990, Acer died of complications arising from Kaposi's sarcoma. He was later cremated at Tri-County Crematory in Stuart. There was no memorial service.

== Aftermath ==
Four days after Acer had died, Kimberly Bergalis' family sued his estate for malpractice, and Kimberly decided to go public with her story. The Acer controversy started a great debate in the country regarding whether healthcare workers were obligated to disclose their HIV status to patients. Bergalis and her family fought in support of laws mandating all healthcare workers be screened for HIV and to tell patients if they are positive. In response to public outcry, the AMA and ADA urged HIV-positive practitioners to disclose their status to patients or to stop performing surgeries. Healthcare workers and LGBTQ activists argued that mandating testing would be a breach of privacy and reduce public trust for healthcare providers.

The CDC had closed and published its investigation in July 1990 without further verification or follow-up, but litigation against Acer's malpractice insurance continued through the 1990s. Depositions, private investigator reports, and medical records were leaked to journalist Stephen Barr writing for Lear's magazine. The court documents revealed that the genetic test used by the CDC was an early test that was unverified. Dr. John Witte, Florida's top AIDS official, called the evidence of transmission "scientifically inconclusive."

Investigators also discovered Kimberly Bergalis had lied to CDC investigators about her sexual history and other possible risk exposures, and another patient allegedly infected by Acer was discovered to have had intercourse with a prostitute who later died of AIDS. Medical records showed a third patient the CDC claimed Acer had seen often and for extensive procedures had only visited Acer's office once for a cleaning by a hygenicist - a treatment making exposure to HIV highly unlikely and deliberate infection impossible. The hygenicist also testified claims of shoddy sanitary practices were not true. The chief of Retrovirology at Mt. Sinai Medical Center in Miami also discovered five cases of HIV with similar genetic strains to Acer that had no link to Acer or his patients, testifying "it is as likely the patients got HIV from the community." Finally, Bergalis developed AIDS two years after her treatment by Acer, but only 1 percent of patients go from infection to illness that quickly.

In context, the Ryan White CARE Act was being debated in Congress, but it was met with opposition because HIV infection was perceived to be caused by stigmatizing risk factors such as homosexuality, substance use, and sexual promiscuity. The media hype around Acer seemed motivated to create "innocent" as opposed to "deserving" victims. Testifying to Congress, Bergalis claimed "I did nothing wrong" and legislators were moved by the story of a white self-proclaimed virgin victimized by a reckless gay man. The case of the "Florida Dracula Dentist" has gone down in AIDS history alongside "Patient Zero" Gaetan Dugas as legends who have been demonized.

In 2021, poet Steven Reigns published "A Quilt for David", based on years of his own research into the Acer case. Reigns' research papers are now held at ONE National Gay & Lesbian Archives at the University of Southern California Libraries.
