= To Touch the Soul =

- Theatrical release poster
- Directed by: Ryan Goble
- Screenplay by: Ryan Goble; Erin Henning
- Story by: Teresa Hagen
- Produced by: Teresa Hagen; Co-producers: Ryan Goble; Erin Henning
- Starring: Carlos Silveira
- Narrated by: Cassandra Hepburn
- Cinematography: Erin Henning
- Edited by: Ryan Goble
- Music by: Martin Herman
- Distributed by: Cut Loose Productions
- Release date: October 11, 2007 (La Femme Film Festival)
- Running time: 70 minutes
- Country: United States
- Language: English

To Touch the Soul is a 2007 documentary film directed by Ryan Goble and produced by Teresa Hagen. The film was written by Goble and Erin Henning, from a story by Hagen. The documentary is narrated by Cassandra Hepburn.

== Synopsis ==
To Touch the Soul follows California State University, Long Beach Professor Carlos Silveira, a Brazilian-born artist educator and social activist, who recruits 27 American university students to join him in a pilot program that uses art to help impoverished Cambodian children affected by HIV/AIDS express their wishes and desires for their futures. As Carlos and the students grapple with the realities of a culture much different from their own, a language they don't understand, art projects that don't go as planned and a three-week deadline, they form a bond with the children. Through these young Cambodian mentors—all of them abandoned by society—the Americans empower their own social activism and learn the true meaning of kindness, selflessness, courage and community.

== Interviews ==
- Carlos Silveira
- Saneya Bair
- Heather Hamilton
- John Lachey
- Amanda Mithers
- Saveun Nhim
- Casey Quirarte
- John Tucker
- Sundy Ven
- Cassandra Hepburn (Narrator)

== Background ==
The story is told from Carlos’ and six of his students’ perspectives through a mix of spoken (voice-over) diary entries, interviews and interaction with the children as they create art projects together, and shows that even the smallest attempt at making a difference can have life-changing consequences for all the people involved. The film also highlights the growing problem of the 77,000 children in Cambodia who have become orphans due to their parents dying from AIDS, a population expected to grow to 108,700 over the next five years.

=== Filming locations ===
Filming locations include: Long Beach, California and Phnom Penh, Cambodia.

== Film festivals ==
- La Femme Film Festival, Beverly Hills, California
- Wild Rose Independent Film Festival, Ames, Iowa
- Myrtle Beach International Film Festival, Myrtle Beach, South Carolina
- Conscious Life Film Festival, Los Angeles, California
- Byron Bay Film Festival, Byron Bay, New South Wales, Australia
- Memphis International Film Festival, Memphis, Tennessee
- Newport Beach Film Festival, Newport Beach, California
- Global Arts Film Festival, Los Angeles, California
- San Joaquin Film Festival, Stockton, California
- Action on Film International Film Festival, Pasadena, California
- Southern Winds Film Festival, Shawnee, Oklahoma

== Awards ==
Wins

- Accolade Competition: Best of Show, Videography, 2007; Honorable Mention, Motivational/Inspirational Category, 2007.
- Wild Rose Independent Film Festival: Best Documentary Film, 2007; Certificate of Distinctive Achievement - Director of a Feature Film (Ryan Goble), 2007; Debut Film Certificate of Distinctive Achievement, 2007.
- Myrtle Beach International Film Festival: Honorable Mention, 2007.
- Byron Bay (Australia) Film Festival: Honorable Mention, 2008.
- San Joaquin Film Festival: Best Documentary, 2008.
- Southern Winds Film Festival: Best Feature Documentary, 2009.
