= Dolzura Cortez =

Filipina AIDS activist

Ma. Dolzura Cortez
- Born: Maria Dolzura Cortez; 1960 or 1961; Mindanao, Philippines
- Died: 1992; Manila, Philippines
- Cause of death: AIDS
- Known for: First Filipino with AIDS to open publicly

Ma. Dolzura Cortez (1960 or 1961 – 1992) was a Filipino who died of AIDS complications. She was the first Filipino with AIDS to publicly discuss her life and her experience living with HIV/AIDS. Cortez responded to a newspaper ad looking for a person living with HIV/AIDS who was willing to have their life serialized in print and later developed into a movie.

Her life story was made into the 1993 Filipino film Dahil Mahal na Mahal Kita (English "Because I Love You: The Dolzura Cortez Story"), directed by Laurice Guillen, screenplay by Ricardo Lee, starring Vilma Santos, Christopher de Leon, Charito Solis, Maila Gumila, Mikee Villanueva, and Jackie Aquino.

== Profile ==
Born somewhere in Mindanao, Cortez, through a publicized newspaper story, revealed that at age 14, she first went into a relationship with an army corporal—a married man—"twice her age"; they had three children. She then migrated to Angeles City, Pampanga, where their relationship became complicated.

She later worked at decent jobs, and with the help of an Australian businessman, she continued pursuing her education and started a business through a bar in Ermita, Manila. While managing a bar, she gave birth to two more children, each with a foreign contact—a Qatari and a Bahraini—one of whom is believed to have infected her with HIV.

Her failure to seek refuge in her home town later forced her to live her remaining days in San Lazaro Hospital in Manila. There Cortez, responding to a request by journalist Ceres Doyo of the Philippine Daily Inquirer, made her story public, becoming the first person with AIDS to openly admit suffering from the disease.

Cortez died in the hospital on October 12, 1992, at age 31. According to the Department of Health she was the 50th person in the country to die of the disease.

=== Impact ===
Her story was published in the newspaper from August 31 to September 3, 1992. Prior to Cortez, there had been interviews with anonymous Filipinos afflicted with AIDS; yet Cortez even allowed the publication of her picture to inform the public on the effect of the disease.

The story, drawing significant response from the public, helped raise awareness of the disease. It was later developed into the 1993 movie, the first to document such experiences.

Sarah Jane Salazar was the second to publicize her diagnosis in 1994 through a press conference by the DOH, whose story likewise became another film, Secrets of Sarah Jane.

More than a year after Cortez's death, the Catholic Church, through a pastoral letter in response to rising AIDS cases, said that the impact of the disease remains unknown to the public due to lack of a monitoring system. They also warned that the government's condom solution is a short-term, which only brings disastrous effects and encourages promiscuity.

Nevertheless, the number of HIV cases rose since the DOH declared AIDS a notifiable disease in 1986. Between 2010 and 2018, it increased by 203%, the highest in the Asia–Pacific. By mid-2020, the country had reported more than 70,000.

== Biographical film ==
OctoArts Films bought the rights for her biographical film, a romance drama which later titled Dahil Mahal Kita (The Dolzura Cortez Story). Vilma Santos, as Cortez wanted in one of the latter's conversations, portrayed the title role. The film's theme song, revived from the eponymous single by the Boyfriends, was recorded by Ogie Alcasid.

The movie was released as an entry of the 1993 Manila Film Festival, which began on June 25.

The film was screened in the Singapore International Film Festival in 2004.

Dahil Mahal Kita (The Dolzura Cortez Story)
Cast (main)	Vilma Santos; Christopher de Leon; Charito Solis
Director	Laurice Guillen
Writer	Ricky Lee
Cinematographer	Totoy Jacinto
Film editor	Ike Jarlego
Musical scorer	Nonong Buencamino

=== Overview ===
The film mainly focuses on Cortez's love story since her teenage years, and recounts how she publicly appeared for the first time and raised consciousness about HIV/AIDS, with its intent to challenge the idea of distinguishing right and wrong.

According to Guillen, the film mainly aimed to make teenagers aware of and have understanding of the disease.

=== Accolades ===
In 1994, the film won awards in the 12th Annual Academy Awards of the Film Academy of the Philippines, and in the annual Gawad Urian Awards.

Year	Award-giving body	Category	Recipient	Result	Ref.
1994	Gawad Urian Awards	Best Actress	Vilma Santos	Won	
1994	12th Annual Academy Awards	Best Actress	Vilma Santos	Won	
1994	12th Annual Academy Awards	Best Picture	Dolzura Cortez Story	Nominated	
1994	12th Annual Academy Awards	Best Director	Laurice Guillen	Nominated	
1994	12th Annual Academy Awards	Best Supporting Actress	Charito Solis	Nominated	
1994	12th Annual Academy Awards	Best Musical Score	Nonong Buencamino	Won	
1994	12th Annual Academy Awards	Best Scriptwriter	Ricardo Lee	Won	
