= Kimberly Bergalis =

American AIDS victim

- Born: Kimberly Ann Bergalis; January 19, 1968; Tamaqua, Pennsylvania, U.S.
- Died: December 8, 1991 (aged 23); Fort Pierce, Florida, U.S.
- Cause of death: AIDS-related complications
- Resting place: Saints Peter and Paul RC Lithuanian Cemetery
- Education: University of Florida
- Known for: First known case of clinically-transmitted HIV

Kimberly Ann Bergalis (January 19, 1968 – December 8, 1991) was an American woman who was one of six patients purportedly infected with HIV by dentist David J. Acer, who was infected with HIV and died of AIDS on September 3, 1990.

== Background ==
The eldest of three daughters, Bergalis was born in Tamaqua, Pennsylvania, in 1968, where her family lived until moving to Florida in 1978. In 1985, she enrolled at the University of Florida and majored in business. A devout Catholic, Bergalis always maintained that she was a virgin and that she never used intravenous drugs.

In December 1987, dentist Dr. David Acer removed two of Bergalis's molars. Acer was HIV-positive at the time, having been diagnosed that fall. In March 1989, Bergalis began to display symptoms of AIDS and was diagnosed with the disease in January 1990. The initial report from the Centers for Disease Control and Prevention (CDC) stated that she had likely acquired her infection from her dentist, which prompted Acer to write an open letter requesting that his patients be tested for HIV infection. The Florida Department of Health and Rehabilitative Services tested over 1,000 patients, discovering two additional HIV-positive patients. The CDC would eventually identify a total of ten HIV-positive patients and subsequently retraced six of the infections to Acer.

== CDC investigation ==
The CDC conducted a phylogenetic analysis of the DNA sequences of the viral envelope gene. The analysis revealed that the viral sequences from five patients, including Bergalis, were more closely related to the dentist's viral sequences than to those from local controls. Later analyses identified another HIV-positive patient with a viral sequence closely related to Acer's. Independent review of the CDC tests strengthened the case that Bergalis' HIV infection was linked to Acer.

The CDC had closed and published its investigation in July 1990 without further verification or follow-up, but litigation against Acer's malpractice insurance continued through the 1990s. Depositions, private investigator reports, and medical records were leaked to journalist Stephen Barr writing for Lear's magazine. The court documents revealed that the genetic test used by the CDC was an early test that was unverified. Dr. John Witte, Florida's top AIDS official, called the evidence of transmission "scientifically inconclusive." Investigators also discovered Bergalis had lied to CDC investigators about her sexual history and other possible risk exposures, and another patient allegedly infected by Acer was discovered to have had intercourse with a sex worker who later died of AIDS. Medical records showed a third patient the CDC claimed Acer had seen often and for extensive procedures had only visited Acer's office once for a cleaning by a hygenicist — a treatment making exposure to HIV highly unlikely and deliberate infection impossible. The hygenicist also testified claims of shoddy sanitary practices were not true. The chief of Retrovirology at Mt. Sinai Medical Center in Miami also discovered five cases of HIV with similar genetic strains to Acer that had no link to Acer or his patients, testifying "it is as likely the patients got HIV from the community." Finally, Bergalis developed AIDS two years after her treatment by Acer, but only 1% of patients go from infection to illness that quickly.

In context, the Ryan White CARE Act was being debated in Congress, but it was met with opposition because HIV infection was perceived to be caused by stigmatized risk factors such as homosexuality, substance use, and sexual promiscuity. The media hype around Acer seemed motivated to create "innocent" as opposed to "deserving" victims. Testifying to Congress, Bergalis claimed "I did nothing wrong" and legislators were moved by the story of a white self-proclaimed virgin victimized by a reckless gay man. The case of the "Florida Dracula Dentist" has gone down in AIDS history alongside "Patient Zero" Gaetan Dugas as legends who have been unfairly demonized.

The time between Bergalis' dental procedure and the development of AIDS (24 months) was short; 1% of infected homosexual/bisexual men and 5% of infected transfusion recipients develop AIDS within two years of infection.

== Political reaction ==
During the last months of her life, Bergalis' case was cited by some politicians and journalists as an example of a 'blameless' HIV infection that had been allowed to happen due to the CDC and the healthcare industry being overly responsive to the concerns of AIDS activists and the gay community. In an obituary, the National Review wrote that Bergalis:

came to feel she had a special calling...to bring a glimmer of truth, however forlorn, into a debate characterized by confusion, denial, smugness, and suicidal self-indulgence... 'No sexual history' is how the jaded describe a chaste woman of 23 who, as Miss Bergalis explained to disbelieving interviewers, 'wanted to wait for marriage.' Marriage and its joys will never come for Kimberly Bergalis, but in her integrity and courage she affirmed that other things were also precious. Bergalis actively participated in several actions by congressmen to pass legislation restricting the activities of persons infected with HIV. Shortly before Bergalis's 1991 death, despite failing health, she testified before the Congress in support of a bill sponsored by Representative William Dannemeyer mandating HIV tests for healthcare workers, and permitting doctors to test patients without their consent.

== Death and posthumous controversy ==
On December 8, 1991, Bergalis died of AIDS-related complications at her home in Fort Pierce, Florida. Her funeral was held on December 12 in her hometown of Tamaqua, Pennsylvania, after which she was buried in Saints Peter and Paul RC Lithuanian Cemetery. Shortly after Bergalis’ death, a small park on Hutchinson Island South, Florida, was renamed Kimberly Bergalis Memorial Park in her memory.

Nearly three years after Bergalis’ death, in June 1994, CBS aired an episode of 60 Minutes that included a segment covering Acer and the patients he allegedly infected. The episode alleged that Bergalis, who said she was a virgin, had been treated for genital warts, a sexually transmitted disease, and showed her on videotape allegedly claiming to have had sex with two different men during her life. However, none of Bergalis' former serious boyfriends tested positive for HIV. In addition, the 60 Minutes anchors argued that the CDC may have botched the genetic tests that proved that Bergalis had the same strain of HIV as her dentist. The television broadcast was dismissed by CDC scientists as misleading and inaccurate. Stephen Barr, a journalist who contributed to the show, rebutted this dismissal.

In 1990, Congressman Ted Weiss, who was skeptical of the CDC's conclusions, requested a formal investigation by the Government Accounting Office (GAO, in 2004 renamed General Accountability Office), an independent auditing, evaluation, and investigative body responsible to Congress. A GAO technical team reviewed the CDC's actions and studied its evidence and conclusions. Their report fully supported the CDC report and refuted the claims of Barr and other skeptics, point by point. The principal investigator of the GAO team, Mark Rom, Ph.D., later published an analysis of the case. Neither the CDC nor the GAO was able to solve the mystery of just how Bergalis acquired the HIV virus from Acer, but neither agency doubts that this did happen somehow.
