= Davy Koech Commission =

The Commission of Inquiry into the Education System of Kenya commonly referred to as the Davy Koech Commission was a Kenya Government Commission established on 15 May 1998 by the then President Daniel arap Moi. The commission was led by Dr. Davy Kiprotich Koech and was to investigate the question of the appropriateness of Kenya’s 8-4-4 education system

== Membership ==
The Commission's membership included:

- Prof. Davy Kiprotich Koech - Chairperson
- Prof. Florida A. Karani Vice-Chairperson
- Dr. (Prof.) Joseph Maina Mungai (Joint Secretary)
- Prof. David K. Some (Joint Secretary)
- Johnson M. Hungu (Joint Secretary)
- Hastings W.O. Okoth-Ogendo
- Eddah W. Gachukia
- Filemona F. Indire
- Jack G. Okech
- Joseph D. Kimura
- Abdulghafur H.S. El-Busaidy
- Abdisalam S. Mohamed
- Ambrose A. Adongo
- George K. King’oriah
- Mwakai K. Sio
- Nicodemus Kirima
- Emmanuel S. Rumpe
- Joel J. Ngatiari
- Jackson Kang’ali
- Michael M. Ndurumo
- Nathaniel K. Chepkener
- Noah C. Chune
- Peter M. Kavisi
- Joan A. Okudo
- Swafiya M. Said

== Report ==
The commission completed its work in August 1999 and handed its report to the President in October 1999. Some of the recommendations include:

1. Replacement of 8-4-4 system with TIQET
2. Expansion of compulsory basic education from 8 years to 12 years
3. No examination between primary and secondary
4. Reduction of subjects at secondary to ease curriculum
5. Introduced a pre-university level to allow students to mature before going to university
