= Sarah Jane Salazar =

Filipino activist (1975–2000)

- Born: Marissa Reynon c. 1975; Cotabato, Philippines
- Died: June 11, 2000 (aged 24–25); Manila, Philippines

Sarah Jane Salazar, born Marissa Reynon (1975 – June 11, 2000), was a Filipino AIDS activist and educator and the second Filipino to go public with HIV at age 19 in 1994. The first was Dolzura Cortez.

== Biography ==
She contracted HIV from a foreign customer while working as a club entertainer in the early 1990s.

Her life story was made into a movie entitled The Secrets of Sarah Jane (Sana'y Mapatawad Mo) in 1994 starring Gelli de Belen, who won a best actress award for the role at the 1995 Gawad Urian Awards.

== Controversies ==
In 1997, at 21 and already an HIV educator, Salazar was charged with child abuse for having sex with 16-year-old Ritchie Atizado. She then became pregnant and gave birth to a son. Atizado said that they were lovers. He later tested positive for HIV.

== Death ==
Salazar died on June 11, 2000, at the age of 25 from AIDS complications. Before her death, Salazar was confined at the National Center for Mental Health after being diagnosed with manic depression which doctors said may have been related to anti-AIDS drugs she was taking. Her two children tested negative for HIV.
