= Noriyasu Akase =

Japanese AIDS activist

Noriyasu Akase (赤瀬 範保, Akase Noriyasu; died June 17, 1991) was a Japanese AIDS activist who was the first person in Japan to publicly admit to being HIV positive. For this reason, he was the subject of media scrutiny until his death, and he and his family faced discrimination because of his condition.

== Announcement ==
In 1988, Akase appeared in an interview televised by NHK. In it he said, "I’ll just be pleased if you show me as an ordinary old man with hemophilia, an old timer who contracted HIV and is having fun despite his disability. I'd like my friends to have courage and spend their time in a meaningful way. It's okay to worry and it's okay to think about all sorts of things, but time marches on, no matter how much you worry."

== Consequences ==
Akase's wife was fired from her nursing job after her employer discovered that her husband had HIV. She was subsequently fired six more times from new employers for the same reason.

== Legacy ==
Akase died of a cranial hemorrhage on June 17, 1991. His name is cited on Block 12 of the AIDS Quilt memorial in New Zealand.
