= Kenya Medical Research Institute =

Kenyan state corporation for health research

The Kenya Medical Research Institute (KEMRI) is a state corporation established through the Science and Technology (Amendment) Act of 1979, (since amended to the Sciences, Technology and Innovation Act 2013), during the tenure of Nicholas Biwott as Minister of State, as the national body responsible for carrying out health research in Kenya.

KEMRI is the medical research arm of the Kenya Government providing advice on various aspects of healthcare and delivery, including national diseases surveillance and rapid response capacity for major disease outbreaks including HIV, cholera, Chikungunya virus, H1N1 flu, yellow fever, Rift Valley fever, Ebola, aflatoxicosis and COVID-19.

KEMRI is mandated to carry out research in human health; to cooperate with other research organizations and institutions of higher learning on matters of relevant research and training; to work with other research bodies within and outside Kenya carrying out similar research; to cooperate with the Ministry of Public Health and Sanitation, the Ministry of Medical Services, the National Council of Science and Technology (NSCT) and the Medical Science Advisory Research Committee in matters pertaining to research policies and priorities.

KEMRI has grown over the last 40 years to become a regional leader in human health research. The institute currently ranks as one of the leading centres of excellence in health research both in Africa and globally. During a state visit to the United States in May 2024, where he was hosted by President Joe Biden, President William Ruto highlighted KEMRI as having a positive impact of effective partnership between Kenya and US organisations.

President Ruto hailed the partnerships between CDC (Centres for Disease Control and Prevention), the US National Institute of Health and KEMRI as an initiative that had led to significant scientific discoveries, notably the malaria vaccine and called for increased grants to Kemri tol help establish strong intellectual property and scientific entrepreneurship frameworks. This he said, would support Kenya's focus on product development, a key component of the country's pharmaceutical and biomedical manufacturing sector, aligned with BETA priorities.

== Locations ==
KEMRI Research includes the following centers:

1. Centre for Biotechnology Research and Development (CBRD):Mandate is to develop biotechnological innovations such as diagnostic kits, vaccines and associated delivery technology
2. Centre for Clinical Research (CCR)
3. Centre for Geographic Medicine Research-Coast (CGMR-C)
4. Centre for Global Health Research (CGHR)
5. Centre for Infectious and Parasitic Diseases Control Research (CIPDCR)
6. Centre for Microbiology Research (CMR)
7. Centre for Public Health Research (CPHR)
8. Centre for Respiratory Diseases Research (CRDR)
9. Centre for Traditional Medicine and Drug Research (CTMDR)
10. Centre for Virus Research (CVR)
11. The Eastern and Southern Africa Centre of International Parasite Control (ESACIPAC)
12. KEMRI Graduate School of Health Sciences
13. Health Safety and Environment
14. Production Centre

== Partners ==
KEMRI has links with a number of international, regional and local partners.

=== International partners ===
- The Wellcome (Trust), a global charitable foundation dedicated to improving health and research.
- The US Centre for Disease Control and Prevention (CDC).
- The Japan International Cooperation Agency (JICA).
- The United States Army Medical Research Directorate – Kenya.
- The World Health Organization.
- The US Agency for International Development (USAID).
- The British Medical Research Council.
- KIT Royal Tropical Institute (Amsterdam).
- The World Association of Industrial and Technological Research Organization (WAITRO).

=== Regional partners ===
- Ghana National Institute of Medical Research.
- Ethiopia Health and Nutrition Research Institute.
- Ethiopia Virus Research Institute.
- Makerere University Medical School.
- University of Zambia Medical School.

=== Local partnerships ===
- Jomo Kenyatta University of Agriculture and Technology.
- University of Nairobi.
- Maseno University.
